= 1990–91 Red Star Belgrade season =

Red Star Belgrade
1990–91 season
- Chairman: Svetozar Mijailović
- Manager: Ljupko Petrović
- Yugoslav First League: 1st
- Yugoslav Cup: Runners-up
- European Cup: Winners
- Top goalscorer: League: Darko Pančev (34); All: Darko Pančev (45)

1990–91 Red Star Belgrade season was the 45th edition of the Red Star Belgrade in the 1990–91 Yugoslav First League, 1990–91 Yugoslav Cup and 1990–91 European Cup.

== Pre-season and friendlies ==
21 July 1990	Torquay United (England)	1–2	(Socialist Federal Republic of Yugoslavia) Red Star Belgrade	Plainmoor, Torquay

24 July 1990	Hinckley Town (England)	1–9	(Socialist Federal Republic of Yugoslavia) Red Star Belgrade	Leicester Road, Hinckley

26 July 1990	Crewe Alexandra (England)	0–4	(Socialist Federal Republic of Yugoslavia) Red Star Belgrade	Gresty Road, Crewe

28 July 1990	Merthyr Tydfil (Wales)	1–1	(Socialist Federal Republic of Yugoslavia) Red Star Belgrade	Penydarren Park, Merthyr Tydfil

30 July 1990	Scarborough (England)	2–4	(Socialist Federal Republic of Yugoslavia) Red Star Belgrade	McCain Stadium, Scarborough

31 July 1990	Bradford City (England)	2–1	(Socialist Federal Republic of Yugoslavia) Red Star Belgrade	Valley Parade, Bradford

=== Trofeo Villa de Madrid ===
28 August 1990	Atlético Madrid (Spain)	3–2	(Socialist Federal Republic of Yugoslavia) Red Star Belgrade	Vicente Calderón Stadium, Madrid
	Rodax 20', 33', 61'		Pančev 17'; Savićević 21'	Attendance: 35,000

== Squad ==
Name	Yugoslav First League		Yugoslav Cup		European Cup		Total	
Name	Apps	Goals	Apps	Goals	Apps	Goals	Apps	Goals
Goalkeepers
(Socialist Federal Republic of Yugoslavia) Stevan Stojanović	33	0	8	0	9	0	50	0
(Socialist Federal Republic of Yugoslavia) Milić Jovanović	3	0	0	0	0	0	3	0
(Socialist Federal Republic of Yugoslavia) Željko Kaluđerović	0	0	0	0	1	0	1	0
Defenders
(Romania) Miodrag Belodedici	34	1	8	0	9	0	51	1
(Socialist Federal Republic of Yugoslavia) Duško Radinović	30	0	7	0	8	1	45	1
(Socialist Federal Republic of Yugoslavia) Ilija Najdoski	32	2	6	1	6	0	44	3
(Socialist Federal Republic of Yugoslavia) Slobodan Marović	27	1	8	0	9	0	44	1
(Socialist Federal Republic of Yugoslavia) Refik Šabanadžović	26	0	5	0	8	0	39	0
(Socialist Federal Republic of Yugoslavia) Rade Tošić	11	0	0	0	1	0	12	0
(Socialist Federal Republic of Yugoslavia) Goran Vasilijević	7	0	3	0	2	0	12	0
(Socialist Federal Republic of Yugoslavia) Aleksandar Ilić	1	0	0	0	0	0	1	0
Midfielders
(Socialist Federal Republic of Yugoslavia) Vlada Stošić	35	4	7	0	9	0	51	4
(Socialist Federal Republic of Yugoslavia) Vladimir Jugović	32	7	8	0	9	0	49	7
(Socialist Federal Republic of Yugoslavia) Robert Prosinečki	29	11	6	2	9	4	44	17
(Socialist Federal Republic of Yugoslavia) Dejan Savićević	25	8	7	3	7	3	39	14
(Socialist Federal Republic of Yugoslavia) Siniša Mihajlović	14	1	3	1	5	1	22	3
(Socialist Federal Republic of Yugoslavia) Ivica Momčilović	13	0	1	0	1	0	15	0
(Socialist Federal Republic of Yugoslavia) Dejan Joksimović	5	0	1	0	0	0	6	0
(Socialist Federal Republic of Yugoslavia) Ivan Adžić	4	1	0	0	0	0	4	1
(Socialist Federal Republic of Yugoslavia) Duško Savić	2	0	0	0	0	0	2	0
(Socialist Federal Republic of Yugoslavia) Đorđe Aćimović	1	0	0	0	0	0	1	0
Forwards
(Socialist Federal Republic of Yugoslavia) Darko Pančev	32	34	7	6	9	5	48	45
(Socialist Federal Republic of Yugoslavia) Dragiša Binić	27	13	6	4	9	2	42	19
(Socialist Federal Republic of Yugoslavia) Ljubiša Milojević	8	1	0	0	0	0	8	1
(Socialist Federal Republic of Yugoslavia) Vladan Lukić	4	1	0	0	0	0	4	1
Players sold or loaned out during the season
(Socialist Federal Republic of Yugoslavia) Mitar Mrkela	1	0	2	1	0	0	3	1
(Socialist Federal Republic of Yugoslavia) Goran Jurić	8	0	4	0	1	0	13	0
(Socialist Federal Republic of Yugoslavia) Enes Bešić	3	0	1	0	0	0	4	0
(Socialist Federal Republic of Yugoslavia) Slaviša Čula	2	0	2	0	0	0	4	0
(Socialist Federal Republic of Yugoslavia) Milorad Ratković	1	0	1	0	0	0	2	0

== The 1991 European Cup Winner Generation ==
Coach:

- (Socialist Federal Republic of Yugoslavia) Ljupko Petrović, born in Brusnica Velika, SR Bosnia and Herzegovina, spent his career in Yugoslavia playing with Osijek in the 1970s, and afterwards, in the United States playing indoor soccer during the early 1980s. In 1982, he returned to Yugoslavia and started his coaching career at Osijek youth levels. In 1984, he became assistant manager at Spanish side Espanyol and not long afterwards returned to Osijek, this time to be head coach of the main team. Later, he spent one season with Spartak Subotica before taking charge of Yugoslavia national team youth levels during 1987 and 1988. Next, he replaced Ivica Brzić in Vojvodina in 1988 and achieved an exceptional result by winning the Yugoslav championship in 1989, a title they were chasing for 33 years. It became clear that in between much stronger clubs, Vojvodina won due in large of the exceptional skills of Petrović as coach. This success made him become desired by Red Star directive board, who brought him shortly after along with their star player, Siniša Mihajlović. After winning the European Cup with Red Star, Petrović notability expanded abroad and, as result, in the following decades he coached clubs in Spain, Uruguay, Greece, UAE, Austria, Croatia, China, Kazakhstan, Rwanda, Bulgaria, Vietnam, and the list is still expanding.

Goalkeepers:

- (Socialist Federal Republic of Yugoslavia) Stevan Stojanović (Captain), born in Kosovska Mitrovica, SR Serbia, was the main Red Star goalkeeper for almost a decade. He later played with Royal Antwerp in Belgium. He was Yugoslav U-21 and Olympic international. He was the captain of the team and after retiring became players agent. During the period Dragan Stojković was Red Star president, he returned to the club as sporting director.
- (Socialist Federal Republic of Yugoslavia) Željko Kaluđerović, born in Bar, SR Montenegro, came to Red Star from Mornar. He later played with Djurgården in Sweden.
- (Socialist Federal Republic of Yugoslavia) Milić Jovanović, born in Belgrade, SR Serbia, came to Red Star from Napredak, and later played in Portugal.

Defenders:

- (Socialist Federal Republic of Yugoslavia) Duško Radinović, born in SR Montenegro, played with OFK Titograd and Sutjeska before joining Red Star. Afterwards, he played in Sweden. He got injured day before the final and missed the game because of it, but his contribution in the campaign was significant. After retiring, "Radin" continued living in Sweden, where he became a high school teacher and kept his links with football by being the assistant manager of Malmö City FC.
- (Socialist Federal Republic of Yugoslavia) Slobodan Marović, born in Bar, SR Montenegro, played with Osijek before joining Red Star. Afterwards, he continued his career in Sweden, Denmark and China. He was a Yugoslav international. After retiring, he dedicated to tourism, renting apartments in his hometown, Bar. Later, between 2010 and 2012, he was assistant manager at Red Star while Prosinečki was the coach.
- (Socialist Federal Republic of Yugoslavia) Refik Šabanadžović, born in Tuzi, SR Montenegro, a Montenegrin Bosniak, he played with Željezničar Sarajevo where he became one of their most notable players during the mid-1980s and a Yugoslavia national team player. He came to Red Star in 1987 and played four seasons in Belgrade. Later, he moved to Greece where he played seven seasons in the very top of Greek football with AEK Athens and Olympiacos. He finished his career in the United States. He was a member of the Yugoslav 1988 Olympic squad and played in the 1990 FIFA World Cup. Nowadays, he lives between Podgorica and Sarajevo where he owns two cafes, Studio 5 and Studio 4 respectively.
- Miodrag Belodedici, born in Socol, Romania, was the only foreigner in Red Star that season, although his family is member of the Serbian minority in Romania. He came to Red Star after defecting from Ceaușescu's regime in 1988. By the time he came, he was already a well established player. He had already won the European Cup with Steaua in 1986, five Romanian championships, and was an established player of the Romania national team. After three seasons in Belgrade, he continued his career in Spanish La Liga with Valencia, Valladolid and Villarreal, before finishing his career in Mexico playing with Atlante. He made over 50 appearances for the Romania national team and was part of Romanian squad at the 1994 FIFA World Cup, UEFA Euro 1996 and UEFA Euro 2000. After retiring, he became executive director in the Romanian Football Federation responsible for the youth program.
- (Socialist Federal Republic of Yugoslavia) Ilija Najdoski, born in Kruševo, SR Macedonia, was one of the key Vardar players during the 1980s. He joined Red Star in 1988. After four seasons with the Red & Whites, he moved to Spain where he played two seasons in La Liga with Valladolid. He later played with Denizlispor, CSKA Sofia and Sion before retiring. He was Yugoslav international, and later during the mid-1990s one of the most experienced players of the Macedonian national team. For a short period he was in the direction board of the Football Federation of Macedonia. His son, Dino, also became a footballer.
- (Socialist Federal Republic of Yugoslavia) Goran Vasilijević, born in SR Serbia, played with Zemun and Radnički Niš before coming to Red Star. He later played in Bulgaria and Japan.
- (Socialist Federal Republic of Yugoslavia) Rade Tošić, born near Ugljevik, SR Bosnia and Herzegovina, a Bosnian Serb, he played most of the 1980s with Sloboda Tuzla. He became a Yugoslavia national team player and was signed by Hajduk Split in 1988. After two seasons in which he displayed great performances with Hajduk, it became no surprise that it was time for the next step in the evolution of his career, which effectively materialised by his signing with Red Star. He spent two seasons with Red Star at the peak of his career, which later continued in Spain where he played with Mérida and Castellón.

Midfielders:

- (Socialist Federal Republic of Yugoslavia) Vladimir Jugović, born in Milutovac, SR Serbia, was one of the top Yugoslav midfielders during the 1990s. He came at young age to Red Star, and three seasons were all he needed to make the journey from anonymity to the glory of climbing to top continental and world podiums, and win it all. While Red Star fans could obviously be proud for their club being a giant which managed to bring and attract a constellation of stars formed by most of the best players from the entire region, Jugović provided them a different, special, pride for being a product of their academy and managing to shine and earn his spot in such a privileged group. When time arrived for his departure, he joined Sampdoria in 1992, later made an impressive career in Serie A with Juventus, Lazio and Inter. Jugović played in the Italian Serie A until 2001, with the exception of the 1998–99 season that he played in the Spanish La Liga with Atlético Madrid. He played 41 matches for the Yugoslavia national team, scoring on three occasions, playing at the 1998 FIFA World Cup and UEFA Euro 2000. Among all members of this generation, he is the one that won most trophies in his career. After ending his career, he spent a short period in the direction board of Red Star. Later he became certified players agent and spends much of his time scouting players and helping them build a successful career. He has established himself in Vienna, but spends time regularly in Belgrade, Monaco and Palma de Mallorca.
- (Socialist Federal Republic of Yugoslavia) Robert Prosinečki, born in Schwenningen, West Germany, is a son of Yugoslav emigrants. He started playing while still in Germany, in the youth team of Stuttgarter Kickers. In 1980, his family decided to move back to Yugoslavia. Arriving with high recommendations and displaying unique technical skills, Prosinečki was admitted in the renown Dinamo Zagreb academy. He made it to the seniors and debuted for Dinamo in the 1986–87 season. Despite debuting with a goal, Dinamo coach Miroslav Blažević only gave him one more appearance in the league that season. Clearly showing not much appreciation for Prosinečki's talent, Blažević refused to give him a professional contract, further claiming, in what later became his famous quote, that he would eat his shoe if Prosinečki ever becomes a professional player. Consequently, after season ended, Prosinečki went on trial with Red Star, where football director, club legend Dragan Džajić, along with coach Velibor Vasović, immediately recognised his talent and offered him a contract. This resulted in one of the most successful and lucrative transfers ever in football history, in which Red Star got Prosinečki from one of their main rivals, Dinamo, for free! With his signature on the contract still wet, Prosinečki joined the rest of the Yugoslav U20 team on their way to Chile where they showed the world the quality of Yugoslav football at that time, and conquered the gold at the 1987 FIFA World Youth Championship, with Prosinečki taking the best of this opportunity to show his talent and earn the best player of the tournament title. Despite facing a team full of excellent established players, he adapted immediately and earned his spot in Red Star's first team in his first season upon arrival. He proved wrong all those who didn't believe in him, and his four seasons at Red Star became one of the most successful and happiest stories ever in football. When time came for departure, in 1991, it was no surprise his destination could only be what is in number of titles and many other parameters the greatest team in the world, Real Madrid. He spent three seasons in Madrid with Real, and another three also in Spanish La Liga, with Oviedo, Barcelona and Sevilla, one season with each. By this time the old Yugoslavia got dismembered, and Prosinečki chose to represent his father's country, Croatia. He became a regular in the Croatia national team and played with them in the UEFA Euro 1996, 1998 FIFA World Cup (where Croatia finished third) and 2002 FIFA World Cup. After retiring, he became a coach. He started as assistant of Slaven Bilić in the Croatia national team and then it was precisely Red Star that gave him the chance to debut as main coach, where he stayed between 2010 and 2012.
- (Socialist Federal Republic of Yugoslavia) Dejan Savićević, born in Titograd, SR Montenegro, was playing with Budućnost when, during the 1987–88 season, he became a transfer target to all big Yugoslav clubs. The back then 21-year-old talented youngster ended up signing with Red Star at the end of the season and he will become one of club's legends. He was only 20 when he debuted for the Yugoslavia national team and since then became a regular. He stayed four seasons with Red Star, a period which was crowned with the 1991 European Cup and 1991 Intercontinental Cup. Besides, he was awarded as the Yugoslav best athlete that same year. In 1992, he joined A.C. Milan and stayed at San Siro for the next six and a half years. With Milan he won the 1994 UEFA Champions League and the 1994 European Super Cup, besides three Serie A titles and two Supercoppa Italiana titles. He became known by the Milan fans as Maestro and one of his main highlights was the goal he scored against Barcelona in the 1994 UEFA Champions League Final. He left Milan during the 1998–99 winter break and joined again Red Star. However, he stayed only until the end of that season, and left to Rapid Wien where he played two more years before retiring. During the entire 1990s he was among the key players of the Yugoslavia national team, and has played in the 1990 and 1998 FIFA World Cups. After retiring, he coached FR Yugoslavia national team for a period, and in 2004 he became the president of the Football Association of Montenegro.
- (Socialist Federal Republic of Yugoslavia) Siniša Mihajlović, born in Vukovar, SR Croatia, a Serb from Croatia, started playing with a local club, Borovo, from where he moved to Vojvodina. He was part of Vojvodina golden generation that won the Yugoslav championship in 1989. This, obviously, put him under Red Star radars and, year later, he was signed and became one of the most influential and charismatic players for the next seasons. Just as in Vojvodina championship winning season, at Red Star, he was also under coaching of Ljupko Petrović, and the great relation of the two coming from before, proved to be another of the major factors which contributed to Red Star major success. In 1992, when economical and sports sanctions were imposed to FR Yugoslavia not allowing its teams to compete internationally, he moved to Italy where he played the rest of his career with Serie A teams Roma, Sampdoria, Lazio and Inter. He is considered by numerous football specialists as one of the best free-kick takers of all time. He played 63 matches and scored 10 goals for the Yugoslavia national team, and was present at the 1998 FIFA World Cup and UEFA Euro 2000. After retiring, he became a coach.
- (Socialist Federal Republic of Yugoslavia) Vlada Stošić, born in Vranje, SR Serbia, was only 19 when he came to Red Star in 1984. He stayed in the club until the winter break of the 1991–92 season when he moved to Spain, where he played with Mallorca and Betis during the mid-1990s. Then, in 1997, he joined Belodedici in Mexico and played a season at Atlante. He ended his career in Portugal playing with Vitória de Setúbal. He played one match for the Yugoslavia national team in 1990. Since mid-1990s, he became involved in the direction of Betis where he became sports director.
- (Socialist Federal Republic of Yugoslavia) Ivica Momčilović, born in Bojnik, SR Serbia, played with Napredak before joining Red Star. Afterwards, he played in Cyprus and Sweden.

Forwards:

- (Socialist Federal Republic of Yugoslavia) Darko Pančev, born in Skopje, SR Macedonia, started playing with Vardar where he debuted as senior in 1982. He impressed by becoming Yugoslav First League top scorer in the 1983–84 season while being only 19. Red Star brought him in the summer of 1988 and during the four seasons he spent in Belgrade, he became club's main goalscorer. He was again Yugoslav championship top scorer in three consecutive seasons (1989 to 1992), and he won the European Golden Boot in 1991. He made 91 appearances and scored 84 goals in the league for Red Star. In 1992 he signed with Inter, however he didn't adapt well in Italy, and afterwards he played in Germany and Switzerland. Regarded as one of the best Macedonian players ever, he was a regular in the Yugoslavia national team during the late 1980s and played with Yugoslavia in the 1990 FIFA World Cup. Later, he played for the Macedonian national team in their historical first matches between 1993 and 1995. After retiring, he worked shortly in the Macedonian Football Federation and, later, became the sports director of Vardar. However, he decided to step away from football and dedicate to a cafe that he owns in Skopje.
- (Socialist Federal Republic of Yugoslavia) Dragiša Binić, born in Kruševac, SR Serbia, played with Napredak and Radnički Niš before joining Red Star in 1987. He played with Red Star only one season and will play with French side Brest and Spanish Levante before returning to a second spell with Red Star in what was the European Cup winning season. After that season he moved abroad again, playing with a number of clubs such as Slavia Prague, APOEL and Nagoya Grampus. He played for the Yugoslavia national team in 1990 and 1991. After retiring, he entered the direction board of FK Obilić, first as a sports director, and then as club president. He kept his ties with Red Star by being member of the club assembly. He was also the president of Napredak Kruševac. His son, Vladan, is also a footballer.
- (Socialist Federal Republic of Yugoslavia) Vladan Lukić, born in Sopot, SR Serbia, came to Red Star in 1986 aged only 16. His great scoring abilities made him become a regular in the Yugoslavia national team in 1991, however his luck turned around in a match against Austria when he got an injury. He left Red Star in 1993 when he joined Atlético Madrid. During his career, until 2000, he also played with Vojvodina, OFK Beograd, Marbella, Sion, Metz and Paniliakos. In 1998, he played two more games for FR Yugoslavia national team. After retiring, he became the chairman of his hometown club, FK Sopot, and between 2009 and 2012 he was Red Star president.
- (Socialist Federal Republic of Yugoslavia) Ljubiša Milojević, forward, born in SR Serbia, was a Rad academy player who was brought to Red Star exclusively this season. Having debuted as senior with Rad a season earlier, he managed to impress with consistency and skills for such a young player. Brought to be the ultimate option, ended up not having his chance in Europe, and, at the end of the season moved back to Rad. In 1992, he moved to Greece where he gained notoriety at Aris Thessaloniki where he played five seasons. He ended his career at Panetolikos.

It is important to mention the other players which were part of the squad, and which, although not having appearances in the European Cup games, contributed as well by replacing those when injuries, sanctions, or needs of rotation, were necessary. They were:

- (Socialist Federal Republic of Yugoslavia) Aleksandar Ilić, defender, born in Niš, SR Serbia, debuted as senior precisely in this season at Red Star, and moved on to a career that included clubs in Serbia, Spain, Greece, Belgium and Netherlands. He begin his coaching career in 2007, and after Serbia and Greece, he has mostly been working in Saudi Arabia, and, more recently, Iraq.
- (Socialist Federal Republic of Yugoslavia) Dejan Joksimović, midfielder, born in Belgrade, SR Serbia, started his career in the capital by playing with Rad and OFK Beograd, before arriving to Red Star to have his first spell at the club in the season 1987–88. He spent the next two seasons at Vojvodina and Partizan, becoming one of the first and few players who have played for all three top Serbian clubs. Back in 1990 for his second spell at Red Star, he made the jackpot and became part of the team in the most successful season in all Serbian and Yugoslav club football history. At the end of the season, he moved to Sparta Prague and played as well with CD Lugo and Heidelberg United before retiring. Afterwards, he stayed in football by becoming a players agent.
- (Socialist Federal Republic of Yugoslavia) Ivan Adžić, midfielder, born in Belgrade, SR Serbia, is a product of Red Star's academy. Having debuted in the previous season, he made only league appearances in this season, however, unlike most others, he stayed in the club much longer afterwards, all until 1996. Except one 6-months loan spell at Borac Banja Luka in 1991, he was steady in the club and became regular starter in the most difficult period of the UN sanctions. After making 114 league appearances for Red Star, he moved to Logroñés to play in Spanish La Liga, and later played with Spanish Toledo, Borac Čačak back home, before finishing his career in 1999 in Austrian Rapid Wien. Between 2004 and 2006, he was assistant manager to Ratko Dostanić and Walter Zenga at Red Star, and main coach of Montenegrin side Rudar Pljevlja. He held the post of football director in Red Star between 2009 and 2011.
- (Socialist Federal Republic of Yugoslavia) Duško Savić, midfielder, born in SR Bosnia and Herzegovina, a Bosnian Serb, made his name in FK Sloboda Tuzla where Red Star picked him in 1990. Utilitarian player, he moved abroad in 1992 for a spell with Ionikos in Super League Greece.

In 1990, transfer market was already highly active, and this meant a number of players moved in, or out, at winter-break, having been present only half of the season. They were:

- (Socialist Federal Republic of Yugoslavia) Goran Jurić, defender, born in Mostar, SR Bosnia and Herzegovina, a Bosnian Croat, he gained notoriety playing in Velež before joining Red Star. Afterwards, he played in Spain, Croatia and Japan. He was member of the Croatian squad at the 1998 FIFA World Cup where Croatia finished third.
- (Socialist Federal Republic of Yugoslavia) Mitar Mrkela, midfielder, born in Belgrade, SR Serbia, began his career in 1981 with OFK Beograd from where he transferred to Red Star in 1983. When he debuted for OFK at the age of 16 he became, at the time, the youngest ever player to play in the Yugoslav First League. In Red Star, he became one of the key players of the mid-1980s. Unknowing it was the start of one historical season, he started the 1990–91 season by making his 154th league appearance for Red Star, when he decided to accept a move to Dutch side FC Twente. Watching his former teammates reach the glory from a TV in Netherlands, he went on to be a regular player at Twente where he spent two seasons, and afterwards he played in Turkish side Beşiktaş J.K. and Dutch SC Cambuur. He was also a Yugoslav international between 1982 and 1986. Upon retiring, he has been involved with football. In early 2000s, he became president of the Belgrade Football Association. In OFK Beograd, he held the posts of youth team coach and later sports director. At Red Star, he held a post of youth academy director.
- (Socialist Federal Republic of Yugoslavia) Enes Bešić, midfielder, born in SR Bosnia and Herzegovina, made his name at Čelik Zenica where he became a key player between 1980 and 1988, when he was brought by Red Star. A utilitarian player known as a trusted substitute, he made 24 league appearances at Red Star during his two and a half years stay. He made three league and one cup appearance in this season before moving abroad during winter-break and signing with Portuguese side Salgueiros, known during 1990s for having a vast ex-Yugoslav colony.
- (Socialist Federal Republic of Yugoslavia) Milorad Ratković, midfielder, born in Zenica, SR Bosnia and Herzegovina, began his career in 1983 at Čelik Zenica where he was teammate of Bešić for three seasons. Red Star brought him in the summer of 1990 but, by winter, he had managed to get a chance to make only one appearance in league and one in cup. Being an established experienced player, he desired more game play, thus his loan move to Borac Banja Luka was agreed that same winter. He returned to Red Star following season and became a key player in 1991–92. This earned him a move to Spanish La Liga and a contract with Celta de Vigo where his performances made him became a fans favourite in the six seasons he spent there, between 1992 and 1998. He finished his career in Spain with a one-season spell with Sevilla FC.
- (Socialist Federal Republic of Yugoslavia) Slaviša Čula, forward, born in Kostolac, SR Serbia, began his career in 1988 and played with Napredak and Sutjeska before joining Red Star in the summer of 1990. Utilitarian player, he was loaned to Proleter during winter-break of 1990–91. He made ten appearances in league for Red Star before moving to Borac Banja Luka in 1992. Between 1993 and 2001, he will become a globetrotter playing in Sweden, Romania, Israel and Cyprus. He ended his career at his hometown club Rudar Kostolac in 2005.

== Results ==
=== Yugoslav First League ===
Pos	Team	Pld	W	PKW	PKL	L	GF	GA	GD	Pts	Qualification or relegation
1	Red Star Belgrade (C)	36	25	4	2	5	88	35	+53	54	Qualification for European Cup first round
2	Dinamo Zagreb (Note: After the season, Croatian and Slovenian clubs left the Yugoslav federation and formed their own leagues. Dinamo Zagreb, Hajduk Split, Osijek and Rijeka joined 1992 Prva HNL, while Olimpija joined 1991–92 Slovenian PrvaLiga.)	36	20	6	4	6	72	36	+36	46	Qualification for UEFA Cup first round and Prva HNL
3	Partizan	36	18	5	3	10	62	36	+26	41	Qualification for UEFA Cup first round
4	Proleter Zrenjanin	36	17	1	3	15	50	49	+1	35	Qualification for Intertoto Cup
5	Borac Banja Luka	36	14	7	4	11	42	38	+4	35	

Source: rsssf.org
Rules for classification: 1) points; 2) goal difference; 3) number of goals scored.
(C) Champion
Notes:

Date	Opponent	Venue	Result	Scorers
5 August 1990	Vojvodina	H	2–1	Stošić, Savićević
12 August 1990	Rad	H	2–0	Ajder (o.g.), Prosinečki
19 August 1990	Proleter Zrenjanin	A	2–0	Binić, Pančev
26 August 1990	Radnički Niš	H	6–0	Savićević, Pančev (2), Binić, Prosinečki (2)
2 September 1990	Željezničar	A	2–0	Binić, Prosinečki
15 September 1990	Olimpija	H	2–1	Pančev, Savićević
23 September 1990	Budućnost	A	0–2	
26 September 1990	Velež	H	2–0	Pančev, Savićević
29 September 1990	Rijeka	A	0–0 (3–1 p)	
7 October 1990	Borac Banja Luka	H	2–0	Pančev, Stegnjajić (o.g.)
13 October 1990	Partizan	A	1–1 (5–3 p)	Savićević
20 October 1990	Zemun	H	5–1	Belodedici, Savićević, Pančev, Jugović (2)
18 November 1990	Dinamo Zagreb	H	3–1	Stošić, Binić (2)
25 November 1990	Osijek	A	0–2	
2 December 1990	Sarajevo	H	4–1	Pančev (3), Marović
9 December 1990	Spartak Subotica	H	4–0	Pančev (3), Binić
16 December 1990	Sloboda Tuzla	A	1–0	Pančev
19 December 1990	Hajduk Split	A	1–1 (5–3 p)	Pančev
17 February 1991	Vojvodina	A	1–1 (5–4 p)	Binić
23 February 1991	Rad	A	1–0	Savićević
2 March 1991	Proleter Zrenjanin	H	1–2	Pančev
10 March 1991	Radnički Niš	A	4–0	Binić (2), Kuleski (o.g.), Pančev
16 March 1991	Željezničar	H	3–1	Prosinečki (2), Binić
23 March 1991	Olimpija	A	6–0	Binić, Prosinečki (2), Stošić, Jugović, Pančev
31 March 1991	Budućnost	H	4–1	Pančev (2), Binić, Najdoski
6 April 1991	Velež	A	3–3 (3–5 p)	Milojević, Mihajlović, Jugović
14 April 1991	Rijeka	H	2–1	Pančev (2)
20 April 1991	Borac Banja Luka	A	2–2 (5–6 p)	Adžić, Stošić (pen.)
27 April 1991	Partizan	H	3–1	Najdoski, Prosinečki, Jugović
4 May 1991	Zemun	A	3–1	Binić, Jugović, Pančev
18 May 1991	Dinamo Zagreb	A	2–3	Pančev (2)
22 May 1991	Osijek	H	5–1	Pančev (3), Jugović, Savićević
2 June 1991	Sarajevo	A	2–3	Pančev (2)
5 June 1991	Hajduk Split	H	1–0	Pančev
9 June 1991	Spartak Subotica	A	2–1	Pančev (pen.), Prosinečki
15 June 1991	Sloboda Tuzla	H	4–3	Lukić, Pančev (2), Prosinečki

=== Yugoslav Cup ===
Date	Opponent	Venue	Result	Scorers
8 August 1990	Belišće	A	4–2	Pančev, Prosinečki, Binić, Savićević
15 August 1990	Vojvodina	A	2–0	Pančev (2)
21 August 1990	Vojvodina	H	2–1	Mrkela, Pančev
10 October 1990	Proleter Zrenjanin	H	4–1	Binić, Prosinečki, Pančev, Savićević
21 November 1990	Proleter Zrenjanin	A	0–1	
3 April 1991	OFK Beograd	H	3–0	Pančev, Najdoski, Savićević
17 April 1991	OFK Beograd	A	3–3	Binić (2), Mihajlović
8 May 1991	Hajduk Split	N	0–1	

=== European Cup ===
==== First round ====
19 September 1990	Red Star Belgrade (Socialist Federal Republic of Yugoslavia)	1–1	(Switzerland) Grasshopper	Red Star Stadium, Belgrade
17:30 CEST	Binić 44'	Report	Közle 14'	Attendance: 60,000; Referee: Carlo Longhi (Italy)

3 October 1990	Grasshopper (Switzerland)	1–4	(Socialist Federal Republic of Yugoslavia) Red Star Belgrade	Hardturm, Zürich
20:00 CEST	Közle 62'	Report	Pančev 11'; Prosinečki 49' (pen.), 84' (pen.); Radinović 58'	Attendance: 25,500; Referee: José Rosa dos Santos (Portugal)

==== Second round ====
24 October 1990	Red Star Belgrade (Socialist Federal Republic of Yugoslavia)	3–0	(Scotland) Rangers	Red Star Stadium, Belgrade
17:00 CEST	Brown 8' (o.g.); Prosinečki 65'; Pančev 73'	Report		Attendance: 75,000; Referee: Joël Quiniou (France)

7 November 1990	Rangers (Scotland)	1–1	(Socialist Federal Republic of Yugoslavia) Red Star Belgrade	Ibrox Stadium, Glasgow
21:00 CET	McCoist 75'	Report	Pančev 51'	Attendance: 23,821; Referee: Bo Karlsson (Sweden)

==== Quarter-finals ====
6 March 1991	Red Star Belgrade (Socialist Federal Republic of Yugoslavia)	3–0	(East Germany) Dynamo Dresden	Red Star Stadium, Belgrade
15:30 CET	Prosinečki 22'; Binić 43'; Savićević 56'	Report		Attendance: 85,000; Referee: Alexey Spirin (USSR)

20 March 1991	Dynamo Dresden (East Germany)	1–2	(Socialist Federal Republic of Yugoslavia) Red Star Belgrade	Rudolf-Harbig-Stadion, Dresden
20:15 CET	Gütschow 3' (pen.)	Report	Savićević 52'; Pančev 69'	Attendance: 15,000; Referee: Emilio Soriano Aladrén (Spain)

The match was stopped in the 78th minute by the match referee Emilio Soriano Aladrén, due to Dynamo Dresden fans causing commotion in the stands and throwing objects onto the field. Red Star Belgrade led 2–1 at the time. UEFA awarded a 3–0 win to Red Star Belgrade. Red Star Belgrade won 6–0 on aggregate.

==== Semi-finals ====
10 April 1991	Bayern Munich (West Germany)	1–2	(Socialist Federal Republic of Yugoslavia) Red Star Belgrade	Olympiastadion, Munich
20:15 CEST	Wohlfarth 23'	Report	Pančev 45'; Savićević 70'	Attendance: 65,000; Referee: Hubert Forstinger (Austria)

24 April 1991	Red Star Belgrade (Socialist Federal Republic of Yugoslavia)	2–2	(West Germany) Bayern Munich	Red Star Stadium, Belgrade
20:15 CEST	Mihajlović 24'; Augenthaler 90' (o.g.)	Report	Augenthaler 61'; Bender 66'	Attendance: 80,000; Referee: Bruno Galler (Switzerland)

==== Final ====
29 May 1991	Red Star Belgrade (Socialist Federal Republic of Yugoslavia)	0–0 (5–3 p)	(France) Marseille	Stadio San Nicola, Bari
20:15 CEST		Report		Attendance: 56,000; Referee: Tullio Lanese (Italy)
	Penalties
	Prosinečki (penalty scored); Binić (penalty scored); Belodedici (penalty scored); Mihajlović (penalty scored); Pančev (penalty scored)		(penalty missed) Amoros; (penalty scored) Casoni; (penalty scored) Papin; (penalty scored) Mozer

== See also ==
- List of Red Star Belgrade seasons
