= 1991–92 Red Star Belgrade season =

Red Star Belgrade
1991–92 season
- Chairman: Svetozar Mijailović
- Manager: Vladica Popović
- Yugoslav First League: 1st
- Yugoslav Cup: Runners-up
- European Cup: Group stage
- European Super Cup: Runners-up
- Intercontinental Cup: Winners
- Top goalscorer: League: Darko Pančev (25); All: Darko Pančev (36)

During the 1991–92 season, Red Star Belgrade competed in the Yugoslav First League, Yugoslav Cup, European Cup, European Super Cup and Intercontinental Cup.

== Squad ==
Name	Yugoslav First League		Yugoslav Cup		European Cup		European Super Cup		Intercontinental Cup		Total	
Name	Apps	Goals	Apps	Goals	Apps	Goals	Apps	Goals	Apps	Goals	Apps	Goals
Goalkeepers
(Socialist Federal Republic of Yugoslavia) Dragoje Leković	17	0	6	0	4	0	0	0	0	0	27	0
(Socialist Federal Republic of Yugoslavia) Zvonko Milojević	13	0	3	0	6	0	1	0	1	0	24	0
(Socialist Federal Republic of Yugoslavia) Milić Jovanović	3	0	1	0	1	0	0	0	0	0	5	0
Defenders
(Socialist Federal Republic of Yugoslavia) Duško Radinović	30	4	7	0	10	1	1	0	1	0	49	5
(Socialist Federal Republic of Yugoslavia) Ilija Najdoski	29	2	8	0	5	0	1	0	1	0	44	2
(Romania) Miodrag Belodedici	24	1	6	0	8	0	1	0	1	0	40	1
(Socialist Federal Republic of Yugoslavia) Miroslav Tanjga	18	0	6	0	7	1	1	0	0	0	32	1
(Socialist Federal Republic of Yugoslavia) Goran Vasilijević	15	0	4	0	6	0	1	0	1	0	27	0
(Socialist Federal Republic of Yugoslavia) Saša Nedeljković	10	0	3	0	4	0	0	0	0	0	17	0
(Socialist Federal Republic of Yugoslavia) Mitko Stojkovski	7	0	2	0	1	0	0	0	0	0	10	0
(Socialist Federal Republic of Yugoslavia) Rade Tošić	5	0	1	0	0	0	0	0	0	0	6	0
(Socialist Federal Republic of Yugoslavia) Aleksandar Kristić	3	0	2	0	0	0	0	0	0	0	5	0
Midfielders
(Socialist Federal Republic of Yugoslavia) Vladimir Jugović	29	4	9	3	10	0	1	0	1	2	50	9
(Socialist Federal Republic of Yugoslavia) Siniša Mihajlović	24	8	8	3	10	4	1	0	1	0	44	15
(Socialist Federal Republic of Yugoslavia) Milorad Ratković	27	4	6	0	8	3	0	0	1	0	42	7
(Socialist Federal Republic of Yugoslavia) Dejan Savićević	22	5	7	2	4	2	1	0	1	0	35	9
(Socialist Federal Republic of Yugoslavia) Duško Savić	5	0	2	0	2	0	0	0	0	0	9	0
(Socialist Federal Republic of Yugoslavia) Ivan Adžić	3	0	4	0	0	0	0	0	0	0	7	0
(Socialist Federal Republic of Yugoslavia) Nebojša Krupniković	2	0	0	0	0	0	0	0	0	0	2	0
(Socialist Federal Republic of Yugoslavia) Đorđe Aćimović	1	0	0	0	0	0	0	0	0	0	1	0
Forwards
(Socialist Federal Republic of Yugoslavia) Darko Pančev	28	25	9	4	9	6	1	0	1	1	48	36
(Socialist Federal Republic of Yugoslavia) Ilija Ivić	28	8	9	1	8	1	1	0	0	0	46	10
(Socialist Federal Republic of Yugoslavia) Vladan Lukić	13	7	3	2	4	2	0	0	0	0	20	11
(Socialist Federal Republic of Yugoslavia) Elvir Bolić	11	2	4	0	4	0	0	0	0	0	19	2
(Socialist Federal Republic of Yugoslavia) Slaviša Čula	8	0	2	1	2	1	0	0	0	0	12	2
Players sold or loaned out during the season
(Socialist Federal Republic of Yugoslavia) Vlada Stošić	17	4	3	1	6	1	1	0	1	0	28	6
(Socialist Federal Republic of Yugoslavia) Predrag Jovanović	3	0	0	0	3	0	0	0	0	0	6	0

== Results ==
=== Yugoslav First League ===
Pos	Team	Pld	W	PKW	PKL	L	GF	GA	GD	Pts
1	Red Star Belgrade (C)	33	23	4	1	5	77	24	+53	50
2	Partizan	33	21	4	6	2	59	18	+41	46
3	Vojvodina	33	19	4	1	9	45	31	+14	42
4	OFK Beograd	33	19	3	5	6	62	36	+26	41
5	Proleter Zrenjanin	33	16	3	1	13	41	43	−2	35

Source: rsssf.org
Rules for classification: 1) points; 2) goal difference; 3) number of goals scored.
(C) Champion

Date	Opponent	Venue	Result	Scorers
11 August 1991	Vardar	A	0–1	
18 August 1991	Pelister	H	4–1	Lukić, Stošić, Radinović, Pančev
25 August 1991	Proleter Zrenjanin	A	4–0	Mihajlović (2), Ivić, Stošić
31 August 1991	Sloboda Tuzla	H	4–0	Mihajlović, Lukić (2), Radinović
8 September 1991	Budućnost	A	0–0 (4–3 p)	
13 September 1991	OFK Beograd	H	0–2	
22 September 1991	Partizan	A	2–2 (6–5 p)	Pančev, Mihajlović
31 September 1991	Rad	H	3–1	Pančev (2), Lukić
6 October 1991	Sarajevo	A	0–1	
9 October 1991	Sutjeska Nikšić	H	2–1	Pančev, Stošić
19 October 1991	Velež	H	3–1	Ivić, Lukić, Savićević
26 October 1991	Vojvodina	H	5–0	Pančev, Savićević (2), Lukić, Stošić
3 November 1991	Radnički Niš	A	2–1	Ratković, Lukić
16 November 1991	Spartak Subotica	H	6–1	Radinović, Ivić, Pančev (3), Najdoski
23 November 1991	Borac Banja Luka	A	0–2	
30 November 1991	Zemun	A	1–0	Pančev (pen.)
15 December 1991	Željezničar	H	5–0	Jugović, Ratković (2), Pančev, Ivić
16 February 1992	Vardar	H	3–2	Ivić, Najdoski, Pančev
23 February 1992	Pelister	A	2–0	Belodedici, Radinović
29 February 1992	Proleter Zrenjanin	H	5–0	Mihajlović, Pančev (3), Savićević
8 March 1992	Sloboda Tuzla	A	3–0	Bolić, Pančev (2)
11 March 1992	Budućnost	H	2–0	Mihajlović, Pančev
14 March 1992	OFK Beograd	A	2–1	Pančev, Savićević
22 March 1992	Partizan	H	0–0 (4–2 p)	
28 March 1992	Rad	A	2–1	Mihajlović, Pančev
5 April 1992	Sarajevo	H	3–1	Pančev (3)
11 April 1992	Sutjeska Nikšić	A	1–1 (5–6 p)	Pančev
19 April 1992	Velež	A	3–0 (f)	
26 April 1992	Vojvodina	A	1–3	Pančev
30 April 1992	Radnički Niš	H	4–0	Ivić (2), Mihajlović, Bolić
3 May 1992	Spartak Subotica	A	0–0 (3–1 p)	
10 May 1992	Borac Banja Luka	H	2–0	Jugović (2)
17 May 1992	Zemun	H	3–1	Ratković, Ivić, Jugović

=== Yugoslav Cup ===
Date	Opponent	Venue	Result	Scorers
14 August 1991	Budućnost	A	2–0	Savićević, Lukić
28 August 1991	Bečej	H	4–3	Jugović, Savićević (pen.), Stošić, Pančev
25 September 1991	Bečej	A	2–1	Lukić, Jugović
12 February 1992	Rad	A	1–2	Pančev
19 February 1992	Rad	H	3–0	Mihajlović, Ivić, Pančev (pen.)
26 February 1992	Napredak Kruševac	A	2–2	Mihajlović, Jugović
8 April 1992	Napredak Kruševac	H	1–0	Čula
14 May 1992	Partizan	H	0–1	
21 May 1992	Partizan	A	2–2	Mihajlović, Pančev

=== European Cup ===
==== First round ====
17 September 1991	Red Star Belgrade (Socialist Federal Republic of Yugoslavia)	4–0	(Northern Ireland) Portadown	Vasutas stadion, Szeged
	Tanjga 15'; Stošić 37'; Mihajlović 76', 84'	Report		Attendance: 8,000; Referee: Hasan Ceylan (Turkey)

2 October 1991	Portadown (Northern Ireland)	0–4	(Socialist Federal Republic of Yugoslavia) Red Star Belgrade	Shamrock Park, Portadown
		Report	Ratković 19', 54'; Pančev 38'; Radinović 87'	Attendance: 6,000; Referee: Tore Hollung (Norway)

==== Second round ====
23 October 1991	Red Star Belgrade (Socialist Federal Republic of Yugoslavia)	3–1	(Cyprus) Apollon Limassol	Vasutas stadion, Szeged
	Pančev 14'; Lukić 68'; Savićević 81' (pen.)	Report	Ptak 39'	Attendance: 2,500; Referee: Vadim Zhuk (Soviet Union)

6 November 1991	Apollon Limassol (Cyprus)	0–2	(Socialist Federal Republic of Yugoslavia) Red Star Belgrade	Tsirio Stadium, Limassol
		Report	Savićević 47'; Lukić 74' (pen.)	Attendance: 15,000; Referee: Heinz Holzmann (Austria)

==== Group stage ====
Pos	Team	Pld	W	D	L	GF	GA	GD	Pts	Qualification	SAM	RSB	AND	PAN
1	(Italy) Sampdoria	6	3	2	1	10	5	+5	8	Advance to final	—	2–0	2–0	1–1
2	(Socialist Federal Republic of Yugoslavia) Red Star Belgrade	6	3	0	3	9	10	−1	6		1–3	—	3–2	1–0
3	(Belgium) Anderlecht	6	2	2	2	8	9	−1	6		3–2	3–2	—	0–0
4	(Greece) Panathinaikos	6	0	4	2	1	4	−3	4		0–0	0–2	0–0	—

Source: UEFA

27 November 1991 1	Sampdoria (Italy)	2–0	(Socialist Federal Republic of Yugoslavia) Red Star Belgrade	Stadio Luigi Ferraris, Genoa
	Mancini 7'; Vialli 73'	Report		Attendance: 30,000; Referee: Gérard Biguet (France)

12 December 1991 2	Red Star Belgrade (Socialist Federal Republic of Yugoslavia)	3–2	(Belgium) Anderlecht	Bozsik József Stadion, Budapest
	Ratković 19'; Ivić 67'; Pančev 85'	Report	Lamptey 33'; Nilis 54'	Attendance: 5,000; Referee: Leif Sundell (Sweden)

4 March 1992 3	Panathinaikos (Greece)	0–2	(Socialist Federal Republic of Yugoslavia) Red Star Belgrade	Olympic Stadium, Athens
		Report	Pančev 68', 86'	Attendance: 60,000; Referee: Alexey Spirin (Russia)

18 March 1992 4	Red Star Belgrade (Socialist Federal Republic of Yugoslavia)	1–0	(Greece) Panathinaikos	Balgarska Armia Stadium, Sofia
	Mihajlović 51' (pen.)	Report		Attendance: 25,000; Referee: Emilio Soriano Aladrén (Spain)

1 April 1992 5	Red Star Belgrade (Socialist Federal Republic of Yugoslavia)	1–3	(Italy) Sampdoria	Balgarska Armia Stadium, Sofia
	Mihajlović 11'	Report	Katanec 33'; Vasilijević 41' (o.g.); Mancini 75'	Attendance: 33,000; Referee: José Rosa dos Santos (Portugal)

15 April 1992 6	Anderlecht (Belgium)	3–2	(Socialist Federal Republic of Yugoslavia) Red Star Belgrade	Constant Vanden Stock Stadium, Brussels
	Oliveira 3'; Bosman 44'; Degryse 83'	Report	Pančev 5'; Čula 82'	Attendance: 9,000; Referee: Joël Quiniou (France)

=== European Super Cup ===
19 November 1991	Manchester United (England)	1–0	(Socialist Federal Republic of Yugoslavia) Red Star Belgrade	Old Trafford, Manchester
	McClair 67'	Report		Attendance: 22,000; Referee: Mario van der Ende (Netherlands)

=== Intercontinental Cup ===
8 December 1991	Red Star Belgrade (Socialist Federal Republic of Yugoslavia)	3–0	(Chile) Colo-Colo	National Stadium, Tokyo
	Jugović 19', 58'; Pančev 72'	Report		Attendance: 60,000; Referee: Kurt Röthlisberger (Switzerland)

== See also ==
- List of Red Star Belgrade seasons
