= 1991–92 Yugoslav First League =

Yugoslav First League
- Location of teams competing in the 1991-92 Yugoslav First League
- Season: 1991–92
- Dates: 11 August 1991 – 24 May 1992
- Champions: Red Star; 19th domestic title
- Runner up: Partizan
- Champions League: No Team
- UEFA Cup: No Teams
- Top goalscorer: Darko Pančev (25)

The First League of Yugoslavia's 1991/1992 season was the 64th edition of the Yugoslav First League, the premier football club competition of SFR Yugoslavia. It was the last edition in which professional football teams from SR Bosnia and Herzegovina (with one exception) and SR Macedonia participated, as well as the last of the SFR Yugoslavia in general as the First League of FR Yugoslavia was established the following season. Red Star Belgrade won the competition.

Before the start of the season, Croatia and Slovenia were already in the process of seeking independence from Yugoslavia. Teams from Croatia and Slovenia that qualified for the competition left it before the season started. Dinamo Zagreb, Hajduk Split, NK Osijek, NK Rijeka and (newly promoted) NK Zagreb left to join newly created Croatian championship, while Olimpija Ljubljana left to join newly created Slovenian championship. Thus, this season was competed only by teams from SR Serbia, SR Montenegro, SR Bosnia and Herzegovina and SR Macedonia. During the course of the season, first Macedonia, and then Bosnia and Herzegovina also declared independence from Yugoslavia, and the Bosnian War started. Because of that, Željezničar Sarajevo missed the second half of the season, and three more Bosnian teams (Sarajevo, Sloboda Tuzla, and Velež Mostar) left the competition six rounds before its completion. Remaining Bosnian team (Borac Banja Luka) and two Macedonian teams played the whole season.

After the season was concluded, Macedonian teams left the competition to join the newly created Macedonian First League. Three ethnic football leagues were created in Bosnia and Herzegovina for the next season: first, the Croats formed the First League of Herzeg-Bosnia, then the Bosniaks formed the Championship of Bosnia and Herzegovina which later became the UEFA recognized competition. Lastly, the Serbs formed the First League of the Republika Srpska. Thus, the following 1992–93 season of the Yugoslav First League was played by teams from the Federal Republic of Yugoslavia (Serbia and Montenegro) and one Bosnian team – Borac Banja Luka which played its home games in Belgrade. Because of the large numbers of teams leaving the league, seven new teams were promoted to the first league for 1992–93 season, all from Serbia and Montenegro: Napredak Kruševac, Hajduk Kula, Bečej, Mogren Budva, Kikinda, Radnički Novi Beograd, and FK Pristina.

== Overview ==
Due to the wars in Slovenia and Croatia, the Croatian Football Federation banned the participation of clubs from the territory of Croatia in the championship of Yugoslavia. The presidency of Football Association of Yugoslavia decided to fill the First League with teams that were relegated in the previous season (Budućnost, Sloboda and Spartak) and to promote teams from the second league (Vardar, OFK Belgrade and Pelister). Ljubljana wanted to participate, but they were under pressure from their football association, and decide to leave Yugoslav competition before first round match against Partizan in Belgrade. Therefore, Football Association of Yugoslavia promoted Sutjeska.

Red Star Belgrade, as the current winner of the 1990–91 European Cup and eventual winner of 1991 Intercontinental Cup, was favorite to win the championship. Slobodan Marović, Robert Prosinečki, Refik Šabanadžović, Dragiša Binić, Stevan Stojanović and coach Ljupko Petrović left the team, while Dragoje Leković, Milorad Ratković and Ilija Ivić joined the team in the summer transfer window, while Vladica Popović became the new coach.

Partizan appointed Ivica Osim, the current head coach of the Yugoslavia national football team, as new coach. Ljubomir Vorkapić, Nebojša Gudelj, Branko Brnović, Slobodan Krčmarević and Zlatko Zahovič were brought to the club, while Gordan Petrić and Slaviša Jokanović returned from obligatory military service in Yugoslav People's Army.

However, growing tensions in Bosnia and Herzegovina made it impossible to finish the season regularly. In the 25th round on March 29, 1992, the team of Radnički Niš did not came to their match against Velež in Mostar, fearing for their safety, so the victory was awarded to Velež. In the next round, on April 5, 1992, the match Željezničar-Rad in Sarajevo did not begin, because before the game shootings started in the vicinity of Grbavica Stadium. Since that round, the teams from Bosnia and Herzegovina (except Borac from Banja Luka) are no longer able to organize matches on their home ground, nor have they been able to assemble their teams for away matches. Association of First Federal League clubs decided to cancel all the matches played by Željezničar in the spring part of the season, since the club played less than half of the matches in the spring part. The matches played by Sarajevo, Velež and Sloboda were recognized because these clubs played more than half of the matches in the spring part of the season, scheduled matches were registered as wins for their opponents, while the scheduled matches between these three clubs were also deleted.

In the end, Red Star won the title with 50 points, while Partizan was second with 46 points. If the results of the matches of Sarajevo, Velež and Sloboda were deleted too, new champion would become Partizan.

== League table ==
Pos	Team	Pld	W	PKW	PKL	L	GF	GA	GD	Pts
1	Red Star Belgrade (C)	33	23	4	1	5	77	24	+53	50
2	Partizan	33	21	4	6	2	59	18	+41	46
3	Vojvodina	33	19	4	1	9	45	31	+14	42
4	OFK Beograd	33	19	3	5	6	62	36	+26	41
5	Proleter Zrenjanin	33	16	3	1	13	41	43	−2	35
6	Vardar	33	15	4	2	12	50	34	+16	34
7	Rad	33	14	1	2	16	48	43	+5	29
8	Borac Banja Luka	33	11	6	4	12	24	32	−8	28
9	Sarajevo	32	12	3	3	14	33	45	−12	27
10	Zemun	33	12	2	5	14	44	43	+1	26
11	Radnički Niš	33	12	2	3	16	37	48	−11	26
12	Budućnost	33	10	3	5	15	30	32	−2	23
13	Sutjeska Nikšić	33	11	1	5	16	40	47	−7	23
14	Velež	32	10	3	2	17	34	53	−19	23
15	Pelister	33	9	2	1	21	30	57	−27	20
16	Spartak Subotica	33	7	3	6	17	24	49	−25	17
17	Sloboda Tuzla	31	7	2	1	21	21	61	−40	16
18	Željezničar	17	6	3	0	8	18	24	−6	15

Source: rsssf.org
Rules for classification: 1) points; 2) goal difference; 3) number of goals scored.
(C) Champion

== Results ==
Results in brackets indicate the results from penalty shoot-outs whenever games were drawn.

Home \ Away	BBL	BUD	OFK	PAR	PEL	PRO	RAD	RNI	RSB	SAR	SLO	SPA	SUT	VAR	VEL	VOJ	ZEM	ŽEL
Borac Banja Luka		0–0^{(2–0)}	0–0^{(5–3)}	0–1	1–0	0–0^{(1–2)}	1–1^{(2–3)}	2–0	2–0	0–0^{(2–4)}	2–2^{(4–2)}	1–0	1–0	1–0	1–0	0–3	1–1^{(4–3)}	– (Note: Match has not been played due to the withdrawal of Sarajevo, Sloboda, Velež and Željezničar due to the Bosnian War.)
Budućnost	1–0		0–0^{(2–3)}	0–0^{(4–3)}	2–0	0–1	3–0	2–0	0–0^{(3–4)}	3–0 (Note: Match awarded due to the withdrawal of Sarajevo, Sloboda and Velež due to the Bosnian War.)	3–0	2–0	1–0	1–1^{(2–3)}	3–0	1–2	0–1	3–1 (Note: Match annulled due to the withdrawal of Željezničar due to the Bosnian War.)
OFK Beograd	3–0	2–1		0–6	4–0	1–0	2–0	1–0	1–2	1–3	3–0	4–1	3–1	3–1	5–1	2–0	2–2^{(4–2)}	3–0
Partizan	2–0	2–0	4–1		3–0	4–1	1–0	1–1^{(4–3)}	2–2^{(5–6)}	3–0	3–0	0–0^{(2–1)}	1–0	2–0	3–1	1–0	3–1	6–1
Pelister	0–0^{(3–5)}	1–1^{(3–1)}	1–2	0–2		2–1	2–1	0–1	0–2	1–0	3–1	0–2	1–1^{(4–2)}	0–3 (Note: Match awarded after it was abandoned due to the riots at the Tumbe Kafe stadium.)	3–0	0–2	1–0	1–0
Proleter Zrenjanin	2–0	1–0	3–0	1–1^{(4–6)}	2–0		4–1	1–0	0–4	3–0	3–0	0–0^{(4–3)}	2–1	3–0	3–0	1–1^{(4–3)}	3–2	1–0
Rad	1–2	2–0	2–1	1–2	5–2	4–0		1–0	1–2	3–0	1–0	3–0	3–1	0–1	1–1^{(5–6)}	2–0	2–0	1–1^{(2–4)}
Radnički Niš	1–0	0–1	1–2	1–3	2–0	0–1	2–1		1–2	3–1	2–0	1–0	4–1	1–0	2–0	1–1^{(3–4)}	2–2^{(4–3)}	–
Red Star	2–0	2–0	0–2	0–0^{(4–2)}	4–1	5–0	3–1	4–0		3–1	4–0	6–1	2–1	3–2	3–1	5–0	3–1	5–0
Sarajevo	3–0	4–1	0–3	0–0^{(3–4)}	0–3	3–0	2–1	3–1	1–0		–	2–1	1–0	1–0	0–0^{(6–7)}	2–1	3–2	–
Sloboda Tuzla	0–0^{(4–3)}	4–0	0–3	0–1	4–1	0–1	0–3	1–4	0–3	1–0		1–0	0–3	0–1	1–1^{(2–1)}	0–3	1–0	2–0
Spartak Subotica	0–1	0–0^{(4–3)}	1–1^{(3–4)}	0–1	3–2	1–2	0–3	2–2^{(4–2)}	0–0^{(1–3)}	0–0^{(5–3)}	2–1		2–1	0–0^{(4–5)}	0–0^{(3–5)}	2–0	2–0	1–0
Sutjeska Nikšić	0–2	0–0^{(3–4)}	1–1^{(0–3)}	1–2	4–1	1–0	3–0	2–2^{(6–7)}	1–1^{(6–5)}	1–0	4–0	3–2		2–1	2–1	0–0^{(4–5)}	2–0	2–0
Vardar	1–1^{(3–4)}	3–2	2–2^{(3–5)}	2–2^{(4–3)}	2–1	3–0	3–1	1–0	1–0	3–0	4–0	3–0	6–0		3–0	1–0	1–1^{(1–3)}	3–1
Velež	0–3	1–0	2–3	1–0	0–3	3–0	2–0	3–0	0–3	2–2^{(4–3)}	–	4–1	3–0	1–0		1–0	2–0	–
Vojvodina	2–1	1–0	1–1^{(4–2)}	2–1	1–0	3–1	1–0	0–1	3–1	3–1	3–1	1–0	2–0	2–0	2–1		1–1^{(5–3)}	2–1
Zemun	3–1	2–1	0–0^{(4–2)}	1–1^{(1–3)}	1–0	2–1	1–2	3–0	0–1	2–0	0–1	4–0	2–1	3–1	2–1	1–2		1–0
Željezničar	3–0	2–1	1–1^{(5–4)}	1–1^{(5–4)}	0–1	1–0	–	3–1	–	0–0^{(5–4)}	0–2	–	–	1–0	4–1	–	1–3	

Source: DataSoccer.it
Legend: Blue = home team win; Yellow = draw; Red = away team win.

== Winning squad ==
Champions: Red Star Belgrade
Player	League	
Player	Matches	Goals
Duško Radinović	30	4
Vladimir Jugović	29	4
Ilija Najdoski	29	2
Darko Pančev	28	25
Ilija Ivić	27	8
Milorad Ratković	26	4
Siniša Mihajlović	24	8
Miodrag Belodedici	24	1
Dejan Savićević	22	5
Miroslav Tanjga	18	0
Vlada Stošić	17	4
Dragoje Leković (goalkeeper)	17	0
Goran Vasilijević	15	0
Vladan Lukić	13	7
Zvonko Milojević (goalkeeper)	13	0
Elvir Bolić (Note: arrived from Čelik Zenica in December 1991)	11	2
Saša Nedeljković	9	0
Slaviša Čula	8	0
Mitko Stojkovski	7	0
Duško Savić	5	0
Rade Tošić	5	0
Ivan Adžić	3	0
Milić Jovanović (goalkeeper)	3	0
Predrag Jovanović	3	0
Aleksandar Kristić	3	0
Nebojša Krupniković	2	0
Đorđe Aćimović	1	0
Head coach: Vladica Popović

== Top scorers ==
Rank	Player	Club	Goals
1	(Socialist Republic of Macedonia) Darko Pančev	Red Star	25
2	(Croatia) Mario Stanić	Željezničar	15
2	(Socialist Federal Republic of Yugoslavia) (Federal Republic of Yugoslavia) Zoran Lončar	OFK Beograd	15
4	(Socialist Federal Republic of Yugoslavia) (Federal Republic of Yugoslavia) Dejan Čurović	Zemun	12
4	(Socialist Federal Republic of Yugoslavia) (Federal Republic of Yugoslavia) Predrag Mijatović	Partizan	12
4	(Socialist Federal Republic of Yugoslavia) (Federal Republic of Yugoslavia) Ljubinko Drulović	Rad	12
7	(Socialist Federal Republic of Yugoslavia) (Federal Republic of Yugoslavia) Slobodan Krčmarević	Partizan	11
7	(Croatia) Milenko Špoljarić	OFK Beograd	11
9	(Socialist Republic of Macedonia) Vasil Gunev	Vardar	10
9	(Socialist Federal Republic of Yugoslavia) (Federal Republic of Yugoslavia) Dragan Đukanović	OFK Beograd	10
9	(Socialist Federal Republic of Yugoslavia) (Federal Republic of Yugoslavia) Ljubiša Milojević	Rad	10
9	(Socialist Federal Republic of Yugoslavia) (Federal Republic of Yugoslavia) Dejan Petković	Radnički Niš	10

== See also ==
- 1991–92 Yugoslav Second League
- 1991–92 Yugoslav Cup
