= 1991 European Super Cup =

- Matchday programme
Manchester United	Red Star Belgrade
(England)	(Socialist Federal Republic of Yugoslavia)
1	0
- Date: 19 November 1991
- Venue: Old Trafford, Manchester
- Referee: Mario van der Ende (Netherlands)
- Attendance: 22,110

The 1991 European Super Cup was the 16th European Super Cup, an annual football match organised by UEFA (the Union of European Football Associations) and contested by the winners of the previous season's European Cup and Cup Winners' Cup competitions. The match was played on 19 November 1991 and featured the 1990–91 European Cup winners, Red Star Belgrade, and Manchester United, winners of the 1990–91 Cup Winners' Cup. It was meant to be played over two legs, but due to the political unrest in Yugoslavia at the time, UEFA decided that only the leg at Manchester United's home, Old Trafford, would be played.

The match kicked off at 19:15 GMT, in front of a crowd of 22,110. Red Star Belgrade were the better team in the first half, but had two attempts cleared off the line by Manchester United players, and missed the goal with their other shots. In the second half, Red Star started the stronger of the two again, but United improved, playing counter-attacking football. In the 67th minute, Brian McClair scored the only goal of the game, a close-range rebound after a shot by Neil Webb. United went close to adding a second goal, but the game finished 1–0, giving Manchester United their first and only European Super Cup title.

== Background ==
Red Star Belgrade qualified for the Super Cup as the winners of the 1990–91 European Cup; they had beaten Marseille 5–3 on penalties in the final in Bari, Italy, after the match had finished 0–0 after extra time; that game was described as "the most boring final match in European Cup history" by one of the Red Star players, Siniša Mihajlović. The other Super Cup place went to Manchester United, winners of the 1990–91 European Cup Winners' Cup, having upset the strong favourites Barcelona 2–1 in the final in Rotterdam, Netherlands. It was the first Super Cup appearance for either side; although Manchester United had won the European Cup in 1968, the Super Cup had not been established at that point.

It was the first time that Manchester United and Red Star Belgrade had met in a competitive match since their 1957–58 European Cup quarter-final. After beating Red Star 5–4 on aggregate, the aircraft on which the Manchester United team were travelling home crashed on its third attempt to take off from Munich-Riem Airport. In total, 23 people were killed in the Munich air disaster, including eight of the United team, three staff members and eight journalists; a further two players never played football again as a result of the injuries they suffered. The Manchester United manager at the time of the disaster, Sir Matt Busby, was in attendance at the Super Cup, while Red Star manager Vladica Popović had played against Manchester United in 1958.

== Pre-match ==
Typically, the Super Cup was played over two legs, but due to the volatile situation in Yugoslavia, which was in the midst of civil war, UEFA decided that they would not play in Belgrade. As a result, only one match was played, at Manchester United's Old Trafford ground. A further consequence of the political unrest was the dismantling of the Red Star team. The journalist Jonathon Aspey described their European Cup-winning team as one that "oozed class and represented to the West what Eastern football can be", but by the 1991–92 season, five of the starting line-up from the European Cup final had joined other clubs: midfield creator Robert Prosinečki, second striker Dragiša Binić, goalkeeper Stevan Stojanović, and defenders Refik Šabanadžović and Slobodan Marović. The game was originally scheduled to kick off at 20:00 GMT, but a week before the match, it was brought forward to 19:15. Manchester United went into the tie missing two of their regular players; club captain Bryan Robson was suspended, while Paul Parker was injured. The United manager, Alex Ferguson, also chose to rest Ryan Giggs. Ferguson came up with at least three different versions of the team line-up leading up to the match, as he tried to comply with UEFA's limitations on foreign players. He was eventually told that any foreign players signed before 3 May 1988 could play, and up to four non-English players signed since then. This change allowed him to add his Danish goalkeeper, Peter Schmeichel, back into the team, at the expense of 16-year-old English winger Ben Thornley.

For Manchester United, the Super Cup was their only chance to win a European trophy in the 1991–92 season; they had been knocked out of the Cup Winners' Cup in the second round earlier in the month, losing 4–1 on aggregate to Atlético Madrid, thus failing to retain their title. In contrast, Red Star were still in the European Cup, having won in each of the first two rounds. In the lead-up to the match, Ferguson said, "If we can defeat one of the best teams in Europe, it will be a real boost for us."

== Match ==
=== Summary ===
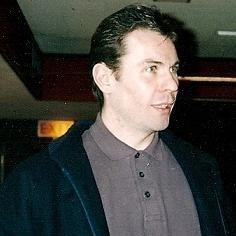
Brian McClair, pictured in 1992, scored the only goal of the game.

The match was played at Old Trafford, in front of a crowd of 22,110, roughly half the capacity of the ground, and Manchester United's lowest home attendance of the season. The Times' reporter at the game, Stuart Jones, explained that the match was played primarily for a television audience, and was more of a friendly match for the two sides. Manchester United had the first chance of the game in the second minute, when they were awarded a penalty by the referee, Mario van der Ende; a free kick from the right wing was hit to the far side of the penalty area by Lee Martin, where the ball was met by Gary Pallister, only for his header back across the box to be blocked by the arm of Red Star centre-back Miodrag Belodedici, who received a yellow card for handball. Manchester United captain Steve Bruce placed the penalty kick to the right of Red Star goalkeeper Zvonko Milojević, who palmed the ball round the post. United had another chance at goal four minutes later, when Milojević saved a shot from Mark Hughes. Manchester United's attacks in the first half were slow and laboured, rarely piercing Red Star's defence. Meanwhile, the Red Star forwards, Dejan Savićević and Darko Pančev, each broke through the United defence with quick, purposeful attacks. Pančev just missed the goal with a 20-yard volley, before heading wide from a free kick. Twice, attacks from Savićević and Pančev beat United's goalkeeper, Peter Schmeichel, but were cleared off the line by Gary Pallister and Clayton Blackmore. Another header from Pančev went narrowly wide just before half-time, and the score remained 0–0.

The travelling side continued to have the best of the play at the start of the second half: Savićević just missed the target with two angled shots. United, playing a counter-attacking game, started to have more success. In the 67th minute, Neil Webb dribbled the ball around Savićević on the edge of the box, and hit a shot that was deflected by Milojević onto the post. The ball rebounded to McClair, who put it into the net from close range, giving United a 1–0 lead. According to the Irish Independent, Manchester United played better after the goal, and had further chances to double their advantage; Blackmore hit a long-range shot that was parried by Milojević, while Giggs could only hit the goalkeeper with an effort and a volley from Hughes was saved near the ground by Milojević at his near post.

=== Details ===
19 November 1991
19:15 GMT

Manchester United (England)	1–0	(Socialist Federal Republic of Yugoslavia) Red Star Belgrade
McClair 67'	Report

Old Trafford, Manchester
Attendance: 22,110
Referee: Mario van der Ende (Netherlands)

Manchester United	Red Star Belgrade

GK	1	(Denmark) Peter Schmeichel
LB	2	(England) Lee Martin	(substituted off) 71'
RB	3	(Republic of Ireland) Denis Irwin
CB	4	(England) Steve Bruce (c)
CM	5	(England) Neil Webb
CB	6	(England) Gary Pallister
RM	7	(Soviet Union) Andrei Kanchelskis
CM	8	(England) Paul Ince
CF	9	(Scotland) Brian McClair
CF	10	(Wales) Mark Hughes
LM	11	(Wales) Clayton Blackmore
Substitutes:
DF	12	(Northern Ireland) Mal Donaghy
GK	13	(England) Gary Walsh
MF	14	(England) Russell Beardsmore
FW	15	(England) Mark Robins
MF	16	(Wales) Ryan Giggs	(substituted on) 71'
Manager:
(Scotland) Alex Ferguson

GK	1	(Socialist Federal Republic of Yugoslavia) Zvonko Milojević
RB	2	(Socialist Federal Republic of Yugoslavia) Duško Radinović
LB	3	(Socialist Federal Republic of Yugoslavia) Goran Vasilijević
CB	4	(Socialist Federal Republic of Yugoslavia) Miroslav Tanjga
SW	5	(Romania) Miodrag Belodedici	(yellow card) 2'
CB	6	(Socialist Federal Republic of Yugoslavia) Ilija Najdoski
RM	7	(Socialist Federal Republic of Yugoslavia) Vlada Stošić
CM	8	(Socialist Federal Republic of Yugoslavia) Vladimir Jugović
CF	9	(Socialist Federal Republic of Yugoslavia) Darko Pančev
LM	10	(Socialist Federal Republic of Yugoslavia) Dejan Savićević (c)		(substituted off) 82'
CM	11	(Socialist Federal Republic of Yugoslavia) Siniša Mihajlović
Substitutes:
GK	12	(Socialist Federal Republic of Yugoslavia) Dragoje Leković
DF	13	(Socialist Federal Republic of Yugoslavia) Saša Nedeljković
FW	14	(Socialist Federal Republic of Yugoslavia) Ilija Ivić		(substituted on) 82'
FW	15	(Socialist Federal Republic of Yugoslavia) Predrag Jovanović
Manager:
(Socialist Federal Republic of Yugoslavia) Vladica Popović

Assistant referees:
Cees Bakker (Netherlands)
Jef van Vliet (Netherlands)
Reserve referee:
Eddie Lomas (England)

Match rules

- 90 minutes
- 30 minutes of extra time if necessary
- Penalty shoot-out if scores still level after extra time
- Five named substitutes

== Aftermath ==
Both Manchester United and Red Star Belgrade earned an estimated £200,000 from the match, primarily from the television broadcast rights. Manchester United won their first and, as of 2024, only European Super Cup; they later lost the 1999, 2008 and 2017 Super Cups. Recalling the match later, Pančev said that although United had a good team, he felt that Red Star Belgrade were unlucky not to win. Ferguson, who was full of praise for the Red Star team, said: "They certainly have the talent and the imagination to do well and I think they are coming good at the right time." The Red Star Belgrade team continued to be dismantled; within two years, almost all of their European Cup-winning side had left the club. According to Aspey, "an era had ended before it had even begun." Red Star have not appeared in the European Super Cup since.

It would however be a month later in December, Red Star's team would stay together long enough to complete in the 1991 Intercontinental Cup, winning the match 3–0 over Colo-Colo of Chile and thus becoming official FIFA World Champions. This is their last non-domestic honour to date as of 2024 and only ever appearance in an Intercontinental competition.

== See also ==
- Manchester United F.C. in international football
- Red Star Belgrade in international football
- 1991–92 European Cup
- 1991–92 European Cup Winners' Cup
- 1991–92 Manchester United F.C. season
- 1991–92 Red Star Belgrade season
