= 1991 European Cup final =

- Match programme cover
- Event: 1990–91 European Cup
Red Star Belgrade	Marseille
(Socialist Federal Republic of Yugoslavia)	(France)
0	0
- After extra time Red Star Belgrade won 5–3 on penalties
- Date: 29 May 1991
- Venue: Stadio San Nicola, Bari
- Referee: Tullio Lanese (Italy)
- Attendance: 51,587

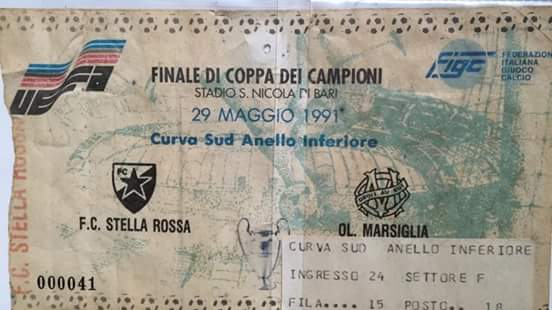
A ticket for the 1991 European Cup final

The 1991 European Cup final was a football match held at the Stadio San Nicola in Bari, Italy, on 29 May 1991, that saw Red Star Belgrade of Yugoslavia (Note: UEFA conventionally refers to Red Star Belgrade by the club's Serbian-language name, Crvena zvezda. Since the breakup of SFR Yugoslavia, the club competes under the auspices of its successor Serbian Football Association.) defeat Marseille of France in a penalty shoot-out. After normal time and extra time could not separate the two sides, the match was to be decided on penalty kicks. Manuel Amoros's miss for the French side proved crucial, as Red Star held their nerve to win their first European Cup title. As of 2026, this remains the last European Cup or UEFA Champions League final that both clubs were making their debut appearances in the competition's final.

== Teams ==
Team	Previous final appearances (bold indicates winners)
(Socialist Federal Republic of Yugoslavia) Red Star Belgrade	None
(France) Marseille	None

== Route to the final ==
(Socialist Federal Republic of Yugoslavia) Red Star Belgrade				Round	(France) Marseille			
Opponent	Agg.	1st leg	2nd leg		Opponent	Agg.	1st leg	2nd leg
(Switzerland) Grasshoppers	5–2	1–1 (H)	4–1 (A)	First round	(Albania) Dinamo Tirana	5–1	5–1 (H)	0–0 (A)
(Scotland) Rangers	4–1	3–0 (H)	1–1 (A)	Second round	(Poland) Lech Poznań	8–4	2–3 (A)	6–1 (H)
(East Germany) Dynamo Dresden	6–0	3–0 (H)	3–0 (A)	Quarter-finals	(Italy) AC Milan	4–1	1–1 (A)	3–0 (H)
(West Germany) Bayern Munich	4–3	2–1 (A)	2–2 (H)	Semi-finals	(Soviet Union) Spartak Moscow	5–2	3–1 (A)	2–1 (H)

== Pre-match ==
Red Star arrived in Italy unusually early, on Thursday, 23 May 1991, six full days ahead of the final. The team set up base in the town of Monopoli, 40 kilometres (25 mi) south-east of Bari. There they stayed in Il Melograno Hotel, an isolated accommodation on the town outskirts, and trained at the facilities of AC Monopoli. Due to a lot of interest from richer European clubs already being raised for the future services of young Red Star players, the club management tried to ensure its footballers were fully focused on the task at hand. The players were placed in semi-quarantine immediately upon arrival in Italy, which meant being separated from their families without the ability to receive incoming phone calls in hotel rooms, though able to make outgoing calls.

Over the coming days, the club also organized for a large entourage consisting of club legends, friends of the club, etc., to arrive in Bari in order to watch Red Star in its first European Cup final. Therefore, notable former players Rajko Mitić, Dragoslav Šekularac, Srđan Mrkušić, Stanislav Karasi, and Živorad Jevtić, former coach Miša Pavić, and several Serbian celebrities and personalities such as Ljuba Tadić, Ivan Bekjarev, and Bora Đorđević, all made their way to Italy.

== Match details ==
29 May 1991
20:15 CEST

Red Star Belgrade (Socialist Federal Republic of Yugoslavia)	0–0 (a.e.t.)	(France) Marseille
	Report
Penalties
Prosinečki (penalty scored); Binić (penalty scored); Belodedici (penalty scored); Mihajlović (penalty scored); Pančev (penalty scored)	5–3	(penalty missed) Amoros; (penalty scored) Casoni; (penalty scored) Papin; (penalty scored) Mozer

Stadio San Nicola, Bari
Attendance: 51,587
Referee: Tullio Lanese (Italy)

**Red Star Belgrade**	**Marseille**

GK	1	(Socialist Federal Republic of Yugoslavia) Stevan Stojanović (c)
RB	4	(Socialist Federal Republic of Yugoslavia) Refik Šabanadžović
CB	6	(Socialist Federal Republic of Yugoslavia) Ilija Najdoski
CB	8	(Socialist Federal Republic of Yugoslavia) Siniša Mihajlović	(yellow card) 40'
LB	3	(Socialist Federal Republic of Yugoslavia) Slobodan Marović	(yellow card) 61'
DM	5	(Romania) Miodrag Belodedici
RM	11	(Socialist Federal Republic of Yugoslavia) Dragiša Binić	(yellow card) 26'
CM	7	(Socialist Federal Republic of Yugoslavia) Robert Prosinečki
CM	10	(Socialist Federal Republic of Yugoslavia) Dejan Savićević		(substituted off) 84'
LM	2	(Socialist Federal Republic of Yugoslavia) Vladimir Jugović
CF	9	(Socialist Federal Republic of Yugoslavia) Darko Pančev
Substitutes:
GK	12	(Socialist Federal Republic of Yugoslavia) Milić Jovanović
MF	13	(Socialist Federal Republic of Yugoslavia) Ivica Momčilović
DF	14	(Socialist Federal Republic of Yugoslavia) Rade Tošić
MF	15	(Socialist Federal Republic of Yugoslavia) Vlada Stošić		(substituted on) 84'
FW	16	(Socialist Federal Republic of Yugoslavia) Vladan Lukić
Manager:
(Socialist Federal Republic of Yugoslavia) Ljupko Petrović

GK	1	(France) Pascal Olmeta
CB	4	(France) Basile Boli	(yellow card) 28'
CB	5	(Brazil) Carlos Mozer
CB	7	(France) Bernard Casoni
RM	2	(France) Manuel Amoros
CM	11	(France) Laurent Fournier		(substituted off) 75'
CM	6	(France) Bruno Germain
LM	3	(France) Éric Di Meco		(substituted off) 112'
RF	8	(England) Chris Waddle
CF	9	(France) Jean-Pierre Papin (c)
LF	10	(Ghana) Abedi Pele
Substitutes:
MF	12	(Socialist Federal Republic of Yugoslavia) Dragan Stojković		(substituted on) 112'
MF	13	(France) Philippe Vercruysse		(substituted on) 75'
MF	14	(France) Jean Tigana
DF	15	(France) Éric Mura
GK	16	(France) Alain Casanova
Manager:
(Belgium) Raymond Goethals

Assistant referees:
Castello Buonocore (Italy)
Roberto Calabassi (Italy)
Fourth official:
Pierluigi Magni (Italy)

**Match rules**

- 90 minutes
- 30 minutes of extra time if necessary
- Penalty shoot-out if scores still level
- Five named substitutes, of which two may be used

== See also ==
- 1990–91 Red Star Belgrade season
- 1990–91 Olympique de Marseille season
- 1991 European Cup Winners' Cup final
- 1991 European Super Cup
- 1991 UEFA Cup final
- Red Star Belgrade in European football
- Olympique de Marseille in European football
