= Red Star Belgrade in international football =

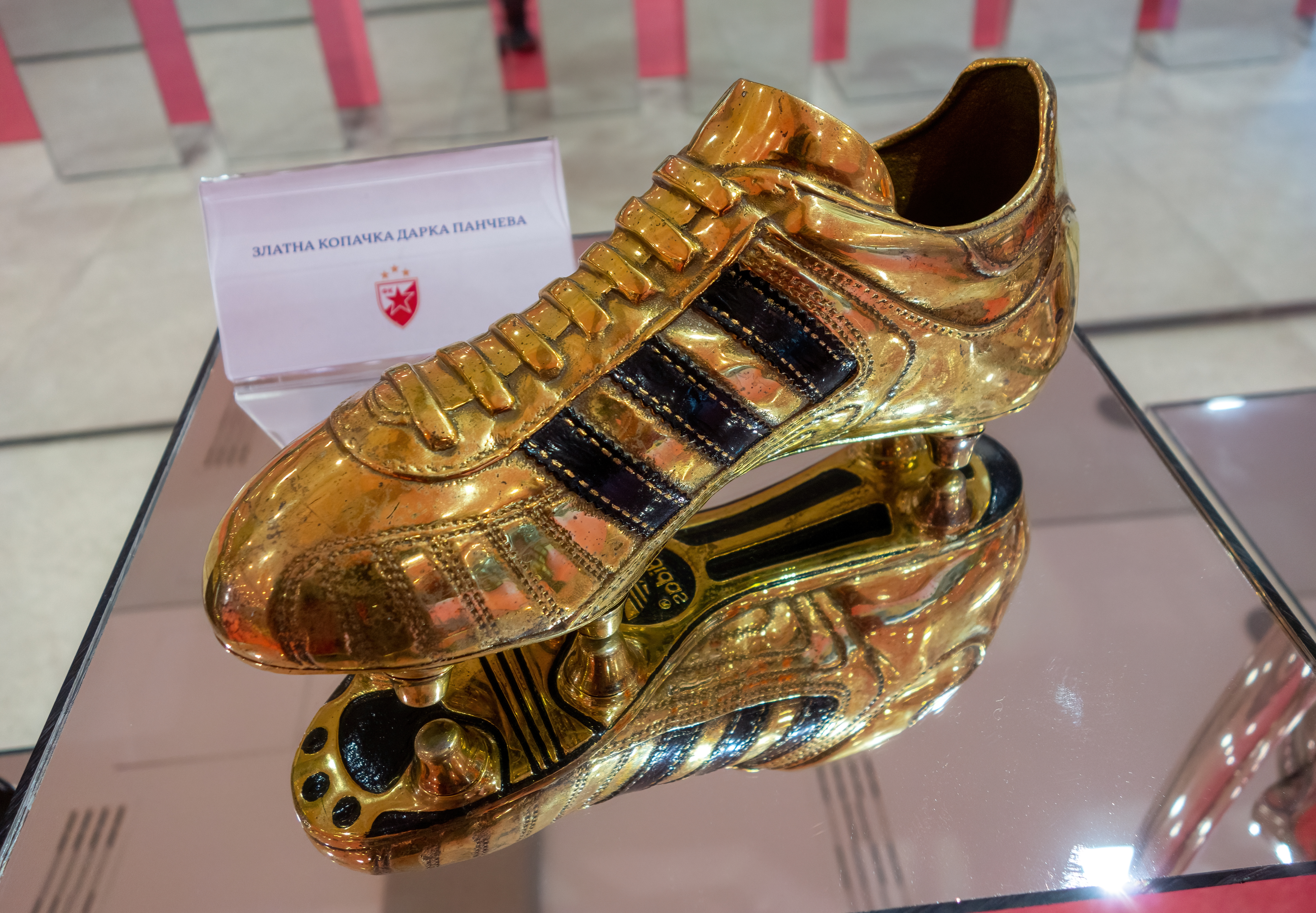
- European Golden Shoe awarded to Darko Pančev
- Club: Red Star Belgrade
- Seasons played: 64
- First entry: 1956–57 European Cup
- Latest entry: 2026–27 UEFA Conference League

Titles
- Champions League: 1 (1991)
- Intercontinental Cup: 1 (1991)

List of Red Star Belgrade's official international matches from 1956–57 season until today.

== A brief history ==
Red Star's European story began in 1956–57 season with match in Kerkrade, Netherlands. The first rival in the first round of the 1956–57 European Cup were Dutch champions Rapid JC (the club later changed its name to Roda JC), with Bora Kostić scoring Red Star's first ever European goal. Since the first European Cup semi-final, when Red Star was eliminated by Fiorentina, Red Star participated 14 times in a European competition quarter-final (not counting the Mitropa Cup), and was a semi-finalist in each of the three UEFA competitions for a total of six appearances. Throughout this time, Red Star steadily kept its place among the top 15 European clubs on UEFA's ranking list, situated just behind Real Madrid and Barcelona for the number of season participations in European Cups. In 1991, Red Star finally won the 1991 European Cup, in a game against Marseille.

From 1992 to 1995, the clubs from FR Yugoslavia were forbidden to take part in the European competitions, due to the sanctions against Yugoslavia. For two decades after 1995, Red Star has only made two group stage appearances of the second-tier competition UEFA Cup, in 2005–06 and 2007–08.

In 2017–18 UEFA Europa League, Red Star made another group stage appearance and even advanced to the "Round of 32" where it lost to CSKA Moscow. After 26 years of absence from the top-tier European competition, Red Star made group stage appearance of the 2018–19 UEFA Champions League. For the second consecutive season, Red Star qualified for the 2019–20 UEFA Champions League group stage.

== Club all-time European record ==
Red Star Belgrade	Seasons	Pld	W	D	L	GF	GA	W %
Representing Serbia	20	166	61	42	63	230	229	36.75
Representing Serbia and Montenegro	11	66	26	20	20	109	80	39.39
Representing (Socialist Federal Republic of Yugoslavia) Yugoslavia	33	179	89	30	60	347	235	49.72
Total	64	411	176	92	143	686	544	42.82

Competition	Pld	W	D	L
European Cup / UEFA Champions League	177	78	36	63
UEFA Cup / UEFA Europa League	177	76	44	57
UEFA Conference League	0	0	0	0
UEFA Cup Winners' Cup	34	12	10	12
Inter-Cities Fairs Cup	21	9	2	10
UEFA Super Cup	1	0	0	1
Intercontinental Cup	1	1	0	0
Total	411	176	92	143

As of 27 August 2026

=== UEFA Ranking ===
As of 27 August 2026

Rank	Team	Points
59	(Czech Republic) Sparta Prague	36.250
59	(Azerbaijan) Qarabağ	36.250
61	(Slovakia) Slovan Bratislava	36.000
62	(Serbia) Red Star Belgrade	34.000
63	(Germany) VfB Stuttgart	33.500
64	(Sweden) Djurgården	32.000
65	(Greece) Panathinaikos	31.750

== Best results in international competitions ==
Season	Achievement	Notes
European Cup / UEFA Champions League
1990–91	Winners	defeated (France) Marseille 0–0 in Bari, 5–3 pen.
1956–57	Semi-finals	lost to (Italy) Fiorentina 0–1 in Belgrade, 0–0 in Firenze
1970–71	Semi-finals	lost to (Greece) Panathinaikos 4–1 in Belgrade, 0–3 in Athens
1991–92	Semi-finals	finished second in a group with (Italy) Sampdoria, (Belgium) Anderlecht and (Greece) Panathinaikos
1957–58	Quarter-finals	lost to (England) Manchester United 1–2 in Manchester, 3–3 in Belgrade
1973–74	Quarter-finals	lost to (Spain) Atlético Madrid 0–2 in Belgrade, 0–0 in Madrid
1980–81	Quarter-finals	lost to (Italy) Internazionale 1–1 in Milan, 0–1 in Belgrade
1981–82	Quarter-finals	lost to (Belgium) Anderlecht 1–2 in Brussels, 1–2 in Belgrade
1986–87	Quarter-finals	lost to (Spain) Real Madrid 4–2 in Belgrade, 0–2 in Madrid
UEFA Cup / UEFA Europa League
1978–79	Runners-up	lost to (West Germany) Borussia Mönchengladbach 1–1 in Belgrade, 0–1 in Düsseldorf
UEFA Cup Winners' Cup
1974–75	Semi-finals	lost to (Hungary) Ferencváros 1–2 in Budapest, 2–2 in Belgrade
1971–72	Quarter-finals	lost to (Soviet Union) Dynamo Moscow 1–2 in Belgrade, 1–1 in Moscow
1985–86	Quarter-finals	lost to (Spain) Atlético Madrid 0–2 in Belgrade, 1–1 in Madrid
UEFA Super Cup
1991	Runners-up	lost to (England) Manchester United 0–1 in Manchester
Intercontinental Cup
1991	Winners	defeated (Chile) Colo-Colo 3–0 in Tokyo
Inter-Cities Fairs Cup
1961–62	Semi-finals	lost to (Spain) Barcelona 0–2 in Belgrade, 1–4 in Barcelona
1962–63	Quarter-finals	lost to (Italy) Roma 0–3 in Rome, 2–0 in Belgrade
Mitropa Cup
1958	Winners	defeated (Czechoslovakia) Rudá Hvězda Brno 4–1 in Belgrade, 3–2 in Brno
1967–68	Winners	defeated (Czechoslovakia) Spartak Trnava 0–1 in Trnava, 4–1 in Belgrade
1957	Semi-finals	lost to (Hungary) Vasas 1–3 in Budapest, 2–3 in Belgrade

Biggest win in UEFA competition:

Season	Match	Score
European Cup / UEFA Champions League
1957–58	Red Star – Stade Dudelange	9–1
1969–70	Red Star – Linfield	8–0

== List of matches ==
Note: Red Star score always listed first.

=== 1956–70 ===
Season	Competition	Round	Country	Opponent	Home	Away	Aggregate
1956–57	European Cup	R1	(Netherlands)	Rapid JC Kerkrade	2–0	4–3	6–3
1956–57	European Cup	Quarter final	(Bulgaria)	CSKA Sofia	3–1	1–2	4–3
1956–57	European Cup	Semi final	(Italy)	Fiorentina	0–1	0–0	0–1
1957–58	European Cup	QR	(Luxembourg)	Stade Dudelange	9–1	5–0	14–1
1957–58	European Cup	R1	(Sweden)	Norrköping	2–1	2–2	4–3
1957–58	European Cup	Quarter final	(England)	Manchester United	3–3	1–2	4–5
1959–60	European Cup	R1	(England)	Wolverhampton Wanderers	1–1	0–3	1–4
1960–61	European Cup	R1	(Hungary)	Újpest	1–2	0–3	1–5
1961–62	Inter-Cities Fairs Cup	R1	(Switzerland)	Basel	4–1	1–1	5–2
1961–62	Inter-Cities Fairs Cup	R2	(Scotland)	Hibernian	4–0	1–0	5–0
1961–62	Inter-Cities Fairs Cup	Quarter final	(Spain)	Espanyol	5–0	1–2	6–2
1961–62	Inter-Cities Fairs Cup	Semi final	(Spain)	Barcelona	0–2	1–4	1–6
1962–63	Inter-Cities Fairs Cup	R1	(Austria)	Rapid Wien	1–0	1–1	2–1
1962–63	Inter-Cities Fairs Cup	R2	(Spain)	Barcelona	3–2	0–1	3–3 (1–0 play-off)
1962–63	Inter-Cities Fairs Cup	Quarter final	(Italy)	Roma	2–0	0–3	2–3
1964–65	European Cup	R1	(Scotland)	Rangers	4–2	1–3	5–5 (1–3 play-off)
1965–66	Inter-Cities Fairs Cup	R1	(Italy)	Fiorentina	0–4	1–3	1–7
1966–67	Inter-Cities Fairs Cup	R1	(Spain)	Athletic Bilbao	5–0	0–2	5–2
1966–67	Inter-Cities Fairs Cup	R2	(Spain)	Valencia	1–2	0–1	1–3
1968–69	European Cup	R2	(Scotland)	Celtic	1–1	1–5	2–6
1969–70	European Cup	R1	(Northern Ireland)	Linfield	8–0	4–2	12–2
1969–70	European Cup	R2	(East Germany)	Vorwärts Berlin	3–2	1–2	4–4 (a)

=== 1970–80 ===
Season	Competition	Round	Country	Opponent	Home	Away	Aggregate
1970–71	European Cup	R1	(Hungary)	Újpest	4–0	0–2	4–2
1970–71	European Cup	R2	(Romania)	UTA Arad	3–0	3–1	6–1
1970–71	European Cup	Quarter final	(East Germany)	Carl Zeiss Jena	4–0	2–3	6–3
1970–71	European Cup	Semi final	(Greece)	Panathinaikos	4–1	0–3	4–4 (a)
1971–72	Cup Winners' Cup	R1	(Hungary)	Komló Bányász	1–2	7–2	8–4
1971–72	Cup Winners' Cup	R2	(Netherlands)	Sparta Rotterdam	2–1	1–1	3–2
1971–72	Cup Winners' Cup	Quarter final	(Soviet Union)	Dynamo Moscow	1–2	1–1	2–3
1972–73	UEFA Cup	R1	(Switzerland)	Lausanne-Sport	5–1	2–3	7–4
1972–73	UEFA Cup	R2	(Spain)	Valencia	3–1	1–0	4–1
1972–73	UEFA Cup	R3	(England)	Tottenham Hotspur	1–0	0–2	1–2
1973–74	European Cup	R1	(Poland)	Stal Mielec	2–1	1–0	3–1
1973–74	European Cup	R2	(England)	Liverpool	2–1	2–1	4–2
1973–74	European Cup	Quarter final	(Spain)	Atlético Madrid	0–2	0–0	0–2
1974–75	Cup Winners' Cup	R1	(Greece)	PAOK	2–0	0–1	2–1
1974–75	Cup Winners' Cup	R2	(Luxembourg)	Avenir Beggen	5–1	6–1	11–2
1974–75	Cup Winners' Cup	Quarter final	(Spain)	Real Madrid	2–0	0–2	2–2 (6–5 p)
1974–75	Cup Winners' Cup	Semi final	(Hungary)	Ferencváros	2–2	1–2	3–4
1975–76	UEFA Cup	R1	(Romania)	Universitatea Craiova	1–1	3–1	4–2
1975–76	UEFA Cup	R2	(West Germany)	Hamburger SV	1–1	0–4	1–5
1976–77	UEFA Cup	R1	(Bulgaria)	Lokomotiv Plovdiv	4–1	1–2	5–3
1976–77	UEFA Cup	R2	(Austria)	Austria Salzburg	1–0	1–2	2–2 (a)
1976–77	UEFA Cup	R3	(Greece)	AEK Athens	3–1	0–2	3–3 (a)
1977–78	European Cup	R1	(Republic of Ireland)	Sligo Rovers	3–0	3–0	6–0
1977–78	European Cup	R2	(West Germany)	Borussia Mönchengladbach	0–3	1–5	1–8
1978–79	UEFA Cup	R1	(East Germany)	Berliner FC Dynamo	4–1	2–5	6–6 (a)
1978–79	UEFA Cup	R2	(Spain)	Sporting Gijón	1–1	1–0	2–1
1978–79	UEFA Cup	R3	(England)	Arsenal	1–0	1–1	2–1
1978–79	UEFA Cup	Quarter final	(England)	West Bromwich Albion	1–0	1–1	2–1
1978–79	UEFA Cup	Semi final	(West Germany)	Hertha BSC	1–0	1–2	2–2 (a)
1978–79	UEFA Cup	Final	(West Germany)	Borussia Mönchengladbach	1–1	0–1	1–2
1979–80	UEFA Cup	R1	(Turkey)	Galatasaray	3–1	0–0	3–1
1979–80	UEFA Cup	R2	(East Germany)	Carl Zeiss Jena	3–2	3–2	6–4
1979–80	UEFA Cup	R3	(West Germany)	Bayern Munich	3–2	0–2	3–4

=== 1980–90 ===
Season	Competition	Round	Country	Opponent	Home	Away	Aggregate
1980–81	European Cup	R1	(Norway)	Viking	4–1	3–2	7–3
1980–81	European Cup	R2	(Switzerland)	Basel	2–0	0–1	2–1
1980–81	European Cup	Quarter final	(Italy)	Inter Milan	0–1	1–1	1–2
1981–82	European Cup	R1	(Malta)	Hibernians Paola	8–1	2–1	10–2
1981–82	European Cup	R2	(Czechoslovakia)	Baník Ostrava	3–0	1–3	4–3
1981–82	European Cup	Quarter final	(Belgium)	Anderlecht	1–2	1–2	2–4
1982–83	Cup Winners' Cup	R1	(Norway)	Lillestrøm	3–0	4–0	7–0
1982–83	Cup Winners' Cup	R2	(Spain)	Barcelona	2–4	1–2	3–6
1983–84	UEFA Cup	R1	(Italy)	Hellas Verona	2–3	0–1	2–4
1984–85	European Cup	R1	(Portugal)	Benfica	3–2	0–2	3–4
1985–86	Cup Winners' Cup	R1	(Switzerland)	Aarau	2–0	2–2	4–2
1985–86	Cup Winners' Cup	R2	(Denmark)	Lyngby	3–1	2–2	5–3
1985–86	Cup Winners' Cup	Quarter final	(Spain)	Atlético Madrid	0–2	1–1	1–3
1986–87	European Cup	R1	(Greece)	Panathinaikos	3–0	1–2	4–2
1986–87	European Cup	R2	(Norway)	Rosenborg	4–1	3–0	7–1
1986–87	European Cup	Quarter final	(Spain)	Real Madrid	4–2	0–2	4–4 (a)
1987–88	UEFA Cup	R1	(Bulgaria)	Trakia Plovdiv	3–0	2–2	5–2
1987–88	UEFA Cup	R2	(Belgium)	Club Brugge	3–1	0–4	3–5
1988–89	European Cup	R1	(Republic of Ireland)	Dundalk	3–0	5–0	8–0
1988–89	European Cup	R2	(Italy)	Milan	1–1	1–1	2–2 (2–4 p)
1989–90	UEFA Cup	R1	(Turkey)	Galatasaray	2–0	1–1	3–1
1989–90	UEFA Cup	R2	(Soviet Union)	Žalgiris	4–1	1–0	5–1
1989–90	UEFA Cup	R3	(West Germany)	1. FC Köln	2–0	0–3	2–3

=== 1990–2000 ===
Season	Competition	Round	Country	Opponent	Home	Away	Aggregate
1990–91	European Cup	R1	(Switzerland)	Grasshopper	1–1	4–1	5–2
1990–91	European Cup	R2	(Scotland)	Rangers	3–0	1–1	4–1
1990–91	European Cup	Quarter final	(East Germany)	Dynamo Dresden	3–0	3–0	6–0
1990–91	European Cup	Semi final	(West Germany)	Bayern Munich	2–2	2–1	4–3
1990–91	European Cup	Final	(France)	Marseille	0–0 (5–3 p)		
1991	European Super Cup	Final	(England)	Manchester United	—N/a	0–1	—N/a
1991	Intercontinental Cup	Final	(Chile)	Colo-Colo	3–0		
1991–92	European Cup	R1	(Northern Ireland)	Portadown	4–0	4–0	8–0
1991–92	European Cup	R2	(Cyprus)	Apollon Limassol	3–1	2–0	5–1
1991–92	European Cup	Group A	(Belgium)	Anderlecht	3–2	2–3	2nd out of 4
1991–92	European Cup	Group A	(Italy)	Sampdoria	1–3	0–2	2nd out of 4
1991–92	European Cup	Group A	(Greece)	Panathinaikos	1–0	2–0	2nd out of 4
1995–96	UEFA Cup	QR	(Switzerland)	Neuchâtel Xamax	0–1	0–0	0–1
1996–97	Cup Winners' Cup	QR	(Scotland)	Heart of Midlothian	0–0	1–1	1–1 (a)
1996–97	Cup Winners' Cup	R1	(Germany)	1. FC Kaiserslautern	4–0	0–1	4–1
1996–97	Cup Winners' Cup	R2	(Spain)	Barcelona	1–1	1–3	2–4
1997–98	Cup Winners' Cup	QR	(Finland)	HJK	3–0	0–1	3–1
1997–98	Cup Winners' Cup	R1	(Belgium)	Germinal Ekeren	1–1	2–3	3–4
1998–99	UEFA Cup	QR1	(Georgia (country))	Kolkheti-1913 Poti	7–0	4–0	11–0
1998–99	UEFA Cup	QR2	(Russia)	Rotor Volgograd	2–1	2–1	4–2
1998–99	UEFA Cup	R1	(France)	Metz	2–1	1–2	3–3 (4–3 p)
1998–99	UEFA Cup	R2	(France)	Lyon	1–2	2–3	3–5
1999–2000	UEFA Cup	QR	(Azerbaijan)	Neftçi Baku	1–0	3–2	4–2
1999–2000	UEFA Cup	R1	(France)	Montpellier	0–1	2–2	2–3

=== 2000–10 ===
Season	Competition	Round	Country	Opponent	Home	Away	Aggregate
2000–01	Champions League	QR1	(Faroe Islands)	KÍ Klaksvík	2–0	3–0	5–0
2000–01	Champions League	QR2	(Georgia (country))	Torpedo Kutaisi	4–0	0–2	4–2
2000–01	Champions League	QR3	(Ukraine)	Dynamo Kyiv	1–1	0–0	1–1 (a)
2000–01	UEFA Cup	R1	(England)	Leicester City	3–1	1–1	4–2
2000–01	UEFA Cup	R2	(Spain)	Celta Vigo	1–0	3–5	4–5
2001–02	Champions League	QR2	(Cyprus)	Omonia Nicosia	2–1	1–1	3–2
2001–02	Champions League	QR3	(Germany)	Bayer Leverkusen	0–0	0–3	0–3
2001–02	UEFA Cup	R1	(Ukraine)	Arsenal Kyiv	0–0	2–3	2–3
2002–03	UEFA Cup	QR	(Kazakhstan)	Kairat	3–0	2–0	5–0
2002–03	UEFA Cup	R1	(Italy)	Chievo Verona	0–0	2–0	2–0
2002–03	UEFA Cup	R2	(Italy)	Lazio	1–1	0–1	1–2
2003–04	UEFA Cup	QR	(Moldova)	Nistru Otaci	5–0	3–2	8–2
2003–04	UEFA Cup	R1	(Denmark)	Odense	4–3	2–2	6–5
2003–04	UEFA Cup	R2	(Norway)	Rosenborg	0–1	0–0	0–1
2004–05	Champions League	QR2	(Switzerland)	Young Boys	3–0	2–2	5–2
2004–05	Champions League	QR3	(Netherlands)	PSV Eindhoven	3–2	0–5	3–7
2004–05	UEFA Cup	R1	(Russia)	Zenit Saint Petersburg	1–2	0–4	1–6
2005–06	UEFA Cup	QR2	(Croatia)	Inter Zaprešić	4–0	3–1	7–1
2005–06	UEFA Cup	R1	(Portugal)	Braga	0–0	1–1	1–1 (a)
2005–06	UEFA Cup	Group E	(Switzerland)	Basel	1–2		4th out of 5
2005–06	UEFA Cup	Group E	(Norway)	Tromsø		1–3	4th out of 5
2005–06	UEFA Cup	Group E	(Italy)	Roma	3–1		4th out of 5
2005–06	UEFA Cup	Group E	(France)	Strasbourg		2–2	4th out of 5
2006–07	Champions League	QR2	(Republic of Ireland)	Cork City	3–0	1–0	4–0
2006–07	Champions League	QR3	(Italy)	Milan	1–2	0–1	1–3
2006–07	UEFA Cup	R1	(Czech Republic)	Slovan Liberec	1–2	0–2	1–4
2007–08	Champions League	QR2	(Estonia)	Levadia Tallinn	1–0	1–2	2–2 (a)
2007–08	Champions League	QR3	(Scotland)	Rangers	0–0	0–1	0–1
2007–08	UEFA Cup	R1	(Poland)	Groclin Grodzisk	1–0	1–0	2–0
2007–08	UEFA Cup	Group F	(Germany)	Bayern Munich	2–3		5th out of 5
2007–08	UEFA Cup	Group F	(Greece)	Aris Thessaloniki		0–3	5th out of 5
2007–08	UEFA Cup	Group F	(England)	Bolton Wanderers	0–1		5th out of 5
2007–08	UEFA Cup	Group F	(Portugal)	Braga		0–2	5th out of 5
2008–09	UEFA Cup	QR2	(Cyprus)	APOEL	3–3	2–2	5–5 (a)
2009–10	Europa League	QR2	(Slovenia)	Rudar Velenje	4–0	1–0	5–0
2009–10	Europa League	QR3	(Georgia (country))	Dinamo Tbilisi	5–2	0–2	5–4
2009–10	Europa League	Play off	(Czech Republic)	Slavia Prague	2–1	0–3	2–4

=== 2010–20 ===
Season	Competition	Round	Country	Opponent	Home	Away	Aggregate
2010–11	Europa League	QR3	(Slovakia)	Slovan Bratislava	1–2	1–1	2–3
2011–12	Europa League	QR3	(Latvia)	Ventspils	7–0	2–1	9–1
2011–12	Europa League	Play off	(France)	Rennes	1–2	0–4	1–6
2012–13	Europa League	QR2	(Belarus)	Naftan Novopolotsk	3–3	4–3	7–6
2012–13	Europa League	QR3	(Cyprus)	Omonia	0–0	0–0	0–0 (6–5 p)
2012–13	Europa League	Play off	(France)	Bordeaux	0–0	2–3	2–3
2013–14	Europa League	QR2	(Iceland)	ÍB Vestmannaeyja	2–0	0–0	2–0
2013–14	Europa League	QR3	(Ukraine)	Chornomorets Odesa	0–0	1–3	1–3
2015–16	Europa League	QR1	(Kazakhstan)	Kairat	0–2	1–2	1–4
2016–17	Champions League	QR2	(Malta)	Valletta	2–1	2–1	4–2
2016–17	Champions League	QR3	(Bulgaria)	Ludogorets Razgrad	2–4	2–2	4–6
2016–17	Europa League	Play off	(Italy)	Sassuolo	1–1	0–3	1–4
2017–18	Europa League	QR1	(Malta)	Floriana	3–0	3–3	6–3
2017–18	Europa League	QR2	(Kazakhstan)	Irtysh Pavlodar	2–0	1–1	3–1
2017–18	Europa League	QR3	(Czech Republic)	Sparta Prague	2–0	1–0	3–0
2017–18	Europa League	Play off	(Russia)	Krasnodar	2–1	2–3	4–4 (a)
2017–18	Europa League	Group H	(England)	Arsenal	0–1	0–0	2nd out of 4
2017–18	Europa League	Group H	(Belarus)	BATE Borisov	1–1	0–0	2nd out of 4
2017–18	Europa League	Group H	(Germany)	1. FC Köln	1–0	1–0	2nd out of 4
2017–18	Europa League	Round of 32	(Russia)	CSKA Moscow	0–0	0–1	0–1
2018–19	Champions League	QR1	(Latvia)	Spartaks Jūrmala	2–0	0–0	2–0
2018–19	Champions League	QR2	(Lithuania)	Sūduva Marijampolė	3–0	2–0	5–0
2018–19	Champions League	QR3	(Slovakia)	Spartak Trnava	1–1	2–1	3–2
2018–19	Champions League	Play off	(Austria)	Red Bull Salzburg	0–0	2–2	2–2 (a)
2018–19	Champions League	Group C	(France)	Paris Saint-Germain	1–4	1–6	4th out of 4
2018–19	Champions League	Group C	(England)	Liverpool	2–0	0–4	4th out of 4
2018–19	Champions League	Group C	(Italy)	Napoli	0–0	1–3	4th out of 4
2019–20	Champions League	QR1	(Lithuania)	Sūduva Marijampolė	2–1	0–0	2–1
2019–20	Champions League	QR2	(Finland)	HJK	2–0	1–2	3–2
2019–20	Champions League	QR3	(Denmark)	Copenhagen	1–1	1–1	2–2 (7–6 p)
2019–20	Champions League	Play off	(Switzerland)	Young Boys	1–1	2–2	3–3 (a)
2019–20	Champions League	Group B	(Germany)	Bayern Munich	0–6	0–3	4th out of 4
2019–20	Champions League	Group B	(England)	Tottenham Hotspur	0–4	0–5	4th out of 4
2019–20	Champions League	Group B	(Greece)	Olympiacos	3–1	0–1	4th out of 4

=== 2020–present ===
Season	Competition	Round	Country	Opponent	Home	Away	Aggregate
2020–21	Champions League	QR1	(Gibraltar)	Europa	5–0	—N/a	5–0
2020–21	Champions League	QR2	(Albania)	Tirana	—N/a	1–0	1–0
2020–21	Champions League	QR3	(Cyprus)	Omonia	—N/a	1–1	1–1 (2–4 p)
2020–21	Europa League	Play off	(Armenia)	Ararat-Armenia	—N/a	2–1	2–1
2020–21	Europa League	Group L	(Belgium)	Gent	2–1	2–0	2nd out of 4
2020–21	Europa League	Group L	(Germany)	TSG Hoffenheim	0–0	0–2	2nd out of 4
2020–21	Europa League	Group L	(Czech Republic)	Slovan Liberec	5–1	0–0	2nd out of 4
2020–21	Europa League	Round of 32	(Italy)	Milan	2–2	1–1	3–3 (a)
2021–22	Champions League	QR2	(Kazakhstan)	Kairat	5–0	1–2	6–2
2021–22	Champions League	QR3	(Moldova)	Sheriff Tiraspol	1–1	0–1	1–2
2021–22	Europa League	Play off	(Romania)	CFR Cluj	4–0	2–1	6–1
2021–22	Europa League	Group F	(Portugal)	Braga	2–1	1–1	1st out of 4
2021–22	Europa League	Group F	(Bulgaria)	Ludogorets Razgrad	1–0	1–0	1st out of 4
2021–22	Europa League	Group F	(Denmark)	Midtjylland	0–1	1–1	1st out of 4
2021–22	Europa League	Knockout round play-offs	Bye				
2021–22	Europa League	Round of 16	(Scotland)	Rangers	2–1	0–3	2–4
2022–23	Champions League	QR3	(Armenia)	Pyunik	5–0	2–0	7–0
2022–23	Champions League	Play off	(Israel)	Maccabi Haifa	2–2	2–3	4–5
2022–23	Europa League	Group H	(France)	Monaco	0–1	1–4	4th out of 4
2022–23	Europa League	Group H	(Hungary)	Ferencváros	4–1	1–2	4th out of 4
2022–23	Europa League	Group H	(Turkey)	Trabzonspor	2–1	1–2	4th out of 4
2023–24	Champions League	Group G	(England)	Manchester City	2–3	1–3	4th out of 4
2023–24	Champions League	Group G	(Germany)	RB Leipzig	1–2	1–3	4th out of 4
2023–24	Champions League	Group G	(Switzerland)	Young Boys	2–2	0–2	4th out of 4
2024–25	Champions League	Play off	(Norway)	Bodø/Glimt	2–0	1–2	3–2
2024–25	Champions League	League phase	(Portugal)	Benfica	1–2	—N/a	29th out of 36
2024–25	Champions League	League phase	(Italy)	Inter Milan	—N/a	0–4	29th out of 36
2024–25	Champions League	League phase	(France)	Monaco	—N/a	1–5	29th out of 36
2024–25	Champions League	League phase	(Spain)	Barcelona	2–5	—N/a	29th out of 36
2024–25	Champions League	League phase	(Germany)	VfB Stuttgart	5–1	—N/a	29th out of 36
2024–25	Champions League	League phase	(Italy)	Milan	—N/a	1–2	29th out of 36
2024–25	Champions League	League phase	(Netherlands)	PSV Eindhoven	2–3	—N/a	29th out of 36
2024–25	Champions League	League phase	(Switzerland)	Young Boys	—N/a	1–0	29th out of 36
2025–26	Champions League	QR2	(Gibraltar)	Lincoln Red Imps	5–1	1–0	6–1
2025–26	Champions League	QR3	(Poland)	Lech Poznań	1–1	3–1	4–2
2025–26	Champions League	Play off	(Cyprus)	Pafos	1–2	1–1	2–3
2025–26	Europa League	League phase	(Scotland)	Celtic	1–1	—N/a	15th out of 36
2025–26	Europa League	League phase	(Portugal)	Porto	—N/a	1–2	15th out of 36
2025–26	Europa League	League phase	(Portugal)	Braga	—N/a	0–2	15th out of 36
2025–26	Europa League	League phase	(France)	Lille	1–0	—N/a	15th out of 36
2025–26	Europa League	League phase	(Romania)	FCSB	1–0	—N/a	15th out of 36
2025–26	Europa League	League phase	(Austria)	Sturm Graz	—N/a	1–0	15th out of 36
2025–26	Europa League	League phase	(Sweden)	Malmö FF	—N/a	1–0	15th out of 36
2025–26	Europa League	League phase	(Spain)	Celta Vigo	1–1	—N/a	15th out of 36
2025–26	Europa League	Knockout phase play-offs	(France)	Lille	0–2	1–0	1–2
2026–27	Champions League	QR2	(Northern Ireland)	Larne	5–0	4–0	9–0
2026–27	Champions League	QR3	(Israel)	Hapoel Be'er Sheva	0–2	0–1	0–3
2026–27	Europa League	Play off	(Czech Republic)	Viktoria Plzeň	3–0	1–5	4–5
2026–27	Conference League	League phase	(Switzerland)	Lugano	—N/a	2–3	TBD
2026–27	Conference League	League phase	(Denmark)	Copenhagen	2–2	—N/a	TBD
2026–27	Conference League	League phase	(Andorra)	Inter Club d'Escaldes	2–1	—N/a	TBD
2026–27	Conference League	League phase	(Belgium)	Gent	—N/a		TBD
2026–27	Conference League	League phase	(Georgia (country))	Iberia 1999	—N/a		TBD
2026–27	Conference League	League phase	(Turkey)	Trabzonspor		—N/a	TBD

== Overall record by country ==
As of 27th of August 2026

Red Star Belgrade record in international football by country
Opponents	Pld	W	D	L	GF	GA	GD
Albania	1	1	0	0	1	0	+1
Armenia	3	3	0	0	9	1	+8
Austria	7	3	3	1	7	5	+2
Azerbaijan	2	2	0	0	4	2	+2
Belarus	4	1	3	0	8	7	+1
Belgium	10	4	1	5	17	19	−2
Bulgaria	10	5	2	3	20	14	+6
Chile	1	1	0	0	3	0	+3
Croatia	2	2	0	0	7	1	+6
Cyprus	11	3	7	1	16	12	+4
Czech Republic	12	6	1	5	19	17	+2
Denmark	8	2	5	1	14	12	+2
England	24	7	6	11	23	39	−16
Estonia	2	1	0	1	2	2	0
Faroe Islands	2	2	0	0	5	0	+5
Finland	4	2	0	2	6	3	+3
France	20	3	4	13	19	44	−25
Georgia	6	4	0	2	20	6	+14
Germany	38	15	5	18	57	68	−11
Gibraltar	3	3	0	0	11	1	+10
Greece	13	7	0	6	19	15	+4
Hungary	10	3	1	6	21	18	+3
Iceland	2	1	1	0	2	0	+2
Israel	4	0	1	3	4	8	–4
Italy	29	3	10	16	22	46	−24
Kazakhstan	8	4	1	3	15	7	+8
Latvia	4	3	1	0	11	1	+10
Lithuania	6	5	1	0	12	2	+10
Luxembourg	4	4	0	0	25	3	+22
Malta	6	5	1	0	20	7	+13
Moldova	4	2	1	1	9	4	+5
Netherlands	7	4	1	2	14	15	−1
Northern Ireland	6	6	0	0	29	2	+27
Norway	11	7	1	3	25	10	+15
Poland	6	5	1	0	9	3	+6
Portugal	10	2	3	5	9	15	−6
Republic of Ireland	6	6	0	0	18	0	+18
Romania	7	6	1	0	17	4	+13
Russia	10	3	2	5	11	16	−5
Scotland	16	5	6	5	21	22	−1
Slovakia	4	1	2	1	5	5	0
Slovenia	2	2	0	0	5	0	+5
Spain	31	10	5	16	42	50	−8
Sweden	3	2	1	0	5	3	+2
Switzerland	20	7	8	5	35	23	+12
Turkey	6	3	2	1	9	5	+4
Ukraine	6	0	4	2	4	7	−3

== Top scorers in international competitions ==
Rank	Player	Goals	Years
1	(Socialist Federal Republic of Yugoslavia) Zoran Filipović	28	1970–1980
2	(Socialist Federal Republic of Yugoslavia) Bora Kostić	20	1951–1961, 1962–1966
2	(Socialist Federal Republic of Yugoslavia) Dušan Savić	20	1973–1982
4	(Serbia) Aleksandar Katai	19	2014–2016, 2020–
5	(Serbia) Nikola Žigić	17	2003–2006

== International individual awards ==
Ballon d'Or

- 2nd: (Socialist Federal Republic of Yugoslavia) Darko Pančev (1991)
- 2nd: (Socialist Federal Republic of Yugoslavia) Dejan Savićević (1991)
- 3rd: (Socialist Federal Republic of Yugoslavia) Dragan Džajić (1968)

European Golden Shoe

- (Socialist Federal Republic of Yugoslavia) Darko Pančev (1991)

European Cup top scorer

- (Socialist Federal Republic of Yugoslavia) Borislav Cvetković (1987)

Bravo Award

- (Socialist Federal Republic of Yugoslavia) Robert Prosinečki (1991)

UEFA Jubilee Golden Player

- (Serbia and Montenegro) Dragan Džajić (2003)
- (North Macedonia) Darko Pančev (2003)

UEFA Euro Golden Boot

- (Socialist Federal Republic of Yugoslavia) Dragan Džajić (1968)

UEFA Euro Team of the Tournament

- (Socialist Federal Republic of Yugoslavia) Vladimir Durković (1960)
- (Socialist Federal Republic of Yugoslavia) Dragoslav Šekularac (1960)
- (Socialist Federal Republic of Yugoslavia) Bora Kostić (1960)
- (Socialist Federal Republic of Yugoslavia) Dragan Džajić (1968)

FIFA World Cup All-Star Team

- (Socialist Federal Republic of Yugoslavia) Dragan Stojković (1990)

FIFA World Cup Best Young Player Award

- (Socialist Federal Republic of Yugoslavia) Robert Prosinečki (1990)

FIFA U-20 World Cup Golden Ball

- (Socialist Federal Republic of Yugoslavia) Robert Prosinečki (1987)

FIFA U-20 World Cup Golden Glove

- (Serbia) Predrag Rajković (2015)
