= Predrag Jovanović =

Predrag Jovanović may refer to:

- Predrag Jovanović (born 1950), Serbian musician and entertainer, known by his stage alias Peđa D'Boy
- Predrag Jovanović (footballer) (born 11 August 1965), retired Serbian footballer
- Predrag Jovanović (footballer, born 27 August 1965), retired Serbian footballer who played for FK Napredak Kruševac and FK Proleter Zrenjanin
