= Ljubiša Milojević =

Serbian footballer

Personal information
- Date of birth: 7 April 1967 (age 59)
- Place of birth: Kraljevo, SFR Yugoslavia
- Position: Forward

Senior career*
Years	Team	Apps	(Gls)
1988–1989	Sloga Kraljevo		
1989–1991	Red Star Belgrade	8	(1)
1989–1990	→ Rad (loan)	16	(3)
1991–1992	Rad	31	(12)
1992–1997	Aris Thessaloniki	149	(38)
1997–1998	Panetolikos		
Total		204	(54)

Managerial career
- 1999-2000: Sloga Kraljevo
- 2005: Sloga Kraljevo
- * Club domestic league appearances and goals

Ljubiša Milojević (Serbian Cyrillic: Љубиша Милојевић; born 7 April 1967) is a Serbian former footballer who played as a forward.

== Career ==
After starting out at his hometown club Sloga Kraljevo, Milojević was transferred to Red Star Belgrade in the summer of 1989. He was later sent out on loan to fellow Yugoslav First League side Rad during the 1989–90 season. Subsequently, Milojević returned to Red Star Belgrade and played eight games in the title-winning 1990–91 Yugoslav First League. He rejoined Rad in the summer of 1991, scoring 12 goals in 31 matches during the 1991–92 Yugoslav First League.

In the summer of 1992, Milojević moved abroad to Greece and signed with Aris Thessaloniki. He amassed 149 Alpha Ethniki appearances and scored 38 goals for the club over the course of five seasons. He also played for Beta Ethniki side Panetolikos, before retiring from the game.

== Honours ==
Red Star Belgrade

- Yugoslav First League: 1989–90, 1990–91
- Yugoslav Cup: 1989–90
