= Željko Kaluđerović =

Montenegrin footballer

Personal information
- Full name: Željko Kaluđerović
- Date of birth: 1 March 1964 (age 62)
- Place of birth: Bar, SFR Yugoslavia
- Position: Goalkeeper

Youth career
- Mornar

Senior career*
Years	Team	Apps	(Gls)
1981–1987	Mornar		
1987–1993	Red Star Belgrade	1	(0)
1992	Djurgården (loan)	0	(0)
1993–1994	Mornar		
- * Club domestic league appearances and goals

Željko Kaluđerović (Cyrillic: Жељко Калуђеровић; born 1 March 1964) is a Montenegrin retired footballer who played as a goalkeeper.

== Club career ==
As a son of former goalkeeper Božidar Kaluđerović, he started his career at Mornar and joined Red Star Belgrade in 1987. Kaluđerović featured as a substitute in the away match in the second round of the 1990–91 European Cup at Rangers. Red Star won the tournament as only Yugoslav team. In 1992, he was on an eight-month loan in Sweden. Back home his career didn't prosper with the start of the Yugoslav Wars and he rejoinend Mornar.

Kaluđerović is participating in a UEFA A-license coaching course in 2011 He is the goalkeeping coach at Mornar.
