= Enes Bešić =

Bosnia and Herzogovinian footballer

Personal information
- Full name: Enes Bešić
- Date of birth: 5 June 1963 (age 63)
- Place of birth: Bihać, SFR Yugoslavia
- Position: Midfielder

Senior career*
Years	Team	Apps	(Gls)
1980–1986	Čelik Zenica	154	(39)
1988–1990	Red Star Belgrade	24	(0)
1991	Salgueiros	4	(0)
- * Club domestic league appearances and goals

Enes Bešić (born 5 June 1963) is a Bosnian-Herzegovinian former football midfielder.

== Club career ==
He was one of the most influential players in the 1980s in Čelik Zenica that earned him a transfer to Belgrade giants Red Star in 1988. During the winter break of 1990-91 he moved to Portugal to play with Primeira Liga side Salgueiros.
