= Ivica Momčilović =

Serbian footballer and manager

Personal information
- Full name: Ivica Momčilović
- Date of birth: October 4, 1967 (age 59)
- Place of birth: Bojnik, SR Serbia, SFR Yugoslavia
- Height: 1.82 m (6 ft 0 in)
- Position: Midfielder

Senior career*
Years	Team	Apps	(Gls)
1988–1989	Napredak Kruševac	23	(5)
1990–1991	Red Star Belgrade	13	(0)
1991–1992	Rad	29	(1)
1992–1993	Red Star Belgrade	26	(2)
1993–1995	AEL Limassol	51	(0)
1995–1997	Rad	29	(3)
1997–1998	Trelleborgs FF	20	(0)
Total		191	(11)

Managerial career
- 2012–2019: Red Star Belgrade (assistant)
- 2023–2024: Trayal Kruševac
- 2026–: Radnički Pirot
- * Club domestic league appearances and goals

Ivica Momčilović (Serbian Cyrillic: Ивица Момчиловић; born 4 October 1967) is a Serbian football manager and former player.

Momčilović won the European Cup and Yugoslav First League with Red Star Belgrade in 1991. He did however not come off the bench in the European Cup final.

He was an assistant coach in the Red Star Belgrade youth section.

== Managerial statistics ==
As of 14 November 2026.

Managerial record by team and tenure
Team	From	To	Record				
Team	From	To	G	W	D	L	Win %
Trayal Kruševac	13 July 2023	31 May 2024	32	30	0	2	93.75
Radnički Pirot	15 January 2026	Present	29	11	5	13	37.93
Career total			61	41	5	15	67.21
