= Saša Nedeljković =

Serbian footballer

Personal information
- Full name: Saša Nedeljković
- Date of birth: 9 November 1967 (age 58)
- Place of birth: Belgrade, SFR Yugoslavia
- Height: 1.75 m (5 ft 9 in)
- Position: Defender

Youth career
- OFK Beograd

Senior career*
Years	Team	Apps	(Gls)
1985–1989	OFK Beograd	52	(1)
1989–1991	Rad	52	(3)
1991–1993	Red Star Belgrade	17	(0)
1993–1995	Heidelberg United	7	(0)
1995–1996	Adelaide City	12	(0)
1996	Napredak Kruševac	3	(2)
1997	Universitatea Craiova	8	(0)
1997–1998	Napredak Kruševac	1	(0)
- * Club domestic league appearances and goals

Saša Nedeljković (Cyrillic: Саша Недељковић, born 9 November 1967) is a Serbian retired footballer who played as a defender.

Nedeljković was a substitute for Red Star Belgrade in the 1991 European Super Cup and the 1991 Intercontinental Cup. He then played in Australia as well.
