= Vladimir Jugović =

Serbian footballer

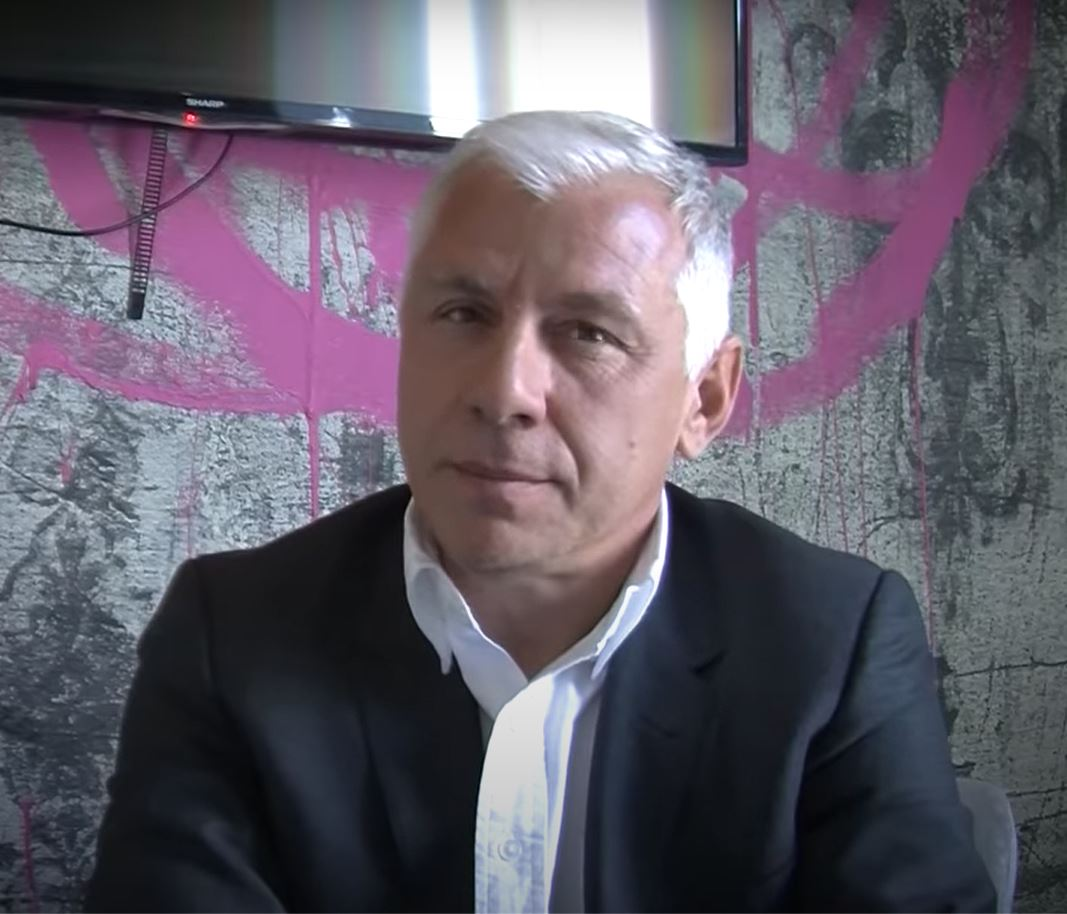

Personal information
- Date of birth: 30 August 1969 (age 57)
- Place of birth: Trstenik, SFR Yugoslavia
- Height: 1.78 m (5 ft 10 in)
- Position: Midfielder

Senior career*
| Years | Team | Apps | (Gls) |
| 1989–1992 | Red Star Belgrade | 62 | (11) |
| 1990 | → Rad (loan) | 16 | (7) |
| 1992–1995 | Sampdoria | 81 | (18) |
| 1995–1997 | Juventus | 56 | (8) |
| 1997–1998 | Lazio | 27 | (2) |
| 1998–1999 | Atlético Madrid | 17 | (3) |
| 1999–2001 | Internazionale | 38 | (3) |
| 2001–2003 | Monaco | 19 | (0) |
| 2003–2004 | Admira Wacker | 25 | (3) |
| 2004–2005 | LR Ahlen | 19 | (2) |
| Total | | 360 | (57) |

International career
| 1991–2002 | FR Yugoslavia (Note: Including 4 caps and 1 goal for SFR Yugoslavia.) | 41 | (3) |
- * Club domestic league appearances and goals

Vladimir Jugović (Serbian Cyrillic: Владимир Југовић, pronounced [ʋlǎdimiːr jûɡoʋitɕ]; born 30 August 1969) is a Serbian former professional footballer. A versatile player, he was usually employed as a left or attacking midfielder, but could play anywhere in midfield. He represented Yugoslavia at the 1998 FIFA World Cup and at UEFA Euro 2000, collecting 41 international appearances between 1991 and 2002, and scoring three goals.

He is currently a sporting director of Vojvodina.

Born in Milutovac, a village near Trstenik, Jugović played throughout his career for numerous top European teams. He won the European Cup and Intercontinental Cup with Red Star in 1991 and won both competitions again with Juventus in 1996.

== Club career ==
=== Red Star Belgrade ===
Jugović was scouted by Red Star at the age of 15 by former Red Star player Toma Milićević. After making his debut for Red Star, he was loaned to FK Rad in the second half of the 1989–90 season. When Ljupko Petrović became coach of Red Star, Jugović was brought back to the starting eleven. In 1991, Jugović played in the 1991 European Cup Final, which Red Star won. Subsequently, he won the Intercontinental Cup as Red Star beat Colo-Colo 3–0, scoring the first two goals. By the end of his career with Red Star, he was awarded the Star of Red Star and became one of the most celebrated footballers in Yugoslavia.

=== Sampdoria ===
Sampdoria invited Jugović at the insistence of Vujadin Boškov, who was their coach until 1992. He spent three successful seasons at Sampdoria, during which he helped the team win the 1993–94 Coppa Italia. Notably, he scored a brace in the 1995 UEFA Cup Winners' Cup semi-final first leg against Arsenal, but missed a penalty after overtime in the subsequent leg, after which Arsenal progressed.

=== Juventus ===
In 1995 Jugović was purchased from Sampdoria by Juventus, whose coach at the time was Marcello Lippi. In his first season, Juventus finished as runners-up in Serie A. In the 1996 UEFA Champions League Final, he came on as a substitute for Antonio Conte and scored the decisive penalty for Juventus against Ajax, following a 1–1 draw after extra-time. In a 2017 interview with Goal.com, he recalled that he felt calm before taking his penalty against Ajax keeper Edwin van der Sar. After his role in their Champions League victory, Jugović played for Juventus for one more season, during which he featured in the 1996 Intercontinental Cup, which Juventus won 1–0 over River Plate. That season, Juventus went on to win the 1996–97 Serie A title, after which Jugović left for Lazio. In total, he made 77 appearances for the Turin–based club, scoring 10 goals.

Looking back at the trainings content and discipline under Marcello Lippi he noted: "The way we were training was a thing to watch and analyze. We didn't have time to rest and we would begin our first training in the day with a 40 minute work in the gym succeeded by running sessions, and that was only a warm up. In the afternoon we had a tactical training combined with a football playing and the third drill was around 20:00 p.m. containing mostly stretching. So, none of our success happened by an accident, we deserved everything and i do not like when someone oppugn our achievements. That was maybe a reason why we had such a big amount of injuries. I think that no club today train as hard as we did then."

=== Later career ===
In the summer of 1997, he joined Lazio spending only one season with the Roman club winning his second Coppa Italia (1997–98 Coppa Italia), beating Milan in the two-leg final, also the club reached the 1998 UEFA Cup Final, losing to Inter in the all Italian final.

Jugović successively moved to Atlético Madrid for the 1998–99 season before joining Inter the following year, where he spent two seasons. Jugović finished his career at LR Ahlen, after stints with AS Monaco FC and VfB Admira Wacker Mödling.

== International career ==
Jugović made his debut for Yugoslavia's national team against Czechoslovakia in August 1991, while it still consisted of players from the collapsing SFR Yugoslavia. He was included to UEFA Euro 1992, but the nation would be suspended due to the Yugoslav Wars.

For the national team, Jugović played primarily as a left winger until the Euro 2000, where coach Vujadin Boškov deployed him as a central midfielder. He did not miss a single match for Yugoslavia at the 1998 FIFA World Cup. During the final 16 match against the Netherlands, Jugović was fouled by Jaap Stam, resulting in a penalty kick which Predrag Mijatović missed.

Although Jugović missed Yugoslavia's Euro 2000 qualifying campaign due to injury, he was called up by coach Vujadin Boškov for the tournament. He played as a central midfielder in the quarterfinal against the Netherlands, which Yugoslavia lost to by a score of 6–1.

== Style of play ==
A versatile, physically strong, and hard-working right-footed player, Jugović was usually employed as a left-sided or attacking midfielder, but could play anywhere in midfield, including in the centre, in a holding role, and on the right. He was mainly known for his tenacity, energy, generosity, intelligence, and tackling, but was also a talented player, with good technique, who could also exploit spaces by starting attacks with long balls or dictating play in midfield with his range of passing after winning back possession; he also possessed a good shot from any area of the pitch, and was known for his eye for goal. He was also used as a second striker on occasion, and even as a full-back. Despite his ability, however, he often struggled with injuries throughout his career. Beyond his footballing skills, he was also known for his leadership qualities.

== Career statistics ==
=== Club ===
| Club | Season | League | | Cup | | Continental | | Other | | Total | |
| Club | Season | Apps | Goals | Apps | Goals | Apps | Goals | Apps | Goals | Apps | Goals |
|---|---|---|---|---|---|---|---|---|---|---|---|
| Red Star Belgrade | 1989–90 | 1 | 0 | 0 | 0 | 0 | 0 | — | | 1 | 0 |
| Rad (loan) | 1989–90 | 16 | 7 | 0 | 0 | 0 | 0 | — | | 16 | 7 |
| Red Star Belgrade | 1990–91 | 32 | 7 | 8 | 0 | 9 | 0 | — | | 49 | 7 |
| Red Star Belgrade | 1991–92 | 29 | 4 | 9 | 3 | 10 | 0 | 2 (Note: One appearance in UEFA Super Cup, one appearance in Intercontinental Cup) | 2 | 50 | 9 |
| Red Star Belgrade | Total | 62 | 11 | 17 | 3 | 19 | 0 | 2 | 2 | 100 | 16 |
| Sampdoria | 1992–93 | 33 | 9 | 2 | 1 | — | | — | | 35 | 10 |
| Sampdoria | 1993–94 | 27 | 6 | 6 | 0 | — | | — | | 33 | 6 |
| Sampdoria | 1994–95 | 21 | 3 | 4 | 0 | 6 | 2 | 1 (Note: Appearance in Supercoppa Italiana) | 0 | 32 | 5 |
| Sampdoria | Total | 81 | 18 | 12 | 1 | 6 | 2 | 1 | 0 | 100 | 21 |
| Juventus | 1995–96 | 26 | 2 | 1 | 1 | 8 | 1 | — | | 35 | 4 |
| Juventus | 1996–97 | 30 | 6 | 3 | 0 | 7 | 0 | 2 | 0 | 42 | 6 |
| Juventus | Total | 56 | 8 | 4 | 1 | 15 | 1 | 2 | 0 | 77 | 10 |
| Lazio | 1997–98 | 27 | 2 | 9 | 3 | 6 | 1 | — | | 42 | 6 |
| Atlético Madrid | 1998–99 | 17 | 3 | 2 | 0 | 8 | 2 | — | | 27 | 5 |
| Internazionale | 1999–2000 | 17 | 2 | 4 | 0 | — | | 1 (Note: Appearance in Champions League play-off) | 0 | 22 | 2 |
| Internazionale | 2000–01 | 21 | 1 | 0 | 0 | 6 | 0 | 1 | 0 | 28 | 1 |
| Internazionale | Total | 38 | 3 | 4 | 0 | 6 | 0 | 2 | 0 | 50 | 3 |
| Monaco | 2001–02 | 19 | 0 | 3 | 0 | — | | 3 (Note: Appearances in Coupe de la Ligue) | 1 | 25 | 1 |
| Monaco | 2002–03 | 0 | 0 | 0 | 0 | — | | — | | 0 | 0 |
| Monaco | Total | 19 | 0 | 3 | 0 | — | | 3 | 1 | 25 | 1 |
| Admira Wacker | 2003–04 | 25 | 3 | 1 | 0 | — | | — | | 26 | 3 |
| LR Ahlen | 2004–05 | 19 | 2 | 2 | 0 | — | | — | | 21 | 2 |
| Career total | | 360 | 57 | 54 | 8 | 60 | 6 | 10 | 3 | 484 | 74 |

=== International ===
Appearances and goals by national team and year
| National team | Year | Apps | Goals |
|---|---|---|---|
| SFR Yugoslavia | 1991 | 3 | 1 |
| SFR Yugoslavia | 1992 | 1 | 0 |
| FR Yugoslavia | 1993* | 0 | 0 |
| FR Yugoslavia | 1994 | 2 | 0 |
| FR Yugoslavia | 1995 | 0 | 0 |
| FR Yugoslavia | 1996 | 7 | 1 |
| FR Yugoslavia | 1997 | 7 | 1 |
| FR Yugoslavia | 1998 | 11 | 0 |
| FR Yugoslavia | 1999 | 0 | 0 |
| FR Yugoslavia | 2000 | 8 | 0 |
| FR Yugoslavia | 2001 | 1 | 0 |
| FR Yugoslavia | 2002 | 1 | 0 |
| Total | | 41 | 3 |

- Note: Yugoslavia was banned from international football in 1993, since 1994 FR Yugoslavia became the successor of SFR Yugoslavia national team.

== Honours ==
Red Star Belgrade

- Yugoslav First League: 1989–90, 1990–91, 1991–92
- European Cup: 1990–91
- Intercontinental Cup: 1991

Sampdoria

- Coppa Italia: 1993–94

Juventus

- Serie A: 1996–97
- UEFA Champions League: 1995–96
- Intercontinental Cup: 1996
- UEFA Super Cup: 1996

Lazio

- Coppa Italia: 1997–98

Monaco

- Coupe de la Ligue: 2003

Individual

- Intercontinental Cup MVP of the Match Award: 1991
