= Slobodan Marović =

Montenegrin footballer and manager

Personal information
- Date of birth: 13 July 1964 (age 62)
- Place of birth: Bar, SFR Yugoslavia
- Height: 1.82 m (6 ft 0 in)
- Position: Defender

Youth career
- Mornar Bar

Senior career*
Years	Team	Apps	(Gls)
1984–1986	Osijek	26	(0)
1986–1991	Red Star Belgrade	124	(5)
1992–1994	IFK Norrköping	59	(5)
1994–1995	Silkeborg	15	(0)
1996–1997	Shenzhen Feiyada		

International career
1987–1989	Yugoslavia	4	(0)

Managerial career
- 2010–2012: Red Star Belgrade (Assistant)
- 2019–2020: Guangzhou R&F (Assistant)
- * Club domestic league appearances and goals

Slobodan Marović (Cyrillic: Cлободан Mapoвић, born 13 July 1964) is a Montenegrin football manager and retired player.

He is best known for his spell with Red Star Belgrade in the 1980s and early 1990s, being part of the side's European Cup victory in 1991.

== Playing career ==
=== Club ===
Born in Bar, SR Montenegro, during his playing career he also played for NK Osijek, IFK Norrköping, and Silkeborg IF.

=== International ===
Marović made his debut for Yugoslavia in an August 1987 friendly match against the Soviet Union and has earned a total of 4 caps, scoring no goals. His final international was a November 1989 friendly against Brazil.

== Managerial career ==
In December 2010 he has been appointed as assistant manager of Robert Prosinečki at Red Star Belgrade.

== Honours ==
Red Star Belgrade

- European Cup: 1991
- Yugoslav Championship: 1988, 1990, 1991
- Yugoslav Cup: 1990
