= 1991 Intercontinental Cup =

- Match programme cover
| Red Star Belgrade | Colo-Colo |
| (Socialist Federal Republic of Yugoslavia) | (Chile) |
| 3 | 0 |
- Date: 8 December 1991
- Venue: National Stadium, Tokyo
- Man of the Match: Vladimir Jugović (Red Star Belgrade)
- Referee: Kurt Röthlisberger (Switzerland)
- Attendance: 62,064

The 1991 Intercontinental Cup was an association football match played on 8 December 1991 between Red Star Belgrade of SFR Yugoslavia, winners of the 1990–91 European Cup, and Colo-Colo of Chile, winners of the 1991 Copa Libertadores. The match was played at the neutral venue of the National Stadium in Tokyo in front of 60,000 fans. Vladimir Jugović was named as man of the match.

== Match details ==
8 December 1991
12:00 JST

| Red Star Belgrade (Socialist Federal Republic of Yugoslavia) | 3–0 | (Chile) Colo-Colo |
|---|---|---|
| Jugović 19', 58'; Pančev 72' | Report |

National Stadium, Tokyo
Attendance: 62,064
Referee: Kurt Röthlisberger (Switzerland)

| Red Star | Colo Colo |

| GK | 1 | (Socialist Federal Republic of Yugoslavia) Zvonko Milojević |
| DF | 5 | (Romania) Miodrag Belodedici |
| DF | 2 | (Socialist Federal Republic of Yugoslavia) Duško Radinović |
| DF | 6 | (Socialist Federal Republic of Yugoslavia) Ilija Najdoski |
| DF | 3 | (Socialist Federal Republic of Yugoslavia) Goran Vasilijević | (yellow card) 48' |
| DF | 11 | (Socialist Federal Republic of Yugoslavia) Siniša Mihajlović | (yellow card) 47' |
| MF | 7 | (Socialist Federal Republic of Yugoslavia) Vlada Stošić |
| MF | 4 | (Socialist Federal Republic of Yugoslavia) Vladimir Jugović |
| MF | 8 | (Socialist Federal Republic of Yugoslavia) Milorad Ratković |
| MF | 10 | (Socialist Federal Republic of Yugoslavia) Dejan Savićević (c) | (red card) 42' |
| FW | 9 | (Socialist Federal Republic of Yugoslavia) Darko Pančev |
Substitutes:
| GK | 12 | (Socialist Federal Republic of Yugoslavia) Dragoje Leković |
| DF | 13 | (Socialist Federal Republic of Yugoslavia) Saša Nedeljković |
| DF | 14 | (Socialist Federal Republic of Yugoslavia) Miroslav Tanjga |
| FW | 15 | (Socialist Federal Republic of Yugoslavia) Ilija Ivić |
Manager:
(Socialist Federal Republic of Yugoslavia) Vladica Popović

| GK | 1 | (Argentina) Daniel Morón |
| DF | 3 | (Chile) Lizardo Garrido |
| DF | 4 | (Chile) Javier Margas |
| DF | 6 | (Chile) Miguel Ramírez | (yellow card) 42' |
| DF | 8 | (Chile) Agustín Salvatierra | | (substituted off) 65' |
| MF | 2 | (Chile) Gabriel Mendoza |
| MF | 5 | (Chile) Eduardo Vilches |
| MF | 7 | (Argentina) Marcelo Barticciotto |
| MF | 10 | (Chile) Jaime Pizarro (c) |
| FW | 9 | (Chile) Patricio Yáñez |
| FW | 11 | (Chile) Rubén Martínez | | (substituted off) 61' |
Substitutes:
| GK | 12 | (Chile) Marcelo Ramírez |
| FW | 13 | (Chile) Luis Pérez |
| FW | 14 | (Argentina) Ricardo Dabrowski | | (substituted on) 65' |
| MF | 15 | (Chile) Raúl Ormeño |
| FW | 16 | (Chile) Hugo Rubio | | (substituted on) 61' |
Manager:
(Socialist Federal Republic of Yugoslavia) Mirko Jozić

Assistant referees:
Samuel Yam-Ming Chan (Hong Kong)
Kiichiro Tachi (Japan)
Fourth official:
Shizuo Takada (Japan)

== See also ==
- 1990–91 European Cup
- 1991 Copa Libertadores
- Red Star Belgrade in European football
- Srbija do Tokija
