= Duško Savić =

Bosnian Serb footballer

Personal information
- Full name: Duško Savić
- Date of birth: 1 July 1968 (age 58)
- Place of birth: Požega, SFR Yugoslavia
- Height: 1.77 m (5 ft 10 in)
- Position: Midfielder

Youth career
- Sloga Požega

Senior career*
| Years | Team | Apps | (Gls) |
| 1988–1990 | Sloboda Užice | 62 | (9) |
| 1991–1992 | Red Star Belgrade | 7 | (0) |
| 1992–1993 | Ionikos | 12 | (2) |
- * Club domestic league appearances and goals

Duško Savić (Serbian Cyrillic: Душко Савић, born 1 July 1968) is a former Bosnian Serb footballer.

== Career ==
He played with FK Sloboda Užice before joining Red Star Belgrade with which they won the Yugoslav First League in 1990–91 and 1991–92.

Savić had a spell with Ionikos in the Super League Greece.
