= Slaviša Čula =

Serbian footballer

Slaviša Čula Славиша Чула
Personal information
- Full name: Slaviša Čula
- Date of birth: November 28, 1968 (age 57)
- Place of birth: Kostolac, SFR Yugoslavia
- Position: Striker

Senior career*
Years	Team	Apps	(Gls)
1988	Napredak Kruševac	9	(0)
1989–1990	Sutjeska	32	(5)
1990–1992	Red Star Belgrade	10	(0)
1991	→ Proleter Zrenjanin (loan)	10	(1)
1992–1993	Borac Banja Luka	21	(11)
1993	Örgryte	10	(1)
1996	Dinamo București	14	(5)
1997	Vanspor	15	(2)
1998-1999	Hapoel Be'er Sheva	10	(2)
1999–2000	EN Paralimni	44	(34)
2000–2001	Olympiakos Nicosia	24	(10)
2001–2005	Rudar Kostolac		
- * Club domestic league appearances and goals

Slaviša Čula (Serbian Cyrillic: Славиша Чула; born 28 November 1968) is a Serbian retired footballer.

== Career ==
During his career he had played for FK Napredak Kruševac, FK Sutjeska Nikšić, Red Star Belgrade, FK Proleter Zrenjanin, FK Borac Banja Luka, Örgryte IS, FC Dinamo București, Hapoel Be'er Sheva, Enosis Neon Paralimni FC, Olympiakos Nicosia and FK Rudar Kostolac. He won the Yugoslav First League in 1991.
