= Duško Radinović =

Montenegrin footballer

Personal information
- Full name: Duško Radinović
- Date of birth: 8 February 1963 (age 63)
- Place of birth: Titograd, SFR Yugoslavia
- Height: 1.76 m (5 ft 9 in)
- Position: Defender

Senior career*
Years	Team	Apps	(Gls)
1981–1985	OFK Titograd		
1985–1989	Sutjeska		
1989–1993	Red Star Belgrade	89	(6)
1993–1997	Degerfors	120	(6)
1998–1999	Brage		
2000	IFK Malmö		
- * Club domestic league appearances and goals

Duško Radinović (Serbian Cyrillic: Душко Радиновић; born 8 February 1963) is a Montenegrin retired footballer.

== Club career ==
He is best known for his spell with Red Star Belgrade in the early 1990s, being part of the side's European Cup victory although he did not feature in the final. He also won the Intercontinental Cup 1991, in which he played the whole game.

== International career ==
He was included by Yugoslavia national football team to UEFA Euro 1992, but the nation would be suspended due to the Yugoslav Wars.
