= Milić Jovanović =

Serbian retired footballer (born 1966)

Personal information
- Full name: Milić Jovanović
- Date of birth: 10 February 1966 (age 60)
- Place of birth: Kruševac, SFR Yugoslavia
- Height: 2.01 m (6 ft 7 in)
- Position: Goalkeeper

Senior career*
Years	Team	Apps	(Gls)
1988–1990	Napredak Kruševac	57	(0)
1990–1992	Red Star Belgrade	6	(0)
1992–1993	Mogren	11	(0)
1993–1994	Torreense	33	(0)
1994–1996	Nacional	58	(0)
1996–2001	Leça	57	(0)
Total		222	(0)

Managerial career
- 2003: Leça
- 2008–2009: Leça
- 2010–2011: Leça (assistant)
- * Club domestic league appearances and goals

Milić Jovanović (Serbian Cyrillic: Милић Јовановић; born 10 February 1966) is a Serbian retired footballer who played as a goalkeeper.

== Playing career ==
Born in Kruševac, Socialist Federal Republic of Yugoslavia, Jovanović played for FK Napredak Kruševac, Red Star Belgrade and FK Mogren in his homeland. He won the 1990–91 Yugoslav First League with Red Star, acting as backup to Stevan Stojanović, and he played against Anderlecht in the 1991–92 European Cup.

In 1993, aged 27, Jovanović moved to Portugal where he would remain the following eight years, until his retirement. He started with S.C.U. Torreense in the second division, then switched to C.D. Nacional for a further two years in the category.

Jovanović made his Portuguese top level debut in the 1996–97 season, appearing in only one game, a 0–1 away loss against Gil Vicente FC. During most of his spell in Leça da Palmeira he played understudy to compatriot Vladan Stojković, and totalled eight matches in the main division, eventually retiring in 2001 at the age of 35 with the club again in level two.

== Post-playing career ==
After his retirement, Jovanović worked with his last club as a goalkeeping coach. He also had head and assistant coach spells there.
