= Predrag Jovanović (footballer) =

Serbian footballer

Personal information
- Date of birth: 11 August 1965 (age 61)
- Place of birth: Belgrade, SFR Yugoslavia
- Height: 1.85 m (6 ft 1 in)
- Position: Forward

Senior career*
Years	Team	Apps	(Gls)
1988–1989	Maribor		
1989–1991	Sloboda Tuzla	50	(18)
1991–1992	Red Star Belgrade	3	(0)
1992–1993	Stuttgarter Kickers	13	(4)
1993–1994	Kriens	17	(3)
1994–1995	Niort	15	(6)
1995–1996	Železnik		
1996–1997	Charleroi	16	(2)
1997–1998	Olympic Charleroi	13	(5)
1998–1999	Železnik	6	(0)
1999–2000	Pirmasens	11	(4)
2000–2001	Bonnyrigg White Eagles		
- * Club domestic league appearances and goals

Predrag Jovanović (Serbian Cyrillic: Предраг Јовановић; born 11 August 1965) is a Serbian former professional footballer who played as a forward.

== Career ==
In 1989, Jovanović moved from Maribor to Yugoslav First League side Sloboda Tuzla. He spent two seasons with the club (1989–90 and 1990–91), before signing with European Cup winners Red Star Belgrade.
