= Zvonko Milojević =

Serbian footballer

Personal information
- Date of birth: 30 August 1971 (age 55)
- Place of birth: Jagodina, SFR Yugoslavia
- Height: 1.89 m (6 ft 2 in)
- Position: Goalkeeper

Youth career
- Jagodina

Senior career*
Years	Team	Apps	(Gls)
1989–1997	Red Star Belgrade	150	(0)
1997–2003	Anderlecht	31	(0)
2003–2007	Lokeren	30	(0)
Total		201	(0)

International career
1995–1997	FR Yugoslavia	9	(0)
1997	FR Yugoslavia XI	1	(0)
- * Club domestic league appearances and goals

Zvonko Milojević (Serbian Cyrillic: Звонко Милојевић; born 30 August 1971) is a Serbian retired football goalkeeper.

== Club career ==
Having made his first team debut for Red Star Belgrade at only 17 years of age in the return leg of the 1989-90 UEFA Cup matchup versus 1. FC Köln, his first years with the club were spent as a deputy to Stevan Stojanović. After Stojanović moved on in summer 1991 following the European Cup win, 20-year-old Milojević shared the goalkeeping load with Dragoje Leković who was brought in. The following year Milojević became the first choice goalie and continued as such until 1997 when he left. Afterward, he continued his career in Belgium where he played for Anderlecht and Lokeren.

== International career ==
On the national level, Milojević made his debut for FR Yugoslavia in a February 1995 Carlsberg Cup match against South Korea and earned a total of 10 caps (including one unofficial, no goals).His final international was at the 1997 Carlsberg Cup against a Hong Kong XI.

== Personal life ==
On 15 November 2007 Milojević was involved in a car accident in Germany, when a Polish truck collided with his car while on the emergency lane. He received severe injuries and since spends his time in a wheelchair as he has been paralyzed from the waist down.

== Honours ==
Anderlecht

- Belgian Super Cup: 2000
