= Rade Tošić =

Bosnian footballer

Personal information
- Date of birth: 31 March 1965 (age 61)
- Place of birth: Tuzla, SR Bosnia and Herzegovina, SFR Yugoslavia
- Position: Defender

Senior career*
Years	Team	Apps	(Gls)
1982–1988	Sloboda Tuzla	116	(4)
1988–1990	Hajduk Split	48	(1)
1990–1992	Red Star Belgrade	18	(0)
1992–1993	Mérida	14	(0)
1993–1995	Castellón	51	(1)
1995–1996	Vall de Uxó		

International career
1988	Yugoslavia	1	(0)
- * Club domestic league appearances and goals

Rade Tošić (Serbian Cyrillic: Paдe Toшић, born March 31, 1965) is a Bosnian former football player. He was born in the Ugljevik region of Yugoslavia, now a part of Bosnia and Herzegovina.

== Club career ==
Tošić played for FK Sloboda Tuzla, NK Hajduk Split and Red Star Belgrade in the Yugoslav First League.

== International career ==
He made one appearance for Yugoslavia, in a March 1988 friendly match against Italy, coming on as a late substitute for Vujadin Stanojković.
