= List of Red Star Belgrade seasons =

A season-by-season record of Red Star Belgrade's league performances:

Season	League									Cup	Europe	Top goalscorer(s)^{1}		Notes
Season	Division	Pld	W	D	L	GF	GA	Pts	Pos	Cup	Europe	Player(s)	Goals	Notes
1946–47	Yugoslav First League	26	18	2	6	66	23	38	3rd	QF		(Socialist Federal Republic of Yugoslavia) Kosta Tomašević	16	
1947–48	Yugoslav First League	18	5	6	7	24	25	16	5th	Winners		(Socialist Federal Republic of Yugoslavia) Predrag Đajić (Socialist Federal Republic of Yugoslavia) Kosta Tomašević	6	^{2}
1948–49	Yugoslav First League	18	11	4	3	37	19	26	2nd	Winners		(Socialist Federal Republic of Yugoslavia) Kosta Tomašević	20	
1950	Yugoslav First League	18	12	2	4	44	18	26	2nd	Winners		(Socialist Federal Republic of Yugoslavia) Kosta Tomašević	19	
1951	Yugoslav First League	22	17	1	4	50	21	35	1st	SF		(Socialist Federal Republic of Yugoslavia) Kosta Tomašević	19	^{3}
1952	Yugoslav First League; Preliminary stage	10	7	0	3	20	16	14	1st	Runners-up		(Socialist Federal Republic of Yugoslavia) Branislav Vukosavljević	14	^{4}
1952	Yugoslav First League; Final Round	6	3	2	1	11	6	8	2nd	Runners-up		(Socialist Federal Republic of Yugoslavia) Branislav Vukosavljević	14	^{4}
1952–53	Yugoslav First League	22	13	5	4	47	27	31	1st	SF		(Socialist Federal Republic of Yugoslavia) Todor Živanović	22	
1953–54	Yugoslav First League	26	17	4	5	51	22	38	3rd	Runners-up		(Socialist Federal Republic of Yugoslavia) Kosta Tomašević	12	
1954–55	Yugoslav First League	26	14	5	7	57	36	33	4th	SF		(Socialist Federal Republic of Yugoslavia) Ivan Toplak	19	
1955–56	Yugoslav First League	26	16	8	2	62	29	40	1st			(Socialist Federal Republic of Yugoslavia) Ivan Toplak	22	^{5}
1956–57	Yugoslav First League	26	17	5	4	66	23	39	1st	QF	European Cup – SF	(Socialist Federal Republic of Yugoslavia) Bora Kostić	33	^{6}
1957–58	Yugoslav First League	26	10	8	8	45	38	28	4th	Winners	European Cup – QF	(Socialist Federal Republic of Yugoslavia) Bora Kostić	29	
1958–59	Yugoslav First League	22	14	3	5	50	19	31	1st	Winners		(Socialist Federal Republic of Yugoslavia) Bora Kostić	36	
1959–60	Yugoslav First League	22	15	3	4	47	25	33	1st	R1	European Cup – R1	(Socialist Federal Republic of Yugoslavia) Bora Kostić	21	
1960–61	Yugoslav First League	22	13	5	4	38	21	31	2nd	R2	European Cup – R1	(Socialist Federal Republic of Yugoslavia) Antun Rudinski	13	
1961–62	Yugoslav First League	22	9	6	7	35	25	24	4th	SF	Inter-Cities Fairs Cup – SF	(Socialist Federal Republic of Yugoslavia) Dušan Maravić	16	
1962–63	Yugoslav First League	26	7	11	8	21	26	25	7th	QF	Inter-Cities Fairs Cup – QF	(Socialist Federal Republic of Yugoslavia) Bora Kostić	14	
1963–64	Yugoslav First League	26	14	8	4	45	22	36	1st	Winners		(Socialist Federal Republic of Yugoslavia) Zoran Prljinčević	19	
1964–65	Yugoslav First League	28	13	9	6	50	38	35	3rd	SF	European Cup – R1	(Socialist Federal Republic of Yugoslavia) Zoran Prljinčević	18	
1965–66	Yugoslav First League	30	12	7	11	54	54	31	5th	R1	Inter-Cities Fairs Cup – R1	(Socialist Federal Republic of Yugoslavia) Bora Kostić	15	
1966–67	Yugoslav First League	30	12	8	10	53	46	32	5th	QF	Inter-Cities Fairs Cup – R2	(Socialist Federal Republic of Yugoslavia) Dragan Džajić	17	
1967–68	Yugoslav First League	30	16	11	3	64	30	43	1st	Winners		(Socialist Federal Republic of Yugoslavia) Vojin Lazarević	26	
1968–69	Yugoslav First League	34	18	12	4	75	30	48	1st	SF	European Cup – R2	(Socialist Federal Republic of Yugoslavia) Vojin Lazarević	26	
1969–70	Yugoslav First League	34	20	6	8	67	37	46	1st	Winners	European Cup – R2	(Socialist Federal Republic of Yugoslavia) Dragan Džajić	18	
1970–71	Yugoslav First League	34	14	8	12	62	46	36	6th	Winners	European Cup – SF	(Socialist Federal Republic of Yugoslavia) Zoran Filipović	31	
1971–72	Yugoslav First League	34	19	11	4	57	21	49	2nd	QF	Cup Winners' Cup – QF	(Socialist Federal Republic of Yugoslavia) Jovan Aćimović	12	
1972–73	Yugoslav First League	34	21	10	3	71	28	52	1st	Runners-up	UEFA Cup – R3	(Socialist Federal Republic of Yugoslavia) Vojin Lazarević	29	
1973–74	Yugoslav First League	34	19	5	10	72	46	43	3rd	R1	European Cup – QF	(Socialist Federal Republic of Yugoslavia) Stanislav Karasi	17	
1974–75	Yugoslav First League	34	16	8	10	61	44	40	3rd		Cup Winners' Cup – SF	(Socialist Federal Republic of Yugoslavia) Dušan Savić	18	^{5}
1975–76	Yugoslav First League	34	16	8	10	53	31	40	4th	R2	UEFA Cup – R2	(Socialist Federal Republic of Yugoslavia) Zoran Filipović	17	
1976–77	Yugoslav First League	34	20	10	4	67	37	50	1st	R1	UEFA Cup – R3	(Socialist Federal Republic of Yugoslavia) Zoran Filipović	27	
1977–78	Yugoslav First League	34	21	7	6	58	26	49	2nd	R2	European Cup – R2	(Socialist Federal Republic of Yugoslavia) Zoran Filipović	21	
1978–79	Yugoslav First League	34	16	9	9	51	33	41	3rd	SF	UEFA Cup – Runners-up	(Socialist Federal Republic of Yugoslavia) Dušan Savić	33	^{7}
1979–80	Yugoslav First League	34	19	10	5	54	26	48	1st	Runners-up	UEFA Cup – R3	(Socialist Federal Republic of Yugoslavia) Dušan Savić	18	
1980–81	Yugoslav First League	34	15	14	5	62	31	44	1st	R2	European Cup – QF	(Socialist Federal Republic of Yugoslavia) Zdravko Borovnica	15	
1981–82	Yugoslav First League	34	17	10	7	68	40	44	2nd	Winners	European Cup – QF	(Socialist Federal Republic of Yugoslavia) Dušan Savić	25	
1982–83	Yugoslav First League	34	13	11	10	55	50	37	5th	R2	Cup Winners' Cup – R2	(Socialist Federal Republic of Yugoslavia) Dušan Savić	16	
1983–84	Yugoslav First League	34	17	10	7	52	26	44	1st	Runners-up	UEFA Cup – R1	(Socialist Federal Republic of Yugoslavia) Milko Đurovski	17	
1984–85	Yugoslav First League	34	15	6	12	63	38	38	4th	Winners	European Cup – R1	(Socialist Federal Republic of Yugoslavia) Sulejman Halilović	24	
1985–86	Yugoslav First League	34	21	7	6	73	38	49	2nd	SF	Cup Winners' Cup – QF	(Socialist Federal Republic of Yugoslavia) Husref Musemić	17	
1986–87	Yugoslav First League	34	16	9	9	57	37	41	3rd	SF	European Cup – QF	(Socialist Federal Republic of Yugoslavia) Borislav Cvetković	21	
1987–88	Yugoslav First League	34	17	11	6	66	39	45	1st	Runners-up	UEFA Cup – R2	(Socialist Federal Republic of Yugoslavia) Dragan Stojković	21	
1988–89	Yugoslav First League	34	18	7 (2)	9	55	30	38	2nd	QF	European Cup – R2	(Socialist Federal Republic of Yugoslavia) Dragan Stojković	15	^{8}
1989–90	Yugoslav First League	34	24	5 (3)	5	79	29	51	1st	Winners	UEFA Cup – R3	(Socialist Federal Republic of Yugoslavia) Darko Pančev	35	^{8}
1990–91	Yugoslav First League	36	25	6 (4)	5	88	35	54	1st	Runners-up	European Cup – Winners	(Socialist Federal Republic of Yugoslavia) Darko Pančev	45	^{8} ^{9}
1991–92	Yugoslav First League	33	23	5 (4)	5	77	24	50	1st	Runners-up	European Cup – Group	(Socialist Federal Republic of Yugoslavia) Darko Pančev	36	^{8}
1991–92	Yugoslav First League	33	23	5 (4)	5	77	24	50	1st	Runners-up	UEFA Super Cup – Runners-up	(Socialist Federal Republic of Yugoslavia) Darko Pančev	36	^{8}
1991–92	Yugoslav First League	33	23	5 (4)	5	77	24	50	1st	Runners-up	Intercontinental Cup – Winners	(Socialist Federal Republic of Yugoslavia) Darko Pančev	36	^{8}
1992–93	First League of FR Yugoslavia	36	19	13	4	70	25	51	2nd	Winners		(Serbia and Montenegro) Anto Drobnjak	24	^{10} ^{11}
1993–94	First League of FR Yugoslavia	18	10	5	5	38	16	25	2nd	SF		(Serbia and Montenegro) Ilija Ivić	20	^{12} ^{11}
1993–94	First League of FR Yugoslavia	18	12	2	4	40	18	37	2nd	SF		(Serbia and Montenegro) Ilija Ivić	20	^{12} ^{11}
1994–95	First League of FR Yugoslavia	18	10	5	3	36	12	25	1st	Winners		(Serbia and Montenegro) Darko Kovačević (Serbia and Montenegro) Nebojša Krupniković	28	^{12} ^{11}
1994–95	First League of FR Yugoslavia	18	14	3	1	63	17	42	1st	Winners		(Serbia and Montenegro) Darko Kovačević (Serbia and Montenegro) Nebojša Krupniković	28	^{12} ^{11}
1995–96	First League of FR Yugoslavia	18	14	1	3	49	16	43	2nd	Winners	UEFA Cup – QR	(Serbia and Montenegro) Nebojša Krupniković	26	^{12}
1995–96	First League of FR Yugoslavia	18	9	5	4	27	16	48	2nd	Winners	UEFA Cup – QR	(Serbia and Montenegro) Nebojša Krupniković	26	^{12}
1996–97	First League of FR Yugoslavia	33	25	3	5	79	30	78	2nd	Winners	Cup Winners' Cup – R2	(Serbia and Montenegro) Zoran Jovičić	27	^{13}
1997–98	First League of FR Yugoslavia	33	27	3	3	86	22	84	2nd	SF	Cup Winners' Cup – R1	(Serbia and Montenegro) Dejan Stanković	21	
1998–99	First League of FR Yugoslavia	24	15	6	3	54	18	51	3rd	Winners	UEFA Cup – R2	(Serbia and Montenegro) Goran Drulić (Serbia and Montenegro) Jovan Gojković	14	
1999–2000	First League of FR Yugoslavia	40	33	6	1	85	19	105	1st	Winners	UEFA Cup – R1	(Serbia and Montenegro) Mihajlo Pjanović	25	
2000–01	First League of FR Yugoslavia	34	28	4	2	93	20	88	1st	Runners-up	Champions League – QR3	(Serbia and Montenegro) Goran Drulić	27	
2000–01	First League of FR Yugoslavia	34	28	4	2	93	20	88	1st	Runners-up	UEFA Cup – R2	(Serbia and Montenegro) Goran Drulić	27	
2001–02	First League of FR Yugoslavia	34	18	12	4	54	28	66	2nd	Winners	Champions League – QR3	(Serbia and Montenegro) Mihajlo Pjanović	16	
2001–02	First League of FR Yugoslavia	34	18	12	4	54	28	66	2nd	Winners	UEFA Cup – R1	(Serbia and Montenegro) Mihajlo Pjanović	16	
2002–03	First League of Serbia and Montenegro	34	21	7	6	68	26	70	2nd	Runners-up	UEFA Cup – R2	(Serbia and Montenegro) Mihajlo Pjanović	22	^{14}
2003–04	First League of Serbia and Montenegro	30	23	5	2	59	13	74	1st	Winners	UEFA Cup – R2	(Serbia and Montenegro) Nikola Žigić	27	
2004–05	First League of Serbia and Montenegro	30	23	5	2	66	18	74	2nd	Runners-up	Champions League – QR3	(Serbia and Montenegro) Marko Pantelić	24	
2004–05	First League of Serbia and Montenegro	30	23	5	2	66	18	74	2nd	Runners-up	UEFA Cup – R1	(Serbia and Montenegro) Marko Pantelić	24	
2005–06	Serbia and Montenegro SuperLiga	30	25	3	2	73	23	78	1st	Winners	UEFA Cup – Group	(Serbia and Montenegro) Nikola Žigić	20	
2006–07	Serbian SuperLiga	32	23	5	4	55	27	74	1st	Winners	Champions League – QR3	(Serbia) Dušan Đokić	16	^{15}
2006–07	Serbian SuperLiga	32	23	5	4	55	27	74	1st	Winners	UEFA Cup – R1	(Serbia) Dušan Đokić	16	^{15}
2007–08	Serbian SuperLiga	33	21	12	0	65	22	75	2nd	SF	Champions League – QR3	(Serbia) Nenad Jestrović	16	
2007–08	Serbian SuperLiga	33	21	12	0	65	22	75	2nd	SF	UEFA Cup – Group	(Serbia) Nenad Jestrović	16	
2008–09	Serbian SuperLiga	33	17	8	8	59	32	59	3rd	SF	UEFA Cup – QR2	(Serbia) Nenad Milijaš	23	
2009–10	Serbian SuperLiga	30	23	2	5	53	17	71	2nd	Winners	Europa League – Play off	(Serbia) Dejan Lekić	17	
2010–11	Serbian SuperLiga	30	22	4	4	52	18	70	2nd	SF	Europa League – QR3	(Serbia) Andrija Kaluđerović	20	
2011–12	Serbian SuperLiga	30	21	5	4	57	18	68	2nd	Winners	Europa League – Play off	(Colombia) Cristian Borja	14	
2012–13	Serbian SuperLiga	30	20	2	8	55	35	62	2nd	QF	Europa League – Play off	(Serbia) Ognjen Mudrinski	12	
2013–14	Serbian SuperLiga	30	23	3	4	66	27	72	1st	QF	Europa League – QR3	(Serbia) Dragan Mrđa	20	
2014–15	Serbian SuperLiga	30	19	7	4	46	20	64	2nd	R2		(Serbia) Darko Lazović	10	
2015–16	Serbian SuperLiga	37	30	5	2	97	27	54	1st	R2	Europa League – QR1	(Serbia) Aleksandar Katai	23	
2016–17	Serbian SuperLiga	37	30	4	3	93	33	55	2nd	Runners-up	Champions League – QR3	(Ghana) Richmond Boakye	16	
2016–17	Serbian SuperLiga	37	30	4	3	93	33	55	2nd	Runners-up	Europa League – Play off	(Ghana) Richmond Boakye	16	
2017–18	Serbian SuperLiga	37	32	4	1	96	19	60	1st	QF	Europa League – Round of 32	(Serbia) Aleksandar Pešić	29	^{16}
2018–19	Serbian SuperLiga	37	33	3	1	94	20	60	1st	Runners-up	Champions League – Group	(Comoros) Ben	25	^{17}
2019–20	Serbian SuperLiga	30	25	3	2	68	18	78	1st	SF	Champions League – Group	(Comoros) Ben	14	
2020–21	Serbian SuperLiga	38	35	3	0	114	20	108	1st	Winners	Champions League – QR3	(Montenegro) Mirko Ivanić	20	
2020–21	Serbian SuperLiga	38	35	3	0	114	20	108	1st	Winners	Europa League – Round of 32	(Montenegro) Mirko Ivanić	20	
2021–22	Serbian SuperLiga	37	32	4	1	95	19	100	1st	Winners	Champions League – QR3	(Serbia) Aleksandar Katai	33	
2021–22	Serbian SuperLiga	37	32	4	1	95	19	100	1st	Winners	Europa League – Round of 16	(Serbia) Aleksandar Katai	33	
2022–23	Serbian SuperLiga	37	30	7	0	96	19	97	1st	Winners	Champions League – Play off	(Serbia) Aleksandar Katai	19	
2022–23	Serbian SuperLiga	37	30	7	0	96	19	97	1st	Winners	Europa League – Group	(Serbia) Aleksandar Katai	19	
2023–24	Serbian SuperLiga	37	31	3	3	94	28	96	1st	Winners	Champions League – Group	(Senegal) Cherif Ndiaye	15	
2024–25	Serbian SuperLiga	37	32	4	1	123	35	100	1st	Winners	Champions League – League	(Senegal) Cherif Ndiaye	22	

1 Goals in all competitions are counted.
2 First title in domestic cup competitions.
3 First title in domestic league competitions.
4 The 1952 season was shortened and sped-up. The reason for the changes was a desire to implement the fall-spring competition format. Competition took place in two phases. In first clubs were divided into two preliminary groups of six teams each. Based on their ranking at the end of preliminary groups they were promoted to three groups: Title, Central and Relegation. Each of them containing four teams.
5 Cup competition was not held for 1955–56 and 1974–75 seasons.
6 First season in which club entered European competitions.
7 First final in European competitions.
8 Between 1988–89 and 1991–92, drawn games went to penalties with the winners of the shoot out gaining the point. Figures in brackets represent points won in such shoot outs.
9 First European title.
10 First season of Federal Republic of Yugoslavia's League.
11 Was unable to compete in European competitions due to UN sanctions.
12 Between 1993–94 and 1995–96 league was divided into two groups, A and B, of ten teams each. In the first half of competition teams played each other twice, and based on number of points won and their position, each team was given a certain number of "bonus points". In the start of spring part of competition four last teams from A league were dropped to B league, and replaced by the top four teams from B league. Again teams played each other twice, and in the end final positions were determined by the sum of points won at the end of Spring part of competition and bonus points won in the Fall part of competition.
13 From this season onward for victory was awarded three points instead of two.
14 First season of Serbia and Montenegro's League.
15 First season of Serbian SuperLiga.
16 Managed to qualify for group stage and advance through it for the first time since UEFA Europa League was established in 2009.
17 Managed to qualify for group stage for the first time since UEFA Champions League was established in 1992.
