= 1958–59 Red Star Belgrade season =

Red Star Belgrade
1958–59 season
- Chairman: Dušan Blagojević
- Manager: Milorad Pavić
- Yugoslav First League: 1st
- Yugoslav Cup: Winners
- Danube Cup: Winners
- Top goalscorer: League: Bora Kostić (25); All: Bora Kostić (45)

During the 1958–59 season, Red Star Belgrade participated in the 1958–59 Yugoslav First League, 1958–59 Yugoslav Cup and 1958 Danube Cup.

== Season summary ==
Red Star won their first double in this season. Rajko Mitić played his last game for Red Star in the 1957–58 Yugoslav Cup final against Velež Mostar.

On 30 April 1959, Red Star played a friendly match against Milan.

30 April 1959	Red Star Belgrade (Socialist Federal Republic of Yugoslavia)	3–4	(Italy) Milan	JNA Stadium, Belgrade
	Maravić 51', 55'; Rudinski 64'		Spajić 2' (o.g.); Altafini 10', 34'; Grillo 44'	Attendance: 45,000

== Squad ==
Name	Yugoslav First League		Yugoslav Cup		Danube Cup		Total	
Name	Apps	Goals	Apps	Goals	Apps	Goals	Apps	Goals
Goalkeepers
(Socialist Federal Republic of Yugoslavia) Vladimir Beara	19	0	4	0	0	0	23	0
(Socialist Federal Republic of Yugoslavia) Tatomir Radunović	2	0	2	0	5	0	9	0
(Socialist Federal Republic of Yugoslavia) Jovan Gajić	0	0	0	0	3	0	3	0
(Socialist Federal Republic of Yugoslavia) Špira Đurić	1	0	0	0	0	0	1	0
Defenders
(Socialist Federal Republic of Yugoslavia) Ljubiša Spajić	20	0	3	0	8	0	31	0
(Socialist Federal Republic of Yugoslavia) Miljan Zeković	20	0	5	0	5	0	30	0
(Socialist Federal Republic of Yugoslavia) Vladimir Durković	18	0	5	0	1	0	24	0
(Socialist Federal Republic of Yugoslavia) Dimitrije Stojanović	7	0	1	0	8	0	16	0
(Socialist Federal Republic of Yugoslavia) Branko Nešović	2	0	1	0	0	0	3	0
(Socialist Federal Republic of Yugoslavia) Novak Tomić	0	0	0	0	3	0	3	0
Midfielders
(Socialist Federal Republic of Yugoslavia) Nikola Stipić	17	2	4	0	8	2	29	4
(Socialist Federal Republic of Yugoslavia) Dragoslav Šekularac	18	2	4	0	3	1	25	3
(Socialist Federal Republic of Yugoslavia) Ranko Borozan	13	0	4	0	8	1	25	1
(Socialist Federal Republic of Yugoslavia) Lazar Tasić	15	1	3	0	5	0	23	1
(Socialist Federal Republic of Yugoslavia) Vladica Popović	15	0	4	0	4	0	23	0
(Socialist Federal Republic of Yugoslavia) Dušan Maravić	15	3	3	1	0	0	18	4
(Socialist Federal Republic of Yugoslavia) Branko Milanović	0	0	0	0	7	1	7	1
(Socialist Federal Republic of Yugoslavia) Vojislav Srdić	0	0	0	0	3	0	3	0
Forwards
(Socialist Federal Republic of Yugoslavia) Bora Kostić	22	25	5	11	8	9	35	45
(Socialist Federal Republic of Yugoslavia) Antun Rudinski	17	7	5	2	0	0	22	9
(Socialist Federal Republic of Yugoslavia) Ivan Popović	10	6	1	0	5	0	16	6
(Socialist Federal Republic of Yugoslavia) Rajko Mitić	11	2	0	0	0	0	11	2
(Socialist Federal Republic of Yugoslavia) Selimir Milošević	3	1	0	0	7	2	10	3
(Socialist Federal Republic of Yugoslavia) Vladimir Nikolovski	2	0	2	2	0	0	4	2
(Socialist Federal Republic of Yugoslavia) Ivan Toplak	1	0	0	0	0	0	1	0

== Results ==
=== Yugoslav First League ===
Pos	Team	Pld	W	D	L	GF	GA	GD	Pts	Qualification or relegation
1	Red Star Belgrade (C)	22	14	3	5	50	19	+31	31	Qualification for European Cup preliminary round
2	Partizan	22	14	3	5	39	29	+10	31	
3	Vojvodina	22	13	4	5	47	22	+25	30	
4	Radnički Beograd	22	9	4	9	35	27	+8	22	
5	Dinamo Zagreb	22	9	4	9	35	28	+7	22	

Source: rsssf.org
Rules for classification: 1) points; 2) goal difference; 3) number of goals scored.
(C) Champions

Date	Opponent	Venue	Result	Scorers
31 August 1958	Vardar	H	3–2	Kostić (2), Milošević
7 September 1958	Hajduk Split	H	7–0	Rudinski, Kostić (3), Mitić (2), Šekularac
21 September 1958	Željezničar	A	2–1	Kostić (2)
28 September 1958	Dinamo Zagreb	H	4–0	Rudinski (3), Kostić
12 October 1958	Radnički Beograd	A	1–4	Kostić
19 October 1958	Vojvodina	H	2–0	Kostić (2)
26 October 1958	Partizan	A	2–0	Kostić (2)
2 November 1958	Rijeka	H	3–0	Kostić, Stipić (2)
9 November 1958	Sarajevo	A	0–1	
15 November 1958	Budućnost	H	5–0	I. Popović (3), Kostić (2)
23 November 1958	Velež	A	3–1	Kostić, I. Popović (2)
15 March 1959	Vardar	A	0–1	
22 March 1959	Hajduk Split	A	1–4	Ilić (o.g.)
29 March 1959	Željezničar	H	1–0	I. Popović
5 April 1959	Dinamo Zagreb	A	0–0	
12 April 1959	Radnički Beograd	H	0–0	
3 May 1959	Vojvodina	A	0–0	
10 May 1959	Partizan	H	1–3	Maravić
17 May 1959	Rijeka	A	3–0	Maravić, Kostić, Šekularac
7 June 1959	Sarajevo	H	3–1	Tasić, Kostić (2)
14 June 1959	Budućnost	A	5–1	Kostić (4), Rudinski
21 June 1959	Velež	H	4–0	Rudinski (2), Kostić, Maravić

=== Yugoslav Cup ===
Date	Opponent	Venue	Result	Scorers
7 December 1958	Elektrostroj	H	4–1	Kostić (3), Nikolovski
14 December 1958	Radnički Sombor	A	5–2	Kostić (2), Nikolovski, Rudinski (2)
8 March 1959	Lokomotiva	H	2–1	Kostić (2)
8 April 1959	Rijeka	A	2–0	Kostić (2)
23 May 1959	Partizan	H	3–1	Maravić, Kostić (2)

=== Danube Cup ===
Date	Opponent	Venue	Result	Scorers
25 May 1958	Dukla Pardubice	H	2–0	Kostić, Borozan
1 June 1958	Dukla Pardubice	A	0–0	
8 June 1958	Lokomotiv Sofia	A	4–4	Kostić (4)
15 June 1958	Lokomotiv Sofia	H	1–0	Kostić
22 June 1958	Radnički Beograd	A	2–1	Stipić (2)
28 June 1958	Radnički Beograd	H	0–0	
6 July 1958	Rudá Hvězda Brno	H	4–1	Milošević, Kostić (2), Milanović
12 July 1958	Rudá Hvězda Brno	A	3–2	Kostić, Šekularac, Milošević

== See also ==
- List of Red Star Belgrade seasons
