= 1967–68 Red Star Belgrade season =

Red Star Belgrade
1967–68 season
- Chairman: Dušan Blagojević (until 22 January); Nikola Bugarčić (from 29 January)
- Manager: Miljan Miljanić
- Yugoslav First League: 1st
- Yugoslav Cup: Winners
- Mitropa Cup: Winners
- Top goalscorer: League: Vojin Lazarević (21); All: Vojin Lazarević (31)

During the 1967–68 season, Red Star Belgrade participated in the 1967–68 Yugoslav First League, 1967–68 Yugoslav Cup and 1967–68 Mitropa Cup.

== Season summary ==
Red Star won their third double in this season. On 23 November 1967, promising Red Star player Dejan Bekić died after long battle with cancer in the lymph nodes.

== Squad ==
Name	Yugoslav First League		Yugoslav Cup		Mitropa Cup		Total	
Name	Apps	Goals	Apps	Goals	Apps	Goals	Apps	Goals
Goalkeepers
(Socialist Federal Republic of Yugoslavia) Ratomir Dujković	28	0	5	0	5	0	38	0
(Socialist Federal Republic of Yugoslavia) Dragomir Racić	3	0	0	0	3	0	6	0
Defenders
(Socialist Federal Republic of Yugoslavia) Kiril Dojčinovski	30	1	5	1	7	0	42	2
(Socialist Federal Republic of Yugoslavia) Miroslav Pavlović	30	1	5	0	5	0	40	1
(Socialist Federal Republic of Yugoslavia) Milovan Đorić	26	2	2	0	6	0	34	2
(Socialist Federal Republic of Yugoslavia) Branko Klenkovski	17	2	4	0	6	0	27	2
(Socialist Federal Republic of Yugoslavia) Tomislav Milićević	13	0	1	0	2	0	16	0
(Socialist Federal Republic of Yugoslavia) Živorad Jevtić	13	0	2	0	0	0	15	0
(Socialist Federal Republic of Yugoslavia) Slobodan Škrbić	10	0	2	0	2	0	14	0
(Socialist Federal Republic of Yugoslavia) Aleksandar Marković	8	0	1	0	3	0	12	0
(Socialist Federal Republic of Yugoslavia) Petar Krivokuća	0	0	4	0	6	0	10	0
(Socialist Federal Republic of Yugoslavia) Sava Karapandžić	7	0	0	0	1	0	8	0
Midfielders
(Socialist Federal Republic of Yugoslavia) Zoran Antonijević	29	4	3	0	8	1	40	5
(Socialist Federal Republic of Yugoslavia) Dragan Džajić	27	12	4	4	4	4	35	20
(Socialist Federal Republic of Yugoslavia) Jovan Aćimović	24	3	5	2	5	0	34	5
(Socialist Federal Republic of Yugoslavia) Živan Rakić	10	0	0	0	1	0	11	0
(Socialist Federal Republic of Yugoslavia) Stevan Kovačević	0	0	0	0	1	1	1	1
Forwards
(Socialist Federal Republic of Yugoslavia) Stevan Ostojić	30	15	5	5	8	4	43	24
(Socialist Federal Republic of Yugoslavia) Vojin Lazarević	29	21	5	5	7	5	41	31
(Socialist Federal Republic of Yugoslavia) Trifun Mihailović	11	2	2	0	3	1	16	3
Mitropa Cup guest players
(Socialist Federal Republic of Yugoslavia) Blagomir Krivokuća	0	0	0	0	2	0	2	0
(Socialist Federal Republic of Yugoslavia) Rudolf Belin	0	0	0	0	1	0	1	0
(Socialist Federal Republic of Yugoslavia) Dragoslav Stepanović	0	0	0	0	1	0	1	0
(Socialist Federal Republic of Yugoslavia) Tomislav Prosen	0	0	0	0	1	0	1	0
(Socialist Federal Republic of Yugoslavia) Josip Bukal	0	0	0	0	1	0	1	0

== Results ==
=== Yugoslav First League ===
Pos	Team	Pld	W	D	L	GF	GA	GD	Pts	Qualification
1	Red Star Belgrade (C)	30	16	11	3	64	30	+34	43	Qualification for European Cup first round
2	Partizan	30	15	8	7	45	31	+14	38	
3	Dinamo Zagreb	30	12	11	7	45	33	+12	35	Invitation for Inter-Cities Fairs Cup first round
4	Hajduk Split	30	12	10	8	44	37	+7	34	
5	Željezničar	30	12	9	9	44	34	+10	33	

Source: rsssf.org
Rules for classification: 1) points; 2) goal difference; 3) number of goals scored.
(C) Champions

Date	Opponent	Venue	Result	Scorers
20 August 1967	Dinamo Zagreb	H	2–2	Džajić, Lazarević
27 August 1967	Hajduk Split	H	3–2	Lazarević (2), Ostojić
3 September 1967	Olimpija	A	0–0	
10 September 1967	Željezničar	H	2–0	Ostojić, Lazarević
17 September 1967	Velež	A	0–0	
24 September 1967	Vardar	H	1–1	Ostojić
12 October 1967	Proleter Zrenjanin	A	0–2	
15 October 1967	Zagreb	H	5–2	Lazarević (4), Ostojić
22 October 1967	Partizan	A	0–1	
29 October 1967	OFK Beograd	H	6–0	Ostojić (2), Antonijević, Džajić (2), Lazarević (pen.)
5 November 1967	Maribor	A	2–2	Klenkovski, Ostojić
19 November 1967	Sarajevo	H	1–0	Džajić
26 November 1967	Radnički Niš	A	1–0	Džajić
3 December 1967	Rijeka	H	2–0	Džajić, Lazarević
10 December 1967	Vojvodina	A	2–2	Lazarević, Pavlović
10 March 1968	Dinamo Zagreb	A	0–2	
17 March 1968	Hajduk Split	A	1–1	Klenkovski
24 March 1968	Olimpija	H	6–1	Mihailović (2), Lazarević, Ostojić (2), Antonijević
31 March 1968	Željezničar	A	2–1	Đorić, Lazarević
14 April 1968	Velež	H	4–0	Džajić, Ostojić, Antonijević (2)
17 April 1968	Vardar	A	2–0	Lazarević, Džajić
1 May 1968	Proleter Zrenjanin	H	1–1	Dojčinovski
5 May 1968	Zagreb	A	3–2	Ostojić (2), Džajić
12 May 1968	Partizan	H	2–2	Džajić, Aćimović
19 May 1968	OFK Beograd	A	1–1	Ostojić
26 May 1968	Maribor	H	6–1	Džajić (2), Lazarević (3), Fuček (o.g.)
16 June 1968	Sarajevo	A	1–1	Aćimović
19 June 1968	Radnički Niš	H	3–2	Ostojić (2), Lazarević
23 June 1968	Rijeka	A	3–1	Lazarević (2), Đorić
30 June 1968	Vojvodina	H	2–0	Lazarević, Aćimović

=== Yugoslav Cup ===
Date	Opponent	Venue	Result	Scorers
30 November 1967	Spartak Subotica	A	3–0	Ostojić (2), Lazarević
3 March 1968	Zagreb	H	3–1	Aćimović, Dojčinovski, Lazarević
20 March 1968	Borovo	A	2–0	Džajić (2)
10 April 1968	Maribor	H	2–1	Lazarević, Aćimović
22 May 1968	Bor	H	7–0	Ostojić (3), Džajić (2), Lazarević (2)

=== Mitropa Cup ===
Date	Opponent	Venue	Result	Scorers
15 November 1967	Diósgyőri VTK	H	3–0	Džajić (3)
22 November 1967	Diósgyőri VTK	A	1–3	Džajić
27 March 1968	Inter Bratislava	H	3–0	Ostojić (2), Kovačević
3 April 1968	Inter Bratislava	A	2–3	Ostojić, Lazarević
29 May 1968	Újpesti Dózsa	A	0–1	
6 June 1968	Újpesti Dózsa	H	4–1	Lazarević (2), E. Dunai (o.g.), Mihailović
16 October 1968	Spartak Trnava	A	0–1	
23 October 1968	Spartak Trnava	H	4–1	Lazarević (2), Ostojić, Antonijević

== See also ==
- List of Red Star Belgrade seasons
