= 1968–69 Red Star Belgrade season =

Red Star Belgrade
1968–69 season
- Chairman: Nikola Bugarčić
- Manager: Miljan Miljanić
- Yugoslav First League: 1st
- Yugoslav Cup: Semi-finals
- European Cup: Second round
- Mitropa Cup: Quarter-finals
- Top goalscorer: League: Vojin Lazarević (22); All: Vojin Lazarević (29)

During the 1968–69 season, Red Star Belgrade participated in the 1968–69 Yugoslav First League, 1968–69 Yugoslav Cup, 1968–69 European Cup and 1968–69 Mitropa Cup.

== Season summary ==
Red Star beat Partizan 6–1 in the 43rd Eternal derby, which remains their biggest victory in the meetings between the two sides.

17 November 1968	Red Star Belgrade	6–1	Partizan	Red Star Stadium, Belgrade
	Ostojić 15', 21', 60'; Pavlović 48'; Antonijević 51'; Džajić 87'		Katić 24'	Attendance: 25,000; Referee: Aleksandar Škorić

== Squad ==
Name	Yugoslav First League		Yugoslav Cup		European Cup		Mitropa Cup		Total	
Name	Apps	Goals	Apps	Goals	Apps	Goals	Apps	Goals	Apps	Goals
Goalkeepers
(Socialist Federal Republic of Yugoslavia) Ratomir Dujković	31	0	3	0	2	0	3	0	39	0
(Socialist Federal Republic of Yugoslavia) Dragomir Racić	3	0	1	0	0	0	1	0	5	0
(Socialist Federal Republic of Yugoslavia) Boško Kajganić	0	0	0	0	0	0	1	0	1	0
Defenders
(Socialist Federal Republic of Yugoslavia) Milovan Đorić	34	3	4	0	2	0	3	0	43	3
(Socialist Federal Republic of Yugoslavia) Kiril Dojčinovski	33	2	4	0	2	0	4	1	43	3
(Socialist Federal Republic of Yugoslavia) Miroslav Pavlović	32	1	4	0	2	0	4	0	42	1
(Socialist Federal Republic of Yugoslavia) Branko Klenkovski	32	3	3	0	2	0	3	0	40	3
(Socialist Federal Republic of Yugoslavia) Petar Krivokuća	21	2	3	0	2	0	3	0	29	2
(Socialist Federal Republic of Yugoslavia) Živorad Jevtić	22	0	3	0	0	0	1	0	26	0
(Socialist Federal Republic of Yugoslavia) Aleksandar Marković	10	0	0	0	0	0	1	0	11	0
(Socialist Federal Republic of Yugoslavia) Sava Karapandžić	4	0	1	0	1	0	1	0	7	0
Midfielders
(Socialist Federal Republic of Yugoslavia) Dragan Džajić	33	16	4	3	2	0	3	2	42	21
(Socialist Federal Republic of Yugoslavia) Zoran Antonijević	30	5	4	1	2	0	4	1	40	7
(Socialist Federal Republic of Yugoslavia) Jovan Aćimović	31	3	3	1	2	0	4	0	40	4
(Socialist Federal Republic of Yugoslavia) Slobodan Janković	3	0	1	0	0	0	2	0	6	0
(Socialist Federal Republic of Yugoslavia) Dragoljub Živković	0	0	0	0	0	0	2	0	2	0
(Socialist Federal Republic of Yugoslavia) Dojčin Perazić	1	0	0	0	0	0	0	0	1	0
(Socialist Federal Republic of Yugoslavia) Rade Radić	1	0	0	0	0	0	0	0	1	0
Forwards
(Socialist Federal Republic of Yugoslavia) Vojin Lazarević	34	22	4	3	2	1	4	3	44	29
(Socialist Federal Republic of Yugoslavia) Stevan Ostojić	32	17	4	2	2	1	4	3	42	23
(Socialist Federal Republic of Yugoslavia) Trifun Mihailović	2	0	0	0	1	0	2	1	5	1
(Socialist Federal Republic of Yugoslavia) Stanislav Karasi	1	0	0	0	0	0	0	0	1	0

== Results ==
=== Yugoslav First League ===
Pos	Team	Pld	W	D	L	GF	GA	GD	Pts	Qualification or relegation
1	Red Star Belgrade (C)	34	18	12	4	75	30	+45	48	Qualification for European Cup first round
2	Dinamo Zagreb	34	20	5	9	75	33	+42	45	Qualification for Cup Winners' Cup first round
3	Partizan	34	13	14	7	55	40	+15	40	Invitation for Inter-Cities Fairs Cup first round
4	Vojvodina	34	15	9	10	42	44	−2	39	Invitation for Inter-Cities Fairs Cup first round
5	Željezničar	34	15	8	11	51	38	+13	38	

Source: rsssf.org
Rules for classification: 1) points; 2) goal difference; 3) number of goals scored.
(C) Champions

Date	Opponent	Venue	Result	Scorers
18 August 1968	Velež	H	1–1	Džajić
25 August 1968	Čelik	A	1–1	Krivokuća
1 September 1968	Vardar	H	3–0	Ostojić, Lazarević (2)
8 September 1968	Dinamo Zagreb	A	0–2	
14 September 1968	Vojvodina	H	3–0	Aćimović, Ostojić, Lazarević
22 September 1968	Sarajevo	H	1–2	Ostojić
29 September 1968	Radnički Niš	A	1–2	Lazarević
6 October 1968	Olimpija	H	6–0	Lazarević (3), Dojčinovski, Ostojić, Klenkovski (pen.)
9 October 1968	Proleter Zrenjanin	A	0–0	
20 October 1968	Bor	H	2–0	Klenkovski (pen.), Antonijević
30 October 1968	Hajduk Split	A	1–1	Ostojić
3 November 1968	OFK Beograd	H	2–0	Ostojić (2)
10 November 1968	Zagreb	A	1–1	Džajić
17 November 1968	Partizan	H	6–1	Ostojić (3), Pavlović, Antonijević, Džajić
24 November 1968	Željezničar	A	2–2	Džajić (2)
1 December 1968	Maribor	H	8–1	Antonijević, Lazarević (3), Ostojić, Dojčinovski, Đorić, Džajić
8 December 1968	Rijeka	A	2–0	Aćimović, Džajić
9 March 1969	Velež	A	1–1	Ostojić
15 March 1969	Čelik	H	3–1	Lazarević, Antonijević, Đorić
23 March 1969	Vardar	A	1–1	Ostojić
30 March 1969	Dinamo Zagreb	H	1–3	Džajić
6 April 1969	Vojvodina	A	2–0	Džajić, Aćimović
13 April 1969	Sarajevo	A	4–1	Lazarević, Muzurović (o.g.), Džajić (2)
20 April 1969	Radnički Niš	H	2–0	Ostojić, Džajić
4 May 1969	Olimpija	A	1–0	Džajić
8 May 1969	Proleter Zrenjanin	H	2–0	Klenkovski, Lazarević
15 May 1969	Bor	A	4–1	Ostojić (2), Lazarević, Džajić
18 May 1969	Hajduk Split	H	3–3	Lazarević (2), Džajić
25 May 1969	OFK Beograd	A	2–0	Krivokuća, Džajić
6 June 1969	Zagreb	H	3–0	Lazarević, Bubanj (o.g.), Đorić
15 June 1969	Partizan	A	2–2	Lazarević (2)
22 June 1969	Željezničar	H	1–1	Lazarević
29 June 1969	Maribor	A	1–1	Antonijević
6 July 1969	Rijeka	H	2–1	Ostojić, Lazarević

=== Yugoslav Cup ===
Date	Opponent	Venue	Result	Scorers
4 December 1968	Crvenka	A	4–1	Ostojić, Lazarević, Aćimović, Džajić
2 March 1969	Borovo	A	2–0	Džajić, Ostojić
12 March 1969	Napredak Kruševac	H	4–0	Lazarević (2), Džajić, Antonijević
16 April 1969	Hajduk Split	A	0–1	

=== European Cup ===
==== Second round ====
13 November 1968	Celtic (Scotland)	5–1	(Socialist Federal Republic of Yugoslavia) Red Star Belgrade	Celtic Park, Glasgow
	Murdoch 3'; Johnstone 47', 82'; Lennox 50'; Wallace 75'	Report	Lazarević 39'	Attendance: 65,000; Referee: Alfred Ott (West Germany)

27 November 1968	Red Star Belgrade (Socialist Federal Republic of Yugoslavia)	1–1	(Scotland) Celtic	Red Star Stadium, Belgrade
	Ostojić 89'	Report	Wallace 82'	Attendance: 35,000; Referee: Francesco Francescon (Italy)

=== Mitropa Cup ===
Date	Opponent	Venue	Result	Scorers
11 December 1968	Atalanta	A	4–2	Džajić (2), Lazarević, Ostojić
29 December 1968	Atalanta	H	5–1	Antonijević, Lazarević (2), Ostojić, Mihailović
26 March 1969	Vasas	H	1–2	Vidáts (o.g.)
2 April 1969	Vasas	A	2–3	Dojčinovski, Ostojić

== See also ==
- List of Red Star Belgrade seasons
