= 1970–71 Red Star Belgrade season =

Red Star Belgrade
1970–71 season
- Chairman: Nikola Bugarčić
- Manager: Miljan Miljanić
- Yugoslav First League: 6th
- Yugoslav Cup: Winners
- European Cup: Semi-finals
- Top goalscorer: League: Zoran Filipović (18); All: Zoran Filipović (31)

During the 1970–71 season, Red Star Belgrade participated in the 1970–71 Yugoslav First League, 1970–71 Yugoslav Cup and 1970–71 European Cup.

== Season summary ==
Red Star were eliminated by Panathinaikos in the semi-finals of the European Cup. In the Yugoslav Cup final, Red Star defeated Sloboda Tuzla 6–0 on aggregate.

== Squad ==
Name	Yugoslav First League		Yugoslav Cup		European Cup		Total	
Name	Apps	Goals	Apps	Goals	Apps	Goals	Apps	Goals
Goalkeepers
(Socialist Federal Republic of Yugoslavia) Ratomir Dujković	31	0	6	0	8	0	45	0
(Socialist Federal Republic of Yugoslavia) Boško Kajganić	5	0	0	0	0	0	5	0
Defenders
(Socialist Federal Republic of Yugoslavia) Vladislav Bogićević	30	0	6	0	7	0	43	0
(Socialist Federal Republic of Yugoslavia) Petar Krivokuća	29	0	2	0	4	0	35	0
(Socialist Federal Republic of Yugoslavia) Milovan Đorić	22	0	4	1	8	1	34	2
(Socialist Federal Republic of Yugoslavia) Branko Klenkovski	21	0	4	0	4	0	29	0
(Socialist Federal Republic of Yugoslavia) Miroslav Pavlović	13	0	5	0	4	0	22	0
(Socialist Federal Republic of Yugoslavia) Kiril Dojčinovski	16	0	1	0	4	0	21	0
(Socialist Federal Republic of Yugoslavia) Mihalj Keri	12	0	1	0	1	0	14	0
(Socialist Federal Republic of Yugoslavia) Sava Karapandžić	6	0	2	0	1	0	9	0
(Socialist Federal Republic of Yugoslavia) Branko Radović	5	0	1	0	0	0	6	0
(Socialist Federal Republic of Yugoslavia) Aleksandar Marković	2	0	0	0	0	0	2	0
Midfielders
(Socialist Federal Republic of Yugoslavia) Dragan Džajić	29	12	6	6	5	2	40	20
(Socialist Federal Republic of Yugoslavia) Zoran Antonijević	30	2	5	0	5	0	40	2
(Socialist Federal Republic of Yugoslavia) Jovan Aćimović	26	4	5	0	8	1	39	5
(Socialist Federal Republic of Yugoslavia) Slobodan Janković	21	5	5	2	6	3	32	10
(Socialist Federal Republic of Yugoslavia) Mile Novković	22	0	4	0	6	0	32	0
(Socialist Federal Republic of Yugoslavia) Dušan Nikolić	1	0	0	0	0	0	1	0
Forwards
(Socialist Federal Republic of Yugoslavia) Stanislav Karasi	26	11	5	1	6	1	37	13
(Socialist Federal Republic of Yugoslavia) Zoran Filipović	23	18	6	7	7	6	36	31
(Socialist Federal Republic of Yugoslavia) Stevan Ostojić	17	5	4	0	7	6	28	11
(Socialist Federal Republic of Yugoslavia) Trifun Mihailović	9	1	1	0	2	0	12	1
(Socialist Federal Republic of Yugoslavia) Aleksandar Panajotović	8	4	1	0	0	0	9	4
(Socialist Federal Republic of Yugoslavia) Sead Sušić	1	0	0	0	0	0	1	0

== Results ==
=== Yugoslav First League ===
Pos	Team	Pld	W	D	L	GF	GA	GD	Pts	Qualification or relegation
4	OFK Belgrade	34	15	8	11	54	44	+10	38	Qualification for UEFA Cup first round
5	Partizan	34	14	10	10	44	34	+10	38	
6	Red Star Belgrade	34	14	8	12	62	46	+16	36	Qualification for Cup Winners' Cup first round
7	Olimpija	34	13	10	11	47	35	+12	36	
8	Velež	34	14	8	12	52	48	+4	36	

Source: rsssf.org
Rules for classification: 1) points; 2) goal difference; 3) number of goals scored.

Date	Opponent	Venue	Result	Scorers
23 August 1970	Maribor	H	1–0	Džajić
26 August 1970	Crvenka	A	0–1	
30 August 1970	Radnički Niš	H	1–2	Karasi
6 September 1970	Dinamo Zagreb	A	0–0	
13 September 1970	OFK Beograd	H	3–3	Aćimović, Karasi, Džajić
20 September 1970	Sloboda Tuzla	A	1–1	Filipović
23 September 1970	Radnički Kragujevac	H	3–1	Aćimović, Ostojić, Filipović
27 September 1970	Željezničar	A	0–0	
4 October 1970	Velež	H	2–1	Ostojić (2)
18 October 1970	Borac Banja Luka	A	1–1	Džajić
24 October 1970	Vojvodina	H	2–0	Filipović, Džajić
31 October 1970	Bor	H	1–0	Filipović
8 November 1970	Hajduk Split	A	2–4	Džajić (2)
15 November 1970	Partizan	H	1–2	Filipović
22 November 1970	Olimpija	A	2–4	Filipović, Džajić
29 November 1970	Čelik	H	5–0	Aćimović, Filipović, Karasi (2), Janković
6 December 1970	Sarajevo	A	1–3	Filipović
7 March 1971	Maribor	A	1–1	Filipović
14 March 1971	Crvenka	H	4–0	Filipović (2), Karasi, Ostojić
21 March 1971	Radnički Niš	A	3–0	Džajić, Antonijević, Panajotović
28 March 1971	Dinamo Zagreb	H	0–2	
11 April 1971	OFK Beograd	A	1–2	Panajotović
17 April 1971	Sloboda Tuzla	H	2–2	Filipović, Antonijević
25 April 1971	Radnički Kragujevac	A	2–0	Panajotović, Mihailović
2 May 1971	Željezničar	H	1–4	Filipović
16 May 1971	Velež	A	2–3	Džajić, Filipović
20 May 1971	Borac Banja Luka	H	5–0	Karasi (2), Džajić (2), Filipović
23 May 1971	Vojvodina	A	4–1	Janković (2), Filipović, Aćimović
30 May 1971	Bor	A	4–2	Filipović (2), Janković, Karasi
2 June 1971	Hajduk Split	H	1–1	Karasi
6 June 1971	Partizan	A	2–0	Karasi, Džajić
12 June 1971	Olimpija	H	0–1	
20 June 1971	Čelik	A	0–2	
27 June 1971	Sarajevo	H	4–2	Janković, Karasi, Ostojić, Panajotović

=== Yugoslav Cup ===
Date	Opponent	Venue	Result	Scorers
11 November 1970	Spartak Subotica	A	3–1	Filipović, Džajić (2)
28 February 1971	Vojvodina	H	2–0	Đorić, Džajić
17 March 1971	Bor	H	2–0	Janković, Filipović
7 April 1971	Velež	H	4–0	Filipović (3), Džajić
12 May 1971	Sloboda Tuzla	A	4–0	Džajić (2), Filipović, Karasi
26 May 1971	Sloboda Tuzla	H	2–0	Janković, Filipović

=== European Cup ===
==== First round ====
16 September 1970	Újpest (Hungary)	2–0	(Socialist Federal Republic of Yugoslavia) Red Star Belgrade	Szusza Ferenc Stadion, Budapest
	Nagy 52'; A. Dunai 81'	Report		Attendance: 10,000; Referee: Todor Betchirov (Bulgaria)

30 September 1970	Red Star Belgrade (Socialist Federal Republic of Yugoslavia)	4–0	(Hungary) Újpest	Red Star Stadium, Belgrade
	Filipović 6', 58'; Džajić 25'; Ostojić 44'	Report		Attendance: 50,000; Referee: Pavel Kazakov (Soviet Union)

==== Second round ====
21 October 1970	Red Star Belgrade (Socialist Federal Republic of Yugoslavia)	3–0	(Romania) UTA Arad	Red Star Stadium, Belgrade
	Filipović 17'; Aćimović 50'; Ostojić 54'	Report		Attendance: 25,000; Referee: Janusz Eksztjan (Poland)

4 November 1970	UTA Arad (Romania)	1–3	(Socialist Federal Republic of Yugoslavia) Red Star Belgrade	Stadionul Francisc von Neuman, Arad
	Brosovszky 56'	Report	Filipović 51', 67'; Janković 78'	Attendance: 20,000; Referee: Kevin Howley (England)

==== Quarter-finals ====
10 March 1971	Carl Zeiss Jena (East Germany)	3–2	(Socialist Federal Republic of Yugoslavia) Red Star Belgrade	Ernst-Abbe-Sportfeld, Jena
	Strempel 16'; Ducke 21'; Irmscher 84'	Report	Janković 42'; Džajić 57'	Attendance: 13,000; Referee: John Carpenter (Republic of Ireland)

24 March 1971	Red Star Belgrade (Socialist Federal Republic of Yugoslavia)	4–0	(East Germany) Carl Zeiss Jena	Red Star Stadium, Belgrade
	Đorić 14' (pen.); Filipović 30'; Ostojić 60'; Karasi 78'	Report		Attendance: 88,000; Referee: Cornel Nitescu (Romania)

==== Semi-finals ====
14 April 1971	Red Star Belgrade (Socialist Federal Republic of Yugoslavia)	4–1	(Greece) Panathinaikos	Red Star Stadium, Belgrade
	Ostojić 15', 46', 70'; Janković 39'	Report	Kamaras 55'	Attendance: 93,500; Referee: Erich Linemayr (Austria)

28 April 1971	Panathinaikos (Greece)	3–0	(Socialist Federal Republic of Yugoslavia) Red Star Belgrade	Leoforos Alexandras Stadium, Athens
	Antoniadis 1', 54'; Kamaras 65'	Report		Attendance: 25,000; Referee: José María Ortiz de Mendíbil (Spain)

== See also ==
- List of Red Star Belgrade seasons
