= 1969–70 Red Star Belgrade season =

Red Star Belgrade
1969–70 season
- Chairman: Nikola Bugarčić
- Manager: Miljan Miljanić
- Yugoslav First League: 1st
- Yugoslav Cup: Winners
- Yugoslav Super Cup: Winners
- European Cup: Second round
- Top goalscorer: League: Dragan Džajić (13); All: Dragan Džajić (19)

During the 1969–70 season, Red Star Belgrade participated in the 1969–70 Yugoslav First League, 1969–70 Yugoslav Cup, 1969 Yugoslav Super Cup and 1969–70 European Cup.

== Season summary ==
Red Star won the inaugural Yugoslav Super Cup and their fourth double in this season.

On 10 September 1969, Red Star played a friendly match against Santos.

| 10 September 1969 | Red Star Belgrade (Socialist Federal Republic of Yugoslavia) | 3–3 | (Brazil) Santos | Red Star Stadium, Belgrade |
| | Lazarević 3', 65', 70' | | Edu 6', 37'; Pelé 27' | Attendance: 70,000; Referee: Konstantin Zečević |

== Squad ==
| Name | Yugoslav First League | | Yugoslav Cup | | Yugoslav Super Cup | | European Cup | | Total | |
| Name | Apps | Goals | Apps | Goals | Apps | Goals | Apps | Goals | Apps | Goals |
|---|---|---|---|---|---|---|---|---|---|---|
Goalkeepers
| (Socialist Federal Republic of Yugoslavia) Ratomir Dujković | 33 | 0 | 6 | 0 | 1 | 0 | 3 | 0 | 43 | 0 |
| (Socialist Federal Republic of Yugoslavia) Dragomir Racić | 0 | 0 | 0 | 0 | 1 | 0 | 1 | 0 | 2 | 0 |
| (Socialist Federal Republic of Yugoslavia) Ognjen Petrović | 1 | 0 | 0 | 0 | 0 | 0 | 0 | 0 | 1 | 0 |
Defenders
| (Socialist Federal Republic of Yugoslavia) Kiril Dojčinovski | 30 | 0 | 6 | 0 | 1 | 0 | 4 | 0 | 41 | 0 |
| (Socialist Federal Republic of Yugoslavia) Branko Klenkovski | 30 | 2 | 6 | 1 | 2 | 0 | 2 | 1 | 40 | 4 |
| (Socialist Federal Republic of Yugoslavia) Milovan Đorić | 30 | 1 | 5 | 0 | 2 | 0 | 3 | 0 | 40 | 1 |
| (Socialist Federal Republic of Yugoslavia) Miroslav Pavlović | 29 | 0 | 3 | 0 | 2 | 0 | 4 | 0 | 38 | 0 |
| (Socialist Federal Republic of Yugoslavia) Petar Krivokuća | 20 | 2 | 3 | 0 | 2 | 0 | 4 | 0 | 29 | 2 |
| (Socialist Federal Republic of Yugoslavia) Živorad Jevtić | 14 | 2 | 2 | 0 | 0 | 0 | 3 | 0 | 19 | 2 |
| (Socialist Federal Republic of Yugoslavia) Mihalj Keri | 13 | 0 | 3 | 0 | 0 | 0 | 1 | 0 | 17 | 0 |
| (Socialist Federal Republic of Yugoslavia) Sava Karapandžić | 14 | 0 | 2 | 0 | 0 | 0 | 0 | 0 | 16 | 0 |
| (Socialist Federal Republic of Yugoslavia) Slobodan Škrbić | 4 | 0 | 0 | 0 | 0 | 0 | 0 | 0 | 4 | 0 |
| (Socialist Federal Republic of Yugoslavia) Branko Radović | 1 | 0 | 0 | 0 | 0 | 0 | 0 | 0 | 1 | 0 |
Midfielders
| (Socialist Federal Republic of Yugoslavia) Zoran Antonijević | 34 | 3 | 6 | 0 | 2 | 1 | 4 | 5 | 46 | 9 |
| (Socialist Federal Republic of Yugoslavia) Dragan Džajić | 30 | 13 | 6 | 3 | 2 | 1 | 4 | 2 | 42 | 19 |
| (Socialist Federal Republic of Yugoslavia) Jovan Aćimović | 16 | 4 | 3 | 1 | 2 | 1 | 4 | 2 | 25 | 8 |
| (Socialist Federal Republic of Yugoslavia) Mile Novković | 1 | 0 | 0 | 0 | 0 | 0 | 0 | 0 | 1 | 0 |
| (Socialist Federal Republic of Yugoslavia) Milovan Mitić | 1 | 0 | 0 | 0 | 0 | 0 | 0 | 0 | 1 | 0 |
Forwards
| (Socialist Federal Republic of Yugoslavia) Stanislav Karasi | 31 | 10 | 5 | 0 | 2 | 0 | 4 | 5 | 42 | 15 |
| (Socialist Federal Republic of Yugoslavia) Vojin Lazarević | 26 | 12 | 6 | 2 | 2 | 2 | 2 | 1 | 36 | 17 |
| (Socialist Federal Republic of Yugoslavia) Trifun Mihailović | 18 | 8 | 4 | 1 | 0 | 0 | 0 | 0 | 22 | 9 |
| (Socialist Federal Republic of Yugoslavia) Stevan Ostojić | 15 | 6 | 1 | 0 | 2 | 0 | 2 | 0 | 20 | 6 |
| (Socialist Federal Republic of Yugoslavia) Milan Arnejčič | 13 | 3 | 0 | 0 | 0 | 0 | 3 | 0 | 16 | 3 |

== Results ==
=== Yugoslav First League ===
| Pos | Team | Pld | W | D | L | GF | GA | GD | Pts | Qualification or relegation |
|---|---|---|---|---|---|---|---|---|---|---|
| 1 | Red Star Belgrade (C) | 34 | 20 | 6 | 8 | 67 | 37 | +30 | 46 | Qualification for European Cup first round |
| 2 | Partizan | 34 | 16 | 12 | 6 | 47 | 27 | +20 | 44 | Invitation for Inter-Cities Fairs Cup first round |
| 3 | Velež | 34 | 17 | 9 | 8 | 64 | 44 | +20 | 43 | |
| 4 | Željezničar | 34 | 17 | 9 | 8 | 52 | 33 | +19 | 43 | Invitation for Inter-Cities Fairs Cup first round |
| 5 | OFK Belgrade | 34 | 13 | 12 | 9 | 53 | 32 | +21 | 38 | |

Source: rsssf.org
Rules for classification: 1) points; 2) goal difference; 3) number of goals scored.
(C) Champions

| Date | Opponent | Venue | Result | Scorers |
|---|---|---|---|---|
| 24 August 1969 | Vardar | A | 2–3 | Lazarević, Aćimović |
| 31 August 1969 | Velež | H | 5–0 | Karasi (2), Lazarević, Šestić (o.g.), Ostojić |
| 7 September 1969 | Bor | A | 2–2 | Krivokuća, Ostojić |
| 14 September 1969 | OFK Beograd | H | 3–1 | Krivokuća, Karasi, Lazarević |
| 21 September 1969 | Čelik | A | 2–3 | Džajić, Karasi |
| 28 September 1969 | Hajduk Split | A | 0–0 | |
| 5 October 1969 | Maribor | H | 3–1 | Džajić, Ostojić (2) |
| 8 October 1969 | Zagreb | A | 2–0 | Ostojić, Aćimović |
| 11 October 1969 | Sarajevo | H | 3–0 | Ostojić, Arnejčič, Džajić |
| 26 October 1969 | Olimpija | A | 2–1 | Klenkovski (pen.), Džajić |
| 2 November 1969 | Vojvodina | H | 2–0 | Arnejčič, Karasi |
| 9 November 1969 | Radnički Kragujevac | A | 1–0 | Arnejčič |
| 16 November 1969 | Sloboda Tuzla | H | 3–1 | Antonijević (2), Aćimović |
| 23 November 1969 | Partizan | A | 3–1 | Jevtić, Aćimović, Džajić |
| 30 November 1969 | Radnički Niš | H | 2–0 | Lazarević, Karasi |
| 7 December 1969 | Dinamo Zagreb | A | 0–2 | |
| 14 December 1969 | Željezničar | H | 1–4 | Jevtić |
| 8 March 1970 | Vardar | H | 3–0 | Karasi, Džajić, Klenkovski (pen.) |
| 16 March 1970 | Velež | A | 0–1 | |
| 22 March 1970 | Bor | H | 5–3 | Lazarević (2), Mihailović (2), Džajić |
| 28 March 1970 | OFK Beograd | A | 2–4 | Mihailović, Džajić |
| 5 April 1970 | Čelik | H | 3–0 | Mihailović (2), Džajić |
| 19 April 1970 | Hajduk Split | H | 1–0 | Mihailović |
| 26 April 1970 | Maribor | A | 1–0 | Džajić |
| 29 April 1970 | Zagreb | H | 3–0 | Karasi, Lazarević (2) |
| 3 May 1970 | Sarajevo | A | 0–0 | |
| 9 May 1970 | Olimpija | H | 3–0 | Karasi, Mihailović, Lazarević |
| 17 May 1970 | Vojvodina | A | 0–1 | |
| 23 May 1970 | Radnički Kragujevac | H | 2–1 | Antonijević, Džajić |
| 31 May 1970 | Sloboda Tuzla | A | 3–1 | Džajić, Lazarević (2) |
| 7 June 1970 | Partizan | H | 1–1 | Đorić |
| 14 June 1970 | Radnički Niš | A | 1–1 | Karasi |
| 21 June 1970 | Dinamo Zagreb | H | 2–2 | Lazarević, Mihailović |
| 28 June 1970 | Željezničar | A | 1–3 | Džajić |

=== Yugoslav Cup ===
| Date | Opponent | Venue | Result | Scorers |
|---|---|---|---|---|
| 23 October 1969 | Mačva | A | 1–0 | Džajić |
| 1 March 1970 | Željezničar | H | 1–0 | Aćimović |
| 11 March 1970 | OFK Beograd | A | 1–0 | Klenkovski (pen.) |
| 1 April 1970 | Radnički Niš | H | 2–0 | Lazarević, Džajić |
| 19 May 1970 | Olimpija | A | 2–2 | Lazarević, Mihailović |
| 27 May 1970 | Olimpija | H | 1–0 (a.e.t.) | Džajić |

=== Yugoslav Super Cup ===
| Date | Opponent | Venue | Result | Scorers |
|---|---|---|---|---|
| 20 August 1969 | Dinamo Zagreb | H | 4–1 | Valec (o.g.), Antonijević, Lazarević, Aćimović |
| 27 August 1969 | Dinamo Zagreb | A | 2–1 | Džajić, Lazarević |

=== European Cup ===
==== First round ====
| 17 September 1969 | Red Star Belgrade (Socialist Federal Republic of Yugoslavia) | 8–0 | (Northern Ireland) Linfield | Red Star Stadium, Belgrade |
| | Karasi 5', 30', 35'; Lazarević 9'; Klenkovski 25'; Aćimović 70'; Džajić 71', 81' | Report | | Attendance: 20,000; Referee: Michalakis Kiriakides (Cyprus) |

| 1 October 1969 | Linfield (Northern Ireland) | 2–4 | (Socialist Federal Republic of Yugoslavia) Red Star Belgrade | Windsor Park, Belfast |
| | McGraw 19', 36' | Report | Antonijević 44', 67', 72', 75' | Attendance: 10,000; Referee: Kaj Rasmussen (Denmark) |

==== Second round ====
| 12 November 1969 | Vorwärts Berlin (East Germany) | 2–1 | (Socialist Federal Republic of Yugoslavia) Red Star Belgrade | Friedrich-Ludwig-Jahn-Sportpark, Berlin |
| | Fräßdorf 31'; Begerad 67' | Report | Antonijević 15' | Attendance: 10,000; Referee: Tiny Wharton (Scotland) |

| 26 November 1969 | Red Star Belgrade (Socialist Federal Republic of Yugoslavia) | 3–2 | (East Germany) Vorwärts Berlin | Red Star Stadium, Belgrade |
| | Karasi 35', 64'; Aćimović 60' | Report | Begerad 12', 56' | Attendance: 12,000; Referee: Joseph Franciscus Dorpmans (Netherlands) |

== See also ==
- List of Red Star Belgrade seasons
