= 1989–90 Red Star Belgrade season =

Football season

Red Star Belgrade
1989–90 season
- Chairman: Svetozar Mijailović
- Manager: Dragoslav Šekularac
- Yugoslav First League: 1st
- Yugoslav Cup: Winners
- UEFA Cup: Third round
- Top goalscorer: League: Darko Pančev (25); All: Darko Pančev (35)

During the 1989–90 season, Red Star Belgrade participated in the 1989–90 Yugoslav First League, 1989–90 Yugoslav Cup and 1989–90 UEFA Cup.

== Season summary ==
Red Star won their fifth double in this season. The season was marred by Dinamo–Red Star riot in the penultimate round of Yugoslav First League.

On 28 January 1990, Miodrag Belodedici made his Red Star debut in a friendly match against his former club Steaua București.

28 January 1990	Red Star Belgrade (Socialist Federal Republic of Yugoslavia)	4–1	(Romania) Steaua București	Red Star Stadium, Belgrade
	Prosinečki 42'; Pančev 67'; Najdoski 71'; Adžić 86'		Dumitrescu 89'	Attendance: 20,000; Referee: Zdravko Jokić

== Squad ==
Name	Yugoslav First League		Yugoslav Cup		UEFA Cup		Total	
Name	Apps	Goals	Apps	Goals	Apps	Goals	Apps	Goals
Goalkeepers
(Socialist Federal Republic of Yugoslavia) Stevan Stojanović	29	0	8	0	5	0	42	0
(Socialist Federal Republic of Yugoslavia) Zvonko Milojević	4	0	0	0	1	0	5	0
Defenders
(Socialist Federal Republic of Yugoslavia) Ilija Najdoski	29	1	8	0	5	0	42	1
(Socialist Federal Republic of Yugoslavia) Slobodan Marović	27	2	7	0	6	0	40	2
(Socialist Federal Republic of Yugoslavia) Duško Radinović	29	2	7	2	2	0	38	4
(Socialist Federal Republic of Yugoslavia) Goran Jurić	21	0	7	0	6	0	34	0
(Romania) Miodrag Belodedici	14	1	3	0	0	0	17	1
(Socialist Federal Republic of Yugoslavia) Zoran Vujović	15	0	2	0	0	0	17	0
(Socialist Federal Republic of Yugoslavia) Refik Šabanadžović	10	0	3	1	0	0	13	1
Midfielders
(Socialist Federal Republic of Yugoslavia) Robert Prosinečki	31	5	8	3	6	1	45	9
(Socialist Federal Republic of Yugoslavia) Dragan Stojković	31	10	6	1	6	0	43	11
(Socialist Federal Republic of Yugoslavia) Dragi Kanatlarovski	29	1	6	1	6	1	41	3
(Socialist Federal Republic of Yugoslavia) Dejan Savićević	25	10	7	4	6	3	38	17
(Socialist Federal Republic of Yugoslavia) Vlada Stošić	24	4	7	2	5	0	36	6
(Socialist Federal Republic of Yugoslavia) Mitar Mrkela	23	2	5	4	4	1	32	7
(Socialist Federal Republic of Yugoslavia) Ivan Adžić	1	0	0	0	0	0	1	0
Forwards
(Socialist Federal Republic of Yugoslavia) Darko Pančev	32	25	8	8	5	2	45	35
(Socialist Federal Republic of Yugoslavia) Vladan Lukić	25	10	2	1	6	1	33	12
Players sold or loaned out during the season
(Socialist Federal Republic of Yugoslavia) Slavko Radovanović	0	0	0	0	1	0	1	0
(Socialist Federal Republic of Yugoslavia) Miloš Drizić	11	1	1	0	6	1	18	2
(Socialist Federal Republic of Yugoslavia) Slavoljub Janković	2	0	2	0	0	0	4	0
(Socialist Federal Republic of Yugoslavia) Zoran Pavlović	2	0	0	0	0	0	2	0
(Socialist Federal Republic of Yugoslavia) Zoran Dimitrijević	2	0	0	0	0	0	2	0
(Socialist Federal Republic of Yugoslavia) Vladimir Jugović	1	0	0	0	0	0	1	0
(Socialist Federal Republic of Yugoslavia) Ljubiša Milojević	0	0	1	0	0	0	1	0

== Results ==
=== Yugoslav First League ===
Pos	Team	Pld	W	PKW	PKL	L	GF	GA	GD	Pts	Qualification or relegation
1	Red Star Belgrade (C)	34	24	3	2	5	79	29	+50	51	Qualification for European Cup first round
2	Dinamo Zagreb	34	16	8	3	7	53	25	+28	40	Qualification for UEFA Cup first round
3	Hajduk Split	34	18	2	1	13	50	35	+15	38	Banned from European competition (Note: In November 1987, UEFA banned Hajduk Split from European competitions for two seasons. The immediate catalyst for the punishment was crowd trouble during club's 1987–88 European Cup Winners' Cup match against Marseille on 5 November 1987, however, repeated prior incidents at Hajduk's European home matches throughout early-to-mid 1980s (such as the 1983–84 UEFA Cup semifinal first leg infamous 'rooster incident' against Tottenham Hotspur) also contributed to the decision. Since Hajduk's 1987–88 Yugoslav League performance failed to qualify the club for 1988–89 European competition, the punishment was enacted for seasons when Hajduk did manage to qualify: 1989–90 and 1990–91.)
4	Partizan	34	18	1	3	12	51	42	+9	37	Qualification for UEFA Cup first round
5	Rad	34	16	4	2	12	41	31	+10	36	

Source: rsssf.org
Rules for classification: 1) points; 2) goal difference; 3) number of goals scored.
(C) Champion
Notes:

Date	Opponent	Venue	Result	Scorers
30 July 1989	Sloboda Tuzla	H	6–1	Pančev (2), Kanatlarovski, Mrkela, Radinović, Stojković (pen.)
6 August 1989	Vojvodina	A	1–2	Marović
13 August 1989	Vardar	H	5–2	Stojković (pen.), Savićević, Lukić, Pančev (2)
20 August 1989	Željezničar	A	0–3	
27 August 1989	Osijek	H	3–1	Radinović, Pančev, Savićević
9 September 1989	Hajduk Split	A	1–2	Prosinečki
17 September 1989	Partizan	H	1–0	Lukić
23 September 1989	Radnički Niš	A	3–1	Pančev, Lukić, Stojković
1 October 1989	Borac Banja Luka	H	3–0	Pančev (2), Lukić
7 October 1989	Rijeka	A	4–1	Savićević, Pančev, Drizić, Rubčić (o.g.)
14 October 1989	Budućnost	H	5–1	Pančev, Savićević (2), Lukić (2)
22 October 1989	Sarajevo	A	1–3	Lukić
5 November 1989	Rad	H	4–2	Marović, Stojković (2), Pančev
11 November 1989	Olimpija	A	1–1 (5–6 p)	Stošić
26 November 1989	Dinamo Zagreb	H	0–0 (2–3 p)	
2 December 1989	Spartak Subotica	A	3–1	Pančev, Stojković, Lukić
10 December 1989	Sloboda Tuzla	A	0–3	
17 December 1989	Vojvodina	H	3–1	Pančev (3)
20 December 1989	Velež	H	4–0	Stojković (2), Najdoski, Stošić
18 February 1990	Vardar	A	2–0	Stošić, Pančev
25 February 1990	Željezničar	H	2–2 (4–3 p)	Lukić, Pančev
4 March 1990	Osijek	A	5–0	Pančev (2), Lukić, Prosinečki, Miličević (o.g.)
11 March 1990	Hajduk Split	H	2–1	Stošić, Pančev
16 March 1990	Partizan	A	2–0	Pančev, Prosinečki
25 March 1990	Radnički Niš	H	1–0	Savićević
1 April 1990	Borac Banja Luka	A	0–0 (5–4 p)	
8 April 1990	Rijeka	H	1–0	Mrkela
15 April 1990	Budućnost	A	0–0 (4–2 p)	
22 April 1990	Sarajevo	H	3–0	Pančev, Prosinečki, Savićević (pen.)
25 April 1990	Rad	A	2–1	Stojković, Savićević
29 April 1990	Olimpija	H	2–0	Stojković (pen.), Pančev
6 May 1990	Velež	A	3–0	Savićević, Pančev, Belodedici
13 May 1990	Dinamo Zagreb	A	3–0 (f)	
16 May 1990	Spartak Subotica	H	3–0	Pančev, Prosinečki, Savićević

=== Yugoslav Cup ===
Date	Opponent	Venue	Result	Scorers
2 August 1989	Liria	H	8–2	Mrkela (3), Kanatlarovski, Stojković, Pančev (3)
9 August 1989	Vojvodina	H	6–0	Radinović, Savićević, Pančev (2), Prosinečki, Mrkela
16 August 1989	Vojvodina	A	1–1	Lukić
25 October 1989	Budućnost	H	5–1	Savićević (2), Prosinečki, Pančev, Stošić
8 November 1989	Budućnost	A	3–0	Radinović, Savićević, Stošić
18 April 1990	Partizan	H	1–0	Pančev
2 May 1990	Partizan	A	3–2	Prosinečki, Šabanadžović, Spasić (o.g.)
19 May 1990	Hajduk Split	N	1–0	Pančev

=== UEFA Cup ===
==== First round ====
14 September 1989	Galatasaray (Turkey)	1–1	(Socialist Federal Republic of Yugoslavia) Red Star Belgrade	Ali Sami Yen Stadium, Istanbul
	Vezir 35'	Report	Mrkela 12'	Attendance: 45,000; Referee: Alphonse Constantin (Belgium)

27 September 1989	Red Star Belgrade (Socialist Federal Republic of Yugoslavia)	2–0	(Turkey) Galatasaray	Red Star Stadium, Belgrade
	Lukić 3'; Pančev 67'	Report		Attendance: 65,000; Referee: Joaquín Ramos Marcos (Spain)

==== Second round ====
18 October 1989	Red Star Belgrade (Socialist Federal Republic of Yugoslavia)	4–1	(Soviet Union) Žalgiris	Red Star Stadium, Belgrade
	Savićević 29'; Kanatlarovski 31'; Pančev 33'; Drizić 55'	Report	Ivanauskas 66'	Attendance: 70,000; Referee: Vassilios Nikakis (Greece)

1 November 1989	Žalgiris (Soviet Union)	0–1	(Socialist Federal Republic of Yugoslavia) Red Star Belgrade	Žalgiris Stadium, Vilnius
		Report	Prosinečki 70'	Attendance: 12,000; Referee: Lajos Hartmann (Hungary)

==== Third round ====
22 November 1989	Red Star Belgrade (Socialist Federal Republic of Yugoslavia)	2–0	(West Germany) Köln	Red Star Stadium, Belgrade
	Savićević 76', 80'	Report		Attendance: 80,000; Referee: Gérard Biguet (France)

6 December 1989	Köln (West Germany)	3–0	(Socialist Federal Republic of Yugoslavia) Red Star Belgrade	Müngersdorfer Stadion, Cologne
	Götz 58', 82'; Ordenewitz 89'	Report		Attendance: 40,000; Referee: Jozef Marko (Czechoslovakia)

== See also ==
- List of Red Star Belgrade seasons
