= 1999–2000 Red Star Belgrade season =

Red Star Belgrade
1999–2000 season
- Chairman: Dragan Džajić
- Manager: Miloljub Ostojić (until 16 September); Slavoljub Muslin (from 20 September)
- First League of FR Yugoslavia: 1st
- FR Yugoslavia Cup: Winners
- UEFA Cup: First round
- Top goalscorer: League: Mihajlo Pjanović (22); All: Mihajlo Pjanović (25)

During the 1999–2000 season, Red Star Belgrade participated in the 1999–2000 First League of FR Yugoslavia, 1999–2000 FR Yugoslavia Cup and 1999–2000 UEFA Cup.

== Season summary ==
Red Star won their seventh double in this season. The 17-year-old Red Star fan Aleksandar Radović was killed by a signaling rocket fired from Partizan fans during the 113th Eternal derby.

On 7 August 1999, Red Star played a friendly match against Real Madrid.

7 August 1999	Real Madrid (Spain)	2–1	(Federal Republic of Yugoslavia) Red Star Belgrade	Estadio Municipal, La Línea de la Concepción
	Morientes 21'; Hierro 33'		Pjanović 43'

== Squad ==
Name	First League of FR Yugoslavia		FR Yugoslavia Cup		UEFA Cup		Total	
Name	Apps	Goals	Apps	Goals	Apps	Goals	Apps	Goals
Goalkeepers
(Federal Republic of Yugoslavia) Aleksandar Kocić	39	0	5	0	4	0	48	0
(Federal Republic of Yugoslavia) Dejan Pešić	1	0	0	0	0	0	1	0
Defenders
(Federal Republic of Yugoslavia) Goran Bunjevčević	40	7	5	0	4	0	49	7
(Federal Republic of Yugoslavia) Ivan Dudić	38	0	4	0	4	0	46	0
(Federal Republic of Yugoslavia) Ivan Gvozdenović	34	1	5	1	0	0	39	2
(Federal Republic of Yugoslavia) Stevo Glogovac	24	0	3	0	3	0	30	0
(Federal Republic of Yugoslavia) Ivan Vukomanović	23	0	4	1	1	0	28	1
(Federal Republic of Yugoslavia) Milivoje Vitakić	19	0	3	0	4	0	26	0
(Federal Republic of Yugoslavia) Nenad Lalatović	14	0	3	0	0	0	17	0
(Federal Republic of Yugoslavia) Marjan Marković	8	2	0	0	0	0	8	2
Midfielders
(Federal Republic of Yugoslavia) Branko Bošković	31	9	3	1	4	2	38	12
(Federal Republic of Yugoslavia) Jovan Gojković	30	7	3	1	4	0	37	8
(Federal Republic of Yugoslavia) Dejan Ilić	32	2	2	1	3	0	37	3
(Federal Republic of Yugoslavia) Leo Lerinc	25	2	3	1	2	0	30	3
(North Macedonia) Blaže Georgioski	25	3	3	1	1	0	29	4
(Federal Republic of Yugoslavia) Srđan Bajčetić	23	1	3	0	3	0	29	1
(Slovenia) Milenko Ačimovič	21	4	3	1	4	0	28	5
(Federal Republic of Yugoslavia) Nenad Miljković	3	0	1	0	0	0	4	0
Forwards
(Federal Republic of Yugoslavia) Mihajlo Pjanović	27	22	4	2	4	1	35	25
(Federal Republic of Yugoslavia) Branko Jelić	18	7	2	3	2	1	22	11
(Federal Republic of Yugoslavia) Dragan Stevanović	15	6	2	0	0	0	17	6
(Federal Republic of Yugoslavia) Vlado Mirković	14	3	1	0	0	0	15	3
(Federal Republic of Yugoslavia) Dragan Mićić	7	0	2	1	2	0	11	1
(Federal Republic of Yugoslavia) Boban Stojanović	7	0	1	0	0	0	8	0
(Federal Republic of Yugoslavia) Goran Drulić	6	0	1	0	0	0	7	0
Players sold or loaned out during the season
(Federal Republic of Yugoslavia) Miodrag Pantelić	19	6	1	0	4	2	24	8
(Federal Republic of Yugoslavia) Nikoslav Bjegović	12	0	2	0	2	0	16	0
(Federal Republic of Yugoslavia) Dalibor Škorić	2	0	1	0	0	0	3	0

== Results ==
=== Overview ===
Competition	Record							
Competition	P	W	D	L	GF	GA	GD	Win %
First League of FR Yugoslavia	40	33	6	1	85	19	+66	82.50
FR Yugoslavia Cup	5	5	0	0	14	0	+14	100.00
UEFA Cup	4	2	1	1	6	5	+1	50.00
Total	49	40	7	2	105	24	+81	81.63

=== First League of FR Yugoslavia ===
Pos	Team	Pld	W	D	L	GF	GA	GD	Pts	Qualification or relegation
1	Red Star Belgrade (C)	40	33	6	1	85	19	+66	105	Qualification for Champions League first qualifying round
2	Partizan	40	32	5	3	111	30	+81	101	Qualification for UEFA Cup qualifying round
3	Obilić	40	28	5	7	71	32	+39	89	Qualification for Intertoto Cup first round
4	Rad	40	17	9	14	56	46	+10	60	
5	Sutjeska	40	17	9	14	50	50	0	60	

Source: RSSSF.org
Rules for classification: 1) points; 2) goal difference; 3) number of goals scored.
Napredak Kruševac from Second League qualify for 2000–01 UEFA Cup as runner-up of 1999–2000 FR Yugoslavia Cup.
(C) Champions

Date	Opponent	Venue	Result	Scorers
31 July 1999	Borac Čačak	A	2–2	Gojković, Bunjevčević
21 August 1999	Železnik	H	0–0	
10 September 1999	Zemun	A	4–0	Jelić, Bošković (2), Pantelić
18 September 1999	Budućnost	H	3–0	Bošković, Pjanović (pen.), Ačimovič
22 September 1999	Rad	A	1–1	Pjanović (pen.)
25 September 1999	OFK Beograd	H	3–1	Gojković, Bunjevčević, Jelić
2 October 1999	Radnički Kragujevac	A	1–1	Pantelić
13 October 1999	Spartak Subotica	H	4–0	Pantelić (2), Gvozdenović, Gojković
16 October 1999	Radnički Niš	A	2–1	Gojković, Pantelić
23 October 1999	Sutjeska Nikšić	H	5–0	Bošković, Pjanović (2), Bunjevčević, Jelić
30 October 1999	Partizan	A	0–2	
3 November 1999	Čukarički	H	1–0	Pjanović
6 November 1999	Hajduk Beograd	A	3–0	Pjanović (2), Jelić
20 November 1999	Proleter Zrenjanin	H	4–0	Pjanović (2), Jelić, Bunjevčević
27 November 1999	Vojvodina	A	2–1	Bunjevčević (2)
1 December 1999	Hajduk Kula	H	2–0	Ačimovič (pen.), Mirković
4 December 1999	Obilić	A	1–1	Bunjevčević
11 December 1999	Mogren	H	2–0	Jelić, Pantelić (pen.)
15 December 1999	Sartid	A	2–1	Gojković, Jelić
18 December 1999	Milicionar	H	3–2	Bošković, Ačimovič (2)
12 February 2000	Borac Čačak	H	4–0	Pjanović, Lerinc, Ćosić (o.g.), Mirković
19 February 2000	Železnik	A	3–1	Pjanović (2), Ilić
26 February 2000	Zemun	H	1–1	Bošković (pen.)
1 March 2000	Budućnost	A	2–0	Georgioski, Stevanović
4 March 2000	Rad	H	1–0	Pjanović
11 March 2000	OFK Beograd	A	2–1	Georgioski, Stevanović
15 March 2000	Radnički Kragujevac	H	1–0	Gojković
18 March 2000	Spartak Subotica	A	2–0	Stevanović (2)
22 March 2000	Radnički Niš	H	1–0	Bošković
25 March 2000	Sutjeska Nikšić	A	1–0	Stevanović
2 April 2000	Partizan	H	2–1	Pjanović, Savić (o.g.)
8 April 2000	Čukarički	A	1–0	Lerinc
15 April 2000	Hajduk Beograd	H	3–0	Bošković, Gojković, Mirković
22 April 2000	Proleter Zrenjanin	A	1–0	Pjanović
29 April 2000	Vojvodina	H	4–0	Marković, Stevanović, Ilić, Gojković
3 May 2000	Hajduk Kula	A	3–1	Pjanović (2), Georgioski
6 May 2000	Obilić	H	2–0	Pjanović (2)
13 May 2000	Mogren	A	2–0	Pjanović (pen.), Bošković
17 May 2000	Sartid	H	2–0	Pjanović (2)
20 May 2000	Milicionar	A	2–1	Marković, Bajčetić

=== FR Yugoslavia Cup ===
Date	Opponent	Venue	Result	Scorers
24 November 1999	Bor	A	3–0	Jelić, Gvozdenović, Ačimovič
8 December 1999	Sartid	A	3–0	Jelić (2), Gojković (pen.)
5 April 2000	Radnički Kragujevac	H	1–0	Mićić
19 April 2000	Milicionar	A	3–0	Lerinc, Bošković, Georgioski
10 May 2000	Napredak Kruševac	H	4–0	Pjanović (2), Ilić, Vukomanović

=== UEFA Cup ===
==== Qualifying round ====
12 August 1999	Neftçi (Azerbaijan)	2–3	(Federal Republic of Yugoslavia) Red Star Belgrade	Tofiq Bahramov Republican Stadium, Baku
	Vasilyev 27', 65'	Report	Bošković 68'; Pjanović 69'; Pantelić 70'	Attendance: 6,000; Referee: Jonny Ditlefsen (Norway)

26 August 1999	Red Star Belgrade (Federal Republic of Yugoslavia)	1–0	(Azerbaijan) Neftçi	Red Star Stadium, Belgrade
	Pantelić 76'	Report		Attendance: 10,000; Referee: Dominique Tavel (Switzerland)

==== First round ====
14 September 1999	Red Star Belgrade (Federal Republic of Yugoslavia)	0–1	(France) Montpellier	Georgi Asparuhov Stadium, Sofia
		Report	Loko 6'	Attendance: 8,000; Referee: Dermot Gallagher (England)

28 September 1999	Montpellier (France)	2–2	(Federal Republic of Yugoslavia) Red Star Belgrade	Stade de la Mosson, Montpellier
	Ouédec 34'; Delaye 52'	Report	Jelić 48'; Bošković 55'	Attendance: 9,246; Referee: Livio Bazzoli (Italy)

== See also ==
- List of Red Star Belgrade seasons
