= 2000–01 Red Star Belgrade season =

Red Star Belgrade
2000–01 season
- Chairman: Dragan Džajić
- Manager: Slavoljub Muslin
- First League of FR Yugoslavia: 1st
- FR Yugoslavia Cup: Runners-up
- UEFA Champions League: Third qualifying round
- UEFA Cup: Second round
- Top goalscorer: League: Mihajlo Pjanović (23); All: Goran Drulić (27)

During the 2000–01 season, Red Star Belgrade participated in the 2000–01 First League of FR Yugoslavia, 2000–01 FR Yugoslavia Cup, 2000–01 UEFA Champions League qualifying rounds and 2000–01 UEFA Cup.

== Squad ==
Name	First League of FR Yugoslavia		FR Yugoslavia Cup		UEFA Champions League		UEFA Cup		Total	
Name	Apps	Goals	Apps	Goals	Apps	Goals	Apps	Goals	Apps	Goals
Goalkeepers
(Federal Republic of Yugoslavia) Aleksandar Kocić	33	0	5	0	6	0	4	0	48	0
(Federal Republic of Yugoslavia) Dejan Pešić	1	0	0	0	0	0	0	0	1	0
Defenders
(Federal Republic of Yugoslavia) Ivan Gvozdenović	31	3	5	1	6	0	3	1	45	5
(Federal Republic of Yugoslavia) Goran Bunjevčević	33	0	4	1	4	0	4	0	45	1
(Federal Republic of Yugoslavia) Marjan Marković	29	1	4	0	6	0	4	0	43	1
(Federal Republic of Yugoslavia) Nenad Lalatović	24	4	2	0	5	0	4	0	35	4
(Federal Republic of Yugoslavia) Stevo Glogovac	24	3	3	0	5	0	3	0	35	3
(Federal Republic of Yugoslavia) Milivoje Vitakić	20	0	5	0	2	0	3	0	30	0
(Federal Republic of Yugoslavia) Ivan Vukomanović	13	0	1	0	0	0	0	0	14	0
(Federal Republic of Yugoslavia) Vladimir Matijašević	9	0	4	0	0	0	0	0	13	0
(Federal Republic of Yugoslavia) Petar Đenić	3	0	2	0	0	0	0	0	5	0
Midfielders
(Federal Republic of Yugoslavia) Branko Bošković	32	9	2	0	6	3	4	0	44	12
(Federal Republic of Yugoslavia) Leo Lerinc	28	4	4	0	5	0	4	0	41	4
(Slovenia) Milenko Ačimovič	28	14	5	3	2	0	4	1	39	18
(Federal Republic of Yugoslavia) Dejan Ilić	26	2	3	1	5	1	3	0	37	4
(Federal Republic of Yugoslavia) Saša Zorić	22	1	2	0	3	0	3	0	30	1
Forwards
(Federal Republic of Yugoslavia) Goran Drulić	33	16	5	2	6	3	4	6	48	27
(Federal Republic of Yugoslavia) Mihajlo Pjanović	29	23	4	0	3	1	4	0	40	24
(Federal Republic of Yugoslavia) Dragan Stevanović	10	2	1	0	6	1	1	0	18	3
(Federal Republic of Yugoslavia) Branko Jelić	14	6	2	0	0	0	0	0	16	6
(Federal Republic of Yugoslavia) Vlado Mirković	9	3	1	0	2	1	0	0	12	4
Players sold or loaned out during the season
(North Macedonia) Blaže Georgioski	2	0	1	0	3	0	0	0	6	0
(Federal Republic of Yugoslavia) Nenad Miljković	0	0	1	0	0	0	0	0	1	0
(Federal Republic of Yugoslavia) Boban Stojanović	0	0	1	0	0	0	0	0	1	0
(Federal Republic of Yugoslavia) Srđan Bajčetić	13	2	1	0	6	0	4	0	24	2
(Federal Republic of Yugoslavia) Jovan Markoski	5	0	1	0	2	0	0	0	8	0

== Results ==
=== Overview ===
Competition	Record							
Competition	P	W	D	L	GF	GA	GD	Win %
First League of FR Yugoslavia	34	28	4	2	93	20	+73	82.35
FR Yugoslavia Cup	5	3	1	1	8	4	+4	60.00
UEFA Champions League	6	3	2	1	10	3	+7	50.00
UEFA Cup	4	2	1	1	8	7	+1	50.00
Total	49	36	8	5	119	34	+85	73.47

=== First League of FR Yugoslavia ===
Pos	Team	Pld	W	D	L	GF	GA	GD	Pts	Qualification or relegation
1	Red Star Belgrade (C)	34	28	4	2	93	20	+73	88	Qualification for Champions League second qualifying round
2	Partizan	34	28	2	4	94	36	+58	86	Qualification for UEFA Cup qualifying round
3	Obilić	34	19	6	9	53	37	+16	63	Qualification for UEFA Cup qualifying round
4	Sartid	34	17	3	14	49	47	+2	54	Qualification for Intertoto Cup first round
5	OFK Beograd	34	15	5	14	52	45	+7	50	

Source: RSSSF.org
Rules for classification: 1) points; 2) goal difference; 3) number of goals scored.
(C) Champions

Date	Opponent	Venue	Result	Scorers
13 August 2000	Čukarički	H	1–0	Pjanović
18 August 2000	Zeta	H	3–0	Stevanović, Bošković, Gvozdenović
27 August 2000	Rad	A	3–1	Ačimovič, Pjanović (2)
9 September 2000	Sutjeska Nikšić	H	3–1	Lerinc, Ačimovič, Mirković
17 September 2000	Vojvodina	A	2–0	Stevanović, Pjanović
23 September 2000	OFK Beograd	H	4–0	Ačimovič, Pjanović (2), Drulić
1 October 2000	Zemun	A	1–1	Ačimovič
20 October 2000	Hajduk Kula	A	0–0	
29 October 2000	Radnički Niš	H	3–0	Glogovac, Ačimovič, Drulić
4 November 2000	Obilić	A	1–1	Pjanović
13 November 2000	Sartid	H	5–1	Gvozdenović, Bajčetić, Drulić, Pjanović (2)
18 November 2000	Budućnost	A	2–0	Pjanović (2)
25 November 2000	Radnički Kragujevac	H	4–0	Ačimovič (2), Drulić (2)
29 November 2000	Napredak Kruševac	A	2–1	Ačimovič, Lalatović
2 December 2000	Železnik	H	5–1	Drulić, Pjanović (2), Ačimovič (pen.), Glogovac
9 December 2000	Milicionar	A	3–0	Pjanović, Lerinc, Bajčetić
24 February 2001	Čukarički	A	4–0	Ačimovič (pen.), Drulić, Pjanović, Mirković
3 March 2001	Zeta	A	2–2	Pjanović, Bošković
7 March 2001	Partizan	H	2–0	Pjanović, Lalatović
10 March 2001	Rad	H	3–1	Bošković (pen.), Jelić (2)
14 March 2001	Sutjeska Nikšić	A	2–1	Jelić, Drulić
17 March 2001	Vojvodina	H	3–0	Bošković, Ilić, Drulić
31 March 2001	OFK Beograd	A	1–2	Drulić
7 April 2001	Zemun	H	2–1	Ilić, Drulić
14 April 2001	Partizan	A	1–2	Drulić
18 April 2001	Hajduk Kula	H	3–0	Ačimovič (pen.), Bošković, Pjanović
28 April 2001	Radnički Niš	A	2–0	Drulić, Pjanović (pen.)
4 May 2001	Obilić	H	4–0	Lalatović, Ačimovič, Pjanović, Bošković
12 May 2001	Sartid	A	3–0	Gvozdenović, Drulić, Jelić
19 May 2001	Budućnost	H	2–1	Bošković (2)
26 May 2001	Radnički Kragujevac	A	2–0	Marković, Drulić
9 June 2001	Napredak Kruševac	H	9–1	Pjanović, Lalatović, Drulić, Lerinc (2), Jelić (2), Ačimovič, Mirković
16 June 2001	Železnik	A	2–1	Ačimovič, Glogovac
20 June 2001	Milicionar	H	4–1	Pjanović (2), Bošković, Zorić (pen.)

=== FR Yugoslavia Cup ===
Date	Opponent	Venue	Result	Scorers
5 September 2000	Hajduk Beograd	A	1–0	Ačimovič (pen.)
22 November 2000	Sartid	H	3–0	Drulić, Ačimovič (pen.), Ilić
4 April 2001	Budućnost Banatski Dvor	A	1–1 (5–4 p)	Bunjevčević
11 April 2001	Mladost Apatin	H	3–2	Gvozdenović, Drulić, Ačimovič (pen.)
9 May 2001	Partizan	H	0–1	

=== UEFA Champions League ===
==== First qualifying round ====
12 July 2000	KÍ Klaksvík (Faroe Islands)	0–3	(Federal Republic of Yugoslavia) Red Star Belgrade	Svangaskarð, Toftir
		Report	Ilić 44'; Stevanović 68'; Mirković 90'	Attendance: 1,500; Referee: Kjell Alseth (Norway)

19 July 2000	Red Star Belgrade (Federal Republic of Yugoslavia)	2–0	(Faroe Islands) KÍ Klaksvík	Red Star Stadium, Belgrade
	Bošković 10' (pen.); Drulić 17'	Report		Attendance: 20,000; Referee: Zsolt Szabó (Hungary)

==== Second qualifying round ====
26 July 2000	Red Star Belgrade (Federal Republic of Yugoslavia)	4–0	(Georgia (country)) Torpedo Kutaisi	Red Star Stadium, Belgrade
	Drulić 24', 90'; Bošković 37'; Pjanović 39'	Report		Attendance: 30,000; Referee: Dietmar Drabek (Austria)

2 August 2000	Torpedo Kutaisi (Georgia (country))	2–0	(Federal Republic of Yugoslavia) Red Star Belgrade	Givi Kiladze Stadium, Kutaisi
	Imedadze 41'; Janashia 90'	Report		Attendance: 8,000; Referee: Uriah Rennie (England)

==== Third qualifying round ====
9 August 2000	Dynamo Kyiv (Ukraine)	0–0	(Federal Republic of Yugoslavia) Red Star Belgrade	Dynamo Stadium, Kyiv
		Report		Attendance: 20,000; Referee: Dermot Gallagher (England)

23 August 2000	Red Star Belgrade (Federal Republic of Yugoslavia)	1–1	(Ukraine) Dynamo Kyiv	Red Star Stadium, Belgrade
	Bošković 22'	Report	Byalkevich 33'	Attendance: 55,000; Referee: Kyros Vassaras (Greece)

=== UEFA Cup ===
==== First round ====
14 September 2000	Leicester City (England)	1–1	(Federal Republic of Yugoslavia) Red Star Belgrade	Filbert Street, Leicester
	Taggart 43'	Report	Ačimovič 2'	Attendance: 20,000; Referee: Tom Henning Øvrebø (Norway)

28 September 2000	Red Star Belgrade (Federal Republic of Yugoslavia)	3–1	(England) Leicester City	Gerhard Hanappi Stadium, Vienna
	Drulić 22', 71'; Gvozdenović 47'	Report	Izzet 42'	Attendance: 12,500; Referee: Pasquale Rodomonti (Italy)

==== Second round ====
26 October 2000	Red Star Belgrade (Federal Republic of Yugoslavia)	1–0	(Spain) Celta Vigo	Red Star Stadium, Belgrade
	Drulić 62'	Report		Attendance: 55,000; Referee: Eric Romain (Belgium)

9 November 2000	Celta Vigo (Spain)	5–3	(Federal Republic of Yugoslavia) Red Star Belgrade	Balaídos, Vigo
	Catanha 23', 70'; López 50' (pen.), 65' (pen.); McCarthy 55'	Report	Drulić 15', 38', 90'	Attendance: 20,000; Referee: Cosimo Bolognino (Italy)

Celta were awarded a 3–0 victory for the second leg as Red Star fielded ineligible players, therefore winning 3–1 on aggregate

== See also ==
- List of Red Star Belgrade seasons
