= 2003–04 Red Star Belgrade season =

Red Star Belgrade
2003–04 season
- Chairman: Dragan Džajić
- Manager: Slavoljub Muslin
- First League of Serbia and Montenegro: 1st
- Serbia and Montenegro Cup: Winners
- UEFA Cup: Second round
- Top goalscorer: League: Nikola Žigić (19); All: Nikola Žigić (27)

During the 2003–04 season, Red Star Belgrade participated in the 2003–04 First League of Serbia and Montenegro, 2003–04 Serbia and Montenegro Cup and 2003–04 UEFA Cup.

== Season summary ==
Red Star won their eighth double in this season.

== Squad ==
Name	First League of Serbia and Montenegro		Serbia and Montenegro Cup		UEFA Cup		Total	
Name	Apps	Goals	Apps	Goals	Apps	Goals	Apps	Goals
Goalkeepers
(Serbia and Montenegro) Vladimir Dišljenković	24	0	3	0	6	0	33	0
(Serbia and Montenegro) Ivan Ranđelović	6	0	2	0	0	0	8	0
Defenders
(Serbia and Montenegro) Dragan Šarac	29	1	5	0	5	0	39	1
(Serbia and Montenegro) Milan Dudić	23	3	5	1	5	0	33	4
(Serbia and Montenegro) Slavoljub Đorđević	23	0	4	0	5	0	32	0
(Serbia and Montenegro) Nemanja Vidić	20	5	4	0	6	3	30	8
(Serbia and Montenegro) Marjan Marković	18	1	3	0	5	0	26	1
(Serbia and Montenegro) Milivoje Vitakić	18	0	4	1	4	0	26	1
(Serbia and Montenegro) Bojan Miladinović	11	0	0	0	0	0	11	0
(France) Marko Muslin	2	0	1	0	0	0	3	0
Midfielders
(Serbia and Montenegro) Radovan Krivokapić	27	5	2	0	5	1	34	6
(Serbia and Montenegro) Dragan Mladenović	24	3	4	0	6	0	34	3
(Serbia and Montenegro) Marko Perović	25	3	4	1	3	1	32	5
(Serbia and Montenegro) Dejan Milovanović	21	0	4	0	3	0	28	0
(Sweden) Bojan Djordjic	18	0	2	0	5	1	25	1
(Serbia and Montenegro) Dejan Ilić	12	0	3	0	0	0	15	0
(Serbia and Montenegro) Nenad Kovačević	7	0	0	0	3	0	10	0
Forwards
(Serbia and Montenegro) Nikola Žigić	28	19	3	2	5	6	36	27
(Serbia and Montenegro) Nenad Stojanović	18	7	2	2	3	0	23	9
(Serbia and Montenegro) Dragan Bogavac	10	0	2	2	4	1	16	3
(Serbia and Montenegro) Marko Pantelić	12	5	3	1	0	0	15	6
(Serbia and Montenegro) Ivan Dudić	10	1	1	1	1	0	12	2
(Serbia and Montenegro) Sanibal Orahovac	8	2	1	0	2	0	11	2
Players sold or loaned out during the season
(Serbia and Montenegro) Branko Bošković	2	1	0	0	1	1	3	2
(Serbia and Montenegro) Dragan Mrđa	5	3	2	1	2	0	9	4
(Serbia and Montenegro) Boško Janković	4	0	2	0	1	0	7	0
(Bosnia and Herzegovina) Jadranko Bogičević	2	0	2	0	1	0	5	0
(Serbia and Montenegro) Nikola Beljić	3	0	1	0	0	0	4	0
(Serbia and Montenegro) Dušan Basta	1	0	1	0	0	0	2	0

== Results ==
=== Overview ===
Competition	Record							
Competition	P	W	D	L	GF	GA	GD	Win %
First League of Serbia and Montenegro	30	23	5	2	59	13	+46	76.67
Serbia and Montenegro Cup	5	5	0	0	12	0	+12	100.00
UEFA Cup	6	3	2	1	14	8	+6	50.00
Total	41	31	7	3	85	21	+64	75.61

=== First League of Serbia and Montenegro ===
Pos	Team	Pld	W	D	L	GF	GA	GD	Pts	Qualification or relegation
1	Red Star Belgrade (C)	30	23	5	2	59	13	+46	74	Qualification for Champions League second qualifying round
2	Partizan	30	19	6	5	48	20	+28	63	Qualification for UEFA Cup second qualifying round
3	Železnik	30	17	7	6	48	20	+28	58	Qualification for UEFA Cup second qualifying round
4	OFK Beograd	30	14	9	7	50	57	−7	51	Qualification for Intertoto Cup second round
5	Sartid	30	14	7	9	43	36	+7	49	Qualification for Intertoto Cup first round

Source: RSSSF.org
Rules for classification: 1) points; 2) goal difference; 3) number of goals scored.
(C) Champions

Date	Opponent	Venue	Result	Scorers
9 August 2003	Napredak Kruševac	A	1–2	Bošković
23 August 2003	Hajduk Kula	H	2–0	Žigić, Orahovac
31 August 2003	Zeta	A	1–1	Stojanović
13 September 2003	Kom	A	2–0	M. Dudić, Stojanović
20 September 2003	Radnički Obrenovac	H	3–0	Žigić (2), Mladenović
28 September 2003	Zemun	A	1–0	Vidić (pen.)
4 October 2003	Budućnost Banatski Dvor	H	4–0	Žigić (3), Vidić
19 October 2003	Železnik	A	2–0	Krivokapić, M. Dudić
25 October 2003	Borac Čačak	H	5–1	Orahovac, Mrđa (2), Krivokapić, Žigić
2 November 2003	Obilić	A	3–1	Žigić, Vidić (pen.), Mrđa
8 November 2003	Partizan	H	3–0	Žigić (2), Perović
23 November 2003	OFK Beograd	A	0–1	
30 November 2003	Sutjeska Nikšić	H	1–0	Žigić
6 December 2003	Vojvodina	A	2–0	Žigić (2)
13 December 2003	Sartid	H	1–0	M. Dudić
21 February 2004	Napredak Kruševac	H	2–0	Pantelić, Mladenović
29 February 2004	Hajduk Kula	A	2–1	Vidić (2 pen.)
7 March 2004	Zeta	H	4–0	Žigić (4)
13 March 2004	Kom	H	2–0	Mladenović, Krivokapić
17 March 2004	Radnički Obrenovac	A	0–0	
21 March 2004	Zemun	H	2–1	Pantelić, Stojanović
3 April 2004	Budućnost Banatski Dvor	A	2–0	Pantelić (2)
7 April 2004	Železnik	H	0–0	
10 April 2004	Borac Čačak	A	1–1	Stojanović
13 April 2004	Obilić	H	2–0	Perović, Žigić
17 April 2004	Partizan	A	0–0	
25 April 2004	OFK Beograd	H	2–1	Marković, I. Dudić
1 May 2004	Sutjeska Nikšić	A	1–0	Pantelić
8 May 2004	Vojvodina	H	3–0	Perović, Šarac, Žigić
15 May 2004	Sartid	A	5–3	Krivokapić (2), Stojanović (3)

=== Serbia and Montenegro Cup ===
Date	Opponent	Venue	Result	Scorers
11 November 2003	Car Konstantin	H	7–0	Bogavac (2), Vitakić, I. Dudić, Perović, M. Dudić, Mrđa
3 December 2003	Radnički Beograd	A	2–0	Stojanović (2)
3 March 2004	Železnik	H	1–0	Žigić
21 April 2004	Partizan	H	1–0	Pantelić
12 May 2004	Budućnost Banatski Dvor	N	1–0	Žigić

=== UEFA Cup ===
==== Qualifying round ====
14 August 2003	Red Star Belgrade (Serbia and Montenegro)	5–0	(Moldova) Nistru Otaci	Red Star Stadium, Belgrade
	Žigić 8', 20', 49'; Vidić 45' (pen.); Bošković 46'	Report		Attendance: 20,000; Referee: Peter Sippel (Germany)

28 August 2003	Nistru Otaci (Moldova)	2–3	(Serbia and Montenegro) Red Star Belgrade	Stadionul Republican, Chișinău
	Bursuc 27', 65'	Report	Bogavac 2'; Krivokapić 10'; Perović 87'	Attendance: 1,500; Referee: Wolfgang Sowa (Austria)

==== First round ====
24 September 2003	Odense (Denmark)	2–2	(Serbia and Montenegro) Red Star Belgrade	Odense Stadium, Odense
	Miti 17'; Borre 90+2'	Report	Žigić 22', 64'	Attendance: 7,000; Referee: Romans Lajuks (Latvia)

15 October 2003	Red Star Belgrade (Serbia and Montenegro)	4–3	(Denmark) Odense	Red Star Stadium, Belgrade
	Žigić 3'; Vidić 12', 86'; Djordjic 27'	Report	Stokholm 11'; Højer 39'; Lindrup 78'	Attendance: 35,000; Referee: Bertrand Layec (France)

==== Second round ====
29 October 2003	Rosenborg (Norway)	0–0	(Serbia and Montenegro) Red Star Belgrade	Lerkendal Stadion, Trondheim
		Report		Attendance: 12,632; Referee: Steve Bennett (England)

27 November 2003	Red Star Belgrade (Serbia and Montenegro)	0–1	(Norway) Rosenborg	Red Star Stadium, Belgrade
		Report	Brattbakk 50'	Attendance: 55,000; Referee: Paulo Costa (Portugal)

== See also ==
- List of Red Star Belgrade seasons
