= Ivan Toplak =

Yugoslav footballer (1931–2021)

Ivan Toplak Иван Toплaк
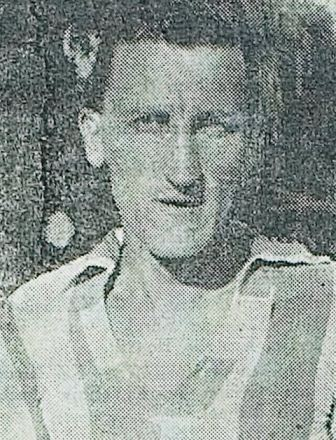

Personal information
- Date of birth: 21 September 1931
- Place of birth: Belgrade, Yugoslavia
- Date of death: 25 July 2021 (aged 89)
- Place of death: Maribor, Slovenia
- Position: Striker

Youth career
- 1945–1950: Branik Maribor

Senior career*
Years	Team	Apps	(Gls)
1951–1954	Olimpija Ljubljana	25	(14)
1954–1961	Red Star Belgrade	92	(48)
Total		117	(62)

International career
1956	Yugoslavia	1	(0)

Managerial career
- 1964–1966: Red Star Belgrade
- 1967–1968: California Clippers
- 1969–1971: Stanford University
- 1974–1975: San Jose Earthquakes
- 1976–1977: Yugoslavia
- 1978–1980: Yugoslavia U20
- 1978–1980: Yugoslavia U21
- 1984: Yugoslavia U23
- 1986: Yugoslavia (co-manager)
- 1991–1993: Indonesia
Medal record
As coach
Yugoslavia
Olympic Games
Bronze medal – third place	1984 Los Angeles	Team
- * Club domestic league appearances and goals

Ivan Toplak (Serbian Cyrillic: Иван Toплaк; 21 September 1931 – 25 July 2021) was a Serbian football player and manager. Toplak played for NK Olimpija Ljubljana and Red Star Belgrade, with whom he had much success. As a player he also represented the Yugoslavia national team. As a manager he also managed Red Star, had a managing period in the United States, managed almost all levels of the Yugoslavia national team and also managed the Indonesia national team.

At the 1984 Summer Olympics, he guided Yugoslavia to a bronze medal.

== Club career ==
Toplak started his career at NK Branik Maribor in Maribor, where his family moved in 1943 from Belgrade.

In 1951, he signed with NK Olimpija Ljubljana, where he spent playing the next three years.

With Olimpija, he won the Slovenian Republic League in 1952.

In 1954, Toplak left Olimpija for Red Star Belgrade. He played at Red Star for seven years, until 1961. With Red Star he won the Yugoslav First League in the seasons 1955–56, 1956–57, 1958–59, 1959–60. He had also won the Yugoslav Cup in the 1957–58 season and the 1958–59 season. On international club level, he won the Mitropa Cup in 1958.

He left Red Star in 1961 and shortly after retired from football at the age of 30.

== International career ==
Toplak earned one cap for the Yugoslavia national team in 1956, but did not score a goal in that game.

== Managerial career ==
In 1964, Toplak became the new manager of Red Star Belgrade in the Yugoslav First League. He managed the club for two years, but did not manage to win anything.

After Yugoslavia, he went to the USA in 1967, where he managed the California Clippers from 1967 to 1968, Stanford University from 1969 to 1971 and the San Jose Earthquakes from 1974 to 1975.

In 1976 he left the US and came back to Yugoslavia, where from 1976 to 1977, he was manager of the Yugoslavia national team.

After the A team, he managed the Yugoslavia U20 and Yugoslavia U21 sides, both at the same time from 1978 to 1980. He led the U21 side at the 1980 UEFA Euro U21 Championship where he got the team to the semi-finals.

In 1984, he led the Yugoslavia U23 side at the 1984 Summer Olympics. He guided the team to third place.

In 1986 he was a co-manager of the Yugoslavia national team, this time alongside Ivica Osim.

From 1991 to 1993, Toplak managed the Indonesia national team. In 1993, after leaving Indonesia, he announced his managerial retirement.

== Death ==
Toplak died on 25 July 2021 at the age of 89.

== Honours ==
=== Player ===
Olimpija Ljubljana

- Slovenian Republic League: 1952

Red Star Belgrade

- Yugoslav First League: 1955–56, 1956–57, 1958–59, 1959–60
- Yugoslav Cup: 1957–58, 1958–59
- Mitropa Cup: 1958

=== Manager ===
Yugoslavia

- Summer Olympics Third place: 1984
