= Vladica Popović =

Serbian footballer (1935–2020)

Personal information
- Full name: Vladimir Popović
- Date of birth: 17 March 1935
- Place of birth: Zemun, Kingdom of Yugoslavia
- Date of death: 10 August 2020 (aged 85)
- Place of death: Belgrade, Serbia
- Height: 1.76 m (5 ft 9 1/2 in)
- Position: Midfielder

Youth career
- Jedinstvo Zemun
- –1953: Red Star Belgrade

Senior career*
Years	Team	Apps	(Gls)
1953–1965	Red Star Belgrade	214	(8)
1965–1966	VfB Stuttgart	2	(0)
1966–1968	Stuttgarter Kickers	52	(2)
1968–1969	Canarias		
Total		268	(10)

International career
1956–1965	Yugoslavia	20	(0)

Managerial career
- Deportivo Italia
- 1971–1972: Independiente Santa Fe
- 1973: Atlético Nacional
- 1974: Deportivo Cali
- 1974–1975: Portuguesa
- 1976–1977: Napredak Kruševac
- 1984–1986: Deportivo Cali
- 1988: Trepča
- 1989: Deportivo Cali
- 1990–1991: Borac Banja Luka
- 1991–1992: Red Star Belgrade
- 1992–1993: Peru
- 1994–1995: Millonarios
- 1998–1999: Caracas
Medal record
Men's football
Representing Yugoslavia
Olympic Games
Silver medal – second place	1956 Melbourne	Team
- * Club domestic league appearances and goals

Vladimir "Vladica" Popović (Serbian Cyrillic: Владимир "Владица" Поповић; 17 March 1935 – 10 August 2020) was a Serbian professional footballer and manager. The biggest success in his coaching career was winning the Intercontinental Cup with Red Star Belgrade in 1991. He was the last surviving player from the Yugoslavia team in the 1958 World Cup.

== Playing career ==
Born in Zemun, Popović started playing at local side Jedinstvo but his talent was spotted while he was still very young and giants Red Star Belgrade brought him to their youth team where he will later play for more than a decade becoming team captain and also regular member of the Yugoslavia national team. He was part of the team that won the silver medal at the 1956 Summer Olympics. He earned a total of 20 caps (no goals) and his final international was a June 1965 World Cup qualification match away against Norway.

== Managerial career ==
Popović began coaching football in Venezuela in the 1970s, leading Portuguesa FC, Caracas F.C. and Deportivo Italia. He also managed Colombian sides Atlético Nacional, Deportivo Cali, and Millonarios as well as the Peru national football team.

== Honours ==
=== Club ===
Red Star Belgrade

- Yugoslav First League: 1955–56, 1956–57, 1958–59, 1959–60, 1963–64
- Yugoslav Cup: 1957–58, 1958–59, 1963–64
- Mitropa Cup: 1958

=== International ===
Yugoslavia

- Summer Olympics Second place: 1956

=== Manager ===
Independiente Santa Fe

- Categoría Primera A: 1971

Atlético Nacional

- Categoría Primera A: 1973

Deportivo Cali

- Categoría Primera A: 1974

Napredak Kruševac

- Yugoslav Second League (East): 1977–78

Red Star Belgrade

- Yugoslav First League: 1991–92
- Intercontinental Cup: 1991
