= Vladimir Durković =

Serbian footballer (1937–1972)

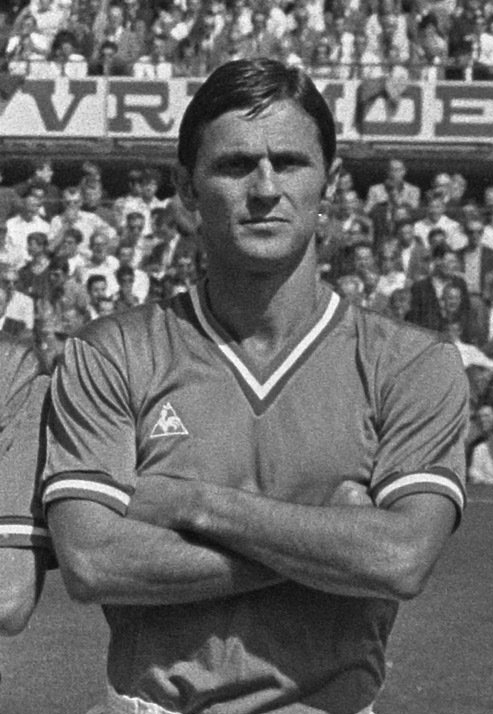
- Durković playing for Saint-Étienne in 1968

Personal information
- Date of birth: 6 November 1937
- Place of birth: Đakovica, Kingdom of Yugoslavia
- Date of death: 22 June 1972 (aged 34)
- Place of death: Sion, Switzerland
- Height: 1.77 m (5 ft 10 in)
- Position: Defender

Youth career
- Napredak Kruševac

Senior career*
Years	Team	Apps	(Gls)
1954–1955	Napredak Kruševac	9	(1)
1955–1966	Red Star Belgrade	177	(7)
1966–1967	Borussia M'gladbach	10	(0)
1967–1971	Saint-Étienne	116	(0)
1971–1972	Sion	25	(0)
Total		337	(7)

International career
1959–1966	Yugoslavia	50	(0)
Medal record
Men's Football
Representing Yugoslavia
Olympic Games
Gold medal – first place	1960 Rome	Team
European Championship
Silver medal – second place	1960 France	Team
- * Club domestic league appearances and goals

Vladimir Durković (Serbian Cyrillic: Владимир Дурковић; 6 November 1937 – 22 June 1972) was a Serbian footballer who played as a defender. He was part of the Yugoslav squad that won gold at the 1960 Summer Olympics.

== Club career ==
Durković played with Red Star Belgrade until he was 28 at which point he moved abroad and made a name for himself with Saint-Étienne, winning three Ligue 1 titles and the Coupe de France twice.

== International career ==
Capped 50 times by Yugoslavia between 1959 and 1966, Durković excelled as a 22-year-old at the first UEFA European Championship, offering defensive solidity and attacking penetration at right-back. Although Yugoslavia finished second in France, Durković won a gold medal at the Rome Olympics the following September. He also wore the number two shirt at the 1962 FIFA World Cup in Chile and was an ever-present as Yugoslavia eliminated former winners Uruguay and West Germany and finished fourth. His final international was a June 1966 friendly match against Bulgaria.

== Death ==
He died when shot by a drunken policeman in Sion, Switzerland in June 1972 at the age of 34. The police officer was later sentenced to nine years prison of which he served seven years.

== Honours ==
Red Star Belgrade

- Yugoslav First League: 1955–56, 1956–57, 1958–59, 1959–60, 1963–64
- Yugoslav Cup: 1957–58, 1958–59, 1963–64
- Mitropa Cup: 1958

Saint-Étienne

- Ligue 1: 1967–68, 1968–69, 1969–70
- Coupe de France: 1967–68, 1969–70

Yugoslavia

- UEFA European Championship: runner-up 1960
- Olympic gold medalist in 1960

Individual

- UEFA European Championship Team of the Tournament: 1960
