= Miloš Drizić =

Serbian footballer (born 1960)

Personal information
- Full name: Miloš Drizić
- Date of birth: 3 December 1960 (age 65)
- Place of birth: Niš, FPR Yugoslavia
- Height: 1.96 m (6 ft 5 in)
- Position: Defender

Senior career*
| Years | Team | Apps | (Gls) |
| 1979–1985 | Radnički Niš | 89 | (6) |
| 1985–1987 | Sutjeska Nikšić | 32 | (10) |
| 1987–1989 | Rad | 24 | (6) |
| 1989–1990 | Red Star Belgrade | 11 | (1) |
| 1990 | Rayo Vallecano | 10 | (0) |
| 1991–1992 | Dunfermline Athletic | 6 | (1) |
- * Club domestic league appearances and goals

Miloš Drizić (Serbian Cyrillic: Милош Дризић; born 3 December 1960) is a Serbian retired footballer.
