= 1967–68 Mitropa Cup =

Tournament details
- Dates: 15 November 1967 – 23 October 1968
- Teams: 16

Final positions
- Champions: (Socialist Federal Republic of Yugoslavia) Red Star Belgrade (2nd title)
- Runners-up: (Czechoslovakia) Spartak Trnava

Tournament statistics
- Matches played: 30
- Goals scored: 99 (3.3 per match)

The 1967–68 Mitropa Cup was the 28th season of the Mitropa football club tournament. It was contested by sixteen clubs from 15 European cities and 5 countries. Winner was Red Star Belgrade of Yugoslavia (Note: UEFA conventionally refers to Red Star Belgrade by the club's Serbian-language name, Crvena zvezda. Since the breakup of SFR Yugoslavia, the club competes under the auspices of its successor Serbian Football Association.) who beat Spartak Trnava of Czechoslovakia (Note: Since the breakup of Czechoslovakia, the club competes under the auspices of Slovak Football Association.) in the two-legged final 4–2 on aggregate. Notably, the first leg of the finals was scheduled to be held in Trnava on August 21, 1968, but was postponed due to the Warsaw Pact invasion of Czechoslovakia, which commenced on August 20, 1968 at 11 pm. The game was postponed and the final games were eventually held in October 1968.

== Teams of the 1967–68 Mitropa Cup ==
Country		League	Teams	Teams (Rankings in 1966–67 National Leagues)		
Czechoslovakia	Slovakia	Czechoslovak 1st League	4	Spartak Trnava (3)	Jednota Trenčín (6)	Internacionál Slovnaft Bratislava (10)
Czechoslovakia	Czech Lands	Czechoslovak 2nd League	4	Baník Ostrava (1)		
Austria		Austrian Nationalliga	3	Austria Vienna (3)	LASK Linz (4)	Wiener SC (5)
Hungary		Hungarian Nemzeti Bajnokság I	3	Újpesti Dózsa Budapest (2)	Tatabányai Bányász (5)	Diósgyori VTK Miskolc (7)
Italy		Italian Serie A	3	Cagliari Calcio (6)	Roma (10)	Atalanta Bergamo (11)
(Socialist Federal Republic of Yugoslavia) Yugoslavia	Bosnia	Yugoslav 1st League	3	Željezničar Sarajevo (6)		
(Socialist Federal Republic of Yugoslavia) Yugoslavia	Macedonia	Yugoslav 1st League	3	Vardar Skopje (8)		
(Socialist Federal Republic of Yugoslavia) Yugoslavia	Serbia	Yugoslav 1st League	3	Red Star Belgrade (5)		

== Bracket ==
Round of 16
(Czechoslovakia) Spartak Trnava	2	1	3
(Italy) Roma	1	1	1
(Czechoslovakia) Jednota Trenčín	0	0	0
(Socialist Federal Republic of Yugoslavia) Željezničar Sarajevo	0	1	1
(Austria) LASK Linz	0	1	1
(Socialist Federal Republic of Yugoslavia) Vardar Skopje	0	2	2
(Italy) Cagliari Calcio	6	2	8
(Czechoslovakia) Baník Ostrava	0	3	3
Austria Vienna	1	2	3
(Italy) Atalanta Bergamo	2	0	2
(Hungary) Újpesti Dózsa Bud.	6	1	7
(Austria) Wiener SC	1	1	2
(Socialist Federal Republic of Yugoslavia) Red Star Belgrade	3	1	4
(Hungary) Diósgyori VTK Misk.	0	3	3
(Hungary) Tatabányai Bányász	3	0	3
(Czechoslovakia) Inter. Slovnaft Bratis.	1	7	8

Quarter-finals
(Czechoslovakia) Spartak Trnava	2	2	4
(Socialist Federal Republic of Yugoslavia) Željezničar Sarajevo	1	2	3
(Socialist Federal Republic of Yugoslavia) Vardar Skopje	1	1	2
(Italy) Cagliari Calcio	0	0	0
Austria Vienna	2	1	3
(Hungary) Újpesti Dózsa Bud.	2	4	6
(Socialist Federal Republic of Yugoslavia) Red Star Belgrade	3	2	5
(Czechoslovakia) Inter. Slovnaft Bratisl.	0	3	3

Semi-finals
(Czechoslovakia) Spartak Trnava	4	2	6
(Socialist Federal Republic of Yugoslavia) Vardar Skopje	1	2	3
(Hungary) Újpesti Dózsa Bud.	1	1	2
(Socialist Federal Republic of Yugoslavia) Red Star Belgrade	0	4	4

Final
(Czechoslovakia) Spartak Trnava	1	1	2
(Socialist Federal Republic of Yugoslavia) Red Star Belgrade	0	4	4

== Final ==
=== 1st leg ===
16 October 1968

Spartak Trnava (Czechoslovakia)	1–0	(Socialist Federal Republic of Yugoslavia) Red Star Belgrade
Švec 48'	Ref. (in German)

Spartak Stadium, Trnava
Attendance: 12,500
Referee: Bruno de Marchi (Italy)

=== 2nd leg ===
23 October 1968

Red Star Belgrade (Socialist Federal Republic of Yugoslavia)	4–1	(Czechoslovakia) Spartak Trnava
Lazarević 35'; Ostojić 57'; Antonijević 64'; Lazarević 69'	Ref. 1 (in Spanish) Ref. 2 (in Serbian)	Kuna 39'

Red Star Stadium, Belgrade
Attendance: 20,500
Referee: Erich Linemayr (Austria)

1967–68 Mitropa Cup

Red Star Belgrade
Second Title

== See also ==
- 1967–68 European Cup
- 1967–68 European Cup Winners' Cup
- 1967–68 Inter-Cities Fairs Cup
- 1968 Intertoto Cup
- 1967–68 Balkans Cup
