= 1955–56 Yugoslav First League =

Annual soccer tournament

Prva savezna liga
- Season: 1955–56
- Champions: Red Star (3rd title)
- Relegated: Željezničar; Proleter Osijek
- European Cup: Red Star
- Top goalscorer: Muhamed Mujić; Tihomir Ognjanov; Todor Veselinović (21 goals each)

The 1955–56 season was the tenth season of the Yugoslav First League (Serbo-Croatian: Prva savezna liga, lit. 'First Federal League'), the top level association football competition of SFR Yugoslavia, since its establishment in 1946. Fourteen teams contested the competition, with Red Star winning their third title.

== Teams ==
At the end of the previous season Lokomotiva Zagreb and Vardar were relegated from top level. They were replaced by Velež and Budućnost Titograd.

Team	Location	Federal Republic	Position in 1954–55
BSK	Belgrade	SR Serbia	2nd
Budućnost	Titograd	SR Montenegro	—N/a
Dinamo Zagreb	Zagreb	SR Croatia	3rd
Hajduk Split	Split	SR Croatia	1st
Partizan	Belgrade	SR Serbia	5th
Proleter Osijek	Osijek	SR Croatia	12th
Radnički Belgrade	Belgrade	SR Serbia	10th
Red Star	Belgrade	SR Serbia	4th
FK Sarajevo	Sarajevo	SR Bosnia and Herzegovina	7th
Spartak Subotica	Subotica	SR Serbia	8th
Velež	Mostar	SR Bosnia and Herzegovina	—N/a
Vojvodina	Novi Sad	SR Serbia	6th
NK Zagreb	Zagreb	SR Croatia	9th
Željezničar	Sarajevo	SR Bosnia and Herzegovina	11th

== League table ==
Pos	Team	Pld	W	D	L	GF	GA	GR	Pts	Qualification or relegation
1	Red Star Belgrade (C)	26	16	8	2	62	29	2.138	40	Qualification for European Cup preliminary round
2	Partizan	26	14	7	5	65	35	1.857	35	
3	Radnički Beograd	26	13	5	8	54	45	1.200	31	
4	Dinamo Zagreb	26	12	4	10	42	47	0.894	28	
5	Vojvodina	26	9	9	8	57	41	1.390	27	
6	Sarajevo	26	12	3	11	47	48	0.979	27	
7	Velež	26	8	9	9	42	41	1.024	25	
8	NK Zagreb	26	10	4	12	45	39	1.154	24	
9	Spartak Subotica	26	8	8	10	43	44	0.977	24	
10	BSK	26	8	8	10	41	45	0.911	24	
11	Budućnost	26	10	4	12	46	58	0.793	24	
12	Hajduk Split	26	9	5	12	52	39	1.333	23	
13	Željezničar (R)	26	7	7	12	33	54	0.611	21	Relegation to Yugoslav Second League
14	Proleter Osijek (R)	26	5	1	20	30	94	0.319	11	Relegation to Yugoslav Second League

Source: rsssf.org
Rules for classification: 1st points; 2nd goal average
Cup not disputed this season.
(C) Champions; (R) Relegated

== Results ==
Home \ Away	BSK	BUD	DIN	HAJ	PAR	PRO	RBE	RSB	SAR	SPA	VEL	VOJ	ZAG	ŽEL
BSK		1–2	1–2	2–0	1–1	3–0	2–2	1–6	1–3	2–2	1–0	5–2	2–0	3–3
Budućnost	1–0		3–0	2–1	2–3	5–0	0–2	1–3	1–1	3–1	1–1	2–2	0–0	7–0
Dinamo Zagreb	1–0	1–0		1–0	2–4	5–3	1–2	2–2	2–0	3–1	2–1	3–2	2–0	4–0
Hajduk Split	1–1	5–1	1–1		1–2	5–0	5–0	0–3	6–0	1–0	4–2	1–6	3–3	6–1
Partizan	1–1	9–0	0–0	1–0		8–1	2–4	0–1	2–2	2–2	2–2	0–3	2–1	3–1
Proleter Osijek	1–3	3–0	4–1	0–3	1–5		1–1	1–5	3–2	0–3	1–2	2–4	0–2	1–0
Radnički Beograd	1–4	5–1	4–0	1–0	4–3	0–2		0–2	1–2	1–0	2–2	3–2	2–0	3–1
Red Star	2–2	2–0	4–3	2–0	1–3	5–0	1–1		1–0	3–1	1–1	1–1	2–1	3–1
Sarajevo	4–1	3–2	0–3	1–0	0–4	6–0	3–1	2–3		7–1	2–1	0–0	3–1	2–0
Spartak Subotica	3–0	3–1	6–2	1–4	1–1	4–1	1–7	0–0	4–0		0–0	2–0	3–0	0–0
Velež	2–1	2–4	6–1	1–1	1–3	4–2	3–1	1–3	3–0	2–1		1–1	2–1	2–2
Vojvodina	0–1	9–1	0–0	1–0	1–2	7–2	1–1	2–2	4–1	2–2	0–0		2–1	3–0
NK Zagreb	3–0	0–3	2–0	3–1	1–2	8–1	2–4	4–3	2–1	0–0	2–0	5–1		3–0
Željezničar	2–2	1–3	1–0	3–3	1–0	3–0	5–1	1–1	1–2	2–1	2–0	3–1	0–0	

Source: DataSoccer.it
Legend: Blue = home team win; Yellow = draw; Red = away team win.

== Winning squad ==
Champions:

- RED STAR BELGRADE (coach: Milovan Ćirić)

players (league matches/league goals):

- Rajko Mitić (25/4)
- Lazar Tasić (25/4)
- Ivan Toplak (24/12)
- Antun Rudinski (24/6)
- Ljubomir Spajić (23/0)
- Dragoslav Šekularac (22/6)
- Branko Stanković (20/1)
- Srboljub Krivokuća (19/0) -goalkeeper-
- Borivoje Kostić (17/14)
- Vladimir Popović (17/2)
- Branko Nešović (17/0)
- Miljan Zeković (17/0)
- Todor Živanović (12/9)
- Vladimir Durković (7/1)
- Vladimir Beara (7/0) -goalkeeper-
- Jovan Cokić (5/2)
- Miljan Miljanić (2/0)
- Novak Tomić (2/0)
- Stevan Veselinov (1/0)

== Top scorers ==
Rank	Player	Club	Goals
1	(Socialist Federal Republic of Yugoslavia) Todor Veselinović	Vojvodina	21
1	(Socialist Federal Republic of Yugoslavia) Muhamed Mujić	Velež	21
1	(Socialist Federal Republic of Yugoslavia) Tihomir Ognjanov	Red Star	21
4	(Socialist Federal Republic of Yugoslavia) Zdravko Rajkov	Vojvodina	15
5	(Socialist Federal Republic of Yugoslavia) Bora Kostić	Red Star	14
6	(Socialist Federal Republic of Yugoslavia) Miloš Milutinović	Partizan	13
6	(Socialist Federal Republic of Yugoslavia) Bernard Vukas	Hajduk Split	13
8	(Socialist Federal Republic of Yugoslavia) Ivan Toplak	Red Star	12

== See also ==
- 1955–56 Yugoslav Second League
- 1955 Yugoslav Cup
