= Boško Kajganić =

Yugoslav footballer

Personal information
- Full name: Boško Kajganić
- Date of birth: 29 April 1949
- Place of birth: Odžaci, SFR Yugoslavia
- Date of death: 21 November 1977 (aged 28)
- Place of death: Istanbul, Turkey
- Position: Goalkeeper

Senior career*
Years	Team	Apps	(Gls)
1967–1977	Red Star Belgrade	47	(0)
1969–1970	→ Sloga Kraljevo (loan)		
1973–1974	→ Vardar (loan)	34	(0)
1977	Galatasaray	6	(0)
- * Club domestic league appearances and goals

Boško Kajganić (29 April 1949 – 21 November 1977) was a Yugoslav footballer. He died in a car accident in 1977, at the age of 28.

== Personal life ==
His son, Ognjen Kajganić, is a retired professional handball player.
