= 1958–59 Yugoslav Cup =

Marshal Tito Cup

Tournament details
- Country: Yugoslavia

Final positions
- Champions: Red Star (5th title)
- Runners-up: Partizan

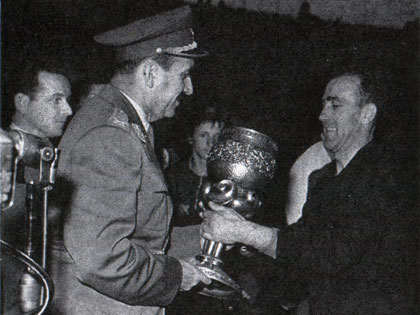
Bogdan Vujovič presents the trophy to Ljubiša Spajić, the Red Star captain

The 1958–59 Yugoslav Cup was the 12th season of the top football knockout competition in SFR Yugoslavia, the Yugoslav Cup (Serbo-Croatian: Kup Jugoslavije), also known as the "Marshal Tito Cup" (Kup Maršala Tita), since its establishment in 1946.

== First round ==
In the following tables winning teams are marked in bold; teams from outside top level are marked in italic script.

Tie no	Home team	Score	Away team
1	Borac Banja Luka	2–3 (a.e.t.)	**Lokomotiva**
2	Borac Čačak	0–3	**Radnički Belgrade**
3	**Borovo**	1–0	Sarajevo
4	**Budućnost Titograd**	3–2	Sutjeska Nikšić
5	**Dinamo Zagreb**	3–2	Proleter Osijek
6	**Garnizon JNA Borac**	6–1	Šibenik
7	Novi Sad	2–2 (7–8 p)	**Partizan**
8	Odred Ljubljana'	1–3	**Rijeka**
9	OFK Belgrade	1–2	**Željezničar Sarajevo**
10	Pelister Bitola	2–3	**Radnički Kragujevac**
11	**Radnički Sombor**	3–1	Vardar
12	**Red Star**	4–1	Elektrostroj Zagreb
13	Trešnjevka	2–3	**Vojvodina**
14	**Varteks**	5–0	Rabotnički
15	**Velež**	5–0	Radnički Niš

== Second round ==
Tie no	Home team	Score	Away team
1	Budućnost Titograd	1–2	**Garnizon JNA Borac**
2	**Lokomotiva**	4–2	Hajduk Split
3	Radnički Kragujevac	1–3	**Partizan**
4	Radnički Sombor	2–5	**Red Star**
5	**Rijeka**	2–1	Radnički Belgrade
6	**Varteks**	2–1 (a.e.t.)	Velež
7	**Vojvodina**	2–0	Borovo
8	Željezničar Sarajevo	2–3	**Dinamo Zagreb**

== Quarter-finals ==
Tie no	Home team	Score	Away team
1	**Partizan**	1–0	Garnizon JNA Borac
2	**Red Star**	2–1	Lokomotiva
3	**Rijeka**	4–2	Varteks
4	**Vojvodina**	5–1	Dinamo Zagreb

== Semi-finals ==
Tie no	Home team	Score	Away team
1	**Partizan**	2–1	Vojvodina
2	Rijeka	0–2	**Red Star**

== Final ==
23 May 1959

Red Star	3–1	Partizan
Maravić 11'; Kostić 57', 71' (pen.)		Galić 62'

Stadion JNA, Belgrade
Attendance: 50,000
Referee: Leo Lemešić (Split)

RED STAR:
GK	1	(Socialist Federal Republic of Yugoslavia) Vladimir Beara
	2	(Socialist Federal Republic of Yugoslavia) Vladimir Durković
	3	(Socialist Federal Republic of Yugoslavia) Miljan Zeković
	4	(Socialist Federal Republic of Yugoslavia) Lazar Tasić
	5	(Socialist Federal Republic of Yugoslavia) Ljubiša Spajić (c)
	6	(Socialist Federal Republic of Yugoslavia) Vladica Popović
	7	(Socialist Federal Republic of Yugoslavia) Dragoslav Šekularac
	8	(Socialist Federal Republic of Yugoslavia) Dušan Maravić
	9	(Socialist Federal Republic of Yugoslavia) Ivan Popović
	10	(Socialist Federal Republic of Yugoslavia) Bora Kostić
	11	(Socialist Federal Republic of Yugoslavia) Antun Rudinski
Manager:
(Socialist Federal Republic of Yugoslavia) Miša Pavić

PARTIZAN:
GK	**1**	(Socialist Federal Republic of Yugoslavia) Milutin Šoškić
	**2**	(Socialist Federal Republic of Yugoslavia) Bruno Belin
	**3**	(Socialist Federal Republic of Yugoslavia) Fahrudin Jusufi
	**4**	(Socialist Federal Republic of Yugoslavia) Aleksandar Jončić
	**5**	(Socialist Federal Republic of Yugoslavia) Božidar Pajević
	**6**	(Socialist Federal Republic of Yugoslavia) Jovan Miladinović
	**7**	(Socialist Federal Republic of Yugoslavia) Zvezdan Čebinac	Substituted off
	**8**	(Socialist Federal Republic of Yugoslavia) Milan Vukelić
	**9**	(Socialist Federal Republic of Yugoslavia) Tomislav Kaloperović
	**10**	(Socialist Federal Republic of Yugoslavia) Milan Galić
	**11**	(Socialist Federal Republic of Yugoslavia) Branislav Mihajlović
Substitutes:
	?	(Socialist Federal Republic of Yugoslavia) Dragoljub Blažić	Substituted on
Manager:
(Hungary) Illés Spitz

== See also ==
- 1958–59 Yugoslav First League
- 1958–59 Yugoslav Second League
