= Stevan Ostojić =

Serbian footballer (1941–2022)

Personal information
- Date of birth: 20 August 1941
- Place of birth: Ostojićevo, German-occupied Serbia
- Date of death: 15 May 2022 (aged 80)
- Place of death: Belgrade, Serbia
- Position: Striker

Youth career
- OFK Subotica

Senior career*
Years	Team	Apps	(Gls)
1961–1964	Radnički Niš	65	(37)
1964–1969	Red Star Belgrade	107	(44)
1970	Monaco	9	(6)
1970–1971	Red Star Belgrade	17	(5)
1971–1973	Fenerbahçe	31	(7)
1974	San Jose Earthquakes	3	(0)
Total		232	(99)

International career
1964–1971	Yugoslavia	2	(0)

Managerial career
- 1982–1983: Red Star Belgrade
- 1983: Spartak Subotica
- 1998: Trikala
- * Club domestic league appearances and goals

Stevan Ostojić (Serbian Cyrillic: Стеван Остојић; 20 August 1941 – 15 May 2022) was a Serbian professional footballer who played as a striker.

Born just a few months following the start of World War II in Yugoslavia to father Spasoje who worked as a railroad engineer, young Ostojić grew up in Subotica where the family moved during the war. He began playing football during the mid-1950s when his older brother Ivan who already played with OFK Subotica took him to a training session.

== International career ==
On the national level, Ostojić earned two caps and made his debut for Yugoslavia in an April 1964 friendly match against Bulgaria. His other international match came over seven years later, when he replaced Jovan Aćimović at half time in a friendly against Mexico.

== Honours ==
Red Star Belgrade

- Yugoslav First League: 1967–68, 1968–69
- Yugoslav Cup: 1967–68, 1970–71
- Mitropa Cup: 1967–68
