= Mihajlo Pjanović =

Serbian footballer

Personal information
- Date of birth: 13 February 1977 (age 49)
- Place of birth: Prijepolje, SFR Yugoslavia
- Height: 1.82 m (6 ft 0 in)
- Position: Striker

Youth career
- Polimlje

Senior career*
Years	Team	Apps	(Gls)
1994–1995	Javor Ivanjica	19	(8)
1995–1998	OFK Beograd	82	(19)
1999–2003	Red Star Belgrade	111	(80)
2003–2006	Spartak Moscow	48	(11)
2007	Rostov	11	(3)
Total		271	(121)

International career
1996–1999	FR Yugoslavia U21 (Note: Official UEFA matches only)	9	(0)
2000–2002	FR Yugoslavia	5	(0)
- * Club domestic league appearances and goals

Mihajlo Pjanović (Serbian Cyrillic: Михајло Пјановић; born 13 February 1977) is a Serbian retired footballer who played as a striker.

== Club career ==
Pjanović started his senior career with Javor Ivanjica, before moving to OFK Beograd. He earned himself a transfer to Red Star Belgrade in the 1999 winter transfer window. During his tenure with the Crveno-beli, Pjanović won two national championships (2000 and 2001) and three national cups (1999, 2000, and 2002). He totaled 111 league appearances and scored 80 goals, before moving to Spartak Moscow in the summer of 2003. At the age of 30, Pjanović finished his playing career with Rostov.

== International career ==
At international level, Pjanović made five appearances for the national team of FR Yugoslavia between 2000 and 2002. His final international was a September 2002 friendly match away against the Czech Republic.

== Honours ==
Red Star Belgrade

- First League of FR Yugoslavia: 1999–2000, 2000–01
- FR Yugoslavia Cup: 1998–99, 1999–2000, 2001–02
