= Vojin Lazarević =

Yugoslav and Montenegrin football manager and player

Personal information
- Full name: Vojin Lazarević
- Date of birth: 22 February 1942 (age 84)
- Place of birth: Nikšić, Italian-occupied Montenegro
- Height: 1.78 m (5 ft 10 in)
- Position: Striker

Youth career
- 1957–1959: Sutjeska Nikšić

Senior career*
Years	Team	Apps	(Gls)
1959–1966	Sutjeska Nikšić	150	(86)
1966–1970	Red Star Belgrade	112	(68)
1970	RFC Liège	6	(1)
1970–1971	Nancy	31	(11)
1972–1974	Red Star Belgrade	51	(35)
1974	Toronto Metros	6	(4)
1974–1975	Vrbas	24	(7)
Total		380	(212)

International career
1964–1969	Yugoslavia	5	(1)

Managerial career
- 1975: Vrbas
- 1997: Red Star Belgrade
- 1998–1999: Red Star Belgrade
- 2000: Milicionar
- 2001: Sutjeska Nikšić
- * Club domestic league appearances and goals

Vojin Lazarević (Serbian Cyrillic: Војин Лазаревић; born 22 February 1942) is a former Yugoslav and Montenegrin football manager and player.

== Club career ==
A prolific striker, Lazarević started out at his hometown club Sutjeska Nikšić. He was the Yugoslav Second League (Group East) top scorer on three occasions, before moving to Red Star Belgrade in 1966. Over the next four seasons, Lazarević scored 68 goals in 112 appearances in the Yugoslav First League, helping the club win three consecutive championships (1968, 1969, and 1970). He subsequently moved abroad, spending some time at RFC Liège (Belgium) and Nancy (France), before returning to Red Star in 1972. During his second spell in Belgrade, Lazarević was the league's joint top scorer in the 1972–73 season with 25 goals, as the club won the title. He moved abroad again in 1974, this time to Canada, and joined the Toronto Metros. Shortly after, Lazarević returned to his homeland and played one season with Vrbas, before retiring from the game.

== International career ==
At international level, Lazarević was capped five times for Yugoslavia between 1964 and 1969, scoring one goal.

== Managerial career ==
After hanging up his boots, Lazarević served twice as manager of Red Star Belgrade in the late 1990s, winning two national cups. He was also manager of Milicionar (2000) and Sutjeska Nikšić (2001).

== Career statistics ==
=== Club ===
Appearances and goals by club, season and competition
Club	Season	League		
Club	Season	Division	Apps	Goals
Sutjeska Nikšić	1959–60	Yugoslav Second League	1	0
Sutjeska Nikšić	1960–61	Yugoslav Second League	13	3
Sutjeska Nikšić	1961–62	Yugoslav Second League	21	9
Sutjeska Nikšić	1962–63	Yugoslav Second League	30	20
Sutjeska Nikšić	1963–64	Yugoslav Second League	30	27
Sutjeska Nikšić	1964–65	Yugoslav First League	25	6
Sutjeska Nikšić	1965–66	Yugoslav Second League	30	21
Sutjeska Nikšić	Total		150	86
Red Star Belgrade	1966–67	Yugoslav First League	23	14
Red Star Belgrade	1967–68	Yugoslav First League	29	20
Red Star Belgrade	1968–69	Yugoslav First League	34	21
Red Star Belgrade	1969–70	Yugoslav First League	26	13
Red Star Belgrade	Total		112	68
RFC Liège	1970–71	Belgian First Division	6	1
Nancy	1970–71	French Division 1	19	8
Nancy	1971–72	French Division 1	12	3
Nancy	Total		31	11
Red Star Belgrade	1971–72	Yugoslav First League	6	9
Red Star Belgrade	1972–73	Yugoslav First League	34	24
Red Star Belgrade	1973–74	Yugoslav First League	11	2
Red Star Belgrade	Total		51	35
Toronto Metros	1974	North American Soccer League	6	4
Vrbas	1974–75	Yugoslav Second League	24	7
Career total			380	212

=== International ===
Appearances and goals by national team and year
National team	Year	Apps	Goals
Yugoslavia	1964	1	0
Yugoslavia	1965	0	0
Yugoslavia	1966	0	0
Yugoslavia	1967	2	1
Yugoslavia	1968	1	0
Yugoslavia	1969	1	0
Total		5	1

== Honours ==
=== Player ===
Sutjeska Nikšić

- Yugoslav Second League: 1963–64 (Group East), 1965–66 (Group East)

Red Star Belgrade

- Yugoslav First League: 1967–68, 1968–69, 1969–70, 1972–73
- Yugoslav Cup: 1967–68, 1969–70

Individual

- Yugoslav First League top scorer: 1968–69, 1972–73
- Yugoslav Second League top scorer: 1962–63 (Group East), 1963–64 (Group East), 1965–66 (Group East)
- Mitropa Cup top scorer: 1967–68

=== Manager ===
Red Star Belgrade

- FR Yugoslavia Cup: 1996–97, 1998–99
