= 1958–59 Yugoslav First League =

Prva savezna liga
- Season: 1958–59
- Dates: 31 August 1958 – 22 June 1959
- Champions: Red Star (5th title)
- Relegated: Željezničar; Vardar
- European Cup: Red Star
- Top goalscorer: Bora Kostić (25)

The 1958–59 Yugoslav First League season was the 13th season of the First Federal League (Serbo-Croatian: Prva savezna liga), the top level association football league of SFR Yugoslavia, since its establishment in 1946. Twelve teams contested the competition, with Red Star winning their fifth title.

== Teams ==
Due to the reduction of the league from 14 to 12 clubs, at the end of the previous season four clubs were relegated (RNK Split, Spartak Subotica, OFK Belgrade and NK Zagreb) and were replaced by two teams - NK Rijeka and FK Sarajevo.

Team	Location	Federal Republic	Position in 1957–58
Budućnost	Titograd	SR Montenegro	10th
Dinamo Zagreb	Zagreb	SR Croatia	1st
Hajduk Split	Split	SR Croatia	9th
Partizan	Belgrade	SR Serbia	2nd
Radnički Belgrade	Belgrade	SR Serbia	3rd
Red Star	Belgrade	SR Serbia	4th
NK Rijeka	Rijeka	SR Croatia	—
FK Sarajevo	Sarajevo	SR Bosnia and Herzegovina	—
Vardar	Skopje	SR Macedonia	7th
Velež	Mostar	SR Bosnia and Herzegovina	6th
Vojvodina	Novi Sad	SR Serbia	5th
Željezničar	Sarajevo	SR Bosnia and Herzegovina	8th

== League table ==
Pos	Team	Pld	W	D	L	GF	GA	GD	Pts	Qualification or relegation
1	Red Star Belgrade (C)	22	14	3	5	50	19	+31	31	Qualification for European Cup preliminary round
2	Partizan	22	14	3	5	39	29	+10	31	
3	Vojvodina	22	13	4	5	47	22	+25	30	
4	Radnički Beograd	22	9	4	9	35	27	+8	22	
5	Dinamo Zagreb	22	9	4	9	35	28	+7	22	
6	Velež	22	10	2	10	35	38	−3	22	
7	Hajduk Split	22	7	7	8	33	35	−2	21	
8	Rijeka	22	8	4	10	29	44	−15	20	
9	Budućnost	22	7	5	10	25	41	−16	19	
10	Sarajevo	22	7	4	11	25	36	−11	18	
11	Željezničar (R)	22	7	3	12	26	35	−9	17	Relegation to Yugoslav Second League
12	Vardar (R)	22	4	3	15	23	47	−24	11	Relegation to Yugoslav Second League

Source: rsssf.org
Rules for classification: 1) points; 2) goal difference; 3) number of goals scored.
(C) Champions; (R) Relegated

== Results ==
Home \ Away	BUD	DIN	HAJ	PAR	RBE	RSB	RIJ	SAR	VAR	VEL	VOJ	ŽEL
Budućnost		2–0	1–1	0–1	2–1	1–5	1–1	3–0	3–2	0–1	2–1	2–0
Dinamo Zagreb	0–0		1–1	4–1	3–1	0–0	6–0	3–1	2–0	2–0	2–4	4–0
Hajduk Split	1–1	1–1		0–1	2–1	4–1	6–2	1–0	3–0	0–2	1–1	2–0
Partizan	5–3	4–1	3–1		1–0	0–2	2–1	1–1	2–0	1–0	2–0	4–2
Radnički Beograd	4–0	1–0	3–1	1–2		4–1	2–3	1–0	2–0	4–1	1–3	1–0
Red Star	5–0	4–0	7–0	1–3	0–0		3–0	3–1	3–2	4–0	2–0	1–0
Rijeka	2–0	1–0	1–1	3–3	1–1	0–3		3–1	1–0	2–1	1–0	2–0
Sarajevo	1–1	1–0	2–1	1–0	2–1	1–0	4–1		3–2	1–2	0–0	0–0
Vardar	1–2	1–2	0–5	0–0	1–1	1–0	2–1	3–0		4–0	1–3	1–1
Velež	2–1	2–1	0–0	6–2	1–3	1–3	3–1	2–0	7–1		2–2	2–1
Vojvodina	5–0	1–0	4–1	2–0	2–1	0–0	3–1	4–3	2–0	4–0		6–0
Željezničar	2–0	2–3	3–0	0–1	1–1	1–2	2–1	4–1	4–1	1–0	2–0	

Source: DataSoccer.it
Legend: Blue = home team win; Yellow = draw; Red = away team win.

== Top scorers ==
Rank	Player	Club	Goals
1	(Socialist Federal Republic of Yugoslavia) Bora Kostić	Red Star	25
2	(Socialist Federal Republic of Yugoslavia) Zdravko Rajkov	Vojvodina	12
3	(Socialist Federal Republic of Yugoslavia) Aleksandar Petaković	Radnički Belgrade	10
3	(Socialist Federal Republic of Yugoslavia) Branislav Mihajlović	Partizan	10
3	(Socialist Federal Republic of Yugoslavia) Vlado Zelenika	Velež	10
6	(Socialist Federal Republic of Yugoslavia) Ivan Medle	Rijeka	9
6	(Socialist Federal Republic of Yugoslavia) Zlatko Papec	Hajduk Split	9
6	(Socialist Federal Republic of Yugoslavia) Andon Dončevski	Vardar	9
6	(Socialist Federal Republic of Yugoslavia) Salih Šehović	Sarajevo	9

== See also ==
- 1958–59 Yugoslav Second League
- 1958–59 Yugoslav Cup
