= Jovan Aćimović =

Serbian footballer

Personal information
- Date of birth: 21 June 1948 (age 78)
- Place of birth: Belgrade, PR Serbia, FPR Yugoslavia
- Height: 1.76 m (5 ft 9 1/2 in)
- Position: Midfielder

Senior career*
Years	Team	Apps	(Gls)
1964–1965	OFK Belgrade	0	(0)
1965–1976	Red Star Belgrade	237	(43)
1976–1978	1. FC Saarbrücken	41	(1)
1978–1979	Sinđelić Beograd		

International career
1968–1976	Yugoslavia	55	(3)

Managerial career
- 1985–1991: Red Star Belgrade (assistant)
Medal record
Men's Football
Representing Yugoslavia
European Championship
Silver medal – second place	1968 Italy	Team
- * Club domestic league appearances and goals

Jovan "Kule" Aćimović (Serbian Cyrillic: Јован Куле Аћимовић; born 21 June 1948) is a Serbian former footballer who played as a midfielder.

His son Đorđe was also a footballer who played for Red Star Belgrade and Mačva Šabac.

== International career ==
On the national level, Aćimović made his debut for Yugoslavia in the first leg of the June 1968 European Championship final against Italy and earned a total of 55 caps, scoring 3 goals. He also was a participant at the 1974 FIFA World Cup and his final international was the June 1976 European Championship third-place playoff against the Netherlands.

Aćimović on his team's role at the UEFA Euro 1976:

"Two things factored in our final result. First of all, the score of the first half of the match with Germany and then the fact that we, as hosts of the tournament, were prevented from our plans of showing what we were made of. Against the Germans, we thought that we had the final in our hands. At half time, some of us players were even talking about the final. The atmosphere in Belgrade and Zagreb was good but there was pressure felt everywhere we went. Everyone expected the gold medal and we weren't able to carry that weight on our shoulders."
