= History of Red Star Belgrade =

The history of Red Star Belgrade's football team began with its establishment by a committee of Yugoslav Communists on 4 March 1945. Slobodan Penezić supervised the committee which founded Red Star, composed largely of communist veterans from World War II. This was in contrast to Partizan, as it was founded by high-ranking generals and members of the Yugoslav People's Army.

== History ==
=== Establishment and the first title (1945–1951) ===
In February 1945, during World War II, a group of young men, members of the Serbian United Antifascist Youth League, decided to form a Youth Physical Culture Society, that was to become Red Star Belgrade on 4 March. At the end of the Second World War, several pre-war Yugoslav clubs were dissolved because they had played matches during the war and were labelled collaborators by Marshal Josip Broz Tito's communist authorities. Two of these clubs from Belgrade were SK Jugoslavija and BSK Belgrade. Red Star was formed from the remains of Jugoslavija and they were given Jugoslavija's stadium, offices, players, and even their red and white colours. The name Red Star was assigned to the club after a long discussion, and the first vice presidents of the sport society, Zoran Žujović and Slobodan Ćosić, were the ones who assigned it. After numerous proposals, Ćosić finally said: "Should we call our society the Star?", and Žujović spontaneously said: "Great, if it is the Star, let it be Red Star". With this proposal all the attendees were in agreement, although there were suggestions that the club be called the Blue Star. Ultimately, Red star was soon adopted as a symbol of Serbia, a sporting institution that remains the country's most popular to this day. On that day, Red Star played the first football match in the club's history against the First Battalion of the Second Brigade of KNOJ (People's Defence Corps of Yugoslavia) and won 3–0. Five days later, a football section was formed, led by Kosta Tomašević and Predrag Đajić. The two of them defended the honor of Red Star on the playing field - Tomašević was the first striker and scorer in the history of the club (who scored also the first European goal for Red Star against Rapid JC during the 1956–57 European Cup), and Đajić was a strong midfielder. In the post-war 1946 season, Red Star won the Serbian Championship and thus was promoted to the Yugoslav First League. In the first seasons, the club achieved the 3rd place and two vice-championships. However, in the period from 1948 to 1950, the club scored a series of hat-trick triumphs in Yugoslav Cups, winning finals against city rival Partizan, Naša Krila of Zemun and Dinamo Zagreb. Red Star's first League championship was won decisively. Three rounds before the end, Dinamo from Zagreb were five points ahead in the league (winning a match earned a club two points at the time.) However, the team from Zagreb was defeated by a team from Sarajevo, and Red Star won the rivals’ duel for the championship and entered the last round, trailing by a single point. The match between BSK Belgrade and Dinamo ended in a 2–2 draw, and the Championship was decided a day later, on 4 November, in a match with Partizan. Red Star's eternal rival had won the previous derby very convincingly earlier that season (6–1), but this time, Red Star produced the 2–0 scoreline that was needed and thanks to a slightly better goal-average, they became the national champion of Yugoslavia for the very first time.

=== The late 1950s – the first era of dominance (1952–1958) ===
Red Star also won championship in 1953, however, real changes would yet follow in the middle of the decade, when a stable club structure was formed with Dušan Blagojević acting as president, Slobodan Ćosić as secretary general and the great Aca Obradović, famous for his nickname Doctor O, acting as technical director of the club. Together, they paved the way for a generation that would fully dominate the Yugoslav and European football scenes for the following five years. It was a team of players such as Beara, Durković, Stanković, Popović, Mitić, Kostić and Šekularac. Those football players, whose names are still remembered, won four Yugoslav championships and two Cups, not missing the opportunity to win every Yugoslav Trophy for five straight seasons. Red Star's play was fast and offensive, gaining the club great popularity both in the country and in the world. As they were winning matches on the field, Obradović formed the ground for professional work that would later serve as the basis of numerous successes achieved by the club. In 1956, Red star won the championship and achieved the semi-final of the 1956–57 European Cup, where they played against Fiorentina. Red Star striker Kostić had scored five goals in their four European Cup games so far. Despite Kostic's ability in front of goal, Red Star failed to produce any goals and so it was the Italians, who proceeded to the final. As champions, Red Star were Yugoslavia's entrants into the 1957–58 European Cup where they were famously beaten 5–4 on aggregate by English champions Manchester United in the quarter-finals, with the team managed by Matt Busby beating Red Star 2–1 in the first leg in England before drawing 3–3 with them in Yugoslavia in the return game on 5 February at JNA Stadium. The second leg is notable for being the last game played by the "Busby Babes". On the return flight to England the following day, the plane crashed in Munich, West Germany, resulting in the deaths of 23 people including eight Manchester United players. In 1958, Red Star won also its first European trophy, the Mitropa Cup, who had been played during summer, in the break between the seasons. The trophy was won without losing a single game.

=== Crisis and a new Red Star stadium (1958–1966) ===
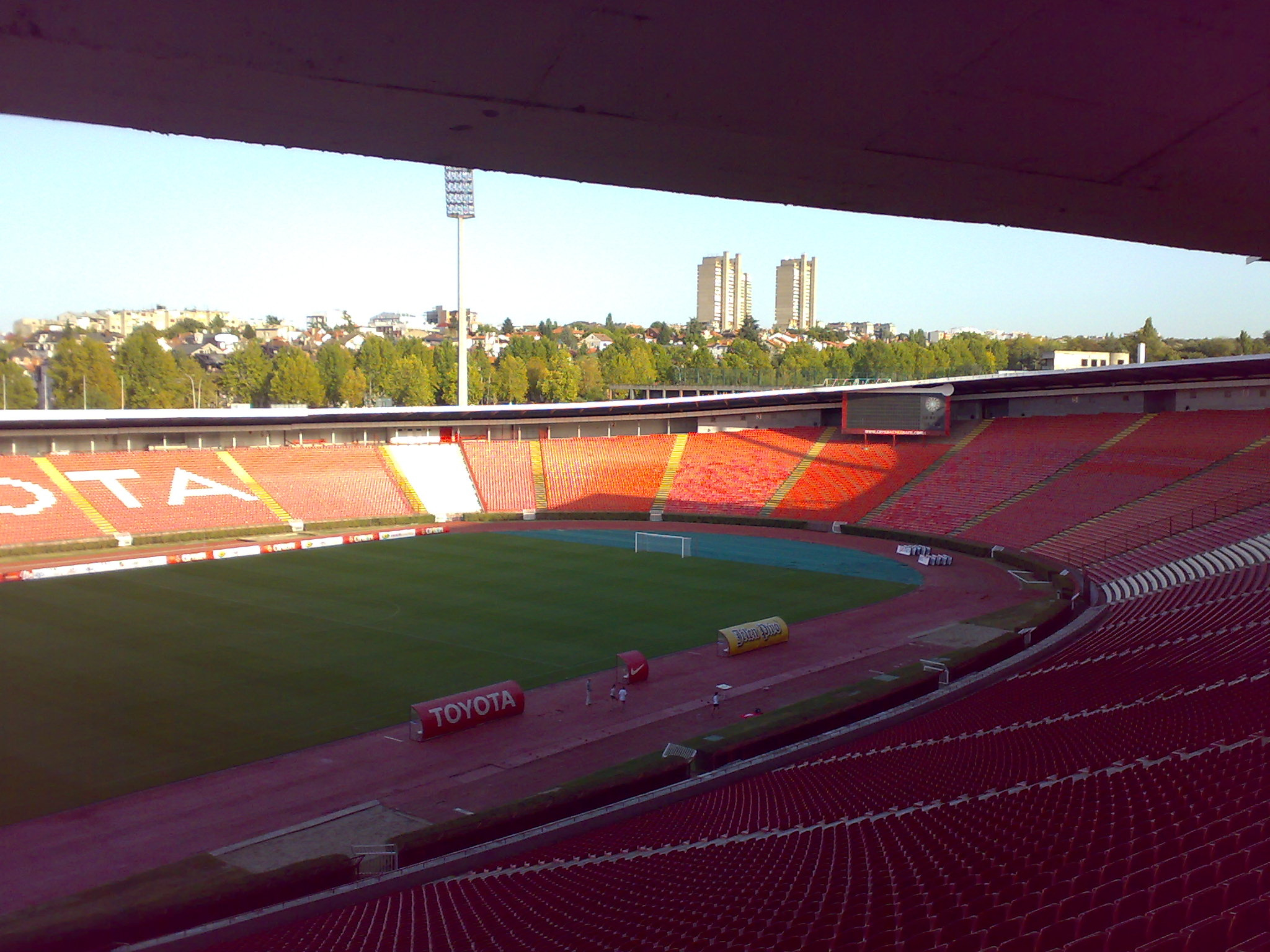
Rajko Mitić Stadium, known as "Marakana"

The end of the fifties was the first period of dominance of one club in the Yugoslav football scene, but by the beginning of the next decade the focus of events shifted to the other side of Topčider Hill, where Partizan was located. In the following seven seasons, Red Star managed to win only one championship and only one cup, which was not enough for a club of Red Star's stature and ambitions. Its placement during these seasons was the worst in its history (including a seventh-place finish in 1963). Red Star even dropped four times below the first three in the table (before and after that, Red Star has never dropped below third place in 54 football seasons in the SFRY, FRY, SCG and Serbia). Even then, it was clear that Red Star was the most popular club in the country by far, and its defeats came down hard on its supporters. So, on some occasions, Red Star supporters had the tendency to burst onto the field and literally burn both goal-posts. In the 1963 season, the club only managed to score 21 goals, which was, for example, half the amount that Vojvodina scored, although they finished five places lower in the table.

On the other hand, Red Star achieved good results on the international stage. In the 1961–62 Inter-Cities Fairs Cup, Red Star eliminated Espanyol in the quarter-final and for the semi-final, Red Star had to play against F.C. Barcelona. In both matches Barcelona turned out to be the better team and Red Star was eliminated. However, only eight months later, the Catalan club was defeated by Red Star in the same stage of the same competition. But even a 2–0 victory against A.S. Roma was not enough for Red Star to progress.

Next to the international successes, Red Star continue to develop and building of a new stadium commenced in Belgrade at the end of 1959. In the following four years, Red Star played home-games in Partizan's stadium and the stadium of OFK Belgrade (this can be considered as one of the reason's for the bad results it achieved during this period). The new stadium was opened in 1963 and Red Star played against NK Rijeka, and in the course of time a sold-out Red Star Stadium received the unofficial moniker "the Marakana", after the famous Maracanã stadium in Brazil, and the stadium garnered a reputation of being a very tough ground for visiting teams to play in. During the first season of the stadium's existence, Red Star celebrated winning a double crown, seeing Milorad Pavić coach them to these victories. A key moment took place in 1966, when Miljan Miljanić became the club's coach. For the following eight years, Miljanić transformed Red Star into a highly rated European side. Up to then, Yugoslav football had gone through an introductory testing stage and the dominance of Red Star and Partizan continued. In the remaining 25 years of Yugoslavia's existence, Red Star would remain a constant trophy-favorite, only their opponents would change. In 1968, Red Star won its second Mitropa Cup trophy and after winning Red Star withdrew from the Mitropa Cup in order to focus more on other European competitions.

=== Miljanić era (1966–1975) ===
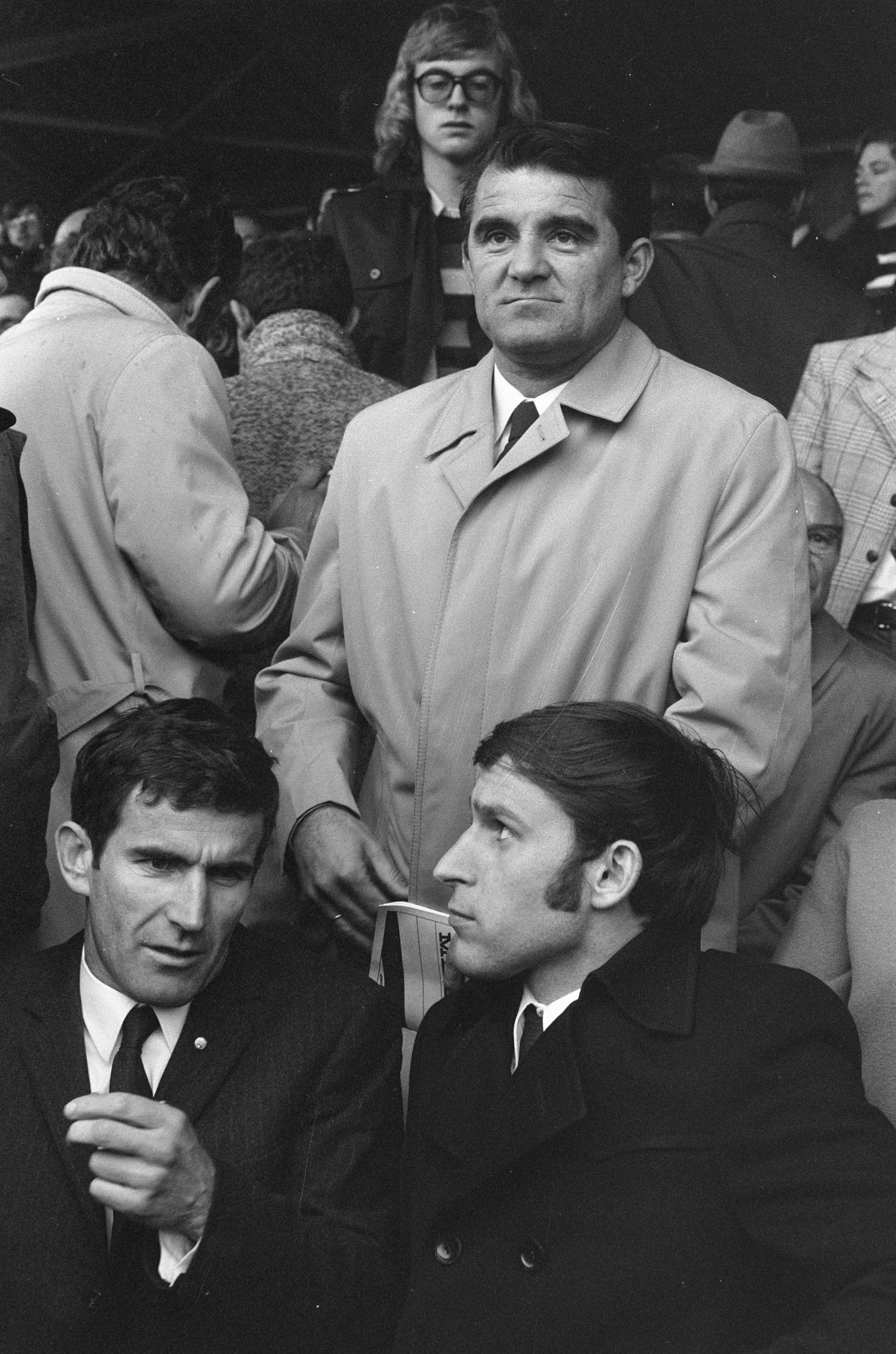
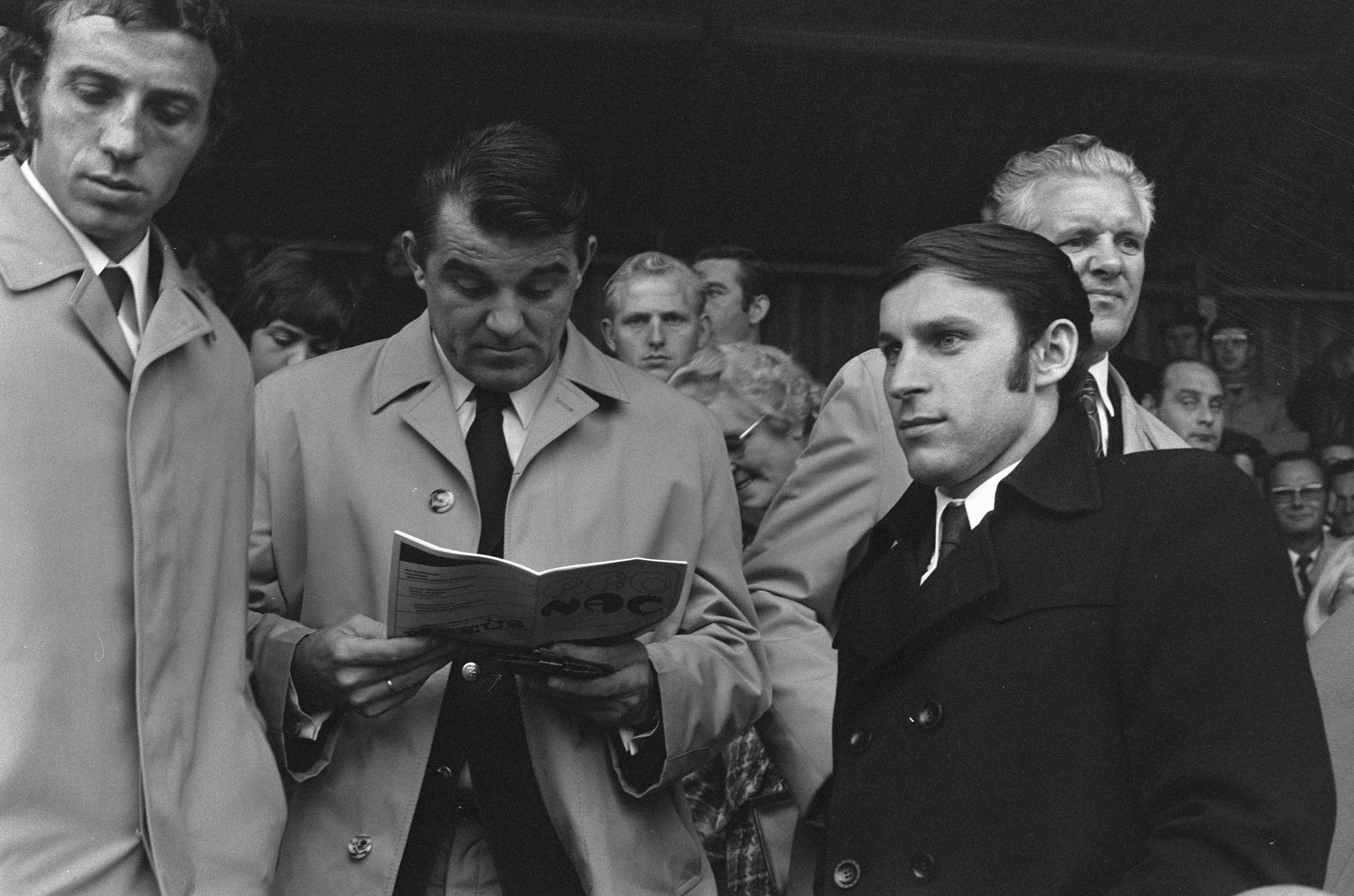
Miljan Miljanić—shown here in Breda with Red Star's star player Dragan Džajić in October 1971 doing some last-minute in-person scouting of their upcoming Cup Winners' Cup opponents Sparta Rotterdam—coached the Belgrade club for eight consecutive seasons, a period during which he brought up a new generation of players (many of them homegrown through the club's youth system) and led them to 4 Yugoslav league titles, 3 national cup wins, and a number of notable European results including 1970–71 European Cup semifinal.

Having come up through the club's youth system, Miljan Miljanić made a handful of appearances for Red Star's full squad during the early 1950s before unceremoniously ending his modest career as a footballer; however, it was decade and a half later, in the summer of 1966, once he went into coaching that he began finding success. In his first season as Red Star's head coach, Miljanić completely changed the club's lineup of players, finishing fifth in the league, same as the previous season's finish under previous head coach Ivan Toplak.

The following season, a generation led by twenty-one-year-old Dragan Džajić—who was later officially voted the best ever Serbian player and generally considered one of the best left wingers in world football—began to leave a deep mark on Yugoslav and Serbian football. With players such as Ratomir Dujković, Milovan Đorić, Kiril Dojčinovski, Stanislav Karasi, Jovan Aćimović, Vojin Lazarević, Petar Krivokuća, Stevan Ostojić, and Branko Klenkovski, the 1967—1970 period marked the very first time Red Star managed to win three league titles consecutively, as well as two league-cup doubles. Simultaneously Red Star became an accomplished and consistent performer on the European stage as well. It was focusing on the Yugoslav Cup in 1971 that led to the club making its second worst league placement ever – sixth place – however, that impression was improved by winning the cup. Red Star also won two Supercups in 1969 and 1971. Next to the cup victory, Red Star also made it to the semi-finals of the 1970–71 European Cup, where they were eliminated by Greek side Panathinaikos. In the first match, Red Star, roared on by a vociferous Belgrade crowd, beat the Greeks 4–1 in front of 100,000 spectators and looked to be in a dominant position, until they went down 3–0 in Athens and thus lost out on away goals and missed again the final. Miljanić won another Yugoslav Cup with the team in 1973. Some new players emerged, such as Vladimir and Ognjen Petrović, Bogićević, Filipović, Janković and Keri.

During the eight years of Miljanić's leadership, seven times it was the top-scoring club in Yugoslavia (in 1972 Velež scored one goal more), and in the last two seasons Red Star won the league title first by 12, and then by 18 points advantage over its closest rivals in the table. In the 1973–74 European Cup, Red Star eliminated Liverpool (the reigning champions at the time). By defeating Liverpool, Red Star became only the second foreign team that could beat Liverpool on the Anfield Road (after Ferencváros in the 1967–68 Inter-Cities Fairs Cup) and the only side to defeat Liverpool at home in the European Cup in the entire 20th century. However, Red Star lost the following quarter-final fixture against Atlético Madrid 0–2 on aggregate. Next season, in 1975, Red Star faced Real Madrid. The match was declared to be the Džajić vs. Camacho game by the press, because Dragan Džajić was the best left winger in the world at that time and Camacho was one of the best defenders. In the first leg, Red Star was awaited at the Santiago Bernabeu by Miljan Miljanić, now coaching Real, as well as by 125,000 fans, and was defeated by a score of 2–0. In Belgrade, Red Star managed to level the score on aggregate in front of 100,000 spectators by goals from Džajić and goalkeeper Petrović. Red Star finally won 6–5 on penalties and achieved for the first time the semi-final of the European Cup Winners' Cup. There, the team played against Ferencváros from Budapest. Red Star lost to Ferencváros by a score of 2–1, and the return game will always being remembered as the game with the biggest attendance at Red Star Stadium. Although 96,070 tickets were sold, it is estimated that about 110,000 people were in attendance. The match concluded as a penalty-kick converted in the 83rd minute placed the scoreline at 2–2 and put Ferencváros into the final.

=== Maintaining dominance – the first European Final (1976–1986) ===
As it usually happens, when a successful coach leaves, this entails a drop in results, and the two seasons after Miljanić left passed less successfully for Red Star. It was not before the arrival of Gojko Zec in 1976 that the club achieved stability and soon Red Star celebrated winning the national championship at the Marakana. It was an introduction into the era of Branko Stanković, whose reign as head coach was to last four years and bring Red Star three trophies and the first great European final. After Dragan Džajić had moved to Bastia, the team was led by the fourth star of Red Star Belgrade, Vladimir Petrović "Pižon", Dušan Savić "Dule" and Srboljub Stamenković, who was to become a great football star in the United States later on in his career. The first season with Gojko Zec at the helm was quite literally a real demonstration of force – the league was won with an advantage of nine points over all rivals, which was, up to that moment, the biggest margin of victory in the history of the league. Red Star's strikers, led by Zoran Filipović, scored 67 times against their rivals in the league (the first to accompany them on the list was Borac Banja Luka with 53 goals scored during the season). In the following season, Red Star finished second in the league, paving the way for a great performance in the 1978–1979 season of the UEFA Cup. After eliminating teams like Arsenal, West Bromwich and Hertha BSC, Red Star achieved for the first time the Cup final. And there, Red Star met on Borussia Mönchengladbach, which played five European finals from 1973 to 1980. The Germans, awaited about 100,000 fiery supporters, fall in residues by a goal from Miloš Šestić, but Jurišić's gave Gladbach a psychological advantage before the rematch. This game was played at the Rheinstadion in Düsseldorf, where Italian referee gave a questionable penalty to the Germans, and the Danish player Allan Simonsen sealed Red Star's fate. The Foals won 2–1 on aggregate. The first championship for Stanković as a coach (as a player he was a champion for four times) was won in 1980, when Red Star missed double crown, and a year later Red Star was the champion again. An eleven-year period without winning the cup, the longest in its history by far, ended in the spring of 1982, where Red Star beat Dinamo Zagreb 6–4 on aggregate (2–2 in Zagreb and 4–2 in Belgrade). By that time, the first change in head coach during a season took place since the fifties, Stevan Ostojić replaced Stanković. In this period, Red Star reached two times the quarter-finals of the European Cup. In 1981, they were eliminated by Inter, and in 1982 by RSC Anderlecht.

It followed historical matches against Udo Lattek's Barcelona during the 1982–83 European Cup Winners' Cup. In both matches Barcelona was the better team and Red Star was finally eliminated. Remarkably was, when Barça's Maradona scored his second goal in front of about 100,000 spectators at Marakana, the Belgrade audience were so excited about the goal, that even the loyal Belgrade fans applauded Maradona, till there unimaginable. Gojko Zec returns to the team in 1983, finding only one player from the champions generation he was coaching back in 1977 – Miloš Šestić. Zec similarly repeated the team's triumph from his previous mandate by winning the championship immediately upon his arrival. And in the same manner as during that season, the cup finals ended in Split, where Red Star again bat Dinamo Zagreb to lift the cup trophy. Especially after Petrović and Savić had left during 1982/83 season, Šestić became a leader of the new generation, the players like Ivković, Elsner, Boško and Milko Đurovski, Musemić, Milovanović, Janjanin and Mrkela. Bringing experienced players from all over Yugoslavia proved to be a formula of success. The end of the era of Gojko Zec coincided with the greatest scandal in the history of Yugoslav football, a Scheiber’s case, that made the country have two champions in two seasons. Red Star first lost and then won the championship in 1986, before it was taken away from it at the green table. However, in 1986, Red Star achieved also the quarter-finals of European Cup Winners' Cup, but lost against Atlético Madrid.

=== European and World Champions (1986–1991) ===
In 1986, there were great changes in the club. The management of the club, run by Dragan Džajić and Vladimir Cvetković, began to build a team that could compete with some of the most powerful European side. During that summer, Velibor Vasović became coach and the side was strengthened by acquiring a number of talented young players, among whom Dragan Stojković and Borislav Cvetković stood out. In the first season that started with penalty points, Red Star focused on the European Cup and achieving good results. In 1987, a five-year plan was developed by the club and Professor-Doctor Veljko Aleksić with the only goal being to win the European Cup. All that was planned was finally achieved. On the club's birthday in 1987, it started. Real Madrid were defeated at Marakana. From that day through to March 1992, Red Star enjoyed the best period of success in its history. In these five seasons, Red Star won four National Championships (in the 1989, Vojvodina won the championship with Šestić, Mihajlović, Ljupko Petrović as coach and Kosanović as director). At the end of the 1989/90 season, Red Star finished with an 11-point advantage over all of their opponents in the league. A year later, they finished with an eight-point advantage compared to their closest rivals (both times it was Dinamo). All four seasons in which Red Star won the championships, it also played in the finals of the National Cup, however, they won the Cup only in 1990. The fact that Red Star was managed by as many as five coaches during these glorious five years (Vasović, Stanković, Šekularac, Petrović and Popović) seems strange to some, but at the same time it acts as a confirmation of the power of the red-whites both in management and on the field. In 1987, Binić and Prosinečki signed for Red Star, it followed Šabanadžović, Pančev, Savićević, Belodedici and Mihajlović. From the youth school was brought Stojanović and Jugović to the first squad. At the very beginning of the nineties, Red Star, fired by the goals of Pančev, trashed the competition in domestic contests, and in Europe it was ranked among the very best. They won unbeaten the 1991 European Cup in Bari and the 1991 Intercontinental Cup in Tokyo. The following the start of the Yugoslav wars, the disintegration of Yugoslavia and sanctions imposed by the UN on FR Yugoslavia, accelerated the process, which would, only thirteen months after the victory in Bari, practically leave Red Star without its entire generation of European and World champions and left the big question how many titles would this generation have won.

=== Road to Bari (1990–1991) ===
The years up to 1991 were arguably the most important and successful years in the history of Red Star Belgrade, during which the club won its first European Cup and Intercontinental Cup.

==== Master plan – the birth of the European giant ====
Since the mid-eighties, plans for winning the European Cup were made at Marakana. During the previous two decades, Red Star had achieved results by forming the team out of its youth players and by bringing talented footballers from other Yugoslav clubs into the team. The new Red Star management, led by Dragan Džajić, decided to take a different pathway. They opted for choosing the best Yugoslav players in order to create a team which could compete at continental level, and even become a candidate for the European trophy. In 1986, a first step in the new direction was taken by adding Borislav Cvetković, Milivoj Bračun and Slobodan Marović, as well as by bringing along one of the greatest Yugoslav football players - Dragan Stojković "Piksi" from Radnički Niš. A year after this, "Piksi" was followed by Dragiša Binić and goalkeeper Stevan Stojanović, who came through Red Star's youth ranks. In 1987 they defeated Real Madrid, with its stars Hugo Sánchez and Emilio Butragueño, in the quarter-finals of the 1986–87 European Cup season at the Marakana by 4–2, but "the Royals" had only knocked Red Star out on away goals (Real won in Madrid by 2–0). Red Star continues to build its "Dream Team" and Dinamo was left without their most gifted player – Robert Prosinečki, who later won the 1987 FIFA World Youth Championship with Yugoslavia, including the award as the tournament's best player. It followed the new Yugoslav representative and defender Refik Šabanadžović. In 1988, Dejan Savićević and Darko Pančev, the best remaining players, signed for the Red & Whites, as well as Ilija Najdoski. In 1988–89 European Cup season, Red Star played against Arrigo Sacchi's A.C. Milan with its Dutch European champions trio Gullit, van Basten and Rijkaard, considered superstars at that time, as well as the defensive stars Baresi, Maldini, Costacurta and Tassotti. Milan was then the power in football and the principal challenge for the club, but at San Siro, Red Star managed a well-deserved 1–1 draw.

In Belgrade, Savićević led the team to put Red Star ahead in front of 100,000 fanatical Red Star fans. Yet, Milan were saved when the game was abandoned in 64th minute by referee after due to thick fog. Due to extremely poor visibility it was decided that the match couldn't continue that day. The match was then voided and the game was replayed the next day. Striker van Basten gave Milan a first half lead, but Stojković equalised soon afterwards and there were no further goals. Milan progressed to the quarter-finals after winning the penalty shoot-out by 4–2, and won at the end also the European Cup.

==== The circle closes ====
Even though the coaches switched each year, Red Star managed to maintain a game-style based on quick strikers and top quality midfielders and was almost excluded in its first attempt. In 1989, in a duel with Vojvodina from Novi Sad, Red Star lost the title, which later had tremendous impact on the game. Therefore, another attempt to take the European throne was dedicated to winning the UEFA Cup. In 1989, after eliminating Galatasaray and Žalgiris, came one of the crucial days on the Red Star's journey to Bari. Šekularac's team was severely defeated and eliminated during the third round of the UEFA Cup against Littbarski's 1.FC Köln, thus learning a key lesson in competitive soccer - the hard way. In Belgrad, Red Star won in front of (as so often in those days) 100,000 spectators by two goals from Savićević, but they went down 3–0 in Cologne, although Red Star controlled the game for the whole hour. Pieces of a puzzle continued to fit with former European Cup winner Miodrag Belodedici. In 1988, when Ceauşescu was still in power, Belodedici defected from Romania to Yugoslavia and Red Star immediately signed him. Romanian authorities forged his professional player contract, and UEFA suspended him on the basis of data furnished. In 1989, Belodedici was given the green light to play for Red Star. In 1990, Šekularac was replaced by Ljupko Petrović, the man who took away the title from Red Star only a year before with Vojvodina. He brought Red Stars's talented junior Vladimir Jugović to the first team (and soon Mihajlović from rivals Vojvodina). The club was seriously weakened by the departure of captain Stojković, who was undoubtedly among the best World players that year, which he proved at the 1990 FIFA World Cup. Stojković left Red Star for Marseille, not even assuming that he won't see his fellow-players before next May. Although without a captain, Red Star stayed extremely strong and well covered at each position. Red Star easily won the championship, and the time came for this carefully assembled equipe to prove itself at the highest level. Even if political situation at that time make this to a difficult thing.

==== First spectacle – the Grasshopper Blues ====
Jersey worn by Red Star during the 1990/91 season

In the First round of 1990–91 European Cup, the draw placed the Grasshoppers from Zürich on Red Star Belgrade's path. The Swiss club, led by coach Hitzfeld and its stars Sutter and Sforza, shocked Marakana with Közle's leading score, while Binić, who returned to Red Star in the summer (after two years abroad), managed to even the score. With the result being 1-1, Red Star had a difficult starting position, but the revanch at Hardturm stadium showed the real abilities of Petrović's team. Prosinečki, who won the Best Young Player Award on 1990 FIFA World Cup, started a series of scores in the European Cup, by netting the rival two times, which two more scores were gained by Pančev and Duško Radinović. Therefore, another Közle's goal didn't upset anyone. Red Star defeat Grasshopper Zürich overwhelming 5–2 over to legs. The second round provided a real spectacle at Red Star Stadium, due to the fact that Scottish record-winner Rangers were visiting Belgrade. The Blues wanted a good result on this day. Nevertheless, the overcrowded Marakana with its supporters, the Delije, inspired Red Star players to perform another magnificent match, during which chances came one after another. Within minutes, in addition to Brown scoring an own goal, Prosinečki's free kick score doubled the advantage. Finally, Pančev provided a definite 3-0 result which led to an outburst of joy. During the return match at Ibrox Park, Pančev punished the rival again by using the attractive scissors-technique, after which the legendary McCoist was only able to even the result. Red Star demonstrated their power and the 1–1 draw in Glasgow brought Red Star a 4-1 aggregate master class.

==== German tour – from Dresden to Munich ====
Red Star continued their impressive form into the quarter-finals. The club began a German tour, enhanced by Siniša Mihajlović from reigning Yugoslav champion Vojvodina (who was then being paid one million Deutch marks, for that time this was a lot of money) against the last East Germany champion Dynamo Dresden. The match was highly anticipated and at hell Marakana, scenery was the same as the one against Glasgow – a rival was overrun in front of incredible 100,000 Red Star fans (in front of the stadium further 20,000) and sent back home, following a 3-0 result. Even Prosinečki's free kick scored again, and Binić and Savićević won the rest of the points, just like before. The atmosphere at this day was one of the best in the history of Red Star matches. The Dresden match had a bad beginning, the East Germans sparked hopes when they scored after only three minutes by Gütschow. However, a difference in game quality was soon noticed - Savićević and Pančev managed to reverse the result. The match was stopped in the 78th minute by the referee, due to Dynamo Dresden fans causing commotion in the stands and throwing objects onto the field. UEFA awarded a 3–0 win to Red Star, 6–0 on aggregate, and Red Star reached the European Cup semifinal for the third time in history, where they met FC Bayern Munich with its World champions.

Red Star's starting lineup against Bayern Munich in Belgrade. (coach: Ljupko Petrović).

Although Red Star experience with Bayern was bad, (two sequential losses a decade earlier), the club was dominated by optimism, mostly outspread by Red Star legend and director Džajić, who had announced a victory in Munich. Wohlfahrt's score only temporarily gave Bayern the advantage, because Red Star took the initiative at Olympic stadium and struck back. Just before the half-time break, Prosinečki passed the ball to Binić, a quick run and a cross at the last goal-post followed, in addition, Pančev accepted the ball – the result was 1-1. Then, on 70 minutes, the Red Star defence broke down a Bayern attack and Pančev served Savićević perfectly, who ran from centre to the penalty area, and was untouchable for Kohler and Aumann, the result was 1-2 and about 15,000 Red Star fans on the north tribune celebrated the victory. Remarkably is, that Red Star was the first team that could beat Bayern on the Olympic Stadium in its long UEFA competition history. However, a gate on the road to trophy began to open-up and this was just the beginning. The Bayern was awaited by the Delije with a historical flare show around the whole Red Star Stadium. But soon, Yugoslavia was in fact on the brink of civil war, it straddled the first firefight of the war, as Croat extremists fired three Ambrust missiles into Borovo Selo on the border with Serbia, the village where Red Star midfielder Mihajlović grew up. And exactly he increased Red Star's advantages in Belgrade by a first half free-kick by two points.

Agony started when Augenthaler's free-kick went through Stojanović's arms and legs. Five minutes later, Bender scored for a 1-2 result. Bayern evened the result and didn't intend to stop there. In the last 30 minutes, chances came in a row in front of both goals. As the game entered its final seconds, Red Star attacked for one final time. Then came the historical moment, Jugović conducted the ball along the diagonal and double-passed with Pančev. Prosinečki took over the ball, passed through the left side of the field and returned the ball to Mihajlović, after whose low cross into the penalty area Bayerns Augenthaler stuck out a leg to intercept, but succeeded only in sending the ball high into the air, Pančev confused Aumann, and it looped over his goalkeepers head and into the net. The sky opened, the stadium exploded and the amazing 100,000 Red Star fans were delirious. Red Star players and supporters went wild with delight for there was no time left for Bayern to come back again. The final whistle sparked off a huge celebration inside the stadium as well as a massive celebratory pitch invasion. The 4-3 aggregate win brought Red Star, after two semi finals, the first European Cup final in history, where waiting Olympique de Marseille.

==== European star ====
The 1991 European Cup Final was played in Bari. Red Star coach Petrović brought the team to Italy a week before the finals, in order to prepare the players for a forthcoming encounter with Olympique. By that time, Red Star had 18 scores at 8 matches, whereas the French champion had 20. Therefore, the 100th European competing final was expected to be a spectacle of offense. Nonetheless, both Petrović and Goethals opted for a defence and the match settled down into a war of attrition. After a 120-minute game and only few chances on both sides, the decision was made following the penalty shootout. Prosinečki hit Olmeta's net by a right medium-high-kick, while Stojanović defended Red Star goal from Amoros’ kick by bouncing to the right, during the first series. It showed later that this was the crucial point of the game. Then came the scores, in the following order: Binić, Casoni, Belodedici, Papin, Mihajlović and Mozer. A chance to triumph got Darko Pančev, the winner of the European Golden Boot – he aimed near the centre of the goal, kicked the ball, converted and brought the European Cup to Yugoslavia for the first time. Red Star won the shootout 5-3 on 29 May 1991 in front of 60,000 spectators and the millions watching on television around the world. 20,000 Red Star fans at Stadio San Nicola and millions of them all over Yugoslavia and the World celebrate the greatest joy in Red Star's history. The night of the 1991 European Cup Final was one of the final times that Yugoslavia could come together to celebrate as one.

==== Prepared in England, made in Japan ====

Red Star's starting lineup in Tokyo. (coach: Vladica Popović)

As European champion, Red Star Belgrade played for European Super Cup trophy, as well as for the Intercontinental Cup, who held for decades in Tokyo, in the far Japan. At that time, the Super Cup consisted of two matches. However, there was only one match against Manchester United, held at Old Trafford, due to war which had already begun in Yugoslavia. In spite of the fact that Red Star Belgrade controlled the largest part of the 1991 European Super Cup final, and the fact that Savićević glittered at the "Theatre of Dreams", the only goal was scored by McClair.

In Tokyo, Red Star looked for a chance to finish the year with another international trophy. There, its rival was Chile's Colo Colo, the Copa Libertadores winner. On Santiago de Chile's team bench was Mirko Jozić, under whose leadership Yugoslavia became a Youth World Champion, and Prosinečki, who was the World's best among those of his age. However, Prosinečki left the team right after winning the European Champion title (sold for €15 million to Real Madrid, one of the most expensive transfers at this time), just as Stojanović, Marović, Šabanadžović and Binić did. During the 1991 Intercontinental Cup final, Jugović, the youngest regular of the club, scores two goals at National Stadium and a brilliant play over the entire field brought him later the Toyota prize, which was intended for the best player of match. The superiority of Red Star was so oppressive, that even after the exclusion of Savićević just before the half time, another comfortable victory could be retracted. At the time of the red card, Belgrade were already 1-0 ahead by Jugović. However, another goal was gained by him and Pančev, which brought Red Star the final score of 3–0. On 8 December 1991, Red Star had everything that a football club can achieve, it was both the European Champion as well as the World Champion and was at the height of its fame.

=== The dark nineties (1992–2000) ===
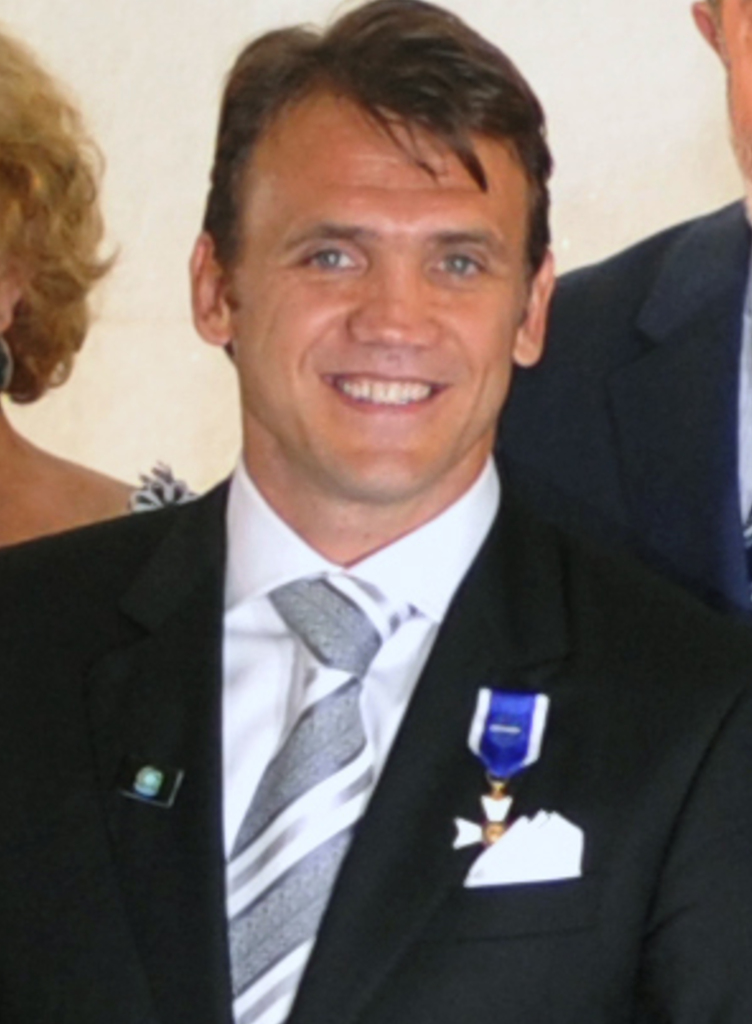
Dejan Petković wore the Red Star jersey 132 times.

In 1992, the club was weakened by the departure of almost the whole champions generation (new players were later added, such as Drobnjak and Ivić). In addition, Red Star had to defend the trophy out of their country due to the war in former Yugoslavia (not even in Serbia, although there was possible), thereby reducing their chances of defending their title. The UEFA changed the form of the championship that year and instead of the cup they started the 1991–92 Champions League, in which eight best teams from the continent participated. On their way to the group stage, Red Star beat Portdown in Szegedin and Apollon Limassol, and as their opponents in the group they got Sampdoria, R.S.C. Anderlecht and Panathinaikos. It all started with the defeat 0–2 at Marassi, the first after 17 matches (the fifth longest series without defeat in the elite European competition), after which Anderlecht was defeated in Budapest, and Panathinaikos in Athens and Sofia. The key game Red Star played against Sampdoria in Sofia, when they lost the 1–0 lead and were defeated 1–3, with the Italian club winning the place in the final. The end of a long era, in which Red Star have, in 22 years, progressed 11 times to the spring rounds in Europe and played 24 successive seasons in one of the European competitions, ended in Brussels, where Red Star were defeated 3–2 in a match without any significance for the competition.

In domestic competition, rival, Dinamo, left the league, just as all the other clubs from Croatia, Macedonia and Slovenia did, and the championship in a Yugoslavia that was cut in size was played on the edge of observance of regulations, because, in April, the war broke out in Bosnia and Herzegovina. At the end of May the UN had the country under sanctions and dislodging Yugoslav football from the international scene, the slogan - politics has no place in sport - was not considered here. The disintegration of Yugoslavia, the civil war (1992–1995), the inflation and the UN sanctions have hit Red Star hard. However, they defended its title and for the second time made a champion hat-trick (for the first time since the era of Miljanić), but at the Cup's finals, won by Partizan, it was already clear that hard days for the club were ahead. It followed a series of victories by the Black & Whites. The 14th cup arrived to the glass closet in 1995, and it was brought by another generation of great players, such as Dejan and Jovan Stanković, Kovačević, Ognjenović, Đorović, Stefanović, Sakić, Živković, Krupniković, Petković, Milojević and Stojkovski. Heading for the title, the legendary 100th Belgrade derby was also won in front of 80,000 spectators by goals from Kovačević and Stojkovski with 2–1, and Petrović was again sitting on the bench. Still, it was a short break during unsuccessful years, and under new and strange circumstances it was difficult for the club to find the right way. As the nineties were approaching their end, the 1998/99 championship was not finalized due to the Kosovo War, and Red Star finished at the third place, which was the club's only placement below the second position in the league in the previous 20 years. In the period between May 1992 and May 2000, only one championship victory was celebrated at Marakana. However, they did manage to win five cups, along with several glorious European performances.

==== Return to Europe – on the hard tour (1995–1996) ====
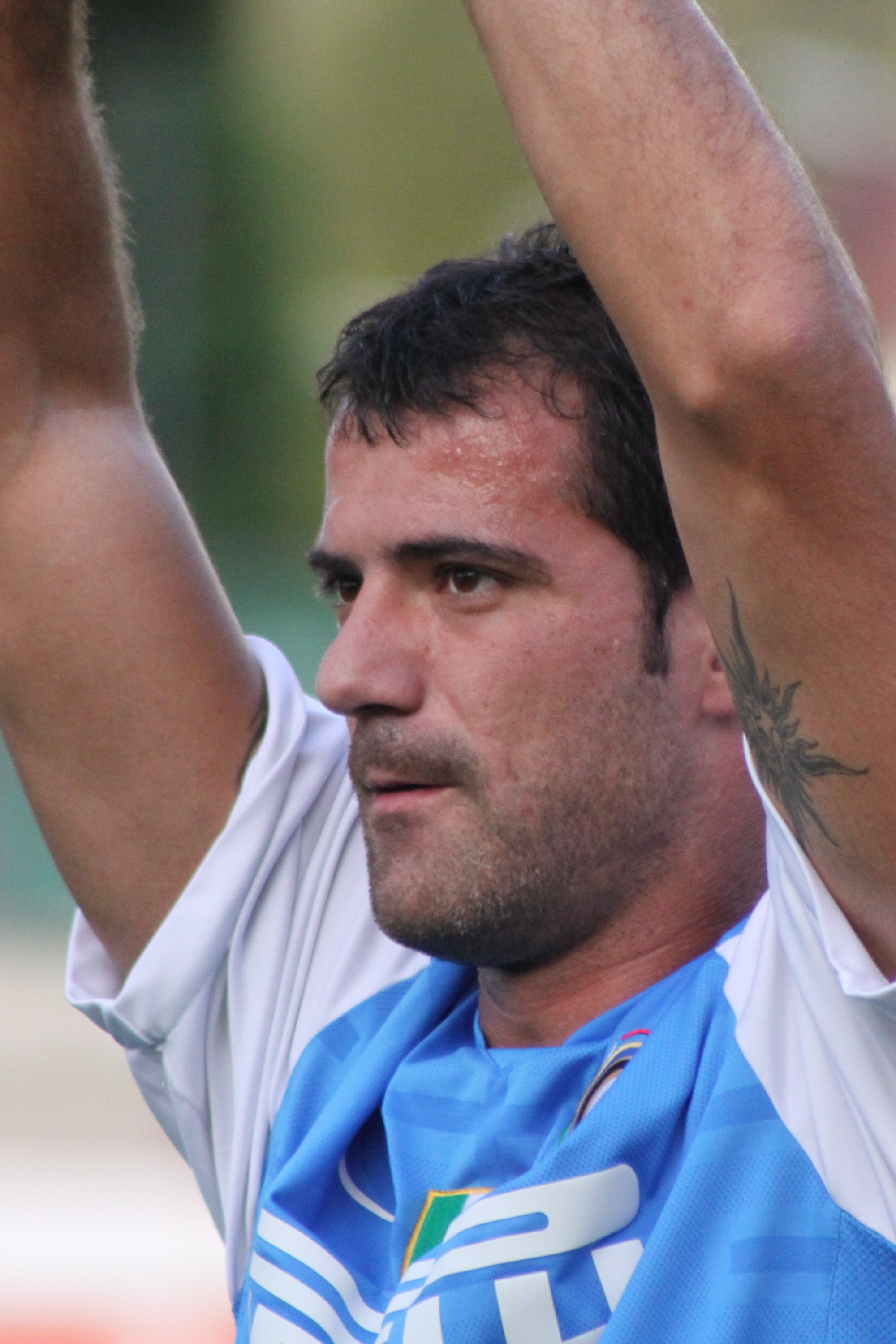
Dejan Stanković was the youngest captain ever in Red Star's history.

During the 1994/1995 season, the UEFA and FIFA accepted Yugoslav football clubs back, but while the national team continued where they had stopped in the spring of 1992, the clubs had all their results erased and were treated as the beginners in the European competitions. That's how Red Star, the European Champion in 1991, the group participant in 1992 and among the last sixteen in 1990, (all three years counted while deciding upon the seeded teams in the summer of 1995), was placed to the bottom of the list and instead of the place in the Champions League (as the Champion of FR Yugoslavia in 1995) was moved to the UEFA Cup. That decision will have long-term catastrophic consequences for Red Star – instead of enjoying the merits of its own many-year work and getting to the group phase of the Champions League over easier rivals, they would get harder opponents from the start and the competition would start already in July. The first international game was a friendly match against Olympiacos, which was won by 4–1 at Marakana. A large flag with "Welcome Orthodox Brothers" was a welcome gesture to Greek fans and players. Since the match, exist a friendship between these two clubs and their fans. The first European competition match upon the return Red Star played on August 8, 1995 against Swiss Xamax. 60,000 fans came to greet the new generation which, in spite of all the problems, had great ambitions, but after a sequence of missed chances, they were punished by a last minute goal. In the rematch there were no goals, so Red Star's season ended in the first round, which never happened before.

The second season in Europe was more successful than the first. Under new coach Vladimir Petrović and with a new generation of players such as Stanković, Ognjenović, Njeguš and Jevrić, Red Star started the 1996–97 UEFA Cup Winners' Cup with the elimination of Hearts, and after a minimal defeat in Kaiserslautern, came the night that ended with three goals for Red Star in extra time. The award for the 4–0 victory was the duel with F.C. Barcelona. The Catalans, studded with stars like Ronaldo, Figo and Stoichkov, was the strongest team, which they affirmed by winning the Cup. However, Red Star lost in Barcelona by 3–1. Later in Belgrade, Barça fell behind Red Star led by a goal from Jovičić, but Giovanni equalized, which was enough for Barcelona. The atmosphere at Marakana was probably one of the best in the last years, with magnificent choreography and the panorama of Belgrade in the west stand.

=== New century (1999–2004) ===
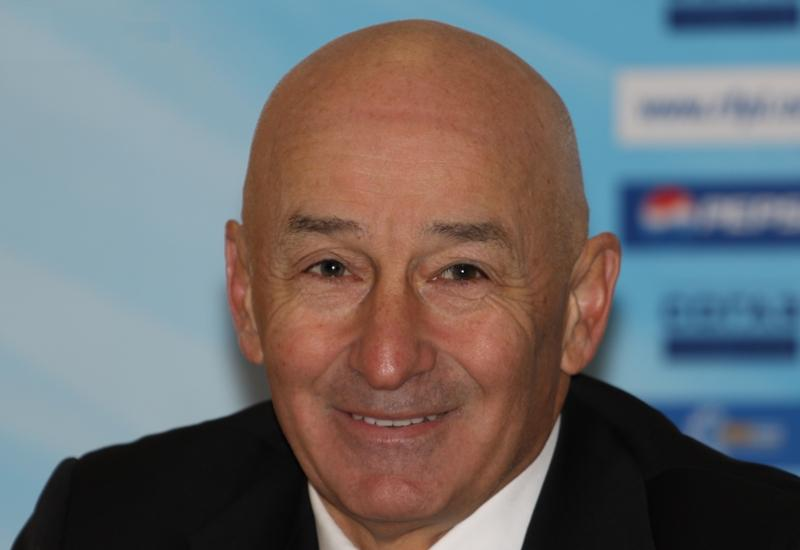
Muslin, former coach of Red Star.

Shortly after the NATO bombing of Yugoslavia ended, Red Star won the 1999 Cup final in a 4–2 victory over Partizan. After four matches into the 1999–2000 season, coach Miloljub Ostojić was sacked and replaced by Slavoljub Muslin. By the end of the half-season, Red Star was in third place; six points behind Obilić and four behind Partizan. Red Star went on to finish the season in first place with a record of 33-6-1 (wins-ties-losses), with Goran Bunjevčević as captain and Mihajlo Pjanović as the team's top scorer as well as the second highest goalscorer in the league. Red Star also won the 2000 Cup.

That summer, Red Star Belgrade made it for the first time to the reformed qualifications for the Champions League. In the third qualifying round of the 2000–01 UEFA Champions League, Red Star was eliminated by Dynamo Kyiv on away goals and proceeded to the 2000–01 UEFA Cup first round, where they played Leicester City. They tied 1–1 in the first leg, although coach Muslin got in a bitter conflict with Leicester coach Peter Taylor. Both coaches claimed that they were verbally abused by one another and refused to shake each other's hands after the match. Then UEFA decided that the second leg planned for 21 September 2000 would not be played in Belgrade after not approving of Red Star's guarantees of the guests' safety. Otherwise, the match was supposed to have taken place three days before the election in Yugoslavia, which was concluded by the overthrow of Slobodan Milošević. Red Star ended up beating Leicester 3–1 in the second leg held in Vienna, although the tensions were very high and Leicester players Ade Akinbiyi and Andrew Impey were racially abused by some Red Star fans. Red Star were then eliminated by Celta de Vigo in the second round.

A new try followed during 2001–02 UEFA Champions League, when they played against Bayer from Leverkusen (0-0 and 0–3 in away), the later finalist. Muslin left the bench in September 2001, after which Red Star went on to lose two League Titles in a row. Another notable match in this period was the 1–1 draw against Lazio at Marakana during the 2002–03 UEFA Cup. On December 22, 2001, Red Star and the Yugoslavia national football team tragically lost one of its former players and the Delije one of their darlings – Jovan Gojković, who played for Red Star from 1997 till 2000, died in a car crash in Belgrade. He was only 26 years old. The return of Muslin to the club's bench in 2003, brought back the strength in leadership that was essential to Red Star. During this season, the club set a new record – conceding only 13 goals in 30 matches - and finally won the title. Many players contributed to these successes, some of them are Vidić, Ačimovič, Bunjevčević, Žigić, Bošković, Vitakić, Drulić, Kocić, Marković, Pjanović, Dišljenković, Dudić, Kovačević, Krivokapić, Perović, Mladenović and Milovanović.

=== Post-Yugoslav years (2004–2009) ===

Red Star's starting XI under coach Walter Zenga in their 3-1 UEFA Cup home match victory against Roma on 1 December 2005.

In the years after the dissolution of FR Yugoslavia, Red Star saw a total of five club presidents come and go from 2004 to 2009. This brought some volatility in Red Star's seasons. With Ljupko Petrović as coach for the third time in his career, Red Star finished in first place in the domestic league at the end of the 2003-2004 season. The 2004–05 season brought instability to Red Star, as president Dragan Džajić resigned on 1 October 2004. The Delije issued statements of support for Džajić. Red Star went on to finish second in the league behind Partizan and lost the 2005 Cup final in an upset by Železnik.

On 6 July 2005, Red Star's assembly overwhelmingly voted for Dragan Stojković to become the new club president. On 22 July 2005, Walter Zenga was selected to be Red Star's first ever foreign coach. In just one season, Zenga left a positive track in Red Star, as he coached them in their 2005–06 UEFA Cup campaign. Red Star played in Group E with Strasbourg, Roma, Basel, and Tromsø. Although they failed to make it past the group stage, on 1 December 2005 Red Star beat Roma 3–1, with two goals by Nikola Žigić. In the last season before Montenegro declared independence in 2006, Red Star finished in first place in the league.

Zenga left in May 2006, but his successor, Dušan Bajević, coached the team throughout most of the 2006–07 season, the first contemporary season in which only clubs from Serbia competed. Bajević's first competitive test as Red Star coach was daunting: in the third qualifying round of the 2006–07 UEFA Champions League, Red Star had the misfortune of drawing A.C. Milan, the eventual winners of that season's Champions League. The Rossoneri won 1–0 at San Siro, and later 2–1 at Red Star Stadium, and both games had a touch of the legendary matches from the late 1980s.

On 10 March 2007, Red Star lost 0–3 at home to Vojvodina, and after the Delije chanted "Dušan must go", Bajević infamously packed his bags and left the pitch even though the match had not even finished. Red Star still finished in first place at the end of that season. Boško Gjurovski was picked as Bajević's replacement, but after Red Star lost against Levadia in a second qualifying round match on 8 August 2007, the club administration pressured him to leave after only five months. Gjurovski was replaced by Milorad Kosanović, who had last coached Red Star in 1998. Kosanović coached the team to the 2007–08 UEFA Cup, where Red Star was drawn into Group F with Bayern Munich, Braga, Bolton Wanderers, and Aris. Less than two weeks before the group stage began, Dragan Stojković resigned as club president. He was replaced by Toplica Spasojević on 20 November 2007.

In their group stage opener, Red Star lost against Bayern 2–3 at home, with two goals for Bayern scored by a 17-year old Toni Kroos. The opener set the tone for the rest of the UEFA Cup campaign, and Kosanović resigned mid-season after Red Star lost to Aris 3–0 on 8 November 2007. Because of a continuing succession of coach changes, Red Star finished last in the group, losing every group stage match. Furthermore, they failed to defend the title from the previous season, as Red Star finished second behind Partizan in the domestic league at the end of the 2007–08 season. Red Star would not win the league again for another six years.

=== Crisis (2009–2015) ===
In April 2009, Red Star saw several executives come and go in quick succession due to an administrative and financial crisis. On 23 April 2009, Dan Tana resigned as president of Red Star. Less than a month later, the board of Red Star voted for Vladan Lukić to be the new club president. Opposition to Lukić in Red Star's assembly was significant; out of the 75 total votes cast, Lukić only recorded 30. On 3 June 2009, Vladimir "Pižon" Petrović was hired as Red Star's new coach ahead of the 2009–10 season. Although Red Star began that season well, the fall did not pass without controversy. On 30 October 2009, Serbia's state prosecutor Slobodan Radovanović pressed charges against Lukić for wearing a sweater with the lyrics of a song about hooliganism, and recommended that he no longer act as Red Star's president. Lukić defended himself by stating that he legally bought the sweater at a store and that the price he paid for the sweater included a state tax.

In early 2010, Red Star's financial situation was such that the club began accepting mobile-text donations to a fund called "Za moju Zvezdu" (for my Star). A number to which mobile phone users could send donation texts was put in place of where the general sponsor would be on Red Star's jersey. In spite of the financial crisis, Red Star had still maintained first place in the league table through most of the 2009–10 season. They were still two points ahead of Partizan in the league table when Red Star's board agreed to terminate Pižon's contract and replace him with Ratko Dostanić, two days after Red Star had lost 2–1 in an away match against Metalac Gornji Milanovac. Red Star ended up losing their first-place position after the Eternal Derby on 8 May 2010, which Partizan won 1–0 at their stadium by a long-range goal from Radosav Petrović. Red Star finished the 2009–10 season in second place of the domestic league table.

On 9 July 2010, Red Star signed a five-year general sponsorship contract with Gazprom Neft, although details of the contract's value were not disclosed to the public. One condition that Gazprom insisted on was that 23% of the new player contracts had to be awarded to Red Star's youth school.

On 19 December 2012, Red Star assembly members overwhelmingly voted for Džajić to be named president of Red Star again.

Red Star finished the 2013–14 season by winning their first domestic title in six years, but they were subsequently banned by UEFA from participating in the 2014–15 UEFA Champions League qualifying rounds due to breaching UEFA Club Licensing and Financial Fair Play Regulations. The UEFA ban had enormous consequences for Red Star's management and financial stability. Less than two weeks after UEFA announced the ban, Džajić resigned as president from Red Star. During a conference on sports economics sponsored by Danas, Džajić accused UEFA of holding double standards to Red Star:

"UEFA and FIFA do not hold equal standards to everyone. I don't understand why there isn't an A, B, or C tier, because one cannot compare Red Star and Real Madrid. Doesn't Manchester United play with €500 million in debt? When I came, I saw a debt of €50 million and made a goal to interrupt the domination of another club - Partizan. And whose sins am I paying for now? And to pay three or four million euros to UEFA every year? What kind of fair play is that in a country where the standard is like this?"

After the administrative committee of Red Star held elections on 10–11 December 2014, the committee of Red Star Belgrade named the uncontested candidate Svetozar Mijailović as the club president and gave Zvezdan Terzić a new mandate as the general director. In the same assembly session, the board decided to officially name Red Star's stadium as Stadion Rajko Mitić.

=== Stabilization and return to Europe (2017–present) ===
On 5 June 2017, Red Star formally presented Vladan Milojević as the new coach and Mitar Mrkela as the new sports director. That same summer, Red Star progressed through four qualifying rounds and finally qualified to the 2017–18 UEFA Europa League group stage for the first time in ten years. In Group H with Arsenal, 1. FC Köln, and BATE Borisov, Red Star finished second behind Arsenal, making the knockout stage of any UEFA competition for the first time after 25 years. Red Star's 2018 Europa League campaign finished in the Round of 32 after being eliminated by CSKA Moscow.

In the following season, Red Star again survived four qualifying rounds, this time qualifying to the 2018–19 UEFA Champions League group stage. In Group C with Paris Saint-Germain, Liverpool, and Napoli, Red Star finished last. However, Red Star recorded a 2-0 upset against Liverpool after a brace by Milan Pavkov. Liverpool went on to win the Champions League that season.

On 5 May 2019, Red Star beat Mladost Lučani 1–0, winning the league for the second consecutive season under coach Milojević and for the 29th time in club history. A few days later, the assembly of the Football Association of Serbia formally recognized Red Star's title of the 1946 federal Serbian league, which did not include teams from Vojvodina and was essentially a second tier behind Yugoslavia's premier championship at the time. As a result, Red Star's official number of domestic titles went from 29 to 30, and so a third star was added above Red Star's badge. Subsequently, Red Star progressed through four qualifying rounds to qualify for the 2019–20 UEFA Champions League, where they played in Group B with Bayern Munich, Tottenham Hotspur, and Olympiacos. Red Star finished last in the group.

Although Red Star continued to dominate in the Serbian league, their 2019–20 season was marred with instances of referee irregularities. On 14 September 2019, Red Star beat Inđija 2–1, but only after two penalties were given to Red Star in the 88th and 90th minutes. The first penalty was an error by the referee, as the foul in question had been committed outside of the penalty box. Mitar Mrkela acknowledged that the first penalty should not have been awarded, stating that "Red Star advocates for the urgent implementation of VAR technology in our league."
