= 1969–70 Yugoslav Cup =

1970 Yugoslav Football Cup
23rd Marshal Tito Cup

Tournament details
- Country: Yugoslavia
- Dates: 28 February – 27 May
- Teams: 16

Final positions
- Champions: Red Star (8th title)
- Runners-up: Olimpija
- Cup Winners' Cup: Olimpija

Tournament statistics
- Matches played: 16
- Goals scored: 31 (1.94 per match)
- Goals scored in penalty shoot-outs not included.

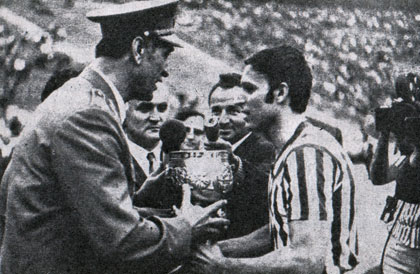

The 1969–70 Yugoslav Cup was the 23rd season of the top football knockout competition in SFR Yugoslavia, the Yugoslav Cup (Serbo-Croatian: Kup Jugoslavije), also known as the "Marshal Tito Cup" (Kup Maršala Tita), since its establishment in 1946.

== First round ==
Garnizon Krajlevo 2–3 Partizan

== Round of 16 ==
Crvena zvezda – Željezničar Sarajevo 1–0

OFK Beograd – Rudar Kakanj 2–0

Olimpija – Buducnost Peć 3–0

Orijent Rijeka – Dinamo Zagreb 0–1

Osijek – Vojvodina 1–3

Proleter Zrenjanin – Partizan 0–0 a.e.t. (4–3 pen.)

Radnički Niš – Sutjeska Nikšić 1–0

Vardar – Hajduk Split 1–1 a.e.t. (3–4 pen.)

== Quarter-finals ==
Dinamo Zagreb – Hajduk Split 1–0

OFK Beograd – Crvena zvezda 0–1

Radnički Niš – Proleter Zrenjanin 2–0

Vojvodina – Olimpija 0–2 a.e.t.

== Semi finals ==
Crvena zvezda – Radnički Niš 2–0

Olimpija – Dinamo Zagreb 3–1

== Finals ==
First leg

Home Club	Score	Visiting Club
Olimpija	2–2 (a.e.t.)	Crvena zvezda
Date	19 May 1970	
Locale	Stadion Bežigrad, Ljubljana	
Attendance	6,000	
Referee	G. Popov (Titov Veles)	
Olimpija (coach: Nedeljko Gugolj)	Zlatko Škorić, Velimir Sombolac, Atanas Djorlev, Hrvoje Jukić, Miloš Šoškić, Dragan Gugleta, Danilo Popivoda, Radoslav Bečejac, Ivan Pejović (Zlatko Klampfer), Vili Ameršek, Branko Oblak	
Crvena zvezda (coach: Miljan Miljanić)	Ratomir Dujković, Milovan Đorić, Sava Karapandžić, Miroslav Pavlović, Kiro Dojčinovski, Branko Klenkovski, Zoran Antonijević, Stanislav Karasi, Vojin Lazarević, Trifun Mihajlović, Dragan Džajić	
Scorers	0–1 Lazarević (18'), 1–1 P. Ameršek (23'), 1–2 T. Mihajlović (63'), 2–2 Bečejac (88')	

Second leg

Home Club	Score	Visiting Club
Crvena zvezda	1–0 (a.e.t.)	Olimpija
Date	27 May 1970	
Locale	Stadion Crvena Zvezda, Belgrade	
Attendance	30,000	
Referee	M. Gugulović (Niš)	
Crvena zvezda (coach: Miljan Miljanić)	Ratomir Dujković, Milovan Đorić, Sava Karapandžić, Miroslav Pavlović, Kiril Dojčinovski, Branko Klenkovski, Zoran Antonijević, Stanislav Karasi, Vojin Lazarević, Trifun Mihajlović, Dragan Džajić	
Olimpija (coach: Nedeljko Gugolj)	Zlatko Škorić, Dragan Rogić, Atanas Djorlev, Dimitrije Srbu, Miloš Šoškić, Zlatko Klampfer, Danilo Popivoda, Dragan Gugleta, Radoslav Bečejac, Vili Ameršek, Branko Oblak	
Scorers	1–0 Džajić (118')	

== See also ==
- 1969–70 Yugoslav First League
