= 1970–71 European Cup =

European football tournament

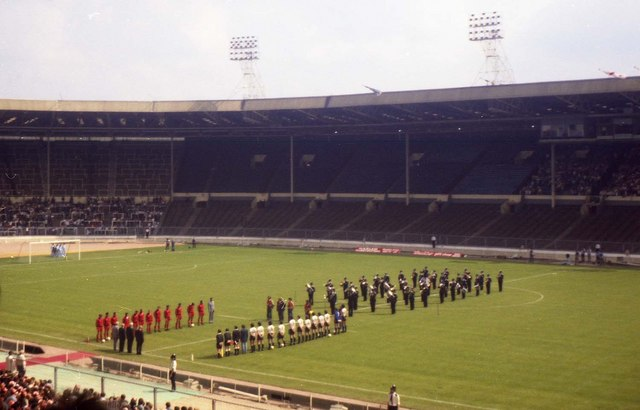
- Wembley Stadium in London hosted the final.

Tournament details
- Dates: 18 August 1970 – 2 June 1971
- Teams: 33

Final positions
- Champions: (Netherlands) Ajax (1st title)
- Runners-up: (Greece) Panathinaikos

Tournament statistics
- Matches played: 63
- Goals scored: 210 (3.33 per match)
- Attendance: 1,848,876 (29,347 per match)
- Top scorer(s): Antonis Antoniadis (Panathinaikos); 10 goals

The 1970–71 European Cup was the 16th season of the European Cup, UEFA's premier club football tournament. The competition was won by Ajax, who beat Panathinaikos in the final at Wembley Stadium in London, on 2 June 1971. It was the first time the trophy went to Ajax, beginning a three-year period of domination, and the second consecutive championship for the Netherlands. It was also the first time that a Greek team reached the final.

UEFA had introduced for the first time penalty shoot-out as a way of deciding drawn ties – doing away with the unsatisfactory tossing of a coin. They had also decided that the away goals rule should apply to all rounds, and not just the first two, as had been the case.

This season marked the first time in European Cup history that Real Madrid failed to qualify for the tournament, having appeared in all 15 previous seasons.

Feyenoord, the defending champions, were eliminated by Romanian club UTA Arad in the first round.

== Teams ==
(Albania) 17 Nëntori (1st)	Austria Wien (1st)	(Belgium) Standard Liège (1st)
(Bulgaria) Levski-Spartak (1st)	(Cyprus) EPA Larnaca (1st)	(Czechoslovakia) Slovan Bratislava (1st)
(Denmark) Boldklubben 1903 (1st)	(England) Everton (1st)	(Finland) KPV (1st)
(France) Saint-Étienne (1st)	(East Germany) Carl Zeiss Jena (1st)	(West Germany) Borussia Mönchengladbach (1st)
(Greece) Panathinaikos (1st)	(Hungary) Újpesti Dózsa (1st)	(Iceland) Keflavík (1st)
(Republic of Ireland) Waterford (1st)	(Italy) Cagliari (1st)	(Luxembourg) Jeunesse Esch (1st)
(Malta) Floriana (1st)	(Netherlands) Ajax (1st)	(Netherlands) Feyenoord (2nd)^{TH}
(Northern Ireland) Glentoran (1st)	(Norway) Rosenborg (1st)	(Poland) Legia Warsaw (1st)
(Portugal) Sporting CP (1st)	(Romania) UTA Arad (1st)	(Scotland) Celtic (1st)
(Spain) Atlético Madrid (1st)	(Sweden) IFK Göteborg (1st)	(Switzerland) Basel (1st)
(Turkey) Fenerbahçe (1st)	(Soviet Union) Spartak Moscow (1st)	(Socialist Federal Republic of Yugoslavia) Red Star Belgrade (1st)

== Preliminary round ==
Team 1	Agg.	Team 2	1st leg	2nd leg
Levski-Spartak (Bulgaria)	3–4	Austria Wien	3–1	0–3

=== First leg ===
18 August 1970

Levski-Spartak (Bulgaria)	3–1	Austria Wien
Mitkov 17'; Asparuhov 52', 62'	Report	Riedl 73'

Natsionalen Stadion Vasil Levski, Sofia
Attendance: 16,977
Referee: Antonio Sbardella (Italy)

=== Second leg ===
2 September 1970

Austria Wien	3–0	(Bulgaria) Levski-Spartak
Riedl 28'; Hickersberger 37', 49'	Report

Praterstadion, Wien
Attendance: 15,233
Referee: János Bíróczky (Hungary)

Austria Wien won 4–3 on aggregate.

== Bracket ==
First round
(Italy) Cagliari	3	0	3
(France) Saint-Étienne	0	1	1
(Spain) Atlético Madrid	2	2	4
Austria Wien	0	1	1
(Norway) Rosenborg	0	0	0
(Belgium) Standard Liège	2	5	7
(Sweden) IFK Göteborg	0	1	1
(Poland) Legia Warsaw	4	2	6
(Albania) 17 Nëntori	2	0	2
(Netherlands) Ajax	2	2	4
(Soviet Union) Spartak Moscow	3	1	4
(Switzerland) Basel (a)	2	2	4
(Northern Ireland) Glentoran	1	0	1
(Republic of Ireland) Waterford	3	1	4
(Scotland) Celtic	9	5	14
(Finland) KPV	0	0	0
(Turkey) Fenerbahçe	0	0	0
(East Germany) Carl Zeiss Jena	4	1	5
(Portugal) Sporting CP	5	4	9
(Malta) Floriana	0	0	0
(Hungary) Újpesti Dózsa	2	0	2
(Socialist Federal Republic of Yugoslavia) Red Star Belgrade	0	4	4
(Netherlands) Feyenoord	1	0	1
(Romania) UTA Arad (a)	1	0	1
(Cyprus) EPA Larnaca	0	0	0
(West Germany) Borussia M.Gladbach	6	10	16
(England) Everton	6	3	9
(Iceland) Keflavík	2	0	2
(Luxembourg) Jeunesse Esch	1	0	1
(Greece) Panathinaikos	2	5	7
(Czechoslovakia) Slovan Bratislava	2	2	4
(Denmark) Boldklubben 1903	1	2	3

Second round
(Italy) Cagliari	2	0	2
(Spain) Atlético Madrid	1	3	4
(Belgium) Standard Liège	1	0	1
(Poland) Legia Warsaw	0	2	2
(Netherlands) Ajax	3	2	5
(Switzerland) Basel	0	1	1
(Republic of Ireland) Waterford	0	2	2
(Scotland) Celtic	7	3	10
(East Germany) Carl Zeiss Jena	2	2	4
(Portugal) Sporting CP	1	1	2
(Socialist Federal Republic of Yugoslavia) Red Star Belgrade	3	3	6
(Romania) UTA Arad	0	1	1
(West Germany) Borussia M.Gladbach	1	1	2 (3)
(England) Everton (p)	1	1	2 (4)
(Greece) Panathinaikos	3	1	4
(Czechoslovakia) Slovan Bratislava	0	2	2

Quarter-finals
(Spain) Atlético Madrid (a)	1	1	2
(Poland) Legia Warsaw	0	2	2
(Netherlands) Ajax	3	0	3
(Scotland) Celtic	0	1	1
(East Germany) Carl Zeiss Jena	3	0	3
(Socialist Federal Republic of Yugoslavia) Red Star Belgrade	2	4	6
(England) Everton	1	0	1
(Greece) Panathinaikos (a)	1	0	1

Semi-finals
(Spain) Atlético Madrid	1	0	1
(Netherlands) Ajax	0	3	3
(Socialist Federal Republic of Yugoslavia) Red Star Belgrade	4	0	4
(Greece) Panathinaikos (a)	1	3	4

Final
(Netherlands) Ajax	2
(Greece) Panathinaikos	0

== First round ==
Team 1	Agg.	Team 2	1st leg	2nd leg
Cagliari (Italy)	3–1	(France) Saint-Étienne	3–0	0–1
Atlético Madrid (Spain)	4–1	Austria Wien	2–0	2–1
Rosenborg (Norway)	0–7	(Belgium) Standard Liège	0–2	0–5
IFK Göteborg (Sweden)	1–6	(Poland) Legia Warsaw	0–4	1–2
17 Nëntori (Albania)	2–4	(Netherlands) Ajax	2–2	0–2
Spartak Moscow (Soviet Union)	4–4 (a)	(Switzerland) Basel	3–2	1–2
Glentoran (Northern Ireland)	1–4	(Republic of Ireland) Waterford	1–3	0–1
Celtic (Scotland)	14–0	(Finland) KPV	9–0	5–0
Fenerbahçe (Turkey)	0–5	(East Germany) Carl Zeiss Jena	0–4	0–1
Sporting CP (Portugal)	9–0	(Malta) Floriana	5–0	4–0
Újpesti Dózsa (Hungary)	2–4	(Socialist Federal Republic of Yugoslavia) Red Star Belgrade	2–0	0–4
Feyenoord (Netherlands)	1–1 (a)	(Romania) UTA Arad	1–1	0–0
EPA Larnaca (Cyprus)	0–16	(West Germany) Borussia Mönchengladbach	0–6	0–10
Everton (England)	9–2	(Iceland) Keflavík	6–2	3–0
Jeunesse Esch (Luxembourg)	1–7	(Greece) Panathinaikos	1–2	0–5
Slovan Bratislava (Czechoslovakia)	4–3	(Denmark) Boldklubben 1903	2–1	2–2

=== First leg ===
16 September 1970

Cagliari (Italy)	3–0	(France) Saint-Étienne
Riva 7', 70'; Nené 76'	Report

Stadio Sant'Elia, Cagliari
Attendance: 54,918
Referee: Gheorghe Limona (Romania)

16 September 1970

Atlético Madrid (Spain)	2–0	Austria Wien
Aragonés 9'; Gárate 54'	Report

Estadio Manzanares, Madrid
Attendance: 24,915
Referee: Vital Loraux (Belgium)

16 September 1970

Rosenborg (Norway)	0–2	(Belgium) Standard Liège
	Report	Kostedde 42'; Depireux 63'

Lerkendal Stadion, Trondheim
Attendance: 11,299
Referee: Reino Koskinen (Finland)

16 September 1970

IFK Göteborg (Sweden)	0–4	(Poland) Legia Warsaw
	Report	Gadocha 45'; Pieszko 52'; Stachurski 82', 87'

Ullevi Stadion, Gothemburg
Attendance: 2,718
Referee: William O'Neill (Northern Ireland)

16 September 1970

17 Nëntori (Albania)	2–2	(Netherlands) Ajax
Kazanxhi 60'; Ceco 85'	Report	Suurbier 19', 58'

Qemal Stafa Stadium, Tirana
Attendance: 17,516
Referee: Paul Schiller (Austria)

16 September 1970

Spartak Moscow (Soviet Union)	3–2	(Switzerland) Basel
Osyanin 17', 66'; Papayev 76'	Report	Odermatt 78'; Benthaus 83'

Central Stadium Vladimir Lenin, Moscow
Attendance: 85,000
Referee: Jim Finney (England)

16 September 1970

Glentoran (Northern Ireland)	1–3	(Republic of Ireland) Waterford
Hall 9'	Report	O'Neill 20'; McGeough 60'; Casey 75'

The Oval, Belfast
Attendance: 8,000
Referee: Johan Einar Boström (Sweden)

16 September 1970

Celtic (Scotland)	9–0	(Finland) KPV
Hood 1', 23', 36' (pen.); Hughes 15'; McNeill 22'; Johnstone 38'; Wilson 54', 70'; Davidson 60'	Report

Celtic Park, Glasgow
Attendance: 39,744
Referee: Einar Hjaltarson (Iceland)

16 September 1970

Fenerbahçe (Turkey)	0–4	(East Germany) Carl Zeiss Jena
	Report	Krauß 44'; Ducke 70', 85'; Vogel 86'

Fenerbahçe Stadyumu, Istanbul
Attendance: 31,833
Referee: Karol Šárka (Czechoslovakia)

16 September 1970

Sporting CP (Portugal)	5–0	(Malta) Floriana
Peres 1'; Lourenço 6', 8', 43', 61'	Report

Estádio José Alvalade, Lisbon
Attendance: 18,628
Referee: Joseph Hannet (Belgium)

16 September 1970

Újpesti Dózsa (Hungary)	2–0	(Socialist Federal Republic of Yugoslavia) Red Star Belgrade
Nagy 52'; A. Dunai 81'	Report

Megyeri úti Stadion, Budapest
Attendance: 9,358
Referee: Todor Bechirov (Bulgaria)

16 September 1970

Feyenoord (Netherlands)	1–1	(Romania) UTA Arad
Jansen 25'	Report	Dumitrescu 14'

De Kuip, Rotterdam
Attendance: 57,796
Referee: Gaspar Pintado Viu (Spain)

16 September 1970

EPA Larnaca (Cyprus)	0–6	(West Germany) Borussia Mönchengladbach
	Report	Laumen 6', 35'; Köppel 28', 48'; Netzer 57'; Heynckes 84'

Rosenaustadion, Augsburg
Attendance: 15,764
Referee: Josef Krňávek (Czechoslovakia)

16 September 1970

Everton (England)	6–2	(Iceland) Keflavík
Ball 39', 58', 67'; Kendall 41'; Royle 51', 70'	Report	West 11' (o.g.); Ragnarsson 78'

Goodison Park, Liverpool
Attendance: 28,424
Referee: Michalakis Kyriakides (Cyprus)

16 September 1970

Jeunesse Esch (Luxembourg)	1–2	(Greece) Panathinaikos
Di Genova 11'	Report	Antoniadis 5'; Eleftherakis 36'

Stade de la Frontière, Esch-sur-Alzette
Attendance: 2,052
Referee: Roger Machin (France)

16 September 1970

Slovan Bratislava (Czechoslovakia)	2–1	(Denmark) Boldklubben 1903
Ján Čapkovič 36'; Zlocha 90' (pen.)	Report	Johansen 35'

Tehelné Pole, Bratislava
Attendance: 8,213
Referee: Marian Srodecki (Poland)

=== Second leg ===
30 September 1970

Saint-Étienne (France)	1–0	(Italy) Cagliari
Larqué 32'	Report

Stade Geoffroy Guichard, Saint-Étienne
Attendance: 26,642
Referee: Gerhard Schulenburg (West Germany)

Cagliari won 3–1 on aggregate.

30 September 1970

Austria Wien	1–2	(Spain) Atlético Madrid
Krieger 20' (pen.)	Report	Aragonés 42'; Gárate 84'

Praterstadion, Wien
Attendance: 23,500
Referee: Michel Kitabdjian (France)

Atlético Madrid won 4–1 on aggregate.

30 September 1970

Standard Liège (Belgium)	5–0	(Norway) Rosenborg
Pilot 2', 75'; Cvetler 4'; Depireux 26'; Semmeling 62'	Report

Sclessin, Liège
Attendance: 10,472
Referee: Gunnar Michaelsen (Denmark)

Standard Liège won 7–0 on aggregate.

1 October 1970

Legia Warsaw (Poland)	2–1	(Sweden) IFK Göteborg
Deyna 37'; Gadocha 38'	Report	Almqvist 28'

Stadion Wojska Polskiego, Warsaw
Attendance: 7,725
Referee: Léonidas Vamvakopoulos (Greece)

Legia Warsaw won 6–1 on aggregate.

30 September 1970

Ajax (Netherlands)	2–0	(Albania) 17 Nëntori
Keizer 8'; Swart 70'	Report

Olympisch Stadion, Amsterdam
Attendance: 28,978
Referee: Christos Michas (Greece)

Ajax won 4–2 on aggregate.

30 September 1970

Basel (Switzerland)	2–1	(Soviet Union) Spartak Moscow
Siegenthaler 48'; Balmer 55'	Report	Khusainov 84'

St. Jakob Stadium, Basel
Attendance: 50,000
Referee: Ferdinand Marschall (Austria)

4–4 on aggregate; Basel won on away goals.

30 September 1970

Waterford (Republic of Ireland)	1–0	(Northern Ireland) Glentoran
Casey 57'	Report

Kilcohan Park, Waterford
Attendance: 6,000
Referee: Einar Røed (Norway)

Waterford won 4–1 on aggregate.

30 September 1970

KPV (Finland)	0–5	(Scotland) Celtic
	Report	Wallace 26', 46'; Callaghan 35'; Davidson 51'; Lennox 72'

Kokkolan Keskuskenttä, Kokkola
Attendance: 3,900
Referee: Karlo Kruashvili (Soviet Union)

Celtic won 14–0 on aggregate.

30 September 1970

Carl Zeiss Jena (East Germany)	1–0	(Turkey) Fenerbahçe
Vogel 43'	Report

Ernst-Abbe-Sportfeld, Jena
Attendance: 9,746
Referee: Francesco Francescon (Italy)

Carl Zeiss Jena won 5–0 on aggregate.

30 September 1970

Floriana (Malta)	0–4	(Portugal) Sporting CP
	Report	Fernandes 30', 65'; Dinis 57'; Tomé 73'

Empire Stadium, Gżira
Attendance: 5,012
Referee: Jack Taylor (England)

Sporting CP won 9–0 on aggregate.

30 September 1970

Red Star Belgrade (Socialist Federal Republic of Yugoslavia)	4–0	(Hungary) Újpesti Dózsa
Filipović 7', 58'; Džajić 24'; Ostojić 44'	Report

Stadion Crvena Zvezda, Belgrade
Attendance: 28,632
Referee: Pavel Kazakov (Soviet Union)

Red Star Belgrade won 4–2 on aggregate.

30 September 1970

UTA Arad (Romania)	0–0	(Netherlands) Feyenoord
	Report

Stadionul Francisc von Neuman, Arad
Attendance: 17,000
Referee: Ferdinand Biwersi (West Germany)

1–1 on aggregate; UTA Arad won on away goals.

22 September 1970

Borussia Mönchengladbach (West Germany)	10–0	(Cyprus) EPA Larnaca
Netzer 19'; Wimmer 30'; Köppel 35', 60'; Dietrich 40'; Sieloff 44' (pen.); Laumen 50', 56'; Heynckes 73'; Vogts 82'	Report

Bökelbergstadion, Mönchengladbach
Attendance: 16,059
Referee: Bohumil Smejkal (Czechoslovakia)

Borussia Mönchengladbach won 16–0 on aggregate.

30 September 1970

Keflavík (Iceland)	0–3	(England) Everton
	Report	Whittle 32'; Royle 38', 46'

Laugardalsvöllur, Reykjavík
Attendance: 9,546
Referee: Malcolm Wright (Northern Ireland)

Everton won 9–2 on aggregate.

30 September 1970

Panathinaikos (Greece)	5–0	(Luxembourg) Jeunesse Esch
Eleftherakis 16'; Antoniadis 26', 29', 37', 51'	Report

Leoforos Alexandras Stadium, Athens
Attendance: 18,656
Referee: Arthur Lentini (Malta)

Panathinaikos won 7–1 on aggregate.

30 September 1970

Boldklubben 1903 (Denmark)	2–2	(Czechoslovakia) Slovan Bratislava
Thygesen 78' (pen.); Johansen 90'	Report	Jozef Čapkovič 9', 57'

Idrætsparken, København
Attendance: 13,032
Referee: Laurens van Ravens (Netherlands)

Slovan Bratislava won 4–3 on aggregate.

== Second round ==
Team 1	Agg.	Team 2	1st leg	2nd leg
Cagliari (Italy)	2–4	(Spain) Atlético Madrid	2–1	0–3
Standard Liège (Belgium)	1–2	(Poland) Legia Warsaw	1–0	0–2
Ajax (Netherlands)	5–1	(Switzerland) Basel	3–0	2–1
Waterford (Republic of Ireland)	2–10	(Scotland) Celtic	0–7	2–3
Carl Zeiss Jena (East Germany)	4–2	(Portugal) Sporting CP	2–1	2–1
Red Star Belgrade (Socialist Federal Republic of Yugoslavia)	6–1	(Romania) UTA Arad	3–0	3–1
Borussia Mönchengladbach (West Germany)	2–2 (3–4 p)	(England) Everton	1–1	1–1
Panathinaikos (Greece)	4–2	(Czechoslovakia) Slovan Bratislava	3–0	1–2

=== First leg ===
21 October 1970

Cagliari (Italy)	2–1	(Spain) Atlético Madrid
Riva 42'; Gori 45+'	Report	Aragonés 77'

Stadio Sant'Elia, Cagliari
Attendance: 44,403
Referee: Josef Krňávek (Czechoslovakia)

21 October 1970

Standard Liège (Belgium)	1–0	(Poland) Legia Warsaw
Pilot 76'	Report

Sclessin, Liège
Attendance: 30,000
Referee: Milivoje Gugulović (Yugoslavia)

21 October 1970

Ajax (Netherlands)	3–0	(Switzerland) Basel
Keizer 17'; Van Dijk 23'; Hulshoff 63'	Report

Olympisch Stadion, Amsterdam
Attendance: 34,083
Referee: Petar Nikolov (Bulgaria)

21 October 1970

Waterford (Republic of Ireland)	0–7	(Scotland) Celtic
	Report	Wallace 1', 54', 56'; Macari 19', 87'; Murdoch 27', 38'

Lansdowne Road, Dublin
Attendance: 41,486
Referee: Kaj Bernhard Rasmussen (Denmark)

21 October 1970

Carl Zeiss Jena (East Germany)	2–1	(Portugal) Sporting CP
Vogel 51'; Kurbjuweit 87'	Report	Marinho 67'

Ernst-Abbe-Sportfeld, Jena
Attendance: 11,704
Referee: Henry Øberg (Norway)

21 October 1970

Red Star Belgrade (Socialist Federal Republic of Yugoslavia)	3–0	(Romania) UTA Arad
Filipović 18'; Aćimović 50'; Ostojić 53'	Report

Stadion Crvena Zvezda, Belgrade
Attendance: 25,000
Referee: Stanisław Eksztajn (Poland)

21 October 1970

Borussia Mönchengladbach (West Germany)	1–1	(England) Everton
Vogts 35'	Report	Kendall 47'

Bökelbergstadion, Mönchengladbach
Attendance: 29,340
Referee: Karlo Kruashvili (Soviet Union)

21 October 1970

Panathinaikos (Greece)	3–0	(Czechoslovakia) Slovan Bratislava
Domazos 3'; Antoniadis 55'; Delijannis 88'	Report

Leoforos Alexandras Stadium, Athens
Attendance: 22,189
Referee: Constantin Barbulescu (Romania)

=== Second leg ===
5 November 1970

Atlético Madrid (Spain)	3–0	(Italy) Cagliari
Aragonés 33', 72' (pen.), 89'	Report

Estadio Manzanares, Madrid
Attendance: 39,026
Referee: Ronald Jones (Wales)

Atlético Madrid won 4–2 on aggregate.

4 November 1970

Legia Warsaw (Poland)	2–0	(Belgium) Standard Liège
Pieszko 7'; Żmijewski 20'	Report

Stadion Wojska Polskiego, Warsaw
Attendance: 17,237
Referee: José María Ortiz de Mendíbil (Spain)

Legia Warsaw won 2–1 on aggregate.

4 November 1970

Basel (Switzerland)	1–2	(Netherlands) Ajax
Odermatt 36' (pen.)	Report	Rijnders 69'; Neeskens 72'

St. Jakob Stadium, Basel
Attendance: 30,745
Referee: Dermot Barrett (Republic of Ireland)

Ajax won 5–1 on aggregate.

4 November 1970

Celtic (Scotland)	3–2	(Republic of Ireland) Waterford
Hughes 47'; Johnstone 56', 65'	Report	McNeill 17' (o.g.); Matthews 32'

Celtic Park, Glasgow
Attendance: 16,160
Referee: Ferdinand Biwersi (West Germany)

Celtic won 10–2 on aggregate.

4 November 1970

Sporting CP (Portugal)	1–2	(East Germany) Carl Zeiss Jena
Gonçalves 79'	Report	Ducke 30'; Kurbjuweit 36'

Estádio José Alvalade, Lisbon
Attendance: 38,726
Referee: Bobby Davidson (Scotland)

Carl Zeiss Jena won 4–2 on aggregate.

4 November 1970

UTA Arad (Romania)	1–3	(Socialist Federal Republic of Yugoslavia) Red Star Belgrade
Brosovszky 56'	Report	Filipović 51', 67'; Janković 78'

Stadionul Francisc von Neuman, Arad
Attendance: 20,000
Referee: Kevin Howley (England)

Red Star Belgrade won 6–1 on aggregate.

4 November 1970

Everton (England)	1 – 1 (a.e.t.)	(West Germany) Borussia Mönchengladbach
Morrissey 1'	Report	Laumen 35'
Penalties
Royle (penalty missed); Ball (penalty scored); Morrissey (penalty scored); Kendall (penalty scored); Brown (penalty scored)	4–3	(penalty scored) Sieloff; (penalty missed) Laumen; (penalty scored) Heynckes; (penalty scored) Köppel; (penalty missed) Müller

Goodison Park, Liverpool
Attendance: 42,744
Referee: Antonio Sbardella (Italy)

2–2 on aggregate; Everton won on penalties.

4 November 1970

Slovan Bratislava (Czechoslovakia)	2–1	(Greece) Panathinaikos
Medviď 31'; Ján Čapkovič 58'	Report	Antoniadis 52'

Tehelné Pole, Bratislava
Attendance: 16,874
Referee: Bertil Lööw (Sweden)

Panathinaikos won 4–2 on aggregate.

== Quarter-finals ==
Team 1	Agg.	Team 2	1st leg	2nd leg
Atlético Madrid (Spain)	2–2 (a)	(Poland) Legia Warsaw	1–0	1–2
Ajax (Netherlands)	3–1	(Scotland) Celtic	3–0	0–1
Carl Zeiss Jena (East Germany)	3–6	(Socialist Federal Republic of Yugoslavia) Red Star Belgrade	3–2	0–4
Everton (England)	1–1 (a)	(Greece) Panathinaikos	1–1	0–0

=== First leg ===
10 March 1971

Atlético Madrid (Spain)	1–0	(Poland) Legia Warsaw
Adelardo 22'	Report

Estadio Manzanares, Madrid
Attendance: 30,000
Referee: Ferdinand Marschall (Austria)

10 March 1971

Ajax (Netherlands)	3–0	(Scotland) Celtic
Cruyff 63'; Hulshoff 70'; Keizer 89'	Report

Olympisch Stadion, Amsterdam
Attendance: 54,862
Referee: Antonio Saldanha (Portugal)

10 March 1971

Carl Zeiss Jena (East Germany)	3–2	(Socialist Federal Republic of Yugoslavia) Red Star Belgrade
Strempel 16'; Ducke 21'; Irmscher 84'	Report	Janković 42'; Džajić 58'

Ernst-Abbe-Sportfeld, Jena
Attendance: 13,028
Referee: John Carpenter (Republic of Ireland)

9 March 1971

Everton (England)	1–1	(Greece) Panathinaikos
Johnson 90'	Report	Antoniadis 81'

Goodison Park, Liverpool
Attendance: 46,047
Referee: Rudi Glöckner (East Germany)

=== Second leg ===
24 March 1971

Legia Warsaw (Poland)	2–1	(Spain) Atlético Madrid
Pieszko 25'; Stachurski 54'	Report	Salcedo 11'

Stadion Wojska Polskiego, Warsaw
Attendance: 20,671
Referee: Jack Taylor (England)

2–2 on aggregate; Atlético Madrid won on away goals.

24 March 1971

Celtic (Scotland)	1–0	(Netherlands) Ajax
Johnstone 27'	Report

Hampden Park, Glasgow
Attendance: 83,684
Referee: Concetto Lo Bello (Italy)

Ajax won 3–1 on aggregate.

24 March 1971

Red Star Belgrade (Socialist Federal Republic of Yugoslavia)	4–0	(East Germany) Carl Zeiss Jena
Đorić 15' (pen.); Filipović 30'; Ostojić 60'; Karasi 70'	Report

Stadion Crvena Zvezda, Belgrade
Attendance: 90,000
Referee: Cornel Niţescu (Romania)

Red Star Belgrade won 6–3 on aggregate.

24 March 1971

Panathinaikos (Greece)	0–0	(England) Everton
	Report

Leoforos Alexandras Stadium, Athens
Attendance: 25,005
Referee: Robert Héliès (France)

1–1 on aggregate; Panathinaikos won on away goals.

== Semi-finals ==
Team 1	Agg.	Team 2	1st leg	2nd leg
Atlético Madrid (Spain)	1–3	(Netherlands) Ajax	1–0	0–3
Red Star Belgrade (Socialist Federal Republic of Yugoslavia)	4–4 (a)	(Greece) Panathinaikos	4–1	0–3

=== First leg ===
14 April 1971

Atlético Madrid (Spain)	1–0	(Netherlands) Ajax
Irureta 44'	Report

Estadio Manzanares, Madrid
Attendance: 40,000
Referee: Gerhard Schulenburg (West Germany)

14 April 1971

Red Star Belgrade (Socialist Federal Republic of Yugoslavia)	4–1	(Greece) Panathinaikos
Ostojić 14', 46', 69'; Janković 40'	Report	Kamaras 56'

Stadion Crvena Zvezda, Belgrade
Attendance: 89,400
Referee: Erich Linemayr(Austria)

=== Second leg ===
28 April 1971

Ajax (Netherlands)	3–0	(Spain) Atlético Madrid
Keizer 8'; Suurbier 80'; Neeskens 85'	Report

Olympisch Stadion, Amsterdam
Attendance: 65,000
Referee: Antonio Sbardella (Italy)

Ajax won 3–1 on aggregate.

28 April 1971

Panathinaikos (Greece)	3–0	(Socialist Federal Republic of Yugoslavia) Red Star Belgrade
Antoniadis 2', 55'; Kamaras 64'	Report

Leoforos Alexandras Stadium, Athens
Attendance: 25,005
Referee: José María Ortiz de Mendíbil (Spain)

4–4 on aggregate; Panathinaikos won on away goals.

== Final ==
2 June 1971

Ajax (Netherlands)	2–0	(Greece) Panathinaikos
Van Dijk 5'; Haan 87'	Report

Wembley Stadium, London
Attendance: 83,179
Referee: Jack Taylor (England)

== Top scorers ==
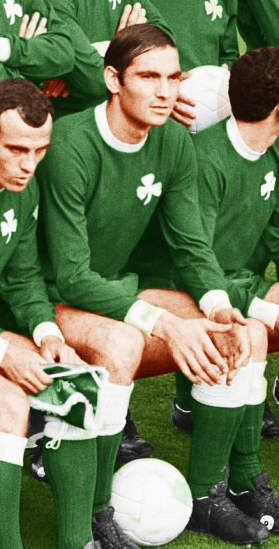
Antonis Antoniadis of Panathinaikos scored 10 goals

The top scorers from the 1970–71 European Cup (excluding preliminary round) are as follows:

Rank	Name	Team	Goals
1	(Greece) Antonis Antoniadis	(Greece) Panathinaikos	10
2	(Spain) Luis Aragonés	(Spain) Atlético Madrid	6
2	(Socialist Federal Republic of Yugoslavia) Zoran Filipović	(Socialist Federal Republic of Yugoslavia) Red Star Belgrade	6
2	(Socialist Federal Republic of Yugoslavia) Stevan Ostojić	(Socialist Federal Republic of Yugoslavia) Red Star Belgrade	6
5	(West Germany) Herbert Laumen	(West Germany) Borussia Mönchengladbach	5
5	(Scotland) Willie Wallace	(Scotland) Celtic	5
7	(East Germany) Peter Ducke	(East Germany) Carl Zeiss Jena	4
7	(Scotland) Jimmy Johnstone	(Scotland) Celtic	4
7	(Netherlands) Piet Keizer	(Netherlands) Ajax	4
7	(West Germany) Horst Köppel	(West Germany) Borussia Mönchengladbach	4
7	(Portugal) João Lourenço	(Portugal) Sporting CP	4
7	(England) Joe Royle	(England) Everton	4
