= Krivokuća =

Krivokuća (Serbian: Кривокућа) is a Serbian-language surname. It may refer to:

- Petar Krivokuća (born 1947), Serbian retired football defender who played for Yugoslavia.
- Srboljub Krivokuća (1928–2002), Yugoslav and Serbian football manager and player.
- Blagomir Krivokuća (1944–2023), Yugoslav Serbian football manager and player.
- Stojko Krivokuća (d. 1804), Serbian revolutionary
