= Ivan Pejović =

Montenegrin footballer (born 1945)

Ivan Pejović Иван Пејовић
Personal information
- Full name: Ivan Pejović
- Date of birth: 2 October 1945
- Place of birth: Cetinje, Montenegro, Yugoslavia
- Height: 1.81 m (5 ft 11 in)
- Position: Centre-forward

Senior career*
| Years | Team | Apps | (Gls) |
| 1963–1968 | Lovćen | | |
| 1968–1969 | Red Star Belgrade | | |
| 1969–1972 | Olimpija Ljubljana | | |
| 1972–1974 | Chaumont | | |
| 1974–1975 | Borac Banja Luka | | |

International career
| 1966 | Montenegro | 1 | (0) |
- * Club domestic league appearances and goals

Ivan Pejović (Montenegrin Cyrillic: Иван Пејовић; born 2 October 1945) is a retired Montenegrin footballer. He played for Lovćen and Olimpija Ljubljana throughout the 1960s and the 1970s as a centre-forward.

== Club career ==
Pejović began his career with Lovćen for the 1963–64 Yugoslav Third League and helped the club achieve promotion for the 1965–66 Yugoslav Second League. He was then signed for Red Star Belgrade for their 1968–69 Red Star Belgrade though he wouldn't make any official appearances. Despite his relative inactivity throughout the season, he caught the interest of Slovenian club Olimpija Ljubljana to play in the 1969–70 Yugoslav First League, nearly facing relegation in his debut season. Despite that though, the club would perform well enough to qualify for the 1970–71 European Cup Winners' Cup. Despite scoring the equalizing goal against Eusébio's Benfica during the 1st leg of the group stage on 16 September 1970, the club later received a 8–1 beating on 30 September 1970 during the second leg, eliminating them from the tournament. Throughout this era of Olimpija, he formed the club's offensive formation alongside Danilo Popivoda, Radoslav Bečejac, Vili Ameršek and Branko Oblak. He would play for the following few seasons in the Yugoslav First League, before he played abroad in the 1972–73 French Division 2. He returned to Yugoslavia to end his career with during the 1974–75 Yugoslav Second League where he helped the club achieve promotion before retiring around the end of the season.

== International career ==
Pejović was called up to play for Montenegro on 27 March 1966 in a friendly against the Soviet Union in preparation for the 1966 FIFA World Cup which ended in a 0–1 loss.
