= 1972–73 Yugoslav First League =

Prva savezna liga
- Season: 1972–73
- Dates: 20 August 1972 – 24 June 1973
- Champions: Red Star (11th title)
- Relegated: Spartak; Sutjeska
- Top goalscorer: Vojin Lazarević; Slobodan Santrač (25 goals each)

The 1972–73 Yugoslav First League season was the 27th season of the First Federal League of Yugoslavia (Serbo-Croatian Latin: Prva savezna liga Jugoslavije), the top level association football competition of SFR Yugoslavia, since its establishment in 1946. A total of 18 teams competed in the league, with the previous season's runners-up Red Star winning the title.

== Teams ==
A total of eighteen teams contested the league, including sixteen sides from the 1971–72 season and two sides promoted from the 1971–72 Yugoslav Second League (YSL) as winners of the two second level divisions East and West. The league was contested in a double round robin format, with each club playing every other club twice, for a total of 34 rounds. Two points were awarded for wins and one point for draws.

Radnički Kragujevac and NK Maribor were relegated from the 1971–72 Yugoslav First League after finishing the season in bottom two places of the league table. The two clubs promoted to top level were Bor and Spartak Subotica.

| Team | Location | Federal Republic | Position in 1971–72 |
|---|---|---|---|
| Bor | Bor | SR Serbia | — |
| Borac Banja Luka | Banja Luka | SR Bosnia and Herzegovina | 13th |
| Čelik | Zenica | SR Bosnia and Herzegovina | 12th |
| Dinamo Zagreb | Zagreb | SR Croatia | 8th |
| Hajduk Split | Split | SR Croatia | 10th |
| OFK Belgrade | Belgrade | SR Serbia | 3rd |
| Olimpija Ljubljana | Ljubljana | SR Slovenia | 9th |
| Partizan | Belgrade | SR Serbia | 5th |
| Radnički Niš | Niš | SR Serbia | 14th |
| Red Star | Belgrade | SR Serbia | 2nd |
| Sarajevo | Sarajevo | SR Bosnia and Herzegovina | 15th |
| Sloboda | Tuzla | SR Bosnia and Herzegovina | 7th |
| Spartak Subotica | Subotica | SR Serbia | — |
| Sutjeska Nikšić | Nikšić | SR Montenegro | 16th |
| Vardar | Skopje | SR Macedonia | 11th |
| Velež | Mostar | SR Bosnia and Herzegovina | 6th |
| Vojvodina | Novi Sad | SR Serbia | 4th |
| Željezničar | Sarajevo | SR Bosnia and Herzegovina | 1st |

== League table ==
| Pos | Team | Pld | W | D | L | GF | GA | GD | Pts | Qualification or relegation |
|---|---|---|---|---|---|---|---|---|---|---|
| 1 | Red Star Belgrade (C) | 34 | 21 | 10 | 3 | 71 | 28 | +43 | 52 | Qualification for European Cup first round |
| 2 | Velež | 34 | 17 | 12 | 5 | 48 | 27 | +21 | 46 | Qualification for UEFA Cup first round |
| 3 | OFK Belgrade | 34 | 16 | 13 | 5 | 52 | 31 | +21 | 45 | Qualification for UEFA Cup first round |
| 4 | Partizan | 34 | 16 | 11 | 7 | 50 | 37 | +13 | 43 | |
| 5 | Željezničar | 34 | 18 | 6 | 10 | 59 | 41 | +18 | 42 | |
| 6 | Sloboda Tuzla | 34 | 8 | 18 | 8 | 34 | 32 | +2 | 34 | |
| 7 | Sarajevo | 34 | 12 | 10 | 12 | 48 | 50 | −2 | 34 | |
| 8 | Dinamo Zagreb | 34 | 11 | 11 | 12 | 39 | 47 | −8 | 33 | Qualification for Cup Winners' Cup first round |
| 9 | Hajduk Split | 34 | 14 | 3 | 17 | 50 | 50 | 0 | 31 | |
| 10 | Vardar (Note: Vardar was invited to the Balkans Cup.) | 34 | 10 | 11 | 13 | 35 | 50 | −15 | 31 | |
| 11 | Radnički Niš | 34 | 10 | 10 | 14 | 24 | 40 | −16 | 30 | |
| 12 | Borac Banja Luka | 34 | 9 | 11 | 14 | 30 | 26 | +4 | 29 | |
| 13 | Vojvodina | 34 | 10 | 9 | 15 | 39 | 46 | −7 | 29 | |
| 14 | Čelik | 34 | 9 | 10 | 15 | 27 | 44 | −17 | 28 | |
| 15 | Bor | 34 | 9 | 10 | 15 | 36 | 57 | −21 | 28 | |
| 16 | Olimpija | 34 | 9 | 8 | 17 | 35 | 43 | −8 | 26 | |
| 17 | Spartak Subotica (R) | 34 | 8 | 10 | 16 | 37 | 48 | −11 | 26 | Relegation to Yugoslav Second League |
| 18 | Sutjeska Nikšić (R) | 34 | 9 | 7 | 18 | 32 | 49 | −17 | 25 | Relegation to Yugoslav Second League |

Source: rsssf.org
Rules for classification: 1) points; 2) goal difference; 3) number of goals scored.
(C) Champions; (R) Relegated

== Results ==
| Home \ Away | BOR | BBL | ČEL | DIN | HAJ | OFK | OLI | PAR | RNI | RSB | SAR | SLO | SPA | SUT | VAR | VEL | VOJ | ŽEL |
|---|---|---|---|---|---|---|---|---|---|---|---|---|---|---|---|---|---|---|
| Bor | | 0–0 | 0–0 | 1–0 | 3–0 | 2–2 | 1–0 | 1–1 | 1–0 | 0–5 | 4–1 | 0–0 | 4–1 | 1–0 | 1–1 | 0–3 | 2–1 | 1–2 |
| Borac Banja Luka | 3–1 | | 0–0 | 3–0 | 2–0 | 1–1 | 1–1 | 0–0 | 3–0 | 0–1 | 2–2 | 1–0 | 0–1 | 0–0 | 6–0 | 0–1 | 2–0 | 1–2 |
| Čelik | 0–0 | 0–0 | | 4–1 | 2–1 | 0–0 | 1–0 | 2–2 | 3–1 | 0–2 | 3–0 | 1–0 | 2–0 | 2–0 | 1–0 | 1–1 | 0–2 | 1–2 |
| Dinamo Zagreb | 4–1 | 1–0 | 0–0 | | 1–0 | 0–4 | 7–3 | 0–1 | 2–0 | 1–0 | 0–1 | 1–1 | 2–1 | 4–3 | 1–0 | 1–1 | 2–1 | 2–1 |
| Hajduk Split | 4–0 | 1–1 | 3–0 | 1–1 | | 1–0 | 2–1 | 3–2 | 2–0 | 2–0 | 2–1 | 4–0 | 2–2 | 3–0 | 5–0 | 0–3 | 7–0 | 3–2 |
| OFK Belgrade | 3–1 | 1–0 | 1–0 | 4–2 | 2–0 | | 4–0 | 1–0 | 1–0 | 1–1 | 0–0 | 2–1 | 1–1 | 2–1 | 2–2 | 2–0 | 2–0 | 4–3 |
| Olimpija | 1–1 | 3–0 | 2–0 | 0–0 | 4–0 | 0–0 | | 2–0 | 0–1 | 1–2 | 2–0 | 2–2 | 0–2 | 1–0 | 3–1 | 1–1 | 3–1 | 0–1 |
| Partizan | 2–2 | 2–1 | 4–1 | 2–1 | 2–1 | 1–0 | 2–0 | | 2–1 | 1–1 | 3–1 | 1–0 | 3–1 | 3–1 | 2–1 | 2–2 | 1–0 | 1–0 |
| Radnički Niš | 1–0 | 1–0 | 3–0 | 1–1 | 1–0 | 2–0 | 1–0 | 1–1 | | 1–1 | 0–0 | 0–0 | 0–2 | 2–0 | 1–0 | 0–0 | 1–1 | 0–0 |
| Red Star | 5–1 | 2–0 | 5–1 | 1–0 | 4–0 | 3–3 | 1–0 | 2–0 | 3–1 | | 4–1 | 3–1 | 3–1 | 3–2 | 3–2 | 1–1 | 3–1 | 3–0 |
| Sarajevo | 3–1 | 0–0 | 4–0 | 2–0 | 2–0 | 1–1 | 3–2 | 3–0 | 1–2 | 2–2 | | 0–0 | 4–1 | 2–1 | 3–1 | 2–2 | 3–2 | 2–4 |
| Sloboda Tuzla | 3–0 | 1–2 | 0–0 | 1–1 | 2–0 | 1–1 | 1–0 | 2–1 | 1–0 | 1–1 | 3–0 | | 1–0 | 2–0 | 0–0 | 0–0 | 0–0 | 3–3 |
| Spartak Subotica | 1–1 | 0–1 | 0–0 | 2–2 | 1–0 | 1–2 | 0–0 | 1–1 | 1–1 | 0–1 | 4–0 | 1–1 | | 2–1 | 2–2 | 2–1 | 0–1 | 0–1 |
| Sutjeska | 5–3 | 1–0 | 1–0 | 0–0 | 2–0 | 0–0 | 1–0 | 2–1 | 0–0 | 0–3 | 1–0 | 2–2 | 3–1 | | 0–2 | 0–0 | 1–2 | 3–2 |
| Vardar | 1–0 | 1–0 | 2–0 | 4–1 | 1–2 | 2–2 | 0–0 | 1–1 | 1–0 | 0–0 | 0–0 | 2–1 | 0–3 | 0–0 | | 1–0 | 2–1 | 4–1 |
| Velež | 3–0 | 1–0 | 2–1 | 0–0 | 1–0 | 2–0 | 2–1 | 0–3 | 4–0 | 1–1 | 2–1 | 1–1 | 2–1 | 1–0 | 4–0 | | 2–1 | 2–1 |
| Vojvodina | 0–2 | 0–0 | 2–1 | 0–0 | 3–0 | 1–0 | 4–1 | 2–2 | 2–0 | 1–1 | 0–2 | 1–1 | 3–0 | 3–0 | 1–1 | 1–2 | | 1–1 |
| Željezničar | 1–0 | 1–0 | 3–0 | 3–0 | 4–1 | 1–3 | 0–1 | 0–0 | 7–1 | 1–0 | 1–1 | 1–1 | 2–1 | 2–1 | 3–0 | 2–0 | 1–0 | |

Source: DataSoccer.it
Legend: Blue = home team win; Yellow = draw; Red = away team win.

== Winning squad ==
Champions
Red Star Belgrade

Zoran Antonijević
Jovan Aćimović
Zoran Bingulac
Vladislav Bogićević
Kiro Dojčinovski
Ratomir Dujković
Milovan Đorić
Slobodan Janković
Živorad Jeftić
Nikola Jovanović
Stanislav Karasi
Mihalj Keri
Branko Klenkovski
Petar Krivokuća
Vojin Lazarević
Dušan Nikolić
Mile Novković
Miroslav Pavlović
Aleksandar Panajotović
Vladimir Petrović
Ognjan Petrović
Sead Sušić
Zoran Filipović
Dragan Džajić

== Top scorers ==
| Rank | Player | Club | Goals |
|---|---|---|---|
| 1 | (Socialist Federal Republic of Yugoslavia) Vojin Lazarević | Red Star | 25 |
| 1 | (Socialist Federal Republic of Yugoslavia) Slobodan Santrač | OFK Belgrade | 25 |
| 3 | (Socialist Federal Republic of Yugoslavia) Dušan Bajević | Velež | 21 |
| 4 | (Socialist Federal Republic of Yugoslavia) Petar Nadoveza | Hajduk Split | 19 |
| 5 | (Socialist Federal Republic of Yugoslavia) Stanislav Karasi | Red Star | 17 |
| 6 | (Socialist Federal Republic of Yugoslavia) Josip Bukal | Željezničar | 15 |
| 7 | (Socialist Federal Republic of Yugoslavia) Salem Halilhodžić | Velež | 14 |
| 8 | (Socialist Federal Republic of Yugoslavia) Nenad Bjeković | Partizan | 13 |
| 9 | (Socialist Federal Republic of Yugoslavia) Zvonko Ivezić | Vojvodina | 12 |
| 10 | (Socialist Federal Republic of Yugoslavia) Momčilo Vukotić | Partizan | 11 |

== See also ==
- 1972–73 Yugoslav Second League
