= Zoran Bingulac =

Serbian politician and footballer (born 1953)

Zoran Bingulac Зоран Бингулац

Ambassador of the Federal Republic of Yugoslavia to South Africa
- In office 1998–2001

Ambassador of Serbia to Montenegro
- In office 2013–2019
- Preceded by: Zoran Lutovac

Personal details
- Born: Zoran Bingulac; 5 May 1953 (age 73) Šabac, Serbia, Yugoslavia
- Education: University of Belgrade
- Occupation: Footballer; Politician; University professor
Association football career
- Positions: Center forward; right-back
Senior career*
Years	Team	Apps	(Gls)
1972–81	Red Star Belgrade		
1981–82	Velež Mostar		
International career
- Yugoslavia
- * Club domestic league appearances and goals

Zoran Bingulac (Serbian Cyrillic: Зоран Бингулац; born 5 May 1953) is a Serbian politician, diplomat, economist, university professor and former football player. He served as the Ambassador for the Federal Republic of Yugoslavia to South Africa from 1998 to 2001 as well as the Ambassador from Serbia to Montenegro from 2013 to 2019. As a player, he primarily played for Red Star Belgrade throughout the 1970s as a right-back.

== Career as a politician ==
He graduated from the University of Belgrade Faculty of Economics and received his master's degree and doctorate from the Faculty of Law. He then served as vice president and member of the Executive Council of the City of Belgrade from 1988 to 1993 before then serving as Minister of Sports and Minister of Religion in the Federal Government from 1993 to 1998. He was one of the founders of the Socialist Party of Serbia, a party he left after the founding of the Serbian Progressive Party as he joined them instead. He also held the position of Ambassador of the Federal Republic of Yugoslavia to the Republic of South Africa from 1998 to 2001 and the position of Ambassador of Serbia to Montenegro from 2013 to 2019, succeeding Zoran Lutovac.

He also served as chairman and Member of the Intergovernmental Committees for Economic Cooperation and Foreign Affairs Committees, as well as Chairman of the Federal Government's Commission for Cooperation with Religious Communities.

== Career as a footballer ==
Throughout his career, he was first signed up to play for Red Star Belgrade. Despite initially playing as a center forward, he later switched to playing as a right-back at the insistence of club manager Miljan Miljanić. Despite having enough talent to be within the youth team of the Yugoslavia national football team that was captained by Vladimir Petrović, he never made many appearances within the Yugoslav First League. Despite this though, he saw relative success with the club as his debut season saw the club winning the 1972–73 Yugoslav First League with three more titles in the 1976–77, 1979–80 and the 1980–81 Yugoslav First League. He then played his final season with Velež Mostar where he played alongside the BMV trio consisting of Dušan Bajević, Enver Marić and Franjo Vladić.

== Career as a professor ==
Since 1992 he has been working as a professor of economics and finance. He retired as a full professor at the university. He has taught the following subjects: International Financial Economics, Monetary and Public Finance, and Strategic Management.

Bingulac has been the dean of three faculties of economics since 2005: the Faculty of Management, the Faculty of Business Studies and the Faculty of Entrepreneurial Business.

== Personal life ==
Bingulac has stated that he was the only minister in the Government of Serbia who welcomed and visited Serbian refugees from the Republic of Serbian Krajina.

Bingulac is married and has three children with two grandchildren.
