= Petar Krivokuća =

Serbian footballer (born 1947)

Personal information
- Date of birth: 12 June 1947 (age 79)
- Place of birth: Ivanjica, PR Serbia, FPR Yugoslavia
- Position: Defender

Senior career*
Years	Team	Apps	(Gls)
- Javor Ivanjica
1965–1968	Sloboda Titovo Užice	68	(3)
1968–1976	Red Star Belgrade	142	(11)
1976–1977	Iraklis Thessaloniki	13	(0)
1977–1978	Rouen	27	(1)
- Obilić
- Voždovački
Total		250	(15)

International career
1972–1974	Yugoslavia	13	(0)
- * Club domestic league appearances and goals

Petar Krivokuća (Serbian Cyrillic: Петар Кривокућа; born 12 June 1947) is a Serbian former professional footballer who played as a defender.

== Club career ==
After spending three seasons with Sloboda Titovo Užice in the Yugoslav Second League, Krivokuća was signed by Red Star Belgrade in 1968. He spent eight seasons with the club, winning three championship titles and two national cups. During the late 1970s, Krivokuća played professionally in Greece and France.

== International career ==
At international level, Krivokuća was capped 13 times for Yugoslavia, making his national team debut in a 10–0 friendly win over Venezuela on 14 June 1972. He earned his last cap in a 2–2 friendly draw with England on 5 June 1974.

== Personal life ==
Krivokuća is the younger brother of Blagomir Krivokuća and a paternal cousin of Srboljub Krivokuća.

== Honours ==
Red Star Belgrade

- Yugoslav First League: 1968–69, 1969–70, 1972–73
- Yugoslav Cup: 1969–70, 1970–71

Individual

- World Soccer World XI: 1973
