= Stoichkov =

Stoichkov (Bulgarian: Стоичков) is a Bulgarian surname. It may refer to:

- Zdravko Stoichkov (born 1964), Bulgarian weightlifter
- Hristo Stoichkov (born 1966), Bulgarian footballer
- Juan Diego Molina Martínez (born 1993), nicknamed Stoichkov, Spanish footballer
- Georgi Stoichkov (born 1994), Bulgarian footballer
- Toni Stoichkov (born 1995), Bulgarian footballer
- Stoyan Stoichkov (born 2003), Bulgarian footballer

== See also ==
- Stoičkov - Macedonian surname
- Stojičkov - Montenegrin and Serbian surname
