= Trifun Mihailović =

Serbian footballer

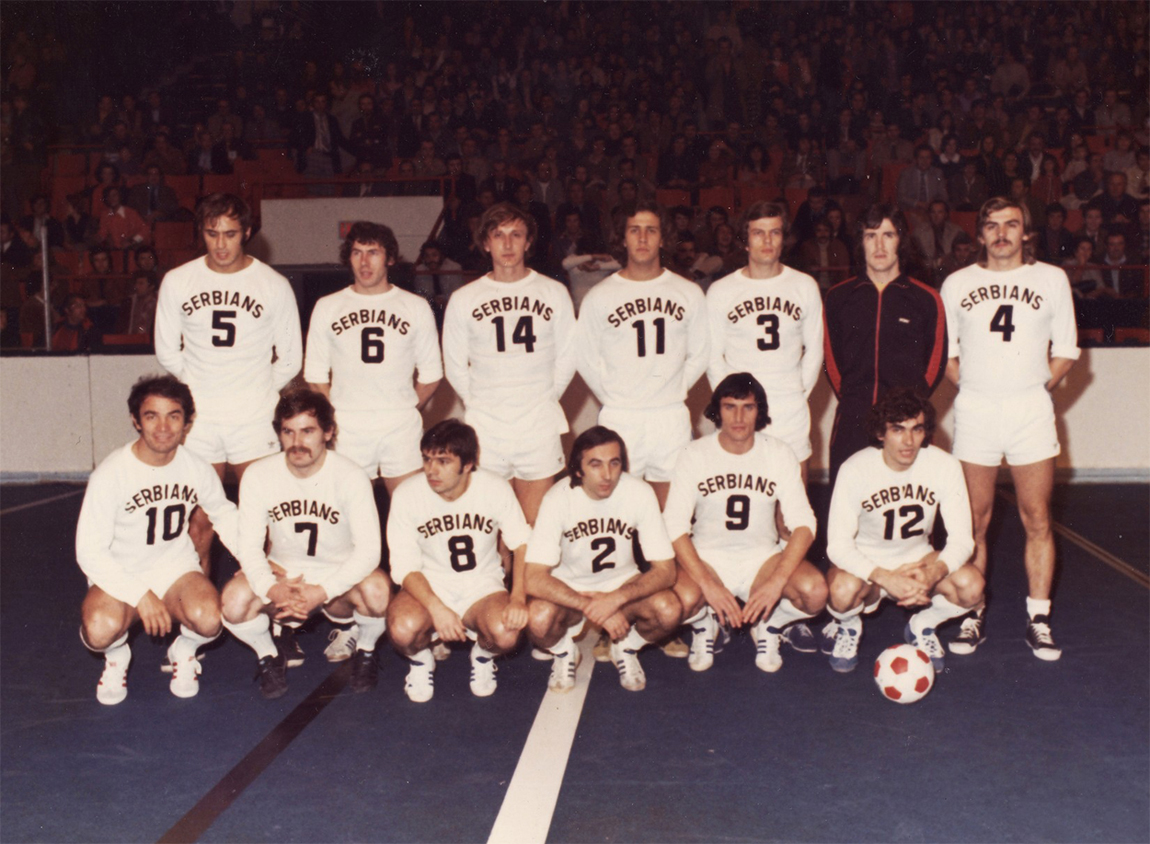
- Mihailović in 1973

Personal information
- Full name: Trifun Mihailović
- Date of birth: 3 October 1947 (age 79)
- Place of birth: Belgrade, FPR Yugoslavia
- Height: 1.58 m (5 ft 2 in)
- Position: Forward

Youth career
- 1959–1964: Red Star Belgrade

Senior career*
Years	Team	Apps	(Gls)
1964–1974	Red Star Belgrade	81	(16)
1974–1975	OFK Beograd		
1975–1977	Serbian White Eagles	3	(0)
1977–1978	Rapid Wien	6	(0)
- * Club domestic league appearances and goals

Trifun Mihailović (Serbian Cyrillic: Трифун Михаиловић; born 10 March 1947) is a Serbian retired professional footballer.

Known for his short stature and by his nickname of Trifke, Mihailović scored the first official goal at the newly-opened Red Star Stadium in a youth match between Red Star Belgrade and Jedinstvo Zemun in 1963.

== Notes ==
1. His surname is sometimes incorrectly spelled as Mihajlović.
