= Alexander Casey =

Irish footballer

Alexander Casey (also Alex Casey or Al Casey) is an Irish footballer who played for Waterford FC in the late 1960s and early 1970s, winning four league titles in the space of six years.

Al died as a result of a two-car collision near Tipperary Town on his way back from a reserve game in Limerick on 6 December 1981.

A memorial match was held for his family in 1982 when Waterford played a Jackie Morley selection in Kilcohan Park. The 'Waterford Soccer Monthly' magazine launched a monthly 'Al Casey Award', sponsored by Waterford Crystal, for outstanding contributions to soccer locally.
