= Salem Halilhodžić =

Bosnian footballer (1942–2012)

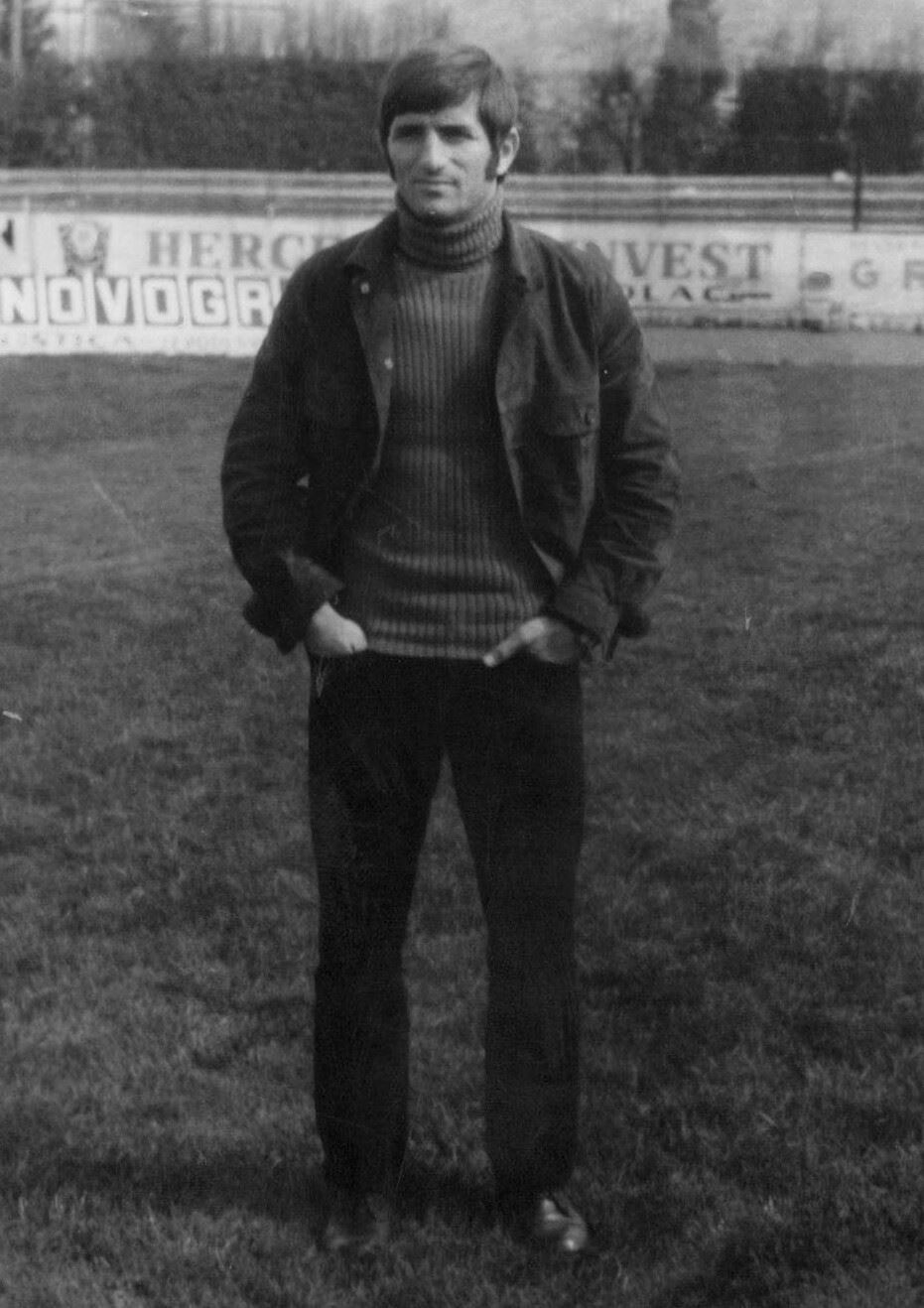

Personal information
- Full name: Salem Halilhodžić
- Date of birth: 5 July 1942
- Place of birth: Jablanica, Pliva-Rama, Croatia
- Date of death: 21 November 2012 (aged 70)
- Place of death: Vienna, Austria
- Position: Forward

Senior career*
Years	Team	Apps	(Gls)
1964–1973	Velež Mostar	197	(66)
1973–1976	Preußen Münster	15	(1)
- * Club domestic league appearances and goals

Salem Halilhodžić (5 July 1942 – 21 November 2012) was a Bosnian football player and manager. He played as a forward for Velež Mostar and Preußen Münster throughout the 1960s and the 1970s, being the top scorer for both clubs throughout various seasons.

== Career as a player ==
Salem was born on 5 July 1942 at Jablanica during World War II and was the older brother of Bosnian international Vahid Halilhodžić who would also play for Velež Mostar at his insistence. Halilhodžić began his career within the youth ranks of Velež Mostar before graduating to the senior roster during the 1964–65 Yugoslav First League where the club had a mediocre performance at 13th place out of 15 teams. Despite this rough start, Halilhodžić would become one of the most talented players within the team, making more than 400 appearances with 197 of those being within the Yugoslav First League and scoring 220 goals throughout his career with 66 of those being within the League. A particular highlight of his career was through the 6–0 beating against Dinamo Zagreb on 24 May 1970, in which he scored four goals in the match and became the top scorer of the club for the 1969–70 Yugoslav First League. During the 1971–72 season, he would once again become the top scorer for the club with his three goals in the 3–0 victory against Red Star Belgrade and would be one of the top scorers for the club throughout the early 1970s alongside Dušan Bajević and was part of the same generation as players such as Enver Marić and Franjo Vladić.

His success within the Yugoslav domestic league would catch the attention of Preußen Münster and would sign him to play in the final season of the old Regionalliga tournament in the 1973–74 Regionalliga as despite reaching 5th place in the Regionalliga West, they would successfully qualify for the 2. Bundesliga. Halilhodžić would spend the remainder of his career as a player within the 2. Bundesliga until his retirement at the end of the 1975–76 season.

== Career as a manager ==
Following his retirement as a player, Halilhodžić would return to study in college until he graduated with a degree in physics and mathematics. With this, he returned to Velež to manage the youth sector of the club in the 1989–90 season and would win the Yugoslav Youth Cup that season during a turbulent era for the club. He remained in this position until 20 February 1990 and would go without any other managerial position due to the outbreak of the Yugoslav Wars. He would later find work within the Saudi Arabia Olympic football team and spent his final years training Al-Ittihad Club.

== Personal life ==
Halilhodžić died on 21 November 2012 whilst on a visit in Vienna.
