= Poul-Erik Thygesen =

Danish footballer (born 1950)

Personal information
- Date of birth: 17 July 1950 (age 76)
- Place of birth: Gentofte, Denmark
- Position: Forward

Senior career*
| Years | Team | Apps | (Gls) |
| 1968–1973 | B 1903 | | |
| 1973–1975 | Werder Bremen | 20 | (4) |
| 1975–1977 | FC Winterthur | | |
| 1977–1978 | Glostrup IC | | |
| 1979–1980 | B 1903 | | |
- * Club domestic league appearances and goals

Poul-Erik Thygesen (born 17 July 1950) is a Danish former professional footballer who played as a forward.
