= Osman Maglajlić =

Bosnian sports administrator

13th President of the Assembly of FK Sarajevo
- In office 1969–1970
- Preceded by: Milivoje Šteković
- Succeeded by: Izet Buševac

Personal details
- Born: 28 April 1921 Banja Luka, Kingdom of Yugoslavia
- Died: 4 August 2010 (aged 89) Sarajevo, Bosnia and Herzegovina
- Profession: Sports administrator

Osman Maglajlić (28 April 1921 – 4 August 2010) was a notable Bosnian and Yugoslav sports administrator. He was one of the founders of FK Sarajevo and later club president of the assembly, two-term board member of the Football Association of Yugoslavia and notable committee member and later director of USD Bosna.

As a delegate of FK Sarajevo, he was elected president of the Football Association of the Sarajevo region, as well as vice president of the Football Association of Bosnia and Herzegovina, and a member of the Football Association of Yugoslavia, where he served two terms of four years each. He received the May Award of the Union of Physical Culture Organizations of Bosnia and Herzegovina in 1966, and a silver badge on the occasion of the 70th anniversary of the Football Association of Bosnia and Herzegovina in 1978.

In addition to football, Osman Maglajlić contributed significantly to the development of athletics in Bosnia and Herzegovina, as he served as the president of the Athletic Federation of Bosnia and Herzegovina and was dedicated to the sport for decades.

He received numerous state decorations and awards for his work in sports organizations. For his contribution to sports in Bosnia and Herzegovina, he was awarded a lifetime achievement award at the Best Athletes of Bosnia and Herzegovina event in 2008.

His cousin Vahida Maglajlić (17 April 1907 – 1 April 1943) was a Yugoslav Partisan recognized as a People's Hero of Yugoslavia for her part in the struggle against the Axis powers during World War II.
