= Blagomir Krivokuća =

Serbian footballer (1944–2023)

Blagoje Krivokuća
Personal information
- Full name: Blagomir Krivokuća
- Date of birth: 11 September 1944
- Place of birth: Ivanjica, German-occupied Serbia
- Date of death: 14 July 2023 (aged 78)
- Place of death: Belgrade, Serbia
- Position: Defender

Senior career*
Years	Team	Apps	(Gls)
1960–1962	Javor Ivanjica		
1962–1971	OFK Beograd	170	(15)
1971–1974	Freiburger FC	64	(7)
Total		234	(22)

Managerial career
- 1993–1995: OFK Beograd
- * Club domestic league appearances and goals

Blagomir "Blagoje" Krivokuća (Serbian Cyrillic: Благомир Благоје Кривокућа; 11 September 1944 – 14 July 2023) was a Serbian football manager and player. He was the older brother of fellow footballer Petar Krivokuća.

== Career ==
After starting out at his hometown club Javor Ivanjica, Krivokuća was signed by OFK Beograd in 1962. He spent nine years with the Romantičari, making 170 appearances and scoring 15 goals in the Yugoslav First League. In 1971, Krivokuća moved abroad to Germany and joined Freiburger FC. He played for three seasons in the Regionalliga Süd, netting seven times in 64 games.

He also managed OFK for two seasons.

== Death ==
Blagomir Krivokuća died on 14 July 2023, at the age of 78.

== Honours ==
OFK Beograd

- Yugoslav Cup: 1965–66
