= 1969–70 Yugoslav First League =

Prva savezna liga
- Season: 1969–70
- Dates: 24 August 1969 – 28 June 1970
- Champions: Red Star (10th title)
- Relegated: Vardar; NK Zagreb
- European Cup: Red Star
- Cup Winners' Cup: Olimpija
- Inter-Cities Fairs Cup: Partizan; Željezničar; Dinamo Zagreb; Hajduk Split
- Top goalscorer: Dušan Bajević; Slobodan Santrač (20 goals each)

The 1969–70 Yugoslav First League season was the 24th season of the First Federal League (Serbo-Croatian: Prva savezna liga), the top level association football league of SFR Yugoslavia, since its establishment in 1946. Eighteen teams contested the competition, with Red Star winning their tenth national title.

== Events and incidents ==
=== Week 13: NK Olimpija's November 1969 match-fixing attempt ===
[When we first met to talk] I had zero inkling about his [Franetič's] true intentions. He started the conversation by offering me a move to Olimpija, bringing up—what was already well known and evident throughout the league—that they had been having issues with goalies for a while. It was after I informed him I'm under contract at FK Sarajevo and stating I have no intention of leaving that he began to reveal what he really wanted.

— FK Sarajevo goalkeeper Refik Muftić on the November 1969 match-fixing approach by NK Olimpija board member Anton Franetič.

Shortly prior to the Sunday, 16 November 1969 league fixture in Sarajevo between FK Sarajevo and Olimpija Ljubljana, the authorities were made aware—by Sarajevo's goalkeeper Refik Muftić—about a bribery attempt by Olimpija's club board member Anton Franetič who had reportedly offered the goalkeeper up to 20,000 Yugoslav new dinars in return for throwing the match.

According to Muftić, he first got approached at his Sarajevo apartment in the early morning hours of Thursday, 13 November 1969—three days prior to the upcoming league fixture versus Olimpija—by a male individual, previously unknown to him, who showed up at his door introducing himself as NK Olimpija's board member and asking if they can talk. At that point, the two arranged to meet around noon at Kristal-bar, a kafana in Ilidža on the outskirts of Sarajevo, where the individual—NK Olimpija board member as well as the Ljubljana Credit Bank (Ljubljanska kreditna banka i štedionica) management board member Anton Franetič—would eventually get around to making FK Sarajevo's goalkeeper Muftić a monetary offer in exchange for throwing the upcoming match between the two teams.

According to the offer, Muftić was to receive YUD10,000 (new dinars) if the match finishes as a tie and YUD20,000 (new dinars) if NK Olimpija wins with Franetič even musing about the possible contrived behaviour Muftić could opt for during the match—either purposely not attempting to make a save during a shot on goal or intentionally fouling an Olimpija player in the penalty area that would hopefully lead to the referee awarding a penalty shot. Additionally, Franetič handed Muftić an advance of YUD200,000 (old dinars) in cash while stating the rest would be paid out after the match. Immediately after his meeting with Franetič, Muftić informed the FK Sarajevo club president Osman Maglajlić of the match-fixing bribery attempt and handed him the money he took from Franetič. In turn, Maglajlić alerted the authorities who put together a sting operation, instructing Muftić to wear a recording device during his subsequent meetings with Franetič. The two met again that same Thursday during evening hours and talked in Muftić's car.

Two days later, on the Saturday one day ahead of the match, the two met again; this time in Sarajevo's Princ cafe where Franetič informed Muftić that the rest of the money, YUD1.8 million (old dinars), is ready and that NK Olimpija's club president and general secretary had signed off on everything. Franetič further stated that the match referee is also on the take and will call a penalty for Olimpija during which Muftić should dive in the opposite direction. Just like during their conversation in his car, Muftić also wore a recording device during this meeting.

Sarajevo ended up winning the match 4-1 while goalkeeper Muftić was forced to leave the contest early due to picking up an injury after colliding with Olimpija player Radoslav Bečejac. After Muftić's injury, Ibrahim Sirćo replaced him between the posts in Sarajevo's goal. Immediately following the match, Olimpija club board member Anton Franetič got arrested. When confronted with the incriminating evidence—audio recordings of his two meetings with Muftić as well as the YUD20,000 advance he handed the goalkeeper—Franetič quickly admitting to wrongdoing and had a criminal investigation request submitted against him by the Secretariat for Internal Affairs (SUP) for match-fixing attempt and misuse of the official post, a charge that had it been brought carried a maximum fine of 10 years in prison according to act 314 of SFR Yugoslavia's Criminal Code. NK Olimpija club president Srečko Rihtar's and general secretary Stane Vrhovnik's defense was attempting to distance themselves from Franetič, denying any prior knowledge of their club board member's match-fixing attempts.

About a month later, on 26 December 1969, following an investigation and hearing, the Yugoslav First League Clubs' Association's disciplinary court (disciplinski sud) handed down its punishment:

- NK Olimpija was punished by having three points docked
- NK Olimpija board member Anton Franetič received a lifelong ban on performing any football-related official functions
- NK Olimpija club president Srečko Rihtar received a one-year ban on performing any football-related official functions
- NK Olimpija club general secretary Stane Vrhovnik received a six-month ban on performing any football-related official functions

Amazingly, none of the Yugoslav First League Clubs' Association's disciplinary court decisions were ever enacted nor were any individuals—including Franetič who admitted guilt—criminally charged. The entire case was swept under the carpet and soon forgotten.

== League table ==
Pos	Team	Pld	W	D	L	GF	GA	GD	Pts	Qualification or relegation
1	Red Star Belgrade (C)	34	20	6	8	67	37	+30	46	Qualification for European Cup first round
2	Partizan	34	16	12	6	47	27	+20	44	Invitation for Inter-Cities Fairs Cup first round
3	Velež	34	17	9	8	64	44	+20	43	
4	Željezničar	34	17	9	8	52	33	+19	43	Invitation for Inter-Cities Fairs Cup first round
5	OFK Belgrade	34	13	12	9	53	32	+21	38	
6	Dinamo Zagreb	34	13	12	9	47	42	+5	38	Invitation for Inter-Cities Fairs Cup first round
7	Hajduk Split	34	16	5	13	51	37	+14	37	Invitation for Inter-Cities Fairs Cup first round
8	Radnički Niš	34	14	9	11	36	33	+3	37	
9	Sloboda Tuzla	34	11	13	10	35	34	+1	35	
10	Maribor	34	13	7	14	40	51	−11	33	
11	Vojvodina	34	11	10	13	38	42	−4	32	
12	Sarajevo	34	9	12	13	32	42	−10	30	
13	Čelik	34	10	10	14	35	48	−13	30	
14	Bor	34	6	16	12	32	47	−15	28	
15	Radnički Kragujevac	34	11	5	18	34	42	−8	27	
16	Olimpija	34	13	4	17	43	52	−9	27	Qualification for Cup Winners' Cup first round
17	Vardar (R)	34	9	8	17	25	46	−21	26	Relegation to Yugoslav Second League
18	NK Zagreb (R)	34	4	7	23	22	64	−42	15	Relegation to Yugoslav Second League

Source: rsssf.org
Rules for classification: 1) points; 2) goal difference; 3) number of goals scored.
(C) Champions; (R) Relegated

== Results ==
Home \ Away	BOR	ČEL	DIN	HAJ	MAR	OFK	OLI	PAR	RDK	RNI	RSB	SAR	SLO	VAR	VEL	VOJ	ZAG	ŽEL
Bor		1–1	1–1	1–1	2–1	0–0	2–1	0–0	0–0	0–1	2–2	0–0	1–1	5–0	2–1	1–1	1–0	0–1
Čelik	1–1		0–0	3–1	3–0	1–1	2–1	1–3	1–1	1–1	3–2	1–0	1–0	1–1	3–0	1–0	1–1	1–0
Dinamo Zagreb	3–2	1–3		3–1	1–3	1–1	3–2	2–0	2–1	0–0	2–0	1–2	4–0	1–1	2–2	2–0	4–0	2–2
Hajduk Split	5–0	2–0	0–1		3–0	2–1	1–0	1–1	1–0	2–0	0–0	3–1	1–0	1–1	4–2	3–0	5–0	2–0
Maribor	0–1	3–0	0–0	2–0		3–2	3–2	0–0	1–0	2–0	0–1	3–0	1–1	2–0	0–2	1–1	1–0	1–1
OFK Belgrade	1–1	1–0	2–0	1–1	1–4		3–0	0–1	0–0	2–0	4–2	2–0	1–0	5–0	4–2	0–0	5–0	5–0
Olimpija	0–0	2–0	1–2	2–0	2–1	1–1		0–0	0–1	0–1	1–2	6–0	4–2	2–0	0–4	3–2	1–0	0–4
Partizan	3–1	2–0	0–0	2–0	7–1	1–1	2–0		1–4	1–0	1–3	3–0	0–0	1–0	1–2	1–0	2–0	0–2
Radnički Kragujevac	3–1	3–1	3–1	1–3	0–2	1–3	0–1	1–1		0–2	0–1	2–1	1–1	1–0	1–0	1–0	3–2	1–0
Radnički Niš	2–1	4–0	2–1	3–2	1–1	1–1	0–2	0–1	2–0		1–1	1–0	0–0	3–1	1–0	2–0	2–0	1–1
Red Star	5–3	3–0	2–2	1–0	3–1	3–1	3–0	1–1	2–1	2–0		3–0	3–1	3–0	5–0	2–0	3–0	1–4
Sarajevo	0–0	1–1	1–1	4–0	4–0	0–2	4–1	0–0	1–0	0–0	0–0		1–1	1–0	1–3	1–2	3–1	0–0
Sloboda Tuzla	2–0	1–0	0–0	2–0	2–0	0–0	2–0	0–0	2–1	2–0	1–3	1–1		1–0	1–1	3–1	2–0	2–0
Vardar	0–0	2–2	1–0	1–0	0–1	1–0	0–1	1–2	2–1	1–2	3–2	1–0	2–0		3–3	1–1	1–0	1–0
Velež	3–0	2–1	6–0	0–2	5–0	2–1	3–1	3–0	2–1	1–0	1–0	0–0	3–1	1–0		2–2	2–1	2–2
Vojvodina	3–0	2–1	1–2	1–0	3–2	2–1	1–2	1–2	2–1	1–1	1–0	2–2	0–0	2–0	0–0		3–1	2–0
NK Zagreb	1–1	1–0	0–2	2–4	3–0	0–0	1–2	0–5	1–0	2–1	0–2	0–1	2–2	0–0	3–3	0–0		0–1
Željezničar	3–1	4–0	2–0	1–0	0–0	2–0	2–2	2–2	2–0	4–1	3–1	1–2	2–1	1–0	1–1	3–1	1–0	

Source: DataSoccer.it
Legend: Blue = home team win; Yellow = draw; Red = away team win.

== Top scorers ==
Rank	Player	Club	Goals
1	(Socialist Federal Republic of Yugoslavia) Slobodan Santrač	OFK Belgrade	20
1	(Socialist Federal Republic of Yugoslavia) Dušan Bajević	Velež	20
3	(Socialist Federal Republic of Yugoslavia) Josip Bukal	Željezničar	18
4	(Socialist Federal Republic of Yugoslavia) Dragan Džajić	Red Star	13
4	(Socialist Federal Republic of Yugoslavia) Salem Halilhodžić	Velež	13
6	(Socialist Federal Republic of Yugoslavia) Vojin Lazarević	Red Star	12
7	(Socialist Federal Republic of Yugoslavia) Jurica Jerković	Hajduk Split	11
8	(Socialist Federal Republic of Yugoslavia) Stanislav Karasi	Red Star	10
8	(Socialist Federal Republic of Yugoslavia) Nenad Cvetković	Radnički Niš	10

== See also ==
- 1969–70 Yugoslav Cup
- Yugoslav League Championship
- Football Association of Yugoslavia
