= Stanislav Karasi =

Serbian football manager and player

Personal information
- Full name: Stanislav Karasi
- Date of birth: 8 November 1946 (age 79)
- Place of birth: Belgrade, PR Serbia, FPR Yugoslavia
- Height: 1.72 m (5 ft 8 in)
- Position: Forward

Youth career
- Partizan
- Red Star Belgrade

Senior career*
Years	Team	Apps	(Gls)
1966–1969	Borovo	49	(24)
1969–1974	Red Star Belgrade	150	(57)
1974–1977	Lille	109	(35)
1977–1979	Royal Antwerp	27	(5)
1979–1980	Buffalo Stallions (indoor)	30	(17)
1981–1982	OFK Beograd	19	(1)
1982	New York Arrows (indoor)	16	(5)
- Hajduk Beograd
- Sinđelić Beograd
Total		400	(144)

International career
1973–1974	Yugoslavia	10	(4)

Managerial career
- 1991: Spartak Subotica
- Al-Yarmouk
- Sutjeska Nikšić
- 1996: Radnički Kragujevac
- 1997–1998: Milicionar
- Radnički Beograd
- 2000: Obilić
- 2000: Erzurumspor
- 2001: Mladost Lučani
- 2002: Zvezdara
- 2004: Bežanija
- 2005–2006: BASK
- 2007: Borac Banja Luka
- 2009–2010: Al-Yarmouk
- * Club domestic league appearances and goals

Stanislav Karasi (Serbian Cyrillic: Станислав Караси; born 8 November 1946) is a Serbian former football manager and player.

== Club career ==
After coming through the youth system of Red Star Belgrade, Karasi started his senior career with Yugoslav Second League side Borovo. He returned to Red Star Belgrade in 1969, spending the next five years with the club. Overall, Karasi amassed 150 appearances and scored 57 goals in the Yugoslav First League, helping the team win the title on three occasions (1969, 1970, and 1973).

In 1974, after meeting the Yugoslav FA transfer eligibility requirements, Karasi decided to go abroad to France and signed with Lille. He spent three seasons with the club, making 109 league appearances and scoring 35 goals. In 1977, Karasi moved to Belgium and played for Royal Antwerp until 1979. He subsequently went to the United States to play indoor soccer with the Buffalo Stallions. In 1981, Karasi returned to Yugoslavia and joined OFK Beograd, but moved back to the Major Indoor Soccer League by signing with the New York Arrows in March 1982. He would finish his career with time at two Belgrade clubs, Hajduk and Sinđelić.

== International career ==
At international level, Karasi represented Yugoslavia between 1973 and 1974, collecting 10 caps and scoring four goals. He appeared at the 1974 FIFA World Cup, netting twice in the process.

== Managerial career ==
After hanging up his boots, Karasi was manager of numerous clubs, including Obilić, Erzurumspor (Turkey), Mladost Lučani, Zvezdara, Bežanija, BASK, and Borac Banja Luka (Bosnia and Herzegovina).

Between 2009 and 2010, Karasi served his second term as manager of Kuwaiti club Al-Yarmouk.

== Personal life ==
Karasi is the son-in-law of Yugoslav People's Army general Veljko Kadijević.

== Career statistics ==
Appearances and goals by national team and year
National team	Year	Apps	Goals
Yugoslavia	1973	4	2
Yugoslavia	1974	6	2
Total		10	4

== Honours ==
Red Star Belgrade

- Yugoslav First League: 1968–69, 1969–70, 1972–73
- Yugoslav Cup: 1969–70, 1970–71
