= Vili Ameršek =

Slovenian footballer

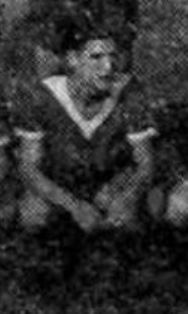

Personal information
- Full name: Viliam Ameršek
- Date of birth: 16 June 1948 (age 78)
- Place of birth: Trbovlje, FPR Yugoslavia
- Position: Midfielder

Senior career*
Years	Team	Apps	(Gls)
1966–1976	Olimpija Ljubljana		
1976–1979	Angers	83	(10)
1979–1984	Olimpija Ljubljana	152	(36)
- * Club domestic league appearances and goals

Viliam "Vili" Ameršek (born 16 August 1948) is a retired Slovenian football player who played in a midfielder role.

== Club career ==
He holds the record for seasons played for Olimpija Ljubljana with 16 and played 432 games for the club, scoring 106 goals. While at Olimpija, he played with his brother Peter and formed a famous trio with Branko Oblak and Danilo Popivoda.

He also had a spell of 3 years with Angers SCO.
