= Branko Klenkovski =

Yugoslav footballer

Personal information
- Full name: Branko Klenkovski
- Date of birth: 25 September 1946
- Place of birth: Belgrade, SFR Yugoslavia
- Date of death: 12 July 2013 (aged 66)
- Place of death: Belgrade, Serbia
- Position: Defender

Senior career*
Years	Team	Apps	(Gls)
1965–1974	Red Star Belgrade	155	(12)
1977–1978	Proleter Zrenjanin		
- * Club domestic league appearances and goals

Branko Klenkovski (25 September 1946 – 12 July 2013) was a Yugoslav footballer of Macedonian descendant .

== Honours ==
- Champion

1968,1969,1970,1973

- Cup Winner

1968,1970,1971
