= 2011–12 Red Star Belgrade season =

Red Star Belgrade
2011–12 season
- President: (Serbia) Vladan Lukić
- Head coach: (Croatia) Robert Prosinečki
- Stadium: Stadion Crvena Zvezda
- SuperLiga: 2nd
- Serbian Cup: Champions
- Europa League: Play-off round
- Top goalscorer: League: Cadú (11); All: Borja (14)
- Highest home attendance: 54,000 (vs Stade Rennais, 18 August 2011)
- Lowest home attendance: 0 (vs Vojvodina, 10 December 2011)
- Average home league attendance: 22,528
Home colours	Away colours	Third colours

In season 2011-12 Red Star Belgrade were competing in Serbian SuperLiga, Serbian Cup and UEFA Europa League.

== Previous season positions ==
The club competed in Serbian SuperLiga, Serbian Cup in domestic and UEFA Europa League in European competitions. Finishing 2nd in domestic league, behind Partizan, reached semi-final of domestic cup where they lost to Partizan, and losing to Slovak cup winners Slovan Bratislava in third qualifying round for UEFA Europa League.

	Competition	Position
(European Union)	UEFA Europa League	Third qualifying round
(Serbia)	Serbian SuperLiga	2nd
(Serbia)	Serbian Cup	Semi final

== Kit ==
Red Star Belgrade players will wear a kit made by Nike for the 2011–12 season. The home colors are of a typical Red-White design similar to the one that was worn the previous season. The Away Kit is also similar to the previous season's kit.

== Players ==
=== Squad statistics ===
Nation	No.	Player	SuperLiga		Serbian Cup		Europa League		Total		Discipline	
Nation	No.	Player	Apps.		Apps.		Apps.		Apps.		Yellow card	Red card
Goalkeepers
(Montenegro) ^{1}	1	Boban Bajković	29	0	3	0	4	0	36	0	1	0
(Serbia)	22	Miloš Vesić	0	0	1	0	0	0	1	0	0	1
(Serbia)	31	Marko Dmitrović	0	0	0	0	0	0	0	0	0	0
(Serbia)	32	Aleksandar Kirovski	1	0	2	0	0	0	3	0	0	0
Defenders
(Serbia)	3	Duško Tošić	16	1	3	0	4	0	23	1	7	0
(Serbia)	5	Uroš Ćosić	7	0	2	0	2	0	11	0	1	0
(Serbia)	6	Jovan Krneta	8	0	0	0	0	0	8	0	1	0
(Serbia)	13	Nikola Maksimović	12	0	3	0	0	0	15	0	3	0
(Serbia)	14	Nikola Mikić	24	3	3	0	4	0	31	3	2	0
(Serbia)	24	Filip Stojković	1	0	3	0	0	0	4	0	1	0
(Serbia)	25	Filip Mladenović	12	2	3	0	0	0	15	2	2	0
(Serbia)	30	Danijel Mihajlović	0	0	0	0	0	0	0	0	0	0
(Serbia)	55	Nikola Petković	12	0	2	0	0	0	14	0	1	0
(Serbia)	––	Milan Vilotić	9	0	1	0	3	0	13	0	4	0
Midfielders
(Serbia)	4	Srđan Mijailović	21	0	5	0	3	0	29	0	8	1
(Serbia)	7	Miloš Dimitrijević	25	1	5	0	4	0	34	1	2	0
(Serbia)	8	Darko Lazović	27	7	6	1	4	1	37	9	3	0
(Brazil) ^{1}	10	Evandro Goebel	25	8	6	3	2	0	33	11	7	0
(Brazil)	11	Vinícius Pacheco	2	0	0	0	0	0	2	0	0	0
(Serbia)	15	Luka Milivojević	11	1	3	0	0	0	14	1	6	1
(Brazil)	20	Cadú	20	11	2	0	4	1	26	12	5	0
(Serbia)	21	Marko Perović	2	0	0	0	0	0	2	0	0	0
(Serbia)	23	Petar Đuričković	2	0	0	0	0	0	2	0	1	0
(Serbia)	26	Filip Janković	1	0	1	0	1	0	3	0	0	0
(Serbia)	27	Marko Mirić	11	1	1	0	0	0	12	1	1	0
(Montenegro) ^{1}	29	Marko Vešović	23	1	5	0	2	0	30	1	7	0
Forwards
(Serbia)	16	Luka Milunović	11	4	3	1	0	0	14	5	1	0
(Montenegro) ^{1}	17	Filip Kasalica	13	2	3	1	0	0	16	3	1	0
(Serbia)	18	Ognjen Ožegović	0	0	0	0	0	0	0	0	0	0
(Colombia)	19	Cristian Borja	29	8	5	4	4	2	38	14	6	0
(Ghana)	77	Nathaniel Asamoah	1	0	0	0	0	0	1	0	0	0
Players sold or loaned out during the season
(Ghana)	DF	Lee Addy	13	0	2	0	1	0	16	0	3	0
(Montenegro) ^{1}	DF	Stevan Reljić	7	0	2	0	1	0	10	0	0	0
(Serbia)	MF	Nenad Kovačević	12	0	2	0	4	0	18	0	5	0
(Serbia)	MF	Milan Jeremić	2	0	0	0	0	0	2	0	0	0
(Brazil)	MF	Sávio	1	0	1	0	0	0	2	0	0	0
(Serbia)	FW	Andrija Kaluđerović	15	6	3	1	4	3	22	10	2	0
(Brazil)	FW	Bruno Mezenga	11	1	3	2	4	2	18	5	2	0
Updated 20 May 2012

1 These players also hold Serbian citizenship.

=== Top scorers ===
Includes all competitive matches. The list is sorted by shirt number when total goals are equal.

Position	Nation	Name	League	Cup	Europe	Total
1	(Colombia)	Cristian Borja	8	4	2	14
2	(Brazil)	Cadú	11	0	1	12
3	(Brazil)	Evandro Goebel	8	3	0	11
4	(Serbia)	Andrija Kaluđerović	6	1	3	10
5	(Serbia)	Darko Lazović	7	1	1	9

Updated 16 May 2012

=== Player transfer ===
==== In ====
No.	Pos.	Player	Moving from	Fee	Transfer Window
2	MF	(Brazil) Sávio Oliveira do Vale	(China) Changchun Yatai	Loan return	Summer
6	DF	(Serbia) Nikola Ignjatijević	(Romania) Politehnica Timișoara	Loan return	Summer
24	DF	(Serbia) Filip Stojković	Promoted from youth squad	Free	Summer
26	MF	(Serbia) Filip Janković	Promoted from youth squad	Free	Summer
27	MF	(Serbia) Goran Čaušić	Promoted from youth squad	Free	Summer
7	MF	(Serbia) Miloš Dimitrijević	(Serbia) Rad	317K €	Summer
11	MF	(Brazil) Vinícius Pacheco	(Brazil) Flamengo	211K €	Summer
9	FW	(Brazil) Bruno Mezenga	(Brazil) Flamengo	Loan	Summer
32	GK	(Serbia) Aleksandar Kirovski	(Serbia) Zemun	Free	Summer
22	GK	(Serbia) Miloš Vesić	(Serbia) Novi Sad	Free	Summer
33	MF	(Serbia) Nenad Kovačević	(France) RC Lens	Free	Summer
55	DF	(Serbia) Nikola Petković	(Germany) Eintracht Frankfurt	Free	Summer
6	DF	(Serbia) Jovan Krneta	Promoted from youth squad	Free	Winter
23	MF	(Serbia) Petar Đuričković	Promoted from youth squad	Free	Winter
18	FW	(Serbia) Ognjen Ožegović	Promoted from youth squad	Free	Winter
21	MF	(Serbia) Marko Perović	(United States) New England Revolution	Free	Winter
25	DF	(Serbia) Filip Mladenović	(Serbia) Borac Čačak	315K €	Winter
15	MF	(Serbia) Luka Milivojević	(Serbia) Rad	500K €	Winter
3	DF	(Serbia) Duško Tošić	(Spain) Real Betis	Loan return	Winter
17	FW	(Montenegro) Filip Kasalica	(Serbia) Sloboda Užice	200K €	Winter
13	DF	(Serbia) Nikola Maksimović	(Serbia) Sloboda Užice	300K €	Winter
27	MF	(Serbia) Marko Mirić	(Serbia) Spartak Subotica	100K €	Winter
77	FW	(Ghana) Nathaniel Asamoah	(Ghana) Asante Kotoko	200K €	Winter
16	FW	(Serbia) Luka Milunović	(Belgium) Zulte Waregem	Free	Winter

Total Expenditure: ▼2.143M €

==== Out ====
Pos.	Player	Moving to	Fee	Transfer Window
MF	(Serbia) Ognjen Koroman	(Russia) Krylia Sovetov Samara	Free	Summer
MF	(Serbia) Dejan Milovanović	(France) Lens	Loan return	Summer
GK	(Serbia) Saša Stamenković	(Azerbaijan) Neftchi Baku	630K €	Summer
DF	(Serbia) Pavle Ninkov	(France) Toulouse FC	1.05M €	Summer
MF	(Ghana) Mohammed-Awal Issah	(Norway) Rosenborg	740K €	Summer
FW	(Serbia) Aleksandar Jevtić	(China) Jiangsu Sainty	845K €	Summer
FW	(Serbia) Slavko Perović	(Serbia) Rad	Free	Summer
MF	(Serbia) Andrej Mrkela	(Serbia) Rad	Free	Summer
MF	(Serbia) Vladan Binić	(Serbia) Radnički 1923	Loan	Summer
MF	(Serbia) Nenad Srećković	(Netherlands) De Graafschap	Undisclosed	Summer
DF	(Serbia) Duško Tošić	(Spain) Real Betis	Loan	Summer
MF	(Montenegro) Nemanja Nikolić	(Serbia) OFK Beograd	Free	Summer
MF	(Montenegro) Marko Mugoša	(Serbia) Novi Pazar	Loan	Summer
DF	(Serbia) Bojan Đorđević	(Serbia) Napredak Kruševac	Loan	Summer
MF	(Serbia) Marko Nikolić	(Serbia) Napredak Kruševac	Loan	Summer
FW	(Montenegro) Stefan Denković	(Israel) Hapoel Haifa	Undisclosed	Summer
FW	(Serbia) Miloš Reljić	(Bulgaria) Lokomotiv Plovdiv	Undisclosed	Summer
FW	(Brazil) Bruno Mezenga	(Brazil) Flamengo	Loan return	Winter
DF	(Ghana) Lee Addy	(China) Dalian Aerbin	1.7M €	Winter
MF	(Serbia) Nenad Kovačević	(Azerbaijan) FK Baku	Free	Winter
MF	(Serbia) Milan Jeremić	(Serbia) Borac Čačak	Free	Winter
MF	(Brazil) Sávio	(Brazil) Avenida	Free	Winter
MF	(Serbia) Goran Čaušić	(Serbia) Rad	Free	Winter
DF	(Serbia) Nikola Ignjatijević	(Ukraine) Zorya Luhansk	Free	Winter
MF	(Montenegro) Marko Mugoša	(Serbia) Borac Čačak	Free	Winter
DF	(Montenegro) Stevan Reljić	(Serbia) Borac Čačak	Loan	Winter
DF	(Serbia) Bojan Đorđević	(Serbia) Radnički Niš	Loan	Winter
MF	(Serbia) Aleksandar Kovačević	(Serbia) Spartak Subotica	Free	Winter
MF	(Serbia) Vladan Binić	(Serbia) Spartak Subotica	Loan	Winter
FW	(Serbia) Miloš Trifunović	(China) Liaoning Whowin	325K €	Winter
FW	(Serbia) Andrija Kaluđerović	(China) Beijing Guoan	Undisclosed	Winter

Total Income: ▲5.290M €

== Competitions ==
=== Serbian SuperLiga ===
Red Star Belgrade competed with 15 other teams in the 6th season of Serbian SuperLiga. They finished second, for a third time in a row, behind Partizan

==== League table ====
Pos	Team	Pld	W	D	L	GF	GA	GD	Pts	Qualification or relegation
1	Partizan (C)	30	26	2	2	67	12	+55	80	Qualification for Champions League second qualifying round
2	Red Star Belgrade	30	21	5	4	57	18	+39	68	Qualification for Europa League second qualifying round (Note: Red Star as 2011–12 Serbian Cup winners qualified for the second qualifying round of the UEFA Europa League. Since they finished second in the league, the third-placed team also qualified for the Europa League second qualifying round, and the fourth-placed team qualified for the Europa League first qualifying round.)
3	Vojvodina	30	14	10	6	44	26	+18	52	Qualification for Europa League second qualifying round
4	Jagodina	30	14	9	7	34	20	+14	51 (Note: Head-to-head points: Jagodina: 4 pts, Sloboda Užice: 1 pts.)	Qualification for Europa League first qualifying round
5	Sloboda Užice	30	15	6	9	42	35	+7	51	

Source: SuperLiga
Rules for classification: 1) points; 2) head-to-head points; 3) head-to-head goal difference; 4) head-to-head goals scored; 5) goal difference; 6) number of goals scored.
(C) Champions

==== Results and positions by round ====
Round	1	2	3	4	5	6	7	8	9	10	11	12	13	14	15	16	17	18	19	20	21	22	23	24	25	26	27	28	29	30
Ground	A	H	A	H	A	A	H	A	H	A	H	A	H	A	H	H	A	H	A	H	H	A	H	A	H	A	H	A	H	A
Result	L	W	W	W	W	W	D	W	W	D	W	W	L	W	L	W	W	W	W	W	W	D	W	D	W	D	W	W	W	L
Position	14	10	6	3	2	2	2	2	2	2	2	2	2	2	2	2	2	2	2	2	2	2	2	2	2	2	2	2	2	2

Updated to match(es) played on 20 May 2012. Source: superliga.rs
A = Away; H = Home; W = Win; D = Draw; L = Loss

==== Results ====
Kickoff times are in CET.

14 August 2011 Round 1	Spartak	2 – 0	Red Star	Subotica, Serbia
17:30	Torbica 26' (pen.); Bratić (yellow card) 47' (yellow-red card) 82' (goal) 55'; Milanković (yellow card) 57'; Puškarić (yellow card) 77'; Joksimović (yellow card) 84'; Simović (yellow card) 90+1'; Aleksić (yellow card) 90+5'	Report	Kovačević (yellow card) 23'; Vilotić (yellow card) 50'; Mijailović (red card) 65'; Tošić (yellow card) 66'	Stadium: Subotica City Stadium; Attendance: 11,000; Referee: Darko Bogdanović

21 August 2011 Round 2	Red Star	2 – 0	Javor	Belgrade, Serbia
19:00	Tošić 22'; Evandro 67'; Lazović (yellow card) 75'; Mezenga (yellow card) 80'	Report	Milovanović (yellow card) 56'; Salihović (yellow card) 78'	Stadium: Stadion Crvena Zvezda; Attendance: 10,531; Referee: Danilo Mihajlović

28 August 2011 Round 3	Smederevo	0 – 1	Red Star	Smederevo, Serbia
17:00	Kovačević (yellow card) 4'; Ognjanović (yellow card) 14'; Ćeran (yellow card) 63'	Report	Lazović 50'; Tošić (yellow card) 63'; Evandro (yellow card) 90'	Stadium: Fortress Stadium; Attendance: 8,000; Referee: Dejan Santrač

10 September 2011 Round 4	Red Star	2 – 0	BSK Borča	Belgrade, Serbia
18:30	Vilotić (yellow card) 41'; Cadú 51'; Mezenga 61'	Report	Bošković (yellow card) 38'; Đukić (yellow card) 42'; Ćesarević (yellow card) 66'; Milošević (yellow card) 82'	Stadium: Stadion Crvena Zvezda; Attendance: 9,708; Referee: Dejan Filipović

17 September 2011 Round 5	Borac	0 – 3	Red Star	Čačak, Serbia
16:30	Krasić (yellow card) 43'; Alves (yellow card) 58'; Dunjić (yellow card) 62'; Prodanović (yellow card) 73'	Report	Cadú 19' (pen.); Mikić 31'; Lazović 78'	Stadium: Čačak Stadium; Attendance: 5,200; Referee: Majo Vujović

25 September 2011 Round 6	Hajduk	0 – 1	Red Star	Kula, Serbia
16:00	Mujdragić (yellow card) 40'; Kovačević (yellow card) 45'; Novković (yellow card) 45'; Hadžibulić (yellow card) 46'; Ragipović (yellow card) 46'; Ćovin (yellow card) 56'; Osei (yellow card) 78'; Bubalo (yellow card) 88'	Report	Mikić (yellow card) 46'; Petković (yellow card) 46'; Cadú 56'; Vilotić (yellow card) 65'	Stadium: Stadion Hajduk; Attendance: 6,000; Referee: Danilo Grujić

1 October 2011 Round 7	Red Star	1 – 1	Radnički 1923	Belgrade, Serbia
18:00	Lazović 62'; Cadú (yellow card) 64'	Report	Živadinović 92'	Stadium: Stadion Crvena Zvezda; Attendance: 16,525; Referee: Miodrag Gogić

15 October 2011 Round 8	Metalac	0 – 5	Red Star	Gornji Milanovac, Serbia
14:30	Živković (yellow card) 48'; Lukić (yellow card) 62'; Simović (yellow card) 72'; Owusu-Ansah (yellow card) 73'	Report	Cadú 14', 64'; Borja (yellow card) 58' (goal) 80'; Kaluđerović 78'; Vešović 90'	Stadium: Stadion FK Metalac; Attendance: 2,500; Referee: Dejan Dimitrijević

22 October 2011 Round 9	Red Star	3 – 1	Novi Pazar	Belgrade, Serbia
18:00	Kaluđerović 5'; Evandro 18', 76'; Bajković (yellow card) 31'	Report	Petrović (yellow card) 25'; Bogunović 71'; Đogatović (yellow card) 81'; Stojanović (yellow card) 82'	Stadium: Stadion Crvena Zvezda; Attendance: 12,509; Referee: Novak Simović

29 October 2011 Round 10	Sloboda	1 – 1	Red Star	Užice, Serbia
14:00	Bossman (yellow card) 22'; Božović (yellow card) 43'; Kasalica 73'; Goločevac (yellow card) 77'; Vasilić (yellow card) 82'; Kovačević (yellow card) 90'	Report	Vešović (yellow card) 82'; Borja 87'	Stadium: Stadion FK Sloboda; Attendance: 10,000; Referee: Danilo Grujić

5 November 2011 Round 11	Red Star	3 – 1	OFK Beograd	Belgrade, Serbia
18:00	Kaluđerović 16', 17'; Borja 78' (yellow card) 90'	Report	Addy 19' (o.g.); Kecojević (yellow card) 75'; Gašić (yellow card) 80'	Stadium: Stadion Crvena Zvezda; Attendance: 13,260; Referee: Milenko Vukadinović

19 November 2011 Round 12	Jagodina	1 – 3	Red Star	Jagodina, Serbia
13:00	Stojanović (yellow card) 3'; Mudrinski 20'; Gogić (yellow card) 69'; Šimić (yellow card) 78'	Report	Kovačević (yellow card) 3'; Kaluđerović 25'; Vešović (yellow card) 35'; Dimitrijević (yellow card) 41'; Mikić 62'; Evandro 79' (pen.)	Stadium: Stadion FK Jagodina; Attendance: 9,000; Referee: Boško Jovanetić

26 November 2011 Round 13	Red Star	0 – 2	Partizan	Belgrade, Serbia
18:00	Evandro (yellow card) 44'; Addy (yellow card) 50'; Borja (yellow card) 59'; Mijailović (yellow card) 68'; Vešović (yellow card) 89'	Report	Vukić (yellow card) 40' (goal) 71'; Rnić (yellow card) 41'; Medo (yellow card) 64'; Ilić (yellow card) 73'; Šćepović 78'; Stojković (yellow card) 86'	Stadium: Stadion Crvena Zvezda; Attendance: 45,355; Referee: Danilo Grujić

4 December 2011 Round 14	Rad	1 – 2	Red Star	Belgrade, Serbia
13:00	Rogač 39' (yellow card) 66'; Leković (yellow card) 74'; Jovanović (yellow card) 81'; Andrić (yellow card) 86'	Report	Evandro 59'; Kaluđerović 90'	Stadium: Stadion FK Obilić; Attendance: 3,500; Referee: Dragan Krstić

10 December 2011 Round 15	Red Star	0 – 2	Vojvodina	Belgrade, Serbia
13:00	Addy (yellow card) 53'; Kovačević (yellow card) 60'; Vešović (yellow card) 78'; Mezenga (yellow card) 82'	Report	Branković (yellow card) 40'; Medojević (yellow card) 56'; Stevanović 66'; Vulićević (yellow card) 71'; Ljubinković 87'	Stadium: Stadion Crvena Zvezda; Attendance: 0 Referee: Boško Jovanetić

3 March 2012 Round 16	Red Star	1 – 0	Spartak	Belgrade, Serbia
17:00	Tošić (yellow card) 21'; Lazović (yellow card) 64'; Evandro 65'; Mijailović (yellow card) 90'	Report	Đurđević (yellow card) 16'; Čović (yellow card) 23'; Adamović (yellow card) 30'; Kovačević (yellow card) 32'	Stadium: Stadion Crvena Zvezda; Attendance: 41,250; Referee: Boško Jovanetić

10 March 2012 Round 17	Javor	1 – 3	Red Star	Ivanjica, Serbia
14:00	Odita 9' (yellow card) 42'; Jakimovski (yellow card) 17'; Veljović (yellow card) 41'; Vidić (yellow card) 43'; Vujadinović (yellow card) 72'	Report	Tošić (yellow card) 11'; Evandro 34' (yellow card) 69'; Milunović 39'; Mladenović 85'	Stadium: Ivanjica Stadium; Attendance: 4,000; Referee: Majo Vujović

14 March 2012 Round 18	Red Star	4 – 0	Smederevo	Belgrade, Serbia
18:30	Milunović 14'; Mikić (yellow card) 40'; Cadú 72' (pen.) 86' (pen.); Kasalica 76'; Stojković (yellow card) 87'	Report	Živković (yellow card) 13'; Stojanović (yellow card) 18'; Lukić (yellow card) 40'; Adamović (yellow card) 48'; Milosavljević (yellow card) 72'	Stadium: Stadion Crvena Zvezda; Attendance: 40,621; Referee: Danilo Mihajlović

17 March 2012 Round 19	BSK Borča	1 – 4	Red Star	Belgrade, Serbia
14:30	Vignjević 14'; Milošević (yellow card) 22'	Report	Cadú 12'; Maksimović (yellow card) 17'; Mijailović (yellow card) 55'; Lazović 68' 90'; Borja 70' (yellow card) 69'	Stadium: Stadion Poljana; Attendance: 3,500; Referee: Dejan Filipović

24 March 2012 Round 20	Red Star	2 – 0	Borac	Belgrade, Serbia
18:00	Vešović (yellow card) 28'; Evandro (yellow card) 48'; Kasalica (yellow card) 56'; Lazović 70'; Cadú (yellow card) 84' (goal) 89'	Report	Knežević (yellow card) 34'; Spirovski (yellow card) 81'	Stadium: Stadion Crvena Zvezda; Attendance: 26,234; Referee: Dejan Santrač

31 March 2012 Round 21	Red Star	3 – 0	Hajduk	Belgrade, Serbia
18:00	Borja 30' 81'; Mladenović 55'; Milivojević (yellow card) 87'	Report	Maksimović (yellow card) 17'; Goločevac (yellow card) 51'; Ćovin (yellow card) 81'	Stadium: Stadion Crvena Zvezda; Attendance: 22,803; Referee: Nenad Đokić

4 April 2012 Round 22	Radnički 1923	0 – 0	Red Star	Kragujevac, Serbia
18:00	Nedović (yellow card) 30'; I. Petrović (yellow card) 74'; Čančarević (yellow card) 77'; Lepović (yellow card) 80'	Report	Mijailović (yellow card) 12'; Mladenović (yellow card) 65'; Maksimović (yellow card) 80'; Tošić (yellow card) 90'	Stadium: Čika Dača Stadium; Attendance: 13,000; Referee: Majo Vujović

7 April 2012 Round 23	Red Star	5 – 0	Metalac	Belgrade, Serbia
18:00	Evandro 28'; Lazović 32'; Borja 50'; Cadú 59' (pen.); Milivojević 90'	Report	Owusu (yellow card) 18' (yellow-red card) 52'; Vujović (yellow card) 42'	Stadium: Stadion Crvena Zvezda; Attendance: 12,464; Referee: Novica Anđelovski

14 April 2012 Round 24	Novi Pazar	0 – 0	Red Star	Novi Pazar, Serbia
16:00	Šarac (yellow card) 26'; Ademović (yellow card) 27'; Babić (yellow card) 67'; Đogatović (yellow card) 70'; Škrijelj (yellow card) 83'; Bogunović (yellow card) 90'	Report	Mijailović (yellow card) 43'; Milivojević (yellow card) 73'; Mirić (yellow card) 73'; Đuričković (yellow card) 90'	Stadium: Gradski Stadion; Attendance: 12,000; Referee: Dejan Dimitrijević

21 April 2012 Round 25	Red Star	1 – 0	Sloboda	Belgrade, Serbia
18:00	Mijailović (yellow card) 73'; Mikić 82'	Report	Bossman (yellow card) 76'; Memedović (yellow card) 81'	Stadium: Stadion Crvena Zvezda; Attendance: 11,120; Referee: Aleksandar Vasić

25 April 2012 Round 26	OFK Beograd	1 – 1	Red Star	Belgrade, Serbia
16:30	Batioja 23'; Kecojević (yellow card) 77'	Report	Krneta (yellow card) 74'; Kasalica 85'	Stadium: Omladinski Stadium; Attendance: 1,500; Referee: Milenko Vukadinović

28 April 2012 Round 27	Red Star	1 – 0	Jagodina	Belgrade, Serbia
19:00	Dimitrijević 38'	Report	Mudrinski (yellow card) 10'	Stadium: Stadion Crvena Zvezda; Attendance: 8,350; Referee: Miodrag Gogić

5 May 2012 Round 28	Partizan	0 – 1	Red Star	Belgrade, Serbia
19:30		Report	Milivojević (yellow card) 58'; Borja (yellow card) 83'; Cadú 93'	Stadium: Partizan Stadium; Attendance: 22,000; Referee: Miodrag Gogić

12 May 2012 Round 29	Red Star	3 – 1	Rad	Belgrade, Serbia
19:00	Mirić 36'; Borja 81'; Milunović 86' (yellow card) 87'; Vešović (yellow card) 88'	Report	Perović 67'; Đurđević (yellow card) 88'; Kojić (yellow card) 88'; Mrkela (yellow card) 89'	Stadium: Stadion Crvena Zvezda; Attendance: 26,473; Referee: Dejan Santrač

20 May 2012 Round 30	Vojvodina	2 – 1	Red Star	Novi Sad, Serbia
15:00	Appiah 15'; Ajuru (yellow card) 47'; Mojsov (yellow card) 71'; Mitošević (yellow card) 90'; Oumarou 90'	Report	Milunović 11'; Tošić (yellow card) 25'; Cadú (yellow card) 74'	Stadium: Karađorđe Stadium; Attendance: 9,000; Referee: Svetislav Marušić

=== Serbian Cup ===
Red Star Belgrade participated in the 6th Serbian Cup starting in the Round of 32. They won competition beating Borac Čačak in final.

==== Round of 32 ====
21 September 2011 R32	Mladost Lučani	1 – 2	Red Star	Lučani, Serbia
15:30	Jeremić (yellow card) 40'; Milošević (yellow card) 53' (goal) 85'; Vasić (red card) 60'; Krznarić (yellow card) 81'	Report	Lazović (yellow card) 50'; Dimitrijević (yellow card) 72'; Kaluđerović 83'; Borja 91'	Stadium: Stadion Mladost; Attendance: 1,500; Referee: Milorad Mažić

==== Round of 16 ====
25 October 2011 R16	Red Star	1 – 0	Banat	Belgrade, Serbia
18:00	Kovačević (yellow card) 57'; Vesić (red card) 74'; Evandro 90+5' (pen.)	Report		Stadium: Stadion Crvena Zvezda; Attendance: 6,241; Referee: Srđan Obradović

==== Quarter-finals ====
23 November 2011 QF	Red Star	4 – 0	Smederevo	Belgrade, Serbia
18:00	Mezenga 30', 60'; Evandro 42'; Borja 77'; Kaluđerović (yellow card) 92'	Report	Krčmarević (yellow card) 13' (red card) 45'	Stadium: Stadion Crvena Zvezda; Attendance: 4,800; Referee: Majo Vujović

==== Semi finals ====
21 March 2012 SF	Red Star	2 – 0	Partizan	Belgrade, Serbia
19:00	Milunović 19'; Mijailović (yellow card) 63'; Kasalica 76'; Milivojević (yellow card) 78' (yellow-red card) 85'	Report	Marković (yellow card) 64'; Medo (yellow card) 78'	Stadium: Stadion FK Crvena zvezda Attendance: 48,736; Referee: Milorad Mažić

11 April 2012 SF	Partizan	0 – 2 (0 – 4 agg.)	Red Star	Belgrade, Serbia
19:30	Ivanov (yellow card) 44'	Report	Vešović (yellow card) 12'; Mladenović (yellow card) 49'; Lazović 63'; Evandro (yellow card) 79'; Borja 81'; Maksimović (yellow card) 89'	Stadium: Stadion FK Partizan; Attendance: 29,500; Referee: Milorad Mažić

==== Final ====
16 May 2012 F	Red Star	2 – 0	Borac Čačak	Kruševac, Serbia
20:00	Evandro 40'; Milivojević (yellow card) 63'; Borja 85' (yellow card) 85'	Report	Miličić (yellow card) 31'; Ignjatović (yellow card) 39'; Prodanović (yellow card) 54'	Stadium: Mladost stadium Attendance: 11,000; Referee: Milorad Mažić

=== UEFA Europa League ===
By finishing second in the 2010-11 Serbian SuperLiga, Red Star Belgrade qualified for the Europa League. They started in the third qualifying round against Latvian side Ventspils, and were eliminated in Play-off round by French side Stade Rennais.

==== Third qualifying round ====
28 July 2011 QR3	Ventspils (Latvia)	1 – 2	(Serbia) Red Star	Ventspils, Latvia
18:00	Kosmačovs (yellow card) 2'; Višņakovs 43'; Shibamura (yellow card) 50'; Tukura (yellow card) 68'	Report	Kaluđerović 10' (yellow card) 24'; Tošić (yellow card) 14'; Evandro (yellow card) 42'; Kovačević (yellow card) 55'; Cadú (yellow card) 87'; Mezenga 90+3'	Stadium: Ventspils Olimpiskais Stadions; Attendance: 3,000; Referee: Lars Christoffersen (Denmark)

4 August 2011 QR3	Red Star (Serbia)	7 – 0 (9 – 1 agg.)	(Latvia) Ventspils	Belgrade, Serbia
20:30	Martinez 13' (o.g.); Kaluđerović 23', 53'; Lazović 26'; Borja 41', 75'; Mezenga 60'; Mijailović (yellow card) 89'	Report	Kosmačovs (yellow card) 27'; Sukhanov (yellow card) 48'; Rugins (yellow card) 51' (yellow-red card) 52'; Laizāns (yellow card) 65'; Shibamura (yellow card) 74'	Stadium: Stadion Crvena Zvezda; Attendance: 39,862; Referee: Ruddy Buquet (France)

==== Play-off round ====
18 August 2011 Play-off	Red Star (Serbia)	1 – 2	(France) Stade Rennais	Belgrade
20:30	Cadú 17' (pen.); Evandro (yellow card) 58'; Ćosić (yellow card) 63'; Vilotić (yellow card) 78'	Report	Pitroipa 41'; Montaño 75' (yellow card) 76'	Stadium: Stadion Crvena Zvezda; Attendance: 54,000; Referee: Duarte Gomes (Portugal)

25 August 2011 Play-off	Stade Rennais (France)	4 – 0 (6 – 1 agg.)	(Serbia) Red Star	Rennes
18:30	Montaño 10' (yellow card) 61'; M'Vila 19' (pen.) (yellow card) 87'; Pajot 84'; Kembo Ekoko 90'	Report	Addy (yellow card) 19'; Cadú (yellow card) 81'	Stadium: Stade de la Route de Lorient; Attendance: 17,000; Referee: Deniz Aytekin (Germany)
