= 2012–13 Red Star Belgrade season =

Red Star Belgrade
2012–13 season
- President: (Serbia) Vladan Lukić (until 13 November) (Serbia) Dragan Džajić (from 13 November)
- Head coach: (Croatia) Robert Prosinečki (until 20 August) (Serbia) Aleksandar Janković (from 20 August until 18 March) (Portugal) Ricardo Sá Pinto (from 18 March)
- Stadium: Stadion Crvena Zvezda
- SuperLiga: 2nd
- Serbian Cup: Quarter-finals
- Europa League: Play-off round
- Top goalscorer: League: Ognjen Mudrinski (10); All: Ognjen Mudrinski (12)
- Highest home attendance: 44,155 (vs Partizan, 17 November 2012)
- Lowest home attendance: 7,398 (vs OFK Beograd, 21 November 2012)
- Average home league attendance: 19,202
| Home colours | Away colours | Third colours |

In season 2012–13 Red Star Belgrade will be competing in Serbian SuperLiga, Serbian Cup and UEFA Europa League.

== Previous season positions ==
The club competed in Serbian SuperLiga, Serbian Cup in domestic and UEFA Europa League in European competitions. Finishing 2nd in domestic league, behind Partizan, won Serbian Cup (beat Borac Čačak in final) and losing to 6th placed team from French championship Rennais in Play-off round for UEFA Europa League.

| | Competition | Position |
|---|---|---|
| (Serbia) | Serbian SuperLiga | 2nd |
| (Serbia) | Serbian Cup | Champions |
| (European Union) | UEFA Europa League | Play-off round |

== Kit ==
Red Star Belgrade players are wearing a kit made by Legea for the 2012–13 season. The home colors are of a typical Red-White design with small stripes. The Away and third kit colors are swapped. Also both away and third kit are based on Udinese Calcio Away kits.

== Players ==
=== Squad statistics ===
| Nation | No. | Player | SuperLiga | | Serbian Cup | | Europa League | | Total | | Discipline | |
| Nation | No. | Player | Apps. | | Apps. | | Apps. | | Apps. | | Yellow card | Red card |
|---|---|---|---|---|---|---|---|---|---|---|---|---|
Goalkeepers
| (Montenegro) ^{1} | 1 | Boban Bajković | 28 | 0 | 0 | 0 | 6 | 0 | 34 | 0 | 3 | 0 |
| (Serbia) | 22 | Miloš Vesić | 1 | 0 | 1 | 0 | 0 | 0 | 2 | 0 | 0 | 0 |
| (Serbia) | 32 | Aleksandar Kirovski | 2 | 0 | 3 | 0 | 0 | 0 | 5 | 0 | 2 | 1 |
Defenders
| (Serbia) | 2 | Aleksandar Pantić | 13 | 1 | 2 | 0 | 0 | 0 | 15 | 1 | 2 | 0 |
| (Serbia) | 3 | Nikola Petković | 11 | 0 | 0 | 0 | 0 | 0 | 11 | 0 | 2 | 1 |
| (Serbia) | 5 | Uroš Spajić | 16 | 0 | 1 | 0 | 1 | 0 | 18 | 0 | 1 | 0 |
| (Serbia) | 6 | Jovan Krneta | 1 | 0 | 0 | 0 | 2 | 0 | 3 | 0 | 2 | 0 |
| (Serbia) | 13 | Nikola Maksimović | 13 | 1 | 1 | 0 | 6 | 0 | 20 | 1 | 3 | 0 |
| (Serbia) | 14 | Nikola Mikić | 21 | 3 | 2 | 0 | 5 | 1 | 28 | 4 | 2 | 0 |
| (Montenegro) ^{1} | 15 | Milan Jovanović | 9 | 0 | 2 | 1 | 4 | 0 | 15 | 1 | 7 | 0 |
| (Montenegro) ^{1} | 23 | Stevan Reljić | 0 | 0 | 0 | 0 | 0 | 0 | 0 | 0 | 0 | 0 |
| (Serbia) | 25 | Filip Mladenović | 26 | 0 | 3 | 0 | 6 | 1 | 35 | 1 | 4 | 0 |
Midfielders
| (Serbia) | 4 | Srđan Mijailović | 18 | 0 | 2 | 0 | 5 | 0 | 25 | 0 | 4 | 0 |
| (Serbia) | 7 | Miloš Dimitrijević | 12 | 1 | 3 | 1 | 6 | 1 | 21 | 3 | 2 | 0 |
| (Serbia) | 8 | Darko Lazović | 23 | 4 | 2 | 1 | 6 | 0 | 31 | 5 | 2 | 0 |
| (Serbia) | 10 | Nenad Milijaš | 26 | 9 | 3 | 0 | 0 | 0 | 29 | 9 | 3 | 0 |
| (Brazil) | 11 | Cadú | 13 | 2 | 0 | 0 | 3 | 0 | 16 | 2 | 0 | 0 |
| (Serbia) | 19 | Luka Milivojević | 25 | 6 | 2 | 0 | 5 | 0 | 32 | 6 | 6 | 0 |
| (Honduras) | 20 | Luis Garrido | 10 | 0 | 0 | 0 | 0 | 0 | 10 | 0 | 0 | 0 |
| (Serbia) | 24 | Nikola Karaklajić | 1 | 0 | 0 | 0 | 0 | 0 | 1 | 0 | 0 | 0 |
| (Serbia) | 28 | Vukan Savićević | 10 | 1 | 2 | 0 | 1 | 1 | 13 | 2 | 0 | 0 |
| (Montenegro) ^{1} | 29 | Marko Vešović | 25 | 0 | 3 | 0 | 5 | 1 | 33 | 1 | 4 | 1 |
Forwards
| (Nigeria) | 9 | Abiola Dauda | 11 | 4 | 0 | 0 | 0 | 0 | 11 | 4 | 0 | 0 |
| (Serbia) | 16 | Luka Milunović | 27 | 6 | 2 | 1 | 6 | 2 | 34 | 9 | 2 | 0 |
| (Montenegro) ^{1} | 17 | Filip Kasalica | 24 | 4 | 3 | 0 | 5 | 3 | 32 | 7 | 11 | 0 |
| (Serbia) | 18 | Ognjen Ožegović | 4 | 0 | 0 | 0 | 0 | 0 | 4 | 0 | 0 | 0 |
| (Serbia) | 27 | Stefan Mihajlović | 3 | 0 | 0 | 0 | 0 | 0 | 3 | 0 | 0 | 0 |
| (Ghana) | 77 | Nathaniel Asamoah | 11 | 1 | 1 | 0 | 2 | 0 | 14 | 1 | 0 | 0 |
| (Serbia) | 91 | Ognjen Mudrinski | 23 | 11 | 2 | 1 | 0 | 0 | 25 | 12 | 0 | 0 |
Players sold or loaned out during the season
| (Brazil) ^{1} | MF | Evandro Goebel | 1 | 0 | 0 | 0 | 4 | 0 | 5 | 0 | 1 | 0 |
| (Serbia) | MF | Marko Mirić | 2 | 0 | 0 | 0 | 3 | 0 | 5 | 0 | 0 | 0 |
| (Australia) ^{1} | FW | Eli Babalj | 6 | 1 | 1 | 0 | 1 | 0 | 8 | 1 | 0 | 0 |
Updated 26 May 2013

1 These players also hold Serbian citizenship.

=== Top scorers ===
Includes all competitive matches. The list is sorted by shirt number when total goals are equal.

| Position | Nation | Name | League | Cup | Europe | Total |
|---|---|---|---|---|---|---|
| 1 | (Serbia) | Ognjen Mudrinski | 10 | 1 | 0 | 11 |
| 2 | (Serbia) | Luka Milunović | 4 | 1 | 2 | 7 |
| 2 | (Montenegro) | Filip Kasalica | 4 | 0 | 3 | 7 |
| 4 | (Serbia) | Luka Milivojević | 6 | 0 | 0 | 6 |
| 5 | (Serbia) | Nenad Milijaš | 4 | 0 | 0 | 4 |
| 6 | (Serbia) | Miloš Dimitrijević | 1 | 1 | 1 | 3 |
| 6 | (Serbia) | Darko Lazović | 2 | 1 | 0 | 3 |
| 6 | (Serbia) | Nikola Mikić | 2 | 0 | 1 | 3 |
| 9 | (Serbia) | Aleksandar Pantić | 1 | 0 | 0 | 1 |
| 9 | (Australia) | Eli Babalj | 1 | 0 | 0 | 1 |
| 9 | (Serbia) | Nikola Maksimović | 1 | 0 | 0 | 1 |
| 9 | (Montenegro) | Milan Jovanović | 0 | 1 | 0 | 1 |
| 9 | (Serbia) | Filip Mladenović | 0 | 0 | 1 | 1 |
| 9 | (Serbia) | Vukan Savićević | 1 | 0 | 0 | 1 |
| 9 | (Montenegro) | Marko Vešović | 0 | 0 | 1 | 1 |
| 9 | (Ghana) | Nathaniel Asamoah | 1 | 0 | 0 | 1 |

Updated 17 March 2013

=== Player transfer ===
==== In ====
| No. | Pos. | Player | Moving from | Fee | Transfer Window |
|---|---|---|---|---|---|
| – | DF | (Montenegro) Stevan Reljić | (Serbia) Borac Čačak | Loan return | Summer |
| – | MF | (Serbia) Vladan Binić | (Serbia) Spartak Subotica | Loan return | Summer |
| 33 | DF | (Serbia) Ljubo Nenadić | (Serbia) Radnički 1923 | 16.5K | Summer |
| 34 | MF | (Serbia) Stevan Luković | (Serbia) Sopot | Free | Summer |
| 5 | DF | (Serbia) Uroš Spajić | (Serbia) Sopot | Loan return | Summer |
| 9 | FW | (Australia) Eli Babalj | (Australia) Melbourne Heart | 435.67K | Summer |
| 15 | DF | (Montenegro) Milan Jovanović | (Russia) Spartak Nalchik | Free | Summer |
| 91 | FW | (Serbia) Ognjen Mudrinski | (Serbia) Jagodina | Free | Summer |
| 10 | MF | (Serbia) Nenad Milijaš | (England) Wolverhampton Wanderers | Free | Summer |
| 2 | DF | (Serbia) Aleksandar Pantić | (Serbia) Rad | Undisclosed | Summer |
| – | DF | (Serbia) Filip Stojković | (Serbia) Banat Zrenjanin | Loan return | Winter |
| 18 | FW | (Serbia) Ognjen Ožegović | (Serbia) Banat Zrenjanin | Loan return | Winter |
| – | MF | (Serbia) Stevan Luković | (Serbia) Kolubara | Loan return | Winter |
| 24 | MF | (Serbia) Nikola Karaklajić | Promoted from youth squad | Free | Winter |
| 27 | FW | (Serbia) Stefan Mihajlović | Promoted from youth squad | Free | Winter |
| 20 | DF | (Honduras) Luis Garrido | (Honduras) Olimpia | Loan | Winter |
| 3 | DF | (Serbia) Nikola Petković | (Israel) Hapoel Tel Aviv | Free | Winter |
| 9 | FW | (Nigeria) Abiola Dauda | (Sweden) Kalmar FF | Free | Winter |

Total Expenditure: ▼452.17K €

==== Out ====
| Pos. | Player | Moving to | Fee | Transfer Window |
|---|---|---|---|---|
| DF | (Serbia) Milan Vilotić | (Switzerland) Grasshopper | Free | Summer |
| DF | (Serbia) Uroš Ćosić | (Russia) CSKA Moscow | Loan return | Summer |
| DF | (Serbia) Bojan Đorđević | (Serbia) Radnički Niš | Free | Summer |
| MF | (Brazil) Vinícius Pacheco | (Brazil) Náutico | Free | Summer |
| FW | (Colombia) Cristian Borja | (Brazil) Caxias do Sul | Loan return | Summer |
| DF | (Serbia) Nikola Petković | (Israel) Hapoel Tel Aviv | Free | Summer |
| DF | (Serbia) Dragoljub Srnić | (Serbia) Čukarički | Loan | Summer |
| MF | (Serbia) Slavoljub Srnić | (Serbia) Čukarički | Loan | Summer |
| DF | (Serbia) Duško Tošić | (Turkey) Gençlerbirliği | 600K | Summer |
| MF | (Serbia) Petar Đuričković | (Serbia) Radnički 1923 | Loan | Summer |
| FW | (Serbia) Ognjen Ožegović | (Serbia) Banat Zrenjanin | Loan | Summer |
| MF | (Serbia) Vladan Binić | (Serbia) Radnički Niš | Free | Summer |
| MF | (Brazil) Evandro Goebel | (Portugal) Estoril | Free | Summer |
| DF | (Serbia) Filip Stojković | (Serbia) Banat Zrenjanin | Loan | Summer |
| MF | (Serbia) Stevan Luković | (Serbia) Kolubara | Loan | Summer |
| DF | (Serbia) Danijel Mihajlović | (Serbia) Jagodina | Free | Summer |
| MF | (Serbia) Marko Perović | (Iran) Persepolis | Free | Winter |
| GK | (Serbia) Rastko Šuljagić | (Germany) Stuttgart | 100K | Winter |
| GK | (Serbia) Marko Dmitrović | (Serbia) OFK Beograd | Free | Winter |
| DF | (Serbia) Filip Stojković | (Serbia) Čukarički | Loan | Winter |
| MF | (Serbia) Stevan Luković | (Bosnia and Herzegovina) Leotar | Loan | Winter |
| MF | (Serbia) Marko Mirić | (Serbia) Radnički 1923 | Loan | Winter |
| FW | (Australia) Eli Babalj | (Australia) Melbourne Heart | Free | Winter |
| DF | (Serbia) Ljubo Nenadić | (Serbia) Novi Pazar | Free | Winter |
| MF | (Serbia) Veljko Simić | (Switzerland) FC Basel | 240K | Winter |
| MF | (Serbia) Filip Janković | Released | Free | Winter |

Total Income: ▲940K €

== Competitions ==
=== Serbian SuperLiga ===
Red Star Belgrade will compete with 15 other teams in the Serbian SuperLiga.

==== League table ====
| Pos | Team | Pld | W | D | L | GF | GA | GD | Pts | Qualification or relegation |
|---|---|---|---|---|---|---|---|---|---|---|
| 1 | Partizan (C) | 30 | 23 | 4 | 3 | 71 | 16 | +55 | 73 | Qualification for Champions League second qualifying round |
| 2 | Red Star Belgrade | 30 | 20 | 2 | 8 | 55 | 35 | +20 | 62 | Qualification for Europa League second qualifying round |
| 3 | Vojvodina | 30 | 17 | 10 | 3 | 40 | 20 | +20 | 61 | Qualification for Europa League first qualifying round |
| 4 | Jagodina | 30 | 15 | 5 | 10 | 35 | 26 | +9 | 50 | Qualification for Europa League second qualifying round |
| 5 | Sloboda Užice | 30 | 11 | 12 | 7 | 39 | 37 | +2 | 45 | |

Source: Serbian SuperLiga
Rules for classification: 1) points; 2) head-to-head points; 3) head-to-head goal difference; 4) head-to-head goals scored; 5) goal difference; 6) number of goals scored.
(C) Champions

==== Results and positions by round ====
| Round | 1 | 2 | 3 | 4 | 5 | 6 | 7 | 8 | 9 | 10 | 11 | 12 | 13 | 14 | 15 | 16 | 17 | 18 | 19 | 20 | 21 | 22 | 23 | 24 | 25 | 26 | 27 | 28 | 29 | 30 |
|---|---|---|---|---|---|---|---|---|---|---|---|---|---|---|---|---|---|---|---|---|---|---|---|---|---|---|---|---|---|---|
| Ground | A | H | A | H | A | A | H | A | H | A | H | A | H | A | H | H | A | H | A | H | H | A | H | A | H | A | H | A | H | A |
| Result | W | D | W | W | W | W | W | L | W | W | L | L | W | W | L | W | D | W | L | W | W | W | W | W | W | W | W | L | L | L |
| Position | 10 | 11 | 8 | 5 | 4 | 3 | 3 | 2 | 2 | 2 | 2 | 2 | 2 | 2 | 2 | 2 | 2 | 2 | 2 | 2 | 2 | 2 | 2 | 2 | 2 | 2 | 2 | 2 | 2 | 2 |

Updated to match(es) played on 26 May 2013. Source: superliga.rs
A = Away; H = Home; W = Win; D = Draw; L = Loss

==== Matches ====
| Date | Round | Opponents | Ground | Result | Scorers |
|---|---|---|---|---|---|
| 3 October 2012 | 1 | Javor | A | 1–2 | Mudrinski 54' Lazović 80' |
| 19 August 2012 | 2 | Rad | H | 2–2 | L.Milivojević 51' Lazović 73' |
| 26 August 2012 | 3 | Novi Pazar | A | 1–2 | Kasalica 38' L.Milunović 51' |
| 2 September 2012 | 4 | Radnički Niš | H | 3–2 | Mudrinski 12' 65' 90+5' |
| 16 September 2012 | 5 | Radnički 1923 | A | 0–3 | Milijaš 43' Kasalica 82' L.Milivojević 90' |
| 22 September 2012 | 6 | Hajduk Kula | A | 0–1 | Mudrinski 15' |
| 29 September 2012 | 7 | Smederevo | H | 3–1 | L.Milunović 17' Mikić 45' Babalj 88' |
| 7 October 2012 | 8 | Spartak | A | 3–0 | |
| 20 October 2012 | 9 | BSK Borča | H | 7–2 | Dimitrijević 2' Mikić 5' Mudrinski 37' L.Milunović 40' Asamoah 69' Pantić 81' Maksimović 90' |
| 27 October 2012 | 10 | Donji Srem | A | 1–2 | L.Milivojević 25' 72' |
| 3 November 2012 | 11 | Jagodina | H | 1–2 | Mudrinski 46' |
| 11 November 2012 | 12 | OFK Beograd | A | 1–0 | |
| 17 November 2012 | 13 | Partizan | H | 3–2 | Kasalica 15' L.Milivojević 49' Milijaš 74' |
| 25 November 2012 | 14 | Sloboda Užice | A | 1–2 | Mudrinski 85' 90' |
| 1 December 2012 | 15 | Vojvodina | H | 0–3 | |
| 27 February 2013 | 16 | Javor | H | 2–1 | Savićević 58' L.Milunović 62' |
| 3 March 2013 | 17 | Rad | A | 1–1 | Milijaš 45' |
| 7 March 2013 | 18 | Novi Pazar | H | 3–0 | L.Milivojević 32' Mudrinski 34' Milijaš 81' |
| 17 March 2013 | 19 | Radnički Niš | A | 2–1 | Kasalica 78' |
| 30 March 2013 | 20 | Radnički 1923 | H | 2–0 | Cadú 45' Milijaš 69' |
| 3 April 2013 | 21 | Hajduk Kula | H | 3–0 | A.Dauda 13' 49' Lazović 55' |
| 7 April 2013 | 22 | Smederevo | A | 0–1 | A.Dauda 89' |
| 13 April 2013 | 23 | Spartak | H | 4–1 | Milijaš 20' 35' 58' Lazović 55' |
| 21 April 2013 | 24 | BSK Borča | A | 0–1 | L.Milunović 71' |
| 27 April 2013 | 25 | Donji Srem | H | 1–0 | Mikić 57' |
| 2 May 2013 | 26 | Jagodina | A | 3–2 | Cadú 4' A.Dauda 25' L.Milunović 52' |
| 11 May 2013 | 27 | OFK Beograd | H | 1–0 | Milijaš 67' |
| 18 May 2013 | 28 | Partizan | A | 0–1 | |
| 22 May 2013 | 29 | Sloboda Užice | H | 1–2 | Mudrinski 83' |
| 26 May 2013 | 30 | Vojvodina | A | 0–3 | |

=== Serbian Cup ===
Red Star Belgrade will participate in the 7th Serbian Cup starting in the Round of 32.

==== First round ====
| 26 September 2012 R32 | Radnički Niš | 1 – 2 | Red Star | Niš, Serbia |
| 16:00 | Petrović (yellow card) 59'; Ranđelović 77'; Kolarević (yellow card) 83' | Report | Milunović 37'; Jovanović (yellow card) 79' (goal) 89' | Stadium: Čair Stadium; Attendance: 12,000; Referee: Vlado Glođović |

==== Last 16 ====
| 24 October 2012 R16 | Hajduk Kula | 0 – 2 | Red Star | Kula, Serbia |
| 14:00 | Lalić (yellow card) 15'; Bulatović (yellow card) 26'; Cvetković (yellow card) 45'; Obrovac (yellow card) 67'; Kovačević (yellow card) 86' | Report | Kirovski (yellow card) 9' (yellow-red card) 49'; Jovanović (yellow card) 38'; Mudrinski 41'; Dimitrijević 45' (pen.) | Stadium: Stadion Hajduk; Attendance: 1,000; Referee: Majo Vujović |

==== Quarter-final ====
| 21 November 2012 QF | Red Star | 1 – 3 | OFK Beograd | Belgrade, Serbia |
| 16:00 | Lazović 30'; Kasalica (yellow card) 76' | Report | Grbić 12', 61'; Čavrić (yellow card) 55'; Bogavac 63'; Pavlovski (yellow card) 79'; Brkić (yellow card) 90' | Stadium: Stadion Crvena Zvezda; Attendance: 7,398; Referee: Milenko Vukadinović |

=== UEFA Europa League ===
By winning 2011–12 Serbian Cup, Red Star Belgrade qualified for the Europa League. They started in the second qualifying round against Belarus side Naftan Novopolotsk, and were eliminated in Play-off round by French side Bordeaux.

==== Second qualifying round ====
| 19 July 2012 QR2 | Naftan Novopolotsk (Belarus) | 3 – 4 | (Serbia) Red Star | Vitebsk, Belarus |
| 17:00 | Bukatkin (yellow card) 40'; Hawrushka 47' (pen.), 67'; Harbachow (yellow card) 49'; Zhukowski 76' (yellow card) 94'; Sorokin (yellow card) 85'; Berezovskyi (yellow card) 86' | Report | Kasalica 9', 69' (yellow card) 93'; Milunović 18', 34'; Maksimović (yellow card) 47'; Mladenović (yellow card) 65'; Dimitrijević (yellow card) 92' | Stadium: Central Sport Complex; Attendance: 5,350; Referee: Tony Asumaa (Finland) |

| 26 July 2012 QR2 | Red Star (Serbia) | 3 – 3 (7 – 6 agg.) | (Belarus) Naftan Novopolotsk | Belgrade, Serbia |
| 20:30 | Kasalica 9'; Dimitrijević 15'; Milivojević (yellow card) 36'; Krneta (yellow card) 61'; Vešović 91' | Report | Sorokin 21'; Bukatkin (yellow card) 48' (yellow-red card) 68'; Naumov 58'; Zyulev (yellow card) 70'; Kovalenko 82' | Stadium: Stadion Crvena Zvezda; Attendance: 27,628; Referee: Saïd Ennjimi (France) |

==== Third qualifying round ====
| 2 August 2012 QR3 | Red Star (Serbia) | 0 – 0 | (Cyprus) Omonia | Belgrade, Serbia |
| 20:30 | Kasalica (yellow card) 58'; Vešović (yellow card) 82' (yellow-red card) 93' | Report | Pavićević (yellow card) 67'; Aguiar (yellow card) 88'; Christofi (yellow card) 91'; Marco (yellow card) 92' | Stadium: Stadion Crvena Zvezda; Attendance: 26,960; Referee: Rene Eisner (Austria) |

| 9 August 2012 QR3 | Omonia (Cyprus) | 0 – 0 (a.e.t.) (5 – 6 p) | (Serbia) Red Star | Nicosia, Cyprus |
| 18:00 | Scaramozzino (yellow card) 25'; Freddy (yellow card) 44'; Spungin (yellow card) 110' | Report | Jovanović (yellow card) 17'; Milivojević (yellow card) 26'; Mijailović (yellow card) 33'; Mikić (yellow card) 45'; Lazović (yellow card) 52'; Kasalica (yellow card) 77' | Stadium: GSP Stadium; Attendance: 13,312; Referee: Michael Lerjéus (Sweden) |
| | Penalties |
| | Alves (penalty scored); Freddy (penalty scored); Pavićević (penalty missed); Christofi (penalty scored); Aguiar (penalty scored); Scaramozzino (penalty scored); Danielson (penalty missed) | | Dimitrijević (penalty scored); Milivojević (penalty scored); Kasalica (penalty missed); Maksimović (penalty scored); Milunović (penalty scored); Mladenović (penalty scored); Mijailović (penalty scored) |

==== Play-off round ====
| 23 August 2012 Play-off | Red Star (Serbia) | 0 – 0 | (France) Bordeaux | Belgrade, Serbia |
| 21:00 | Jovanović (yellow card) 22'; Milivojević (yellow card) 55' | Report | Sané (yellow card) 67' | Stadium: Stadion Crvena Zvezda; Attendance: 39,482; Referee: Alberto Undiano Mallenco (Spain) |

| 30 August 2012 Play-off | Bordeaux (France) | 3 – 2 (3 – 2 agg.) | (Serbia) Red Star | Bordeaux, France |
| 20:30 | Gouffran (yellow card) 31' (goal) 53', 93' (pen.); Maurice-Belay (yellow card) 41' (yellow-red card) 64'; Jussiê 71'; Sertic (yellow card) 81' | Report | Mladenović 45' (yellow card) 51'; Kasalica (yellow card) 67'; Jovanović (yellow card) 75'; Mikić 90' (yellow card) 91'; Bajković (yellow card) 92' | Stadium: Stade Chaban-Delmas; Attendance: 21,789; Referee: Mark Clattenburg (England) |
