= Ivan Milosavljević =

Ivan Milosavljević may refer to:

- Ivan Milosavljević (footballer, born 1983)
- Ivan Milosavljević (footballer, born 2000)
