= Luka Milivojević =

Serbian footballer (born 1991)

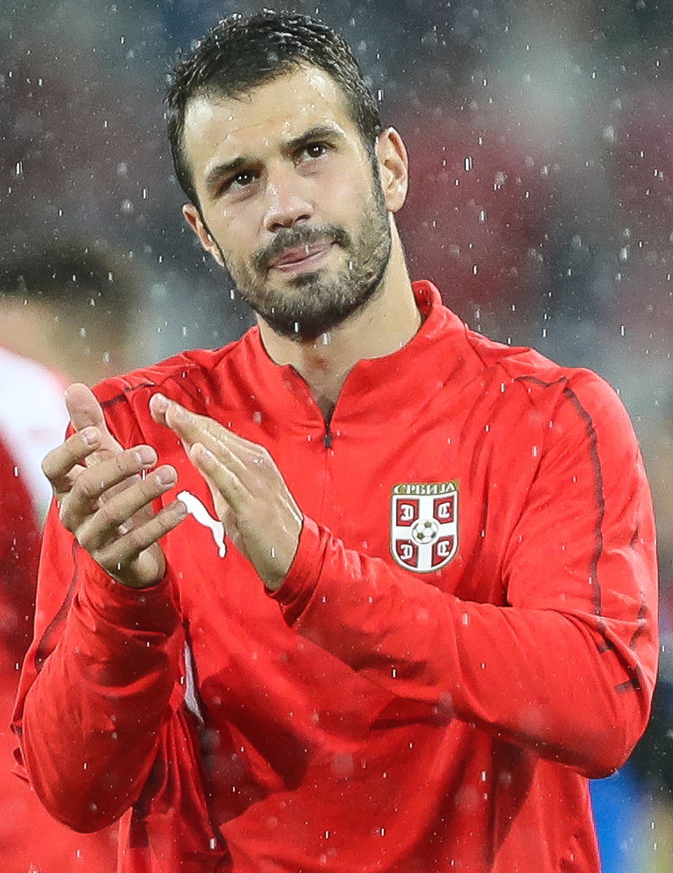
- Milivojević with Serbia at the 2018 World Cup

Personal information
- Full name: Luka Milivojević
- Date of birth: 7 April 1991 (age 35)
- Place of birth: Kragujevac, SR Serbia, Yugoslavia
- Height: 1.86 m (6 ft 1 in)
- Position: Midfielder

Team information
- Current team: Al-Nasr
- Number: 19

Senior career*
| Years | Team | Apps | (Gls) |
| 2007–2008 | Radnički Kragujevac | 5 | (1) |
| 2008–2012 | Rad | 49 | (3) |
| 2012–2013 | Red Star Belgrade | 36 | (7) |
| 2013–2014 | Anderlecht | 19 | (0) |
| 2014–2017 | Olympiacos | 62 | (11) |
| 2017–2023 | Crystal Palace | 183 | (28) |
| 2023–2025 | Shabab Al Ahli | 41 | (4) |
| 2025– | Al-Nasr | 25 | (5) |

International career
| 2011–2012 | Serbia U21 | 11 | (1) |
| 2012–2020 | Serbia | 38 | (1) |
- * Club domestic league appearances and goals as of 22:02, 21 November 2026 (UTC)

Luka Milivojević (Serbian Cyrillic: Лука Миливојевић, pronounced [lûːka miliʋǒːjeʋitɕ]; born 7 April 1991) is a Serbian professional footballer who plays as a midfielder for Al-Nasr.

Milivojević began his career with Radnički Kragujevac and then played for Rad before signing for Red Star Belgrade in January 2012. He later won the Belgian Pro League with Anderlecht and the Super League Greece twice with Olympiacos before a €16 million transfer to Premier League club Crystal Palace in January 2017. Appointed club captain in 2018, he amassed nearly 200 appearances and scored 29 goals for the club before departing in 2023.

Previously an under-21 international, Milivojević made his senior debut for Serbia in 2012 and represented his country at the 2018 FIFA World Cup. He earned a total of 38 caps, scoring 1 goal. He retired from international football in 2020.

== Club career ==
=== Early years ===
Milivojević's first season as senior was with his home town club Radnički Kragujevac during the 2007–08 season, then playing in the Serbian League West. At the end of that season he moved to the top league club Rad entered into the senior team in the 2008–09 season. He played as right side midfielder.

=== Red Star Belgrade ===
Milivojević signed for Red Star Belgrade on 19 December 2011. His arrival to Red Star was largely due to the desire of coach Robert Prosinečki, who believed that Milivojević had bright potential. On 17 November 2012, Milivojević scored an impressive goal against city rivals Partizan.

=== Anderlecht ===
On 26 July 2013, Milivojević signed a five-year contract with Belgian football giants Anderlecht. On 1 September 2014, it was announced that Milivojević had joined Olympiacos on loan from Anderlecht.

After the 2014–15 season, Milivojević reiterated his desire to stay with Olympiacos. The two clubs could have started new negotiations after the season ended; Milivojević stated that his wish was to make the move permanent. According to reports in Belgium, Olympiacos were to meet Anderlecht's asking price in order to complete the permanent transfer of Milivojević. Olympiacos were in negotiations with the Belgian club as they were reluctant to pay the €2.7 million Anderlecht asked for Milivojević.

=== Olympiacos ===
On 4 June 2015, Anderlecht confirmed that it had reached an agreement with Olympiacos for the permanent transfer of Milivojević. He had spent a season with the club, and joined the Greek champions by signing a four-year contract, for a fee of €2.3 million. On 30 June 2015, Olympiacos turned down a bid in the region of €5 million from Fenerbahçe.

=== Crystal Palace ===
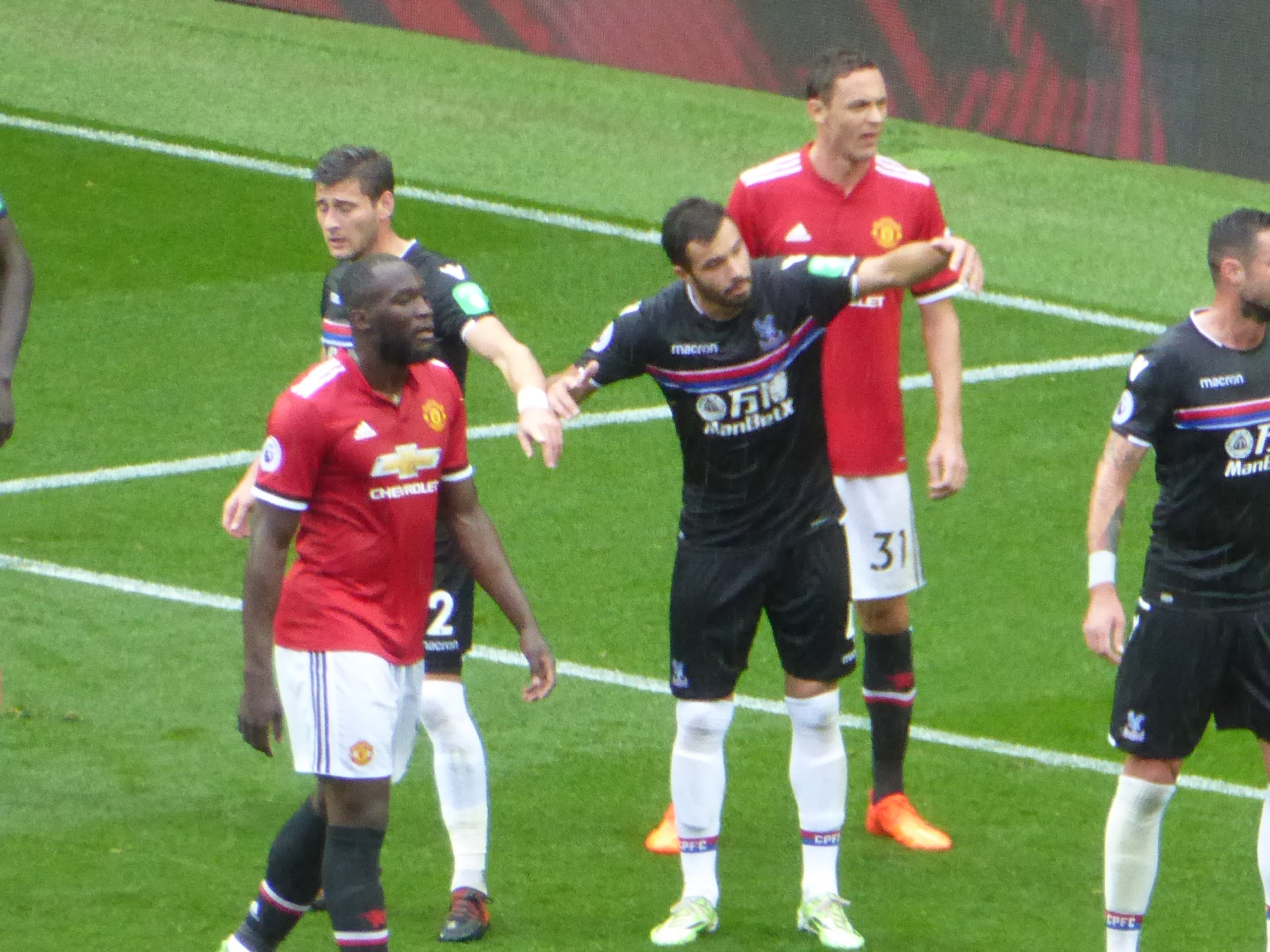
Milivojević in action against Manchester United

On 31 January 2017, Milivojević signed for Crystal Palace on a three-and-a-half-year contract for €16 million. On 10 April 2017, he scored his first goal for Palace with a penalty kick in his team's 3–0 home win over Arsenal, and got his other goal of the season on 14 May in a 4–0 win at Selhurst Park against Hull City, which secured his team's place in the top flight for next season and relegated the opponents.

In 2017–18, Milivojević was Palace's top scorer with 10 goals as the Eagles recovered from a poor start to the season to finish 11th under new manager Roy Hodgson. He developed a reputation for taking penalties, scoring nine of the ten he took in his first 1 1/2 seasons with Palace; he had never taken a penalty in a professional match prior to joining Crystal Palace. The one he did miss was on 31 December 2017 in added time at the end of a goalless draw against Manchester City, with Ederson making a save for the team who had won their last 18 matches.

On 28 October 2018, Milivojević scored two penalties in a 2–2 home draw with Arsenal, ending the visitors' run of 12 consecutive victories. Away to Manchester City on 22 December, he scored the winning goal from the penalty spot in a 3–2 victory over the title holders.

In August 2019, Milivojević signed a contract extension with Crystal Palace keeping him at the club until 2023.

On 24 May 2023, Crystal Palace announced that he would leave the club upon the expiry of his contract.

=== Shabab Al-Ahli ===
On 8 August 2023, Milivojević joined Emirati club Shabab Al Ahli.

=== Al-Nasr ===
On 12 July 2025, Milivojević joined Emirati club Al-Nasr.

== International career ==
He was a member of the Serbia u21 team. He was called-up in the Serbia national team on 29 September 2011, to face Italy and Slovenia in the UEFA Euro 2012 qualifying phase. He made his debut for Serbia on 14 November 2012 for a friendly match with Chile. On 6 October 2017 he scored his first goal for Serbia in a World Cup Qualifying match with Austria.

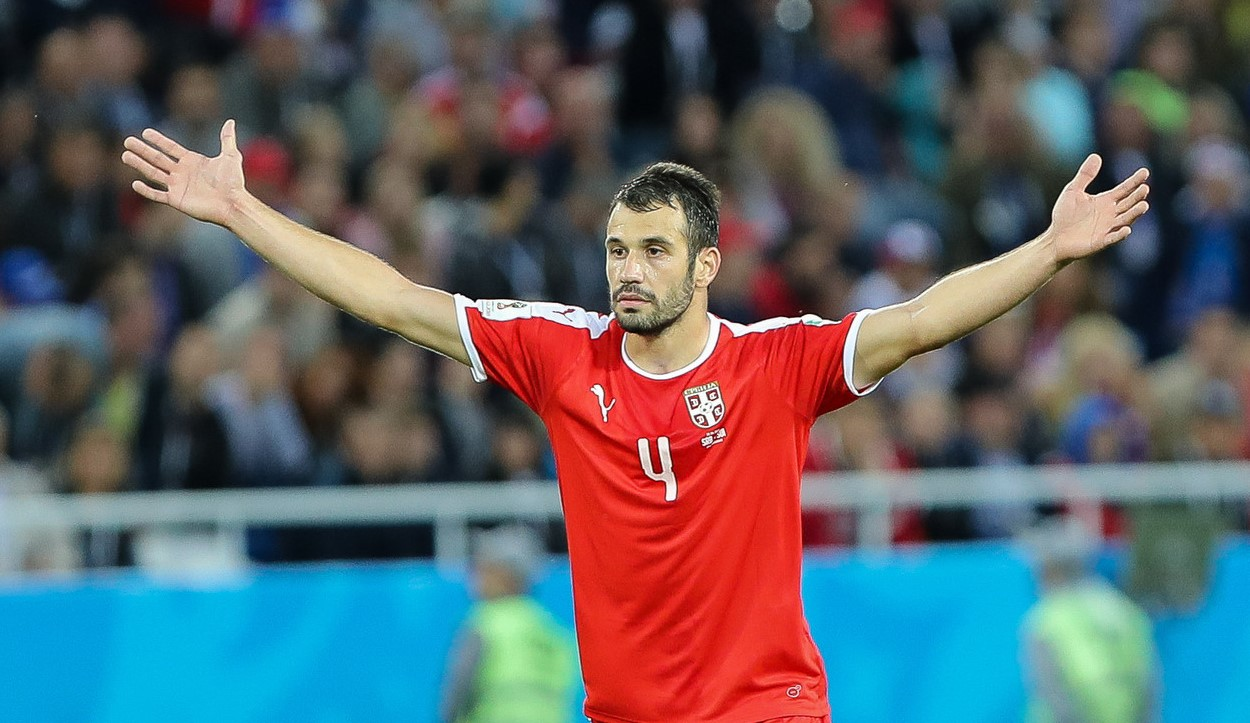
Milivojević with Serbia at the 2018 FIFA World Cup

In June 2018, he was included in the final 23-man squad for the 2018 FIFA World Cup. There he appeared in two matches, against Costa Rica and Switzerland.

In March 2021, he retired from international duty at the age of 29. His last match had been an October 2020 UEFA Nations League match against Hungary.

== Career statistics ==
=== Club ===
As of match played 25 May 2025

Appearances and goals by club, season and competition
| Club | Season | League | | | National cup (Note: Includes Serbian Cup, Belgian Cup, Greek Cup, FA Cup) | | League cup (Note: Includes EFL Cup) | | Continental | | Other | | Total | |
| Club | Season | Division | Apps | Goals | Apps | Goals | Apps | Goals | Apps | Goals | Apps | Goals | Apps | Goals |
|---|---|---|---|---|---|---|---|---|---|---|---|---|---|---|
| Radnički Kragujevac | 2007–08 | Serbian League West | 5 | 1 | 0 | 0 | — | | — | | — | | 5 | 1 |
| Rad | 2008–09 | Serbian SuperLiga | 1 | 0 | 0 | 0 | — | | — | | — | | 1 | 0 |
| Rad | 2009–10 | Serbian SuperLiga | 9 | 0 | 0 | 0 | — | | — | | — | | 9 | 0 |
| Rad | 2010–11 | Serbian SuperLiga | 26 | 0 | 0 | 0 | — | | — | | — | | 26 | 0 |
| Rad | 2011–12 | Serbian SuperLiga | 13 | 3 | 1 | 0 | — | | 4 (Note: Appearance(s) in UEFA Europa League) | 0 | — | | 18 | 3 |
| Rad | Total | | 49 | 3 | 1 | 0 | — | | 4 | 0 | — | | 54 | 3 |
| Red Star Belgrade | 2011–12 | Serbian SuperLiga | 11 | 1 | 3 | 0 | — | | — | | — | | 14 | 2 |
| Red Star Belgrade | 2012–13 | Serbian SuperLiga | 25 | 6 | 2 | 0 | — | | 5 | 0 | — | | 32 | 6 |
| Red Star Belgrade | 2013–14 | Serbian SuperLiga | 0 | 0 | 0 | 0 | — | | 1 | 0 | — | | 1 | 0 |
| Red Star Belgrade | Total | | 36 | 7 | 5 | 0 | — | | 6 | 0 | — | | 47 | 7 |
| Anderlecht | 2013–14 | Belgian Pro League | 16 | 0 | 1 | 0 | — | | 4 (Note: Appearances in UEFA Champions League) | 0 | 0 | 0 | 21 | 0 |
| Anderlecht | 2014–15 | Belgian Pro League | 3 | 0 | 0 | 0 | — | | 0 | 0 | 1 (Note: Appearance in Belgian Super Cup) | 0 | 4 | 0 |
| Anderlecht | Total | | 19 | 0 | 1 | 0 | — | | 4 | 0 | 1 | 0 | 25 | 0 |
| Olympiacos | 2014–15 | Super League Greece | 23 | 2 | 7 | 4 | — | | 7 (Note: Five appearances in UEFA Champions League, two appearances in UEFA Europa League) | 0 | — | | 37 | 6 |
| Olympiacos | 2015–16 | Super League Greece | 22 | 3 | 3 | 0 | — | | 6 (Note: Four appearances in UEFA Champions League, two appearances in UEFA Europa League) | 0 | — | | 31 | 3 |
| Olympiacos | 2016–17 | Super League Greece | 17 | 6 | 1 | 0 | — | | 8 (Note: Two appearances in UEFA Champions League, six appearances in UEFA Europa League) | 0 | — | | 26 | 6 |
| Olympiacos | Total | | 62 | 11 | 11 | 4 | — | | 21 | 0 | — | | 94 | 15 |
| Crystal Palace | 2016–17 | Premier League | 14 | 2 | 0 | 0 | — | | — | | — | | 14 | 2 |
| Crystal Palace | 2017–18 | Premier League | 36 | 10 | 0 | 0 | 1 | 0 | — | | — | | 37 | 10 |
| Crystal Palace | 2018–19 | Premier League | 38 | 12 | 3 | 0 | 1 | 0 | — | | — | | 42 | 12 |
| Crystal Palace | 2019–20 | Premier League | 31 | 3 | 1 | 0 | 0 | 0 | — | | — | | 32 | 3 |
| Crystal Palace | 2020–21 | Premier League | 31 | 1 | 0 | 0 | 1 | 0 | — | | — | | 32 | 1 |
| Crystal Palace | 2021–22 | Premier League | 15 | 0 | 5 | 0 | 0 | 0 | — | | — | | 20 | 0 |
| Crystal Palace | 2022–23 | Premier League | 18 | 0 | 1 | 0 | 2 | 1 | — | | — | | 21 | 1 |
| Crystal Palace | Total | | 183 | 28 | 10 | 0 | 5 | 1 | — | | — | | 198 | 29 |
| Shabab Al Ahli | 2023–24 | UAE Pro League | 19 | 1 | 0 | 0 | 0 | 0 | 1 (Note: Appearance in AFC Champions League) | 0 | 0 | 0 | 20 | 1 |
| Shabab Al Ahli | 2024–25 | UAE Pro League | 22 | 3 | 0 | 0 | 0 | 0 | 1 (Note: Appearance in AFC Champions League) | 0 | 0 | 0 | 22 | 3 |
| Career total | | | 395 | 54 | 28 | 4 | 5 | 1 | 36 | 0 | 1 | 0 | 464 | 59 |

=== International ===
Appearances and goals by national team and year
| National team | Year | Apps | Goals |
|---|---|---|---|
| Serbia | 2012 | 1 | 0 |
| Serbia | 2013 | 6 | 0 |
| Serbia | 2014 | 0 | 0 |
| Serbia | 2015 | 4 | 0 |
| Serbia | 2016 | 8 | 0 |
| Serbia | 2017 | 5 | 1 |
| Serbia | 2018 | 6 | 0 |
| Serbia | 2019 | 6 | 0 |
| Serbia | 2020 | 2 | 0 |
| Total | | 38 | 1 |

Scores and results list Serbia's goal tally first, score column indicates score after each Milivojević goal.

List of international goals scored by Luka Milivojević
| No. | Date | Venue | Opponent | Score | Result | Competition |
|---|---|---|---|---|---|---|
| 1 | 6 October 2017 | Ernst-Happel-Stadion, Vienna, Austria | Austria | 1–0 | 2–3 | 2018 FIFA World Cup qualification |

== Honours ==
=== Club ===
Red Star Belgrade

- Serbian Cup: 2011–12

Anderlecht

- Belgian Pro League: 2013–14
- Belgian Super Cup: 2014

Olympiacos

- Super League Greece: 2014–15, 2015–16
- Greek Cup: 2014–15

=== Individual ===
- Serbian SuperLiga Team of the Season: 2011–12, 2012–13

Sporting positions
| Preceded by Jason Puncheon | Captain of Crystal Palace; 2018–2023 | Succeeded by Joel Ward |
