= Bruno Mezenga =

Brazilian footballer (born 1988)

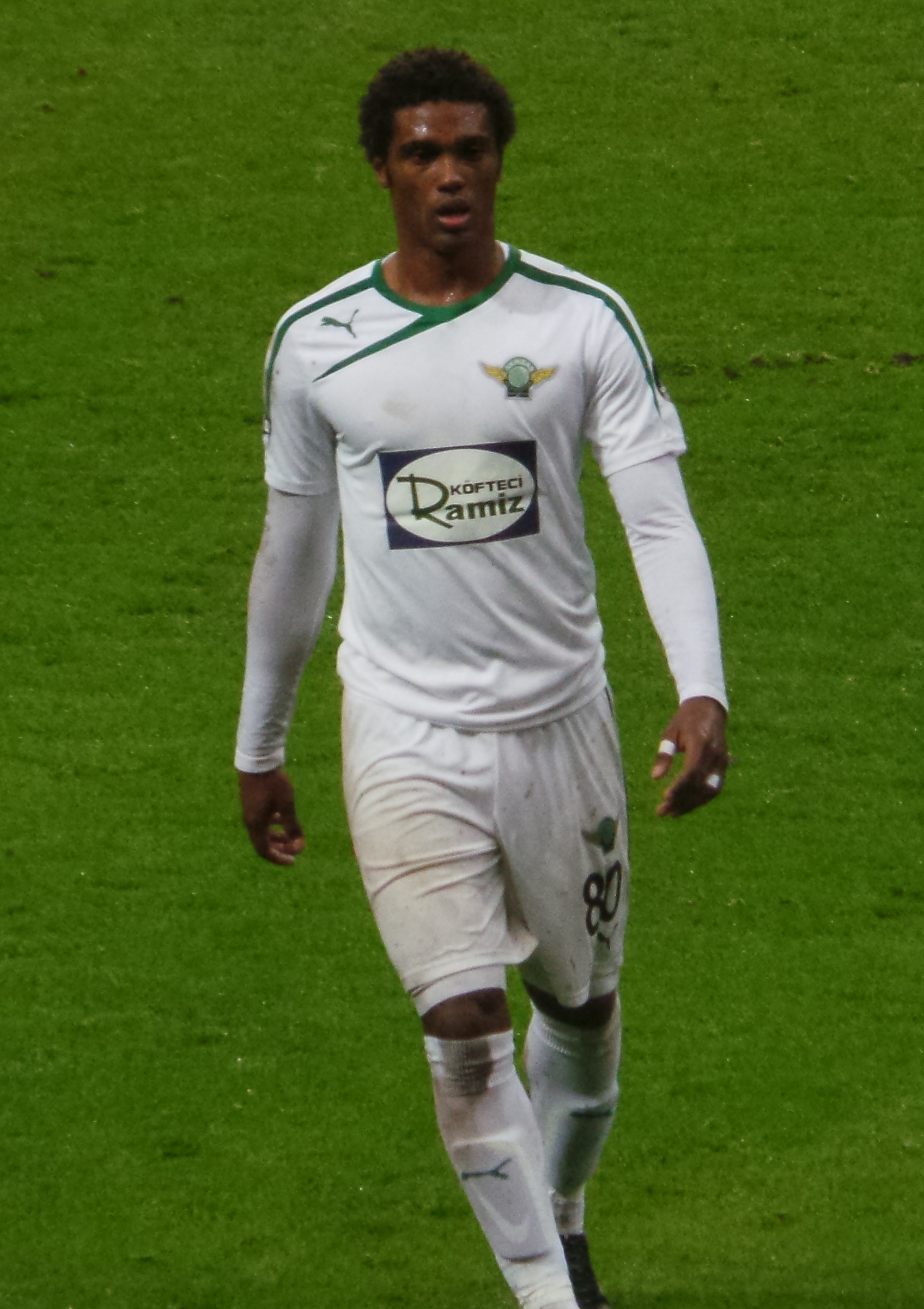
- Bruno Mezenga with Akhisar Belediyespor in 2014

Personal information
- Full name: Bruno Ferreira Mombra Rosa
- Date of birth: 8 August 1988 (age 38)
- Place of birth: Niterói, Brazil
- Height: 1.85 m (6 ft 1 in)
- Position: Forward

Team information
- Current team: Ituano

Youth career
- 2003–2006: Flamengo

Senior career*
Years	Team	Apps	(Gls)
2005–2011	Flamengo	27	(4)
2007	→ Fortaleza (loan)	8	(1)
2008	→ Macaé (loan)	14	(3)
2008–2009	→ Orduspor (loan)	33	(21)
2010–2011	→ Legia Warsaw (loan)	13	(3)
2011	→ Red Star Belgrade (loan)	11	(1)
2012–2013	Orduspor	9	(0)
2012–2013	→ Akhisar Belediyespor (loan)	31	(5)
2013–2016	Akhisar Belediyespor	84	(16)
2016–2018	Eskişehirspor	66	(25)
2019	São Caetano	9	(4)
2019	Vila Nova	11	(4)
2020	PT Prachuap	4	(0)
2020–2021	Ferroviária	22	(13)
2021–2022	Goiás	29	(4)
2022	→ Ferroviária (loan)	13	(4)
2022	→ CSA (loan)	13	(0)
2023–2024	Água Santa	25	(8)
2023	→ Santos (loan)	9	(0)
2024–2025	Náutico	42	(9)
2026–	Ituano	34	(3)

International career
2005	Brazil U17	2	(0)
Medal record
Men's football
Representing Brazil
FIFA U-17 World Cup
Runner-up	2005 Peru
- * Club domestic league appearances and goals as of 11 November 2026

Bruno Ferreira Mombra Rosa (born 8 August 1988), known as Bruno Mezenga, is a Brazilian professional footballer who plays as a forward for Ituano.

== Club career ==
=== Flamengo ===
==== Beginnings ====
Born in Niterói, Rio de Janeiro, Bruno Mezenga joined Flamengo's youth setup in 2003. After scoring in a regular basis for the youth sides, he made his first team – and Série A – debut at the age of 16 on 22 May 2005, coming on as a second-half substitute for China in a 1–0 away defeat to São Caetano.

After five first-team appearances in 2005, Bruno Mezenga returned to the under-20s for the 2006 Copa São Paulo de Futebol Júnior. Back in the first team during that year, he only featured rarely.

==== Loans to Fortaleza, Macaé and Orduspor ====
On 28 May 2007, Bruno Mezenga was loaned to Série B side Fortaleza until the end of the year. He scored his first professional goal on 8 June of that year, netting the winner in a 1–0 success over rivals Ceará.

On 22 December 2007, Bruno Mezenga moved to Macaé on loan for the 2008 Campeonato Carioca. He moved abroad in the middle of 2008, after being loaned out to TFF First League side Orduspor.

==== 2009–10: Return from loan ====
Bruno Mezenga returned to Fla in June 2009, after scoring 21 goals for Orduspor. He scored his first goals for the club the following 20 January, netting a brace in a 3–1 Campeonato Carioca away win over Volta Redonda.

A backup to Adriano and Vágner Love, Bruno Mezenga finished the 2010 Campeonato Carioca with four goals.

==== Loan to Legia Warsaw ====
In May 2010, Bruno Mezenga was loaned to Legia Warsaw on a one-year deal. Mainly used as a substitute, he scored his first goal for the club on 24 September, netting the winner in a 2–1 home success over Lech Poznań.

Bruno Mezenga returned to Flamengo in June 2011, after scoring three goals in 16 appearances overall.

==== Loan to Red Star Belgrade ====
On 22 June 2011, Bruno Mezenga switched teams and countries again, after joining Serbian side Red Star Belgrade for a season-long loan deal. He scored on his debut, netting a last-minute winner in a 2–1 UEFA Europa League away success over Ventspils.

=== Orduspor ===
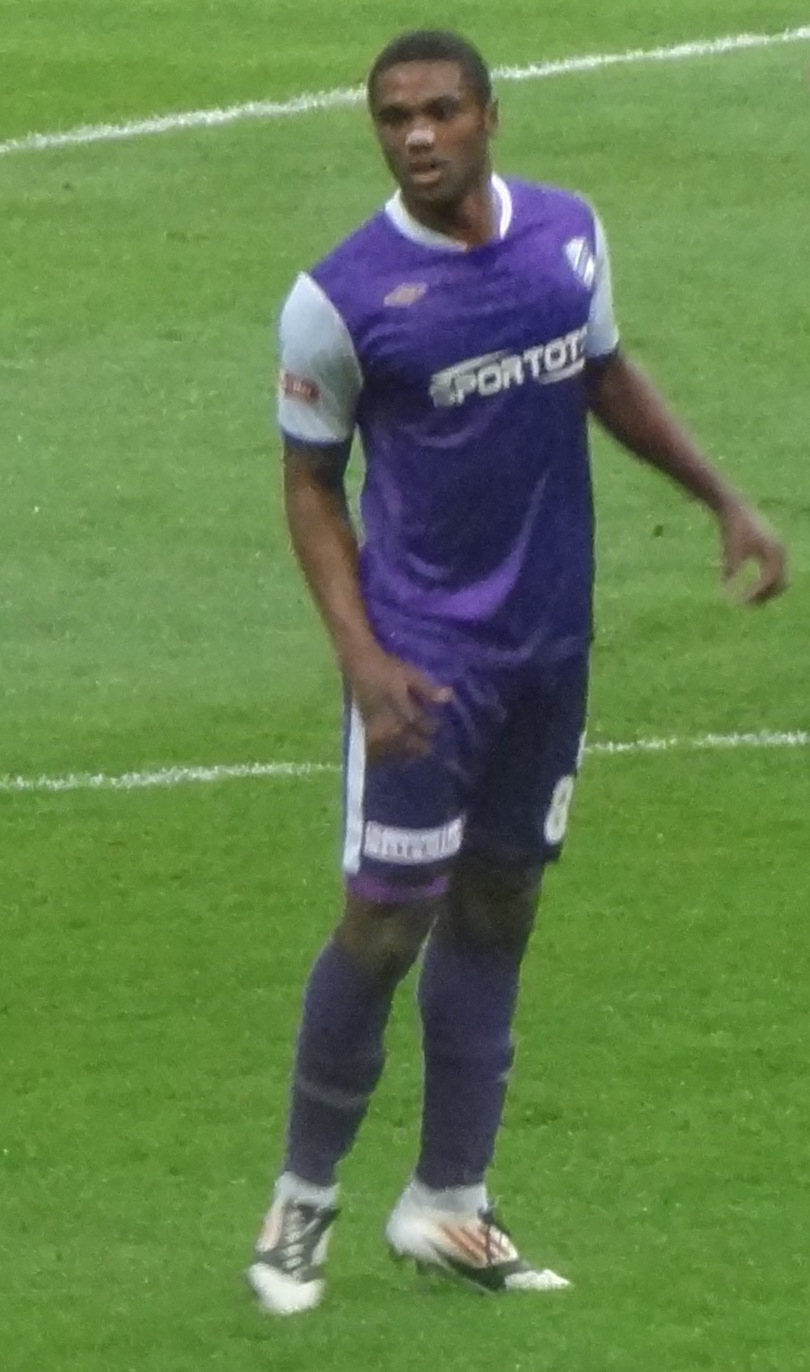
Bruno Mezenga with Orduspor in 2012

On 3 January 2012, Bruno Mezenga rejoined Orduspor on a free transfer, signing a four-and-a-half-year contract with the club now in the Süper Lig. Despite scoring six times in the Spor Toto Cup as his side finished second, he failed to found the net in his nine league matches of the season.

=== Akhisar Belediyespor ===
On 11 July 2012, Bruno Mezenga was loaned to fellow top-tier side Akhisar Belediyespor for the 2012–13 campaign. Regularly used, he signed a permanent deal with the club in August 2013.

=== Eskişehirspor ===
On 20 July 2016, Bruno Mezenga signed a two-year contract with Eskişehirspor, in the Turkish second division. After scoring 17 league goals in his first season as the club narrowly missed out promotion, he added a further eight in his second, but the side only managed to avoid relegation.

=== São Caetano ===
On 24 September 2018, Bruno Mezenga returned to Brazil after eight years, and agreed to join São Caetano. However, he was only officially announced by the club on 11 December.

Bruno Mezenga scored four times in nine matches for Azulão during the 2019 Campeonato Paulista, as the club suffered relegation.

=== Vila Nova ===
On 5 August 2019, Bruno Mezenga joined Vila Nova in the second division. He also scored four goals for the side, featuring sparingly as the club also suffered relegation.

=== PT Prachuap ===
On 14 December 2019, Bruno Mezenga was announced at Thai League 1 side PT Prachuap. He played four matches for the side before leaving due to the COVID-19 pandemic.

=== Ferroviária ===
On 15 June 2020, Bruno Mezenga returned to his home country and signed a two-year contract with Ferroviária. He was the top scorer of the 2021 Campeonato Paulista with the club, scoring nine goals.

=== Goiás ===
On 25 May 2021, Bruno Mezenga signed for Goiás. A backup option to starters Nicolas and Alef Manga, he scored four goals as the club achieved promotion to the top tier.

==== Loans to Ferroviária and CSA ====
Shortly after achieving promotion, Goiás loaned Bruno Mezenga back to his former club Ferroviária for the 2022 Paulistão. On 9 April 2022, he was announced at CSA, also on loan.

=== Água Santa ===
On 7 January 2023, Bruno Mezenga was announced as the new signing of Água Santa. He scored twice in the first leg of the 2023 Campeonato Paulista Finals to put his side 2–1 ahead of Palmeiras, but could not prevent an aggregate 5–2 loss in the second leg.

==== Loan to Santos ====
On 12 April 2023, Bruno Mezenga moved to top-tier side Santos on loan until the end of the year. He made his debut for the club four days later, replacing Dodi late into a 1–0 away loss against Grêmio.

Bruno Mezenga scored his first goal for Peixe on 31 May 2023, netting a late equalizer in a 1–1 away draw against Bahia, for the year's Copa do Brasil, but missed the decisive penalty as his club was eliminated 4–3 in the shoot-out.

== International career ==
In 2005, Bruno Mezenga was a part of the Brazil national under-17 team in the 2005 FIFA U-17 World Championship, where Brazil lost in the final against Mexico by 3–0. He played two matches in the tournament, including the final, where he was used as a substitute.

== Personal life ==
Bruno Mezenga is the godfather of another footballer, Lucas Mezenga.

== Career statistics ==
As of 14 August 2023

Appearances and goals by club, season and competition
Club	Season	League			State League		Cup		Continental		Other		Total	
Club	Season	Division	Apps	Goals	Apps	Goals	Apps	Goals	Apps	Goals	Apps	Goals	Apps	Goals
Flamengo	2005	Série A	6	0	0	0	0	0	—		—		6	0
Flamengo	2006	Série A	2	0	1	0	0	0	—		—		3	0
Flamengo	2007	Série A	1	0	1	0	—		0	0	—		2	0
Flamengo	2009	Série A	7	0	0	0	0	0	0	0	—		7	0
Flamengo	2010	Série A	2	0	7	4	—		3 (Note: Appearance(s) in Copa Libertadores)	0	—		12	4
Flamengo	Total		18	0	9	4	0	0	3	0	—		30	4
Fortaleza (loan)	2007	Série B	8	1	—		—		—		—		8	1
Macaé (loan)	2008	Série C	0	0	14	3	—		—		—		14	3
Orduspor (loan)	2008–09	TFF First League	32	21	—		0	0	—		—		32	21
Legia Warsaw (loan)	2010–11	Ekstraklasa	13	3	—		3	0	—		—		16	3
Red Star Belgrade (loan)	2010–11	Serbian SuperLiga	11	1	—		3	2	4 (Note: Appearance(s) in UEFA Europa League)	2	—		18	5
Orduspor	2011–12	Süper Lig	9	0	—		0	0	—		7 (Note: Appearance(s) in Spor Toto Cup)	6	16	6
Akhisar Belediyespor	2012–13	Süper Lig	31	5	—		2	0	—		—		33	5
Akhisar Belediyespor	2013–14	Süper Lig	31	11	—		7	0	—		—		38	11
Akhisar Belediyespor	2014–15	Süper Lig	31	3	—		7	1	—		—		38	4
Akhisar Belediyespor	2015–16	Süper Lig	22	2	—		7	1	—		—		29	3
Akhisar Belediyespor	Total		115	21	—		23	2	—		—		138	23
Eskişehirspor	2016–17	TFF First League	35	17	—		1	0	—		—		36	17
Eskişehirspor	2017–18	TFF First League	31	8	—		0	0	—		—		31	8
Eskişehirspor	Total		66	25	—		1	0	—		—		67	25
São Caetano	2019	Série D	0	0	9	4	—		—		—		9	4
Vila Nova	2019	Série B	11	4	—		—		—		—		11	4
PT Prachuap	2020	Thai League 1	4	0	—		0	0	—		—		4	0
Ferroviária	2020	Série D	7	2	3	2	1	0	—		—		11	4
Ferroviária	2021	Série D	0	0	12	9	—		—		—		12	9
Ferroviária	Total		7	2	15	11	1	0	—		—		23	13
Goiás	2021	Série B	29	4	—		—		—		—		29	4
Ferroviária (loan)	2022	Série D	0	0	13	4	0	0	—		—		13	4
CSA (loan)	2022	Série B	13	0	—		2	0	—		—		15	0
Água Santa	2023	Paulista	—		14	7	—		—		—		14	7
Santos (loan)	2023	Série A	9	0	—		2	1	—		—		11	1
Career total			345	82	74	33	35	5	7	2	7	6	468	128

== Honours ==
Flamengo

- Copa do Brasil: 2006
- Campeonato Carioca: 2007
- Brazilian Série A: 2009

Legia Warsaw

- Polish Cup: 2010–11

Red Star Belgrade

- Serbian Cup: 2011–12

Brazil U17

- FIFA U-17 World Cup runner-up: 2005

Individual

- TFF First League top scorer: 2008–09
- Campeonato Paulista top scorer: 2021
- Campeonato Paulista Team of the Year: 2023
