= Marko Bošković =

Serbian footballer

Personal information
- Full name: Marko Bošković
- Date of birth: 15 April 1982 (age 44)
- Place of birth: Belgrade, SFR Yugoslavia
- Height: 1.84 m (6 ft 1/2 in)
- Position: Defender

Senior career*
Years	Team	Apps	(Gls)
2001–2002	Trudbenik		
2002–2003	Sinđelić Niš		
2004–2012	BSK Borča	201	(9)
2013	Napredak Kruševac	11	(0)
2013–2014	Mladost Lučani	15	(0)
- * Club domestic league appearances and goals as of 25 May 2014

Marko Bošković (Serbian Cyrillic: Марко Бошковић; born 15 April 1982) is a Serbian retired footballer who played as a defender.

His previous clubs were FK Trudbenik, FK Sinđelić Beograd, FK BSK Borča and FK Napredak Kruševac.

== Honours ==
Mladost Lučani

- Serbian First League: 2013–14
