= Vladan Đogatović =

Serbian footballer

Personal information
- Full name: Vladan Đogatović
- Date of birth: 3 November 1984 (age 42)
- Place of birth: Ivanjica, SFR Yugoslavia
- Height: 1.90 m (6 ft 3 in)
- Position: Goalkeeper

Team information
- Current team: Vestri
- Number: 33

Youth career
- Javor Ivanjica

Senior career*
Years	Team	Apps	(Gls)
2003–2010	Javor Ivanjica	0	(0)
2005–2007	→ Dragačevo Guča (loan)		
2008–2009	→ Sloga Kraljevo (loan)	27	(0)
2009	→ Mladost Lučani (loan)	1	(0)
2010	Radnički Kragujevac	14	(0)
2011–2013	Novi Pazar	51	(0)
2013–2014	Metalac Gornji Milanovac	30	(0)
2014–2018	Javor Ivanjica	156	(0)
2019–2022	Grindavík	39	(0)
2021	→ KA Akureyri (loan)	0	(0)
2021–2022	Magni Grenivík	19	(0)
2024–	Vestri	0	(0)
- * Club domestic league appearances and goals as of 19 May 2024

Vladan Đogatović (Serbian Cyrillic: Владан Ђогатовић; born 3 November 1984) is a Serbian professional footballer who plays as a goalkeeper for Icelandic club Vestri.

== Career ==
Đogatović started out at local club Javor Ivanjica, but failed to make his league debut. He instead spent some time on loan at Dragačevo Guča, Sloga Kraljevo, and Mladost Lučani. In the summer of 2010, Đogatović moved to Radnički Kragujevac. He also later played for Novi Pazar and Metalac Gornji Milanovac.

In the summer of 2014, Đogatović returned to Javor Ivanjica, helping them to promotion to the Serbian SuperLiga in the 2014–15 season. He made over 100 appearances in the top flight over the next three seasons, as the club suffered relegation back to the Serbian First League in the 2017–18 season.

In January 2019, Đogatović moved abroad for the first time and signed with Icelandic club Grindavík.

== Honours ==
Sloga Kraljevo

- Serbian League West: 2008–09

Javor Ivanjica

- Serbian First League: 2007–08
- Serbian Cup: Runner-up 2015–16
