= Dušan Dunjić =

Serbian footballer

Personal information
- Full name: Dušan Dunjić
- Date of birth: 29 March 1987 (age 39)
- Place of birth: Kraljevo, SFR Yugoslavia
- Height: 1.83 m (6 ft 0 in)
- Position: Right-back

Senior career*
Years	Team	Apps	(Gls)
2005–2009	Napredak Kruševac	50	(0)
2006–2007	→ Kopaonik Brus (loan)	23	(0)
2009–2012	Borac Čačak	32	(0)
2012	Bregalnica Štip	13	(0)
2013	BSK Borča	12	(0)
2013	Radnički Kragujevac	0	(0)
2014	Inđija	1	(0)
2014	Săgeata Năvodari	3	(0)
2017	Bane		
- * Club domestic league appearances and goals

Dušan Dunjić (Serbian Cyrillic: Душан Дуњић; born 29 March 1987) is a Serbian retired footballer who played as a defender.
