= Roman Sorokin =

Russian footballer

Personal information
- Full name: Roman Andreyevich Sorokin
- Date of birth: 17 May 1985 (age 41)
- Place of birth: Leningrad, Soviet Union
- Height: 1.84 m (6 ft 1/2 in)
- Position: Midfielder

Senior career*
Years	Team	Apps	(Gls)
2004–2005	Zenit-2 St. Petersburg	9	(0)
2006–2009	Saturn-2 Moscow Oblast	53	(5)
2009–2010	Vitebsk	38	(3)
2011–2012	Naftan Novopolotsk	30	(1)
2013	Belshina Bobruisk	26	(0)
2014	Zvezda Saint Petersburg		
- * Club domestic league appearances and goals as of 12 December 2013

Roman Andreyevich Sorokin (Russian: Роман Андреевич Сорокин; born May 17, 1985) is a former Russian professional football player.
