= Nikola Ćesarević =

Serbian footballer

Personal information
- Full name: Nikola Ćesarević
- Date of birth: October 3, 1983 (age 43)
- Place of birth: Belgrade, SFR Yugoslavia
- Height: 1.89 m (6 ft 2 1/2 in)
- Position: Midfielder

Senior career*
Years	Team	Apps	(Gls)
2001–2003	Radnički Beograd	4	(0)
2003–2011	BSK Borča	144	(11)
2004–2005	Rad	0	(0)
2011–2012	Shahrdari Tabriz	0	(0)
- * Club domestic league appearances and goals

Nikola Ćesarević (Serbian Cyrillic: Никола Ћесаревић; born October 3, 1983) is a Serbian retired football midfielder.

He had previously played for FK Radnički Beograd.
