= Vitaliy Berezovskyi =

Ukrainian footballer

Personal information
- Full name: Vitaliy Oleksandrovych Berezovskyi
- Date of birth: 11 April 1984 (age 42)
- Place of birth: Odesa, Ukraine SSR, Soviet Union
- Height: 1.88 m (6 ft 2 in)
- Position: Defender

Team information
- Current team: FC Windisch

Youth career
- 1998–2001: Chornomorets Odesa

Senior career*
Years	Team	Apps	(Gls)
2001–2002	Chornomorets Odesa-2	12	(0)
2003	Dniester Ovidiopol	5	(0)
2003	Real Odesa	3	(0)
2004	Sheriff Tiraspol	1	(0)
2004	Sheriff-2 Tiraspol	14	(3)
2004–2005	Tiraspol	3	(1)
2005–2006	Ros' Bila Tserkva	21	(1)
2006	Ventspils	0	(0)
2007	Avanhard Sutysky	4	(0)
2008–2009	Ihroservice Simferopol	35	(0)
2009–2010	Dinamo Brest	20	(3)
2011–2012	Naftan Novopolotsk	50	(3)
2013	Kaisar	13	(1)
2013–2014	Zirka Kirovohrad	15	(1)
2014–2015	Stomil Olsztyn	27	(1)
2015–2016	Sandecja Nowy Sącz	13	(0)
2017–2019	Svitanok-Ahrosvit Shlyakhova	14	(2)
2019	Olimp Kyrnichki	1	(0)
2020	FC Kulevcha	1	(0)
2022	Hakoah		
2022–2024	Zofingen	39	(3)
2024–	FC Windisch		
- * Club domestic league appearances and goals as of 11 April 2024

Vitaliy Berezovskyi (Ukrainian: Віталій Олександрович Березовський; born 11 April 1984) is a Ukrainian footballer who plays as a defender for Swiss club FC Windisch.

== Playing career ==
Berezovskyi began playing in his hometown city of Odesa, initially with the FC Chornomorets Odesa reserve team, before moving to Dniester Ovidiopol for the 2002–03 season. In 2003, he moved to the Moldova championship to play with Sheriff Tiraspol and FC Tiraspol. In 2005, he moved back to Ukraine with FC Ros' Bila Tserkva, before having a short spell with FK Ventspils in Latvia. In 2007, he moved to FC Ihroservice Simferopol.

== Honours ==
Sheriff Tiraspol

- Moldovan Super Liga: 2003–04

Naftan Novopolotsk

- Belarusian Cup: 2011–12
