= Quincy Osei =

Ghanaian football midfielder (born 1989)

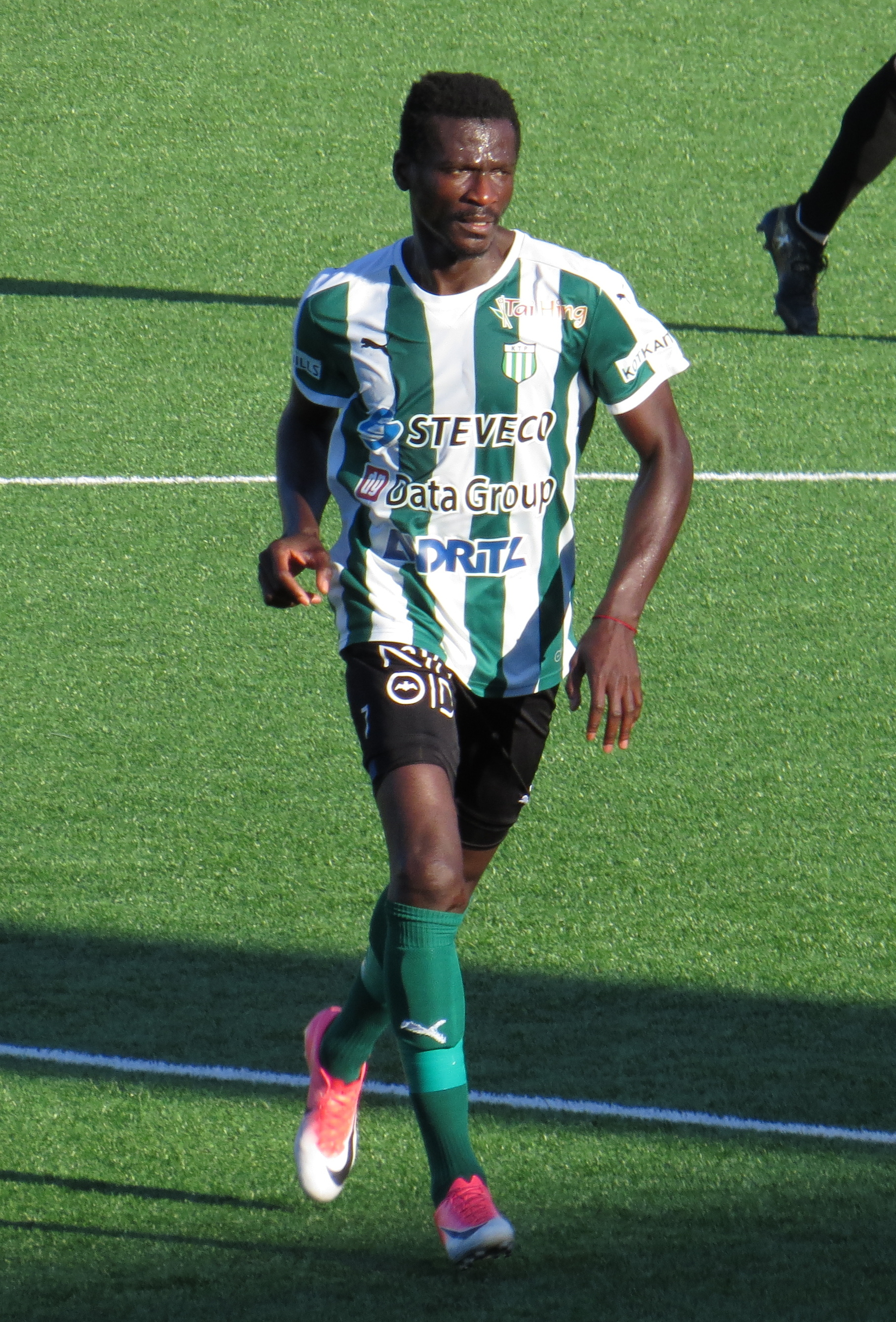

Personal information
- Date of birth: 8 December 1989 (age 36)
- Place of birth: Accra, Ghana
- Height: 1.85 m (6 ft 1 in)
- Position: Midfielder

Team information
- Current team: Alsancak Yeşilova SK

Senior career*
Years	Team	Apps	(Gls)
2007–2009	Bechem United	15	(9)
2010	FC Haka	22	(1)
2011	Hajduk Kula	8	(0)
2012	Club Valencia	9	(2)
2013	AC Kajaani	21	(1)
2014	BÍ/Bolungarvík		
2014–2015	Hetten FC		
2015–2016	AC Kajaani	46	(8)
2016	Doğan Türk Birliği		
2017	KTP	9	(5)
2017	Doğan Türk Birliği		
2018	KTP	18	(2)
2019	IF Gnistan	1	(0)
2019	FC Viikingit	11	(0)
2019	Türk Ocağı Limasol SK	16	(1)
2020–	Alsancak Yeşilova SK	16	(5)

International career^{‡}
2011	Ghana U23	5	(0)
- * Club domestic league appearances and goals ‡ National team caps and goals as of 00:58, 4 June 2019 (UTC)

Quincy Osei (born 8 December 1989) is a Ghanaian football midfielder who plays for Alsancak Yeşilova SK.

== Career ==
He plays as central midfielder or central back and is 1.86 m height.

Before moving abroad he played with Bechem United in Ghana. He moved to Finland signing with FC Haka. During 2010 he played with FC Haka in the Veikkausliiga where he made 22 league appearances during that season.

In summer 2011 he moved to Serbia and after a month-long trial on August 29 he signed a 3-year contract with FK Hajduk Kula. During the winter break of the 2011–12 season he left Hajduk Kula and joined Club Valencia playing in the Dhivehi League, the highest football league of the Maldives.

In the first half of 2014 he played in Iceland with BÍ/Bolungarvík having played 2 matches in the 2014 Deildabikar. Next he moved to Saudi Arabian first division league side Hetten FC. With Hetten FC he played in the 2014 King Cup of Champions.

In July 2016, Osei joined Doğan Türk Birliği. He joined the club again in August 2017. He left the club again at the end of 2017.

On 14 March 2019, IF Gnistan announced that they had signed with Osei for one game against VPS in the Finnish Cup. In April 2019, he joined FC Viikingit.

== National team ==
Quincy Osei has been part of the Ghana Olympic team during the 2011 CAF U-23 Championship which was the qualifying tournament for the 2012 London Olympics.

http://ghheadlines.com/agency/ghana-web-/20180701/81156258/ghanaian-attacker-quincy-osei-grabs-winner-for-ktp-in-win-over-ac-kajaani

== External sources ==
- Quincy Osei at Soccerway (archived)
- palloliitto.fi
