= Vasilije Prodanović =

Serbian footballer

Personal information
- Full name: Vasilije Prodanović
- Date of birth: November 24, 1985 (age 40)
- Place of birth: Belgrade, SFR Yugoslavia
- Height: 1.80 m (5 ft 11 in)
- Position: Defensive midfielder

Youth career
- Čukarički

Senior career*
| Years | Team | Apps | (Gls) |
| 2003–2004 | Jedinstvo Ub | 24 | (2) |
| 2004–2005 | Čukarički | 11 | (0) |
| 2005–2007 | Zemun | 35 | (1) |
| 2007–2008 | Bežanija | 18 | (0) |
| 2008–2009 | Jagodina | 23 | (1) |
| 2009 | Polonia Bytom | 1 | (0) |
| 2010 | Bežanija | 15 | (0) |
| 2010–2011 | Novi Pazar | 22 | (3) |
| 2011–2012 | Borac Čačak | 21 | (0) |
| 2012–2013 | Kastrioti | 8 | (0) |
| 2013–2014 | Bežanija | 22 | (1) |
| 2014 | Radnik Surdulica | 9 | (0) |
| 2015 | Mačva Šabac | 12 | (1) |
| 2015 | Smederevo | | |
- * Club domestic league appearances and goals

Vasilije Prodanović (Serbian Cyrillic: Василије Продановић; born 24 November 1985) is a Serbian former professional footballer who played as a defensive midfielder.

== Career ==
Born in Belgrade, he previously played with FK Jedinstvo Ub, FK Čukarički, FK Zemun, FK Bežanija, FK Jagodina on Serbia. He had spells abroad with Polonia Bytom in the Polish Ekstraklasa and KS Kastrioti in the Albanian Superliga.

== Honours ==
Radnik Surdulica

- Serbian First League: 2014–15
