= Milan Jovanović (footballer, born July 1983) =

Montenegrin footballer

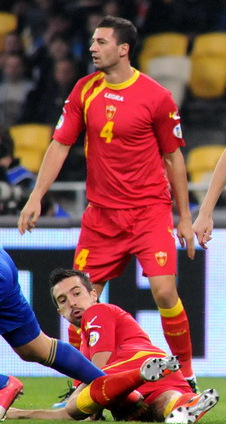
- Jovanović standing over teammate Vladimir Volkov playing for Montenegro in 2012

Personal information
- Date of birth: 21 July 1983 (age 43)
- Place of birth: Čačak, SFR Yugoslavia
- Height: 1.87 m (6 ft 1 1/2 in)
- Position: Centre-back

Senior career*
Years	Team	Apps	(Gls)
2000–2001	Borac Čačak	26	(1)
2002	Mladost Lučani	14	(1)
2002–2003	Železnik	26	(2)
2003	Radnički Beograd	12	(0)
2004	Vaslui	9	(2)
2004–2005	Universitatea Craiova	5	(0)
2005–2006	Radnički Niš	33	(2)
2006–2007	Unirea Urziceni	12	(0)
2007–2008	Universitatea Cluj	16	(1)
2009–2010	Rapid Wien	9	(0)
2010–2012	Spartak Nalchik	21	(1)
2012–2013	Red Star Belgrade	9	(0)
2013–2014	Lokomotiv Sofia	12	(0)
2014–2015	Padideh	16	(2)
2015	Siah Jamegan	4	(0)
Total		224	(12)

International career
2007–2014	Montenegro	36	(0)
- * Club domestic league appearances and goals

Milan Jovanović (Serbian Cyrillic: Милан Јовановић, pronounced [mǐlan jǒʋanoʋitɕ, – joʋǎː-]; born 21 July 1983), also known locally as Mrva, is a Montenegrin retired footballer. In international competition he has represented Montenegro as well as fifteen clubs, although he never played for a Montenegrin club. He announced the end of his professional football career in October 2015.

== Club career ==
Born in Čačak, SR Serbia, SFR Yugoslavia, Jovanović started playing football at a major local club, FK Borac Čačak. Before coming in 2003 at FC Vaslui, he also played for FK Mladost Lučani and FK Železnik. After one season at FC Vaslui, Jovanović was transferred to FC Universitatea Craiova. In 2005, he turned back in Serbia, and played for the second division team FK Radnički Niš. Unirea Urziceni was the team that brought Jovanović again to Romania in 2006. In 2007 the new promoted Universitatea Cluj, bought the Montenegrin footballer with €119.000 . On 20 February 2009 Spartak Nalchik have signed the Montenegro international defender from Romanian club U Cluj. His contract with Spartak Nalchik has been canceled and at the end of March he arrived in Red Star Belgrade on trial. On 8 June 2009, he signed a 2-year-contract for Austria's record-champion Rapid Wien.

=== Red Star Belgrade ===
On the morning of 27 June 2012, Jovanović signed a 2-year-contract for Red Star Belgrade. After an impressive half season with Red Star, Jovanović was thrown out of the senior team because of partying with alcoholic beverages in Antalya, Turkey. In April 2013, after a second alcoholic beverage-related incident, Jovanović formally terminated his contract with Red Star Belgrade.

=== Padideh ===
On 14 May 2014, Jovanović signed a two-year contract with Iran Pro League side Padideh, effective from 1 June 2014. He made his debut for Padideh in a 0–0 draw against Malavan on 1 August 2014.

== International career ==
Despite being born in Serbia, Jovanović received a call from the Montenegro to play for its newly formed national team in 2007 and opted to play for Montenegro. He made his debut for Montenegro in his country's first ever competitive match on 24 March 2007, a friendly against Hungary in Podgorica and has earned a total of 36 caps, scoring no goals. On 12 October 2010, spectators were impressed when Jovanović shot a spectacular 30-meter ball which hit the goalpost in a 0–0 draw with England at Wembley Stadium.

His final international was an October 2014 European Championship qualification match against Liechtenstein.

== Career statistics ==
Club performance			League		Cup		Continental		Total	
Season	Club	League	Apps	Goals	Apps	Goals	Apps	Goals	Apps	Goals
Serbia			League		Serbian Cup		Europe		Total	
2012–13	Red Star Belgrade	SuperLiga	9	0	2	1	4	0	15	1
			League		Cup		Continental		Total	
Total	Serbia		9	0	2	1	4	0	15	1
Career total			9	0	2	1	4	0	15	1
