= Nenad Kovačević =

Serbian footballer

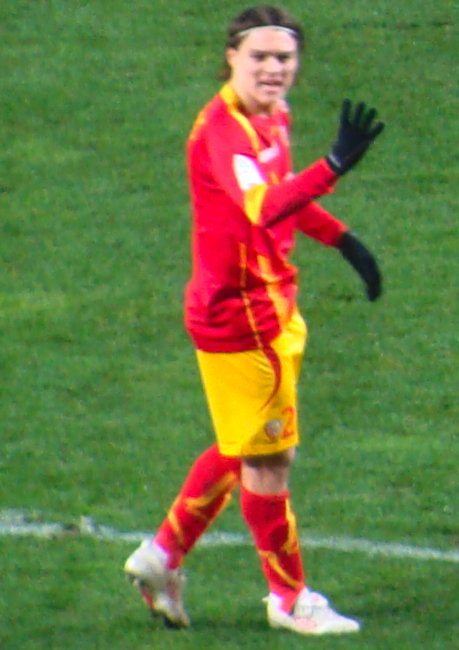
- Kovačević with Lens in December 2009

Personal information
- Date of birth: 11 November 1980 (age 45)
- Place of birth: Kraljevo, SFR Yugoslavia
- Height: 1.77 m (5 ft 10 in)
- Position: Defensive midfielder

Youth career
- Bubamara Kraljevo
- Sloga Kraljevo

Senior career*
Years	Team	Apps	(Gls)
1996–1997	Sloga Kraljevo	2	(0)
1997–1998	Jedinstvo Ub	17	(0)
1998–1999	Big Bull Bačinci	8	(2)
1999–2000	Borac Čačak	17	(0)
2000–2002	Budućnost Banatski Dvor	41	(1)
2002–2006	Red Star Belgrade	85	(1)
2006–2011	Lens	128	(0)
2011	Red Star Belgrade	12	(0)
2011–2013	Baku	20	(0)
2013	UTA Arad	5	(0)
2013–2015	Nîmes	50	(1)
2015	Zemun	5	(0)
Total		390	(5)

International career
2003–2008	Serbia (Note: Including 8 caps for Serbia and Montenegro)	25	(0)

Managerial career
- 2017: Podunavac Belegiš
- 2017–2018: Sopot
- 2019: OFK Vršac
- 2019–2020: Radnički Sremska Mitrovica
- 2021–2022: OFK Kikinda
- 2024: OFK Mladenovac
- * Club domestic league appearances and goals

Nenad Kovačević (Serbian Cyrillic: Ненад Ковачевић; born 11 November 1980) is a Serbian former professional footballer who played as a defensive midfielder.

== Club career ==
Kovačević captained Red Star Belgrade and joined French top-tier outfit Lens in 2006.

== International career ==
On the national level, Kovačević played 8 times for the Serbia and Montenegro team between 2003 and 2005 and another 17 for Serbia, totalling 25 caps (no goals). His final international was a May 2008 friendly match against Russia.

== Career statistics ==
Appearances and goals by club, season and competition
Club	Season	League			Cup		Continental		Other		Total	
Club	Season	Division	Apps	Goals	Apps	Goals	Apps	Goals	Apps	Goals	Apps	Goals
Red Star	2002–03	SuperLiga	28	0	?	?	4	0	-	-	32	0
Red Star	2003–04	SuperLiga	7	0	?	?	1	0	-	-	8	0
Red Star	2004–05	SuperLiga	22	0	?	?	2	0	-	-	24	0
Red Star	2005–06	SuperLiga	25	1	?	?	6	0	-	-	31	1
Red Star	2006–07	SuperLiga	3	0	?	?	4	0	-	-	7	0
Red Star	Total		85	1			17	0			102	1
Lens	2006–07	Ligue 1	31	0	0	0	0	0	0	0	31	0
Lens	2007–08	Ligue 1	34	0	0	0	6	0	0	0	40	0
Lens	2008–09	Ligue 2	21	0	0	0	0	0	2	0	23	0
Lens	2009–10	Ligue 1	26	0	3	0	0	0	1	0	30	0
Lens	2010–11	Ligue 1	16	0	1	0	0	0	1	0	18	0
Lens	Total		128	0	4	0	6	0	4	0	142	1
Red Star	2011–12	SuperLiga	12	0	2	0	4	0	-	-	18	0
Baku	2011–12	Premier League	9	0	4	0	0	0	-	-	13	0
Baku	2012–13	Premier League	11	0	0	0	2	0	-	-	13	0
Baku	Total		20	0	4	0	2	0	-	-	26	0
UTA Arad	2012–13	Liga II	5	0	0	0	0	0	-	-	5	0
Nîmes	2013–14	Ligue 2	35	1	0	0	0	0	2	0	37	1
Nîmes	2014–15	Ligue 2	15	0	0	0	0	0	0	0	15	0
Nîmes	Total		50	1	0	0	0	0	2	0	52	1
Zemun	2015–16	First League	5	0	0	0	0	0	-	-	5	0
Career total			305	2	10	0	29	0	6	0	350	2

=== International ===
National team	Year	Apps	Goals
Serbia and Montenegro / Serbia	2003	5	0
Serbia and Montenegro / Serbia	2004	0	0
Serbia and Montenegro / Serbia	2005	3	0
Serbia and Montenegro / Serbia	2006	5	0
Serbia and Montenegro / Serbia	2007	9	0
Serbia and Montenegro / Serbia	2008	4	0
Serbia and Montenegro / Serbia	Total	26	0

== Honours ==
Red Star Belgrade

- First League of Serbia and Montenegro: 2003–04, 2005–06
- Serbia and Montenegro Cup: 2003–04, 2005–06

Lens

- Ligue 2: 2008–09
