= Stevan Luković =

Serbian footballer

Personal information
- Date of birth: 16 March 1993 (age 33)
- Place of birth: Prokuplje, FR Yugoslavia
- Height: 1.81 m (5 ft 11 in)
- Positions: Midfielder; full-back

Team information
- Current team: FC Tempo Frankfurt
- Number: 27

Senior career*
Years	Team	Apps	(Gls)
2009–2014	Red Star Belgrade	0	(0)
2009–2012	→ Sopot (loan)	69	(6)
2012	→ Kolubara (loan)	10	(0)
2013	→ Grbalj (loan)	13	(1)
2014–2015	Napredak Kruševac	39	(1)
2016	Mladost Lučani	13	(1)
2016–2019	Zemun	75	(2)
2019	Budućnost Dobanovci	11	(1)
2019–2020	Lafnitz	12	(0)
2020	Budućnost Dobanovci	11	(1)
2021	Iskra Danilovgrad	14	(0)
2022	Hanauer SC 1960	3	(0)
2022-	FC Tempo Frankfurt	50	(13)
- * Club domestic league appearances and goals as of 00:05, 6 August 2019 (UTC)

Stevan Luković (Serbian Cyrillic: Стеван Луковић; born 16 March 1993) is a Serbian football midfielder who plays for German amateur side FC Tempo Frankfurt.

== Career ==
After three seasons playing as a loaned player in Football club Sopot, which was reserve team of Red Star Belgrade when Vladan Lukić was a president, he returned in first team. But, he was third, or fourth player on the same position, and he was loaned again, first to Kolubara and then to Grbalj. After return from Grbalj, he was licensed for Red Star, but didn't play. In 2014, contract was broken and he left the club as a free agent. He signed with Napredak Kruševac on 10 February 2014. He made his Jelen SuperLiga debut for Napredak Kruševac on 30 March 2014 against Spartak Subotica on Mladost Stadium. At the beginning of 2016, Luković joined Mladost Lučani.
