= Marko Mirić =

Serbian former footballer

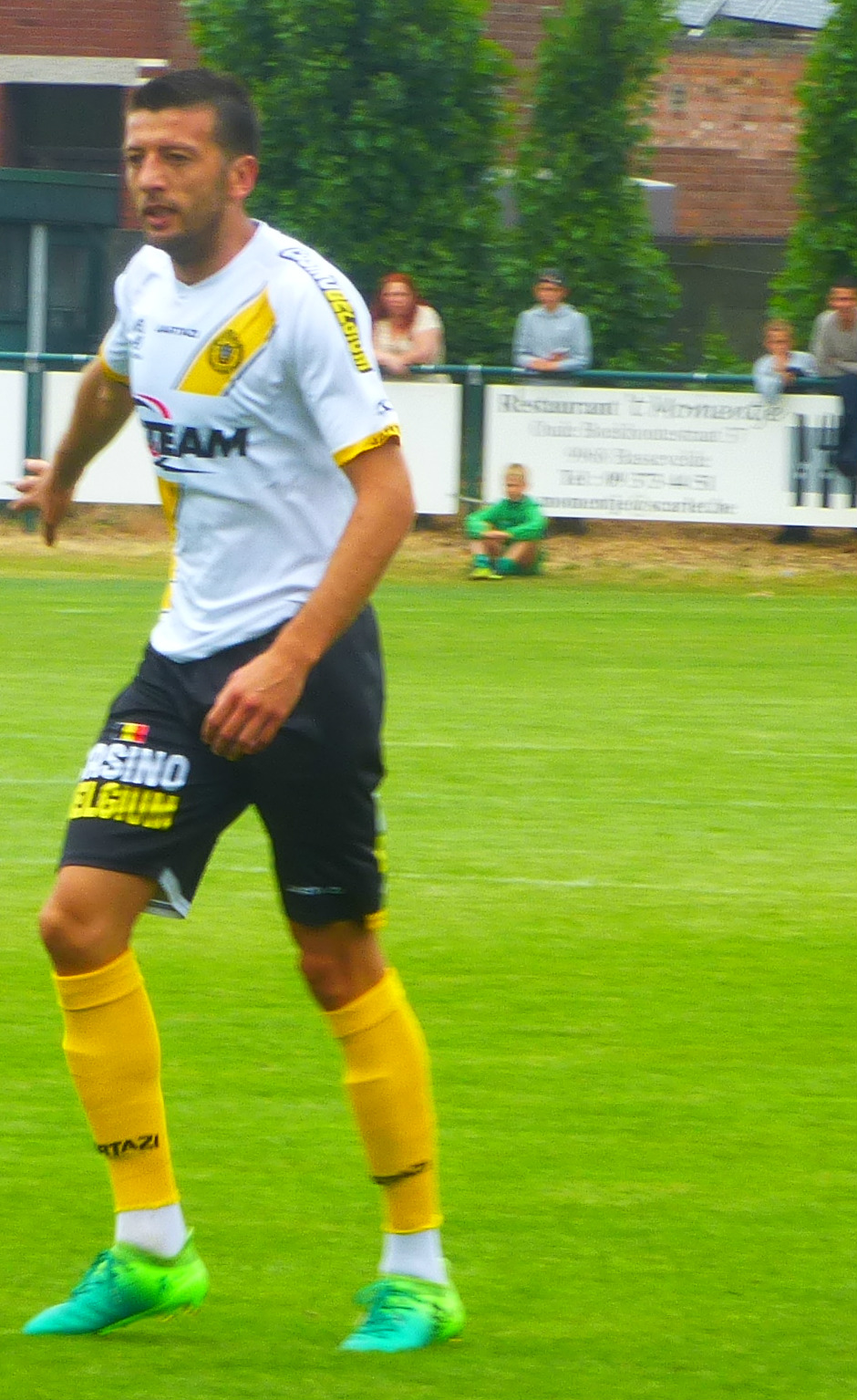
- Mirić playing for Lokeren in 2017

Personal information
- Full name: Marko Mirić
- Date of birth: 26 March 1987 (age 39)
- Place of birth: Kragujevac, SFR Yugoslavia
- Height: 1.93 m (6 ft 4 in)
- Positions: Winger; attacking midfielder

Youth career
- 1995–2005: Zastava Kragujevac

Senior career*
Years	Team	Apps	(Gls)
2005–2006	Vodojaža	27	(7)
2006–2009	Metalac Gornji Milanovac	54	(3)
2009–2012	Spartak Subotica	69	(10)
2012–2013	Red Star Belgrade	18	(1)
2013	→ Radnički Kragujevac (loan)	11	(0)
2014	Minsk	15	(3)
2014–2015	Slaven Belupo	30	(10)
2015–2019	Lokeren	106	(20)
2019–2020	Borac Banja Luka	17	(1)
2020–2022	Radnički Kragujevac	60	(16)
2022–2023	Mladost Lučani	42	(4)
2024	Metalac Gornji Milanovac	13	(1)
2024-2025	Polet Ljubić	12	(7)
2025	Napredak Markovac	12	(4)
2026-	Divostin	0	(0)

International career
2010–2011	Serbia	3	(0)
- * Club domestic league appearances and goals as of 29 June 2026

Marko Mirić (Serbian Cyrillic: Марко Мирић; born 26 March 1987) is a Serbian veteran footballer who plays as a right winger, although occasionally as a striker or attacking midfielder. After years of professional football, he only recently came out of retirement to play for Divostin, who secured their promotion to the sixth tier of Serbian football.

On the national level, Mirić made his debut for Serbia in a November 2010 friendly match away against Bulgaria and earned a total of 3 caps (no goals). His final international was a June 2011 friendly against Australia.

== Coaching career ==
A few months after retirement, he took on the Napredak Markovac managerial job, while they were sitting 12th in the table on 10 points after 9 games in. His first game in charge was against Budućnost Krušik, where his team drew 1-1 only in the 89th minute. He led the team until the end of the season, finishing in 11th on 38 points, averaging 0.86 points per game.

== Honours ==
Red Star Belgrade

- Serbian Cup: 2011–12
