= Filip Janković =

Serbian footballer

Personal information
- Full name: Filip Janković
- Date of birth: 17 January 1995 (age 31)
- Place of birth: Belgrade, FR Yugoslavia
- Height: 1.74 m (5 ft 8 1/2 in)
- Position: Attacking midfielder

Youth career
- 2006–2013: Red Star Belgrade

Senior career*
Years	Team	Apps	(Gls)
2011–2013	Red Star Belgrade	1	(0)
2013–2015	Parma	0	(0)
2014–2015	→ Catania (loan)	8	(0)
2016	Domžale	2	(0)
2016–2017	Radomlje	20	(2)
2017–2018	Extremadura	2	(0)
2018	→ Córdoba B (loan)	7	(0)
2019–2021	Triglav Kranj	24	(3)
2021-2022	Ilirija 1911	11	(0)
2022	Podgorica	4	(0)
2023	Laktaši	15	(1)

International career
2011–2012	Serbia U17 (Note: Official UEFA matches only.)	6	(2)
2015	Serbia U20 (Note: Official FIFA matches only.)	1	(0)
Medal record
Gold medal – first place	FIFA U-20 World Cup	2015
- * Club domestic league appearances and goals as of 14 May 2022

Filip Janković (Serbian Cyrillic: Филип Јанковић; born 17 January 1995) is a Serbian footballer who plays as an attacking midfielder. He most recently played for Slovenian club Triglav Kranj.

== Career ==
He debuted for Red Star Belgrade first team on 4 August 2011 in the UEFA Europa League qualification match versus Latvian team Ventspils. On that day he had 16 years, 6 months and 18 days, making him the youngest Red Star player who played in UEFA competitions, and second youngest in the club history.

== Honours ==
=== Club ===
Red Star

- Serbian Cup (1): 2011–12

=== International ===
Serbia

- FIFA U-20 World Cup (1): 2015
