= Aleksandar Kirovski =

Serbian footballer

Personal information
- Full name: Aleksandar Kirovski
- Date of birth: 25 December 1990 (age 35)
- Place of birth: Belgrade, SFR Yugoslavia
- Height: 1.91 m (6 ft 3 in)
- Position: Goalkeeper

Youth career
- Zemun

Senior career*
Years	Team	Apps	(Gls)
2008–2011	Zemun	89	(0)
2011–2013	Red Star Belgrade	2	(0)
2013–2017	Zemun	73	(0)
2017–2018	Čukarički	20	(0)
2018	Vardar	0	(0)
2019	Budućnost Dobanovci	12	(0)
2019–2020	Žarkovo	13	(0)
2020	Budućnost Dobanovci	3	(0)

International career
2008–2009	Serbia U19	10	(0)
2011–2012	Serbia U21	2	(0)

Managerial career
- 2021: Borac Sakule (assistant)
- 2022–2023: Partizan (young team–goalkeeping coach)
- 2023–2026: Teleoptik (goalkeeping coach)
- 2024: Partizan (goalkeeping coach)
- 2026–: Bor (analyst)
- * Club domestic league appearances and goals

Aleksandar Kirovski (Serbian Cyrillic: Александар Кировски; born 25 December 1990) is a Serbian retired footballer, who played as a goalkeeper, currently works as an analyst in Bor.

== Club career ==
Kirovski started his career with Zemun in the 2008–09 season. He was first choice goalkeeper for three seasons, making near 100 official appearances for the club. Kirovski then spent two seasons at Red Star Belgrade, before returning to Zemun in the summer of 2013. Kirovski was elected for the best goalkeeper in the 2016–17 Serbian First League season, by Serbian newspaper Sportski žurnal. On 22 June 2017, Kirovski signed a two-year deal with Čukarički. After a season with Čukarički, Kirovski mutually terminated the contract and left the club following the end of the 2017–18 Serbian SuperLiga campaign. On 20 June, Kirovski was promoted as a new player of Vardar by the sporting director, Darko Pančev. In December 2018, Kirovski terminated the contract with and left Vardar as a free agent, missing to make any official appearance for the club.

On 5 February 2019, Kirovski joined FK Budućnost Dobanovci. After a short spell at OFK Žarkovo, Kirovski returned to Budućnost Dobanovci in January 2020, before retiring four months later at the age of 30, in May 2020, after his fifth back surgery.

== International career ==
Kirovski represented Serbia at the 2009 UEFA Under-19 Championship. He made his debut for the Serbian national under-21 team in a friendly match against the Bulgarian national under-21 team on 25 March 2011, a 4–1 home win. His second cap came in a 2–0 home friendly win over Moldova U21 on 14 August 2012.
