= Ivan Milosavljević (footballer, born 1983) =

Serbian footballer

Personal information
- Full name: Ivan Milosavljević
- Date of birth: 14 February 1983 (age 43)
- Place of birth: Smederevo, SFR Yugoslavia
- Height: 1.78 m (5 ft 10 in)
- Position: Defender

Senior career*
Years	Team	Apps	(Gls)
2003–2007	INON Požarevac	100	(6)
2007–2010	Seljak Mihajlovac		
2010–2012	Smederevo	47	(1)
2012–2015	Rudar Kostolac	72	(1)
2015–2019	Smederevo 1924	82	(0)
2019–2020	Proleter Mihajlovac		
- * Club domestic league appearances and goals

Ivan Milosavljević (Serbian Cyrillic: Иван Милосављевић; born 14 February 1983) is a Serbian retired footballer who played as a defender.

== Career ==
Born in Smederevo, Milosavljević began playing football in the lower levels of Serbian football. He signed with SuperLiga side FK Smederevo in 2010, and scored his first league goal for the club in a 2–1 victory over FK Inđija on 4 December 2010.
