= Ognjen Mudrinski =

Serbian footballer (born 1991)

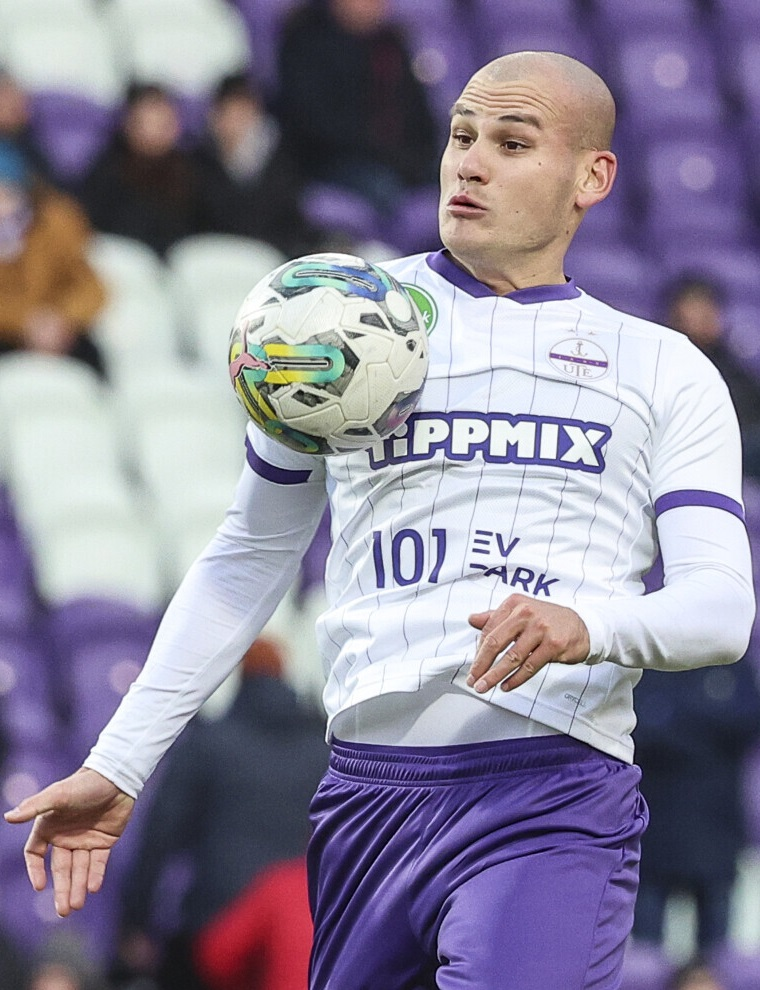
- Mudrinski playing for Újpest in 2023

Personal information
- Date of birth: 15 November 1991 (age 34)
- Place of birth: Srbobran, SR Serbia, Yugoslavia
- Height: 1.87 m (6 ft 2 in)
- Position: Striker

Team information
- Current team: Dubočica
- Number: 91

Youth career
- Srbobran
- Vojvodina

Senior career*
Years	Team	Apps	(Gls)
2009–2011	Vojvodina	7	(2)
2010	→ Hajduk Kula (loan)	2	(0)
2011	→ Novi Sad (loan)	7	(0)
2011–2012	Jagodina	30	(9)
2012–2013	Red Star Belgrade	23	(11)
2013–2014	Greuther Fürth	14	(3)
2014–2015	Aarau	12	(0)
2016–2017	Spartak Subotica	46	(18)
2017–2019	Čukarički	55	(25)
2019–2022	Jagiellonia Białystok	12	(1)
2020–2021	→ Gorica (loan)	39	(13)
2021	Jagiellonia Białystok II	1	(1)
2021–2022	→ Maribor (loan)	27	(17)
2022	Lamphun Warriors	13	(0)
2023	Újpest	9	(3)
2023–2024	Spartak Subotica	27	(2)
2024	Mladost Novi Sad	10	(1)
2025–	Dubočica	12	(1)

International career
2012	Serbia U21	4	(1)
- * Club domestic league appearances and goals as of 1 December 2025

Ognjen Mudrinski (Serbian Cyrillic: Огњен Мудрински; born 15 November 1991) is a Serbian professional footballer who plays as a striker for Dubočica.

== Club career ==
=== Vojvodina ===
Mudrinski began playing football in Vojvodina's youth academy. He scored a goal on his professional debut for the club from Novi Sad at the age of 18 in a match against OFK Beograd on 11 April 2010. However, after being loaned out to various clubs, Mudrinski signed for Jagodina in August 2011. He was quoted saying that "Vojvodina didn't give me a real chance."

=== Jagodina ===
Mudrinski made his debut for Jagodina at the age of 19 in a match against OFK Beograd on 20 August 2011. While this time he did not score on his debut, by the end of the 2011–12 season he became the eighth most prolific scorer in the entire league by scoring a total of nine goals. He made his first appearances in UEFA competition at the age of 20 in July 2012 when he played in both legs of his club's elimination by FC Ordabasy in the 2012–13 UEFA Europa League qualifying phase.

=== Red Star Belgrade ===
Mudrinski signed for Red Star Belgrade in August 2012. In advance of his promotion to the club, he had chosen the number 91 to represent the team's historic win against Olympique Marseille in the 1991 European Cup Final. On 2 September 2012, he scored a hat-trick against Radnički Niš on his debut for Red Star, becoming the first player in club history to do so. After he played in postponed first fixture match against Javor Ivanjica, Mudrinski collected 16 caps in 15 fixtures in the first half of the season. However, by the end of the 2012–13 season, Red Star coach Ricardo Sá Pinto told Mudrinski that he would not be relying on him in the following season.

=== Greuther Fürth and Aarau ===
On 8 July 2013, Mudrinski signed a three-year contract with SpVgg Greuther Fürth for an alleged €800,000. Playing for the club, Mudrinski collected 14 caps in the 2013–14 season in 2. Bundesliga, also making an appearance in DFB-Pokal and one in the play-off. After he made just one appearance, scoring a goal in DFB-Pokal match against SV Waldkirch at the beginning of the 2014–15 season, Mudrinski moved to Switzerland. On 28 August 2014, Mudrinski signed a one-year contract with FC Aarau.

=== Spartak Subotica ===
In January 2016, Mudrinski signed a two-year contract with Spartak Subotica. For the spring half of the 2015–16 Serbian SuperLiga season, Mudrinski played 13 league matches, mostly as a back-up option, and scored 2 goals. He also played two cup rounds, scoring two goals in a match against his former club Jagodina. Mudrinski started the 2016–17 season as the first choice striker. After the first half-season, he promoted himself as the best team scorer with nine goals at total. In April 2017, Mudrinski extended his contract with the club for another year.

=== Čukarički ===
On 25 July 2017, Mudrinski signed a three-year contract with Čukarički, with his transfer from Spartak Subotica costing €200,000. He made his debut for Čukarički in a 2–0 victory over Napredak Kruševac on 29 July 2017. On 25 August 2017, he scored his first goal in a league match with FK Rad, which Čukarički won 1–0 away. On 1 October 2017, Mudrinski was injured during a match against Partizan after a tackle by Everton Luiz. Mudrinski returned to the field in a friendly match against Bečej on 24 January 2018. On 18 March 2018, Mudrinski was sent-off in a 3–3 draw against Javor Ivanjica, three minutes after scoring a goal. Shortly before, he had replaced Marko Docić.

== International career ==
Mudrinski has played for the Serbia national under-21 football team. On 25 October 2012, the Football Association of Serbia suspended Mudrinski and Nikola Ninković from playing in all national teams for one year due to incidents at the under-21 international against England in Kruševac on 16 October.

== Career statistics ==
As of 20 July 2019

Appearances and goals by club, season and competition
Club	Season	League			National cup		Continental		Other		Total	
Club	Season	Division	Apps	Goals	Apps	Goals	Apps	Goals	Apps	Goals	Apps	Goals
Vojvodina	2009–10	Serbian SuperLiga	6	2	0	0	0	0	—		6	2
Vojvodina	2010–11	Serbian SuperLiga	1	0	0	0	—		—		1	0
Vojvodina	2011–12	Serbian SuperLiga	0	0	—		0	0	—		0	0
Vojvodina	Total		7	2	0	0	0	0	—		7	2
Hajduk Kula (loan)	2010–11	Serbian SuperLiga	2	0	0	0	—		—		2	0
Novi Sad (loan)	2010–11	Serbian First League	7	0	—		—		—		7	0
Jagodina	2011–12	Serbian SuperLiga	27	9	2	2	—		—		29	11
Jagodina	2012–13	Serbian SuperLiga	3	0	—		2	0	—		5	0
Jagodina	Total		30	9	2	2	2	0	—		34	11
Red Star Belgrade	2012–13	Serbian SuperLiga	23	11	2	1	—		—		25	12
Greuther Fürth	2013–14	2. Bundesliga	14	3	1	0	—		1 (Note: Appearance(s) in promotion play-offs)	0	16	3
Greuther Fürth	2014–15	2. Bundesliga	0	0	1	1	—		—		1	1
Greuther Fürth	Total		14	3	2	1	—		1	0	17	4
Aarau	2014–15	Swiss Super League	12	0	3	—	—		15	0		
Spartak Subotica	2015–16	Serbian SuperLiga	13	2	2	2	—		—		15	4
Spartak Subotica	2016–17	Serbian SuperLiga	33	16	1	1	—		—		34	17
Spartak Subotica	2017–18	Serbian SuperLiga	0	0	—		—		—		0	0
Spartak Subotica	Total		46	18	3	3	—		—		49	21
Čukarički	2017–18	Serbian SuperLiga	21	7	3	1	—		—		24	8
Čukarički	2018–19	Serbian SuperLiga	34	18	2	0	—		—		36	18
Čukarički	Total		55	25	5	1	—		—		60	26
Jagiellonia Białystok	2019–20	Ekstraklasa	1	0	0	0	—		—		1	0
Career total			207	68	15	7	2	0	1	0	217	76

== Honours ==
Maribor

- Slovenian PrvaLiga: 2021–22

Individual

- Serbian SuperLiga Team of the Season: 2018–19
- Slovenian PrvaLiga Player of the Year: 2021–22
- Slovenian PrvaLiga top scorer: 2021–22
- Maribor Player of the Year: 2021
