= Filip Vasiljević =

Serbian association football player

Personal information
- Date of birth: 5 October 2002 (age 24)
- Place of birth: Požega, FR Yugoslavia
- Height: 1.72 m (5 ft 8 in)
- Position: Midfielder

Team information
- Current team: Grafičar Beograd
- Number: 13

Youth career
- –2020: Red Star Belgrade

Senior career*
Years	Team	Apps	(Gls)
2020–2021	Red Star Belgrade	0	(0)
2020–2021	→ Grafičar Beograd (loan)	7	(0)
2021–	Grafičar Beograd	156	(0)

International career^{‡}
2023–	Serbia U21	1	(0)
- * Club domestic league appearances and goals as of 14 May 2026 ‡ National team caps and goals as of 28 March 2023

Filip Vasiljević (Serbian Cyrillic: Филип Васиљевић; born 5 October 2002) is a Serbian footballer who plays as a midfielder for Grafičar Beograd.

== Career statistics ==
As of 21 February 2021

Club	Season	League			Cup		Continental		Other		Total	
Club	Season	Division	Apps	Goals	Apps	Goals	Apps	Goals	Apps	Goals	Apps	Goals
Grafičar Beograd (loan)	2020–21	Serbian First League	7	0	0	0	—		0	0	7	0
Career total			7	0	0	0	0	0	0	0	7	0
