= List of Serbia international footballers born outside Serbia =

This page is about the Serbia national football team, who had some players (who had at least one cap) born outside Serbia. Some of this players also played for Serbia and Montenegro. To be in the list, players must have one cap for Serbia. Players with caps for Serbia and Montenegro but without caps for Serbia born outside Serbia are not included in the list. Players in bold are currently representing the Serbian team.

== List of players ==
As of 13 November 2026

=== Belgium ===
City	Player	Caps	Goals	Career	Notes	Ref.
Sint-Truiden	**Kristijan Belić**	2	0	2024–		
Antwerp	**Mile Svilar**	1	0	2021–	He represented Belgium at youth level.	

=== Bosnia and Herzegovina ===
City	Player	Caps	Goals	Career	Notes	Ref.
Banja Luka	**Srđan Babić**	14	2	2022–		
Ugljevik	**Željko Gavrić**	1	0	2021–		
Trebinje	**Stefan Gudelj**	1	0	2026–	He represented Bosnia and Herzegovina at youth level.	
Bijeljina	**Dejan Joveljić**	11	2	2021–		
Zvornik	**Nemanja Jović**	1	0	2021–		
Pale	Ognjen Koroman	36	1	2002–2007	Born while the country was part of the SFR Yugoslavia.	
Zenica	Mladen Krstajić	59	2	1999–2008	Born while the country was part of the SFR Yugoslavia. He represented Serbia and Montenegro and Serbia internationally during his career.	
Bijeljina	Savo Milošević	102	37	1994–2008	Born while the country was part of the SFR Yugoslavia. He represented Serbia and Montenegro and Serbia internationally during his career.	
Gradiška	Ognjen Ožegović	1	0	2016		
Bijeljina	**Mihailo Ristić**	9	0	2016–		
Banja Luka	Neven Subotić	36	1	2009–2013	Born while the country was part of the SFR Yugoslavia. He represented USA at youth level.	
Banja Luka	Veseljko Trivunović	6	1	2010–2011	Born while the country was part of the SFR Yugoslavia.	

=== Croatia ===
City	Player	Caps	Goals	Career	Notes	Ref.
Pula	**Danijel Aleksić**	2	0	2008–2018	Born while the country was part of the SFR Yugoslavia.	
Knin	Jovan Damjanović	3	0	2011	Born while the country was part of the SFR Yugoslavia.	
Šibenik	Ivan Ergić	11	0	2006–2008	Born while the country was part of the SFR Yugoslavia.	
Vukovar	**Milan Gajić**	2	0	2021–		
Vinkovci	Danijel Ljuboja	19	1	2003–2006	Born while the country was part of the SFR Yugoslavia. He represented Serbia and Montenegro and Serbia internationally during his career.	

=== France ===
City	Player	Caps	Goals	Career	Notes	Ref.
Montpellier	**Stefan Džodić**	2	0	2026–		

=== Germany ===
City	Player	Caps	Goals	Career	Notes	Ref.
Offenbach am Main	**Sava-Arangel Čestić**	2	0	2021–		
Berlin	**Lazar Samardžić**	31	1	2023–	He represented Germany at youth level	
Nürtingen	**Jan-Carlo Simić**	6	0	2024–		

=== Italy ===
City	Player	Caps	Goals	Career	Notes	Ref.
Milan	**Aleksandar Stanković**	10	1	2025–		
Rome	**Filip Stanković**	2	0	2026–		

=== Kosovo ===
City	Player	Caps	Goals	Career	Notes	Ref.
Mitrovica	Milan Biševac	19	0	2006–2014	Born while the country was part of the SFR Yugoslavia	
Leposavić	**Đorđe Jovanović**	4	0	2022–	Born while the country was part of the FR Yugoslavia	
Mitrovica	Miloš Krasić	46	3	2006–2011	Born while the country was part of the SFR Yugoslavia	
Mitrovica	**Nemanja Miletić**	3	0	2018–	Born while the country was part of the SFR Yugoslavia	
Gjilan	Aleksandar Paločević	1	0	2017	Born while the country was part of the FR Yugoslavia	
Leposavić	Miroslav Vulićević	3	0	2008–2014	Born while the country was part of the SFR Yugoslavia	

=== Montenegro ===
City	Player	Caps	Goals	Career	Notes	Ref.
Ivangrad	Stefan Babović	4	0	2007–2008		
Danilovgrad	Petar Škuletić	6	1	2015		

=== Spain ===
City	Player	Caps	Goals	Career	Notes	Ref.
Lleida	**Sergej Milinković-Savić**	59	9	2017–		
Ourense	**Vanja Milinković-Savić**	24	0	2021–		

=== Sweden ===
City	Player	Caps	Goals	Career	Notes	Ref.
Kalmar	Milan Smiljanić	6	1	2007–2008		

=== Switzerland ===
City	Player	Caps	Goals	Career	Notes	Ref.
Thun	Zdravko Kuzmanović	50	6	2007–2014	He represented Switzerland at youth level.	
St. Gallen	**Aleksandar Prijović**	13	2	2017–2019	He represented Switzerland at youth level.	
Zürich	Alen Stevanović	3	0	2012–2013		
Basel	**Miloš Veljković**	39	1	2017–	He represented Switzerland at youth level.	

== List by country ==
Country	Total	Notes
Bosnia and Herzegovina	12	5 players born in the SFR Yugoslavia
Kosovo	6	4 players born in the SFR Yugoslavia, 2 in the FR Yugoslavia
Croatia	5	4 players born in the SFR Yugoslavia
Switzerland	4	
Germany	3	
Belgium	2	
Italy	2	
Montenegro	2	
Spain	2	
France	1	
Sweden	1	
