= Dimitrije Šarić =

Serbian footballer (born 2008)

Personal information
- Full name: Dimitrije Šarić
- Date of birth: 4 November 2008 (age 17)
- Place of birth: Belgrade, Serbia
- Height: 1.88 m (6 ft 2 in)
- Position: Winger

Team information
- Current team: Red Star Belgrade
- Number: 55

Youth career
- Šarić Football School
- Red Star Belgrade

Senior career*
Years	Team	Apps	(Gls)
2025–	Red Star Belgrade	9	(2)

International career^{‡}
2022	Serbia U15	3	(0)
2024	Serbia U16	3	(0)
- * Club domestic league appearances and goals as of 30 August 2026 ‡ National team caps and goals as of 15:27, 4 June 2026 (UTC)

Dimitrije Šarić (Serbian Cyrillic: Димитрије Шарић; born 4 November 2008) is a Serbian professional footballer who plays as a winger or attacking midfielder for Red Star Belgrade in the Serbian SuperLiga.

== Club career ==
Born in Zemun, Belgrade, Šarić began his footballing education at the academy run by his father before joining the youth set-up at Red Star Belgrade. Coming through the academy, he initially played on the wings before being repositioned as an attacking midfielder.

In the 2025–26 UEFA Youth League, Šarić scored two goals and recorded two assists as Red Star's under-19 side defeated Shakhtar feeder club Banyk 4–1 in the second leg, sealing progression to the next round where they faced Žilina. His performances attracted interest from scouts from clubs across Italy, Belgium and the Netherlands.

Šarić made his senior debut on 20 December 2025 in Serbian SuperLiga round 20, coming on as a substitute against FK Mladost Lučani under head coach Vladan Milojević. Shortly afterwards he suffered a meniscus injury during training and underwent surgery, sidelining him for approximately one month.

Following his recovery, Šarić rejoined the first team under new head coach Dejan Stanković and scored twice during a 5–0 friendly victory over FK Obilić from Zmajevo in March 2026 during the international break.

== Personal life ==
Šarić comes from a footballing family. His father Dejan Šarić is a former professional footballer who captained FK Zemun and later ran his own football academy, where Dimitrije took his first steps in the sport. His older brother Marko Šarić is also a professional footballer.

== Career statistics ==
As of match played 30 August 2026

Appearances and goals by club, season and competition
Club	Season	League			Cup		Europe		Other		Total	
Club	Season	Division	Apps	Goals	Apps	Goals	Apps	Goals	Apps	Goals	Apps	Goals
Red Star Belgrade	2025–26	Serbian SuperLiga	6	0	0	0	—		—		6	0
Red Star Belgrade	2026–27	Serbian SuperLiga	3	2	0	0	0	0	—		3	2
Career total			9	2	0	0	0	0	0	0	9	2
