= Serbian Football Coach of the Year =

Serbian Football Coach of the Year (Serbian: Српски тренер године, Srpski trener godine) is an annual award given from Football Association of Serbia to the best football coach of the year. Originally it has been awarded the Football Association of Serbia and Montenegro. On the same occasion is also given an award for Serbian Player of the Year.

== Winners ==
Year	Coach of the Year	Club / Nation
2005	Ilija Petković	Serbia and Montenegro national football team
2006	Ljubiša Tumbaković	(China) Shandong Luneng
2007	Miroslav Đukić	Partizan; Serbia national football team
2008	Slaviša Jokanović	(Serbia) Partizan (2)
2009	Radomir Antić	Serbia national football team (2)
2010	Milovan Rajevac	Ghana national football team
2011	Ivan Jovanović	(Cyprus) APOEL
2012	Dragan Okuka	(China) Jiangsu Sainty
2013	Ljubinko Drulović	Serbia national under-19 football team
2014	Radovan Ćurčić	Serbia national under-21 football team
2015	Veljko Paunović	Serbia national under-20 football team
2016	Dragan Stojković	(China) Guangzhou Evergrande
2017	Vladan Milojević	(Serbia) Red Star
2018	Vladan Milojević (2)	(Serbia) Red Star (2)
2019	Siniša Mihajlović	(Italy) Bologna
2020	Not awarded	
2021	Dragan Stojković (2)	Serbia national football team (3)
2022	Dragan Stojković (3)	Serbia national football team (4)
2023	Dragan Stojković (4)	Serbia national football team (5)
2024	Vladan Milojević (3)	(Serbia) Red Star (3)
2025	Lidija Stojkanović	Serbia women's national football team
