= RFK Grafičar Beograd =

Association football club in Belgrade, Serbia

Coordinates: 44.790028°N 20.441542°E

Grafičar Beograd
- Full name: Radnički fudbalski klub Grafičar Beograd
- Nickname: The Violets
- Founded: 20 May 1922
- Ground: South artificial grass No. 5 field of - Rajko Mitić Stadium
- Capacity: 1,000
- Chairman: Slobodan Govedarica
- Coach: Nikola Trajković
- League: Serbian First League
- 2025–26: Serbian First League, 10th
- Website: fkgraficar.com
Home colours	Away colours

RFK Grafičar Beograd (Serbian Cyrillic: РФК Графичар Београд) is a football club based in Senjak, Belgrade, Serbia. It competes in Serbian First League, the second tier of Serbian football. The club serves as a reserve team of Red Star Belgrade.

Grafičar has a reputation as an old traditional Belgrade club. Initially, it was financed by the printing industry of major city publishers of books, magazines and newspapers. In 2017, Grafičar became affiliated with Red Star Belgrade. As the feeder team, its primary role is developing Red Star's young players. Red Star's financial backing enabled the club to be quickly promoted from one league to another. The club is currently competing in Serbian First League, the second tier of Serbian football.

== History ==
It is located in Belgrade's suburb called Senjak. The club colour is purple (violet), which is why their fans are called Violet Boys. Some of the club most notable former players are Goran Bunjevčević, Đorđe Svetličić, Dragan Pantelić, Nemanja Vučićević, László Köteles, Milutin Sredojević, Vladimir Rodić. Boris Sekulić who became Slovak international, played in the club in season 2009–10.

=== Recent league history ===
Season	Division	P	W	D	L	F	A	Pts	Pos
2020–21	Serbian First League	34	13	12	9	46	34	51	7th
2021–22	Serbian First League	30	10	5	15	44	42	35	11th
2022–23	Serbian First League	30	15	5	10	57	38	50	3rd
2023–24	Serbian First League	30	11	9	10	43	42	42	8th
2024–25	Serbian First League	30	11	10	9	39	38	43	7th

== Players ==
=== First-team squad ===
As of 8 September 2026

Note: Flags indicate national team as defined under FIFA eligibility rules; some limited exceptions apply. Players may hold more than one non-FIFA nationality.

No.	Pos.	Nation	Player
1	GK	SRB	Savo Radanović (dual registration with Red Star Belgrade)
2	DF	SRB	Strahinja Baucal (dual registration with Red Star Belgrade)
3	DF	SRB	Bratislav Marić
4	DF	SRB	Stefan Hajdin
5	DF	SRB	Petar Golubović
6	MF	SRB	Vasilije Subotić (on loan from Red Star Belgrade)
7	MF	SRB	Luka Bijelović
8	MF	SRB	Luka Nikolić
9	FW	SRB	Nikola Furtula
12	DF	SRB	Matej Strika (dual registration with Red Star Belgrade)
13	MF	SRB	Filip Vasiljević (captain)
14	MF	SRB	Slavoljub Srnić
15	DF	SRB	Darko Lazić (vice-captain)
17	MF	SRB	Ognjen Matanović (dual registration with Red Star Belgrade)

No.	Pos.	Nation	Player
19	DF	SRB	Balša Papović (on loan from Red Star Belgrade)
22	GK	AUT	Nikola Ćuruvija
23	MF	SRB	Uroš Đorđević (on loan from Red Star Belgrade)
27	DF	SRB	Vuk Roganović (on loan from Red Star Belgrade)
33	DF	SRB	Ivan Lakićević
44	DF	SRB	Matija Popović
60	MF	SRB	Dimitrije Šarić (dual registration with Red Star Belgrade)
77	MF	SRB	Dragan Anokić (on loan from Red Star Belgrade)
78	MF	CAN	Joshua Sora Tucker
80	MF	SRB	Marko Živanović
88	DF	MKD	Gorazd Ristovski (on loan from Red Star Belgrade)
92	GK	SRB	Veljko Vojvodić
99	FW	NGR	Prince Benjamin Obasi (on loan from OFK Beograd)

==== Players with multiple nationalities ====
- (Serbia) (Bosnia and Herzegovina) Savo Radanović
- (Serbia) (Bosnia and Herzegovina) Matej Strika
- (Serbia) (Croatia) Petar Golubović
- (Serbia) (Croatia) Stefan Hajdin
- (Serbia) (Hungary) Luka Bijelović
- (Serbia) (Norway) Balša Papović
- (North Macedonia) (Serbia) Gorazd Ristovski
- (Austria) (Serbia) Nikola Ćuruvija
- (Canada) (Japan) Joshua Sora Tucker

=== Out on loan ===
Note: Flags indicate national team as defined under FIFA eligibility rules; some limited exceptions apply. Players may hold more than one non-FIFA nationality.

No. / Pos. / Nation / Player; — / MF / SRB / Veljko Ilić (at Borac 1926 until the end of the 2026–27 season)	No. / Pos. / Nation / Player; — / MF / SRB / Saša Storebra (at Zvezdara until the end of the 2026–27 season)

=== Coaching staff ===
Position	Name
Head coach	(Serbia) Nikola Trajković
Assistant coach	(Serbia) Vladimir Kovačević (Montenegro) Nikola Vujadinović
Goalkeeping coach	(Serbia) Đorđe Topalović
Fitness coach	(Serbia) Miloslav Fabok
Doctor	(Serbia) Dragan Đorđević
Analyst:	(Serbia) Milan Milenković
Physiotherapist	(Serbia) Saša Đorđević (Serbia) Radomir Tadić (Serbia) Slobodan Sekešan
Economic	(Serbia) Aleksandar Der (Serbia) Miloš Matejić
Secretary of the coaching staff	(Serbia) Aleksa Negić

== Historical list of coaches ==
- (Serbia) Uroš Kalinić (2017–2018)
- (Serbia) Milija Žižić (2018–2020)
- (Serbia) Radomir Koković (2021)
- (North Macedonia) Boško Gjurovski (2021)
- (Serbia) Marko Neđić (2021–2026)
- (Serbia) Milan Stegnjaić (2026)
- (Serbia) Nikola Trajković (2026–present)
