= Savo Radanović =

Serbian footballer (born 2009)

Personal information
- Full name: Savo Radanović
- Date of birth: 28 February 2009 (age 17)
- Place of birth: Trebinje, Bosnia and Herzegovina
- Height: 1.95 m (6 ft 5 in)
- Position: Goalkeeper

Team information
- Current team: Red Star Belgrade
- Number: 50

Youth career
- –2023: Leotar
- 2023–2024: Loznica
- 2024–: Red Star Belgrade

Senior career*
| Years | Team | Apps | (Gls) |
| 2025– | Red Star Belgrade | 6 | (0) |
| 2025– | → Grafičar (dual) | 25 | (0) |

International career^{‡}
| 2023 | Bosnia and Herzegovina U15 | 4 | (0) |
| 2024– | Serbia U17 | 16 | (0) |
| 2025 | Serbia U16 | 2 | (0) |
- * Club domestic league appearances and goals as of 26 October 2026 ‡ National team caps and goals as of 29 March 2026

Savo Radanović (Serbian Cyrillic: Саво Радановић, born 28 February 2009) is a professional footballer who plays as a goalkeeper for Red Star Belgrade. Born in Bosnia and Herzegovina, he most recently played for the Serbia U17s.

== Career ==
=== Red Star Belgrade ===
Radanović started playing football at the local Leotar school in his native Trebinje. At the 2024 summer he arrived at the Red Star Belgrade youth school as one of the most talented young goalkeepers. In 2024, the tall goalkeeper got his chance on the big stage, when he played in the 2024–25 UEFA Youth League against Monaco U19 and showed that he is a real asset for the future of Red Star Belgrade. He stood in goal for the youth team in matches against Stuttgart U19, AC Milan U19, as well as in the duel with Barcelona U19, when he stood out with great saves and was the youngest player on the field at only 15 years old.

On 8 November 2024, Radanović extended his contract with Red Star Belgrade until 2027.

On 3 January 2025, Radanović was promoted to the first team from Red Star U-17.

On 12 January 2025, Radanović made his debut for the first team in a friendly match against Surkhon Termez.

On 2 March 2025 Radanović made his official debut for the Red Star Belgrade first team in the Serbian SuperLiga, in a 4:0 win over IMT, two days after his sixteenth birthday. Thus, he became the youngest footballer to officially appear in that competition and the youngest player in the club's history.

== International career ==
Having passed the selective gatherings, Radanović received an invitation to the pioneering national team of Bosnia and Herzegovina. He defended at the "Josip Katalinski-Škija" International Memorial Tournament in 2023, which the Bosnia and Herzegovina U15 team opened with a victory over the age-matched Čelik Zenica selection. After the end of the tournament, the national team of Bosnia and Herzegovina was declared its winner. Radanović was invited to that selection until the end of the same calendar year, and he also played at the UEFA Development Tournament held in Tallinn. In September 2024, he was invited to the gathering of the cadet national team of that country. However, at the beginning of the qualifying cycle of matches for the UEFA European Under-17 Championship, in early November, he responded to the invitation of the selector of the Serbia U17 national team, Radoslav Batak. On that occasion, he also made his debut, performing at meetings with the selections of Bulgaria U17 and Turkey U17.

== Career statistics ==
As of match played 8 August 2026

Appearances and goals by club, season and competition
| Club | Season | League | | | Cup | | Europe | | Other | | Total | |
| Club | Season | Division | Apps | Goals | Apps | Goals | Apps | Goals | Apps | Goals | Apps | Goals |
|---|---|---|---|---|---|---|---|---|---|---|---|---|
| Red Star Belgrade | 2024–25 | Serbian SuperLiga | 2 | 1 | — | | — | | — | | 2 | 1 |
| Red Star Belgrade | 2025–26 | Serbian SuperLiga | 0 | 0 | 0 | 0 | 0 | 0 | 0 | 0 | 0 | 0 |
| Red Star Belgrade | 2026–27 | Serbian SuperLiga | 2 | 0 | 0 | 0 | 0 | 0 | — | | 2 | 0 |
| Red Star Belgrade | Total | | 4 | 1 | 0 | 0 | 0 | 0 | 0 | 0 | 4 | 1 |
| Grafičar (dual) | 2025–26 | Serbian SuperLiga | 27 | 0 | 3 | 0 | — | | — | | 30 | 0 |
| Career total | | | 31 | 1 | 3 | 0 | 0 | 0 | 0 | 0 | 34 | 1 |
