= Matej Strika =

Serbian footballer (born 2009)

Personal information
- Full name: Matej Strika
- Date of birth: 20 August 2009 (age 17)
- Place of birth: Banja Luka, Bosnia and Herzegovina
- Height: 1.84 m (6 ft 0 in)
- Position: Left-back

Team information
- Current team: Red Star Belgrade
- Number: 27

Youth career
- Željezničar Banja Luka
- Red Star Belgrade

Senior career*
Years	Team	Apps	(Gls)
2026–	Red Star Belgrade	7	(0)
2026	→ Grafičar (dual)	5	(0)

International career^{‡}
2023	Serbia U15	3	(0)
2024–2025	Serbia U16	7	(1)
2025–	Serbia U17	14	(0)
- * Club domestic league appearances and goals as of 26 October 2026 ‡ National team caps and goals as of 15 July 2026

Matej Strika (Serbian Cyrillic: Матеј Стрика; born 20 August 2009) is a Serbian professional footballer who plays as a left-back for Red Star Belgrade in the Serbian SuperLiga.

== Club career ==
Strika was born in Banja Luka, where he trained football in the local Željezničar Banja Luka. He stayed there until he was 12 years old, but in the meantime, at the age of ten, he started traveling to Belgrade where he trained with Red Star Belgrade. Later, he joined the younger categories of that club, with which he signed a professional contract in June 2025. During the winter break in the 2025/26 season. He was promoted from the cadet team to the youth team under coach Nenad Milijaš together with Strahinja Baucal. Shortly after the winter preparations, in accordance with the established Rulebook, (Note: According to the Rulebook on the Cooperation of Football Clubs, it implies the right of a young football player to play for a contracted club in a lower level of competition in parallel with the parent club, a member of the Serbian SuperLiga. A possible member of the Serbia U21 national football team is considered a young player. The maximum number of such home club players is limited to 10, up to 5 in the same contracted club. In the second club, only the first team is allowed, not for the younger categories. Although colloquially called dual registration, previously existing, according to this Rulebook, footballers are registered only for the parent club.) he was assigned to the team of Grafičar for the competition in the Serbian First League. After playing in the cadet and youth leagues of Serbia, as well as the first senior matches in the Graficar jersey, he joined the first team of Crvena Zvezda as a sixteen-year-old and wore the number 27 jersey. He made his debut in the last round of the Serbian SuperLiga for the 2025–26 Serbian SuperLiga season, when he entered the game in the final match against OFK Beograd. One minute after entering the game, he assisted to Bruno Duarte for the only goal of Red Star Belgrade in the game that ended with a score of 1:2. He went through the summer training with the first team under the guidance of coach Dejan Stanković and as a result of Adem Avdić's injury, he imposed himself as the first replacement for Nair Tiknizyan in the position of left-back. At the same time, according to his age, he fulfilled the requirement for a football player's bonus in the Serbian SuperLiga the competitive season 2026–27. (Note: "Bonus player" is in the proposals of the competition for the 2026/27 season. In the Serbian SuperLiga and Serbian First League, defined as a citizen of the Republic of Serbia born on January 1, 2004 and later. The same document instructs clubs to have at least two such players on the field at all times, except in cases of exclusion or injury without the right to substitute.)

== International career ==
In November 2023, he participated in the UEFA Development Tournament with the Serbia national under-15 football team. A year later, he made his debut for the Serbia national under-16 football team in a double match with his peers from Bulgaria national under-16 football team. In the second of the games, he was the scorer in Serbia's victory. During the spring of the following year, under the leadership of Igor Matić, he played in the "Miljan Miljanić" Memorial Tournament and the UEFA Development Tournament. He made his debut for the Serbia national under-17 football team at the tournament in Porto, and later participated in the 2026 UEFA European Under-17 Championship qualification for the 2026 UEFA European Under-17 Championship. With the Serbian team, he did not qualify for the final tournament, but with the victory over Switzerland national under-17 football team in the last round of qualification, he won participation in the 2026 FIFA U-17 World Cup in Qatar.

== Career statistics ==
As of match played 15 October 2026

Appearances and goals by club, season and competition
Club	Season	League			Serbian Cup		Europe		Total	
Club	Season	Division	Apps	Goals	Apps	Goals	Apps	Goals	Apps	Goals
Grafičar (loan)	2025–26	Serbian SuperLiga	5	0	0	0	—		5	0
Red Star Belgrade	2025–26	Serbian SuperLiga	2	0	0	0	1 (Note: Appearance in UEFA Europa League)	0	3	0
Career total			7	0	0	0	1	0	8	0

== Honours ==
Red Star

- Serbian SuperLiga: 2025–26

== Literature ==
- Фудбал, број 14 (PDF). Football Association of Serbia. 2023. COBISS 107563532
- Фудбал, број 14 (PDF). Football Association of Serbia. 2024.
- Фудбал, број 12 (PDF). Football Association of Serbia. 2026.
