= Vladimir Dišljenković =

Ukrainian-Serbian footballer

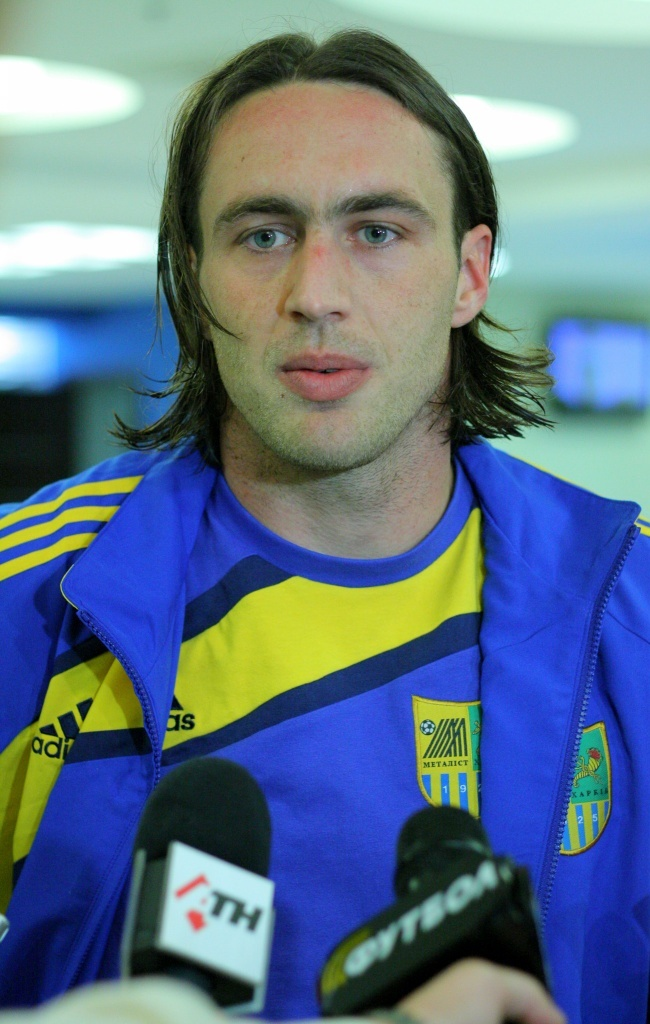

Personal information
- Full name: Vladimir Dišljenković
- Date of birth: July 2, 1981 (age 45)
- Place of birth: Belgrade, SFR Yugoslavia
- Height: 1.88 m (6 ft 2 in)
- Position: Goalkeeper

Senior career*
| Years | Team | Apps | (Gls) |
| 1998–2004 | Red Star Belgrade | 58 | (0) |
| 1999–2000 | → Napredak Kruševac (loan) | 1 | (0) |
| 2000–2001 | → Hajduk Beograd (loan) | 30 | (0) |
| 2005–2010 | Metalurh Donetsk | 89 | (0) |
| 2010–2015 | Metalist Kharkiv | 55 | (0) |
| Total | | 233 | (0) |

International career
| 2004–2009 | Serbia (Note: Including 1 cap for Serbia and Montenegro) | 7 | (0) |
Medal record
| Silver medal – second place | UEFA Under-21 Championship | 2004 |
- * Club domestic league appearances and goals

Vladimir Dišljenković (Serbian Cyrillic: Владимир Дишљенковић, Ukrainian: Владімір Дішленкович; born July 2, 1981) is a Ukrainian-Serbian retired footballer who played as a goalkeeper.

== International career ==
On the national level, Dišljenković played one match for the Serbia and Montenegro national football team (against Norway) and 6 more for Serbia in 2008 and 2009. His final international was a World Cup qualification loss away against Lithuania.

== Personal life ==
Having played in Ukraine for six years, Dišljenković will no longer be considered a foreign player while playing in Ukraine since he obtained Ukrainian citizenship on March 2, 2010, although he had to revoke his Serbian passport.
