= Stefan Gudelj =

Serbian footballer (born 2006)

Personal information
- Full name: Stefan Gudelj
- Date of birth: 18 May 2006 (age 20)
- Place of birth: Trebinje, Bosnia and Herzegovina
- Height: 1.94 m (6 ft 4 in)
- Position: Centre-back

Team information
- Current team: Red Star Belgrade
- Number: 45

Youth career
- FK Leotar
- 2018–2019: Red Star Belgrade
- 2019–2021: FK Čukarički
- 2021–2022: Red Star Belgrade
- 2021–2022: → FK Čukarički (loan)
- 2022–2024: FK Čukarički
- 2024–2025: Red Star Belgrade

Senior career*
| Years | Team | Apps | (Gls) |
| 2025– | Red Star Belgrade | 18 | (1) |
| 2025–2026 | → Grafičar Beograd (dual) | 25 | (0) |

International career^{‡}
| 2021 | Bosnia and Herzegovina U16 | | (0) |
| 2025– | Serbia U21 | 2 | (0) |
| 2026– | Serbia | 3 | (0) |
- * Club domestic league appearances and goals as of 21 November 2026 ‡ National team caps and goals as of 16 November 2026

Stefan Gudelj (Serbian Cyrillic: Стефан Гудељ; born 18 May 2006) is a Serbian professional footballer who plays as a centre-back for Red Star Belgrade in the Serbian SuperLiga. Born in Bosnia and Herzegovina, he represents the Serbia national team.

== Club career ==
Gudelj was born in Trebinje, Bosnia and Herzegovina, and began his football career at hometown club FK Leotar. Scouts from Red Star Belgrade identified him at the age of 12, and he subsequently joined the Red Star academy, with a brief spell at FK Čukarički before returning.

Originally deployed as a midfielder, Gudelj was later repositioned as a centre-back, where he developed into one of the most promising young defenders in the Red Star academy. He captained the club's youth team and featured for Red Star's under-19 side in the UEFA Youth League.

In May 2025, Gudelj signed his first professional contract with Red Star Belgrade, tying him to the club until June 2029. He was subsequently loaned to FK Grafičar Beograd, Red Star's development club competing in the Serbian First League, for the 2025–26 season, where he made 22 league appearances. His performances on loan earned him a call-up to the first team for the winter preparations in January 2026, under new head coach Dejan Stanković, and he subsequently earned a place in the senior squad.

== International career ==
Gudelj previously represented Bosnia and Herzegovina at youth level, but ceased accepting call-ups after 2021. In March 2025, he received his first call-up to the Serbia under-19 side. He was subsequently called up to the Serbia under-21 team in March 2026 for a friendly against Kyrgyzstan.

On 4 October 2026, Gudelj made his debut for the Serbia national team in a 2026–27 UEFA Nations League A game against Netherlands.

== Career statistics ==
=== Club ===
As of match played 15 October 2026

Appearances and goals by club, season and competition
| Club | Season | League | | | Cup | | Europe | | Other | | Total | |
| Club | Season | Division | Apps | Goals | Apps | Goals | Apps | Goals | Apps | Goals | Apps | Goals |
|---|---|---|---|---|---|---|---|---|---|---|---|---|
| Red Star Belgrade | 2025–26 | Serbian SuperLiga | 6 | 0 | — | | — | | — | | 6 | 0 |
| Red Star Belgrade | 2026–27 | Serbian SuperLiga | 9 | 1 | 0 | 0 | 1 (Note: Appearance in UEFA Conference League) | 0 | — | | 10 | 1 |
| Red Star Belgrade | Total | | 15 | 1 | 0 | 0 | 1 | 0 | — | | 16 | 1 |
| Grafičar Beograd (dual) | 2025–26 | Serbian SuperLiga | 25 | 0 | 3 | 0 | — | | — | | 28 | 0 |
| Career total | | | 40 | 1 | 3 | 0 | 1 | 0 | 0 | 0 | 44 | 1 |

=== International ===
As of match played 16 November 2026

Appearances and goals by national team and year
| National team | Year | Apps | Goals |
|---|---|---|---|
| Serbia | 2026 | 3 | 0 |
| Total | | 3 | 0 |
