= Vasilije Subotić =

Serbian footballer (born 2008)

Personal information
- Full name: Vasilije Subotić
- Date of birth: 5 January 2008 (age 18)
- Place of birth: Belgrade, Serbia
- Height: 1.80 m (5 ft 11 in)
- Position: Winger

Team information
- Current team: Red Star Belgrade
- Number: 91

Youth career
- 2023–2026: Red Star Belgrade

Senior career*
Years	Team	Apps	(Gls)
2026–	Red Star Belgrade	1	(0)

International career^{‡}
2023	Serbia U15	2	(0)
2024	Serbia U16	3	(1)
2026–	Serbia U18	1	(0)
- * Club domestic league appearances and goals as of 15:14, 4 June 2026 (UTC) ‡ National team caps and goals as of 15:14, 4 June 2026 (UTC)

Vasilije Subotić (Serbian Cyrillic: Василије Суботић; born 5 January 2008) is a Serbian professional footballer who plays as a winger for Red Star Belgrade in the Serbian SuperLiga.

== Club career ==
Subotić was born in Belgrade and joined Red Star Belgrade's pioneer (under-15) academy at the age of 15 in 2023, progressing through every youth category at the club. He is capable of playing on either flank and is noted for his pace, dribbling and football intelligence.

During the international break in March 2026, Subotić was called up to train with the first team by head coach Dejan Stanković, who publicly singled him out as a player who had stood out from the group. He made his senior debut in round 29 of the Serbian SuperLiga against FK Radnik Surdulica, coming on as a substitute. Following his debut, Subotić extended his contract with the club until June 2028.

== International career ==
Subotić has represented Serbia at youth level, making two appearances for the Serbia under-16 side in 2024, scoring one goal.
