= Serbia national under-17 football team =

National association football team

Serbia U17
- Nickname: Kadeti
- Association: Football Association of Serbia
- Confederation: UEFA (Europe)
- Head coach: Igor Matić
- Captain: Savo Radanović
- Most caps: Nikola Dragičević (32)
- Top scorer: Dejan Joveljić (7)
- FIFA code: SRB
| First colours | Second colours |

First international
- (Socialist Federal Republic of Yugoslavia) Yugoslavia 1–0 Bulgaria (Zaječar, Yugoslavia; 28 October 1980) as Serbia; Serbia 2–0 Malta (17 November 2006)

Biggest win
- Serbia 12–0 Gibraltar (Paphos, Cyprus; 4 November 2022)

Biggest defeat
- (Socialist Federal Republic of Yugoslavia) Yugoslavia 1–5 West Germany (Heilbronn, West Germany; 3 May 1984) (Federal Republic of Yugoslavia) FR Yugoslavia 1–5 Israel (Ashkelon, Israel; 4 March 1997) (Federal Republic of Yugoslavia) FR Yugoslavia 1–5 Spain (Nakskov, Denmark; 1 May 2002) Records are for competitive matches only

FIFA U-17 World Cup
- Appearances: 1 (first in 2026)

European U-16/U-17 Championship
- Appearances: 19 (first in 1982)
- Best result: Runners-up: 1990

The Serbia national under-17 football team represents Serbia in international football at this age level and is controlled by the Football Association of Serbia, the governing body for football in Serbia.

== Competitive record ==
=== FIFA U-17 World Cup record ===
| Year | Round | GP | W | D* | L | GS | GA |
|---|---|---|---|---|---|---|---|
FIFA Under-16 World Championship
| (China) 1985 | Part of Yugoslavia | | | | | | |
| (Canada) 1987 | Part of Yugoslavia | | | | | | |
| (Scotland) 1989 | Part of Yugoslavia | | | | | | |
| (Italy) 1991 | Part of Yugoslavia | | | | | | |
FIFA Under-17 World Championship
| (Japan) 1993 | Part of Federal Republic of Yugoslavia (1992-2003), Serbia and Montenegro (2003-2006) | | | | | | |
| (Ecuador) 1995 | Part of Federal Republic of Yugoslavia (1992-2003), Serbia and Montenegro (2003-2006) | | | | | | |
| (Egypt) 1997 | Part of Federal Republic of Yugoslavia (1992-2003), Serbia and Montenegro (2003-2006) | | | | | | |
| (New Zealand) 1999 | Part of Federal Republic of Yugoslavia (1992-2003), Serbia and Montenegro (2003-2006) | | | | | | |
| (Trinidad and Tobago) 2001 | Part of Federal Republic of Yugoslavia (1992-2003), Serbia and Montenegro (2003-2006) | | | | | | |
| (Finland) 2003 | Part of Federal Republic of Yugoslavia (1992-2003), Serbia and Montenegro (2003-2006) | | | | | | |
| (Peru) 2005 | Part of Federal Republic of Yugoslavia (1992-2003), Serbia and Montenegro (2003-2006) | | | | | | |
FIFA Under-17 World Cup
| (South Korea) 2007 | Did not qualify | | | | | | |
| (Nigeria) 2009 | Did not qualify | | | | | | |
| (Mexico) 2011 | Did not qualify | | | | | | |
| (United Arab Emirates) 2013 | Did not qualify | | | | | | |
| (Chile) 2015 | Did not qualify | | | | | | |
| (India) 2017 | Did not qualify | | | | | | |
| (Brazil) 2019 | Did not qualify | | | | | | |
| (Peru) ~~2021~~ | Cancelled due to COVID-19 pandemic | | | | | | |
| (Indonesia) 2023 | Did not qualify | | | | | | |
| (Qatar) 2025 | Did not qualify | | | | | | |
| (Qatar) 2026 | In progress | 1 | 1 | 0 | 0 | 2 | 0 |
| (Qatar) 2027 | To be determined | | | | | | |
| (Qatar) 2028 | To be determined | | | | | | |
| (Qatar) 2029 | To be determined | | | | | | |
| Total:1/21 | TBD | 1 | 1 | 0 | 0 | 2 | 0 |

=== European U-16/U-17 Championship record ===
| Played as | Year | Round | GP | W | D* | L | GS | GA |
|---|---|---|---|---|---|---|---|---|
| (Socialist Federal Republic of Yugoslavia) YUG/ (Federal Republic of Yugoslavia) FR Yugoslavia | (Italy) 1982 | Third place | 2 | 0 | 1 | 1 | 1 | 2 |
| (Socialist Federal Republic of Yugoslavia) YUG/ (Federal Republic of Yugoslavia) FR Yugoslavia | (West Germany) 1984 | Fourth place | 2 | 0 | 0 | 2 | 1 | 6 |
| (Socialist Federal Republic of Yugoslavia) YUG/ (Federal Republic of Yugoslavia) FR Yugoslavia | (Hungary) 1985 | Group stage | 3 | 1 | 1 | 1 | 2 | 3 |
| (Socialist Federal Republic of Yugoslavia) YUG/ (Federal Republic of Yugoslavia) FR Yugoslavia | (Greece) 1986 | Did not qualify | | | | | | |
| (Socialist Federal Republic of Yugoslavia) YUG/ (Federal Republic of Yugoslavia) FR Yugoslavia | (France) 1987 | Group stage | 3 | 0 | 1 | 2 | 1 | 7 |
| (Socialist Federal Republic of Yugoslavia) YUG/ (Federal Republic of Yugoslavia) FR Yugoslavia | (Spain) 1988 | Group stage | 3 | 0 | 1 | 2 | 1 | 3 |
| (Socialist Federal Republic of Yugoslavia) YUG/ (Federal Republic of Yugoslavia) FR Yugoslavia | (Denmark) 1989 | Group stage | 3 | 2 | 1 | 0 | 4 | 0 |
| (Socialist Federal Republic of Yugoslavia) YUG/ (Federal Republic of Yugoslavia) FR Yugoslavia | (East Germany) 1990 | Runners-up | 5 | 4 | 0 | 1 | 10 | 4 |
| (Socialist Federal Republic of Yugoslavia) YUG/ (Federal Republic of Yugoslavia) FR Yugoslavia | (Switzerland) 1991 | Group stage | 3 | 1 | 0 | 2 | 5 | 7 |
| (Socialist Federal Republic of Yugoslavia) YUG/ (Federal Republic of Yugoslavia) FR Yugoslavia | (Cyprus) 1992 | Group stage | 3 | 2 | 0 | 1 | 4 | 5 |
| (Socialist Federal Republic of Yugoslavia) YUG/ (Federal Republic of Yugoslavia) FR Yugoslavia | (Turkey) 1993 | Did not qualify | | | | | | |
| (Socialist Federal Republic of Yugoslavia) YUG/ (Federal Republic of Yugoslavia) FR Yugoslavia | (Republic of Ireland) 1994 | Withdrew | | | | | | |
| (Socialist Federal Republic of Yugoslavia) YUG/ (Federal Republic of Yugoslavia) FR Yugoslavia | (Belgium) 1995 | Did not qualify | | | | | | |
| (Socialist Federal Republic of Yugoslavia) YUG/ (Federal Republic of Yugoslavia) FR Yugoslavia | (Austria) 1996 | Did not qualify | | | | | | |
| (Socialist Federal Republic of Yugoslavia) YUG/ (Federal Republic of Yugoslavia) FR Yugoslavia | (Germany) 1997 | Did not qualify | | | | | | |
| (Socialist Federal Republic of Yugoslavia) YUG/ (Federal Republic of Yugoslavia) FR Yugoslavia | (Scotland) 1998 | Did not qualify | | | | | | |
| (Socialist Federal Republic of Yugoslavia) YUG/ (Federal Republic of Yugoslavia) FR Yugoslavia | (Czech Republic) 1999 | Did not qualify | | | | | | |
| (Socialist Federal Republic of Yugoslavia) YUG/ (Federal Republic of Yugoslavia) FR Yugoslavia | (Israel) 2000 | Did not qualify | | | | | | |
| (Socialist Federal Republic of Yugoslavia) YUG/ (Federal Republic of Yugoslavia) FR Yugoslavia | (England) 2001 | Did not qualify | | | | | | |
| (Federal Republic of Yugoslavia) FR Yugoslavia/ (Serbia and Montenegro) SCG | (Denmark) 2002 | Quarterfinals | 4 | 2 | 0 | 2 | 10 | 10 |
| (Federal Republic of Yugoslavia) FR Yugoslavia/ (Serbia and Montenegro) SCG | (Portugal) 2003 | Did not qualify | | | | | | |
| (Federal Republic of Yugoslavia) FR Yugoslavia/ (Serbia and Montenegro) SCG | (France) 2004 | Did not qualify | | | | | | |
| (Federal Republic of Yugoslavia) FR Yugoslavia/ (Serbia and Montenegro) SCG | (Italy) 2005 | Did not qualify | | | | | | |
| (Federal Republic of Yugoslavia) FR Yugoslavia/ (Serbia and Montenegro) SCG | (Luxembourg) 2006 | Group stage | 3 | 0 | 1 | 2 | 2 | 7 |
| Serbia | (Belgium) 2007 | Did not qualify | | | | | | |
| Serbia | (Turkey) 2008 | Group stage | 3 | 1 | 1 | 1 | 2 | 1 |
| Serbia | (Germany) 2009 | Did not qualify | | | | | | |
| Serbia | (Liechtenstein) 2010 | Did not qualify | | | | | | |
| Serbia | (Serbia) 2011 | Group stage | 3 | 0 | 1 | 2 | 3 | 7 |
| Serbia | (Slovenia) 2012 | Did not qualify | | | | | | |
| Serbia | (Slovakia) 2013 | Did not qualify | | | | | | |
| Serbia | (Malta) 2014 | Did not qualify | | | | | | |
| Serbia | (Bulgaria) 2015 | Did not qualify | | | | | | |
| Serbia | (Azerbaijan) 2016 | Group stage | 3 | 0 | 1 | 2 | 2 | 5 |
| Serbia | (Croatia) 2017 | Group stage | 3 | 1 | 0 | 2 | 2 | 4 |
| Serbia | (England) 2018 | Group stage | 3 | 0 | 0 | 3 | 0 | 6 |
| Serbia | (Republic of Ireland) 2019 | Did not qualify | | | | | | |
| Serbia | (Estonia) 2020 | Cancelled due to COVID-19 pandemic | | | | | | |
| Serbia | (Cyprus) 2021 | Cancelled due to COVID-19 pandemic | | | | | | |
| Serbia | (Israel) 2022 | Semi-finals | 5 | 2 | 2 | 1 | 7 | 6 |
| Serbia | (Hungary) 2023 | Quarter-finals | 4 | 1 | 1 | 2 | 7 | 8 |
| Serbia | (Cyprus) 2024 | Semi-finals | 5 | 3 | 0 | 2 | 12 | 10 |
| Serbia | (Albania) 2025 | Did not qualify | | | | | | |
| Serbia | (Estonia) 2026 | Did not qualify | | | | | | |
| Serbia | (Latvia) 2027 | To be determined | | | | | | |
| Serbia | (Lithuania) 2028 | To be determined | | | | | | |
| Serbia | (Moldova) 2029 | To be determined | | | | | | |
| Total | | 19/39 | 60 | 20 | 12 | 28 | 66 | 101 |

*Denotes draws include knockout matches decided on penalty kicks.

== Players ==
=== Current squad ===
The following players were called up for the most recent 2026 UEFA European Under-17 Championship qualification matches.

| No. | Pos. | Player | Date of birth (age) | Club |
|---|---|---|---|---|
| 1 | GK | Savo Radanović (captain) | 28 February 2009 (age 17) | (Football Association of Serbia) Red Star Belgrade |
| 12 | GK | Veljko Popović | 5 August 2009 (age 17) | (Football Association of Serbia) Partizan |
| | DF | Mateja Lacmanović | 31 July 2009 (age 17) | (Football Association of Serbia) Red Star Belgrade |
| 5 | DF | Strahinja Baucal | 17 October 2009 (age 17) | (Football Association of Serbia) Red Star Belgrade |
| 6 | DF | Vojin Marinković | 14 February 2009 (age 17) | (Football Association of Serbia) Partizan |
| 14 | DF | Uroš Dragišić | 24 January 2009 (age 17) | (Football Association of Serbia) IMT |
| 15 | DF | Mihajlo Popović | 19 January 2009 (age 17) | (Football Association of Serbia) Red Star Belgrade |
| | DF | Pavle Raković | 20 May 2009 (age 17) | (Football Association of Serbia) Partizan |
| 2 | DF | Vukašin Davidov | 23 April 2009 (age 17) | (Football Association of Serbia) Vojvodina |
| 3 | DF | Matej Strika | 20 August 2009 (age 17) | (Football Association of Serbia) Red Star Belgrade |
| 13 | DF | Andrej Drakulić Neziri | 8 March 2009 (age 17) | (Football Association of Serbia) Vojvodina |
| 4 | MF | Dragan Anokić | 24 November 2009 (age 16) | (Football Association of Serbia) Red Star Belgrade |
| 18 | MF | Vanja Antić | 25 August 2009 (age 17) | (Football Association of Serbia) Čukarički |
| 20 | MF | Adrian Stanković | 7 February 2010 (age 16) | (Austrian Football Association) Rapid Wien |
| 8 | MF | Veljko Pejović | 1 February 2009 (age 17) | (Football Association of Serbia) Vojvodina |
| 10 | MF | Ognjen Matanović | 14 January 2010 (age 16) | (Football Association of Serbia) Red Star Belgrade |
| 17 | FW | Balša Tadić | 8 January 2009 (age 17) | (Football Association of Serbia) Partizan |
| 22 | FW | David Đokić | 8 July 2009 (age 17) | (Football Association of Serbia) Mladost Lučani |
| | FW | Nebojša Grujić | 2 April 2009 (age 17) | (Football Association of Serbia) Čukarički |
| 11 | FW | William Reece Millwood | 7 September 2009 (age 17) | (Football Association of Serbia) Partizan |
| 7 | FW | Danilo Fekete | 10 August 2010 (age 16) | (Football Association of Serbia) Čukarički |
| 9 | FW | Tadija Samardžić | 3 August 2009 (age 17) | (German Football Association) Hertha Berlin |
| 19 | FW | David Vajagić | 1 January 2009 (age 17) | (German Football Association) Wolfsburg |

== Former squads ==
- 2024 UEFA European Under-17 Championship – Serbia
- 2023 UEFA European Under-17 Championship – Serbia
- 2022 UEFA European Under-17 Championship – Serbia
- 2018 UEFA European Under-17 Championship – Serbia
- 2017 UEFA European Under-17 Championship – Serbia
- 2016 UEFA European Under-17 Championship – Serbia
- 2011 UEFA European Under-17 Championship – Serbia
- 2008 UEFA European Under-17 Championship – Serbia
- 2006 UEFA European Under-17 Championship – Serbia and Montenegro
- 2002 UEFA European Under-17 Championship – FR Yugoslavia

== Coaches ==
| Dates | Name |
|---|---|
| 2026– | (Serbia) Igor Matić |
| 2026 | (Serbia) Radovan Krivokapić |
| 2025–2026 | (Serbia) Igor Matić |
| 2024–2025 | (Montenegro) Radoslav Batak |
| 2023–2024 | (Serbia) Jovan Damjanović |
| 2022–2023 | (Serbia) Aleksandar Luković |
| 2021–2022 | (Serbia) Radovan Krivokapić |
| 2019–2021 | (Serbia) Dejan Branković |
| 2018–2019 | (Serbia) Milan Kuljić |
| 2018 | (Serbia) Ivan Jević |
| 2017 | (Serbia) Vladimir Ješić |
| 2017 | (Serbia) Perica Ognjenović |
| 2015–2016 | (Serbia) Ilija Stolica |
| 2014–2015 | (Serbia) Dejan Govedarica |
| 2013–2014 | (Serbia) Branislav Nikolić |
| 2012–2013 | (Serbia) Milan Lešnjak |
| 2011–2012 | (Serbia) Nenad Sakić |
| 2010–2011 | (Serbia) Milovan Đorić |
| 2009–2010 | (Serbia) Branko Vukašinović |
| 2008–2009 | (Serbia) Dušan Šuljagić |
| 2007–2008 | (Serbia) Dejan Đurđević |
| 2006–2007 | (Serbia) Saša Nikolić |
| 2005–2006 | (Serbia and Montenegro) Saša Medin |
| 2005 | (Serbia and Montenegro) Zlatko Krmpotić |
| 2004 | (Serbia and Montenegro) Tomislav Sivić |
| 2003–2004 | (Serbia and Montenegro) Dragan Vujović |
| 2002–2003 | (Federal Republic of Yugoslavia) Miodrag Martać |
| 2001–2002 | (Federal Republic of Yugoslavia) Momčilo Vujačić |
| 1995–2000 | (North Macedonia) Nikica Klinčarski |

== See also ==
- UEFA European Under-17 Championship
- Serbia national football team
- Serbia national under-19 football team
- Serbia national under-21 football team
