= Vladan Milojević =

Serbian footballer and manager (born 1970)

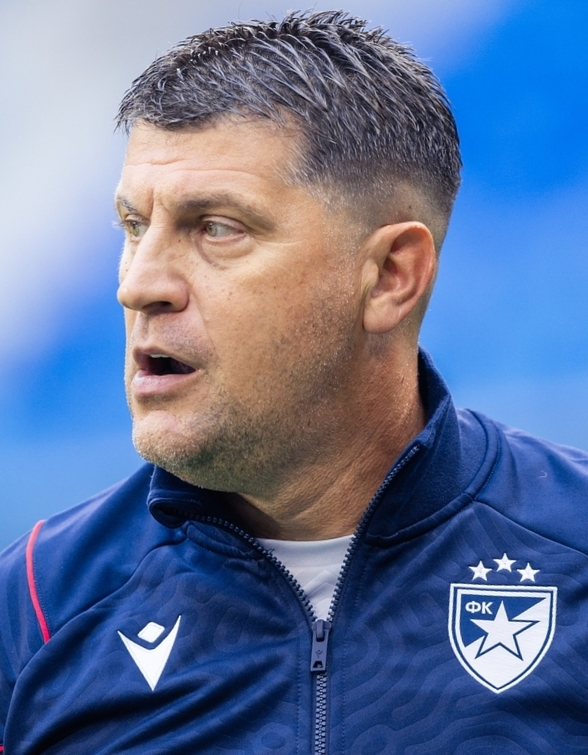
- Milojević with Red Star Belgrade in 2024

Personal information
- Date of birth: 9 March 1970 (age 56)
- Place of birth: Aranđelovac, SR Serbia, SFR Yugoslavia
- Height: 1.82 m (6 ft 0 in)
- Position: Centre-back

Team information
- Current team: Shanghai Shenhua (manager)

Youth career
- 1986–1989: Red Star Belgrade

Senior career*
Years	Team	Apps	(Gls)
1990–1993	Radnički Beograd	57	(10)
1993–1994	PAS Giannina	29	(6)
1994–1995	Kalamata	36	(1)
1996	Red Star Belgrade	13	(0)
1996–1997	Apollon Athens	29	(3)
1997–2000	Panathinaikos	61	(5)
2000–2003	Iraklis	69	(3)
2003	Akratitos	9	(1)
2004	Apollon Smyrnis	11	(0)
Total		314	(29)

Managerial career
- 2006–2007: Čukarički (assistant)
- 2010–2011: Red Star Belgrade (youth)
- 2011: Javor Ivanjica
- 2012–2015: Čukarički
- 2015–2016: Omonia
- 2016–2017: Panionios
- 2017–2019: Red Star Belgrade
- 2020–2021: Al-Ahli
- 2021: AEK Athens
- 2021–2022: Al-Ettifaq
- 2022–2023: APOEL
- 2023: Apollon Limassol
- 2023–2025: Red Star Belgrade
- 2026–: Shanghai Shenhua
- * Club domestic league appearances and goals

Vladan Milojević (Serbian Cyrillic: Владан Милојевић; born 9 March 1970) is a Serbian professional football manager and former player. He is the current manager of Chinese Super League club Shanghai Shenhua.

== Playing career ==
Born in Aranđelovac, Milojević joined the youth system of Red Star Belgrade in 1986, before making his senior debuts with Bečej. He then spent three seasons with Radnički Beograd (1990–1993), playing together with Darko Tešović and Zdenko Muf. In the summer of 1993, Milojević moved to Greece, alongside Muf, and joined PAS Giannina. He also played for Kalamata, again with Muf, before returning to his homeland and joining his parent club Red Star Belgrade in early 1996. Six months later, Milojević returned to Greece and signed with Apollon Athens. He spent one season at the club, before switching to Panathinaikos and remaining there for the next three years. Subsequently, Milojević spent three seasons at Iraklis (2000–2003). He also played at Akratitos for six months, before spending the final six months of his career at his former club Apollon Smyrnis.

== Managerial career ==
After hanging up his boots, Milojević worked in the youth setups at Iraklis and Red Star Belgrade. He won the national championship with the latter's under-18 team in the 2010–11 season. In June 2011, Milojević was appointed manager of Serbian SuperLiga side Javor Ivanjica, but left the club after three months.

In February 2012, Milojević took charge at Serbian First League club Čukarički. He led them to promotion to the top flight in 2013. Two years later, Milojević won his first trophy as a manager when Čukarički defeated Partizan 1–0 in the 2014–15 Serbian Cup final. He left the club by mutual consent in October 2015.

In November 2015, Milojević was appointed manager of Cypriot club Omonia. He left the position in May 2016. In August 2016, Milojević took charge at Greek side Panionios. He parted ways with the club at the end of the season.

In June 2017, Milojević became manager of Red Star Belgrade. He won the league in his first season in charge and led them to the UEFA Europa League knockout stage.

In the 2018–19 season, Milojević became the first manager to lead Red Star Belgrade to the UEFA Champions League group stage, having survived three qualifying rounds to eventually beat FC Red Bull Salzburg in the playoff round by 2–2 on aggregate. Red Star Belgrade caused one of the biggest upsets of that UEFA Champions League season by defeating the later winner of the season Liverpool at home with 2–0.

In the 2019–20 season, Milojević again managed to reach the UEFA Champions League group stage after defeating some tough opponents in the likes of København and Young Boys. On 19 December 2019, Milojevic announced his resignation as manager of Red Star Belgrade even though the team is 11 points clear in the Serbian league.

On 28 February 2020, Milojević signed a 1 1/2–year contract with Saudi Professional League club Al-Ahli.

On 3 June 2021, Milojević signed a 2–year contract with Super League Greece club AEK Athens.

On 17 October 2021, Milojević signed a 2-year contract with Saudi Professional League club Al-Ettifaq. He was sacked on 1 March 2022 with the team sitting in the relegation zone.

On 5 October 2022, Milojević returned to Cyprus, becoming the new manager of Cypriot First Division club APOEL. He left after a second place finish in the 2022–23 season.

On 31 August 2023, Milojević became the manager of another Cypriot club, Apollon Limassol..On 5 December Milojevic resigned as coach due to poor results.

On 22 December 2023 Milojević returned to Red Star Belgrade after 4 years and signed a multi-year contract. After winning two league titles and two Serbian Cups and achieving qualification for the league phase of the 2024-25 UEFA Champions League, Milojevic left Red Star by mutual consent with the club on 21 December 2025.

On 13 August 2026, Milojević became the manager of Chinese Super League club Shanghai Shenhua.

== Personal life ==
Milojević is the father of Greek youth international Nemanja Milojević. He is also the younger brother of fellow manager and former footballer Goran Milojević and uncle of footballer Stefan Milojević.

== Managerial statistics ==
As of match played 12 October 2026

Managerial record by team and tenure
Team	Nat	From	To	Record							
Team	Nat	From	To	P	W	D	L	GF	GA	GD	Win %
Javor Ivanjica	(Serbia)	30 June 2011	26 September 2011	7	3	0	4	6	10	−4	42.86
Čukarički	(Serbia)	1 February 2012	6 October 2015	124	64	32	28	166	104	+62	51.61
Omonia	(Cyprus)	11 November 2015	31 May 2016	33	20	5	8	59	27	+32	60.61
Panionios	(Greece)	11 August 2016	5 June 2017	39	17	9	13	41	32	+9	43.59
Red Star Belgrade	(Serbia)	5 June 2017	19 December 2019	149	106	26	17	317	115	+202	71.14
Al-Ahli	(Saudi Arabia)	28 February 2020	24 March 2021	41	17	6	18	57	65	−8	41.46
AEK Athens	(Greece)	1 July 2021	8 October 2021	7	4	1	2	12	8	+4	57.14
Al-Ettifaq	(Saudi Arabia)	17 October 2021	1 March 2022	14	3	4	7	13	19	−6	21.43
APOEL	(Cyprus)	5 October 2022	30 June 2023	35	21	9	5	56	29	+27	60.00
Apollon Limassol	(Cyprus)	31 August 2023	3 December 2023	12	6	2	4	20	10	+10	50.00
Red Star Belgrade	(Serbia)	20 December 2023	21 December 2025	106	80	12	14	293	103	+190	75.47
Shanghai Shenhua	(China)	13 August 2026	Present	7	4	0	3	20	14	+6	57.14
Total				572	343	106	123	1,062	507	+555	59.97

== Honours ==
=== Player ===
Red Star Belgrade

- FR Yugoslavia Cup: 1995–96

=== Manager ===
Čukarički

- Serbian Cup: 2014–15

Red Star Belgrade

- Serbian SuperLiga: 2017–18, 2018–19, 2023–24, 2024–25
- Serbian Cup: 2023–24, 2024–25

=== Individual ===
- Serbian SuperLiga Manager of the Season: 2017–18, 2018–19
- Serbian Coach of the year: 2017, 2018, 2024
