= Red Star Belgrade =

Association football club in Serbia

Crvena zvezda
- Full name: Фудбалски клуб Црвена звезда Fudbalski klub Crvena zvezda (Red Star Football Club)
- Nickname: Звезда / Zvezda (The Star) Црвено-бели / Crveno-beli (The Red-Whites)
- Short name: CZV, ZVE
- Founded: 4 March 1945; 81 years ago
- Ground: Rajko Mitić Stadium
- Capacity: 51,755
- President: Svetozar Mijailović
- General director: Zvezdan Terzić
- Head coach: Albert Riera
- League: Serbian SuperLiga
- 2025–26: Serbian SuperLiga, 1st of 16 (champions)
- Website: crvenazvezdafk.com
Home colours	Away colours	Third colours

Fudbalski klub Crvena zvezda (Serbian Cyrillic: Фудбалски клуб Црвена звезда, lit. 'Red Star Football Club'), commonly referred to as Crvena zvezda (pronounced [tsř̩ʋenaː zʋěːzda]) and colloquially referred to as Red Star Belgrade in Anglophone media, is a Serbian professional football club based in Belgrade, and a major part of the Red Star multi-sport society.

They are the most successful club from the Balkans and Southeast Europe, being the only club to have won both the European Cup and Intercontinental Cup, having done so in 1991, and only the second team from Eastern Europe to win the European Cup. With 37 national championships, 30 national cups, 2 national supercups, 2 national champions leagues and one league cup between Serbian and Yugoslav competitions, Red Star was the most successful club in Yugoslavia and finished first in the Yugoslav First League all-time table, and is the most successful club in Serbia.

According to 2008 polls, Red Star Belgrade is the most popular football club in Serbia, with 48% of the population supporting them. They have many supporters in other former Yugoslav republics and among the Serb diaspora. Their main rivals are fellow Belgrade side Partizan. The championship matches between these two clubs are known as the Eternal derby.

According to the International Federation of Football History & Statistics' list of the Top 200 European clubs of the 20th century, Red Star is the highest-ranked Serbian and Balkan club, sharing the 27th position.

== History ==
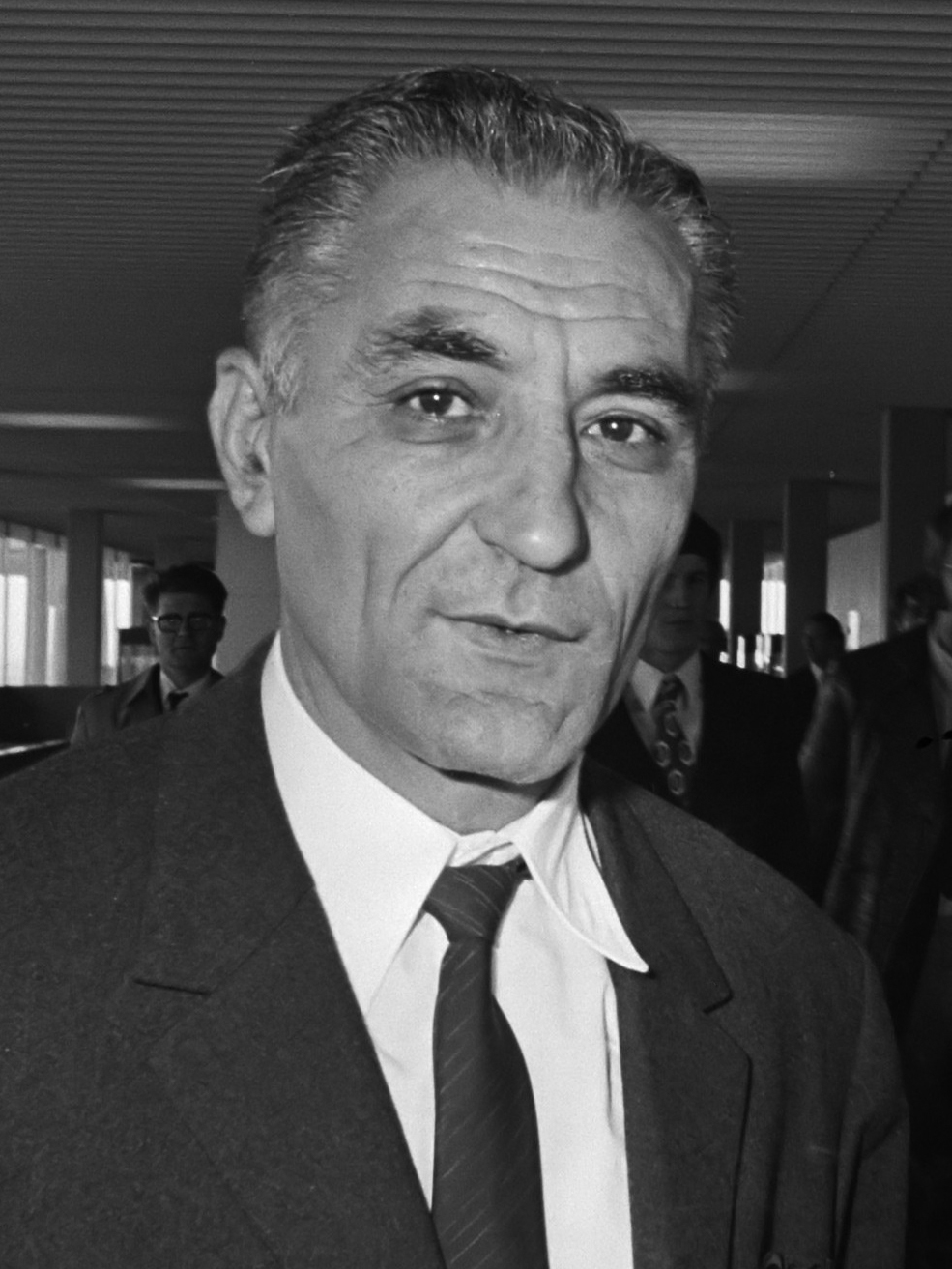
Red Star legend Rajko Mitić.

=== Yugoslavia and Serbia-Montenegro period ===
In February 1945, during World War II, a group of young men, active players, students and members of the Serbian United Antifascist Youth League, decided to form a Youth Physical Culture Society, that was to become Red Star Belgrade on 4 March. Previously, as of December 1944, all pre-war Serbian clubs were abolished, and on 5 May 1945, communist Secretary of Sports Mitra Mitrović-Djilas signed the decree dissolving formally all pre-war clubs on the territory of Socialist Republic of Serbia. The clubs were dissolved because during the German occupation, there was an attempt to organize the league so all the clubs were labelled collaborators by Josip Broz Tito's communist regime.

The name Red Star was assigned after a long discussion. Other ideas shortlisted by the delegates included "People's Star", "Blue Star", "Proleter", "Stalin", "Lenin", etc. The initial vice presidents of the Sport Society – Zoran Žujović and Slobodan Ćosić – were the ones who assigned it. Red Star was soon adopted as a symbol of Serbian nationalism within Yugoslavia and a sporting institution which remains the country's most popular to this day. On that day, Red Star played the first football match in the club's history against the First Battalion of the Second Brigade of KNOJ (People's Defence Corps of Yugoslavia) and won 3–0.

Red Star's first successes involved small steps to recognition. In the first fifteen years of existence, Red Star won one Serbian championship, six Yugoslav championships, five Yugoslav Cups, one Danube Cup and reached the semi-finals of the 1956–57 European Cup. Some of the greatest players during this period were Kosta Tomašević, Branko Stanković, Rajko Mitić, Vladimir Beara, Bora Kostić, Vladica Popović, Vladimir Durković and Dragoslav Šekularac. As champions, Red Star were Yugoslavia's entrants into the 1957–58 European Cup where they were famously beaten 5–4 on aggregate by English champions Manchester United in the quarter-finals. Manchester United, managed by Matt Busby defeated Red Star 2–1 in the first leg in England before drawing 3–3 with them in Yugoslavia in the return match on 5 February at JNA Stadium. The second leg is notable for being the last match played by the Busby Babes: on the return flight to England the following day, the plane crashed in Munich, resulting in the deaths of 23 people, including eight Manchester United players.

Red Star's starting lineup against Borussia in Düsseldorf, 1979 UEFA Cup Final. (coach: Branko Stanković).

During the Miljan Miljanić era, Red Star won four Yugoslav championships, three Yugoslav cups, two Yugoslav supercups, one Yugoslav league cup, one Mitropa Cup and reached the semi-finals of the 1970–71 European Cup. A new generation of players emerged under Miljanić's guidance, led by Dragan Džajić and Jovan Aćimović. Red Star eliminated Liverpool in the second round of the 1973–74 European Cup and Real Madrid in the quarter-finals of the 1974–75 European Cup Winners' Cup. Branko Stanković, whose reign as head coach was to last four years, brought Red Star three trophies and the first great European final. After eliminating teams like Arsenal, West Bromwich Albion and Hertha BSC, Red Star made for the first time the UEFA Cup final. There, Red Star met Borussia Mönchengladbach, who played five European finals from 1973 to 1980. The Germans fell behind one goal from Miloš Šestić, but Ivan Jurišić's own goal gave Gladbach a psychological advantage before the rematch. This game was played at the Rheinstadion in Düsseldorf, where the Italian referee Alberto Michelotti gave a questionable penalty to the Germans, and the Danish player Allan Simonsen sealed Red Star's fate. The Foals won 2–1 on aggregate.

After the 1970s, historical matches against Udo Lattek's Barcelona followed during the 1982–83 European Cup Winners' Cup. In both matches, Barcelona were the better team and Red Star was eliminated. Remarkably, when Barça's Diego Maradona scored his second goal in front of approximately 100,000 spectators at the Marakana, the Belgrade audience were so excited about the goal that even the loyal Belgrade fans applauded Maradona. Gojko Zec returned to the team in 1983, finding only one player from the champions generation he was coaching back in 1977, Miloš Šestić. Zec similarly repeated the club's triumph from his previous mandate by winning the championship immediately upon his arrival. Zec would later leave the club in a controversial Šajber's case-style scandal which was the result of irregularities in the 1985–86 season.

Red Star's starting lineup against Marseille in 1991 European Cup Final. (coach: Ljupko Petrović).

After Zec left in 1986, there were great changes in the club. The management of the club, run by Dragan Džajić and Vladimir Cvetković, began to build a team that could compete with some of the most powerful European sides. During that summer, Velibor Vasović became coach and the side was strengthened by acquiring a number of talented young players, among whom Dragan Stojković and Borislav Cvetković stood out. In the first season that started with penalty points, Red Star focused on the European Cup and achieving good results. In 1986, a five-year plan was developed by the club and Prof. Dr Veljko Aleksić with the only goal being to win the European Cup. All that was planned was finally achieved. On the club's birthday in 1987, it started. Real Madrid were defeated at the Marakana. From that day through to March 1992, Red Star enjoyed the best period of success in its history. In these five seasons, Red Star won four National Championships; in the last of those four years of heyday, the club won the 1991 European Cup Final, played in Bari, Italy.

Red Star coach Ljupko Petrović brought the team to Italy a week before the final in order to peacefully prepare the players for a forthcoming encounter with Marseille. By that time, Red Star had 18 goals in 8 matches, whereas the French champions had 20. Therefore, the 100th European competing final was expected to be a spectacle of offense. Nonetheless, both Petrović and Raymond Goethals opted for defence and the match settled down into a war of attrition. After a 120-minute match and only few chances on both sides, the match was decided following the penalty shootout. After several minutes of stressful penalties, one of Marseille's players, Manuel Amoros, missed a penalty, and Darko Pančev converted his penalty to bring the European Cup to Yugoslavia for the first time. Red Star won the shootout, 5–3, on 29 May 1991 in front of 60,000 spectators and the millions watching on television around the world. Twenty-thousand Red Star fans at the Stadio San Nicola and millions of them all over Yugoslavia and the world celebrated the greatest joy in Red Star's history. Red Star went unbeaten at the 1990–91 European Cup in Bari and the 1991 Intercontinental Cup in Tokyo.

In 1992, the club was weakened by the departure of numerous players from the champions generation (new players were added, such as Dejan Petković and Anto Drobnjak). The success in the previous season caught the attention of European giants which rushed making lucrative offers to sign Red Star's best players. In addition, Red Star had to defend the continental trophy playing its home games in Szeged, Budapest and Sofia due to the war in former Yugoslavia, thereby reducing their chances of defending their title. UEFA changed the format of the competition that year and the 1991–92 European Cup was the first to be played in a format with two groups each having four teams. Despite the disadvantage of playing its home games abroad, Red Star still did well and finished second in the group behind Sampdoria. In domestic competition, main rivals Hajduk Split and Dinamo Zagreb left the league, just as all the other clubs from Croatia, Macedonia and Slovenia did, and the championship in Yugoslavia that was cut in size was played on the edge of observance of regulations around the beginning of the Bosnian War. At the end of May, the United Nations had the country under sanctions and dislodged Yugoslav football from the international scene. The Breakup of Yugoslavia, the Yugoslav Wars, the inflation and the UN sanctions have hit Red Star hard. In the period between May 1992 and May 2000, only one championship victory was celebrated at the Marakana. However, they did manage to win five cups, along with several glorious European performances, including the famed 1996 UEFA Cup Winners' Cup showdown against Barcelona side which featured Ronaldo and Hristo Stoichkov.

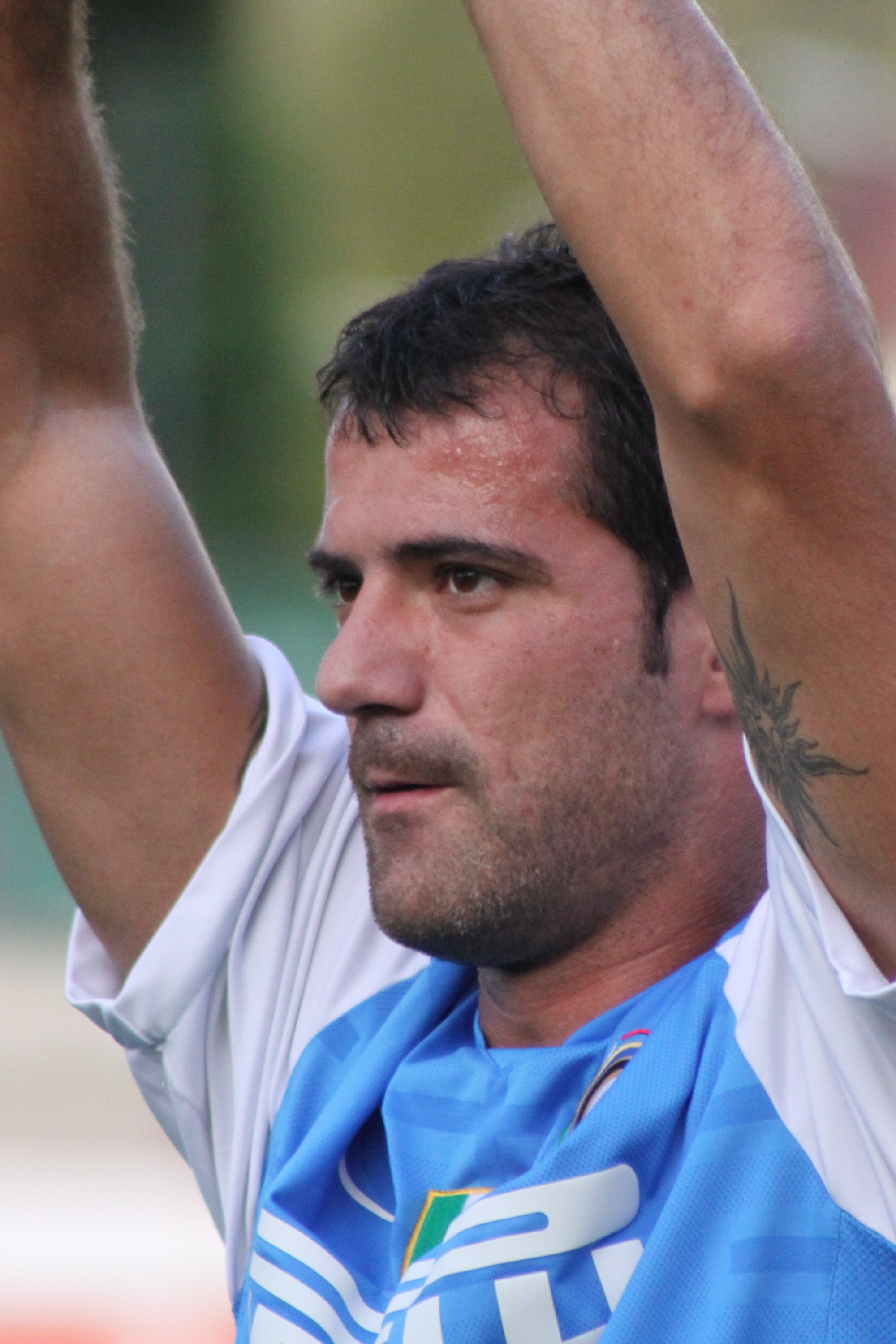
Dejan Stanković was the youngest captain ever in Red Star's history.

Immediately after the NATO bombing of Yugoslavia ended, Red Star won the 17th cup in its history by winning 4–2 against Partizan. Two seasons later, the club returned to the European spotlight by making it to the 2001–02 UEFA Champions League qualifying rounds, where Red Star was eliminated by Bayer Leverkusen (0–0 and 0–3), which would later be a finalist in the Champions League that year. Slavoljub Muslin left the bench in September 2001, after which Red Star's subsequent seasons became more volatile.

=== Recent era ===
In the 2006–07 UEFA Champions League qualifying rounds, Red Star was eliminated (3–1 on aggregate) by the same Milan side which ultimately won that year's competition. Furthermore, the campaign in Group F of the 2007–08 UEFA Cup was a large disappointment, especially given that the first game against Bayern Munich was a sensational last-minute loss (by a score of 2–3 in Belgrade). In those years, Red Star's teams featured the likes of Nikola Žigić, Boško Janković, Milan Biševac, Dušan Basta, Dejan Milovanović, Segundo Castillo, Ibrahima Gueye, Nenad Milijaš and Ognjen Koroman. After a six-year drought, Red Star won their 26th league title in 2013–14 season.

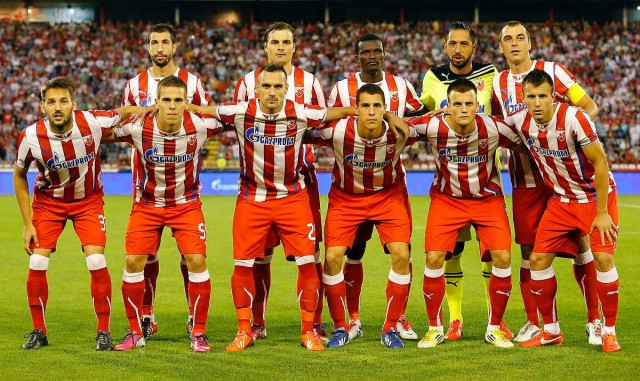
Crvena zvezda in 2013.

Despite Red Star's success on the pitch in 2013–14, the financial situation at the club has worsened, so much so that the club were banned from participating in the 2014–15 UEFA Champions League for which they qualified by winning the Serbian SuperLiga. The UEFA Club Financial Control Body found Red Star's debts to players, some of whom had not been paid for at least six months, staff and other clubs, totalled €1.86 million. The club board were also alleged to have hidden debts and falsified documents. This, on top of an earlier UEFA disciplinary measure in 2011, meant Red Star did not meet the necessary Club Licensing and Financial Fair Play criteria and, as such, should not have been granted a UEFA license by the Serbian FA. Rivals Partizan took Red Star's place in the UEFA Champions League second qualifying round.

After ten years of waiting, Red Star qualified for the 2017–18 UEFA Europa League group stage. Red Star progressed through four qualifying rounds and reached the knockout phase of the tournament, becoming the first team in competition's history to reach the knockout phase after starting their season in the first qualifying round. Although Red Star played in the group stage of the first edition in which groups format was introduced in the European Cup, 1991–92 European Cup, the designation "Champions League" was only adopted a season later in which Yugoslav clubs were already banned from participating in. Thus, when Red Star eliminated Red Bull Salzburg in the 2018–19 UEFA Champions League play-off round, and qualified for the UEFA Champions League group stage, it meant that Red Star competed for the first time since the new format was introduced. Red Star became the first Serbian team to win a match in the UEFA Champions League when they defeated Liverpool.

On 14 May 2019, the 1946 People's Republic of Serbia League title was officially recognized by the Serbian FA, meaning that Red Star's triumph in the 2018–19 Serbian SuperLiga was their 30th national championship. Red Star reached the UEFA Champions League group stage for the second successive season after eliminating Sūduva, HJK Helsinki, Copenhagen and Young Boys. On 5 November 2019, cable television channel Zvezda TV started airing.

In the 2020–21 Serbian SuperLiga, Red Star set a world record for the number of points gained in a single season with 108 points. Red Star won their ninth Serbian SuperLiga title in a row and completed their sixth consecutive double in the 2025–26 season.

== Crest and colours ==
Red Star adopted the iconic red and white vertical stripe jersey in 1950.

Red Star initially wore yellow shirts with a red star which were acquired from FK Slavija (from Čubura). In 1946, the club switched to red shirts with white shorts and alternating red-white socks before adopting the signature red and white vertical striped shirts, with alternating white or red shorts and socks in 1950. The red and white stripes have become indivisible to Red Star's image, conferring the popular nickname Crveno-beli, "the red and white's" in Serbian. The club continued to wear the initial pre-stripe kit throughout its existence, but has generally declined in usage. During the 1950s and 1960s, the club also alternated between blue trunks, a long white V-neck on a red shirt, and a red shirt with thin white horizontal lines.

Red Star have usually worn an all-white away kit, whilst also utilizing predominantly blue or red away or third kits, thereby incorporating the Serbian tricolour. The club crest is a red five-pointed star, white framed, on a red-white background. In addition, the whole crest is framed in gold. There are three golden stars on the top of the club emblem, symbolizing the 30 titles won.

Despite the club's overtly Communist name and imagery, Red Star Football Club has become a symbol in its own right. The "petokraka" from which the club's name derives has paradoxically become a symbol of the club itself, moving further away from its original association with the Partisans and the Communist Party of Yugoslavia. Due to Red Star's popularity and sporting success, the club and its crest have become synonymous with broader Serbian identity, and patriotism that echoes beyond the sporting landscape.

== Stadium ==
Red Star's home ground is the Rajko Mitić Stadium (since 21 December 2014), formerly known as Red Star Stadium. With a seated capacity of 51,755 it is the largest stadium in Serbia and in the former Yugoslavia. The stadium was opened in 1963, and in the course of time and due to the fact that stadium's former capacity was about 110,000, it got the unofficial moniker Marakana, after the large and famous Maracanã Stadium in Rio de Janeiro, Brazil, and Belgrade's sold-out Marakana garnered the reputation of being a very tough ground for visiting teams to play in. Some of the biggest football events have been held at this stadium, such as the European Cup final between Ajax and Juventus in 1973, UEFA European Championship final between West Germany and Czechoslovakia in 1976, and the first leg of the UEFA Cup final between Red Star and Borussia Mönchengladbach in 1979. During the mid-1990s, in order to meet UEFA demands for spectators comfort and security, standing places at the stadium were completely done away with and seats were installed on all four stands. In the years, since the stadium's capacity was gradually decreased, followed different stadium modernisations.

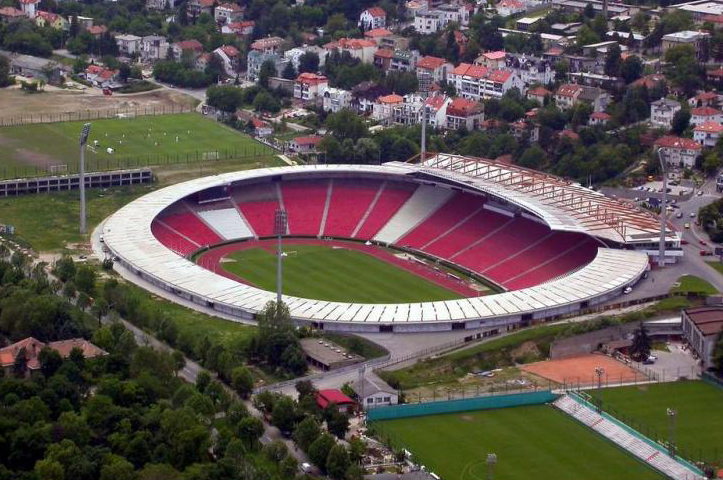
Rajko Mitić Stadium viewed from the air.

In 2008, the club reconstructed the stadium's pitch, under-soil grass heaters, improved drainage systems were installed and new modern turf replaced the old surface. The training pitch, located next to the stadium, was also renovated by laying down synthetic turf and installing new lighting equipment. In 2011, the stadium received also a new modern LED scoreboard. Today, the stadium has a central lodge, named 5 Zvezdinih Zvezda (English: 5 Stars of Red Star), which consist of five segments, each bears the name of one of Red Star's legendary players (Mitić, Šekularac, Džajić, Petrović, Stojković), two other VIP lounges and a special VIP gallery with over 450 seats. It has also a modern press box with a capacity of 344 seats including seven extra-comfortable seats, an extra media center, the Red Cafe and a restaurant. On the west stand of the stadium exist also an official Red Star shop along with a Delije shop. The playing field measures are 110 × 73 m, and is illuminated by 1,400 lux floodlights. According to the known German Web portal "Stadionwelt", Belgrade's "Marakana" is in the top 50 football stadiums in Europe. In 2012, American Bleacher Report ranked the Red Star Stadium, especially if it is sold out, as among the most intimidating stadiums in the world.

== Youth academy ==
=== History ===
Some of the most notable home-grown players are Dragan Džajić, named the all-time Serbian best player (the choice of the Football Association of Serbia on the 50th anniversary of UEFA, known as the Golden Player), who reached third place at the election for the European Footballer of the Year in 1968, then Dragoslav Šekularac – a runner-up with Yugoslavia at 1960 European Nations' Cup, Vladimir Petrović – the fourth Star of Red Star, Vladimir Jugović – two times the European Cup winner (with Red Star and Juventus), as well as Dejan Stanković and Nemanja Vidić.

Further notable home-grown players include Vladica Popović, Ratomir Dujković, Stanislav Karasi, Slobodan Janković, Ognjen Petrović, Vladislav Bogićević, Dušan Nikolić, Zoran Filipović, Dušan Savić, Milan Janković, Boško and Milko Gjurovski, Stevan Stojanović, Vladan Lukić, Zvonko Milojević, Zoran Jovičić, Ivan Adžić, Nebojša Krupniković, Goran Drulić, Nenad Lalatović, Marko Pantelić, Ognjen Koroman, Vladimir Dišljenković, Marko Perović, Dejan Milovanović, Dragan Mrđa, Boško Janković, Dušan Basta, Vujadin Savić, Slavoljub Srnić, Filip Stojković, Uroš Spajić, Srđan Mijailović, Marko Grujić, Luka Jović, Strahinja Eraković and Vasilije Kostov.

Former Red Star and Real Madrid coaching legend Miljan Miljanić was also a member of Red Star's youth school.

=== Current coaching staff ===
- U19s: (Serbia) Đorđe Rakić
- U17s: (Serbia) Marko Milić

== Supporters ==
Red Star is the most popular football club in Serbia. The club has fans and sympathisers throughout the whole country, but also throughout the regional and global Serbian diaspora, making the club a symbol of Serbdom. Fan groups are widespread throughout Serbia and former Yugoslav republics, and the club has the highest social media following amongst former Yugoslav football teams. Traditionally, Red Star has been represented as the people's club, whilst always attracting support from all social classes, their fan base is not associated with any specific social group. Red Star ultras Delije espouse patriotic, nationalist and right-wing sentiments.

The organized supporters of Red Star are known as Delije, roughly translated in English as the "Heroes", "Braves", "Hardman" or "Studs". The term derives from the plural of the singular form "Delija", in Serbian. Delije support all branches of the Red Star multi-sport society. They are one of the most famous supporter groups in the world, renowned for their passion and fanaticism.

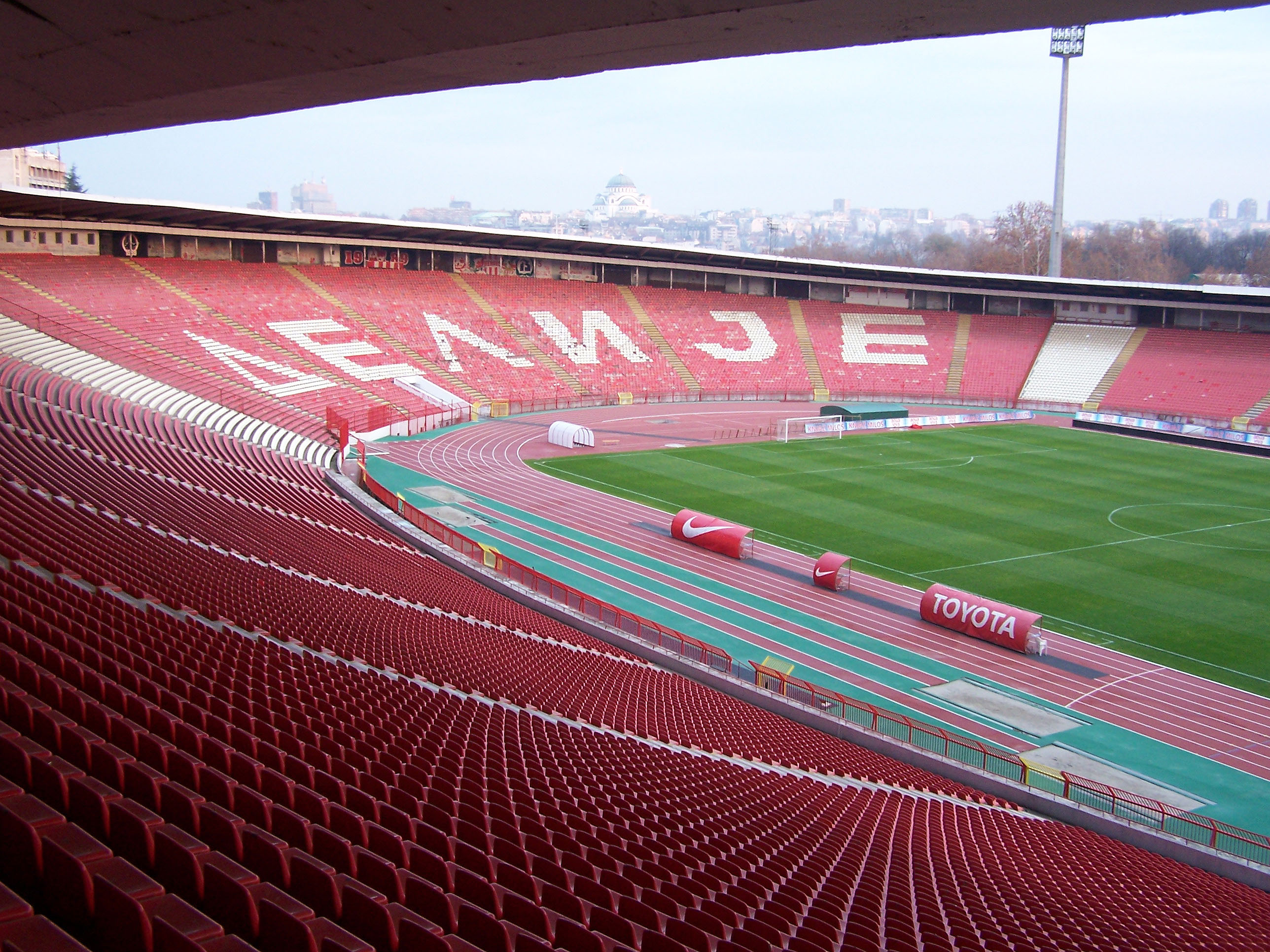
Delije section at Rajko Mitić Stadium.

Hardcore supporters began to emerge during the 1980s, with official inauguration taking place in 1989. Previously, Red Star fans were scattered amongst several organized fan groups within the north terrace of the Rajko Mitić Stadium, colloquially known as "Marakana". Their style of support is greatly influenced by Italian and English football culture of the 1980s. It includes the use of widespread choreography, flares, flags, banners, and boisterous cheering. The word Delije is displayed (in Cyrillic) on the north terrace seats of Rajko Mitić Stadium as a sign of appreciation, and fidelity between the club and supporters. Subgroups of Delije exist outside of Belgrade, along with cities across Serbia and all other ex-Yugoslav republics. Despite Red Star's broad fan base, Delije have developed an infamous reputation for hooliganism amongst some segments of its ultras, especially during Belgrade derbies.

Due to historically warm Serbo-Hellenic relations, Red Star's Delije ultras have developed a strong kinship with Olympiacos ultras Gate 7. The "Orthodox Brothers" friendship is based on mutual Eastern Orthodox faith, a strong cultural marker amongst the Serbs and Greeks. Both clubs also share the same colours, and are from the national capitals. They are also the most decorated football teams in their respective countries. The brotherhood has evolved to include Spartak Moscow ultras Fratria, owing to strong Russophilia and a shared Slavic heritage. Delije also maintain friendship with supporters of Napoli.

== The Eternal derby ==
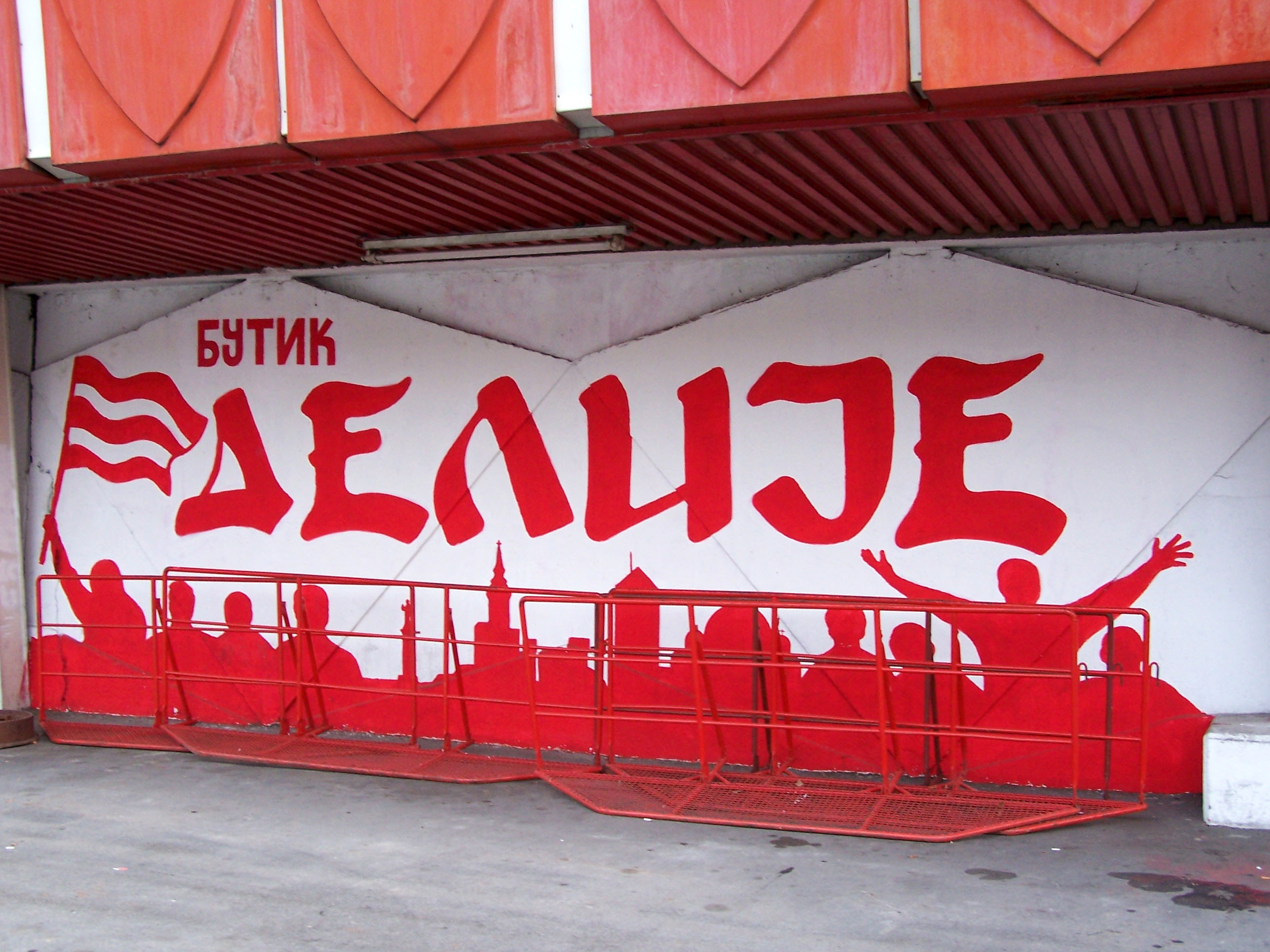
Graffiti of the Delije at Rajko Mitić Stadium.

Red Star's fiercest and long-standing city rival is FK Partizan, football section of the other large and popular multi-sports club in Serbia. The rivalry started immediately after the creation of the two clubs in 1945. Since then, both clubs have been dominant in domestic football. The match is particularly noted for the passion of the Red Star's supporters, called Delije, and Partizan's supporters, the Grobari (English: "Gravediggers" or "Undertakers"). The stands of both teams feature fireworks, coloured confetti, flags, rolls of paper, torches, smoke, drums, giant posters and choreographies, used to create visual grandeur and apply psychological pressure on the visiting teams, hence the slogan, "Welcome to Hellgrade". Both sets of supporters sing passionate songs against their rivals, and the stadiums are known to bounce with the simultaneous jumping of the fans. The duel is regarded as one of the greatest football rivalries in the world and the matches between these rivals have been labeled as the Eternal derby. Given its widespread touch on the entirety of a major city, it is dubbed one of, along with the Old Firm, the Rome derby and the Istanbul derby, the most heated rivalries in European football. The biggest attendance for a Red Star – Partizan match was about 108,000 spectators at the Rajko Mitić Stadium.

== Honours ==
Red Star has won 4 international and 72 domestic trophies, making it the most successful football club in Serbia and the former Yugoslavia.

=== Domestic competitions (72) ===
National Championships – 37 (record)

- People's Republic of Serbia League (record)
  - Winners (1): 1946
- Yugoslav First League (record)
  - Winners (19): 1951, 1952–53, 1955–56, 1956–57, 1958–59, 1959–60, 1963–64, 1967–68, 1968–69, 1969–70, 1972–73, 1976–77, 1979–80, 1980–81, 1983–84, 1987–88, 1989–90, 1990–91, 1991–92
- First League of Serbia and Montenegro
  - Winners (5): 1994–95, 1999–2000, 2000–01, 2003–04, 2005–06
- Serbian SuperLiga (record)
  - Winners (12): 2006–07, 2013–14, 2015–16, 2017–18, 2018–19, 2019–20, 2020–21, 2021–22, 2022–23, 2023–24, 2024–25, 2025–26

National Cups – 30 (record)

- Yugoslav Cup (record)
  - Winners (12): 1948, 1949, 1950, 1957–58, 1958–59, 1963–64, 1967–68, 1969–70, 1970–71, 1981–82, 1984–85, 1989–90
- Serbia and Montenegro Cup (record)
  - Winners (9): 1992–93, 1994–95, 1995–96, 1996–97, 1998–99, 1999–2000, 2001–02, 2003–04, 2005–06
- Serbian Cup (record)
  - Winners (9): 2006–07, 2009–10, 2011–12, 2020–21, 2021–22, 2022–23, 2023–24, 2024–25, 2025–26

National Super Cups – 2 (record)

- Yugoslav Super Cup
  - Winners (2): 1969, 1971

National League Cup – 1 (shared record)

- Yugoslav League Cup
  - Winners (1): 1972–73

National Champions League – 2 (record)

- Yugoslav Summer Champions League
  - Winners (2): 1971, 1973

=== International competitions (4) ===
Red Star is the most successful club from Serbia (and former Yugoslavia) in all European competitions, and the only club from Eastern Europe that has won both the European Cup and the Intercontinental Cup. On 27 October 2017, FIFA officially recognized all winners of the Intercontinental Cup as club world champions, in equal status to the FIFA Club World Cup. The club competed in 63 European seasons, and the most notable results are:

- European Cup / UEFA Champions League
  - Winners (1): 1990–91
- Intercontinental Cup
  - Winners (1): 1991
- UEFA Cup / UEFA Europa League
  - Runners-up (1): 1978–79
- UEFA Super Cup
  - Runners-up (1): 1991
- Mitropa Cup
  - Winners (2): 1958, 1967–68

=== Friendly tournaments (21) ===
- Torneo Internacional de Chile (1): 1962
- Tournoi de Paris (1): 1962
- Trofeo Ibérico (1): 1971
- Teresa Herrera Trophy (1): 1971
- Trofeo Costa del Sol (1): 1973
- Orange Trophy (1): 1973
- Danube Tournament (1): 1976
- World of Soccer Cup (1): 1977
- Lunar New Year Cup (1): 1980
- Belgrade Tournament (2): 1980, 1981
- Trofeo Costa Verde (1): 1982
- YU Tournament (1): 1984
- Mostar Tournament (1): 1991
- Torneo di Verona (1): 1991
- Tournoi de Corse (1): 1995
- Freiburg Tournament (1): 1997
- IFiZ Leipzig (1): 2004
- Chicago Sister Cities International Cup (1): 2010
- PARI Premier Cup (1): 2023
- Winline Summer Cup (1): 2024

=== Individual awards ===
==== Domestic ====
Yugoslav First League top scorers

Season	Name	Goals
1951	(Socialist Federal Republic of Yugoslavia) Kosta Tomašević	16
1953	(Socialist Federal Republic of Yugoslavia) Todor Živanović	17
1959	(Socialist Federal Republic of Yugoslavia) Bora Kostić	25
1960	(Socialist Federal Republic of Yugoslavia) Bora Kostić	19
1969	(Socialist Federal Republic of Yugoslavia) Vojin Lazarević	22
1973	(Socialist Federal Republic of Yugoslavia) Vojin Lazarević	25
1975	(Socialist Federal Republic of Yugoslavia) Dušan Savić	20
1977	(Socialist Federal Republic of Yugoslavia) Zoran Filipović	21
1979	(Socialist Federal Republic of Yugoslavia) Dušan Savić	24
1990	(Socialist Federal Republic of Yugoslavia) Darko Pančev	25
1991	(Socialist Federal Republic of Yugoslavia) Darko Pančev	34
1992	(Socialist Federal Republic of Yugoslavia) Darko Pančev	25

First League of Serbia and Montenegro top scorers

Season	Name	Goals
1993	(Serbia and Montenegro) Anto Drobnjak	22
1997	(Serbia and Montenegro) Zoran Jovičić	21
1998	(Serbia and Montenegro) Saša Marković	27
2004	(Serbia and Montenegro) Nikola Žigić	19
2005	(Serbia and Montenegro) Marko Pantelić	21

Serbian SuperLiga top scorers

Season	Name	Goals
2008	(Serbia) Nenad Jestrović	13
2011	(Serbia) Andrija Kaluđerović	13
2014	(Serbia) Dragan Mrđa	19
2016	(Serbia) Aleksandar Katai	21
2018	(Serbia) Aleksandar Pešić	25
2025	(Senegal) Cherif Ndiaye	19
2026	(Serbia) Aleksandar Katai	24

Yugoslav Footballer of the Year

- (Socialist Federal Republic of Yugoslavia) Vladimir Petrović (1980)
- (Socialist Federal Republic of Yugoslavia) Dragan Stojković (1988)
- (Socialist Federal Republic of Yugoslavia) Dragan Stojković (1989)
- (Socialist Federal Republic of Yugoslavia) Robert Prosinečki (1990)

Sportsperson of the Year in Yugoslavia

- (Socialist Federal Republic of Yugoslavia) Dragan Džajić (1969)
- (Socialist Federal Republic of Yugoslavia) Dejan Savićević (1991)

Serbian SuperLiga Footballer of the Year

- (Serbia) Nenad Milijaš (2009)
- (Portugal) Hugo Vieira (2016)
- (Serbia) Aleksandar Pešić (2018)
- (Germany) Marko Marin (2019)
- (South Korea) Hwang In-beom (2024)
- (Serbia) Aleksandar Katai (2026)

Serbian SuperLiga Young Footballer of the Year

- (Serbia) Strahinja Eraković (2023)
- (Serbia) Vasilije Kostov (2026)

Serbian SuperLiga Coach of the Year

- (Serbia) Vladan Milojević (2025)

Serbian Coach of the Year

- (Serbia) Vladan Milojević (2017)
- (Serbia) Vladan Milojević (2018)
- (Serbia) Vladan Milojević (2024)

==== International ====
Ballon d'Or

- 2nd: (Socialist Federal Republic of Yugoslavia) Darko Pančev (1991)
- 2nd: (Socialist Federal Republic of Yugoslavia) Dejan Savićević (1991)
- 3rd: (Socialist Federal Republic of Yugoslavia) Dragan Džajić (1968)

European Golden Shoe

- (Socialist Federal Republic of Yugoslavia) Darko Pančev (1991)

European Cup top scorer

- (Socialist Federal Republic of Yugoslavia) Borislav Cvetković (1987)

Bravo Award

- (Socialist Federal Republic of Yugoslavia) Robert Prosinečki (1991)

UEFA Jubilee Golden Player

- (Serbia and Montenegro) Dragan Džajić (2003)
- (North Macedonia) Darko Pančev (2003)

UEFA Euro Golden Boot

- (Socialist Federal Republic of Yugoslavia) Dragan Džajić (1968)

UEFA Euro Team of the Tournament

- (Socialist Federal Republic of Yugoslavia) Vladimir Durković (1960)
- (Socialist Federal Republic of Yugoslavia) Dragoslav Šekularac (1960)
- (Socialist Federal Republic of Yugoslavia) Bora Kostić (1960)
- (Socialist Federal Republic of Yugoslavia) Dragan Džajić (1968)

FIFA World Cup All-Star Team

- (Socialist Federal Republic of Yugoslavia) Dragan Stojković (1990)

FIFA World Cup Best Young Player Award

- (Socialist Federal Republic of Yugoslavia) Robert Prosinečki (1990)

FIFA U-20 World Cup Golden Ball

- (Socialist Federal Republic of Yugoslavia) Robert Prosinečki (1987)

FIFA U-20 World Cup Golden Glove

- (Serbia) Predrag Rajković (2015)

== Club records ==
Dragan Džajić is Red Star's record appearance holder with 389 matches. The goalscoring record holder is Bora Kostić with 230 goals. Numerous Red Star players were in the Yugoslavia national team and Branko Stanković, Rajko Mitić, Vladimir Beara, Bora Kostić, Vladimir Durković, Dragoslav Šekularac, Miroslav Pavlović, Jovan Aćimović, Dragan Džajić, Vladimir Petrović, Dragan Stojković and Dejan Savićević are among them. Dragan Džajić played 85 matches for the Yugoslavia national football team, a national record.

Red Star holds records such as to be only the second foreign team that could beat Liverpool at Anfield (after Ferencváros in the 1967–68 Inter-Cities Fairs Cup), which was also the only defeat of Liverpool at home in the European Cup history in the whole 20th century (during the 1973–74 European Cup). Red Star was also the first team that could beat Bayern Munich on the Olympiastadion in its long UEFA competition history (during the 1990–91 European Cup).

They are the only Serbian (and ex-Yugoslav) club, and only the second team from Eastern Europe, to have won the European Cup, having done so in 1991, which was also the 100th UEFA competition final. Red Star is among the nine clubs which have ever won the European Cup unbeaten. They are also the only team from the Balkans and Southeast Europe to have won the Intercontinental Cup, also in 1991. The Romanian football player Miodrag Belodedici was the first ever Red Star player to have won the European Cup with two different teams, Steaua București and Red Star; curiously, both of the team's names mean "Star". Later, double winners were also Dejan Savićević (Red Star and Milan) and Vladimir Jugović (Red Star and Juventus).

=== Top ten most appearances of all-time ===
As of 20 September 2026

Rank.	Player	Period	Apps
1	(Socialist Federal Republic of Yugoslavia) Dragan Džajić	1963–75; 1977–78	389
2	(Socialist Federal Republic of Yugoslavia) Bora Kostić	1951–61; 1962–66	341
3	(Socialist Federal Republic of Yugoslavia) Vladimir Petrović	1972–82	332
4	(Serbia) Aleksandar Katai	2014–16; 2020–	330
5	(Socialist Federal Republic of Yugoslavia) Jovan Aćimović	1965–76	318
6	(Montenegro) Mirko Ivanić	2019–	305
7	(Socialist Federal Republic of Yugoslavia) Boško Gjurovski	1978–89	299
8	(Socialist Federal Republic of Yugoslavia) Rajko Mitić	1945–58	294
8	(Serbia) Milan Rodić	2017–25	294
10	(Socialist Federal Republic of Yugoslavia) Vladica Popović	1953–65	291

=== Top ten scorers of all-time ===
As of 6 September 2026

Rank.	Player	Period	Goals
1	(Socialist Federal Republic of Yugoslavia) Bora Kostić	1951–61; 1962–66	230
2	(Serbia) Aleksandar Katai	2014–16; 2020–	162
3	(Socialist Federal Republic of Yugoslavia) Dragan Džajić	1963–75; 1977–78	155
4	(Socialist Federal Republic of Yugoslavia) Dušan Savić	1973–82	149
5	(Socialist Federal Republic of Yugoslavia) Zoran Filipović	1970–80	138
6	(Socialist Federal Republic of Yugoslavia) Kosta Tomašević	1945–54	137
7	(Socialist Federal Republic of Yugoslavia) Vojin Lazarević	1966–70; 1972–74	134
8	(Socialist Federal Republic of Yugoslavia) Darko Pančev	1988–92	116
9	(Socialist Federal Republic of Yugoslavia) Rajko Mitić	1945–58	109
10	(Montenegro) Mirko Ivanić	2019–	101

=== Club all-time European record ===
Red Star Belgrade	Seasons	Pld	W	D	L	GF	GA	W %
Representing Serbia	20	166	61	42	63	230	229	36.75
Representing Serbia and Montenegro	11	66	26	20	20	109	80	39.39
Representing (Socialist Federal Republic of Yugoslavia) Yugoslavia	33	179	89	30	60	347	235	49.72
Total	64	411	176	92	143	686	544	42.82

Competition	Pld	W	D	L
European Cup / UEFA Champions League	177	78	36	63
UEFA Cup / UEFA Europa League	177	76	44	57
UEFA Conference League	0	0	0	0
UEFA Cup Winners' Cup	34	12	10	12
Inter-Cities Fairs Cup	21	9	2	10
UEFA Super Cup	1	0	0	1
Intercontinental Cup	1	1	0	0
Total	411	176	92	143

As of 27 August 2026

=== UEFA Ranking ===
As of 27 August 2026

Rank	Team	Points
59	(Czech Republic) Sparta Prague	36.250
59	(Azerbaijan) Qarabağ	36.250
61	(Slovakia) Slovan Bratislava	36.000
62	(Serbia) Red Star Belgrade	34.000
63	(Germany) VfB Stuttgart	33.500
64	(Sweden) Djurgården	32.000
65	(Greece) Panathinaikos	31.750

==== Best results in international competitions ====
Season	Achievement	Notes
European Cup / UEFA Champions League
1990–91	Winners	defeated (France) Marseille 0–0 in Bari, 5–3 pen.
1956–57	Semi-finals	lost to (Italy) Fiorentina 0–1 in Belgrade, 0–0 in Firenze
1970–71	Semi-finals	lost to (Greece) Panathinaikos 4–1 in Belgrade, 0–3 in Athens
1991–92	Semi-finals	finished second in a group with (Italy) Sampdoria, (Belgium) Anderlecht and (Greece) Panathinaikos
1957–58	Quarter-finals	lost to (England) Manchester United 1–2 in Manchester, 3–3 in Belgrade
1973–74	Quarter-finals	lost to (Spain) Atlético Madrid 0–2 in Belgrade, 0–0 in Madrid
1980–81	Quarter-finals	lost to (Italy) Internazionale 1–1 in Milan, 0–1 in Belgrade
1981–82	Quarter-finals	lost to (Belgium) Anderlecht 1–2 in Brussels, 1–2 in Belgrade
1986–87	Quarter-finals	lost to (Spain) Real Madrid 4–2 in Belgrade, 0–2 in Madrid
UEFA Cup / UEFA Europa League
1978–79	Runners-up	lost to (West Germany) Borussia Mönchengladbach 1–1 in Belgrade, 0–1 in Düsseldorf
UEFA Cup Winners' Cup
1974–75	Semi-finals	lost to (Hungary) Ferencváros 1–2 in Budapest, 2–2 in Belgrade
1971–72	Quarter-finals	lost to (Soviet Union) Dynamo Moscow 1–2 in Belgrade, 1–1 in Moscow
1985–86	Quarter-finals	lost to (Spain) Atlético Madrid 0–2 in Belgrade, 1–1 in Madrid
UEFA Super Cup
1991	Runners-up	lost to (England) Manchester United 0–1 in Manchester
Intercontinental Cup
1991	Winners	defeated (Chile) Colo-Colo 3–0 in Tokyo
Inter-Cities Fairs Cup
1961–62	Semi-finals	lost to (Spain) Barcelona 0–2 in Belgrade, 1–4 in Barcelona
1962–63	Quarter-finals	lost to (Italy) Roma 0–3 in Rome, 2–0 in Belgrade
Mitropa Cup
1958	Winners	defeated (Czechoslovakia) Rudá Hvězda Brno 4–1 in Belgrade, 3–2 in Brno
1967–68	Winners	defeated (Czechoslovakia) Spartak Trnava 0–1 in Trnava, 4–1 in Belgrade
1957	Semi-finals	lost to (Hungary) Vasas 1–3 in Budapest, 2–3 in Belgrade

Biggest win in UEFA competition:

Season	Match	Score
European Cup / UEFA Champions League
1957–58	Red Star – Stade Dudelange	9–1
1969–70	Red Star – Linfield	8–0

== Players ==
As of 2 October 2026

=== First team ===
Note: Flags indicate national team as defined under FIFA eligibility rules; some limited exceptions apply. Players may hold more than one non-FIFA nationality.

No.	Pos.	Nation	Player
1	GK	BRA	Matheus
3	DF	JPN	Yūta Nakayama
4	MF	MNE	Mirko Ivanić (captain)
6	MF	GAM	Mahmudu Bajo
7	FW	AUT	Marko Arnautović
8	MF	BUL	Kristiyan Balov
9	FW	SEN	Bamba Dieng
10	MF	SRB	Aleksandar Katai (vice-captain)
13	DF	SRB	Miloš Veljković
14	MF	GHA	Osman Bukari (on loan from Widzew Łódź)
15	MF	ISR	Mohammad Abu Fani
19	MF	KOR	Kim Ye-geon
20	MF	POR	Tomás Händel
21	MF	SLO	Timi Max Elšnik
22	MF	SRB	Vasilije Kostov

No.	Pos.	Nation	Player
23	DF	SRB	Mihailo Ristić
27	DF	SRB	Matej Strika
30	DF	NGR	Franklin Tebo Uchenna
32	DF	GHA	Derrick Luckassen
33	MF	BIH	Rade Krunić (3rd captain)
37	MF	SRB	Vladimir Lučić
45	DF	SRB	Stefan Gudelj
50	GK	SRB	Savo Radanović
55	MF	SRB	Dimitrije Šarić
60	MF	MKD	Matej Gashtarov
66	MF	SRB	Andrej Sibinović
70	MF	AUT	Muhammed Cham (on loan from Trabzonspor)
71	DF	SRB	Adem Avdić
75	MF	CYP	Loizos Loizou
77	GK	SRB	Ivan Guteša

==== Players with multiple nationalities ====
- (Serbia) (Bosnia and Herzegovina) Stefan Gudelj
- (Serbia) (Bosnia and Herzegovina) Savo Radanović
- (Serbia) (Bosnia and Herzegovina) Mihailo Ristić
- (Serbia) (Bosnia and Herzegovina) Matej Strika
- (Serbia) (Switzerland) Miloš Veljković
- (Austria) (Serbia) Marko Arnautović
- (Bosnia and Herzegovina) (Serbia) Rade Krunić
- (Brazil) (Portugal) Matheus
- (Bulgaria) (Serbia) Kristiyan Balov
- (Ghana) (Netherlands) Derrick Luckassen
- (Ghana) (Serbia) Osman Bukari
- (Montenegro) (Serbia) Mirko Ivanić
- (North Macedonia) (Serbia) Matej Gashtarov
- (Portugal) (Austria) Tomás Händel

=== On dual registration ===
Note: Flags indicate national team as defined under FIFA eligibility rules; some limited exceptions apply. Players may hold more than one non-FIFA nationality.

No.	Pos.	Nation	Player
27	DF	SRB	Matej Strika (with (Serbia) Grafičar Beograd until the end of the 2026–27 season)
44	DF	SRB	Strahinja Baucal (with (Serbia) Grafičar Beograd until the end of the 2026–27 season)
48	MF	SRB	Ognjen Matanović (with (Serbia) Grafičar Beograd until the end of the 2026–27 season)

No.	Pos.	Nation	Player
50	GK	SRB	Savo Radanović (with (Serbia) Grafičar Beograd until the end of the 2026–27 season)
55	MF	SRB	Dimitrije Šarić (with (Serbia) Grafičar Beograd until the end of the 2026–27 season)

=== Out on loan ===
Note: Flags indicate national team as defined under FIFA eligibility rules; some limited exceptions apply. Players may hold more than one non-FIFA nationality.

No.	Pos.	Nation	Player
8	MF	SRB	Jovan Šljivić (at (Serbia) OFK Beograd until the end of the 2026–27 season)
31	FW	SRB	Uroš Sremčević (at (Serbia) Radnički 1923 until the end of the 2026–27 season)
34	DF	SRB	Balša Papović (at (Serbia) Grafičar Beograd until the end of the 2026–27 season)
40	MF	SRB	Luka Zarić (at (Serbia) OFK Beograd until the end of the 2026–27 season)
41	MF	GHA	Edmund Addo (at (Serbia) OFK Beograd until the end of the 2026–27 season)
41	MF	SRB	Dragan Anokić (at (Serbia) Grafičar Beograd until the end of the 2026–27 season)

No.	Pos.	Nation	Player
47	DF	SRB	Vuk Roganović (at (Serbia) Grafičar Beograd until the end of the 2026–27 season)
65	DF	MKD	Gorazd Ristovski (at (Serbia) Grafičar Beograd until the end of the 2026–27 season)
70	MF	SRB	Uroš Đorđević (at (Serbia) Grafičar Beograd until the end of the 2026–27 season)
80	MF	GAB	Shavy Babicka (at (United Arab Emirates) Dubai United until the end of the 2026–27 season)
91	MF	SRB	Vasilije Subotić (at (Serbia) Grafičar Beograd until the end of the 2026–27 season)
—	MF	SRB	Ognjen Mišić (at (Serbia) Torlak until the end of the 2026–27 season)

=== Captains ===
- (Socialist Federal Republic of Yugoslavia) Milovan Ćirić (1945–1947)
- (Socialist Federal Republic of Yugoslavia) Rajko Mitić (1947–1958)
- (Socialist Federal Republic of Yugoslavia) Ljubiša Spajić (1958–1960)
- (Socialist Federal Republic of Yugoslavia) Branko Zebec (1960–1961)
- (Socialist Federal Republic of Yugoslavia) Vladica Popović (1961–1965)
- (Socialist Federal Republic of Yugoslavia) Vojislav Melić (1965–1967)
- (Socialist Federal Republic of Yugoslavia) Dragan Džajić (1967–1975)
- (Socialist Federal Republic of Yugoslavia) Vladislav Bogićević (1975–1977)
- (Socialist Federal Republic of Yugoslavia) Dragan Džajić (1977–1978)
- (Socialist Federal Republic of Yugoslavia) Vladimir Petrović (1978–1982)
- (Socialist Federal Republic of Yugoslavia) Miloš Šestić (1983–1984)
- (Socialist Federal Republic of Yugoslavia) Zlatko Krmpotić (1985)
- (Socialist Federal Republic of Yugoslavia) Boško Gjurovski (1986–1987)
- (Socialist Federal Republic of Yugoslavia) Dragan Stojković (1987–1990)
- (Socialist Federal Republic of Yugoslavia) Stevan Stojanović (1990–1991)
- (Socialist Federal Republic of Yugoslavia) Dejan Savićević (1991–1992)
- (Serbia and Montenegro) Duško Radinović (1992–1993)
- (Serbia and Montenegro) Goran Vasilijević (1993–1994)
- (Serbia and Montenegro) Ivan Adžić (1994–1996)
- (Serbia and Montenegro) Zvonko Milojević (1996–1997)
- (Serbia and Montenegro) Zoran Jovičić (1997–1998)
- (Serbia and Montenegro) Perica Ognjenović (1998)
- (Serbia and Montenegro) Dejan Savićević (1999)
- (Serbia and Montenegro) Goran Bunjevčević (1999–2001)
- (Serbia and Montenegro) Nenad Lalatović (2001–2002)
- (Serbia and Montenegro) Ivan Gvozdenović (2003)
- (Serbia and Montenegro) Nemanja Vidić (2003–2004)
- (Serbia and Montenegro) Vladimir Dišljenković (2004)
- (Serbia and Montenegro) Marko Pantelić (2005)
- (Serbia and Montenegro) Nenad Kovačević (2005–2006)
- (Serbia) Dejan Milovanović (2006–2008)
- (Serbia) Nenad Milijaš (2008–2009)
- (Serbia) Nikola Lazetić (2009–2010)
- (Serbia) Slavoljub Đorđević (2010)
- (Serbia) Pavle Ninkov (2010–2011)
- (Serbia) Nenad Kovačević (2011)
- (Serbia) Nikola Mikić (2011–2012)
- (Serbia) Nenad Milijaš (2012–2014)
- (Serbia) Nikola Mijailović (2014)
- (Serbia) Darko Lazović (2014)
- (Serbia) Aleksandar Luković (2015–2017)
- (Serbia) Nenad Milijaš (2017–2019)
- (Germany) Marko Marin (2019)
- (Canada) Milan Borjan (2020–2023)
- (Austria) Aleksandar Dragović (2023–2024)
- (Serbia) Uroš Spajić (2024)
- (Montenegro) Mirko Ivanić (2025–present)

=== Retired number(s) ===
11 (Socialist Federal Republic of Yugoslavia) Dragan Džajić, winger (1963–1975, 1977–1978)

On 2 September 2022, Red Star Belgrade announced that the squad number 11 will be retired from the 2023–24 season.

12 – Delije (the 12th Man)

26 (Serbia) Goran Gogić, midfielder (2013−2014) – posthumous honour.

Since 2014, Red Star Belgrade has not issued the squad number 26 in the Serbian SuperLiga. It was retired in memory of Goran Gogić, who died on 3 July 2015, aged 29. Gogić had also been assigned with jersey 25 for the 2014–15 season, which he had worn in Jagodina previously. Since then some of players, like Marko Marinković and Milan Jevtović used to be registered for the UEFA competitions. Jevtović also made his debut for the club with 26 jersey in summer 2018, but later chose number 33 in the domestic competition.

== Club officials ==
=== Technical staff ===
Current staff
- Head coach: (Spain) Albert Riera
- Assistant coach: (Italy) Lorenzo Dolcetti
- Assistant coach: (Serbia) Nikola Mikić
- Assistant coach: (Serbia) Miloš Stojčev
- Goalkeeper coach: (Serbia) Dušan Gašić
- Goalkeeper coach: (Bosnia and Herzegovina) Nemanja Supić
- Analyst: (Serbia) Albert Morgan
- Head fitness coach: (Serbia) Aleksandar Stajkovac
- Fitness coach: (Serbia) Nikola Todorić
- Doctor: (Serbia) Miodrag Mladenović
- Doctor: (Serbia) Pavle Maksimović
- Physiotherapist: (Serbia) Nenad Kovačević
- Physiotherapist: (Serbia) Željko Vasojević
- Physiotherapist: (Serbia) Ivan Jovanović
- Physiotherapist: (Serbia) Kristijan Malečkar
- Nutritionist: (Serbia) Vasilije Radovanović
- Team manager: (Serbia) Goran Negić
- Kit manager: (Serbia) Stojan Milanović
- Kit manager: (Serbia) Dušan Maričić
- Kit manager: (Serbia) Milorad Ranković
- Assistant team manager: (Serbia) Miloš Đorović

=== Club management ===
Current staff
- President: (Serbia) Svetozar Mijailović
- Honorary president: (Serbia) Dragan Džajić
- Vice president: (Serbia) Jovan Aćimović
- Vice president: (Serbia) Milenko Kostić
- General director: (Serbia) Zvezdan Terzić
- Sporting director: (Serbia) Mitar Mrkela
- Operations director: (Serbia) Marko Petrović
- Technical director: (Germany) Marko Marin
- Director of corporate affairs: (Serbia) Aleksandra Milošević
- Director of the youth school: (Serbia) Nikola Jelić
- PR manager: (Serbia) Miljan Milošević
- Press officer: (Serbia) Tamara Popović
- Board of directors: Svetozar Mijailović, Jovan Aćimović, Milenko Kostić, Slobodan Babić, Jug Radivojević, Stojan Vujko, Velimir Marković, Miljko Ristić, Nikola Dumnić, Dušan Savić, Zoran Avramović, Dušan Milosavljević, Vladimir Kraljačić
- Supervisory board: Dejan Vasić, Vladimir Bubanja, Nenad Zlatanović, Pavle Kavran, Đorđe Bjelaković

=== Coaching history ===
For details see List of Red Star Belgrade football coaches

- (Socialist Federal Republic of Yugoslavia) Branislav Sekulić (1946)
- (Socialist Federal Republic of Yugoslavia) Svetislav Glišović (1946–1948)
- (Socialist Federal Republic of Yugoslavia) Aleksandar Tomašević (1948–1950)
- (Socialist Federal Republic of Yugoslavia) Ljubiša Broćić (1951)
- (Socialist Federal Republic of Yugoslavia) Žarko Mihajlović (1951)
- (Socialist Federal Republic of Yugoslavia) Branislav Sekulić (1952)
- (Socialist Federal Republic of Yugoslavia) Žarko Mihajlović (1952–1953)
- (Socialist Federal Republic of Yugoslavia) Ljubiša Broćić (1953–1954)
- (Socialist Federal Republic of Yugoslavia) Boško Ralić (1954)
- (Socialist Federal Republic of Yugoslavia) Milovan Ćirić (1954–1957)
- (Socialist Federal Republic of Yugoslavia) Milorad Pavić (1957–1964)
- (Socialist Federal Republic of Yugoslavia) Ivan Toplak (1964–1966)
- (Socialist Federal Republic of Yugoslavia) Miljan Miljanić (1966–1974)
- (Socialist Federal Republic of Yugoslavia) Miljenko Mihić (1974–1975)
- (Socialist Federal Republic of Yugoslavia) Milovan Ćirić (1975–1976)
- (Socialist Federal Republic of Yugoslavia) Gojko Zec (1976–1978)
- (Socialist Federal Republic of Yugoslavia) Branko Stanković (1978–1982)
- (Socialist Federal Republic of Yugoslavia) Stevan Ostojić (1982–1983)
- (Socialist Federal Republic of Yugoslavia) Gojko Zec (1983–1986)
- (Socialist Federal Republic of Yugoslavia) Velibor Vasović (1986–1988)
- (Socialist Federal Republic of Yugoslavia) Branko Stanković (1988)
- (Socialist Federal Republic of Yugoslavia) Dragoslav Šekularac (1989–1990)
- (Socialist Federal Republic of Yugoslavia) Ljupko Petrović (1990–1991)
- (Socialist Federal Republic of Yugoslavia) Vladica Popović (1991–1992)
- (Serbia and Montenegro) Milan Živadinović (1992–1994)
- (Serbia and Montenegro) Ljupko Petrović (1994–1996)
- (Serbia and Montenegro) Vladimir "Pižon" Petrović (1996–1997)
- (Serbia and Montenegro) Vojin Lazarević (1997)
- (Serbia and Montenegro) Milorad Kosanović (1997–1998)
- (Serbia and Montenegro) Vojin Lazarević (1998–1999)
- (Serbia and Montenegro) Miloljub Ostojić (1999)
- (Serbia and Montenegro) Zvonko Radić (caretaker) (1999)
- (Serbia and Montenegro) Slavoljub Muslin (1999–2001)
- (Serbia and Montenegro) Zoran Filipović (2001–2003)
- (Serbia and Montenegro) Slavoljub Muslin (2003–2004)
- (Serbia and Montenegro) Ljupko Petrović (2004)
- (Serbia and Montenegro) Milovan Rajevac (caretaker) (2004)
- (Serbia and Montenegro) Ratko Dostanić (2004–2005)
- (Italy) Walter Zenga (2005–2006)
- (Bosnia and Herzegovina) Dušan Bajević (2006–2007)
- (North Macedonia) Boško Gjurovski (2007)
- (Serbia) Milorad Kosanović (2007)
- (Serbia) Aleksandar Janković (2007–2008)
- (Czech Republic) (Italy) Zdeněk Zeman (2008)
- (North Macedonia) Čedomir Janevski (2008–2009)
- (Serbia) (Cyprus) Siniša Gogić (caretaker) (2009)
- (Serbia) Vladimir "Pižon" Petrović (2009–2010)
- (Serbia) Ratko Dostanić (2010)
- (Serbia) Aleksandar Kristić (2010)
- (Croatia) Robert Prosinečki (2010–2012)
- (Serbia) Aleksandar Janković (2012–2013)
- (Portugal) Ricardo Sá Pinto (2013)
- (Slovenia) Slaviša Stojanović (2013–2014)
- (Serbia) Nenad Lalatović (2014–2015)
- (Montenegro) Miodrag Božović (2015–2017)
- (North Macedonia) Boško Gjurovski (caretaker) (2017)
- (Serbia) Vladan Milojević (2017–2019)
- (Serbia) Dejan Stanković (2019–2022)
- (Serbia) Miloš Milojević (2022–2023)
- (Israel) Barak Bakhar (2023)
- (Serbia) Vladan Milojević (2023–2025)
- (Serbia) Dejan Stanković (2025–2026)
- (Spain) Albert Riera (2026–present)

=== Club presidents ===
- (Socialist Federal Republic of Yugoslavia) Mita Miljković (1948–1951)
- (Socialist Federal Republic of Yugoslavia) Isa Jovanović (1951–1952)
- (Socialist Federal Republic of Yugoslavia) Sava Radojčić (1952–1954)
- (Socialist Federal Republic of Yugoslavia) Dragoslav Marković (1954–1955)
- (Socialist Federal Republic of Yugoslavia) Milić Bugarčić (1955–1956)
- (Socialist Federal Republic of Yugoslavia) Dragoje Đurić (1956)
- (Socialist Federal Republic of Yugoslavia) Dušan Blagojević (1956–1960)
- (Socialist Federal Republic of Yugoslavia) Milić Bugarčić (1960–1963)
- (Socialist Federal Republic of Yugoslavia) Radovan Pantović (1963–1965)
- (Socialist Federal Republic of Yugoslavia) Dušan Blagojević (1965–1968)
- (Socialist Federal Republic of Yugoslavia) Nikola Bugarčić (1968–1977)
- (Socialist Federal Republic of Yugoslavia) Radovan Pantović (1977–1981)
- (Socialist Federal Republic of Yugoslavia) Brana Dimitrijević (1981–1982)
- (Socialist Federal Republic of Yugoslavia) Vlastimir Purić (1982)
- (Socialist Federal Republic of Yugoslavia) Miladin Šakić (1982–1987)
- (Serbia and Montenegro) Svetozar Mijailović (1987–1993)
- (Serbia and Montenegro) Dragan Džajić (1998–2004)
- (Serbia) Dragan Stojković (2005–2007)
- (Serbia) Toplica Spasojević (2007–2008)
- (Serbia) Dobrivoje Tanasijević (2008–2009)
- (Serbia) Vladan Lukić (2009–2012)
- (Serbia) Dragan Džajić (2012–2014)
- (Serbia) Svetozar Mijailović (2014–present)

== Notable players ==
=== Stars of Red Star ===
Red Star has almost a 50-year-long tradition of giving the title of the Star of [Red] Star or The Star's star (Serbian: Звездина звезда / Zvezdina zvezda) to the players that had a major impact on the club's history and have made the name of the club famous around the globe. So far, five players and the entire 1991 team were officially given the title. They are:

- The 1st Star of Red Star: Rajko Mitić
- The 2nd Star of Red Star: Dragoslav Šekularac
- The 3rd Star of Red Star: Dragan Džajić
- The 4th Star of Red Star: Vladimir Petrović "Pižon"
- The 5th Star of Red Star: Dragan Stojković "Piksi"
- The 6th Star of Red Star: The 1991 European Cup Winner Generation

=== The 1991 European Cup Winner Generation ===
Generation 1991 with 21 players was presented at the ceremony by president Svetozar Mijailović.

Note: Flags indicate national team as defined under FIFA eligibility rules; some limited exceptions apply. Players may hold more than one non-FIFA nationality.

No.	Pos.	Nation	Player
—	GK	YUG	Stevan Stojanović
—	GK	YUG	Željko Kaluđerović
—	GK	YUG	Milić Jovanović
—	DF	YUG	Duško Radinović
—	DF	YUG	Slobodan Marović
—	DF	YUG	Refik Šabanadžović
—	DF	ROU	Miodrag Belodedici
—	DF	YUG	Ilija Najdoski
—	DF	YUG	Goran Vasilijević
—	DF	YUG	Goran Jurić
—	DF	YUG	Rade Tošić

No.	Pos.	Nation	Player
—	MF	YUG	Vladimir Jugović
—	MF	YUG	Robert Prosinečki
—	MF	YUG	Dejan Savićević
—	MF	YUG	Siniša Mihajlović
—	MF	YUG	Vlada Stošić
—	MF	YUG	Ivica Momčilović
—	FW	YUG	Darko Pančev
—	FW	YUG	Dragiša Binić
—	FW	YUG	Vladan Lukić
—	FW	YUG	Ljubiša Milojević

=== Notable players ===
To appear in this section a player must have played at least 80 matches for the club.
Flags indicate national teams they played for, not nationality.

- (Socialist Federal Republic of Yugoslavia) Jovan Aćimović
- (Socialist Federal Republic of Yugoslavia) Zoran Antonijević
- (Socialist Federal Republic of Yugoslavia) Petar Baralić
- (Socialist Federal Republic of Yugoslavia) Vladimir Beara
- (Socialist Federal Republic of Yugoslavia) Dejan Bekić
- (Socialist Federal Republic of Yugoslavia) Cvijetin Blagojević
- (Socialist Federal Republic of Yugoslavia) Vladislav Bogićević
- (Socialist Federal Republic of Yugoslavia) Zdravko Borovnica
- (Socialist Federal Republic of Yugoslavia) Jovan Cokić
- (Socialist Federal Republic of Yugoslavia) Borislav Cvetković
- (Socialist Federal Republic of Yugoslavia) Milan Čop
- (Socialist Federal Republic of Yugoslavia) Kiril Dojčinovski
- (Socialist Federal Republic of Yugoslavia) Ratomir Dujković
- (Socialist Federal Republic of Yugoslavia) Vladimir Durković
- (Socialist Federal Republic of Yugoslavia) Predrag Đajić
- (Socialist Federal Republic of Yugoslavia) Ranko Đorđić
- (Socialist Federal Republic of Yugoslavia) Milovan Đorić
- (Socialist Federal Republic of Yugoslavia) Žarko Đurović
- (Socialist Federal Republic of Yugoslavia) (Slovenia) Marko Elsner
- (Socialist Federal Republic of Yugoslavia) Zoran Filipović
- (Socialist Federal Republic of Yugoslavia) (North Macedonia) Boško Gjurovski
- (Socialist Federal Republic of Yugoslavia) (North Macedonia) Milko Gjurovski
- (Socialist Federal Republic of Yugoslavia) Milan Janković
- (Socialist Federal Republic of Yugoslavia) Slobodan Janković
- (Socialist Federal Republic of Yugoslavia) Rajko Janjanin
- (Socialist Federal Republic of Yugoslavia) Zoran Jelikić
- (Socialist Federal Republic of Yugoslavia) Živorad Jevtić
- (Socialist Federal Republic of Yugoslavia) Nikola Jovanović
- (Socialist Federal Republic of Yugoslavia) Milan Jovin
- (Socialist Federal Republic of Yugoslavia) Ivan Jurišić
- (Socialist Federal Republic of Yugoslavia) Stanislav Karasi
- (Socialist Federal Republic of Yugoslavia) Mihalj Keri
- (Socialist Federal Republic of Yugoslavia) Branko Klenkovski
- (Socialist Federal Republic of Yugoslavia) Bora Kostić
- (Socialist Federal Republic of Yugoslavia) Zlatko Krdžević
- (Socialist Federal Republic of Yugoslavia) Miodrag Krivokapić
- (Socialist Federal Republic of Yugoslavia) Petar Krivokuća
- (Socialist Federal Republic of Yugoslavia) Srboljub Krivokuća
- (Socialist Federal Republic of Yugoslavia) Zlatko Krmpotić
- (Socialist Federal Republic of Yugoslavia) Vojin Lazarević
- (Socialist Federal Republic of Yugoslavia) Ljubomir Lovrić
- (Socialist Federal Republic of Yugoslavia) Živan Ljukovčan
- (Socialist Federal Republic of Yugoslavia) Dušan Maravić
- (Socialist Federal Republic of Yugoslavia) Vojislav Melić
- (Socialist Federal Republic of Yugoslavia) Trifun Mihailović
- (Socialist Federal Republic of Yugoslavia) Dragan Miletović
- (Socialist Federal Republic of Yugoslavia) Tomislav Milićević
- (Socialist Federal Republic of Yugoslavia) Goran Milojević
- (Socialist Federal Republic of Yugoslavia) Nedeljko Milosavljević
- (Socialist Federal Republic of Yugoslavia) Đorđe Milovanović
- (Socialist Federal Republic of Yugoslavia) Mitar Mrkela
- (Socialist Federal Republic of Yugoslavia) (Bosnia and Herzegovina) Husref Musemić
- (Socialist Federal Republic of Yugoslavia) Slavoljub Muslin
- (Socialist Federal Republic of Yugoslavia) Dušan Nikolić
- (Socialist Federal Republic of Yugoslavia) Jovica Nikolić
- (Socialist Federal Republic of Yugoslavia) Mile Novković
- (Socialist Federal Republic of Yugoslavia) Tihomir Ognjanov
- (Socialist Federal Republic of Yugoslavia) Stevan Ostojić
- (Socialist Federal Republic of Yugoslavia) Béla Pálfi
- (Socialist Federal Republic of Yugoslavia) Aleksandar Panajotović
- (Socialist Federal Republic of Yugoslavia) Miroslav Pavlović
- (Socialist Federal Republic of Yugoslavia) Ognjen Petrović
- (Socialist Federal Republic of Yugoslavia) Vladimir Popović
- (Socialist Federal Republic of Yugoslavia) Slavko Radovanović
- (Socialist Federal Republic of Yugoslavia) Branko Radović
- (Socialist Federal Republic of Yugoslavia) Srebrenko Repčić
- (Socialist Federal Republic of Yugoslavia) Antun Rudinski
- (Socialist Federal Republic of Yugoslavia) Dušan Savić
- (Socialist Federal Republic of Yugoslavia) Ljubiša Spajić
- (Socialist Federal Republic of Yugoslavia) Branko Stanković
- (Socialist Federal Republic of Yugoslavia) Nikola Stipić
- (Socialist Federal Republic of Yugoslavia) Aleksandar Stojanović
- (Socialist Federal Republic of Yugoslavia) Sead Sušić
- (Socialist Federal Republic of Yugoslavia) Miloš Šestić
- (Socialist Federal Republic of Yugoslavia) Slobodan Škrbić
- (Socialist Federal Republic of Yugoslavia) Miroslav Šugar
- (Socialist Federal Republic of Yugoslavia) Lazar Tasić
- (Socialist Federal Republic of Yugoslavia) Kosta Tomašević
- (Socialist Federal Republic of Yugoslavia) Novak Tomić
- (Socialist Federal Republic of Yugoslavia) Ivan Toplak
- (Socialist Federal Republic of Yugoslavia) Branislav Vukosavljević
- (Socialist Federal Republic of Yugoslavia) Miljan Zeković
- (Socialist Federal Republic of Yugoslavia) Siniša Zlatković
- (Socialist Federal Republic of Yugoslavia) Todor Živanović
- (Serbia and Montenegro) Ivan Adžić
- (Serbia and Montenegro) Srđan Bajčetić
- (Serbia and Montenegro) (Serbia) Dušan Basta
- (Serbia and Montenegro) (Montenegro) Dragan Bogavac
- (Serbia and Montenegro) (Montenegro) Branko Bošković
- (Serbia and Montenegro) Goran Bunjevčević
- (Serbia and Montenegro) (Serbia) Vladimir Dišljenković
- (Serbia and Montenegro) Goran Drulić
- (Serbia and Montenegro) Ivan Dudić
- (Serbia and Montenegro) Milan Dudić
- (Serbia and Montenegro) Slavoljub Đorđević
- (Serbia and Montenegro) Goran Đorović
- (Serbia and Montenegro) Jovan Gojković
- (Serbia and Montenegro) Ivan Gvozdenović
- (Serbia and Montenegro) Dejan Ilić
- (Serbia and Montenegro) Ilija Ivić
- (Serbia and Montenegro) Branko Jelić
- (Serbia and Montenegro) Dragoslav Jevrić
- (Serbia and Montenegro) Zoran Jovičić
- (Serbia and Montenegro) Aleksandar Kocić
- (Serbia and Montenegro) (Serbia) Ognjen Koroman
- (Serbia and Montenegro) (Serbia) Nenad Kovačević
- (Serbia and Montenegro) Radovan Krivokapić
- (Serbia and Montenegro) Nebojša Krupniković
- (Serbia and Montenegro) Nenad Lalatović
- (Serbia and Montenegro) Leo Lerinc
- (Serbia and Montenegro) (Serbia) Aleksandar Luković
- (Serbia and Montenegro) Vinko Marinović
- (Serbia and Montenegro) (Serbia) Marjan Marković
- (Serbia and Montenegro) Dragan Mićić
- (Serbia and Montenegro) Zvonko Milojević
- (Serbia and Montenegro) Dragan Mladenović
- (Serbia and Montenegro) Zoran Njeguš
- (Serbia and Montenegro) Perica Ognjenović
- (Serbia and Montenegro) Miodrag Pantelić
- (Serbia and Montenegro) Dejan Petković
- (Serbia and Montenegro) Mihajlo Pjanović
- (Serbia and Montenegro) Nikola Radmanović
- (Serbia and Montenegro) Nenad Sakić
- (Serbia and Montenegro) (Serbia) Dejan Stanković
- (Serbia and Montenegro) (Serbia) Nemanja Vidić
- (Serbia and Montenegro) Milivoje Vitakić
- (Serbia and Montenegro) (Serbia) Nikola Žigić
- (Serbia and Montenegro) Bratislav Živković
- (Serbia) Dušan Anđelković
- (Serbia) Srđan Babić
- (Serbia) Milan Biševac
- (Serbia) Strahinja Eraković
- (Serbia) Milan Gajić
- (Serbia) Marko Gobeljić
- (Serbia) Boško Janković
- (Serbia) Aleksandar Katai
- (Serbia) Nenad Krstičić
- (Serbia) Darko Lazović
- (Serbia) Srđan Mijailović
- (Serbia) Nikola Mikić
- (Serbia) Nenad Milijaš
- (Serbia) Dejan Milovanović
- (Serbia) Nemanja Milunović
- (Serbia) Dragan Mrđa
- (Serbia) Veljko Nikolić
- (Serbia) Pavle Ninkov
- (Serbia) Radovan Pankov
- (Serbia) Milan Pavkov
- (Serbia) Marko Perović
- (Serbia) Aleksandar Pešić
- (Serbia) Marko Petković
- (Serbia) Njegoš Petrović
- (Serbia) Nemanja Radonjić
- (Serbia) Ivan Ranđelović
- (Serbia) Mihailo Ristić
- (Serbia) Milan Rodić
- (Serbia) Vujadin Savić
- (Serbia) Slavoljub Srnić
- (Serbia) Saša Stamenković
- (Serbia) Đorđe Tutorić
- (Serbia) Aleksa Vukanović

=== Notable foreign players ===
To appear in this section a player must have played at least 30 matches for the club.

- (Angola) Felício Milson
- (Argentina) Luis Ibáñez
- (Armenia) Nair Tiknizyan
- (Australia) Miloš Degenek
- (Australia) Milan Ivanović
- (Austria) Marko Arnautović
- (Austria) Aleksandar Dragović
- (Bosnia and Herzegovina) Rade Krunić
- (Bosnia and Herzegovina) Srđan Pecelj
- (Brazil) Cadú
- (Brazil) Bruno Duarte
- (Brazil) Evandro
- (Brazil) Matheus
- (Brazil) Rodrigão
- (Brazil) Sávio
- (Burkina Faso) Nasser Djiga
- (Canada) Milan Borjan
- (Colombia) Cristian Borja
- (Comoros) El Fardou Ben
- (Costa Rica) John Jairo Ruiz
- (Ecuador) Segundo Castillo
- (France) Damien Le Tallec
- (Gabon) Guélor Kanga
- (Germany) Marko Marin
- (Ghana) Lee Addy
- (Ghana) Richmond Boakye
- (Ghana) Osman Bukari
- (Ghana) Abraham Frimpong
- (Ghana) Mohammed-Awal Issah
- (Israel) Omri Glazer
- (Italy) Diego Falcinelli
- (Italy) Filippo Falco
- (Ivory Coast) Jean-Philippe Krasso
- (Ivory Coast) Sékou Sanogo
- (Montenegro) Boban Bajković
- (Montenegro) Igor Burzanović
- (Montenegro) Mirko Ivanić
- (Montenegro) Filip Kasalica
- (Montenegro) Nemanja Nikolić
- (Montenegro) Savo Pavićević
- (Montenegro) Milan Purović
- (Montenegro) Vukan Savićević
- (Montenegro) Filip Stojković
- (Montenegro) Marko Vešović
- (Netherlands) Lorenzo Ebecilio
- (New Zealand) Marko Stamenić
- (Nigeria) Abiola Dauda
- (Nigeria) Peter Olayinka
- (Nigeria) Franklin Tebo Uchenna
- (North Macedonia) Blaže Georgioski
- (North Macedonia) Mitko Stojkovski
- (North Macedonia) Ivan Trichkovski
- (Portugal) Tomás Händel
- (Portugal) Tomané
- (Portugal) Hugo Vieira
- (Senegal) Ibrahima Gueye
- (Senegal) Cherif Ndiaye
- (Slovenia) Milenko Ačimovič
- (Slovenia) Timi Max Elšnik
- (Slovenia) Nejc Pečnik
- (South Korea) Hwang In-beom
- (South Korea) Seol Young-woo
- (Suriname) Mitchell Donald
- (Zambia) Kings Kangwa

== Kit suppliers and shirt sponsors ==
Period	Kit manufacturer	Shirt sponsor
1977–1978	Admiral	–
1979	Puma	–
1980–1986	Puma	Kristal Zaječar
1986–1987	Puma	de LUXE
1987–1988	Puma	Lee Cooper
1988–1989	Puma	Casucci
1989–1990	Puma	Mister Baby
1990–1991	Puma	DEXIM
1991–1993	Hummel	Classic
1993–1994	Hummel	Komercijalna banka
1994–1996	Diadora	Beobanka
1996–1998	Kappa	Beobanka
1998–2001	Kappa	Pils Light
2001–2003	Adidas	–
2003–2005	Adidas	Wiener Städtische; Sharp
2005–2006	Adidas	Toyota
2006–2008	Nike	Toyota
2008–2009	Nike	–
2010	Nike	2344 – Za moju Zvezdu
2010–2012	Nike	Gazprom
2012–2013	Legea	Gazprom
2013–2017	Puma	Gazprom
2017–	Macron	Gazprom

== General sponsor ==
The general sponsor of Serbia's most popular football club has, since 2010, been Gazprom Neft, the majority shareholder in leading Serbian company Naftna Industrija Srbije (NIS), and the most important foreign investor in the country. The club has won eleven Serbian championship titles and seven Serbian Cups in that time, as well as regularly competing in European championships. This cooperation, as well as supporting Gazprom Neft's brands, also involves collaborating in youth football together with FC Zenit Saint Petersburg, with the clubs exchanging youth players and holding friendly youth matches.

== In popular culture ==
The club's name in Serbian is also the title of the 2013 Italian novel Crvena Zvezda by Enrico Varrecchione. Written in the alternate history genre, utilizing elements of uchronia, its story is based on the premise of what if 9 November 1988 return leg of the European Cup second round clash between Red Star and AC Milan hadn't been ordered abandoned by German referee Dieter Pauly in the 65th minute due to thick fog that night in Belgrade. Red Star were leading 1–0 after a goal by Dejan Savićević and were also a man up due to Milan striker Pietro Paolo Virdis receiving a red card. After abandonment, UEFA cancelled the match and ordered it replayed in full the next day. This time it finished 1–1 and went to penalties (the first leg in Milan also ended 1–1) where Milan won and went through to the quarter-finals, eventually winning the European Cup—thus getting the coveted trophy again after twenty years, the club's first under its recently arrived owner, ambitious businessman Silvio Berlusconi. In the novel's parallel universe, Red Star won 9 November 1988 match in Belgrade and eliminated AC Milan, which thus never won its 1989 European Cup, meaning that Berlusconi's ultimate entry into Italian politics had a much weaker background push, which adversely affected his performance at the 1994 Italian general election. The novel also follows the fate of Red Star's fictional striker, loosely based on Savićević, Jovan Eldzic who scored the famous goal in the fog and later went on to transfer to AC Milan where he achieved more accolades, eventually taking Italian citizenship, remaining living in Italy upon retiring from football before entering politics and running for mayor of a small town in Piedmont's Alessandria province.

Billy Bragg's 1991 UK top thirty hit song "Sexuality" contains the lyric "I had an uncle who once played for Red Star Belgrade." When interviewed many years later Bragg was asked if this was true, to which he replied that his uncle actually played for Fulham but that did not fit the rhyme with played.

Two non-related bands, one of them from Great Yarmouth, Great Britain, and the other one from Chapel Hill, North Carolina, United States, shared the name Red Star Belgrade.

A football club in Ecuador, in the city of Cuenca, created in 1961, is inspired in Red Star Belgrade. It is named Club Social y Deportivo Estrella Roja (CSD Estrella Roja). Estrella Roja is the translation and the way Red Star is known in Spanish speaking countries. The club crest is even the same as the one Red Star had between 1995 and 2011.

A junior football team called 'Lenadoon Red Star' played in West Belfast, Northern Ireland, from 1972 to 1975 during the height of The Troubles. The team wrote to Red Star Belgrade in the early 1970s, asking if they could donate any kits to the young team, but Red Star Belgrade wrote back saying they couldn't afford to send over any kits.

== See also ==
- List of world champion football clubs
