= 2025–26 Red Star Belgrade season =

Red Star Belgrade
2025–26 season
- Chairman: Zvezdan Terzić
- Manager: Vladan Milojević; Dejan Stanković
- Stadium: Rajko Mitić Stadium
- Serbian SuperLiga: 1st
- Serbian Cup: Winners
- UEFA Champions League: Play-off round
- UEFA Europa League: Knockout phase play-offs
- Top goalscorer: League: Aleksandar Katai (24); All: Aleksandar Katai (25)
- Biggest win: Red Star 7–1 OFK Beograd; Red Star 7–1 Železničar Pančevo
Home colours	Away colours	Third colours

The 2025–26 Red Star Belgrade season was the club's 20th in the Serbian SuperLiga and 80th consecutive season in top flight of Yugoslav and Serbian football. The club participated in the Serbian SuperLiga, Serbian Cup and UEFA Europa League, having been eliminated from the UEFA Champions League in the play-off round.

== Season summary ==
On 26 August 2025, Red Star were eliminated by debutants Pafos in the play-off round of the UEFA Champions League and thereby dropped down into the league stage of the UEFA Europa League. It is the first time since the 2022–23 season that Red Star failed to make the group stage of the Champions League.

== Players ==
As of 2 February 2026

=== First team ===
Note: Flags indicate national team as defined under FIFA eligibility rules; some limited exceptions apply. Players may hold more than one non-FIFA nationality.

No.	Pos.	Nation	Player
1	GK	BRA	Matheus
4	MF	MNE	Mirko Ivanić (captain)
5	DF	BRA	Rodrigão
6	MF	GAM	Mahmudu Bajo
10	MF	SRB	Aleksandar Katai (vice-captain)
13	DF	SRB	Miloš Veljković
17	FW	BRA	Bruno Duarte
18	GK	ISR	Omri Glazer
19	FW	SRB	Aleksa Damjanović
20	MF	POR	Tomás Händel
21	MF	SLO	Timi Max Elšnik
22	MF	SRB	Vasilije Kostov
23	DF	ARM	Nair Tiknizyan
24	DF	SRB	Nikola Stanković

No.	Pos.	Nation	Player
25	DF	SRB	Strahinja Eraković (on loan from Zenit)
30	DF	NGR	Franklin Tebo Uchenna
33	MF	BIH	Rade Krunić (3rd captain)
35	MF	GHA	Douglas Owusu
37	MF	SRB	Vladimir Lučić
40	MF	SRB	Luka Zarić
42	FW	NED	Jay Enem (on loan from OFK Beograd)
45	DF	SRB	Stefan Gudelj
49	MF	SRB	Nemanja Radonjić
50	GK	SRB	Savo Radanović
66	DF	KOR	Seol Young-woo
71	DF	SRB	Adem Avdić
77	GK	SRB	Ivan Guteša
89	FW	AUT	Marko Arnautović

== Transfers ==
=== In ===
Date	Pos.	Player	From	Fee	Ref.
22 June 2025	DF	(Armenia) Nair Tiknizyan	(Russia) Lokomotiv Moscow	Undisclosed	
25 June 2025	GK	(Brazil) Matheus	(Portugal) Braga	€1,500,000	
1 July 2025	DF	(Brazil) Rodrigão	Unattached	Free transfer	
1 July 2025	DF	(Serbia) Miloš Veljković	Unattached	Free transfer	
21 July 2025	FW	(Austria) Marko Arnautović	Unattached	Free transfer	
28 July 2025	DF	(Serbia) Nikola Stanković	(Serbia) Čukarički	Undisclosed	
2 August 2025	MF	(The Gambia) Mahmudu Bajo	(Slovakia) Dunajská Streda	Undisclosed	
2 August 2025	MF	(Gabon) Shavy Babicka	(France) Toulouse	Undisclosed	
15 August 2025	DF	(Nigeria) Franklin Tebo Uchenna	(Norway) Sarpsborg 08	Undisclosed	
2 September 2025	MF	(Portugal) Tomás Händel	(Portugal) Vitória de Guimarães	€3,100,000	
5 January 2026	FW	(Netherlands) Jay Enem	(Serbia) OFK Beograd	Loan	
9 January 2026	MF	(Ghana) Douglas Owusu	(Serbia) Radnik Surdulica	€2,500,000	
4 February 2026	DF	(Serbia) Strahinja Eraković	(Russia) Zenit Saint Petersburg	Loan	

=== Out ===
Date	Pos.	Player	To	Fee	Ref.
1 July 2025	MF	(Gabon) Guélor Kanga	(Turkey) Esenler Erokspor	End of contract	
5 July 2025	FW	(Serbia) Ognjen Teofilović	(Serbia) OFK Beograd	Undisclosed	
8 July 2025	FW	(Serbia) Lazar Jovanović	(Germany) VfB Stuttgart	Undisclosed	
9 July 2025	DF	(Montenegro) Andrej Đurić	(Sweden) Malmö FF	Undisclosed	
13 July 2025	DF	(Senegal) Mamadou Fall	(Serbia) OFK Beograd	Free transfer	
16 July 2025	MF	(Serbia) Andrija Maksimović	(Germany) RB Leipzig	Undisclosed	
18 July 2025	MF	(Serbia) Luka Ilić	(Spain) Real Oviedo	Undisclosed	
27 July 2025	DF	(Serbia) Milan Rodić	(Switzerland) FC Zürich	Undisclosed	
7 August 2025	DF	(Ghana) Ebenezer Annan	(France) Saint-Étienne	Undisclosed	
8 August 2025	DF	(Serbia) Strahinja Stojković	(France) Saint-Étienne	Undisclosed	
1 September 2025	DF	(Serbia) Veljko Milosavljević	(England) AFC Bournemouth	£13,000,000	
29 October 2025	FW	(Nigeria) Peter Olayinka	Unattached	Released	
28 January 2026	FW	(Gabon) Shavy Babicka	(Turkey) Fatih Karagümrük	Loan	
2 February 2026	DF	(Serbia) Stefan Leković	(Portugal) C.F. Estrela da Amadora	Loan	
7 February 2026	DF	(Serbia) David Đurić	(Austria) Wolfsberger AC	Free transfer	
9 February 2026	MF	(Angola) Milson	(United Arab Emirates) Al Jazira Club	Loan	

== Competitions ==
=== Overall record ===
Competition	First match	Last match	Starting round	Final position	Record							
Competition	First match	Last match	Starting round	Final position	Pld	W	D	L	GF	GA	GD	Win %
Serbian SuperLiga	19 July 2025	22 May 2026	Matchday 1	Winners	37	27	5	5	100	31	+69	72.97
Serbian Cup	19 November 2025	13 May 2026	Round of 32	Winners	5	4	1	0	12	4	+8	80.00
UEFA Champions League	22 July 2025	26 August 2025	Second qualifying round	Play-off round	6	3	2	1	12	6	+6	50.00
UEFA Europa League	24 September 2025	26 February 2026	League phase	Knockout phase play-offs	10	5	2	3	8	8	+0	50.00
Total					58	39	10	9	132	49	+83	67.24

Source: FBREF

=== Serbian Superliga ===
==== League table ====
Pos	Team	Pld	W	D	L	GF	GA	GD	Pts	Qualification
1	Red Star Belgrade	30	24	3	3	87	23	+64	75	Qualification for the Championship round
2	Vojvodina	30	19	5	6	55	29	+26	62	Qualification for the Championship round
3	Partizan	30	19	4	7	62	39	+23	61	Qualification for the Championship round
4	Železničar	30	15	6	9	42	30	+12	51	Qualification for the Championship round
5	Novi Pazar	30	13	8	9	38	37	+1	47	Qualification for the Championship round

Source: Superliga
Rules for classification: 1) Points; 2) Head-to-head points; 3) Head-to-head goal difference; 4) Head-to-head goals scored; 5) Head-to-head away goals scored (if two teams tied); 6) Goal difference; 7) Goals scored; 8) Fair play ranking; 9) Draw.

==== Results summary ====
Overall								Home						Away					
Pld	W	D	L	GF	GA	GD	Pts	W	D	L	GF	GA	GD	W	D	L	GF	GA	GD
27	21	3	3	80	20	+60	66	11	1	1	47	6	+41	10	2	2	33	14	+19

==== Results by round ====
Round	1	2	3	4	5	6	7	8	9	10	11	12	13	14	15	16	17	18	19	20	21	22	23	24	25	26	27	28	29	30
Ground	H	H	A	H	A	H	A	H	A	H	A	H	A	H	A	A	A	H	A	H	A	H	A	H	A	H	A	H	A	H
Result	W	W	L	W	W	W	W	W	W	W	W	W	D	D	W	L	W	L	D	W	W	W	W	W	W	W	W	W	W	W
Position	1	1	1	1	1	2	2	2	1	1	1	1	1	1	1	1	1	2	2	2	1	1	1	1	1	1	1	1	1	1

Updated to match(es) played on 15 March 2026. Source: Srbija Sport
A = Away; H = Home; W = Win; D = Draw; L = Loss; P = Postponed

==== Matches ====
19 July 2025 1	Red Star Belgrade	4–0	Javor Ivanjica	Belgrade
20:00	Ivanić 6', 57'; Krunić 40'; Bruno Duarte 77' (pen.)	Report		Stadium: Red Star Stadium; Attendance: 12,000; Referee: Predrag Janjuš

26 July 2025 2	Red Star Belgrade	7–1	OFK Beograd	Belgrade
20:00	Ivanić 23'; Krunić 43'; Milson 43'; Bruno Duarte 56' (pen.); Katai 65', 70'; Kostov 89'	Report	Mituljikić 53'	Stadium: Red Star Stadium; Attendance: 10,000; Referee: Milan Ilić

9 August 2025 4	Red Star Belgrade	1–0	TSC	Belgrade
20:00	Katai 32'	Report		Stadium: Red Star Stadium; Attendance: 6,000; Referee: Danilo Nikolić

15 August 2025 5	Mladost Lučani	1–4	Red Star Belgrade	Lučani
20:00	Bondžulić 67'	Report	Lučić 45+3'; Katai 79' (pen.), 83', 88'	Stadium: SRC MR Radoš Milovanović

31 August 2025 7	Novi Pazar	1–5	Red Star Belgrade	Novi Pazar
19:30	King 62'	Report	Katai 2', 52'; Arnautović 18'; Ndiaye 85'; Ivanić 87'	Stadium: Novi Pazar City Stadium; Attendance: 0 Referee: Miloš Milanović

14 September 2025 8	Red Star Belgrade	7–1	Železničar Pančevo	Belgrade
17:00	Katai 3', 19' (pen.), 40'; Ivanić 43'; Radonjić 71'; Händel 82'; Lučić 87'	Report	Jasper 63'	Stadium: Red Star Stadium; Attendance: 8,000; Referee: Danilo Nikolić

20 September 2025 9	Partizan	1–2	Red Star Belgrade	Belgrade
19:00	Milošević 74'; Roganović (yellow card) 90'; A. Kostić (yellow card) 90+6'	Report	Elšnik 28'; Tiknizyan (yellow card) 47'; Radonjić 60'	Stadium: Partizan Stadium; Attendance: 22,000; Referee: Nenad Minaković

28 September 2025 10	Red Star Belgrade	2–1	Radnički 1923	Belgrade
19:00	Ivanić (yellow card) 35'; Bruno Duarte (red card) 44'; Leković 90'; Ivanić 90+6'	Report	Sokler 21'; Stojković (yellow card) 76'	Stadium: Red Star Stadium; Attendance: 5,000; Referee: Stefan Jeknić

5 October 2025 11	Napredak Kruševac	0–3	Red Star Belgrade	Kruševac
19:00	Laban (yellow card) 32'; Drobnjak (yellow card) 56'; Mihajlović (yellow card) 62'	Report	Damjanović (yellow card) 36'; Kostov 49' (pen.); Olayinka 82'; Zarić (yellow card) 89'; Seol 90+1'	Stadium: Mladost Stadium; Attendance: 3600; Referee: Novak Simović

19 October 2025 12	Red Star Belgrade	6–1	IMT	Belgrade
19:30	Arnautović 15'; Ivanić 23', 44', 53'; Kostov 71'; Milson (yellow card) 82'; Zarić 83'	Report	Casas (yellow card) 52'; Mitić 79'	Stadium: Red Star Stadium; Attendance: 0 Referee: Marko Ivković

26 October 2025 13	Radnički Niš	0–0	Red Star Belgrade	Niš
17:00	Mboup (yellow card) 8'; Ilić (yellow card) 14'; Nikolić (yellow card) 25'; Milosavljević (yellow card) 90+3'	Report	Seol (yellow card) 87'	Stadium: Čair Stadium; Attendance: 3000; Referee: Miloš Milanović

30 October 2025 3	Vojvodina	3–2	Red Star Belgrade	Novi Sad
18:00	Vidosavljević (yellow card) 39'; Mustapha 52'; Ranđelović 77'; Bukinac (yellow card) 83'; Kolarević (yellow card) 89', (goal) 90+2'; Sichenje (yellow card) 90+4'; Kokanović (yellow card) 90+10'	Report	Katai 42'; Ivanić 45+3'; Tikniyzan (yellow card) 65'	Stadium: Karađorđe Stadium; Attendance: 5,600; Referee: Pavle Ilić
Note: Game was originally scheduled on 2 August 2025, but was postponed to 30 October due to Red Star match in the UEFA Champions League

2 November 2025 14	Red Star Belgrade	1–1	Radnik Surdulica	Belgrade
17:00	Leković (yellow card) 25'; Katai 51'	Report	Jovanović 64'; Chinedu (yellow card) 64'; Trémoulet (yellow card) 67'; Abubakar (yellow card) 69'; Ranđelović (yellow card) 90+3'	Stadium: Red Star Stadium; Attendance: 0 Referee: Ivan Stamenković

9 November 2025 15	Spartak Subotica	2–3	Red Star Belgrade	Subotica
16:00	Tomović 64'; Osei 69'	Report	Kostov 31'; Uchenna 61'; Čejić 70' (o.g.)	Stadium: Subotica City Stadium; Attendance: 3,800

23 November 2025 16	Javor Ivanjica	1–0	Red Star Belgrade	Ivanjica
16:00	Krsmanović 84'	Report		Stadium: Stadion kraj Moravice; Attendance: 1,500

30 November 2025 17	OFK Beograd	3–4	Red Star Belgrade	Zaječar
18:30	Enem 11'; Pantović (yellow card) 26'; Petrović (yellow card) 26'; Kabić 19', 79'	Report	Elšnik 18'; Kostov 24'; Katai 65'; Ivanić 88'	Stadium: Kraljevica Stadium; Attendance: 2,000; Referee: Lazar Lukic

4 December 2025 6	Red Star Belgrade	3-0	Čukarički	Belgrade
19:00	Veljković 13'; Veljković (yellow card) 52'; Katai 54'; Bruno 60'; Uchenna (red card) 90'			Stadium: Red Star Stadium; Attendance: 2,000; Referee: Dejan Trifković
Note: Game was originally scheduled on 22 August 2025, but was postponed to 4 December due to Red Star match in the UEFA Champions League

12 December 2025 18	Red Star Belgrade	0–1	Vojvodina	Belgrade
17:00	Leković (yellow card) 68'	Report	Petrović 54'	Stadium: Red Star Stadium; Attendance: 8,126; Referee: Novak Simovic

15 December 2025 19	TSC	0–0	Red Star Belgrade	Bačka Topola
19:30	Radin (yellow card) 32'; Degenek (yellow card) 35'; Capan (yellow card) 45+3'; Singh (yellow card) 73'; Jovanović (yellow card) 74'; Mezei (yellow card) 77'; Jovičić (yellow card) 81'	Report	Tiknizyan (yellow card) 45+3'	Stadium: TSC Arena; Attendance: 3,000; Referee: Predrag Janjus

20 December 2025 20	Red Star Belgrade	4–0	Mladost Lučani	Belgrade
15:30	Stanković 34'; Ivanić 57'; Bruno 89'; Rodrigão 90+6'	Report		Stadium: Red Star Stadium; Attendance: 6,000; Referee: Marko Ivković

1 February 2026 21	Čukarički	1-3	Red Star Belgrade	Belgrade
15:00	Dzigbah (yellow card) 8'; Miladinović (yellow card) 28'; Cisse 45'		Duarte 11' (pen.), 32'; Avdic (yellow card) 63'; Kostov (yellow card) 65'; Rodrigao 79' (yellow card) 89'	Stadium: Čukarički Stadium; Attendance: 2,500; Referee: Milan Ilić

7 February 2026 22	Red Star Belgrade	5-0	Novi Pazar	Belgrade
16:00	Owusu 25'; Katai 54'; Kostov 58'; Rodrigao 72'; Enem (83 p)		Stanisavljević (yellow card) 30'; Davidović (yellow card) 50'; Togbe (yellow card) 68'; Brunčević (yellow card) 82'	Stadium: Red Star Stadium; Attendance: 6,000; Referee: Stanko Ostraćanin

14 February 2026 23	Železničar Pančevo	0-3	Red Star Belgrade	Pančevo
17:00	Jovanović (yellow card) 45'		Arnautović 29'; Eraković (yellow card) 55'; Kostov 59', 74'	Stadium: Stadion SC Mladost; Attendance: 2,500; Referee: Dejan Trifković

22 February 2026 24	Red Star Belgrade	3-0	Partizan	Belgrade
17:00	Kostov 45'; Arnautović 56'; Katai 78'; Krunić (yellow card) 80'		Milić (yellow card) 45'	Stadium: Red Star Stadium; Attendance: 45,277; Referee: Pavle Ilić

1 March 2026 25	Radnički 1923	0-2	Red Star Belgrade	Kragujevac
17:00	Sahli (yellow card) 88'; Kovačević (yellow card) 90'		Kostov 3'; Elšnik (yellow card) 10'; Enem 78'	Stadium: Čika Dača Stadium; Attendance: 6,500; Referee: Nenad Minakovic

8 March 2026 26	Red Star Belgrade	4-0	Napredak	Belgrade
16:00	Balević 3' (o.g.); Veljković 17'; Arnautović 21'; Katai 29'; Owusu (yellow card) 38'; Kostov (yellow card) 42'			Stadium: Red Star Stadium; Attendance: 16,207; Referee: Pavle Tomic

15 March 2026 27	IMT	1-2	Red Star Belgrade	Loznica
17:00	Karamoko 13'; Kiankaulua (yellow card) 63'		Kostov 40'; Katai 45'	Stadium: Lagator Stadium; Attendance: 4,500; Referee: Lazar Lukic

21 March 2026 28	Red Star Belgrade	2-0	Radnički Niš	Belgrade
16:00	Katai 45'; Bruno 68'			Stadium: Red Star Stadium; Attendance: 4,000; Referee: Marko Ivkovic

5 April 2026 29	Radnik Surdulica	1-2	Red Star Belgrade	Surdulica
17:00	Elšnik 23' (o.g.); Zorić (yellow card) 90'		Tiknizyan (yellow card) 23'; Katai 37'; Owusu 44'; Subotić (yellow card) 50'; Elšnik (yellow card) 85'	Stadium: Surdulica City Stadium; Attendance: 2,500; Referee: Srdjan Jovanovic

9 April 2026 30	Red Star Belgrade	3-2	Spartak Subotica	Belgrade
19:00	Katai 23', 44'; Enem 73'		Tomović 24'; Osei 54'; Subotić (yellow card) 85'	Stadium: Red Star Stadium; Attendance: 3,000; Referee: Nikola Radakovic

==== Season results round by round ====
Round	1	2	3	4	5	6	7
Ground	H	A	H	A	H	A	H
Result	W	D	W	W	L	D	L
Position	1	1	1	1	1	1	1

W = Win; D = Draw; L = Loss

==== Championship round matches ====
18 April 2026 31	Red Star Belgrade	4-1	Vojvodina	Belgrade
17:00	Katai 42'; Kostov 45'; Krunić (yellow card) 60'; Arnautović 69'; Enem 79'; Owusu (yellow card) 90'		Tanjga (red card); Sukačev 66'; Savićević (yellow card) 78'	Stadium: Red Star Stadium; Attendance: 10,000; Referee: Dejan Trifkovic

22 April 2026 32	Železničar Pančevo	2-2	Red Star Belgrade	Pančevo
19:00	Knežević 20'; Jasper 35' (yellow card) 45'; Sawadogo (yellow card) 46'		Bajo 18'; Uchenna (yellow card) 34'; Enem 60'	Stadium: Stadion SC Mladost; Attendance: 2,500; Referee: Lazar Lukic

26 April 2026 33	Red Star Belgrade	3-0	Partizan	Belgrade
18:00	Eraković 18' (yellow card) 38'; Avdić (yellow card) 36' (goal) 68'; Elšnik (yellow card) 84'; Seol 87'		Dragojević (yellow card) 16'; Natcho (yellow card) 79'; Seck (yellow card) 82'	Stadium: Red Star Stadium; Attendance: 25,714; Referee: Milos Milanovic

4 May 2026 34	Čukarički	1-2	Red Star Belgrade	Belgrade
19:00	Sissoko 37'; Maiga (red card); Miletić (yellow card) 90'		Bruno 27', 32' (pen.); Rodrigao (yellow card) 45'; Šarić (yellow card) 90'	Stadium: Čukarički Stadium; Attendance: 1,300; Referee: Aleksandar Zivkovic

9 May 2026 35	Red Star Belgrade	1-2	Novi Pazar	Belgrade
18:00	Arnautović 53'		Bačkulja (yellow card) 23'; Hadžimujović (yellow card) 24'; Manev (yellow card) 27'; Alić (yellow card) 66'; Kotzebue 75'; Dauda 90'; Samčović (yellow card) 90'; Mirosavić (yellow card) 90'	Stadium: Red Star Stadium; Attendance: 11,200; Referee: David Matic

17 May 2026 36	Radnik Surdulica	0-0	Red Star Belgrade	Surdulica
18:30	Lakić (yellow card) 51'; Kouadio (yellow card) 61'; Abubakar (yellow card) 80'; Kosiah (yellow card) 83'		Tiknizyan (yellow card) 54'	Stadium: Surdulica City Stadium; Attendance: 1,000; Referee: Milan Mitic

22 May 2026 37	Red Star Belgrade	1-2	OFK Beograd	Belgrade
20:00	Bruno 90'		Hoard 31'; Silue 59'; Pavlović (yellow card) 75'	Stadium: Red Star Stadium; Attendance: 20,000; Referee: Jovan Sergt

=== Serbian Cup ===
19 November 2025 Round of 32	Sloven	0–2	Red Star Belgrade	Ruma
13:00		Report	Radonjić 18'; Ivanić 57'	Stadium: Stadion u Borkovačkoj dolini Attendance: 2,500; Referee: Andrija Stojanović

11 February 2026 Round of 16	Budućnost Dobanovci	1–4	Red Star Belgrade	Dobanovci
13:00	Janjić 81'		Bruno 6' (pen.), 54'; Enem 9'; Händel 83'	Stadium: Stadion FK Budućnost; Attendance: 1,500; Referee: Jovan Segrt

5 March 2026 Quarter-finals	Novi Pazar	0–2	Red Star Belgrade	Novi Pazar
14:45			Tiknizyan 37'; Elšnik 50'	Stadium: Gradski stadion Novi Pazar; Attendance: 8,000; Referee: Danilo Nikolić

30 April 2026 Semi-finals	Jedinstvo	1–2	Red Star Belgrade	Ub
19:00	Paunović 43'		Uchenna 7'; Bruno 67'	Stadium: Stadion Dragan Džajić; Attendance: 2,500; Referee: Danilo Nikolic

13 May 2026 Final	Red Star Belgrade	2–2 (5–4 p)	Vojvodina	Loznica
20:00	Arnautović 53'; Rodrigao 90+7'		Szűcs 3'; Radosavljević 35'	Stadium: Lagator Stadium; Attendance: 6,000; Referee: Pavle Ilic
	Penalties
	Bruno (penalty scored); Händel (penalty scored); Krunić (penalty scored); Lučić (penalty missed); Enem (penalty scored); Rodrigao (penalty scored)		Medojević (penalty scored); Szűcs (penalty scored); Mladenović (penalty missed); Ranđelović (penalty scored); Kokanović (penalty scored); Mary (penalty missed)

=== UEFA Champions League ===
==== Second qualifying round ====
22 July 2025 First leg	Lincoln Red Imps (Gibraltar)	0–1	(Serbia) Red Star Belgrade	Europa Sports Park, Gibraltar (Note: Teams from Gibraltar play their home matches at Europa Sports Park, instead of the Victoria Stadium, due to renovation works.)
18:00		Report	Bruno Duarte 30'	Attendance: 622; Referee: Damian Kos (Poland)

29 July 2025 Second leg	Red Star Belgrade (Serbia)	5–1 (6–1 agg.)	(Gibraltar) Lincoln Red Imps	Red Star Stadium, Belgrade
21:00	Katai 8'; Ivanić 16'; Bruno Duarte 37'; Milson 44'; Ndiaye 75'	Report	De Barr 53'	Attendance: 31,241; Referee: António Nobre (Portugal)

==== Third qualifying round ====
6 August 2025 First leg	Lech Poznań (Poland)	1–3	(Serbia) Red Star Belgrade	Poznań Stadium, Poznań
20:30	Ishak 34'	Report	Krunić 9', 51'; Duarte 73'	Attendance: 39,743; Referee: Tobias Stieler (Germany)

12 August 2025 Second leg	Red Star Belgrade (Serbia)	1–1 (4–2 agg.)	(Poland) Lech Poznań	Red Star Stadium, Belgrade
21:00	Ndiaye 45+1' (pen.)	Report	Ishak 90+3'	Attendance: 45,371; Referee: François Letexier (France)

==== Play-off round ====
19 August 2025 First leg	Red Star Belgrade (Serbia)	1–2	(Cyprus) Pafos	Red Star Stadium, Belgrade
21:00	Duarte 58'	Report	Correia 1'; Pêpê 52' (pen.)	Attendance: 43,411; Referee: Alejandro Hernández Hernández (Spain)

26 August 2025 Second leg	Pafos (Cyprus)	1–1 (3–2 agg.)	(Serbia) Red Star Belgrade	Alphamega Stadium, Limassol (Note: Pafos played their home matches at the Alphamega Stadium in Limassol, instead of their regular stadium, the Stelios Kyriakides Stadium, in Paphos, which did not meet UEFA requirements.)
21:00 (22:00 UTC+3)	Jajá 89'	Report	Ivanić 60'	Attendance: 8,422; Referee: Michael Oliver (England)

=== UEFA Europa League ===
==== League phase ====
The draw for the league stage was held on 29 August 2025.

Pos	Team	Pld	W	D	L	GF	GA	GD	Pts	Qualification
13	(The Football Association) Nottingham Forest	8	4	2	2	15	7	+8	14	Advance to knockout phase play-offs (seeded)
14	(Football Association of the Czech Republic) Viktoria Plzeň	8	3	5	0	8	3	+5	14	Advance to knockout phase play-offs (seeded)
15	(Football Association of Serbia) Red Star Belgrade	8	4	2	2	7	6	+1	14	Advance to knockout phase play-offs (seeded)
16	(Royal Spanish Football Federation) Celta Vigo	8	4	1	3	15	11	+4	13	Advance to knockout phase play-offs (seeded)
17	(Hellenic Football Federation) PAOK	8	3	3	2	17	14	+3	12	Advance to knockout phase play-offs (unseeded)

Source: UEFA
Rules for classification: League phase tiebreakers

Round	1	2	3	4	5	6	7	8
Ground	H	A	A	H	H	A	A	H
Result	D	L	L	W	W	W	W	D
Position	19	26	30	26	22	17	12	15
Points	1	1	1	4	7	10	13	14

Source: UEFA
A = Away; H = Home; W = Win; D = Draw; L = Loss

Win Draw Loss Fixtures

24 September 2025 1	Red Star Belgrade (Serbia)	1–1	(Scotland) Celtic	Red Star Stadium, Belgrade
21:00 (20:00 UTC+1)	Arnautović 65'	Report	Iheanacho 55'	Attendance: 35,721; Referee: Radu Petrescu (Romania)

2 October 2025 2	Porto (Portugal)	2–1	(Serbia) Red Star Belgrade	Estádio do Dragão, Porto
21:00 (20:00 UTC+1)	Gomes 8' (pen.); Mora 89'	Report	Kostov 32'	Attendance: 42,812; Referee: Harm Osmers (Germany)

23 October 2025 3	Braga (Portugal)	2–0	(Serbia) Red Star Belgrade	Estádio Municipal, Braga
18:45 (17:45 UTC+1)	Navarro 22'; Dorgeles 72'	Report		Attendance: 10,056; Referee: Espen Eskås (Norway)

6 November 2025 4	Red Star Belgrade (Serbia)	1–0	(France) Lille	Red Star Stadium, Belgrade
18:45 (17:45 UTC+1)	Arnautović 85' (pen.)	Report		Attendance: 32,711; Referee: John Brooks

27 November 2025 5	Red Star Belgrade (Serbia)	1–0	(Romania) FCSB	Red Star Stadium, Belgrade
21:00 (20:00 UTC+1)	Duarte 50'	Report		Attendance: 26,054; Referee: Jérôme Brisard

11 December 2025 6	Sturm Graz (Austria)	0–1	(Serbia) Red Star Belgrade	Liebenauer Stadium, Graz
18:45 (17:45 UTC+1)		Report	Ivanić 55'	Attendance: 16,077; Referee: Damian Sylwestrzak

22 January 2026 7	Malmö FF (Sweden)	0–1	(Serbia) Red Star Belgrade	Stadion, Malmö
18:45		Report	Kostov 16'	Attendance: 16,852; Referee: Sascha Stegemann

29 January 2026 8	Red Star Belgrade (Serbia)	1–1	(Spain) Celta Vigo	Red Star Stadium, Belgrade
21:00	Duarte 89'	Report	López 88'	Attendance: 39,116; Referee: Andrea Colombo (Italy)

==== Knockout phase ====
===== Knockout phase play-offs =====
19 February 2026 First leg	Lille (France)	0–1	(Serbia) Red Star Belgrade	Villeneuve-d'Ascq, France
21:00 CET (UTC+1)	Correia (yellow card) 40'	Report	Tebo Uchenna 45+1'; Lučić (yellow card) 82'; Matheus (yellow card) 89'; Young-woo (yellow card) 89'	Stadium: Stade Pierre-Mauroy; Attendance: 22,087; Referee: Sven Jablonski (Germany)

26 February 2026 Second leg	Red Star Belgrade (Serbia)	0–2 (a.e.t.) (1–2 agg.)	(France) Lille	Belgrade, Serbia
18:45 CET (UTC+1)	Uchenna (yellow card) 36'; Händel (yellow card) 69'; Avdić (yellow card) 120+1'	Report	Giroud 4'; Bouaddi (yellow card) 52'; Ngoy 99'	Stadium: Rajko Mitić Stadium; Attendance: 46,477; Referee: Anthony Taylor (England)

== Statistics ==
=== Goal scorers ===
As of match played 20 December 2025

Rank	No.	Pos.	Player	Serbian SuperLiga	Serbian Cup	Champions League	Europa League	Total
1	10	MF	(Serbia) Aleksandar Katai	15	0	1	0	16
1	4	MF	(Montenegro) Mirko Ivanić	12	1	2	1	16
3	17	FW	(Brazil) Bruno Duarte	4	0	4	1	9
4	22	MF	(Serbia) Vasilije Kostov	5	0	0	1	6
5	33	MF	(Bosnia and Herzegovina) Rade Krunić	2	0	2	0	4
5	89	FW	(Austria) Marko Arnautović	2	0	0	2	4
7	9	FW	(Senegal) Cherif Ndiaye	1	0	2	0	3
7	49	MF	(Serbia) Nemanja Radonjić	2	1	0	0	3
9	7	MF	(Angola) Felício Milson	1	0	1	0	2
9	21	MF	(Slovenia) Timi Max Elšnik	2	0	0	0	2
9	37	MF	(Serbia) Vladimir Lučić	2	0	0	0	2
12	5	DF	(Brazil) Rodrigão	1	0	0	0	1
12	13	DF	(Serbia) Miloš Veljković	1	0	0	0	1
12	20	MF	(Portugal) Tomás Händel	1	0	0	0	1
12	24	DF	(Serbia) Nikola Stanković	1	0	0	0	1
12	25	DF	(Serbia) Stefan Leković	1	0	0	0	1
12	30	DF	(Nigeria) Franklin Tebo Uchenna	1	0	0	0	1
12	40	FW	(Serbia) Luka Zarić	1	0	0	0	1
12	66	DF	(South Korea) Seol Young-woo	1	0	0	0	1
Own goals				1	0	0	0	1
Totals				58	2	12	5	77

=== Clean sheets ===
As of match played 20 December 2025

Rank	No.	Pos.	Player	Serbian SuperLiga	Serbian Cup	Champions League	Europa League	Total
1	1	GK	(Brazil) Matheus	6	1	1	3	11
2	18	GK	(Israel) Omri Glazer	1	0	0	0	1
Totals				7	1	1	3	12
