= Douglas Owusu =

Ghanaian footballer (born 2006)

Personal information
- Full name: Douglas Owusu
- Date of birth: 10 April 2006 (age 20)
- Place of birth: Cape Coast, Ghana
- Height: 1.65 m (5 ft 5 in)
- Position: Winger

Team information
- Current team: Hapoel Tel Aviv

Senior career*
Years	Team	Apps	(Gls)
2023–2024	Asekem FC		
2024–2025	FK Radnik Surdulica	52	(9)
2026	Red Star Belgrade	12	(2)
2026–	Hapoel Tel Aviv	1	(1)
- * Club domestic league appearances and goals as of 4 September 2026

Douglas Owusu (born 10 April 2006) is a Ghanaian professional footballer who plays as a winger for Israeli Premier League club Hapoel Tel Aviv.

== Career ==
Owusu started his career with Ghanaian side Asekem FC. Following his stint there, he signed for Serbian side FK Radnik Surdulica ahead of the 2024–25 season, where he made fifty-two league appearances and scored nine goals and helped the club achieve promotion from the second tier to the top flight.

During January 2026, he signed for Serbian side Red Star Belgrade after receiving interest from Norwegian side FK Bodø/Glimt and Czech side FC Viktoria Plzeň.

In August 2026, after struggling for playing time at Red Star, Owusu joined Israeli club Hapoel Tel Aviv on a permanent transfer, passing a medical examination on 5 August 2026 ahead of the move. The transfer fee was reported at around €2.2 million, rising to roughly €2.5 million including agent fees, making him the most expensive signing in the club's history.

Owusu made his competitive debut for Hapoel Tel Aviv on 3 September 2026 in a 3–0 Israeli Premier League win over Beitar Jerusalem, coming on as a substitute for Loizos Loizou and scoring his first goal for the club in the 73rd minute, assisted by Emmanuel Boateng.

== Style of play ==
Owusu plays as a winger. Serbian news website Telegraf.rs wrote in 2026 that he is "an extremely fast and explosive player... with his movement, he poses a serious threat to opposing defenses... while showing a high level of technique, all of which was matched with speed".

== Career statistics ==
As of match played 3 September 2026

Appearances and goals by club, season and competition
Club	Season	League			Cup		Europe		Other		Total	
Club	Season	Division	Apps	Goals	Apps	Goals	Apps	Goals	Apps	Goals	Apps	Goals
FK Radnik Surdulica	2024–25	Serbian SuperLiga	32	2	2	0	—		—		34	2
FK Radnik Surdulica	2025–26	Serbian SuperLiga	20	7	0	0	—		—		20	7
FK Radnik Surdulica	Total		52	9	2	0	—		—		54	9
Red Star Belgrade	2025–26	Serbian SuperLiga	12	2	0	0	1 (Note: Appearance in UEFA Europa League)	0	—		13	2
Hapoel Tel Aviv	2026–27	Israeli Premier League	1	1	0	0	—		—		1	1
Career total			65	12	2	0	1	0	0	0	68	12

== Honours ==
Red Star

- Serbian SuperLiga: 2025–26
- Serbian Cup: 2025–26
