= Seol Young-woo =

South Korean footballer (born 1998)

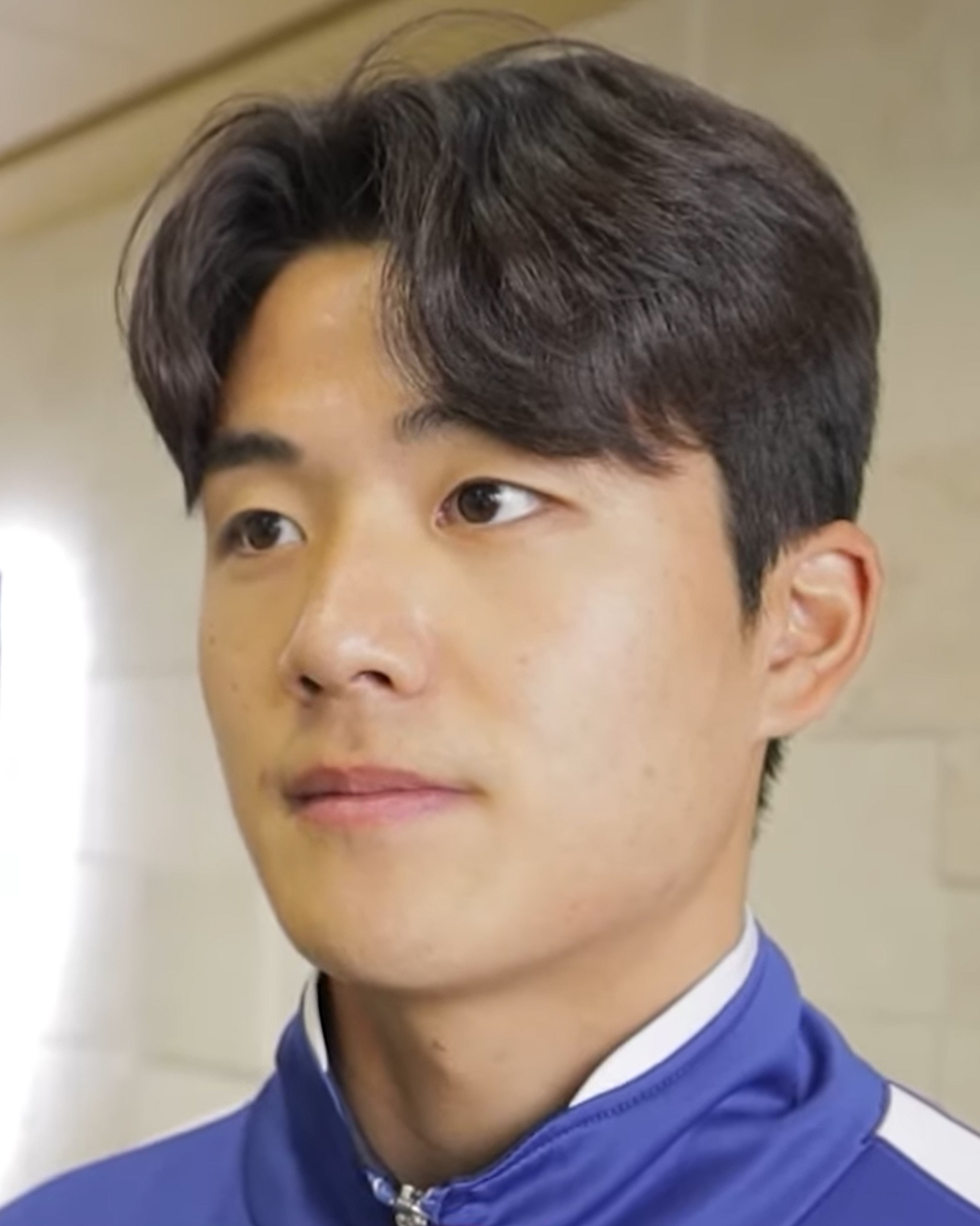
- Seol in 2022

Personal information
- Date of birth: 5 December 1998 (age 27)
- Place of birth: Ulsan, South Korea
- Height: 1.83 m (6 ft 0 in)
- Position: Full-back

Team information
- Current team: FC Augsburg
- Number: 7

Youth career
- 2011–2016: Ulsan Hyundai

College career
Years	Team	Apps	(Gls)
2017–2019	University of Ulsan		

Senior career*
Years	Team	Apps	(Gls)
2020–2024	Ulsan HD	120	(5)
2024–2026	Red Star Belgrade	64	(8)
2026–	FC Augsburg	6	(0)

International career^{‡}
2014	South Korea U17	4	(0)
2016	South Korea U20	1	(0)
2019	South Korea Universiade	4	(0)
2020–2023	South Korea U23	15 (Note: Includes seven appearances as an overage player in Asian Games.)	(0)
2023–	South Korea	41	(0)
Medal record
Men's football
Representing South Korea
Asian Games
Gold medal – first place	2022 Hangzhou
- * Club domestic league appearances and goals as of 18 October 2026 ‡ National team caps and goals as of 13 November 2026

- Seol Young-woo
- Hangul: 설영우
- Hanja: 薛英佑
- RR: Seol Yeongu
- MR: Sŏl Yŏngu
- IPA: [sʌl.ljʌŋ.u]

Seol Young-woo (Korean: 설영우; born 5 December 1998) is a South Korean professional footballer who plays as a full-back for Bundesliga club FC Augsburg and the South Korea national team.

== Club career ==
=== Ulsan HD ===
Born in Ulsan, Seol played as a youth player for hometown team Ulsan Hyundai (renamed Ulsan HD in 2024) since childhood. After attending university for a while, he played for the senior team of Ulsan Hyundai since 2020. He contributed to Ulsan's two K League 1 titles in 2022 and 2023. On 1 October 2024, he was nominated for the AFC Player of the Year for 2023 by helping his club and national team reach the semi-finals of the 2023–24 AFC Champions League and the 2023 AFC Asian Cup, respectively, in addition to the league title.

=== Red Star Belgrade ===
On 29 June 2024, Seol moved to Serbian SuperLiga club Red Star Belgrade for an undisclosed fee on a three-year contract with an option for a one-year extension. He provided three assists in eight league phase matches during his first UEFA Champions League season. For two years, he helped the club win two Doubles, and was selected for the league's Team of the Season twice.

=== FC Augsburg ===
On 27 August 2026, Seol signed a four-year contract until June 2030 with Bundesliga side FC Augsburg, becoming the fourth South Korean player in their history after Koo Ja-cheol, Ji Dong-won and Hong Jeong-ho.

== International career ==
=== 2023 Asian Cup ===
Seol was called up for the South Korea national team for the 2023 AFC Asian Cup. He underachieved in the group stage, and conceded a penalty against Malaysia. He provided an accurate cross, assisting Cho Gue-sung's equalising header in second-half stoppage time of the round of 16 match against Saudi Arabia. He showed tremendous workrate by moving 15.54 km in the quarter-final match against Australia and was selected for the team of the matchday after the match, although he took a rest for only two days after the round of 16. South Korea was eliminated in the semi-finals by Jordan, but found solace in a new full-back.

=== 2026 World Cup ===
At the 2026 FIFA World Cup, Seol played three Group A matches as a starter for South Korea under manager Hong Myung-bo. He was not seen in the highlights of a 2–1 win over Czech Republic despite attempting the most sprints at the team. He was criticised for making inaccurate passes and crosses and for being frequently ruled offside, when changing his position from right to left wing-back in a 1–0 loss to Mexico. He announced he would take legal action against profanities and insults directed at him just after a 1–0 loss to South Africa.

== Style of play ==
Seol had played as a winger until his university days, but changed his role to a full-back at the start of his professional career. He is a right-footed full-back, but could be deployed on both left and right flank.

== Career statistics ==
=== Club ===
As of 28 October 2026

Appearances and goals by club, season and competition
Club	Season	League			National cup (Note: Includes Korean FA Cup, Serbian Cup, DFB-Pokal)		Continental		Other		Total	
Club	Season	Division	Apps	Goals	Apps	Goals	Apps	Goals	Apps	Goals	Apps	Goals
Ulsan HD	2020	K League 1	14	0	2	0	6 (Note: Appearances in AFC Champions League)	0	—		22	0
Ulsan HD	2021	K League 1	31	2	3	0	2	0	2 (Note: Appearances in FIFA Club World Cup)	0	38	2
Ulsan HD	2022	K League 1	34	0	3	0	6	1	—		43	1
Ulsan HD	2023	K League 1	32	3	2	0	4	0	—		38	3
Ulsan HD	2024	K League 1	9	0	0	0	6	2	—		15	2
Ulsan HD	Total		120	5	10	0	24	3	2	0	156	8
Red Star Belgrade	2024–25	Serbian SuperLiga	30	6	3	0	10 (Note: Appearances in UEFA Champions League)	0	—		43	6
Red Star Belgrade	2025–26	Serbian SuperLiga	31	2	4	0	15 (Note: Five appearances in UEFA Champions League, ten appearances in UEFA Europa League)	0	—		50	2
Red Star Belgrade	2026–27	Serbian SuperLiga	3	0	0	0	5 (Note: Four appearances in UEFA Champions League, one appearances in UEFA Europa League)	0	—		8	0
Red Star Belgrade	Total		64	8	7	0	30	0	—		101	8
FC Augsburg	2026–27	Bundesliga	6	0	1	0	—		—		7	0
Career total			190	13	18	0	54	3	2	0	264	16

=== International ===
As of match played 13 November 2026

Appearances and goals by national team and year
National team	Year	Apps	Goals
South Korea	2023	7	0
South Korea	2024	15	0
South Korea	2025	8	0
South Korea	2026	11	0
Career total		41	0

== Honours ==
Ulsan Hyundai

- AFC Champions League: 2020
- K League 1: 2022, 2023

Red Star Belgrade

- Serbian SuperLiga: 2024–25, 2025–26
- Serbian Cup: 2024–25, 2025–26

South Korea U23

- Asian Games: 2022

Individual

- K League Young Player of the Month: September 2021, November 2021
- K League 1 Young Player of the Year: 2021
- Korean FA Young Player of the Year: 2021
- K League All-Star: 2023
- K League 1 Best XI: 2023
- K League Player of the Month: October–December 2023
- Serbian SuperLiga Team of the Season: 2024–25, 2025–26
