= Luka Zarić =

Serbian footballer (born 2008)

Personal information
- Full name: Luka Zarić
- Date of birth: 31 October 2008 (age 18)
- Place of birth: Užice, Serbia
- Height: 1.81 m (5 ft 11 in)
- Position: Winger

Team information
- Current team: Red Star Belgrade
- Number: 40

Youth career
- –2025: Red Star Belgrade
- 2024: → Grafičar (loan)

Senior career*
Years	Team	Apps	(Gls)
2025–	Red Star Belgrade	20	(1)
2025–2026	→ Grafičar (dual)	10	(1)

International career^{‡}
2024–2025	Serbia U17	8	(2)
2025–	Serbia U19	10	(4)
- * Club domestic league appearances and goals as of 22 May 2026 ‡ National team caps and goals as of 28 March 2026

Luka Zarić (Serbian Cyrillic: Лука Зарић; born 31 October 2008) is a Serbian professional footballer who plays as a winger for Red Star Belgrade.

== Career ==
=== Grafičar ===
On 2 August 2025, Zarić made his professional debut and scored his first goal in a Serbian First League match against FK Mačva Šabac.

=== Red Star Belgrade ===
On 14 August 2025, Zarić was promoted from the Red Star Belgrade U17 to the first team.

On 15 August 2025, Zarić made his first team debut in a Serbian SuperLiga match against FK Mladost Lučani.

On 21 August 2025, Zarić extended his contract with Red Star until 2028.

On 5 September 2025, Zarić was included in the B list squad for the 2025–26 UEFA Europa League league phase.

== Career statistics ==
As of match played 22 May 2026

Appearances and goals by club, season and competition
Club	Season	League			Serbian Cup		Europe		Total	
Club	Season	Division	Apps	Goals	Apps	Goals	Apps	Goals	Apps	Goals
Red Star Belgrade	2025–26	Serbian SuperLiga	20	1	3	0	1 (Note: Appearance in UEFA Europa League)	0	24	1
Grafičar (loan)	2025–26	Serbian SuperLiga	10	1	1	0	—		11	1
Career total			30	1	4	0	1	0	35	2

== Honours ==
Red Star

- Serbian SuperLiga: 2025–26
- Serbian Cup: 2025–26
