= Mahmudu Bajo =

Gambian footballer (born 2004)

Personal information
- Full name: Mahmudu Bajo
- Date of birth: 15 August 2004 (age 22)
- Place of birth: Keneba, The Gambia
- Height: 1.85 m (6 ft 1 in)
- Position: Defensive midfielder

Team information
- Current team: Red Star Belgrade
- Number: 6

Youth career
- –2021: RS Tallinding FC
- 2021–2023: Granada

Senior career*
Years	Team	Apps	(Gls)
2023–2024	Podbrezová	28	(0)
2024–2025	Dunajská Streda	33	(0)
2025–	Red Star Belgrade	25	(2)

International career^{‡}
2023	Gambia U20	9	(1)
2024–	Gambia	9	(0)
- * Club domestic league appearances and goals as of 21 November 2026 ‡ National team caps and goals as of 10 October 2025

Mahmudu Bajo (born 15 August 2004) is a Gambian professional footballer who plays as a defensive midfielder for Serbian SuperLiga club Red Star Belgrade.

== Club career ==
Born in Keneba, Gambia, Bajo started his football career at local club RS Tallinding FC before moving to Spanish club Granada. In 2023, Bajo signed a contract with the Niké liga club Podbrezová.

Bajo made his professional Niké Liga debut for Podbrezová against MFK Dukla Banská Bystrica on 28 July 2023.

On July 18 2024, Bajo joined another Slovak club, Dunajská Streda. He signed a four-year contract, until June 2028.

On 1 August 2025, Red Star Belgrade announced that had reached an agreement with Bajo on a four-year deal, with an option for one more year.

== International career ==
In 2023 he participated with Gambia U20 national team in the 2023 U-20 Africa Cup of Nations, and the 2023 FIFA U-20 World Cup.

In 2024 he made his debut for the Gambia national team.

== Career statistics ==
=== Club ===
As of match played 15 October 2026

Appearances and goals by club, season and competition
Club	Season	League			Cup		Europe		Other		Total	
Club	Season	Division	Apps	Goals	Apps	Goals	Apps	Goals	Apps	Goals	Apps	Goals
Podbrezová	2023–24	Slovak First Football League	28	0	4	0	—		—		32	0
Dunajská Streda	2024–25	Slovak First Football League	32	0	3	0	2 (Note: Appearances in UEFA Conference League)	0	—		37	0
Dunajská Streda	2025–26	Slovak First Football League	1	0	0	0	—		—		1	0
Dunajská Streda	Total		33	0	3	0	2	0	—		38	0
Red Star Belgrade	2025–26	Serbian SuperLiga	17	1	2	0	4 (Note: One appearance in UEFA Champions League, three appearances in UEFA Europa League)	0	—		23	1
Red Star Belgrade	2026–27	Serbian SuperLiga	8	0	0	0	3 (Note: Two appearances in UEFA Europa League, one appearance in UEFA Conference League)	0	—		11	0
Red Star Belgrade	Total		25	1	2	0	7	0	—		34	1
Career total			86	1	9	0	9	0	0	0	104	1

=== International ===
As of match played 10 October 2025

Appearances and goals by national team and year
National team	Year	Apps	Goals
Gambia	2024	4	0
Gambia	2025	5	0
Total		9	0

== Honours ==
Red Star

- Serbian SuperLiga: 2025–26
- Serbian Cup: 2025–26
