= Nemanja Radonjić =

Serbian footballer

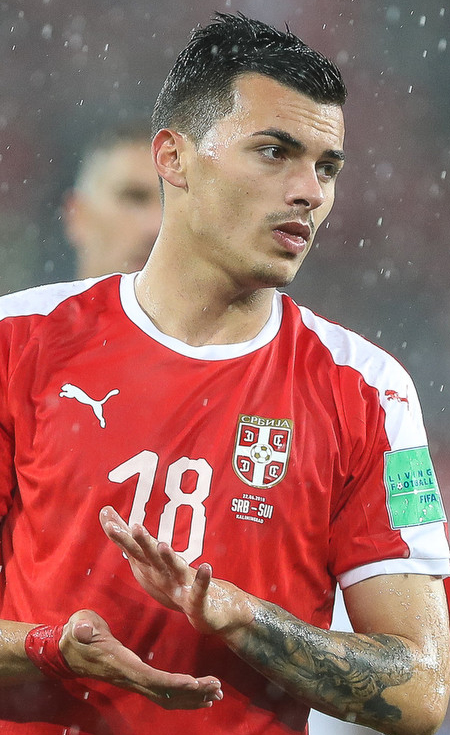
- Radonjić with Serbia at the 2018 FIFA World Cup

Personal information
- Full name: Nemanja Radonjić
- Date of birth: 15 February 1996 (age 30)
- Place of birth: Niš, Serbia, FR Yugoslavia
- Height: 1.82 m (6 ft 0 in)
- Position: Winger

Team information
- Current team: Čukarički
- Number: 28

Youth career
- Železničar Niš
- Medijana
- Radnički Niš
- –2013: Partizan
- 2013–2014: Gheorghe Hagi Academy
- 2014: → Roma (loan)
- 2014–2015: Empoli

Senior career*
Years	Team	Apps	(Gls)
2015–2017	Roma	0	(0)
2016–2017	→ Čukarički (loan)	27	(4)
2017–2018	Red Star Belgrade	28	(5)
2018–2023	Marseille	51	(7)
2021	→ Hertha BSC (loan)	12	(1)
2021–2022	→ Benfica (loan)	6	(0)
2022–2023	→ Torino (loan)	28	(2)
2023–2024	Torino	10	(3)
2024	→ Mallorca (loan)	11	(0)
2024–2026	Red Star Belgrade	31	(7)
2026–	Čukarički	0	(0)

International career^{‡}
2012–2013	Serbia U17	6	(5)
2013–2014	Serbia U18	5	(0)
2014–2015	Serbia U19	12	(4)
2016–2017	Serbia U20	3	(0)
2016–2019	Serbia U21	11	(0)
2017–	Serbia	46	(5)
- * Club domestic league appearances and goals as of 9 October 2026 ‡ National team caps and goals as of 16 November 2025

Nemanja Radonjić (Serbian Cyrillic: Немања Радоњић, pronounced [nêmaɲa rǎdoɲitɕ]; born 15 February 1996) is a Serbian professional footballer who plays as a winger for Čukarički and the Serbia national team.

== Club career ==
=== Early years ===
Born in Niš, Radonjić played in youth academy of the local club Radnički in his early years. Previously, he was a member of the local clubs Medijana and Železničar where he made his first football steps. As one of the best prospects in the academy, Radonjić moved to Partizan where he spent several, but later declared himself as a fan of the greatest opponent, Red Star Belgrade. Next he spent several months with Gheorghe Hagi Academy in Romania, before he signed a five-year contract with Roma in 2014, being loaned to Empoli for a season.

At the beginning of 2016, Radonjić returned to Serbia, and joined Čukarički as a loaned player. He scored a goal on his debut for Čukarički in the Serbian SuperLiga. In the next fixture match, against Jagodina, he scored a goal from around 30 meters long distance of a goal, and later made assist for another goal. Playing with Čukarički, Radonjić collected 31 appearances with 4 goals in all competitions until the end of 2016–17 season.

=== Red Star Belgrade ===
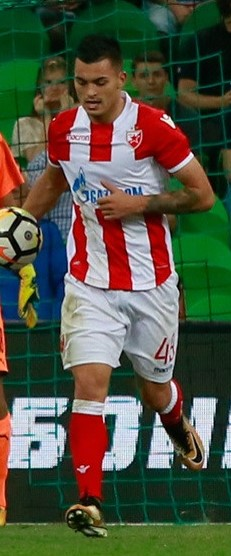
Radonjić playing for Red Star Belgrade in 2017

On 21 July 2017, Radonjić moved to Red Star Belgrade. He signed a five-year deal with his new club, being formally loaned until summer 2019, when his contract with Roma will end. He chose to wear the number 49 jersey at his new club. Radonjić made his debut for Red Star Belgrade in the first leg of the third qualifying round for 2017–18 UEFA Europa League, replacing Ricardo Cavalcante Mendes in the 61st minute of the match against Sparta Prague, played on 27 July 2017.

Radonjić scored his first goal for the club in the second leg of the play-off round for UEFA Europa League, in 2–1 victory against Krasnodar. Radonjić played his first eternal derby on 27 August 2017, replacing Aleksandar Pešić in the 67th minute of the match. Radonjić scored his second goal for Red Star in 1–1 draw to BATE Borisov on 14 September 2017.

Radonjić suffered a metatarsal bone fracture during the match against Rad on 18 November 2017. He became the third player in squad who injured in the same way since the beginning of the 2017–18 campaign, after Branko Jovičić and Vanja Vučićević. Returning to the field, Radonjić scored his first domestic league goal for Red Star Belgrade in the eternal derby match, played on 14 April 2018. Later, Radonjić scored four goals in five played matches until the end of season, including the last fixture match against Voždovac, when he won the first trophy in the professional career.

In May 2018, Radonjić was elected in the best 11 players for the 2017–18 Serbian SuperLiga season, by clubs captains' and managers' choice. On 25 July 2018, Radonjić scored a twice in the first leg of second qualifying round for the 2018–19 UEFA Champions League campaign, after which he was also named as a player of the match in 3–0 victory over Sūduva. Scoring in extra time of the match against Spartak Trnava on 14 August 2018, Radonjić secured the group stage of the 2018–19 UEFA Europa League campaign and play-off qualifying round for the Champions League, against Red Bull Salzburg. On 29 August 2018, Red Star purchased the deal from Roma, keeping Radonjić until June 2021.

=== Marseille ===
On 30 August 2018, Radonjić signed with French side Olympique de Marseille after helping qualify Red Star Belgrade for the group stage of the Champions League. He was assigned the number 7 jersey in his new club. The transfer fee was reported as €12 million plus 2 million in bonuses. Radonjić made his debut for the club in 4–0 Ligue 1 home victory over Guingamp on 16 September 2018, replacing Dimitri Payet in the 84th minute.

==== Loan to Hertha BSC ====
On 1 February 2021, Radonjić joined German side Hertha BSC on loan for the remainder of the 2020–21 season. While at Hertha BSC, Radonjić appeared in 12 games overall, scoring his first goal and getting his first assist in the same game against Freiburg. He played his last game for Hertha against TSG Hoffenheim before returning to France.

==== Loan to Benfica ====
He joined Benfica for the 2021-22 season on loan, he appeared in overall 11 games scoring one goal before returning back to France and being loaned out again, this time to Turin based club, Torino in Italy.

=== Torino ===
On 7 July 2022, Radonjić joined Serie A club Torino on loan from Marseille for the 2022–23 season. The deal included an option to make the move permanent for Torino, which was exercised at the end of the season.

==== Loan to Mallorca ====
On 31 January 2024, Radonjić was loaned by Mallorca in Spain.

=== Return to Red Star Belgrade ===
On 3 September 2024 Radonjić signed a two-plus-one-year contract with Red Star Belgrade, marking his return to the club after six years.

== International career ==
=== Youth ===
As a member of Serbian under-17 level, Radonjić scored five goals on six matches between 2012 and 2013, including a hat-trick in a match Belarus. Later, he had also been a member of the under-18 and under-19 national teams. Radonjić was called into the Serbia U20 national squad in November 2016 by coach Nenad Lalatović, when made his debut for the team in a match against Montenegro. As a coach of Serbia U21 selection, Nenad Lalatović also invited him to the squad for the 2017 UEFA European Under-21 Championship.

=== Senior ===
==== 2017–18: Debut and first FIFA World Cup ====
In November 2017, Radonjić was invited to Serbia senior national team for an Asia tour by caretaker Mladen Krstajić. He debuted in a friendly draw to South Korea the same year on 14 November, replacing Andrija Živković in 81 minute of the match.

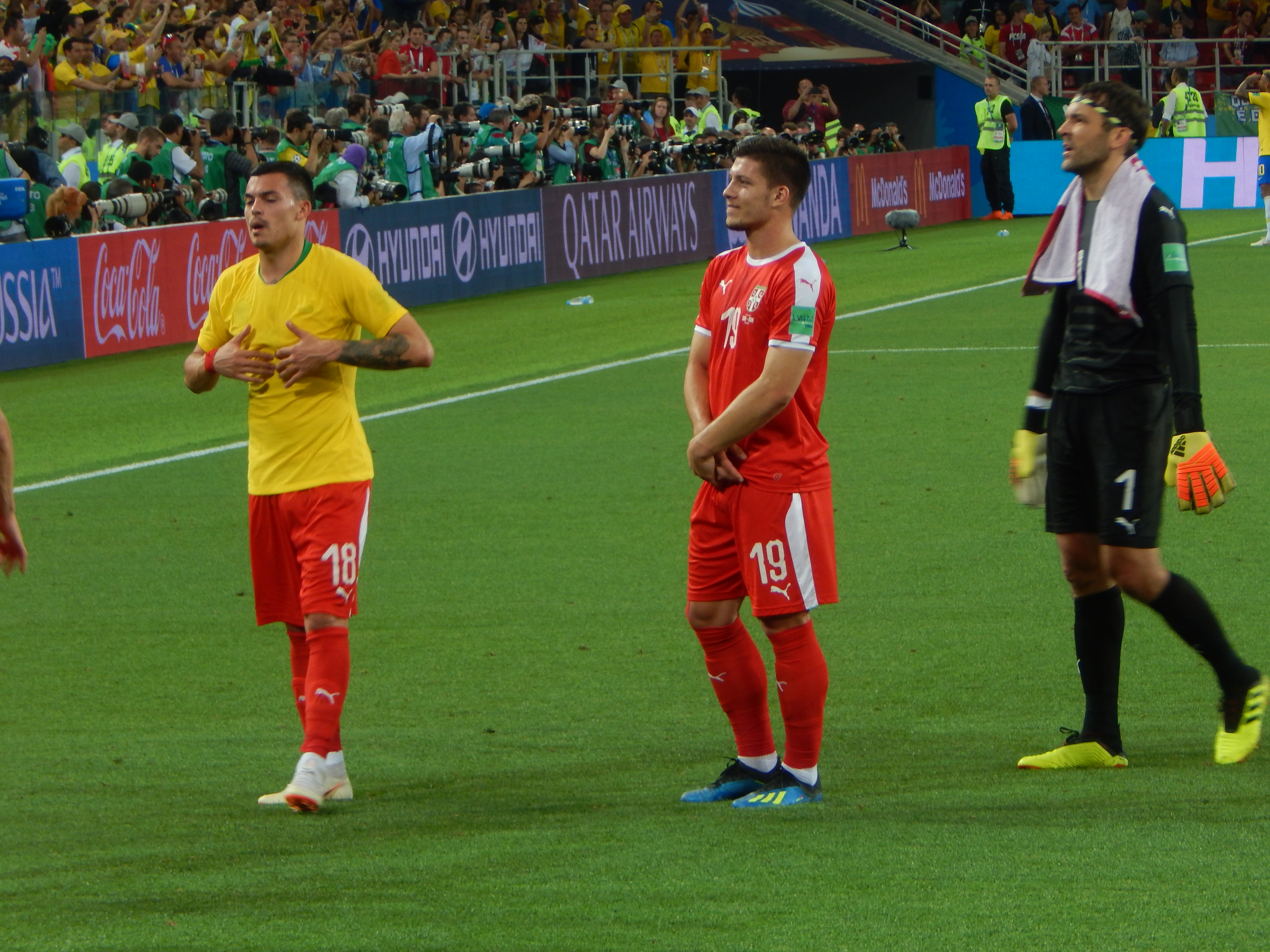
Radonjić, Jović and Stojković after the match against Brazil at the 2018 FIFA World Cup

In June 2018, Serbia manager Mladen Krstajić included Radonjić in the final 23-man squad for the 2018 FIFA World Cup. He appeared on two matches, against Switzerland and Brazil.

==== 2022: Second FIFA World Cup ====
In November 2022, he was selected in Serbia's squad for the 2022 FIFA World Cup held in Qatar. He played in all three group stage matches, against Brazil, losing 2–0 Cameroon, drawing 3–3 and Switzerland losing 3–2. Serbia finished fourth in the group.

== Career statistics ==
=== Club ===
As of match played 29 January 2026

Appearances and goals by club, season and competition
Club	Season	League			National cup (Note: Includes Serbian Cup, Coupe de France and Taça de Portugal.)		League cup (Note: Includes Coupe de la Ligue and Taça da Liga.)		Continental (Note: Includes UEFA Champions League and UEFA Europa League.)		Other (Note: Includes Trophée des Champions.)		Total	
Club	Season	Division	Apps	Goals	Apps	Goals	Apps	Goals	Apps	Goals	Apps	Goals	Apps	Goals
Čukarički (loan)	2015–16	Serbian SuperLiga	10	2	—		—		—		—		10	2
Čukarički (loan)	2016–17	Serbian SuperLiga	17	2	3	0	—		1 (Note: Appearances in UEFA Europa League)	0	—		21	2
Čukarički (loan)	Total		27	4	3	0	—		1	0	—		31	4
Red Star Belgrade	2017–18	Serbian SuperLiga	28	5	1	0	—		10	2	—		39	7
Red Star Belgrade	2018–19	Serbian SuperLiga	0	0	—		—		8 (Note: Appearances in UEFA Champions League)	4	—		8	4
Red Star Belgrade	Total		28	5	1	0	—		18	6	—		47	11
Marseille	2018–19	Ligue 1	17	0	1	0	0	0	4	0	—		22	0
Marseille	2019–20	Ligue 1	21	5	3	1	1	0	—		—		25	6
Marseille	2020–21	Ligue 1	12	2	0	0	—		2	0	1	0	15	2
Marseille	2021–22	Ligue 1	1	0	—		—		—		—		1	0
Marseille	Total		51	7	4	1	1	0	6	0	1	0	63	8
Hertha BSC (loan)	2020–21	Bundesliga	12	1	—		—		—		—		12	1
Benfica (loan)	2021–22	Primeira Liga	6	0	2	0	2	1	1	0	—		11	1
Torino	2022–23	Serie A	28	2	2	2	—		—		—		30	4
Torino	2023–24	Serie A	10	3	1	0	—		—		—		11	3
Torino	Total		38	5	3	2	—		—		—		41	7
Mallorca (loan)	2023–24	La Liga	11	0	3	0	0	0	0	0	—		14	0
Red Star Belgrade	2024–25	Serbian SuperLiga	21	5	3	1	—		4	3	—		28	9
Red Star Belgrade	2025–26	Serbian SuperLiga	10	2	1	1	—		5	0	—		16	3
Red Star Belgrade	Total		31	7	4	2	—		9	3	—		44	12
Career total			203	28	20	5	3	1	35	9	1	0	262	43

=== International ===
As of 16 Novembar 2025

Appearances and goals by national team and year
National team	Year	Apps	Goals
Serbia	2017	1	0
Serbia	2018	8	0
Serbia	2019	7	2
Serbia	2020	4	2
Serbia	2021	9	0
Serbia	2022	10	1
Serbia	2023	5	0
Serbia	2024	0	0
Serbia	2025	2	0
Total		46	5

Scores and results list Serbia's goal tally first, score column indicates score after each Radonjić goal.

List of international goals scored by Nemanja Radonjić
No.	Date	Venue	Opponent	Score	Result	Competition
1	10 September 2019	Stade Josy Barthel, Luxembourg City, Luxembourg	Luxembourg	2–0	3–1	UEFA Euro 2020 qualification
2	14 November 2019	Rajko Mitić Stadium, Belgrade, Serbia	Luxembourg	3–1	3–2	UEFA Euro 2020 qualification
3	15 November 2020	Puskás Aréna, Budapest, Hungary	Hungary	1–0	1–1	2020–21 UEFA Nations League B
4	18 November 2020	Rajko Mitić Stadium, Belgrade, Serbia	Russia	1–0	5–0	2020–21 UEFA Nations League B
5	5 June 2022	Rajko Mitić Stadium, Belgrade, Serbia	Slovenia	4–1	4–1	2022–23 UEFA Nations League B

== Honours ==
Red Star Belgrade

- Serbian SuperLiga: 2017–18, 2024–25, 2025–26
- Serbian Cup: 2024–25, 2025–26

Individual

- Serbian SuperLiga Team of the Season: 2017–18
