= Vladimir Lučić (footballer) =

Serbian footballer (born 2002)

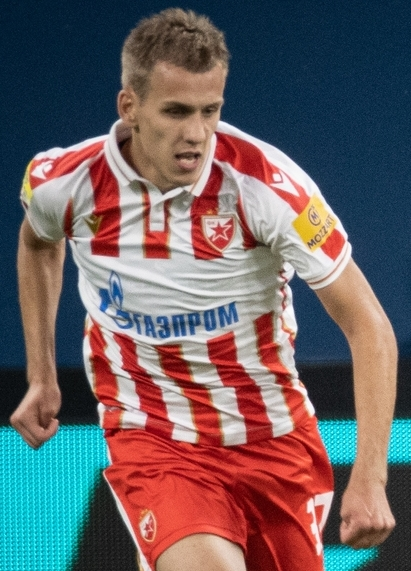
- Lučić with Red Star Belgrade in 2023

Personal information
- Full name: Vladimir Lučić
- Date of birth: 28 June 2002 (age 24)
- Place of birth: Belgrade, FR Yugoslavia
- Height: 1.85 m (6 ft 1 in)
- Position: Left winger

Team information
- Current team: Red Star Belgrade
- Number: 37

Youth career
- Red Star Belgrade
- 2019–2020: → Grafičar (loan)

Senior career*
Years	Team	Apps	(Gls)
2019–	Red Star Belgrade	54	(3)
2019–2020	→ Grafičar (loan)	1	(0)
2020–2022	→ IMT (loan)	67	(16)
2022–2023	→ Čukarički (loan)	28	(3)
2024–2025	→ IMT (loan)	25	(6)

International career^{‡}
2021	Serbia U20	1	(0)
2022–2023	Serbia U21	7	(3)
2023–	Serbia	5	(0)
- * Club domestic league appearances and goals as of 21 November 2026 ‡ National team caps and goals as of 23:10, 16 November 2026 (UTC)

Vladimir Lučić (Serbian Cyrillic: Владимир Лучић; born 28 June 2002) is a Serbian footballer who plays as a winger for Serbian SuperLiga club Red Star Belgrade.

== Club career ==
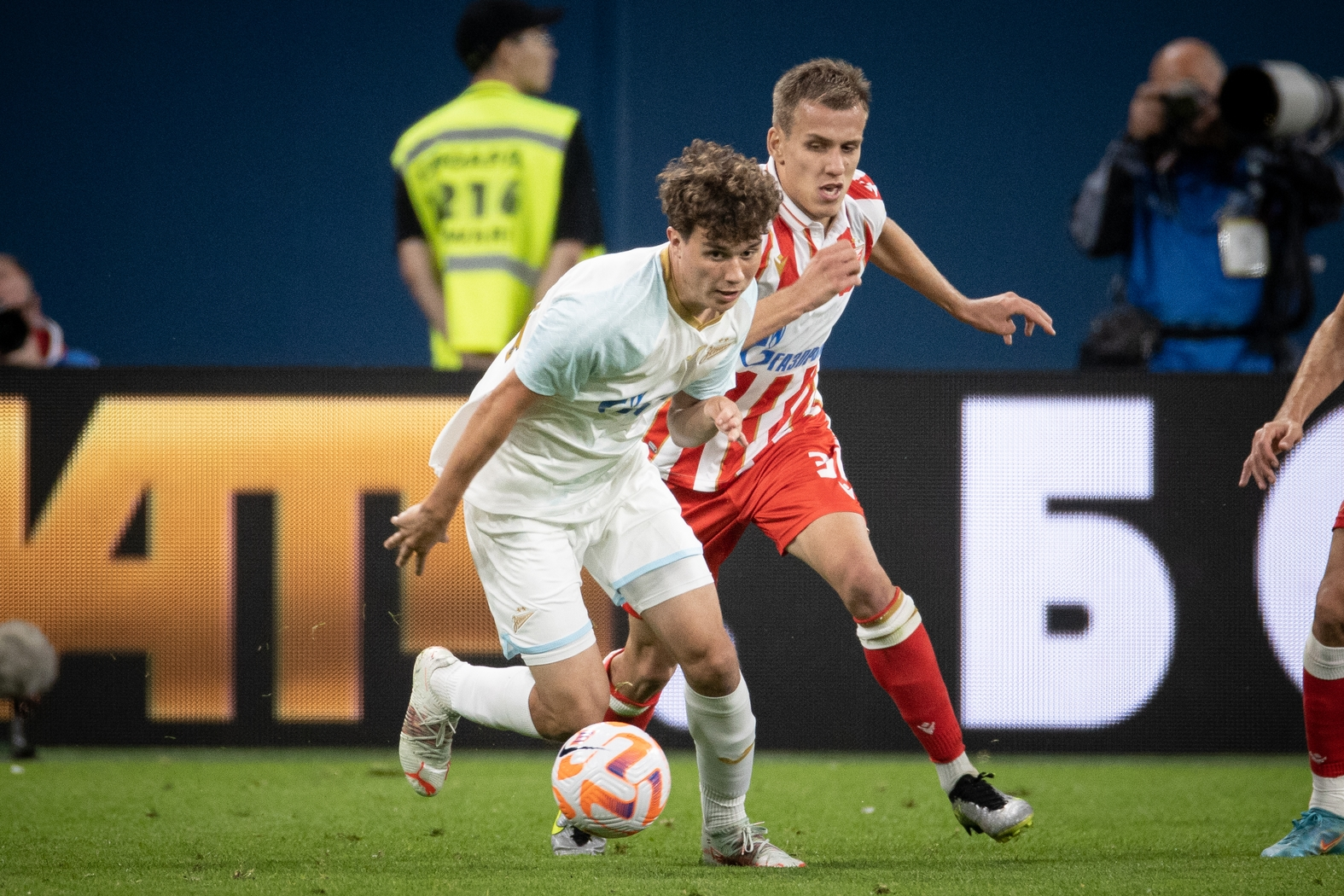
Lučić in action for Red Star Belgrade in 2023 against Zenit Saint Petersburg

Lučić is a Red Star Belgrade alumnus. In 2020, he began playing for the reserve team. In the summer of the same year, Lučić joined IMT on loan. On 16 August, in a match against Radnički Sremska Mitrovica, he made his debut in the Serbian First League. On 22 August, in a match against Grafičar, Lučić scored his first goal for IMT. At the end of the loan, Lučić returned to Red Star Belgrade. On 10 July 2022, in a match against Radnički Niš, he made his debut in the Serbian SuperLiga.

In 2022, Lučić was loaned to Čukarički. On 31 July, in a match against Mladost Novi Sad, he made his debut for the new team. On 15 August, in a match against Radnički 1923, Lučić scored his first goal for Čukarički.

In 2023, Lučić returned from loan to Red Star Belgrade. On July 30, in a match against Vojvodina, Lučić scored his first goal for the club.

== International career ==
Lučić debuted for the Serbia U21 national team on 6 June 2021 in a friendly match against Russia U21.

Lučić made his debut for the Serbia national football team on 25 January 2023 in a friendly match against the United States. Serbia won the game 2–1, with Lučić being a starter.

== Career statistics ==
=== Club ===
As of match played 15 October 2026

Appearances and goals by club, season and competition
Club	Season	League			Serbian Cup		Europe		Total	
Club	Season	Division	Apps	Goals	Apps	Goals	Apps	Goals	Apps	Goals
Grafičar Beograd (loan)	2019–20	Serbian First League	1	0	0	0	—		1	0
IMT (loan)	2020–21	Serbian First League	31	4	3	0	—		34	3
IMT (loan)	2021–22	Serbian First League	36	12	2	1	—		38	13
IMT (loan)	Total		67	16	5	1	—		72	16
Red Star Belgrade	2022–23	Serbian SuperLiga	2	0	0	0	0	0	2	0
Red Star Belgrade	2023–24	Serbian SuperLiga	23	1	1	1	6	0	30	2
Red Star Belgrade	2025–26	Serbian SuperLiga	21	2	4	0	6	0	31	2
Red Star Belgrade	2026–27	Serbian SuperLiga	5	0	0	0	2	0	7	0
Red Star Belgrade	Total		51	3	5	1	14	0	70	4
Čukarički (loan)	2022–23	Serbian SuperLiga	28	3	3	0	2	0	33	3
FK IMT (loan)	2024–25	Serbian SuperLiga	25	6	2	0	—		27	6
Career total			172	28	15	2	16	0	203	30

=== International ===
As of 16 November 2026

Appearances and goals by national team and year
National team	Year	Apps	Goals
Serbia	2023	1	0
Serbia	2024	0	0
Serbia	2025	0	0
Serbia	2026	4	0
Total		5	0

== Honours ==
Red Star

- Serbian SuperLiga: 2023–24, 2025–26
- Serbian Cup: 2023–24, 2025–26
