= Adem Avdić =

Serbian footballer (born 2007)

Personal information
- Full name: Adem Avdić
- Date of birth: 24 September 2007 (age 19)
- Place of birth: Loznica, Serbia
- Height: 1.73 m (5 ft 8 in)
- Position: Left-back

Team information
- Current team: Red Star Belgrade
- Number: 71

Youth career
- 2022: Red Star Belgrade

Senior career*
Years	Team	Apps	(Gls)
2024–	Red Star Belgrade	25	(1)
2025	→ OFK Beograd (loan)	8	(0)
2025	→ Grafičar (dual)	4	(0)

International career^{‡}
2021	Serbia U15	2	(0)
2022–2023	Serbia U16	7	(0)
2023–2024	Serbia U17	11	(0)
2025–	Serbia U19	6	(0)
2025–	Serbia U21	2	(0)
2026–	Serbia	2	(0)
- * Club domestic league appearances and goals as of 9 May 2026 ‡ National team caps and goals as of 5 June 2026

Adem Avdić (Serbian Cyrillic: Адем Авдић; born 24 September 2007) is a Serbian professional footballer who plays as a left-back for Red Star Belgrade.

== Personal life ==
Avdić is the son of Serbian former professional footballer Rašid Avdić. He was born in Loznica.

== Club career ==
Avdić is a graduate of the Red Star Belgrade youth football academy, On 5 April 2024, Adem was promoted to the first team from Red Star Belgrade U-19.

On 30 September 2024, he extended his contract with Red Star Belgrade until 2027.

On 31 January 2025, he was loaned from Red Star Belgrade to OFK Beograd until the end of the 2024–25 season.

On 3 February 2025, he made his debut for OFK Beograd, appearing in the main squad in a Serbian SuperLiga match against Radnički 1923.

== International career ==
Avdic played for the Serbia U16 and Serbia U17. Avdić is eligible to represent Bosnia and Herzegovina through his father.

== Career statistics ==
As of 9 May 2026

Appearances and goals by club, season and competition
Club	Season	League			Cup		Europe		Total	
Club	Season	Division	Apps	Goals	Apps	Goals	Apps	Goals	Apps	Goals
Red Star Belgrade	2023–24	Serbian SuperLiga	0	0	0	0	—		0	0
Red Star Belgrade	2025–26	Serbian SuperLiga	25	1	3	0	3 (Note: Appearances in UEFA Europa League)	0	31	1
Red Star Belgrade	Total		25	1	3	0	3	0	31	1
OFK Beograd (loan)	2024–25	Serbian SuperLiga	8	0	—		—		8	0
Grafičar (loan)	2025–26	Serbian First League	4	0	—		—		4	0
Career total			37	1	3	0	3	0	43	1

== Honours ==
Red Star

- Serbian SuperLiga: 2025–26
- Serbian Cup: 2025–26
