= Vasilije Kostov =

Serbian footballer (born 2008)

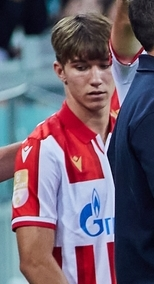
- Kostov in 2025

Personal information
- Date of birth: 11 May 2008 (age 18)
- Place of birth: Belgrade, Serbia
- Height: 1.76 m (5 ft 9 in)
- Position: Attacking midfielder

Team information
- Current team: Red Star Belgrade
- Number: 22

Youth career
- 2014–2016: ŠF Royal FC
- 2016–2025: Red Star Belgrade

Senior career*
Years	Team	Apps	(Gls)
2025–	Red Star Belgrade	51	(16)

International career^{‡}
2022	Serbia U15	2	(0)
2023–2024	Serbia U16	3	(3)
2024	Serbia U17	9	(5)
2024–	Serbia U19	9	(1)
2025–	Serbia	5	(0)
- * Club domestic league appearances and goals as of 21 November 2026 ‡ National team caps and goals as of 13 November 2026

Vasilije Kostov (Serbian Cyrillic: Василије Костов, born 11 May 2008) is a Serbian professional footballer who plays as an attacking midfielder for Red Star Belgrade and the Serbia national team.

== Early life ==
Kostov first played football at the age of six for ŠF Royal FC, and in 2016, after two and a half years arrived at the Red Star Belgrade youth school and went through all the younger categories. Kostov also stood out for his phenomenal shot from distance, scoring a goal in the youth eternal derby against Partizan, which ended in a victory for Red Star. Despite being one of the youngest footballers on the field, Kostov took on the responsibility and with a goal from the penalty spot, an attractive panenka. On 14 November 2024, Kostov extended his contract with Red Star until 2027.

== Club career ==
On 3 January 2025, Kostov was promoted to the first team from Red Star Belgrade U19 team. On 16 January, Kostov made his debut for the first team in a friendly match in Antalya against OFK Beograd. On 26 February, Kostov was first included in the club's main team's roster for the Serbian SuperLiga match against Železničar Pančevo, but did not play. On 6 April, Kostov made his debut in the Serbian SuperLiga championship, coming on as a substitute in the match against OFK Beograd. On 2 October, Kostov scored his first UEFA Europa League goal at the age of 17 years, 4 months and 21 days in the league phase match against Porto – becoming the youngest scorer in the European competition of Red Star. On 31 October, Kostov extended his contract with Red Star until 2028.

On 22 February 2026, Kostov scored his first goal in the Eternal derby at the age of 17 years, 9 months and 11 days in the Serbian SuperLiga match against Partizan Belgrade – becoming the youngest scorer in the Eternal derby.

== International career ==
On 11 October 2025, Kostov made his debut for the Serbia national team at the age of 17 years and 5 months in the 2026 FIFA World Cup qualification – UEFA Group K match against Albania.

== Personal life ==
On 14 October 2025, Kostov was named for The Guardian's Next Generation 2025.

== Career statistics ==
=== Club ===
As of match played 8 November 2026

Appearances and goals by club, season and competition
Club	Season	League			Serbian Cup		Europe		Other		Total	
Club	Season	Division	Apps	Goals	Apps	Goals	Apps	Goals	Apps	Goals	Apps	Goals
Red Star Belgrade	2024–25	Serbian SuperLiga	3	0	0	0	0	0	—		3	0
Red Star Belgrade	2025–26	Serbian SuperLiga	37	12	4	2	7 (Note: One appearance in UEFA Champions League, six appearances and one goal in UEFA Europa League)	0	—		48	14
Red Star Belgrade	2026–27	Serbian SuperLiga	10	4	0	0	6 (Note: Three appearances in UEFA Champions League, two appearances in UEFA Europa League, one appearance in UEFA Conference League)	1	—		16	5
Red Star Belgrade	Total		50	16	4	2	13	2	—		67	19
Career total			50	16	4	2	13	2	0	0	67	19

=== International ===
As of 13 November 2026

Appearances and goals by national team and year
National team	Year	Apps	Goals
Serbia	2025	1	0
Serbia	2026	4	0
Total		5	0

== Honours ==
Red Star

- Serbian SuperLiga: 2025–26
- Serbian Cup: 2025–26

Individual

- UEFA European Under-17 Championship Team of the Tournament: 2024
