= Aleksa Damjanović =

Serbian footballer (born 2008)

Personal information
- Date of birth: 4 December 2008 (age 17)
- Place of birth: Belgrade, Serbia
- Height: 1.99 m (6 ft 6 in)
- Position: Striker

Team information
- Current team: Bayer Leverkusen

Youth career
- –2025: Red Star Belgrade

Senior career*
Years	Team	Apps	(Gls)
2025–2026	Red Star Belgrade	7	(0)
2025–2026	→ Grafičar (dual)	18	(0)
2026–	Bayer Leverkusen	0	(0)

International career^{‡}
2022	Serbia U15	5	(1)
2023–2024	Serbia U16	3	(3)
2024–2025	Serbia U17	16	(5)
2025–	Serbia U19	12	(1)
- * Club domestic league appearances and goals as of 14 May 2026 ‡ National team caps and goals as of 5 July 2026

Aleksa Damjanović (Serbian Cyrillic: Алекса Дамјановић; born 4 December 2008) is a Serbian professional footballer who plays as a striker for German Bundesliga club Bayer Leverkusen.

== Club career ==
Damjanović was the top scorer in the Serbian Youth League with 21 goals in the 2024–25 season. That season, he also featured in the UEFA Youth League for Red Star Belgrade U-19. Having trained with the first-team in the pre-season ahead of the 2025–26 season as a 16-year-old, he made his senior debut in the Serbian SuperLiga for Red Star Belgrade against FK TSC on 9 August 2025 in a 1–0 home win for his side. He agreed a dual registration deal, making him eligible to play for RFK Grafičar Beograd in the Serbian First League during the 2025–26 season. In September 2025, he signed a new three-year contract with Red Star.

On 13 February 2026, it was announced that he would transfer to Bayer Leverkusen at the start of the 2026–27 season.

== International career ==
He is youth international for Serbia, representing Serbia national under-17 football team.

== Career statistics ==
As of match played 20 December 2025

Appearances and goals by club, season and competition
Club	Season	League			Serbian Cup		Europe		Other		Total	
Club	Season	Division	Apps	Goals	Apps	Goals	Apps	Goals	Apps	Goals	Apps	Goals
Red Star Belgrade	2025–26	Serbian SuperLiga	7	0	0	0	0	0	—		7	0
Grafičar (loan)	2025–26	Serbian First League	6	0	1	1	—		—		7	1
Career total			13	0	1	1	0	0	0	0	14	1

== Honours ==
Red Star

- Serbian SuperLiga: 2025–26
- Serbian Cup: 2025–26

== Personal life ==
Born in Belgrade, he is the son of Serbian international footballer Jovan Damjanović.
