= Tomás Händel =

Portuguese footballer

Personal information
- Full name: Tomás Romano Pereira dos Santos Händel
- Date of birth: 27 November 2000 (age 25)
- Place of birth: Guimarães, Portugal
- Height: 1.80 m (5 ft 11 in)
- Position: Midfielder

Team information
- Current team: Red Star Belgrade
- Number: 20

Youth career
- 2009–2010: Moreirense
- 2010–2019: Vitória Guimarães

Senior career*
Years	Team	Apps	(Gls)
2019–2023	Vitória Guimarães B	34	(5)
2021–2025	Vitória Guimarães	91	(5)
2025–	Red Star Belgrade	38	(3)

International career
2021	Portugal U21	3	(0)
- * Club domestic league appearances and goals as of 21 November 2026

Tomás Romano Pereira dos Santos Händel (born 27 November 2000) is a Portuguese professional footballer who plays as a midfielder for Serbian SuperLiga club Red Star Belgrade.

== Club career ==
=== Vitória Guimarães ===
Born in Guimarães of Austrian descent through his grandmother, Händel was a youth player at local clubs Moreirense F.C. and Vitória de Guimarães. He signed his first professional contract with the latter on 27 March 2019, lasting until 2023 and with a buyout clause of €15 million; on 24 June 2021, having started his senior career with the reserve team in the third division he extended the link to 2026 and increased the clause to €50 million.

Händel made his competitive debut with the main squad on 26 July 2021, in a 4–1 home win against Leixões S.C. in the first round of the Taça da Liga where he played the full 90 minutes. His first Primeira Liga appearance took place on 22 August, the entirety of a 4–0 victory over F.C. Vizela also at the Estádio D. Afonso Henriques.

Händel suffered a left thigh injury in February 2022, ruling him out of the rest of the season and the start of the next. After two games back in the reserves, he made his comeback on 18 March 2023 as a substitute in a 5–1 loss at S.L. Benfica. On 14 May, he scored his first goal for the first team as the only at Rio Ave F.C. to guarantee a place in the UEFA Europa Conference League with two fixtures remaining.

During his tenure, Händel made 118 competitive appearances, scored six goals and provided as many assists.

=== Red Star ===
On 2 September 2025, Red Star Belgrade announced that they had reached an agreement with Händel on a four-year deal; a €3.1 million fee was agreed, and Vitória remained entitled to 20% of any future transfer. He scored on his Serbian SuperLiga debut 12 days later, in a 7–1 home rout of FK Železničar Pančevo. He won a double in his first season.

== International career ==
Händel was called up to the Portugal under-19 team in February 2019, but was not capped until playing three games for the under-21s in late 2021, starting in a 1–0 win over Belarus for the 2023 UEFA European Championship qualifiers in Amadora on 6 September.

== Career statistics ==
As of match played 26 October 2026

Appearances and goals by club, season and competition
Club	Season	League			National cup		League Cup		Europe		Other		Total	
Club	Season	Division	Apps	Goals	Apps	Goals	Apps	Goals	Apps	Goals	Apps	Goals	Apps	Goals
Vitória Guimarães B	2019–20	Campeonato de Portugal	8	0	—		—		—		—		8	0
Vitória Guimarães B	2020–21	Campeonato de Portugal	24	3	—		—		—		—		24	3
Vitória Guimarães B	2022–23	Liga 3	2	2	—		—		—		—		2	2
Vitória Guimarães B	Total		34	5	—		—		—		—		34	5
Vitória Guimarães	2021–22	Primeira Liga	16	0	1	0	2	0	—		—		19	0
Vitória Guimarães	2022–23	Primeira Liga	9	1	0	0	0	0	—		—		9	1
Vitória Guimarães	2023–24	Primeira Liga	31	2	6	1	0	0	2 (Note: Appearances in UEFA Conference League)	0	—		39	3
Vitória Guimarães	2024–25	Primeira Liga	32	2	3	0	1	0	12	0	—		48	2
Vitória Guimarães	2025–26	Primeira Liga	3	0	0	0	0	0	0	0	—		3	0
Vitória Guimarães	Total		91	5	10	1	3	0	14	0	—		118	6
Red Star Belgrade	2025–26	Serbian SuperLiga	28	1	3	1	—		9 (Note: Appearances in UEFA Europa League)	0	—		40	2
Red Star Belgrade	2026–27	Serbian SuperLiga	8	2	0	0	—		1	0	—		9	2
Red Star Belgrade	Total		36	3	3	1	—		10	0	—		49	4
Career total			161	13	13	2	3	0	24	0	0	0	201	15

== Honours ==
Red Star

- Serbian SuperLiga: 2025–26
- Serbian Cup: 2025–26
