= Diogo Bezerra =

Brazilian footballer (born 2002)

Personal information
- Full name: Diogo Bezerra de Oliveira
- Date of birth: 16 July 2002 (age 24)
- Place of birth: Vitória, Brazil
- Height: 1.86 m (6 ft 1 in)
- Position: Right winger

Team information
- Current team: Rio Ave
- Number: 7

Youth career
- 2018: Porto Vitória
- 2019–2021: Atlético Mineiro
- 2021–2022: Ferroviária
- 2023: Red Bull Bragantino

Senior career*
Years	Team	Apps	(Gls)
2021–2022	Ferroviária	5	(0)
2023–2024	Red Bull Bragantino II	28	(4)
2024	Porto Vitória	0	(0)
2024–2025	Mura	9	(0)
2025	OFK Beograd	35	(5)
2026–	Rio Ave	24	(1)
- * Club domestic league appearances and goals as of 21:03, 8 October 2026 (UTC)

Diogo Bezerra de Oliveira (born 16 July 2002) is a Brazilian professional footballer who plays as a right winger for Portuguese club Rio Ave.

== Career ==
Born in Vitória in the state of Espírito Santo, Bezerra began playing as a youth for local Porto Vitória before joining Atlético Mineiro. He made his first senior appearances with Ferroviária in the Campeonato Brasileiro Série D and Red Bull Bragantino II in the Campeonato Paulista Série A3. He returned to Porto Vitória in 2024, winning the Copa Espírito Santo.

In September 2024, Bezerra moved to Europe by joining Mura in the Slovenian PrvaLiga on a two-year deal. By January, it was reported that he wanted to return to Brazil, due to isolation from only speaking Portuguese. Instead, he signed for OFK Beograd in the Serbian SuperLiga in February. He contributed two goals and eight assists in 20 games in the first half of the 2025–26 season.

On 13 January 2026, Bezerra was signed by Rio Ave in the Primeira Liga in Portugal. He joined on a deal until June 2030 for a fee reported in Serbia as €1.8 million. He played 17 games in his first half-season in Vila do Conde, scoring once on 11 May in the penultimate game of the season, a consolation in a 4–1 home loss to Sporting CP. He was then a transfer target for Wolverhampton Wanderers in the EFL Championship.
