= Mirko Ivanić =

Montenegrin footballer (born 1993)

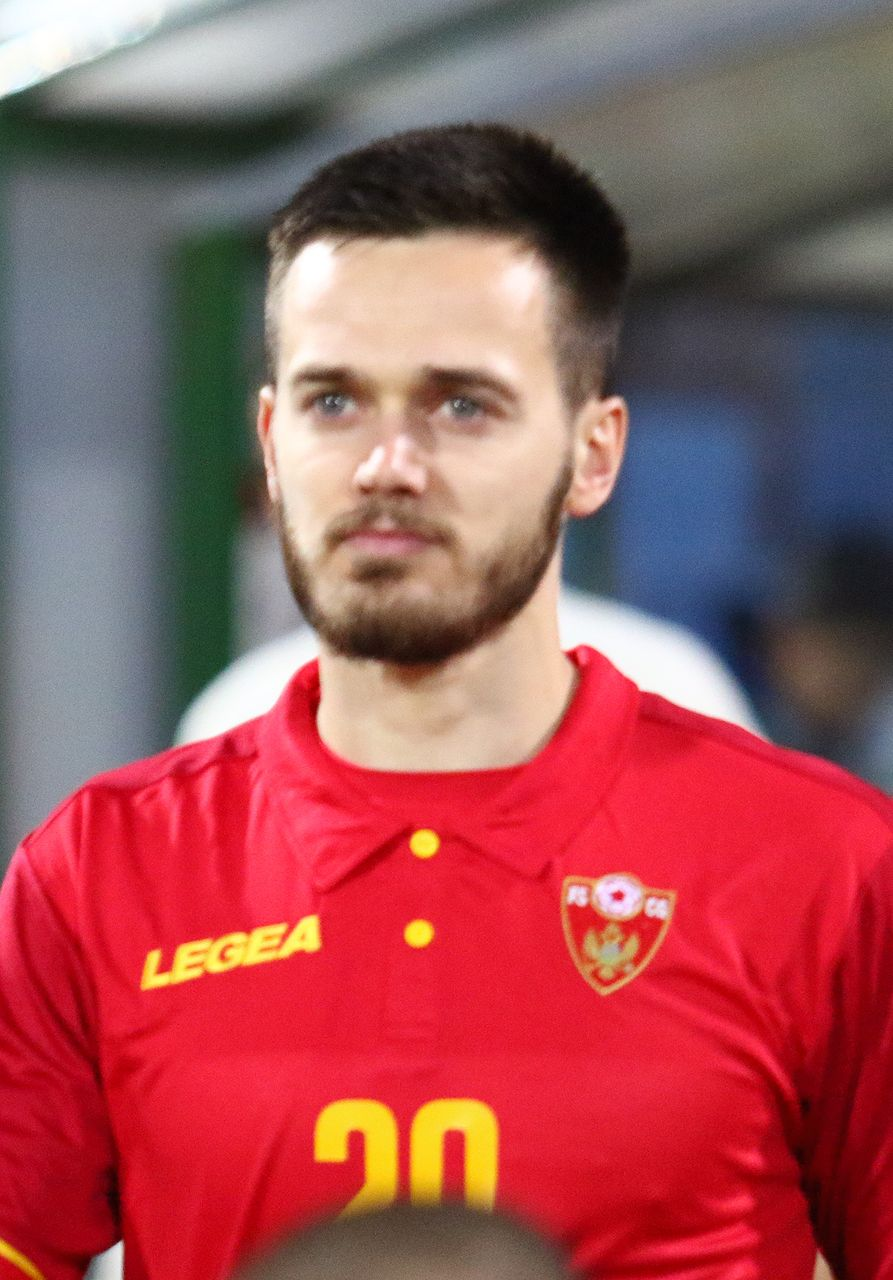
- Ivanić with Montenegro in 2019

Personal information
- Full name: Mirko Ivanić
- Date of birth: 13 September 1993 (age 33)
- Place of birth: Bački Jarak, FR Yugoslavia
- Height: 1.84 m (6 ft 1/2 in)
- Position: Attacking midfielder

Team information
- Current team: Red Star Belgrade
- Number: 4

Youth career
- Vojvodina

Senior career*
Years	Team	Apps	(Gls)
2012–2016	Vojvodina	56	(20)
2012–2013	→ Proleter Novi Sad (loan)	39	(11)
2016–2018	BATE Borisov	78	(17)
2019–	Red Star Belgrade	208	(75)

International career^{‡}
2015	Serbia U21	1	(0)
2017–2019	Montenegro	15	(1)
- * Club domestic league appearances and goals as of 21 November 2026 ‡ National team caps and goals as of 25 March 2019

Mirko Ivanić (Serbian Cyrillic: Мирко Иванић, pronounced [mǐːrko ǐʋanitɕ]; born 13 September 1993) is a professional footballer who plays as an attacking midfielder for Serbian club Red Star Belgrade. Born in Serbia, he played for the Montenegro national team.

== Club career ==
=== Vojvodina ===
Born in Bački Jarak, Ivanić came through the youth academy of Vojvodina, before being loaned to Proleter Novi Sad in order to get senior football experience. He made 24 appearances and scored five goals in the 2012–13 Serbian First League. In the summer of 2013, Ivanić returned to Vojvodina, appearing in a 2–0 home win over Budapest Honvéd in the first leg of the Europa League second qualifying round. He was sent on loan again to Proleter Novi Sad, before returning to Vojvodina in the 2014 winter transfer window. Upon his return to the club, Ivanić played regularly under manager Branko Babić, helping his team win the 2013–14 Serbian Cup.

In the 2014–15 season, Ivanić became one of the team's most influential players, making 26 league appearances and scoring 10 goals, one less than Mijat Gaćinović. During the final days of the summer 2015 transfer window, Partizan offered Vojvodina €1.5 million for Ivanić, but Ivanić rejected it, as he insisted on refusing offers from Vojvodina's rivals Partizan and Red Star Belgrade.

=== BATE Borisov ===
On 2 February 2016, Ivanić signed a contract with BATE Borisov.

On 26 November 2017, in the last game of the season BATE Borisov were 3-2 down against FC Gorodeya, Mirko scored the last minute equaliser against them to make it 3-3 which was enough to see them win the league on goal difference against league rivals Dinamo Minsk.

During his three-year stint in Borisov, Ivanić won the league three times, as well as featuring in the Europa League group stage two consecutive seasons.

=== Red Star Belgrade ===
On 8 February 2019, Red Star Belgrade officially announced the signing of Ivanić in a €1.3 million transfer. He chose the number 8 jersey, previously worn by former teammate at Vojvodina, Dejan Meleg, who was sent out on loan to Greek side Levadiakos. Before his transfer to BATE Borisov, Ivanić declined offers from both Red Star and Partizan, stating that "it wouldn't work as the captain of Vojvodina to move to Partizan or Red Star".

== International career ==
Ivanić made his debut for the Serbian national under-21 team in a friendly against Italy U21 on 30 March 2015. He was subsequently selected to represent his country at the 2015 UEFA European Under-21 Championship, but failed to make an appearance. On 14 March 2017, however, Ivanić received a call-up to the Montenegro national team in a 2018 FIFA World Cup qualifier against Poland on March 26, 2017. In the match against Poland, which Montenegro lost 1-2, Ivanić made his debut coming on the field as a substitute for Damir Kojašević in the 80th minute. On 27 March 2018 he scored his first goal in the national team in a 2–2 draw against Turkey. Despite being called up in June 2019, Ivanić (along with Filip Stojković and Serbian manager Ljubiša Tumbaković) refused to play for the national team against Kosovo. Tumbaković was sacked for his actions the next day. As of November 2025, Ivanić has not been called up since.

== Career statistics ==
=== Club ===
As of match played 21 November 2026

Club	Season	League			National cup (Note: Includes Serbian Cup, Belarusian Cup)		Continental		Total	
Club	Season	Division	Apps	Goals	Apps	Goals	Apps	Goals	Apps	Goals
Vojvodina	2013–14	Serbian SuperLiga	10	2	2	0	1 (Note: Appearances in UEFA Europa League)	0	13	2
Vojvodina	2014–15	Serbian SuperLiga	26	10	2	0	2	1	30	11
Vojvodina	2015–16	Serbian SuperLiga	20	8	2	0	8	2	30	10
Vojvodina	Total		56	20	6	0	11	3	73	23
Proleter Novi Sad (loan)	2012–13	Serbian First League	24	5	1	0	0	0	25	5
Proleter Novi Sad (loan)	2013–14	Serbian First League	15	6	1	0	0	0	16	6
Proleter Novi Sad (loan)	Total		39	11	2	0	0	0	41	11
BATE Borisov	2016	Belarusian Premier League	26	6	6	2	6 (Note: Four appearances in UEFA Champions League, two appearances in UEFA Europa League)	0	38	8
BATE Borisov	2017	Belarusian Premier League	27	4	6	3	12 (Note: Four appearances in UEFA Champions League, eight appearances and four goals in UEFA Europa League)	4	45	11
BATE Borisov	2018	Belarusian Premier League	25	7	7	5	11 (Note: Six appearances and one goal in UEFA Champions League, five appearances and one goal in UEFA Europa League)	2	43	14
BATE Borisov	Total		78	17	19	10	29	6	126	33
Red Star	2018–19	Serbian SuperLiga	14	1	4	2	0	0	18	3
Red Star	2019–20	Serbian SuperLiga	19	2	2	1	10 (Note: Appearances in UEFA Champions League)	0	31	3
Red Star	2020–21	Serbian SuperLiga	33	16	5	1	10 (Note: Three appearances in three goals in UEFA Champions League, seven appearances in UEFA Europa League)	3	48	20
Red Star	2021–22	Serbian SuperLiga	36	17	5	2	14 (Note: Four appearances and one goal in UEFA Champions League, ten appearances and four goals in UEFA Europa League)	5	55	24
Red Star	2022–23	Serbian SuperLiga	29	8	5	2	7 (Note: Three appearances and one goal in UEFA Champoions League, four appearances in UEFA Europa League)	1	41	11
Red Star	2023–24	Serbian SuperLiga	26	5	3	1	5	0	34	6
Red Star	2024–25	Serbian SuperLiga	21	11	3	1	7	1	31	13
Red Star	2025–26	Serbian SuperLiga	18	12	1	1	12	3	31	16
Red Star	2026–27	Serbian SuperLiga	12	3	1	1	6	3	19	7
Red Star	Total		208	75	29	12	71	16	308	103
Career total			381	123	56	22	111	25	548	170

=== International goals ===
Scores and results list Montenegro's goal tally first.

No	Date	Venue	Opponent	Score	Result	Competition
1.	27 March 2018	Podgorica City Stadium, Podgorica, Montenegro	Turkey	1–2	2–2	Friendly

== Honours ==
Vojvodina

- Serbian Cup: 2013–14

BATE Borisov

- Belarusian Premier League: 2016, 2017, 2018
- Belarusian Super Cup: 2017, 2018

Red Star Belgrade

- Serbian SuperLiga: 2018–19, 2019–20, 2020–21, 2021–22, 2022–23, 2023–24, 2024–25, 2025–26
- Serbian Cup: 2020–21, 2021–22, 2022–23, 2023–24, 2024–25, 2025–26

Individual

- Serbian SuperLiga Player of the Week: 2020–21 (Round 36), 2021–22 (Round 32), 2022–23 (Round 6), 2023–24 (Round 11)
- Serbian SuperLiga Team of the Season: 2023–24
