= Jay Enem =

Dutch footballer (born 2003)

Personal information
- Full name: Jay Ifeanyi-Junior Tyron Enem
- Date of birth: 11 March 2003 (age 23)
- Place of birth: Amsterdam, Netherlands
- Height: 1.95 m (6 ft 5 in)
- Position: Forward

Team information
- Current team: Bologna
- Number: 22

Youth career
- 2014–2015: AFC
- 2015–2016: AZ Alkmaar
- 2016–2022: Ajax
- 2022: Venezia

Senior career*
Years	Team	Apps	(Gls)
2022	Jong Ajax	2	(0)
2022–2025	Venezia	1	(0)
2023	→ Vis Pesaro (loan)	7	(0)
2023–2024	→ Ethnikos Achna (loan)	2	(0)
2024–2025	→ Omonia 29M (loan)	25	(3)
2025–2026	OFK Beograd	17	(10)
2026	→ Red Star Belgrade (loan)	11	(5)
2026	Red Star Belgrade	2	(1)
2026–	Bologna	3	(1)
- * Club domestic league appearances and goals as of 20:05, 17 October 2026 (UTC)

Jay Ifeanyi-Junior Tyron Enem (born 11 March 2003) is a Dutch professional footballer who plays as a forward for Serie A club Bologna.

== Club career ==
Enem spent his formative years at AFC, AZ Alkmaar and Ajax. Having come through the youth ranks at the latter club, he made his debut for Jong Ajax on 11 March 2022, coming on as a substitute in a 3–3 Eerste Divisie draw against FC Dordrecht. During the 2021–22 season, he also became the top scorer for Ajax's under-18 team. In the summer of 2022, the striker featured for Ajax's senior team in several pre-season friendly matches, scoring against NK Lokomotiva Zagreb.

On 18 August 2022, Enem joined Serie B club Venezia on a permanent deal, signing a two-year contract, with an option for another season; he was initially registered for the under-19 team. He made his first-team debut for Venezia on 21 January 2023, coming on as a substitute in the final minutes of a 0–1 league loss to Südtirol.

On 31 January of the same year, Enem joined Serie C side Vis Pesaro on loan until the end of the season. He was part of the team that managed to stay in the third tier without taking part in play-outs, following Imolese's point deduction and consequent relegation.

On 16 September 2023, Enem was sent on loan to Cypriot side Ethnikos Achna until the end of the season. On 10 September 2024, he moved on a new loan in Cyprus, this time with PAC Omonia 29M.

Enem later joined Serbian SuperLiga side OFK Beograd, before moving to Red Star Belgrade on loan, with the transfer later made permanent for €2 million. On 31 August 2026, Enem returned to Italy, joining Serie A club Bologna for a reported fee of €6 million.

== Personal life ==
Born in the Netherlands, Enem is of Nigerian descent.

== Career statistics ==
As of match played 17 October 2026

Appearances and goals by club, season and competition
Club	Season	League			Cup		Europe		Other		Total	
Club	Season	Division	Apps	Goals	Apps	Goals	Apps	Goals	Apps	Goals	Apps	Goals
Jong Ajax	2021–22	Eerste Divisie	2	0	—		—		—		2	0
Venezia	2022–23	Serie B	1	0	0	0	—		—		1	0
Vis Pesaro (loan)	2022–23	Serie C	7	0	—		—		—		7	0
Ethnikos Achna (loan)	2023–24	Cypriot First Division	2	0	0	0	—		—		2	0
Omonia 29M (loan)	2024–25	Cypriot First Division	25	3	1	1	—		—		26	4
OFK Beograd	2025–26	Serbian SuperLiga	17	10	—		—		—		17	10
Red Star Belgrade (loan)	2025–26	Serbian SuperLiga	11	5	3	1	2 (Note: Appearances in UEFA Europa League)	0	—		16	6
Red Star Belgrade	2026–27	Serbian SuperLiga	2	1	0	0	4 (Note: Two appearances in UEFA Champions League, two appearances in UEFA Europa League)	0	—		6	1
Bologna	2026–27	Serie A	3	1	0	0	—		—		3	1
Career total			70	20	4	2	6	1	0	0	80	22

== Honours ==
Red Star

- Serbian SuperLiga: 2025–26
- Serbian Cup: 2025–26
