= Emmanuel Boateng =

Emmanuel Boateng may refer to:

- Emmanuel Boateng (footballer, born 1994), Ghanaian footballer
- Emmanuel Boateng (footballer, born 1996), Ghanaian footballer
- Emmanuel Boateng (footballer, born 1997), Ghanaian footballer
