= Jovan Damjanović =

Serbian footballer

Personal information
- Full name: Jovan Damjanović
- Date of birth: 4 October 1982 (age 44)
- Place of birth: Knin, SR Croatia, SFR Yugoslavia
- Height: 1.93 m (6 ft 4 in)
- Position: Striker

Team information
- Current team: OFK Beograd (manager)

Youth career
- Red Star Belgrade

Senior career*
| Years | Team | Apps | (Gls) |
| 2000–2001 | Sutjeska Nikšić | 5 | (0) |
| 2001–2002 | Radnički Obrenovac | 15 | (1) |
| 2002–2003 | Rad | 34 | (4) |
| 2004 | Železnik | 14 | (1) |
| 2005–2006 | Borac Čačak | 37 | (14) |
| 2006–2007 | Ried | 36 | (9) |
| 2007–2009 | SC Paderborn 07 | 31 | (8) |
| 2009–2010 | Wehen Wiesbaden | 23 | (1) |
| 2011–2012 | Borac Čačak | 29 | (8) |
| 2012–2013 | Dinamo Minsk | 25 | (6) |
| 2013 | → Dinamo Brest (loan) | 4 | (0) |
| 2013 | OFK Beograd | 9 | (4) |
| 2014 | Hunan Billows | 17 | (8) |
| 2015 | Novi Pazar | 11 | (0) |
| 2016 | Voždovac | 9 | (1) |
| Total | | 299 | (65) |

International career
| 1998 | FR Yugoslavia U16 | 3 | (0) |
| 2000–2001 | FR Yugoslavia U18 | 8 | (5) |
| 2011 | Serbia | 3 | (0) |

Managerial career
- 2018: Voždovac
- 2020–2021: Voždovac
- 2021–2023: Serbia U18
- 2023–2024: Serbia U17
- 2024–2025: TSC
- 2026–: OFK Beograd
- * Club domestic league appearances and goals

Jovan Damjanović (Serbian Cyrillic: Јован Дамјановић; born 4 October 1982) is a Serbian retired footballer who played as a striker. He is currently the head coach of OFK Beograd.

== International career ==
In 2011, Damjanović was capped three times for Serbia. He previously represented FR Yugoslavia at the 2001 UEFA European Under-18 Championship, scoring three goals in the process, as the team lost in the third-place match.

== Personal life ==
Jovan is father of the serbian football player Aleksa Damjanović.

== Managerial statistics ==
As of match played 14 September 202

Managerial record by team and tenure
| Team | From | To | Record | | | | | Ref |
| Team | From | To | G | W | D | L | Win % | Ref |
|---|---|---|---|---|---|---|---|---|
| FK Voždovac | 24 September 2018 | 13 October 2018 | 3 | 1 | 0 | 2 | 33.33 | |
| FK Voždovac | 12 March 2020 | 12 April 2021 | 40 | 16 | 9 | 15 | 40.00 | |
| Serbia U18 | 1 September 2021 | 30 June 2023 | 10 | 6 | 1 | 3 | 60.00 | |
| Serbia U17 | 25 April 2023 | 25 August 2024 | 23 | 16 | 1 | 6 | 69.57 | |
| TSC | 30 August 2024 | 29 February 2025 | 29 | 10 | 5 | 14 | 34.48 | |
| OFK Beograd | 3 January 2026 | 14 September 2026 | 25 | 6 | 11 | 8 | 24.00 | |
| Total | | | 129 | 54 | 27 | 48 | 41.86 | |
