= Stefan Tomović =

Serbian football player

Personal information
- Date of birth: 14 October 2001 (age 25)
- Place of birth: Kruševac, FR Yugoslavia
- Height: 1.84 m (6 ft 0 in)
- Position: Attacking midfielder

Team information
- Current team: Ningbo FC
- Number: 45

Youth career
- –2019: Trayal Kruševac
- 2020: Brodarac

Senior career*
Years	Team	Apps	(Gls)
2021–2022	Proleter Novi Sad	44	(11)
2022–2024	Čukarički	30	(5)
2024–2026	Spartak Subotica	81	(17)
2026–	Ningbo FC	0	(0)
- * Club domestic league appearances and goals as of 13 June 2026

Stefan Tomović (Serbian Cyrillic: Стефан Томовић; born 14 October 2001) is a Serbian professional footballer who plays as an attacking midfielder for Ningbo FC.

On 4 July 2026, Tomović joined China League One side Ningbo FC.

== Honours ==
Individual

- Serbian SuperLiga Player of the Week: 2025–26 (Round 1)
