= 2025–26 Serbian SuperLiga =

Serbian SuperLiga
- Season: 2025–26
- Dates: 19 July 2025 – 24 May 2026
- Teams: 16
- Champions: Red Star Belgrade (12th title)
- Promoted: Radnik; Javor-Matis
- Relegated: Napredak; Javor-Matis; Spartak ŽK; TSC
- Champions League: Red Star Belgrade
- Europa League: Vojvodina
- Conference League: Partizan; Železničar
- Matches: 215
- Goals: 211 (0.98 per match)
- Best player: Aleksandar Katai
- Top goalscorer: Aleksandar Katai (24 goals)
- Best goalkeeper: Balša Popović
- Total attendance: 666.578
- Average attendance: 2.357
- All statistics correct as of 24 May 2026.

The 2025–26 Serbian SuperLiga is the 20th season of the Serbian SuperLiga, the top flight of football in Serbia. The season kicked off on 19 July 2025. The title holder is Red Star Belgrade. The tournament features two promoted clubs, Radnik and Javor-Matis.

The draw was held on 13 June 2025.

== Overview ==
Serbian SuperLiga will be reduced from 16 to 14 teams from 2026–27. Thus for this season, four teams will automatically be relegated to next season's Serbian First League.

== Teams ==
Locations of the 2025-26 Serbian SuperLiga teams
Locations of the 2025-26 Serbian SuperLiga teams from Belgrade

Sixteen teams compete in the league, the top 14 from previous season and two teams promoted from Serbian First League. Promoted teams are Radnik and Javor-Matis who are making an immediate return to top tier Serbian SuperLiga after a one-year absence; they are replacing Tekstilac and Jedinstvo who were relegated after one year in top tier.

=== Team changes ===
Promoted from 2024–25 Serbian First League	Relegated from 2024–25 Serbian SuperLiga
▲ Radnik ▲ Javor-Matis	▼ Tekstilac ▼ Jedinstvo

=== Stadium and locations ===
Club	City	Stadium	Capacity
Red Star Belgrade	Belgrade	Rajko Mitić Stadium	51,755
Čukarički	Belgrade	Čukarički Stadium	4,070
IMT	New Belgrade	Lagator Stadium	8,030
Javor-Matis	Ivanjica	Stadion kraj Moravice	5,000
Mladost	Lučani	SRC Mr Radoš Milovanović	6,000
Napredak	Kruševac	Mladost Stadium	10,331
Novi Pazar	Novi Pazar	Novi Pazar City Stadium	10,000
OFK Beograd	Belgrade	Omladinski Stadium	10,600
Partizan	Belgrade	Partizan Stadium	29,775
Radnički 1923	Kragujevac	Čika Dača Stadium	15,100
Radnički Niš	Niš	Čair Stadium	18,151
Radnik	Surdulica	Surdulica City Stadium	3,312
Spartak ŽK	Subotica	Subotica City Stadium	13,000
TSC	Bačka Topola	TSC Arena	4,500
Vojvodina	Novi Sad	Karađorđe Stadium	14,458
Železničar	Pančevo	SC Mladost Stadium	2,967

=== Number of teams by cities ===
No. of teams	Cities	Team(s)
5	Belgrade	Čukarički, IMT, OFK Beograd, Partizan, Red Star Belgrade
1
1	Ivanjica	Javor-Matis
1	Lučani	Mladost
1	Kruševac	Napredak
1	Novi Pazar	Novi Pazar
1	Kragujevac	Radnički 1923
1	Niš	Radnički Niš
1	Surdulica	Radnik
1	Subotica	Spartak ŽK
1	Bačka Topola	TSC
1	Novi Sad	Vojvodina
1	Pančevo	Železničar

=== Personnel and kits ===
Note: Flags indicate national team as has been defined under FIFA eligibility rules. Players and Managers may hold more than one non-FIFA nationality.

Team	Manager	Captain	Kit maker	Shirt sponsor(s)
Čukarički	(Serbia) Marko Jakšić	(Serbia) Marko Docić	Adidas	
IMT	(Serbia) Zoran Vasiljević	(Serbia) Nikola Krstić	SevenSports	Meridianbet
Javor-Matis	(Serbia) Radovan Ćurčić	(Serbia) Stefan Milošević	Joma	Matis Nameštaj
Mladost	(Serbia) Nenad Mijailović	(Serbia) Nikola Ćirković	Kelme	MB Lučani
Napredak	(Serbia) Saša Mićović	(Serbia) Nebojša Bastajić	Givova	mt:s
Novi Pazar	(Serbia) Nenad Lalatović	(Serbia) Nemanja Miletić	Macron	Doha Group
OFK Beograd	(Serbia) Jovan Damjanović	(Serbia) Saša Marković	Macron	Mozzart Bet
Partizan	(Serbia) Srđan Blagojević	(Israel) Bibras Natcho	Kappa	MaxBet
Radnički 1923	(Serbia) Slavko Matić	(Serbia) Milan Mitrović	SevenSports	AdmiralBet, Sportske.net
Radnički Niš	(Serbia) Marko Neđić	(Serbia) Radomir Milosavljević	Masita	mt:s, MaxBet
Radnik	(Serbia) Dušan Đorđević	(Serbia) Mateja Gašić	Jako	New City Hotel & Restaurant
Red Star Belgrade	(Serbia) Dejan Stanković	(Montenegro) Mirko Ivanić	Macron	Gazprom
Spartak ŽK	(Montenegro) Savo Pavićević	(Serbia) Luka Subotić	Legea	Ždrepčeva Krv, AdmiralBet
TSC	(Serbia) Tomislav Sivić	(Serbia) Nikola Simić	Capelli Sport	MU EA, ST Cable
Vojvodina	(Serbia) Miroslav Tanjga	(Serbia) Slobodan Medojević	Joma	MaxBet, Srbijagas
Železničar	(Serbia) Radomir Koković	(Serbia) Zoran Popović	Capelli Sport	AdmiralBet

Notes

- Nike is the official ball supplier for Serbian SuperLiga.
- Capelli Sport is the official sponsor of the Referee's Committee of the Football Association of Serbia.

=== Managerial changes ===
Team	Outgoing manager	Manner of departure	Position in the table	Date of vacancy	Incoming manager	Date of appointment
Mladost	(Serbia) Nikola Trajković	Sacked	Pre-season	26 May 2025	(Serbia) Mladen Dodić	14 June 2025
Radnički Niš	(Cyprus) Siniša Dobrašinović	Sacked	Pre-season	9 June 2025	(Serbia) Slavko Matić	9 June 2025
Napredak	(Serbia) Zoran Ristić	End of caretaker spell	Pre-season	12 June 2025	(Serbia) Milan Nikolić	12 June 2025
Spartak ŽK	(Serbia) Tomislav Sivić	Mutual consent	Pre-season	16 June 2025	(Serbia) Dušan Đorđević	17 June 2025
TSC	(Serbia) Slavko Matić	Sacked	Pre-season	5 June 2025	(Netherlands) Darije Kalezić	19 June 2025
IMT	(Serbia) Zoran Vasiljević	Resigned	12th	28 July 2025	(Serbia) Bojan Krulj	30 July 2025
Radnički 1923	(Bosnia and Herzegovina) Feđa Dudić	Resigned	9th	2 August 2025	(Serbia) Nikola Pavlović (caretaker)	3 August 2025
Radnički 1923	(Serbia) Nikola Pavlović (caretaker)	End of caretaker spell	14th	8 August 2025	(Serbia) Aleksandar Luković	8 August 2025
Radnički Niš	(Serbia) Slavko Matić	Sacked	8th	12 August 2025	(Serbia) Tomislav Sivić	12 August 2025
Mladost	(Serbia) Mladen Dodić	Sacked	9th	15 August 2025	(Serbia) Vujadin Radenković (caretaker)	24 August 2025
Mladost	(Serbia) Vujadin Radenković (caretaker)	End of caretaker spell	10th	26 August 2025	(Serbia) Nenad Lalatović	26 August 2025
Napredak	(Serbia) Milan Nikolić	Resigned	15th	20 September 2025	(Montenegro) Radoslav Batak	23 September 2025
Spartak ŽK	(Serbia) Dušan Đorđević	Mutual consent	16th	20 September 2025	(Serbia) Đorđe Tutorić	28 September 2025
Radnički 1923	(Serbia) Aleksandar Luković	Resignation	11th	20 October 2025	(Bosnia and Herzegovina) Mladen Žižović	23 October 2025
Radnički 1923	(Bosnia and Herzegovina) Mladen Žižović	Deceased	10th	3 November 2025	(Bosnia and Herzegovina) Bojan Puzigaća	10 November 2025
Partizan	(Serbia) Srđan Blagojević	Fired	2th	1 November 2025	(Serbia) Marko Jovanović (caretaker)	2 November 2025
TSC	(Netherlands) Darije Kalezić	Fired	13th	4 November 2025	(Serbia) Nemanja Miljanović (caretaker)	5 November 2025
Partizan	(Serbia) Marko Jovanović (caretaker)	Fired	1th	13 November 2025	(Serbia) Nenad Stojakovic	14 November 2025
Radnički Niš	(Serbia) Tomislav Sivić	Sacked	14th	4 December 2025	(Greece) Takis Lemonis	12 December 2025
Red Star Belgrade	(Serbia) Vladan Milojević	Sacked	Mutual consent	20 December 2025	(Serbia) Dejan Stanković	20 December 2025
OFK Beograd	(Bosnia and Herzegovina) Simo Krunić	Mutual consent	10th	1 January 2026	(Serbia) Jovan Damjanović	3 January 2026
Radnički 1923	(Bosnia and Herzegovina) Bojan Puzigaća	Mutual consent	9th	1 January 2026	(Montenegro) Božidar Bandović	3 January 2026
Napredak	(Montenegro) Radoslav Batak	Mutual consent	16th	1 January 2026	(Montenegro) Nikola Drinčić	3 January 2026

== Regular season ==
=== League table ===
Pos	Team	Pld	W	D	L	GF	GA	GD	Pts	Qualification
1	Red Star Belgrade	30	24	3	3	87	23	+64	75	Qualification for the Championship round
2	Vojvodina	30	19	5	6	55	29	+26	62	Qualification for the Championship round
3	Partizan	30	19	4	7	62	39	+23	61	Qualification for the Championship round
4	Železničar	30	15	6	9	42	30	+12	51	Qualification for the Championship round
5	Novi Pazar	30	13	8	9	38	37	+1	47	Qualification for the Championship round
6	OFK Beograd	30	10	10	10	39	39	0	40 (Note: Head to head points: OFK Beograd 6, Čukarički 0.)	Qualification for the Championship round
7	Čukarički	30	10	10	10	42	43	−1	40	Qualification for the Championship round
8	Radnik	30	10	9	11	37	35	+2	39	Qualification for the Championship round
9	IMT	30	10	7	13	35	49	−14	37	Qualification for the Relegation round
10	Radnički 1923	30	8	12	10	32	37	−5	36	Qualification for the Relegation round
11	Javor-Matis	30	8	10	12	29	39	−10	34 (Note: Head to head away goals: Javor 2, TSC 0.)	Qualification for the Relegation round
12	TSC	30	8	10	12	26	35	−9	34	Qualification for the Relegation round
13	Radnički Niš	30	9	6	15	36	42	−6	33	Qualification for the Relegation round
14	Mladost	30	7	11	12	23	46	−23	32	Qualification for the Relegation round
15	Spartak Subotica	30	4	9	17	34	55	−21	21	Qualification for the Relegation round
16	Napredak	30	2	8	20	26	65	−39	14	Qualification for the Relegation round

Source: Superliga
Rules for classification: 1) Points; 2) Head-to-head points; 3) Head-to-head goal difference; 4) Head-to-head goals scored; 5) Head-to-head away goals scored (if two teams tied); 6) Goal difference; 7) Goals scored; 8) Fair play ranking; 9) Draw.

=== Results ===
Home \ Away	ČUK	IMT	JAV	MLA	NAP	NPZ	OFK	PAR	RAD	RDK	RNI	RSB	SPA	TSC	VOJ	ŽEL
Čukarički		1–1	1–0	3–1	1–0	1–1	1–3	4–1	1–1	0–0	1–1	1–3	2–1	4–2	2–3	3–2
IMT	1–3		1–0	1–3	2–0	2–3	1–1	1–0	0–0	2–0	1–0	1–2	1–0	1–1	0–0	1–4
Javor-Matis	1–0	2–0		0–0	0–0	0–0	0–1	2–3	3–2	2–2	2–1	1–0	1–1	0–0	1–2	1–2
Mladost	1–1	1–1	2–1		2–0	0–2	0–0	1–1	1–0	0–2 (Note: The original match was abandoned in the 41st minute after the collapse of Radnički 1923 manager Mladen Žižović during the match.)	2–1	1–4	0–0	1–3	0–0	2–1
Napredak	1–1	3–1	1–2	0–1		2–2	2–2	2–7	1–3	0–1	2–4	0–3	1–1	1–2	1–4	2–1
Novi Pazar	1–1	1–2	1–2	1–0	2–1		2–1	2–3	2–0	1–1	1–0	1–5	2–2	2–0	1–0	1–0
OFK Beograd	2–0	3–3	1–0	1–1	4–0	0–2		0–2	0–0	0–0	0–1	3–4	1–3	0–1	1–2	0–0
Partizan	0–0	5–1	4–0	3–0	3–2	2–0	1–2		2–0	2–1	0–0	1–2	2–1	2–1	1–0	1–3
Radnik	3–1	2–0	1–1	0–0	2–1	1–0	1–0	2–3		2–3	2–2	1–2	2–0	0–0	3–1	1–2
Radnički 1923	3–2	3–1	1–1	1–1	0–0	0–0	0–2	2–4	0–0		1–0	0–2	2–0	2–1	0–1	1–1
Radnički Niš	1–2	2–1	1–0	3–1	3–0	2–3	1–2	2–2	4–2	2–1		0–0	0–2	1–1	0–1	1–0
Red Star Belgrade	3–0	6–1	4–0	4–0	4–0	5–0	7–1	3–0	1–1	2–1	2–0		3–2	1–0	0–1	7–1
Spartak ŽK	1–3	0–1	1–2	1–1	2–1	1–1	2–2	2–5	1–3	3–3	2–0	2–3		1–2	1–3	0–3
TSC	1–1	1–3	2–2	1–0	1–1	1–0	1–3	0–1	0–2	0–0	2–1	0–0	2–0		0–2	0–0
Vojvodina	3–1	1–3	2–2	5–0	4–1	0–3	0–0	3–0	2–0	4–1	3–2	3–2	2–0	2–0		1–1
Železničar	1–0	1–0	2–0	5–0	0–0	2–0	1–3	0–1	1–0	1–0	3–0	0–3	1–1	1–0	2–0	

Source: SuperLiga (in Serbian)
Legend: Blue = home team win; Yellow = draw; Red = away team win.
For upcoming matches, an "a" indicates there is an article about the rivalry between the two participants.

== Play-offs ==
=== Championship round ===
The top eight teams advance from the regular season. Teams played each other once.

==== League table ====
Pos	Team	Pld	W	D	L	GF	GA	GD	Pts	Qualification	RSB	VOJ	PAR	ZEL	NPZ	OFK	RAD	CUK
1	Red Star Belgrade (C)	37	27	5	5	100	31	+69	86	Qualification for the Champions League second qualifying round		4–1	3–0		1–2	1–2		
2	Vojvodina	37	23	7	7	66	35	+31	76	Qualification for the Europa League first qualifying round (Note: The winner of the 2025–26 Serbian Cup (Red Star Belgrade) qualifies for the Europa League first qualifying round. Since the champions won the cup, the second place team takes the Europa League berth and the fourth place team gets a Conference League berth.)			0–0	0–0	3–0			1–0
3	Partizan	37	22	7	8	72	45	+27	73	Qualification for the Conference League second qualifying round				2–1	2–1	1–1	5–0	
4	Železničar	37	16	11	10	50	37	+13	59	Qualification for the Conference League second qualifying round	2–2					2–0	1–1	0–0
5	Novi Pazar	37	14	10	13	46	54	−8	52					2–2		1–5		2–2
6	OFK Beograd	37	12	13	12	49	47	+2	49			1–2					1–1	0–0
7	Radnik	37	11	13	13	44	48	−4	46		0–0	1–4			2–0			
8	Čukarički	37	10	15	12	47	50	−3	45		1–2		0–0				2–2	

Updated to match(es) played on 23 May 2026. Source: (in Serbian)
Legend: Blue = home team win; Yellow = draw; Red = away team win.
Rules for classification: 1) Points; 2) Points in regular season; 3) Head-to-head points in regular season; 4) Head-to-head goal difference in regular season; 5) Head-to-head goals scored in regular season; 6) Head-to-head away goals scored in regular season (if two teams tied); 7) Goal difference; 8) Goals scored; 9) Fair play ranking; 10) Drawing of lots.
(C) Champions

=== Relegation round ===
The bottom eight teams advance from the regular season. Teams played each other once.

==== League table ====
Pos	Team	Pld	W	D	L	GF	GA	GD	Pts	Qualification or relegation	IMT	RNI	MLA	RDK	TSC	JAV	SPA	NAP
1	IMT	37	13	11	13	41	51	−10	50			2–0	1–1	0–0	1–1			
2	Radnički Niš	37	14	7	16	46	49	−3	49				1–0			3–2	2–1	
3	Mladost	37	11	13	13	33	52	−19	46					0–0			2–1	1–0
4	Radnički 1923	37	9	18	10	41	42	−1	45			1–1			2–2	2–2	4–0	
5	TSC (R)	37	11	12	14	45	45	0	45	Relegation to Serbian First League		1–2	1–2			6–1		4–1
6	Javor-Matis (R)	37	10	12	15	41	54	−13	42	Relegation to Serbian First League	0–0		2–4				1–0	4–0
7	Spartak Subotica (R)	37	4	9	24	37	72	−35	21	Relegation to Serbian First League	0–1				1–4			0–3
8	Napredak (R)	37	3	9	25	30	76	−46	18	Relegation to Serbian First League	0–1	0–1		0–0				

Updated to match(es) played on 24 May 2026. Source: (in Serbian)
Legend: Blue = home team win; Yellow = draw; Red = away team win.
Rules for classification: 1) Points; 2) Points in regular season; 3) Head-to-head points in regular season; 4) Head-to-head goal difference in regular season; 5) Head-to-head goals scored in regular season; 6) Head-to-head away goals scored in regular season (if two teams tied); 7) Goal difference; 8) Goals scored; 9) Fair play ranking; 10) Drawing of lots.
(R) Relegated

== Top scorers ==
As of matches played on 24 May 2026.

Rank	Player	Club	Goals
1	(Serbia) Aleksandar Katai	Red Star Belgrade	24
2	(Netherlands) Jay Enem	Red Star Belgrade	15
2	(Slovenia) Ester Sokler	Radnicki 1923	15
3	(Montenegro) Mirko Ivanić	Red Star Belgrade	12
3	(Serbia) Vasilije Kostov	Red Star Belgrade	12

=== Player of the week ===
As of matches played on 24 May 2026.

Round	Player	Club	Goals	Assist	Saves	Ref.
1	(Serbia) Stefan Tomović	Spartak Subotica	2	0	0	
2	(Serbia) Nemanja Đeković	Napredak	2	0	0	
3	(Serbia) Vladimir Stojković	Radnički 1923	0	0	10	
4	(Serbia) Bogdan Kostić	Partizan	2	0	0	
5	(Serbia) Aleksandar Katai	Red Star Belgrade	3	0	0	
6	(Serbia) Strahinja Manojlović	Radnički Niš	0	0	8	
7	(Serbia) Aleksandar Katai ^{(2)}	Red Star Belgrade ^{(2)}	2	0	0	
8	(Serbia) Aleksandar Katai ^{(3)}	Red Star Belgrade ^{(3)}	3	0	0	
9	(Serbia) Slobodan Tedić	Čukarički	2	1	0	
10	(Serbia) Saša Stamenković	Mladost	0	0	10	
11	(Brazil) Diogo Bezerra	OFK Beograd	1	1	0	
12	(Montenegro) Mirko Ivanić	Red Star Belgrade ^{(4)}	3	0	0	
13	(Serbia) Lazar Ranđelović	Vojvodina	1	2	0	
14	(Montenegro) Bojica Nikčević	Čukarički ^{(2)}	1	0	0	
15	(Serbia) Vasilije Kostov	Red Star Belgrade ^{(5)}	1	0	0	
16	(Serbia) Dario Grgić	Železničar	1	1	0	
17	(Serbia) Ognjen Ugrešić	Partizan ^{(2)}	2	0	0	
18	(Serbia) Jovan Milošević	Partizan ^{(3)}	2	0	0	
19	(Serbia) Nemanja Trifunović	Partizan ^{(4)}	1	0	0	
20	(Serbia) Andrej Milanović	IMT	1	0	0	
21	(Tunisia) Wajdi Sahli	Radnički 1923 ^{(2)}	2	0	0	
22	(Senegal) Demba Seck	Partizan ^{(5)}	2	0	0	
23	(England) Gboly Ariyibi	Radnički Niš ^{(2)}	1	2	0	
24	(Serbia) Vasilije Kostov ^{(2)}	Red Star Belgrade ^{(6)}	1	1	0	
25	(Serbia) Milan Rodić	OFK Beograd ^{(2)}	2	0	0	
26	(Serbia) Marko Veličković	Vojvodina ^{(2)}	1	0	0	
27	(Ghana) Kwaku Karikari	Železničar ^{(2)}	2	0	0	
28	(France) Charly Keïta	IMT ^{(2)}	2	1	0	
29	(Bulgaria) Sylvester Jasper	Železničar ^{(3)}	1	1	0	
30	(Serbia) Aleksandar Katai ^{(4)}	Red Star Belgrade ^{(7)}	2	0	0	
31	(Serbia) Aleksa Cvetković	OFK Beograd ^{(3)}	1	0	0	
32	(Austria) Andrej Todoroski	TSC	2	0	0	
33	(Serbia) Adem Avdić	Red Star Belgrade ^{(8)}	1	0	0	
34	(Serbia) Milan Kolarević	Vojvodina ^{(3)}	2	0	0	
35	(Serbia) Dragoljub Savić	TSC ^{(2)}	2	1	0	
36	(Serbia) Aleksandar Varjačić	Mladost ^{(2)}	0	2	0	
37	(Ivory Coast) Yacouba Silué	OFK Beograd ^{(4)}	1	1	0	

== Attendances ==
Serbian SuperLiga clubs listed by average home league attendance:

Pos	Club	Average attendance
1	Crvena zvezda	10,505
2	Partizan	4,693
3	Vojvodina	3,046
4	Novi Pazar	2,506
5	Radnički 1923	2,128
6	Radnički Niš	1,362
7	TSC	1,274
8	Železničar Pančevo	1,032
9	Napredak	850
10	OFK	842
11	Radnik	719
12	Spartak Subotica	696
13	Javor	689
14	Čukarički	625
15	IMT	555
16	Mladost Lučani	535

== See also ==
- 2025–26 Serbian First League
- 2025–26 Serbian Cup
