= 2025–26 Serbian Cup =

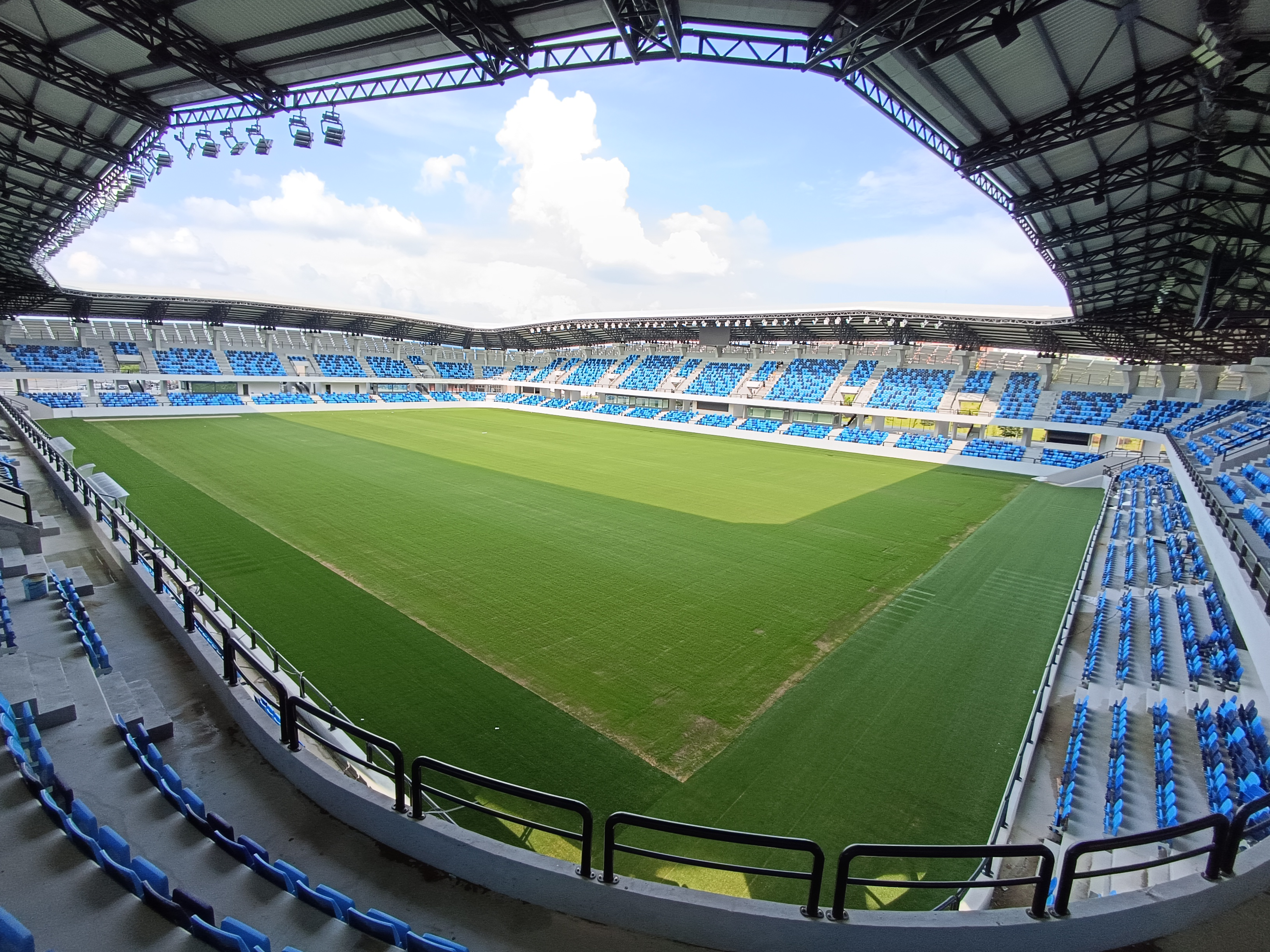
- Lagator Stadium hosted the final

Tournament details
- Country: Serbia
- Teams: 36

Final positions
- Champions: Red Star Belgrade (9 title)
- Runners-up: Vojvodina
- Semifinalists: Grafičar; Jedinstvo Ub

Tournament statistics
- Matches played: 20
- Goals scored: 55 (2.75 per match)
- Top goal scorer: (Ghana) Richardson Kwaku Denzell (5 goals)

The 2025–26 Serbian Cup in sponsorship reason Mozzart bet Kup Srbije was the nineteenth season of the Serbian national football cup competition. It started on 10 September 2025, and ended on 13 May 2026.

== Calendar ==
Round	Date(s)	Number of fixtures	Clubs	New entries this round
Preliminary round	10 September 2025	4	36 → 32	8
Round of 32	29 October 2025	16	32 → 16	28
Round of 16	2 December 2025	8	16 → 8	none
Quarter-finals	4 March 2026	4	8 → 4	none
Semi-finals	29 April 2026	2	4 → 2	none
Final	13 May 2026	1	2 → 1	none

== Preliminary round ==
A preliminary round was held in order to reduce the number of teams competing in the first round to 32. It consisted of 4 single-legged ties, with a penalty shoot-out as the decider if the score was tied after 90 minutes.

10 September 2025	Korićani (V)	1–1 (4–5 (Note: The players who took the penalties are listed in order from the lowest to the highest jersey number.) p)	Sloboda Užice (III)	Kragujevac
15:30	Jevtović 56'	Report	Draškić 35'	Stadium: Stadion FK Korićani; Attendance: 200; Referee: Strahinja Jovanović
	Penalties
	Rašić (penalty missed); Lepović (penalty scored); Stefanović (penalty scored); Jurišević (penalty scored); Mahmutović (penalty scored)		(penalty scored) Stevanović; (penalty scored) Bronja; (penalty scored) Kolašinac; (penalty scored) Glišović; (penalty scored) Miloradović

10 September 2025	Jedinstvo 1936 (III)	2–5	Sloven (III)	Kruševac
15:30	Baždarević 9'; Radivojević 67'	Report	Madžarević 18'; Aleksić 39'; Perošević 69'; Bašanović 75'; Maksimović 84' (pen.)	Stadium: Sportski centar Jedinstvo 1936; Attendance: 50; Referee: Mitar Klikovac

10 September 2025	Naftagas (III)	2–1	Smederevo 1924 (II)	Elemir
15:30	Silađi 7', 26'	Report	Lokosa 84'	Stadium: Stadion FK Naftagas; Attendance: 300; Referee: Nikola Čekičević

10 September 2025	Budućnost Dobanovci (III)	2–2 (4–2 p)	Inđija (III)	Dobanovci
15:30	Daničić 61'; Stoisavljević 90+5'	Report	Matić 65'; Radovanović 87'	Stadium: Stadion FK Budućnost; Referee: Nikola Božović
	Penalties
	Lučić (penalty scored); Đ. Dobrijević (penalty scored); Subotić (penalty scored); Daničić (penalty scored)		(penalty missed) L. Dobrijević; (penalty scored) M. Dobrijević; (penalty scored) Dimitrov; (penalty missed) Radovanović

== Round of 32 ==
Draw for the first round took place on 16 October 2025. Matches were played on 29 October 2025. It consisted of 16 single-legged ties, with a penalty shoot-out as the decider if the score was tied after 90 minutes.

Also, there's drawn a pair between Mladosti GAT and Vojvodina. However, the host withdrew from the competition, and Vojvodina secured a direct place in the round of 16.

28 October 2025	Javor Matis	2–4	Železničar Pančevo	Ivanjica
13:30	Pantelić 32', 37' (pen.)	Report	Cvetković 10'; Jevremović 45+2', 85'; Jovanović 55'	Stadium: Gradski stadion Attendance: 200; Referee: Predrag Simić

28 October 2025	Mačva Šabac (II)	2–0	Partizan	Šabac
18:30	Ergelaš 16'; Nikolić 65'	Report		Stadium: Stadion FK Mačva; Attendance: 4,000; Referee: Marko Delibašić

29 October 2025	RFK Grafičar (II)	2–0	TSC	Belgrade
13:00	Damjanović 11'; Jevremović 58'	Report		Stadium: Stadion Rajko Mitić - Pomoćni teren Attendance: 200; Referee: Miroslav Miletić

29 October 2025	Zemun (II)	2–1	Radnički 1923	Zemun
13:00	Kalat 65'; Trajkovski 83'	Report	Bevis 11'	Stadium: Zemun Stadium; Referee: David Matić

29 October 2025	Naftagas (III)	0–1	Novi Pazar	Elemir
13:00		Report	Malekinušić 21'	Stadium: Stadion FK Naftagas; Attendance: 500; Referee: Miroslav Milenković

29 October 2025	Mokra Gora (IV)	0–2	Spartak Subotica	Raška
13:00		Report	Abdul 62'; Mehmedović 90+1' (pen.)	Stadium: Gradski stadion Attendance: 400; Referee: Mladen Jakovljević

29 October 2025	Budućnost Dobanovci (III)	1–1 (5–4 p)	OFK Beograd	Dobanovci
13:00	Stoisavljević 25'	Report	Marković 35'	Stadium: Stadion FK Budućnost; Attendance: 200; Referee: Marko Gnjatović
	Penalties
	Savić (penalty scored); Lučić (penalty scored); Subotić (penalty scored); Daničić (penalty scored); Stoisavljević (penalty scored)		(penalty missed) Marković; (penalty scored) Šćepović; (penalty scored) Pantović; (penalty scored) Vukičević; (penalty scored) Bezzera

29 October 2025	Borac 1926 (II)	2–2 (4–1 p)	Čukarički	Čačak
13:00	Milekić 66'; Kojić 75'	Report	Vadze 2'; Miladinović 90+7'	Stadium: Čačak Stadium; Attendance: 300; Referee: Stefan Đokić
	Penalties
	Todosijević (penalty scored); Kojić (penalty scored); Marković (penalty scored); Čolić (penalty scored)		(penalty missed) Docić; (penalty scored) Tošić; (penalty missed) Pavkov

29 October 2025	Trayal (II)	3–0	Napredak Kruševac	Kruševac
15:30	Muydinov 11', 76'; Ivić 45'	Report		Stadium: Mladost Stadium; Attendance: 700; Referee: Stanko Ostraćanin

29 October 2025	Radnik Surdulica	0–1	IMT	Surdulica
16:00		Report	Batis 81'	Stadium: Surdulica City Stadium; Attendance: 200; Referee: Aleksandar Živković

30 October 2025	OFK Vršac (II)	0–0 (4–3 p)	Tekstilac Odžaci (II)	Vršac
13:00		Report		Stadium: Gradski stadion Attendance: 200; Referee: Jovan Šegrt
	Penalties
	Lainović (penalty scored); Kostadinov (penalty scored); Spasojević (penalty scored); Gojkov (penalty scored)		(penalty missed) Pantić; (penalty scored) Radulović; (penalty scored) Matejić; (penalty scored) Popović; (penalty missed) Mojsilović

30 October 2025	Dubočica (II)	1–1 (4–2 p)	Mladost Lučani	Leskovac
13:00	Aboosah 9'	Report	Alempijević 65'	Stadium: Dubočica Stadium; Attendance: 100; Referee: Aleksandar Vukadinović
	Penalties
	Eskić (penalty missed); Milunović (penalty scored); Halabrin (penalty scored); Luković (penalty scored); Pavlov (penalty scored)		(penalty scored) Joksimović; (penalty missed) Varjačić; (penalty missed) Sremčević; (penalty scored) Milojević

30 October 2025	Sloboda Užice (III)	1–2	Radnički Niš	Užice
15:30	Petrović 57'	Report	Belaković 17' (pen.); Kone 56'	Stadium: Radomir Antić Stadium; Referee: Nikola Petrović

30 October 2025	Voždovac (II)	2–4	Jedinstvo Ub (II)	Voždovac
18:00	Matić 57', 60'	Report	Hord 9', 14'; Denzell 23', 62'	Stadium: Voždovac Stadium; Referee: Nikola Radaković

19 November 2025	Sloven (III)	0–2	Red Star	Ruma
13:00		Report	Radonjić 18'; Ivanić 57'	Stadium: Stadion u Borkovačkoj dolini Attendance: 2,500; Referee: Andrija Stojanović

== Round of 16 ==
The draw for the Round of 16 took place following the Round of 32. The draw was held on 20 November 2025 at the Sports Centre of the Football Association of Serbia (FSS) in Stara Pazova, and matches were played on 2–3 December 2025, consisting of 8 single-legged ties with a penalty shoot-out as the decider if the score was tied after 90 minutes.

2 December 2025	Železničar Pančevo	0–3	Trayal Kruševac (II)

3 December 2025	OFK Vršac	1–2	Vojvodina

3 December 2025	Spartak Subotica (II)	1–1 (3–4 p)	Zemun (II)

3 December 2025	Mačva Šabac (II)	1–1 (2–1 p)	IMT

3 December 2025	RFK Grafičar (II)	3–0	Radnički Niš

3 December 2025	Novi Pazar	4–3	Dubočica (II)

3 December 2025	Borac Čačak (II)	1–2	Jedinstvo Ub (II)

11 February 2026	Budućnost Dobanovci (III)	1–4	Red Star Belgrade

== Quarter-finals ==
4 March 2026	Jedinstvo Ub (II)	2–2 (6–5 p)	Zemun (II)

4 March 2026	Vojvodina	1–1 (2–0 p)	Trayal Kruševac (II)

4 March 2026	RFK Grafičar (II)	1–1 (4–3 p)	Mačva Šabac (II)

5 March 2026	Novi Pazar	0–2	Red Star Belgrade

== Semi-finals ==
Matches to be played on 29 and 30 April 2026 which will consist of 2 single-legged ties, with a penalty shoot-out as the decider if the score is tied after 90 minutes.

29 April 2026	RFK Grafičar (II)	1–2	Vojvodina

30 April 2026	Jedinstvo Ub (II)	1–2	Red Star

== Final ==
13 May 2026
20:00 CEST (UTC+2)

Vojvodina	2−2 (a.e.t.)	Red Star
Szűcs 2'; Vidosavljević 35'	Report	Arnautović 54'; Rodrigão 90+6'
Penalties
Medojević (penalty scored); Szűcs (penalty scored); Mladenović (penalty missed); Ranđelović (penalty scored); Kokanović (penalty scored); Mary (penalty missed)	4−5	(penalty scored) Duarte; (penalty scored) Händel; (penalty scored) Krunić; (penalty missed) Lučić; (penalty scored) Enem; (penalty scored) Rodrigão

Lagator Stadium, Loznica
Attendance: 5,500
Referee: Pavle Ilić
