= 2019–20 Red Star Belgrade season =

Red Star Belgrade
2019–20 season
- President: Svetozar Mijailović
- Manager: Vladan Milojević (until 19 December); Dejan Stanković (from 21 December)
- Stadium: Rajko Mitić Stadium
- Serbian SuperLiga: 1st
- Serbian Cup: Semi-finals
- UEFA Champions League: Group stage
- Top goalscorer: League: Ben (13); All: Ben (14)
- Highest home attendance: League: 38,271 (1 Mar 2020 v Partizan); All: 47,487 (27 Avg 2019 v Young Boys, CL)
- Lowest home attendance: League: 4,218 (30 Oct 2019 v TSC); All: 3,650 (20 Nov 2019 v Mačva, Serbian Cup)
- Average home league attendance: 11266
Home colours	Away colours	Third colours

The 2019–20 Red Star Belgrade season was the club's 14th in the Serbian SuperLiga and 74th consecutive season in the top flight of Yugoslav and Serbian football. The club participated in the Serbian SuperLiga, the Serbian Cup and the UEFA Champions League.

== Pre-season and friendlies ==
19 June 2019 Friendly	Red Star (Serbia)	7–0	(Austria) Windischgarsten	Windischgarsten, Austria
18:30	Ivanić 9'; Boakye 31', 37'; Vukanović 55'; Simić 68', 74'; Krstović 71'	Report		Stadium: Dana Arena; Attendance: 200

22 June 2019 Friendly	Red Star (Serbia)	1–1	(Romania) Cluj	Windischgarsten, Austria
17:30	Savić 67'	Report	Vinícius 80'	Stadium: DANA Arena; Attendance: 200

25 June 2019 Friendly	Red Star (Serbia)	1–1	(Cyprus) Apollon	Windischgarsten, Austria
18:00	Milunović 90'	Report	Zelaya 57'	Stadium: DANA Arena; Attendance: 200

29 June 2019 Friendly	Red Star (Serbia)	0–1	(Russia) Zenit	Bischofshofen, Austria
16:30		Report	Azmoun 38'	Stadium: Sportplatz Bischofshofen; Attendance: 1000

1 July 2019 Friendly	Red Star (Serbia)	3–1	(Austria) Blau-Weiß	Windischgarsten, Austria
18:00	Simić 78'; Ebecilio 81'; Vulić 87'	Report	Mehmeti 85'	Stadium: DANA Arena; Attendance: 100

20 January 2020 Friendly	Red Star (Serbia)	2–0	(Cyprus) Aris Limassol	Paphos, Cyprus
16:00	Gavrić 35'; García 69'	Report		Stadium: Stelios Kyriakides Stadium; Attendance: 0 Referee: Nikolas Neokleous

26 January 2020 Friendly	Red Star (Serbia)	3–2	(Poland) Arka Gdynia	Belek, Turkey
15:30	Degenek 15'; Deja 62' (o.g.); Vukanović 74'	Report	Zbozień 25'; Serrarens 45'	Stadium: SC Regnum; Attendance: 100; Referee: Tunç Özdemir

29 January 2020 Friendly	Red Star (Serbia)	0–0	(North Macedonia) Vardar	Belek, Turkey
15:30		Report		Stadium: SC Regnum; Attendance: 50; Referee: Berkan Çetin

1 February 2020 Friendly	Red Star (Serbia)	1–0	(Bulgaria) Ludogorets	Belek, Turkey
15:00	Gobeljić 28'	Report		Stadium: SC Regnum; Attendance: 100; Referee: Niyazi Balçın

2 February 2020 Friendly	Red Star (Serbia)	1–1	(Slovenia) Celje	Belek, Turkey
14:30	Gavrić 83'	Report	Božić 85'	Stadium: SC Regnum; Attendance: 50; Referee: Kemal Ögen

5 February 2020 Friendly	Red Star (Serbia)	4–0	(Slovakia) Dunajská Streda	Belek, Turkey
15:30	Ben 3'; Jovančić 16'; Petrović 29'; Boakye 57'	Report		Stadium: SC Regnum; Attendance: 50; Referee: Sarper Barış Saka

== Competitions ==
=== Overview ===
Competition	Record							
Competition	P	W	D	L	GF	GA	GD	Win %
Serbian SuperLiga	30	25	3	2	68	18	+50	83.33
Serbian Cup	4	3	0	1	11	2	+9	75.00
UEFA Champions League	14	3	5	6	13	28	−15	21.43
Total	48	31	8	9	92	48	+44	64.58

=== Serbian SuperLiga ===
==== Season results summary ====
Overall								Home						Away					
Pld	W	D	L	GF	GA	GD	Pts	W	D	L	GF	GA	GD	W	D	L	GF	GA	GD
30	25	3	2	68	18	+50	78	14	1	0	36	8	+28	11	2	2	32	10	+22

==== Regular season league table ====
Pos	Team	Pld	W	D	L	GF	GA	GD	Pts	Qualification
1	Red Star Belgrade (C)	30	25	3	2	68	18	+50	78	Qualification for the Champions League first qualifying round
2	Partizan	30	20	4	6	69	25	+44	64	Qualification for the Europa League first qualifying round
3	Vojvodina	30	19	5	6	47	27	+20	62	Qualification for the Europa League third qualifying round (Note: Vojvodina qualified for the Europa League third qualifying round by winning the 2019–20 Serbian Cup. As a result, the spot awarded to the third-placed team (Europa League first qualifying round) was passed to the fourth-placed team.)
4	TSC	30	17	8	5	59	34	+25	59	Qualification for the Europa League first qualifying round
5	Radnički Niš	30	16	4	10	51	37	+14	52	

Source: SuperLiga (in Serbian), Soccerway
Rules for classification: 1) Points; 2) Head-to-head points; 3) Head-to-head goal difference; 4) Head-to-head goals scored; 5) Head-to-head away goals scored (if two teams tied); 6) Goal difference; 7) Goals scored; 8) Fair play ranking; 9) Draw.
(C) Champions

==== Regular season result round by round ====
Round	1	2	3	4	5	6	7	8	9	10	11	12	13	14	15	16	17	18	19	20	21	22	23	24	25	26	27	28	29	30
Result	W	W	W	W	W	W	W	W	L	W	W	W	W	W	W	D	W	W	W	W	W	W	D	D	W	W	W	W	L	W
Position	3	3	4	3	3	4	3	3	2	2	1	1	1	1	1	1	1	1	1	1	1	1	1	1	1	1	1	1	1	1

W = Win; D = Draw; L = Loss

==== Regular season matches ====
20 July 2019 R1	Red Star	2–0	Javor	Rajko Mitić Stadium, Belgrade
20:00	Jovičić 28'; Ben 45' (pen.)	Report		Attendance: 6,112; Referee: Lazar Lukić

27 July 2019 R2	Red Star	2–0	Radnički	Rajko Mitić Stadium, Belgrade
20:00	Pavkov 41'; Ben 85'	Report		Attendance: 5,189; Referee: Jovan Šegrt

9 August 2019 R4	Red Star	2–0	Mladost	Rajko Mitić Stadium, Belgrade
20:00	Vulić 4'; Jevtović 33'	Report		Attendance: 4,663; Referee: Dragan Čolović

17 August 2019 R5	Spartak	2–3	Red Star	Subotica City Stadium, Subotica
20:00	Tufegdžić 6'; Dunđerski 79'	Report	Vulić 37'; Simić 49'; Tomané 85'	Attendance: 6,000; Referee: Novak Simović

31 August 2019 R7	Vojvodina	1–2	Red Star	Karađorđe Stadium, Novi Sad
18:45	Stojković 36'	Report	Pavkov 25'; García 59'	Attendance: 9,000; Referee: Jovan Šegrt

14 September 2019 R8	Red Star	2–1	Inđija	Rajko Mitić Stadium, Belgrade
18:00	Pavkov 88' (pen.), 90' (pen.)	Report	Tomić 35'	Attendance: 8,000; Referee: Igor Stojilković

21 September 2019 R9	Partizan	2–0	Red Star	Partizan Stadium, Belgrade
18:00	Soumah 83'; Tošić 90'	Report		Attendance: 22,000; Referee: Srđan Jovanović

25 September 2019 R3	Voždovac	1–3	Red Star	Voždovac Stadium, Belgrade
19:00	Mašović 31'	Report	Degenek 11'; Ben 26'; Vukanović 52'	Attendance: 1,800; Referee: Bojan Nikolić

28 September 2019 R10	Red Star	3–1	Mačva	Rajko Mitić Stadium, Belgrade
19:00	Tomané 8'; Ben 32'; Cañas 37'	Report	Mijailović 83'	Attendance: 5,864; Referee: Dragan Čolović

5 October 2019 R11	Napredak	0–1	Red Star	Mladost Stadium, Kruševac
16:00		Report	Marin 90+6'	Attendance: 4,500; Referee: Bojan Nikolić

19 October 2019 R12	Red Star	3–1	Rad	Rajko Mitić Stadium, Belgrade
20:00	Pavkov 6'; Marin 39' (pen.); Gobeljić 76'	Report	Perendija 66' (pen.)	Attendance: 7,115; Referee: Đorđe Maksimović

26 October 2019 R13	Radnik	0–5	Red Star	Surdulica City Stadium, Surdulica
15:30		Report	Pavkov 6' (pen.); Vukanović 12'; Ben 37', 57' (pen.); García 65'	Attendance: 2,000; Referee: Miloš Đorđić

30 October 2019 R14	Red Star	3–1	TSC	Rajko Mitić Stadium, Belgrade
18:00	Tomané 12'; Grabež 44' (o.g.); Simić 78'	Report	Jander 63' (o.g.)	Attendance: 4,218; Referee: Jovan Šegrt

2 November 2019 R15	Proleter	0–2	Red Star	Karađorđe Stadium, Novi Sad
16:00		Report	García 59'; Boakye 82'	Attendance: 2,500; Referee: Danilo Grujić

10 November 2019 R16	Javor	1–1	Red Star	Stadion Kraj Moravice, Ivanjica
14:30	Petković 25'	Report	Jevtović 87'	Attendance: 2,500; Referee: Petar Piper

23 November 2019 R17	Radnički	0–2	Red Star	Čair Stadium, Niš
16:00		Report	Ben 40'; Vukanović 77'	Attendance: 5,000; Referee: Novak Simović

30 November 2019 R18	Red Star	2–0	Voždovac	Rajko Mitić Stadium, Belgrade
18:00	Marin 60'; Ben 90'	Report		Attendance: 5,328; Referee: Jovan Šegrt

4 December 2019 R19	Mladost	0–1	Red Star	Mladost Stadium, Lučani
15:00		Report	Ben 63'	Attendance: 1,200; Referee: Lazar Lukić

7 December 2019 R20	Red Star	3–1	Spartak	Rajko Mitić Stadium, Belgrade
15:30	Jander 31'; Tekijaški 40' (o.g.); Tomané 51'	Report	Denković 21'	Attendance: 4,247; Referee: Petar Piper

15 December 2019 R6	Red Star	3–1	Čukarički	Rajko Mitić Stadium, Belgrade
15:00	Milunović 2'; Pavkov 72'; Vukanović 88'	Report	Stojanović 24'	Attendance: 10,151; Referee: Lazar Lukić

15 February 2020 R21	Čukarički	0–2	Red Star	Čukarički Stadium, Belgrade
14:30		Report	Nikolić 5'; Petrović 14'	Attendance: 3,500; Referee: Danilo Grujić

22 February 2020 R22	Red Star	2–0	Vojvodina	Rajko Mitić Stadium, Belgrade
18:00	Ben 18'; Gobeljić 66'	Report		Attendance: 25,816; Referee: Petar Piper

26 February 2020 R23	Inđija	1–1	Red Star	Inđija Stadium, Inđija
14:00	Krasić 36'	Report	Ben 75'	Attendance: 3,500; Referee: Novica Anđelovski

1 March 2020 R24	Red Star	0–0	Partizan	Rajko Mitić Stadium, Belgrade
18:00		Report		Attendance: 38,271; Referee: Lazar Lukić

7 March 2020 R25	Mačva	0–3	Red Star	Stadion FK Mačva, Šabac
16:00		Report	Ben 19', 33'; Babić 37'	Attendance: 3,000; Referee: Dragan Čolović

14 March 2020 R26	Red Star	3–0	Napredak	Rajko Mitić Stadium, Belgrade
18:00	Tomané 22'; Gavrić 53'; Ivanić 88'	Report		Attendance: 0 Referee: Jovan Šegrt

29 May 2020 R27	Rad	0–5	Red Star	King Peter I Stadium, Belgrade
19:30		Report	Ivanić 24' (pen.); Babić 30'; Vukanović 36', 82'; Degenek 57'	Attendance: 0 Referee: Danilo Grujić

6 June 2020 R28	Red Star	4–1	Radnik	Rajko Mitić Stadium, Belgrade
19:00	Pankov 29'; Babić 38'; Radulović 84' (pen.); Simić 90'	Report	Makarić 23'	Attendance: 14,381; Referee: Jovan Šegrt

14 June 2020 R29	TSC	2–1	Red Star	Stadion Senta, Senta
16:30	Varga 12'; Lukić 17'	Report	Milunović 78'	Attendance: 3,000; Referee: Nenad Minaković

20 June 2020 R30	Red Star	2–1	Proleter	Rajko Mitić Stadium, Belgrade
19:15	García 18'; Gajić 37'	Report	Andrejević 6'	Attendance: 18,362; Referee: Marko Ivković

=== Serbian Cup ===
==== First round ====
10 October 2019 R1	Trepča	0–8	Red Star	FSS Sport Center, Stara Pazova
15:00		Report	Simić 3', 28', 49', 60'; van La Parra 50'; Vukanović 54'; Vulić 78'; Tomané 86'	Attendance: 400; Referee: Novak Simović

==== Second round ====
20 November 2019 R2	Red Star	1–0	Mačva	Rajko Mitić Stadium, Belgrade
18:00	Boakye 66'	Report		Attendance: 3,650; Referee: Danilo Grujić

==== Quarterfinal ====
2 June 2020 QF	Inđija	1–2	Red Star	Inđija Stadium, Inđija
17:00	Jovanović 86'	Report	Ivanić 35'; Ben 38'	Attendance: 800; Referee: Jovan Šegrt

==== Semifinal ====
10 June 2020 SF	Partizan	1–0	Red Star	Partizan Stadium, Belgrade
20:00	Natkho 58'	Report		Attendance: 16,000; Referee: Novak Simović

=== UEFA Champions League ===
==== First qualifying round ====
9 July 2019 QR1	Sūduva Marijampolė (Lithuania)	0 – 0	(Serbia) Red Star	Sūduva Stadium, Marijampolė
20:00		Report		Attendance: 3,200; Referee: Jørgen Daugbjerg Burchardt (Denmark)

16 July 2019 QR1	Red Star (Serbia)	2 – 1 (2 – 1 agg.)	(Lithuania) Sūduva Marijampolė	Rajko Mitić Stadium, Belgrade
20:45	Boakye 4'; Marin 29'	Report	Topčagić 90+6'	Attendance: 23.751; Referee: Ádám Farkas (Hungary)

==== Second qualifying round ====
24 July 2019 QR2	Red Star (Serbia)	2 – 0	(Finland) HJK	Rajko Mitić Stadium, Belgrade
20:45	Boakye 27'; Pavkov 90'	Report		Attendance: 36,289; Referee: Paweł Gil (Poland)

31 July 2019 QR2	HJK (Finland)	2 – 1 (2 – 3 agg.)	(Serbia) Red Star	Telia 5G -areena, Helsinki
18:00	Dahlström 46'; Riski 90+2'	Report	Jovančić 56'	Attendance: 9,000; Referee: Alain Bieri (Switzerland)

==== Third qualifying round ====
6 August 2019 QR3	Red Star (Serbia)	1 – 1	(Denmark) Copenhagen	Rajko Mitić Stadium, Belgrade
20:45	Pavkov 44'	Report	Wind 84' (pen.)	Attendance: 40,812; Referee: Tiago Martins (Portugal)

13 August 2019 QR3	Copenhagen (Denmark)	1 – 1 (a.e.t.) (2 – 2 agg.) (6–7 p)	(Serbia) Red Star	Parken Stadium, Copenhagen
20:00	N'Doye 45'	Report	Boakye 17'	Attendance: 29,872; Referee: Gediminas Mažeika (Lithuania)
	Penalties
	Wind (penalty scored); Fischer (penalty missed); Sotiriou (penalty scored); Bengtsson (penalty missed); Zeca (penalty scored); N'Doye (penalty missed); Bartolec (penalty missed); Nelsson (penalty scored); Papagiannopoulos (penalty scored); Grytebust (penalty scored); Wind (penalty missed)		(penalty missed) Marin; (penalty scored) Ivanić; (penalty missed) Jevtović; (penalty scored) Jander; (penalty scored) Pankov; (penalty missed) Jovančić; (penalty missed) Simić; (penalty scored) Degenek; (penalty scored) Gobeljić; (penalty scored) Borjan; (penalty scored) Pankov

==== Play-off round ====
21 August 2019 PO	Young Boys (Switzerland)	2 – 2	(Serbia) Red Star	Stade de Suisse, Bern
21:00	Assalé 7'; Hoarau 76' (pen.)	Report	Degenek 18'; García 46'	Attendance: 26,375; Referee: Danny Makkelie (Netherlands)

27 August 2019 PO	Red Star (Serbia)	1 – 1 (3 – 3 (a) agg.)	(Switzerland) Young Boys	Rajko Mitić Stadium, Belgrade
21:00	Vukanović 59'	Report	Ben 82' (o.g.)	Attendance: 47,487; Referee: Anthony Taylor (England)

==== Group stage ====
Pos	Team	Pld	W	D	L	GF	GA	GD	Pts	Qualification
1	(Germany) Bayern Munich	6	6	0	0	24	5	+19	18	Advance to knockout phase
2	(England) Tottenham Hotspur	6	3	1	2	18	14	+4	10	Advance to knockout phase
3	(Greece) Olympiacos	6	1	1	4	8	14	−6	4	Transfer to Europa League
4	(Serbia) Red Star Belgrade	6	1	0	5	3	20	−17	3	

Source: UEFA
Rules for classification: Group stage tiebreakers

18 September 2019 MD1	Bayern Munich (Germany)	3–0	(Serbia) Red Star	Allianz Arena, Munich
21:00	Coman 34'; Lewandowski 80'; Müller 90+1'	Report		Attendance: 70,000; Referee: Bobby Madden (Scotland)

1 October 2019 MD2	Red Star (Serbia)	3–1	(Greece) Olympiacos	Rajko Mitić Stadium, Belgrade
21:00	Vulić 62'; Milunović 87'; Boakye 90'	Report	Semedo 37'	Attendance: 43,291; Referee: Benoît Bastien (France)

22 October 2019 MD3	Tottenham Hotspur (England)	5–0	(Serbia) Red Star	Tottenham Hotspur Stadium, London
21:00	Kane 9', 72'; Son 16', 44'; Lamela 57'	Report		Attendance: 51,743; Referee: Marco Guida (Italy)

6 November 2019 MD4	Red Star (Serbia)	0–4	(England) Tottenham Hotspur	Rajko Mitić Stadium, Belgrade
21:00		Report	Lo Celso 34'; Son 57', 61'; Eriksen 85'	Attendance: 42,381; Referee: Carlos del Cerro Grande (Spain)

26 November 2019 MD5	Red Star (Serbia)	0–6	(Germany) Bayern Munich	Rajko Mitić Stadium, Belgrade
21:00		Report	Goretzka 14'; Lewandowski 53' (pen.), 60', 64', 68'; Tolisso 90'	Attendance: 44,118; Referee: Björn Kuipers (Netherlands)

11 December 2019 MD6	Olympiacos (Greece)	1–0	(Serbia) Red Star	Karaiskakis Stadium, Piraeus
21:00	El-Arabi 87' (pen.)	Report		Attendance: 31,898; Referee: Daniele Orsato (Italy)

== Squad ==
=== Squad statistics ===
No.	Pos	Nat	Player	Total		SuperLiga		Cup		Champions League	
No.	Pos	Nat	Player	Apps	Goals	Apps	Goals	Apps	Goals	Apps	Goals
Goalkeepers
1	GK	(Serbia) SRB	Zoran Popović	6	0	4	0	2	0	0	0
51	GK	(Serbia) SRB	Andrija Katić	0	0	0	0	0	0	0	0
82	GK	(Canada) CAN	Milan Borjan	42	0	26	0	2	0	14	0
Defenders
2	DF	(Serbia) SRB	Milan Gajić	16	1	15	1	1	0	0	0
5	DF	(Australia) AUS	Miloš Degenek	37	3	23	2	3	0	11	1
6	DF	(Serbia) SRB	Radovan Pankov	28	1	23	1	2	0	3	0
15	DF	(Serbia) SRB	Srđan Babić	17	3	11	3	2	0	4	0
19	DF	(Serbia) SRB	Nemanja Milunović	35	3	20	2	2	0	13	1
23	DF	(Serbia) SRB	Milan Rodić	33	0	18	0	2	0	13	0
33	DF	(Serbia) SRB	Marko Konatar	1	0	1	0	0	0	0	0
77	DF	(Serbia) SRB	Marko Gobeljić	32	2	17	2	3	0	12	0
Midfielders
3	MF	(Serbia) SRB	Branko Jovičić	12	1	7	1	2	0	3	0
7	MF	(Serbia) SRB	Miloš Vulić	27	4	21	2	2	1	4	1
8	MF	(Montenegro) MNE	Mirko Ivanić	31	3	19	2	2	1	10	0
11	MF	(Argentina) ARG	Mateo García	24	5	15	4	1	0	8	1
20	MF	(Serbia) SRB	Njegoš Petrović	25	1	17	1	2	0	6	0
21	MF	(Serbia) SRB	Veljko Simić	20	7	17	3	2	4	1	0
22	MF	(Serbia) SRB	Veljko Nikolić	12	1	11	1	1	0	0	0
24	MF	(Serbia) SRB	Željko Gavrić	11	1	9	1	2	0	0	0
29	MF	(Serbia) SRB	Dušan Jovančić	27	1	14	0	3	0	10	1
35	MF	(Ivory Coast) CIV	Sékou Sanogo	1	0	1	0	0	0	0	0
49	MF	(Serbia) SRB	Andrija Radulović	4	1	3	1	1	0	0	0
87	MF	(Spain) ESP	José Cañas	21	1	9	1	1	0	11	0
Forwards
9	FW	(Serbia) SRB	Milan Pavkov	29	9	20	7	1	0	8	2
14	FW	(Ghana) GHA	Richmond Boakye	25	6	10	1	2	1	13	4
17	FW	(Portugal) POR	Tomané	26	6	18	5	3	1	5	0
31	FW	(Comoros) COM	Ben	29	14	21	13	2	1	6	0
40	FW	(Serbia) SRB	Borisav Burmaz	1	0	0	0	1	0	0	0
92	FW	(Serbia) SRB	Aleksa Vukanović	35	8	20	6	4	1	11	1
Players transferred out during the season
10	MF	(Germany) GER	Marko Marin	27	4	12	3	1	0	14	1
18	DF	(Brazil) BRA	Jander	15	1	8	1	1	0	6	0
30	DF	(Montenegro) MNE	Filip Stojković	4	0	1	0	0	0	3	0
30	MF	(Serbia) SRB	Miloš Pantović	1	0	0	0	1	0	0	0
33	MF	(Serbia) SRB	Milan Jevtović	11	2	6	2	2	0	3	0
91	MF	(Netherlands) NED	Rajiv van La Parra	11	1	4	0	2	1	5	0
99	FW	(Montenegro) MNE	Nikola Krstović	6	0	6	0	0	0	0	0

Last updated: 14 June 2020
Source: Competitions

=== Goalscorers ===
Includes all competitive matches. The list is sorted by shirt number when total goals are equal.

As of 20 June 2019

Rank	Pos	No.	Player	League	Cup	Champions League	Total
1	FW	31	(Comoros) Ben	13	1	0	14
2	FW	9	(Serbia) Milan Pavkov	7	0	2	9
3	FW	92	(Serbia) Aleksa Vukanović	6	1	1	8
4	MF	21	(Serbia) Veljko Simić	3	4	0	7
5	FW	14	(Ghana) Richmond Boakye	1	1	4	6
5	FW	17	(Portugal) Tomané	5	1	0	6
7	MF	11	(Argentina) Mateo García	4	0	1	5
8	MF	8	(Serbia) Miloš Vulić	2	1	1	4
8	MF	10	(Germany) Marko Marin	3	0	1	4
10	DF	5	(Australia) Miloš Degenek	2	0	1	3
10	MF	8	(Montenegro) Mirko Ivanić	2	1	0	3
10	DF	15	(Serbia) Srđan Babić	3	0	0	3
10	DF	19	(Serbia) Nemanja Milunović	2	0	1	3
14	MF	33	(Serbia) Milan Jevtović	2	0	0	2
14	DF	77	(Serbia) Marko Gobeljić	2	0	0	2
16	DF	2	(Serbia) Milan Gajić	1	0	0	1
16	MF	3	(Serbia) Branko Jovičić	1	0	0	1
16	DF	6	(Serbia) Radovan Pankov	1	0	0	1
16	DF	18	(Brazil) Jander	1	0	0	1
16	MF	20	(Serbia) Njegoš Petrović	1	0	0	1
16	DF	22	(Serbia) Veljko Nikolić	1	0	0	1
16	MF	24	(Serbia) Željko Gavrić	1	0	0	1
16	MF	29	(Serbia) Dušan Jovančić	0	0	1	1
16	MF	49	(Serbia) Andrija Radulović	1	0	0	1
16	MF	87	(Spain) José Cañas	1	0	0	1
16	MF	91	(Netherlands) Rajiv van La Parra	0	1	0	1
Own goals				2	0	0	2
TOTALS				68	11	13	92

=== Clean sheets ===
Includes all competitive matches. The list is sorted by shirt number when total clean sheets are equal.

As of 29 May 2020

Rank	No.	Player	League	Cup	Champions League	Total
1	82	(Canada) Milan Borjan	13	0	2	15
2	1	(Serbia) Zoran Popović	2	2	0	4
TOTALS			15	2	2	19

=== Disciplinary record ===
As of 20 June 2020

Rank	No.	Pos	Player	League			Cup			Champions League			Total		
Rank	No.	Pos	Player	Yellow card	(yellow card) (yellow-red card)	Red card	Yellow card	(yellow card) (yellow-red card)	Red card	Yellow card	(yellow card) (yellow-red card)	Red card	Yellow card	(yellow card) (yellow-red card)	Red card
1	77	DF	(Serbia) Marko Gobeljić	0	0	0	1	0	0	1	0	1	2	0	1
2	19	DF	(Serbia) Nemanja Milunović	4	0	0	0	0	0	4	1	0	8	1	0
3	7	MF	(Serbia) Miloš Vulić	1	1	0	1	0	0	1	0	0	3	1	0
4	17	FW	(Portugal) Tomané	0	0	0	0	0	0	0	1	0	0	1	0
5	23	DF	(Serbia) Milan Rodić	3	0	0	1	0	0	4	0	0	8	0	0
6	5	DF	(Australia) Miloš Degenek	1	0	0	1	0	0	4	0	0	6	0	0
6	29	MF	(Serbia) Dušan Jovančić	1	0	0	0	0	0	4	0	0	5	0	0
8	9	FW	(Serbia) Milan Pavkov	3	0	0	1	0	0	0	0	0	4	0	0
8	14	FW	(Ghana) Richmond Boakye	1	0	0	0	0	0	3	0	0	4	0	0
8	20	MF	(Serbia) Njegoš Petrović	2	0	0	0	0	0	2	0	0	4	0	0
8	31	FW	(Comoros) Ben	1	0	0	1	0	0	2	0	0	4	0	0
8	82	GK	(Canada) Milan Borjan	2	0	0	0	0	0	2	0	0	4	0	0
13	10	MF	(Germany) Marko Marin	0	0	0	0	0	0	3	0	0	3	0	0
14	2	DF	(Serbia) Milan Gajić	2	0	0	0	0	0	0	0	0	2	0	0
14	6	DF	(Serbia) Radovan Pankov	2	0	0	0	0	0	0	0	0	2	0	0
14	15	DF	(Serbia) Srđan Babić	0	0	0	1	0	0	1	0	0	2	0	0
14	18	DF	(Brazil) Jander	0	0	0	0	0	0	2	0	0	2	0	0
14	91	MF	(Netherlands) Rajiv van La Parra	1	0	0	0	0	0	1	0	0	2	0	0
14	92	FW	(Serbia) Aleksa Vukanović	2	0	0	0	0	0	0	0	0	2	0	0
20	3	MF	(Serbia) Branko Jovičić	0	0	0	0	0	0	1	0	0	1	0	0
20	10	MF	(Montenegro) Mirko Ivanić	0	0	0	0	0	0	1	0	0	1	0	0
20	21	DF	(Serbia) Veljko Simić	1	0	0	0	0	0	0	0	0	1	0	0
20	22	MD	(Serbia) Veljko Nikolić	1	0	0	0	0	0	0	0	0	1	0	0
20	30	DF	(Montenegro) Filip Stojković	0	0	0	0	0	0	1	0	0	1	0	0
20	33	MD	(Serbia) Milan Jevtović	1	0	0	0	0	0	0	0	0	1	0	0
TOTALS				29	1	0	7	0	0	37	2	1	73	3	1

== Transfers ==
=== In ===
#	Pos.	Player	Transferred from	Date	Fee
Summer
6	DF	(Serbia) Radovan Pankov	(Serbia) Radnički Niš	31 May 2019	Undisclosed (~ €300,000)
27	GK	(Serbia) Nikola Vasiljević	(Serbia) Radnik Surdulica	21 June 2019	Undisclosed (~ €300,000)
	MF	(Serbia) Stefan Fićović	(Serbia) Borac Čačak	22 June 2019	Free
87	MF	(Spain) José Cañas	(Greece) PAOK	27 June 2019	Free
	MF	(The Gambia) Ousman Marong	(Serbia) Trajal	27 June 2019	Free
17	FW	(Portugal) Tomané	(Portugal) Tondela	2 July 2019	Undisclosed (~ €750,000)
18	DF	(Brazil) Jander	(Cyprus) Pafos	3 July 2019	Undisclosed (~ €200,000)
5	DF	(Australia) Miloš Degenek	(Saudi Arabia) Al-Hilal	22 July 2019	Undisclosed (~ €1,500,000)
20	MF	(Serbia) Njegoš Petrović	(Serbia) Rad	5 August 2019	Undisclosed (~ €400,000)
11	MF	(Argentina) Mateo García	(Spain) Las Palmas	18 August 2019	Undisclosed (~ €1,800,000)
91	MF	(Netherlands) Rajiv van La Parra	(England) Huddersfield Town	1 September 2019	Undisclosed (~ €1,250,000)
Winter
35	MF	(Ivory Coast) Sékou Sanogo	(Saudi Arabia) Al-Ittihad	21 January 2020	Loan
	MF	(Ghana) Ibrahim Mustapha	(Ghana) EurAfrica	28 January 2020	Undisclosed
	FW	(Slovenia) Vanja Panić	(Slovenia) Olimpija Ljubljana	6 February 2020	Undisclosed (~ €250,000)

=== Out ===
#	Pos.	Player	Transferred to	Date	Fee
Summer
10	MF	(Serbia) Nenad Milijaš	–	19 May 2019	Retired
27	GK	(Bosnia and Herzegovina) Nemanja Supić	–	19 May 2019	Retired
22	FW	(Brazil) Jonathan Cafu	(France) Bordeaux	1 July 2019	Loan return
28	FW	(Serbia) Dejan Joveljić	(Germany) Eintracht Frankfurt	1 July 2019	Undisclosed (~ €4,000,000)
37	DF	(Ghana) Rashid Sumaila	(Kuwait) Qadsia	1 July 2019	Loan return
93	DF	(Serbia) Aleksa Terzić	(Italy) Fiorentina	1 July 2019	Undisclosed (~ €1,500,000)
	GK	(Serbia) Luka Krstović	(Serbia) TSC Bačka Topola	1 July 2019	Free
44	DF	(Brazil) Zé Marcos	(Brazil) Avaí	5 July 2019	Free
	FW	(Ghana) Ibrahim Tanko	(Serbia) Mladost Lučani	3 July 2019	Free
20	MF	(Serbia) Goran Čaušić	(Russia) Arsenal Tula	7 July 2019	Undisclosed (~ €500,000)
	DF	(Serbia) Damjan Daničić	(Serbia) Voždovac	8 July 2019	Free
90	DF	(Serbia) Vujadin Savić	(Cyprus) APOEL	14 July 2019	Free
11	MF	(Netherlands) Lorenzo Ebecilio	(Japan) Jubilo Iwata	27 July 2019	Undisclosed (~ €500,000)
	FW	(Serbia) Mihajlo Baić	(Serbia) Spartak Subotica	24 August 2019	Undisclosed
	MF	(Serbia) Bogdan Jočić	(Italy) Verona	30 August 2019	Undisclosed (~ €500,000)
30	DF	(Montenegro) Filip Stojković	(Austria) Rapid Wien	30 August 2019	Free
Winter
10	MF	(Germany) Marko Marin	(Saudi Arabia) Al-Ahli	5 January 2020	Undisclosed (~ €2,200,000)
	GK	(Serbia) Luka Savić	(Serbia) Sloboda Užice	14 January 2020	Undisclosed
	MF	(Serbia) Edin Ajdinović	(Serbia) Voždovac	17 January 2020	Undisclosed
	FW	(North Macedonia) Strahinja Krstevski	(Georgia (country)) Samtredia	5 February 2020	Undisclosed
	MF	(Serbia) Mihailo Đorđević	(Serbia) OFK Beograd	9 February 2020	Undisclosed
	FW	(Serbia) Marko Dedijer	(Serbia) Rad	9 February 2020	Undisclosed
18	DF	(Brazil) Jander	–	1 April 2020	Contract Terminated
91	MF	(Netherlands) Rajiv van La Parra	–	1 April 2020	Contract Terminated

=== Loan returns and promotions ===
#	Position	Player	Returned from	Date
Summer
22	MF	(Serbia) Veljko Nikolić	(Serbia) Grafičar Beograd	1 July 2019
32	GK	(Serbia) Aleksandar Stanković	(Serbia) Grafičar Beograd	1 July 2019
99	FW	(Montenegro) Nikola Krstović	(Montenegro) Zeta	1 July 2019
30	MF	(Serbia) Miloš Pantović	Promoted from youth	10 October 2019
40	FW	(Serbia) Borisav Burmaz	Promoted from youth	10 October 2019
Winter
24	MF	(Serbia) Željko Gavrić	(Serbia) Grafičar Beograd	10 January 2020
33	DF	(Serbia) Marko Konatar	(Serbia) Grafičar Beograd	24 January 2020
51	GK	(Serbia) Andrija Katić	Promoted from youth	17 February 2020
49	MF	(Serbia) Andrija Radulović	Promoted from youth	6 June 2020

=== Loan out ===
#	Position	Player	Loaned to	Date
Summer
	MF	(Serbia) Stefan Fićović	(Serbia) Grafičar	1 July 2019
	MF	(The Gambia) Ousman Marong	(Serbia) Grafičar	1 July 2019
	FW	(Serbia) Njegoš Kupusović	(Germany) Erzgebirge Aue	1 July 2019
	FW	(Serbia) Dejan Vidić	(Serbia) Grafičar	1 July 2019
	MF	(Serbia) Mateja Stojanović	(Serbia) Bačka BP	1 July 2019
	MF	(Serbia) Nenad Adžibaba	(Serbia) Zemun	1 July 2019
8	MF	(Serbia) Dejan Meleg	(Serbia) Radnički Niš	4 July 2019
36	MF	(Slovakia) Erik Jirka	(Serbia) Radnički Niš	4 July 2019
	MF	(Serbia) Stefan Cvetković	(Serbia) Čukarički	8 July 2019
34	DF	(Serbia) Stefan Hajdin	(Serbia) Voždovac	25 July 2019
	FW	(North Macedonia) Strahinja Krstevski	(North Macedonia) Rabotnički	8 August 2019
Winter
33	MF	(Serbia) Milan Jevtović	(Cyprus) APOEL	10 January 2020
36	MF	(Slovakia) Erik Jirka	(Poland) Górnik Zabrze	10 January 2020
	GK	(Serbia) Miloš Čupić	(Serbia) Grafičar	13 January 2020
30	MF	(Serbia) Miloš Pantović	(Serbia) Grafičar	13 January 2020
	MF	(Serbia) Stefan Cvetković	(Serbia) Grafičar	13 January 2020
	MF	(Kenya) Richard Odada	(Serbia) Grafičar	13 January 2020
	FW	(Serbia) Uroš Milovanović	(Serbia) Grafičar	13 January 2020
51	GK	(Serbia) Miloš Gordić	(Serbia) Mačva Šabac	22 January 2020
	FW	(Serbia) Dejan Vidić	(Serbia) Napredak Kruševac	3 February 2020
27	GK	(Serbia) Nikola Vasiljević	(Serbia) Radnik Surdulica	4 February 2020
32	GK	(Serbia) Aleksandar Stanković	(Serbia) Napredak Kruševac	4 February 2020
99	FW	(Montenegro) Nikola Krstović	(Serbia) Grafičar	4 February 2020

== See also ==
- 2019–20 KK Crvena zvezda season
