= 2019–20 UEFA Champions League qualifying =

European football tournament

2019–20 UEFA Champions League qualifying was the preliminary phase of the 2019–20 UEFA Champions League, prior to the competition proper. Qualification consisted of the qualifying phase (preliminary and first to third rounds) and the play-off round. It began on 25 June and ended on 28 August 2019.

A total of 53 teams compete in the qualifying system of the 2019–20 UEFA Champions League, with 43 teams in Champions Path and 10 teams in League Path. The six winners in the play-off round (four from Champions Path, two from League Path) advanced to the group stage, to join the 26 teams that enter in the group stage.

Times are CEST (UTC+2), as listed by UEFA (local times, if different, are in parentheses).

== Teams ==
=== Champions Path ===
The Champions Path includes all league champions which do not qualify directly for the group stage, and consists of the following rounds:

- Preliminary round (4 teams playing one-legged semi-finals and final): 4 teams which enter in this round.
- First qualifying round (32 teams): 31 teams which enter in this round, and 1 winner of the preliminary round.
- Second qualifying round (20 teams): 4 teams which enter in this round, and 16 winners of the first qualifying round.
- Third qualifying round (12 teams): 2 teams which enter in this round, and 10 winners of the second qualifying round.
- Play-off round (8 teams): 2 teams which enter in this round, and 6 winners of the third qualifying round.

All teams eliminated from the Champions Path enter the Europa League:

- The 3 losers of the preliminary round and 15 of the 16 losers of the first qualifying round (excluding 1 team which receives a bye to the third qualifying round as decided by an additional draw held after the Champions League first qualifying round draw) enter the Champions Path second qualifying round.
- The loser of the first qualifying round which receives a bye and the 10 losers of the second qualifying round enter the Champions Path third qualifying round.
- The 6 losers of the third qualifying round enter the Champions Path play-off round.
- The 4 losers of the play-off round enter the group stage.

Below are the participating teams of the Champions Path (with their 2019 UEFA club coefficients), grouped by their starting rounds.

Key to colours
Winners of play-off round advance to group stage
Losers of play-off round enter Europa League group stage
Losers of third qualifying round enter Europa League play-off round
Losers of second qualifying round (and 1 loser of first qualifying round) enter Europa League third qualifying round
Losers of the preliminary round and first qualifying round enter Europa League second qualifying round

Play-off round
Team	Coeff.
(Switzerland) Young Boys	27.500
(Czech Republic) Slavia Prague	21.500

Third qualifying round
Team	Coeff.
(Netherlands) Ajax	70.500
(Greece) PAOK	23.500

Second qualifying round
Team	Coeff.
(Denmark) Copenhagen	31.000
(Croatia) Dinamo Zagreb	29.500
(Cyprus) APOEL	25.500
(Israel) Maccabi Tel Aviv	16.000

First qualifying round
Team	Coeff.
(Scotland) Celtic	31.000
(Belarus) BATE Borisov	27.500
(Kazakhstan) Astana	27.500
(Bulgaria) Ludogorets Razgrad	27.000
(Azerbaijan) Qarabağ	22.000
(Slovenia) Maribor	18.500
(Serbia) Red Star Belgrade	16.750
(Moldova) Sheriff Tiraspol	12.250
(Norway) Rosenborg	11.500
(Finland) HJK	9.000
(Republic of Ireland) Dundalk	7.000
(Luxembourg) F91 Dudelange	6.250
(North Macedonia) Shkëndija	6.000
(Wales) The New Saints	6.000
(Slovakia) Slovan Bratislava	6.000
(Sweden) AIK	5.500
(Lithuania) Sūduva	4.250
(Malta) Valletta	4.250
(Bosnia and Herzegovina) Sarajevo	4.250
(Poland) Piast Gliwice	3.850
(Romania) CFR Cluj	3.500
(Hungary) Ferencváros	3.500
(Estonia) Nõmme Kalju	3.500
(Montenegro) Sutjeska	3.000
(Albania) Partizani	3.000
(Iceland) Valur	2.750
(Northern Ireland) Linfield	2.250
(Faroe Islands) HB	1.500
(Latvia) Riga	1.125
Ararat-Armenia	1.050
(Georgia (country)) Saburtalo Tbilisi	0.950

Preliminary round
Team	Coeff.
(Gibraltar) Lincoln Red Imps	4.250
(Andorra) FC Santa Coloma	4.000
(San Marino) Tre Penne	0.750
(Kosovo) Feronikeli	0.500

=== League Path ===
The League Path includes all league non-champions which do not qualify directly for the group stage, and consists of the following rounds:

- Second qualifying round (4 teams): 4 teams which enter in this round.
- Third qualifying round (8 teams): 6 teams which enter in this round, and 2 winners of the second qualifying round.
- Play-off round (4 teams): 4 winners of the third qualifying round.

All teams eliminated from the League Path enter the Europa League:

- The 2 losers of the second qualifying round enter the Main Path third qualifying round.
- The 4 losers of the third qualifying round and the 2 losers of the play-off round enter the group stage.

Below are the participating teams of the League Path (with their 2019 UEFA club coefficients), grouped by their starting rounds.

Key to colours
Winners of play-off round advance to group stage
Losers of play-off round and third qualifying round enter Europa League group stage
Losers of second qualifying round enter Europa League third qualifying round

Third qualifying round
Team	Coeff.
(Portugal) Porto	93.000
(Ukraine) Dynamo Kyiv	65.000
(Belgium) Club Brugge	39.500
(Russia) Krasnodar	34.500
(Turkey) İstanbul Başakşehir	10.500
(Austria) LASK	6.250

Second qualifying round
Team	Coeff.
(Switzerland) Basel	54.500
(Greece) Olympiacos	44.000
(Netherlands) PSV Eindhoven	37.000
(Czech Republic) Viktoria Plzeň	33.000

== Format ==
Each tie, apart from the preliminary round, is played over two legs, with each team playing one leg at home. The team that scores more goals on aggregate over the two legs advance to the next round. If the aggregate score is level, the away goals rule is applied, i.e. the team that scores more goals away from home over the two legs advances. If away goals are also equal, then extra time is played. The away goals rule is again applied after extra time, i.e. if there are goals scored during extra time and the aggregate score is still level, the visiting team advances by virtue of more away goals scored. If no goals are scored during extra time, the tie is decided by penalty shoot-out. In the preliminary round, where single-match semi-finals and final are hosted by one of the participating teams, if scores are level at the end of normal time, extra time is played, followed by penalty shoot-out if scores remain tied.

In the draws for each round, teams are seeded based on their UEFA club coefficients at the beginning of the season, with the teams divided into seeded and unseeded pots containing the same number of teams. A seeded team is drawn against an unseeded team, with the order of legs (or the administrative "home" team in the preliminary round matches) in each tie decided by draw. As the identity of the winners of the previous round is not known at the time of the draws, the seeding is carried out under the assumption that the team with the higher coefficient of an undecided tie advances to this round, which means if the team with the lower coefficient is to advance, it simply take the seeding of its opponent. Prior to the draws, UEFA may form "groups" in accordance with the principles set by the Club Competitions Committee, but they are purely for convenience of the draw and do not resemble any real groupings in the sense of the competition. Teams from associations with political conflicts as decided by UEFA may not be drawn into the same tie. After the draws, the order of legs of a tie may be reversed by UEFA due to scheduling or venue conflicts.

== Schedule ==
The schedule is as follows (all draws are held at the UEFA headquarters in Nyon, Switzerland).

Qualifying phase and play-off round schedule
Round	Draw date	First leg	Second leg
Preliminary round	11 June 2019	25 June 2019 (semi-final round)	28 June 2019 (final round)
First qualifying round	18 June 2019	9–10 July 2019	16–17 July 2019
Second qualifying round	19 June 2019	23–24 July 2019	30–31 July 2019
Third qualifying round	22 July 2019	6–7 August 2019	13 August 2019
Play-off round	5 August 2019	20–21 August 2019	27–28 August 2019

== Preliminary round ==
The draw for the preliminary round was held on 11 June 2019, 12:00 CEST, to determine the matchups of the semi-finals and the administrative "home" team of each semi-final and final.

=== Seeding ===
A total of four teams were involved in the preliminary round draw. Two teams were seeded and two teams were unseeded for the semi-final round draw.

Seeded	Unseeded
(Gibraltar) Lincoln Red Imps; (Andorra) FC Santa Coloma	(San Marino) Tre Penne; (Kosovo) Feronikeli

=== Bracket ===
Semi-final round
25 June – Pristina
(Kosovo) Feronikeli	1
(Gibraltar) Lincoln Red Imps	0
25 June – Pristina
(San Marino) Tre Penne	0
(Andorra) FC Santa Coloma	1

Final round
28 June – Pristina
(Kosovo) Feronikeli	2
(Andorra) FC Santa Coloma	1

=== Summary ===
The semi-final round was played on 25 June, and the final round on 28 June 2019, both at the Fadil Vokrri Stadium in Pristina, Kosovo.

Team 1	Score	Team 2
Semi-final round
Feronikeli (Kosovo)	1–0	(Gibraltar) Lincoln Red Imps
Tre Penne (San Marino)	0–1	(Andorra) FC Santa Coloma
Final round
Feronikeli (Kosovo)	2–1	(Andorra) FC Santa Coloma

=== Semi-final round ===
25 June 2019
15:00

Tre Penne (San Marino)	0–1	(Andorra) FC Santa Coloma
	Report	Camochu 76'

Fadil Vokrri Stadium, Pristina
Attendance: 35
Referee: Ian McNabb (Northern Ireland)

25 June 2019
20:45

Feronikeli (Kosovo)	1–0	(Gibraltar) Lincoln Red Imps
M. Hoti 3'	Report

Fadil Vokrri Stadium, Pristina
Attendance: 3,000
Referee: Fedayi San (Switzerland)

=== Final round ===
28 June 2019
20:45

Feronikeli (Kosovo)	2–1	(Andorra) FC Santa Coloma
Zeka 58'; Rexha 87'	Report	Sosa 52'

Fadil Vokrri Stadium, Pristina
Attendance: 1,900
Referee: Emmanouil Skoulas (Greece)

== First qualifying round ==
The draw for the first qualifying round was held on 18 June 2019, 14:30 CEST.

=== Seeding ===
A total of 32 teams were involved in the first qualifying round draw: 31 teams entering in this round, and the winners of the preliminary round. They were divided into three groups: two groups of ten teams, where five teams were seeded and five teams were unseeded; and one group of twelve teams, where six teams were seeded and six teams were unseeded.

Group 1		Group 2		Group 3	
Seeded	Unseeded	Seeded	Unseeded	Seeded	Unseeded
(Kazakhstan) Astana; (Bulgaria) Ludogorets Razgrad; (Serbia) Red Star Belgrade; (North Macedonia) Shkëndija; (Sweden) AIK	(Lithuania) Sūduva; (Romania) CFR Cluj; (Hungary) Ferencváros; (Estonia) Nõmme Kalju; Ararat-Armenia	(Scotland) Celtic; (Azerbaijan) Qarabağ; (Moldova) Sheriff Tiraspol; (Luxembourg) F91 Dudelange; (Slovakia) Slovan Bratislava	(Malta) Valletta; (Bosnia and Herzegovina) Sarajevo; (Montenegro) Sutjeska; (Albania) Partizani; (Georgia (country)) Saburtalo Tbilisi	(Belarus) BATE Borisov; (Slovenia) Maribor; (Norway) Rosenborg; (Finland) HJK; (Republic of Ireland) Dundalk; (Wales) The New Saints	(Kosovo) Feronikeli; (Poland) Piast Gliwice; (Iceland) Valur; (Northern Ireland) Linfield; (Faroe Islands) HB; (Latvia) Riga

Notes

1. ^{†} Winners of the preliminary round. Teams in italics defeated a team with a higher coefficient, thus effectively taking the coefficient of their opponent in the draw.

=== Summary ===
The first legs were played on 9 and 10 July, and the second legs on 16 and 17 July 2019.

Team 1	Agg.	Team 2	1st leg	2nd leg
Nõmme Kalju (Estonia)	2–2 (a)	(North Macedonia) Shkëndija	0–1	2–1
Sūduva (Lithuania)	1–2	(Serbia) Red Star Belgrade	0–0	1–2
Ararat-Armenia	3–4	(Sweden) AIK	2–1	1–3
Astana (Kazakhstan)	2–3	(Romania) CFR Cluj	1–0	1–3
Ferencváros (Hungary)	5–3 (Note: Following a mistake with the original draw not following the correct procedure, UEFA performed a re-draw to establish the home team for each leg in the Ferencváros-Ludogorets Razgrad tie. As a result, the order of legs was reversed. The error did not affect any other tie.)	(Bulgaria) Ludogorets Razgrad	2–1	3–2
Partizani (Albania)	0–2	(Azerbaijan) Qarabağ	0–0	0–2
Slovan Bratislava (Slovakia)	2–2 (2–3 p)	(Montenegro) Sutjeska	1–1	1–1 (a.e.t.)
Sarajevo (Bosnia and Herzegovina)	2–5 (Note: Order of legs reversed after original draw; losers drawn to receive a bye to the Europa League third qualifying round.)	(Scotland) Celtic	1–3	1–2
Sheriff Tiraspol (Moldova)	3–4	(Georgia (country)) Saburtalo Tbilisi	0–3	3–1
F91 Dudelange (Luxembourg)	3–3 (a)	(Malta) Valletta	2–2	1–1
Linfield (Northern Ireland)	0–6	(Norway) Rosenborg	0–2	0–4
Valur (Iceland)	0–5	(Slovenia) Maribor	0–3	0–2
Dundalk (Republic of Ireland)	0–0 (5–4 p)	(Latvia) Riga	0–0	0–0 (a.e.t.)
The New Saints (Wales)	3–2	(Kosovo) Feronikeli	2–2	1–0
HJK (Finland)	5–2	(Faroe Islands) HB	3–0	2–2
BATE Borisov (Belarus)	3–2	(Poland) Piast Gliwice	1–1	2–1

=== Matches ===
9 July 2019
18:00 (19:00 UTC+3)

Nõmme Kalju (Estonia)	0–1	(North Macedonia) Shkëndija
	Report	A. Ibraimi 81' (pen.)

Kadriorg Stadium, Tallinn (Note: Nõmme Kalju played their first qualifying round home match at Kadriorg Stadium, Tallinn and second qualifying round home match at Lilleküla Stadium, Tallinn, instead of their regular stadium Hiiu Stadium, Tallinn which did not meet UEFA requirements.)
Attendance: 1,640
Referee: Donald Robertson (Scotland)
16 July 2019
17:00

Shkëndija (North Macedonia)	1–2	(Estonia) Nõmme Kalju
A. Ibraimi 62' (pen.)	Report	Uggè 6'; Liliu 90+1'

Toše Proeski Arena, Skopje (Note: Shkëndija played their home match at Toše Proeski Arena, Skopje, instead of their regular stadium Ecolog Arena, Tetovo which was undergoing renovation.)
Attendance: 2,546
Referee: Alain Bieri (Switzerland)

2–2 on aggregate; Nõmme Kalju won on away goals.

9 July 2019
20:00 (21:00 UTC+3)

Sūduva (Lithuania)	0–0	(Serbia) Red Star Belgrade
	Report

Sūduva Stadium, Marijampolė
Attendance: 3,200
Referee: Jørgen Daugbjerg Burchardt (Denmark)
16 July 2019
20:45

Red Star Belgrade (Serbia)	2–1	(Lithuania) Sūduva
Boakye 4'; Marin 29'	Report	Topčagić 90+6'

Red Star Stadium, Belgrade
Attendance: 23,751
Referee: Ádám Farkas (Hungary)

Red Star Belgrade won 2–1 on aggregate.

9 July 2019
16:00 (18:00 UTC+4)

Ararat-Armenia	2–1	(Sweden) AIK
Avetisyan 3' (pen.), 45'	Report	Obasi 39'

Yerevan Football Academy Stadium, Yerevan
Attendance: 1,497
Referee: Duje Strukan (Croatia)
17 July 2019
19:00

AIK (Sweden)	3–1	Ararat-Armenia
Goitom 47', 52'; Larsson 62' (pen.)	Report	Kobyalko 77'

Friends Arena, Solna
Attendance: 11,382
Referee: Robert Hennessy (Republic of Ireland)

AIK won 4–3 on aggregate.

9 July 2019
15:00 (19:00 UTC+6)

Astana (Kazakhstan)	1–0	(Romania) CFR Cluj
Postnikov 68'	Report

Astana Arena, Nur-Sultan
Attendance: 18,587
Referee: Lawrence Visser (Belgium)
17 July 2019
20:00 (21:00 UTC+3)

CFR Cluj (Romania)	3–1	(Kazakhstan) Astana
Omrani 10', 26', 73'	Report	Murtazayev 4'

Stadionul Dr. Constantin Rădulescu, Cluj-Napoca
Attendance: 8,092
Referee: Alexander Harkam (Austria)

CFR Cluj won 3–2 on aggregate.

10 July 2019
20:00

Ferencváros (Hungary)	2–1	(Bulgaria) Ludogorets Razgrad
Nguen 6'; Zubkov 65'	Report	Świerczok 31'

Groupama Arena, Budapest
Attendance: 18,115
Referee: Eitan Shemeulevitch (Israel)
17 July 2019
19:30 (20:30 UTC+3)

Ludogorets Razgrad (Bulgaria)	2–3	(Hungary) Ferencváros
Terziev 24'; Heister 69' (o.g.)	Report	Kharatin 17'; Škvarka 21'; Nguen 48'

Ludogorets Arena, Razgrad
Attendance: 7,365
Referee: Donatas Rumšas (Lithuania)

Ferencváros won 5–3 on aggregate.

10 July 2019
17:30

Partizani (Albania)	0–0	(Azerbaijan) Qarabağ
	Report

Selman Stërmasi Stadium, Tirana
Attendance: 2,120
Referee: Þorvaldur Árnason (Iceland)
17 July 2019
19:00 (21:00 UTC+4)

Qarabağ (Azerbaijan)	2–0	(Albania) Partizani
Ozobić 51'; Quintana 90+4'	Report

Dalga Arena, Baku (Note: Qarabağ play their first and second qualifying rounds home matches at Dalga Arena, Baku, and third qualifying round home match at Tofiq Bahramov Republican Stadium, Baku, instead of their regular stadium Azersun Arena, Baku.)
Attendance: 5,932
Referee: Dumitru Muntean (Moldova)

Qarabağ won 2–0 on aggregate.

10 July 2019
20:15

Slovan Bratislava (Slovakia)	1–1	(Montenegro) Sutjeska
Šporar 82'	Report	Kojašević 90+5'

Tehelné pole, Bratislava
Attendance: 11,250
Referee: Vitali Meshkov (Russia)
17 July 2019
20:15

Sutjeska (Montenegro)	1–1 (a.e.t.)	(Slovakia) Slovan Bratislava
Šofranac 90+3'	Report	Nedić 49' (o.g.)
Penalties
Nikolić (penalty scored); Kojašević (penalty missed); Vlaisavljević (penalty scored); Bubanja (penalty scored); Bulatović (penalty missed)	3–2	(penalty missed) Dražić; (penalty missed) Bozhikov; (penalty scored) Rafael Ratão; (penalty scored) Abena; (penalty missed) Šporar

Stadion kraj Bistrice, Nikšić
Attendance: 4,764
Referee: Horațiu Feșnic (Romania)

2–2 on aggregate; Sutjeska won 3–2 on penalties.

9 July 2019
19:45

Sarajevo (Bosnia and Herzegovina)	1–3	(Scotland) Celtic
Oremuš 29'	Report	Johnston 35'; Édouard 51'; Sinclair 85'

Koševo City Stadium, Sarajevo
Attendance: 24,723
Referee: Glenn Nyberg (Sweden)
17 July 2019
20:45 (19:45 UTC+1)

Celtic (Scotland)	2–1	(Bosnia and Herzegovina) Sarajevo
Christie 26'; McGregor 75'	Report	Tatar 62'

Celtic Park, Glasgow
Attendance: 58,662
Referee: Alain Durieux (Luxembourg)

Celtic won 5–2 on aggregate.

10 July 2019
19:00 (20:00 UTC+3)

Sheriff Tiraspol (Moldova)	0–3	(Georgia (country)) Saburtalo Tbilisi
	Report	Rolović 30'; Kokhreidze 67'; Kakubava 71'

Sheriff Stadium, Tiraspol
Attendance: 5,706
Referee: Iwan Arwel Griffith (Wales)
16 July 2019
19:30 (21:30 UTC+4)

Saburtalo Tbilisi (Georgia (country))	1–3	(Moldova) Sheriff Tiraspol
Rolović 59'	Report	Latifi 3'; Margvelashvili 8' (o.g.); Tambe 11'

Mikheil Meskhi Stadium, Tbilisi
Attendance: 7,560
Referee: Pavel Orel (Czech Republic)

Saburtalo Tbilisi won 4–3 on aggregate.

9 July 2019
20:00

F91 Dudelange (Luxembourg)	2–2	(Malta) Valletta
Bettaieb 26'; Stolz 45+2'	Report	Packer 64'; J. Borg 70'

Stade Josy Barthel, Luxembourg City (Note: F91 Dudelange played their home match at Stade Josy Barthel, Luxembourg City, instead of their regular stadium Stade Jos Nosbaum, Dudelange.)
Attendance: 1,152
Referee: Arnold Hunter (Northern Ireland)
16 July 2019
20:00

Valletta (Malta)	1–1	(Luxembourg) F91 Dudelange
Fontanella 35'	Report	Pokar 59'

Centenary Stadium, Ta' Qali
Attendance: 1,512
Referee: Juri Frischer (Estonia)

3–3 on aggregate; Valletta won on away goals.

10 July 2019
20:45 (19:45 UTC+1)

Linfield (Northern Ireland)	0–2	(Norway) Rosenborg
	Report	Jensen 22'; Søderlund 69'

Windsor Park, Belfast
Attendance: 2,710
Referee: Ivaylo Stoyanov (Bulgaria)
17 July 2019
19:00

Rosenborg (Norway)	4–0	(Northern Ireland) Linfield
Konradsen 20', 51'; Akintola 69'; Helland 85'	Report

Lerkendal Stadion, Trondheim
Attendance: 11,904
Referee: Enea Jorgji (Albania)

Rosenborg won 6–0 on aggregate.

10 July 2019
22:00 (20:00 UTC+0)

Valur (Iceland)	0–3	(Slovenia) Maribor
	Report	Peričić 43'; Hotić 60'; Kronaveter 86' (pen.)

Hlíðarendi, Reykjavík
Attendance: 1,201
Referee: Krzysztof Jakubik (Poland)
17 July 2019
20:15

Maribor (Slovenia)	2–0	(Iceland) Valur
Kronaveter 11'; Tavares 32'	Report

Ljudski vrt, Maribor
Attendance: 6,716
Referee: João Pinheiro (Portugal)

Maribor won 5–0 on aggregate.

10 July 2019
20:45 (19:45 UTC+1)

Dundalk (Republic of Ireland)	0–0	(Latvia) Riga
	Report

Oriel Park, Dundalk
Attendance: 3,100
Referee: Peter Kralovič (Slovakia)
17 July 2019
18:30 (19:30 UTC+3)

Riga (Latvia)	0–0 (a.e.t.)	(Republic of Ireland) Dundalk
	Report
Penalties
Debelko (penalty scored); Šarić (penalty scored); Gabovs (penalty scored); Brisola (penalty missed); Panić (penalty missed); Rakels (penalty scored); Pētersons (penalty missed)	4–5	(penalty scored) Hoban; (penalty scored) Murray; (penalty scored) Jarvis; (penalty missed) Massey; (penalty missed) G. Kelly; (penalty scored) McGrath; (penalty scored) Hoare

Skonto Stadium, Riga
Attendance: 6,050
Referee: Dimitar Mečkarovski (North Macedonia)

0–0 on aggregate; Dundalk won 5–4 on penalties.

9 July 2019
20:00 (19:00 UTC+1)

The New Saints (Wales)	2–2	(Kosovo) Feronikeli
Draper 49' (pen.); Edwards 77'	Report	Zeka 89'; Fazliu 90+3' (pen.)

Park Hall, Oswestry
Attendance: 1,140
Referee: Trustin Farrugia Cann (Malta)
16 July 2019
20:45

Feronikeli (Kosovo)	0–1	(Wales) The New Saints
	Report	Ebbe 67'

Fadil Vokrri Stadium, Pristina (Note: Feronikeli played their home match at Fadil Vokrri Stadium, Pristina, instead of their regular stadium Rexhep Rexhepi Stadium, Drenas which did not meet UEFA requirements.)
Attendance: 7,800
Referee: Espen Eskås (Norway)

The New Saints won 3–2 on aggregate.

9 July 2019
18:00 (19:00 UTC+3)

HJK (Finland)	3–0	(Faroe Islands) HB
Lappalainen 21', 66'; O'Shaughnessy 42'	Report

Telia 5G -areena, Helsinki
Attendance: 4,719
Referee: Giorgi Kruashvili (Georgia)
16 July 2019
20:00 (19:00 UTC+1)

HB (Faroe Islands)	2–2	(Finland) HJK
Pingel 17'; Andersen 56'	Report	Riski 60', 77'

Gundadalur, Tórshavn
Attendance: 620
Referee: Georgios Kominis (Greece)

HJK won 5–2 on aggregate.

10 July 2019
19:00 (20:00 UTC+3)

BATE Borisov (Belarus)	1–1	(Poland) Piast Gliwice
Drahun 64'	Report	Parzyszek 36'

Borisov Arena, Barysaw
Attendance: 11,529
Referee: Mete Kalkavan (Turkey)
17 July 2019
20:00

Piast Gliwice (Poland)	1–2	(Belarus) BATE Borisov
Czerwiński 21'	Report	Moukam 82' (pen.); Volkov 87'

Stadion Piast, Gliwice
Attendance: 9,312
Referee: Antti Munukka (Finland)

BATE Borisov won 3–2 on aggregate.

== Second qualifying round ==
The draw for the second qualifying round was held on 19 June 2019, 12:00 CEST.

=== Seeding ===
A total of 24 teams were involved in the second qualifying round draw.

- Champions Path: four teams entering in this round, and the 16 winners of the first qualifying round. They were divided into two groups of ten teams, where five teams were seeded and five teams were unseeded.
- League Path: four teams entering in this round. Two teams were seeded and two teams were unseeded.

Champions Path				League Path	
Group 1		Group 2		League Path	
Seeded	Unseeded	Seeded	Unseeded	Seeded	Unseeded
(Denmark) Copenhagen; (Belarus) BATE Borisov; (Romania) CFR Cluj; (Hungary) Ferencváros; (Azerbaijan) Qarabağ	(Israel) Maccabi Tel Aviv; (Norway) Rosenborg; (Republic of Ireland) Dundalk; (Malta) Valletta; (Wales) The New Saints	(Scotland) Celtic; (Croatia) Dinamo Zagreb; (Cyprus) APOEL; (Slovenia) Maribor; (Serbia) Red Star Belgrade	(Georgia (country)) Saburtalo Tbilisi; (Finland) HJK; (Estonia) Nõmme Kalju; (Montenegro) Sutjeska; (Sweden) AIK	(Switzerland) Basel; (Greece) Olympiacos	(Netherlands) PSV Eindhoven; (Czech Republic) Viktoria Plzeň

Notes

1. ^{†} Winners of the first qualifying round. Teams in italics defeated a team with a higher coefficient, thus effectively taking the coefficient of their opponent in the draw.

=== Summary ===
The first legs were played on 23 and 24 July, and the second legs on 30 and 31 July 2019.

Team 1	Agg.	Team 2	1st leg	2nd leg
Champions Path
CFR Cluj (Romania)	3–2	(Israel) Maccabi Tel Aviv	1–0	2–2
BATE Borisov (Belarus)	2–3	(Norway) Rosenborg	2–1	0–2
The New Saints (Wales)	0–3	(Denmark) Copenhagen	0–2	0–1
Ferencváros (Hungary)	4–2	(Malta) Valletta	3–1	1–1
Dundalk (Republic of Ireland)	1–4	(Azerbaijan) Qarabağ	1–1	0–3
Saburtalo Tbilisi (Georgia (country))	0–5	(Croatia) Dinamo Zagreb	0–2	0–3
Celtic (Scotland)	7–0	(Estonia) Nõmme Kalju	5–0	2–0
Red Star Belgrade (Serbia)	3–2	(Finland) HJK	2–0	1–2
Sutjeska (Montenegro)	0–4	(Cyprus) APOEL	0–1	0–3
Maribor (Slovenia)	4–4 (a)	(Sweden) AIK	2–1	2–3 (a.e.t.)
League Path
Viktoria Plzeň (Czech Republic)	0–4	(Greece) Olympiacos	0–0	0–4
PSV Eindhoven (Netherlands)	4–4 (a)	(Switzerland) Basel	3–2	1–2

=== Champions Path matches ===
24 July 2019
20:00 (21:00 UTC+3)

CFR Cluj (Romania)	1–0	(Israel) Maccabi Tel Aviv
Omrani 22'	Report

Stadionul Dr. Constantin Rădulescu, Cluj-Napoca
Attendance: 11,150
Referee: José María Sánchez Martínez (Spain)
30 July 2019
19:00 (20:00 UTC+3)

Maccabi Tel Aviv (Israel)	2–2	(Romania) CFR Cluj
Blackman 15'; Cohen 48'	Report	Culio 19' (pen.); Rondón 42'

Netanya Stadium, Netanya (Note: Maccabi Tel Aviv played their home match at Netanya Stadium, Netanya, instead of their regular stadium Bloomfield Stadium, Tel Aviv which was undergoing renovation.)
Attendance: 11,947
Referee: Marco Fritz (Germany)

CFR Cluj won 3–2 on aggregate.

24 July 2019
19:00 (20:00 UTC+3)

BATE Borisov (Belarus)	2–1	(Norway) Rosenborg
Stasevich 5' (pen.); Skavysh 51'	Report	Konradsen 25'

Borisov Arena, Barysaw
Attendance: 12,696
Referee: Sandro Schärer (Switzerland)
31 July 2019
19:00

Rosenborg (Norway)	2–0	(Belarus) BATE Borisov
Helland 73' (pen.); Søderlund 85'	Report

Lerkendal Stadion, Trondheim
Attendance: 14,875
Referee: Marco Di Bello (Italy)

Rosenborg won 3–2 on aggregate.

23 July 2019
20:00 (19:00 UTC+1)

The New Saints (Wales)	0–2	(Denmark) Copenhagen
	Report	Sotiriou 18'; Skov 61' (pen.)

Park Hall, Oswestry
Attendance: 1,230
Referee: Alexander Harkam (Austria)
31 July 2019
19:45

Copenhagen (Denmark)	1–0	(Wales) The New Saints
Zeca 52'	Report

Parken Stadium, Copenhagen
Attendance: 12,523
Referee: Karim Abed (France)

Copenhagen won 3–0 on aggregate.

24 July 2019
20:00

Ferencváros (Hungary)	3–1	(Malta) Valletta
Bonello 19' (o.g.); Lanzafame 36' (pen.), 59'	Report	Yuri 85'

Groupama Arena, Budapest
Attendance: 18,603
Referee: Radu Petrescu (Romania)
30 July 2019
20:00

Valletta (Malta)	1–1	(Hungary) Ferencváros
Fontanella 27' (pen.)	Report	Nguen 60'

Centenary Stadium, Ta' Qali
Attendance: 1,108
Referee: Jonathan Lardot (Belgium)

Ferencváros won 4–2 on aggregate.

24 July 2019
20:45 (19:45 UTC+1)

Dundalk (Republic of Ireland)	1–1	(Azerbaijan) Qarabağ
Hoban 78'	Report	Emreli 4'

Oriel Park, Dundalk
Attendance: 3,100
Referee: Bartosz Frankowski (Poland)
31 July 2019
19:00 (21:00 UTC+4)

Qarabağ (Azerbaijan)	3–0	(Republic of Ireland) Dundalk
Jaime Romero 12', 87'; Ailton 76'	Report

Dalga Arena, Baku
Attendance: 5,832
Referee: Svein Oddvar Moen (Norway)

Qarabağ won 4–1 on aggregate.

23 July 2019
19:30 (21:30 UTC+4)

Saburtalo Tbilisi (Georgia (country))	0–2	(Croatia) Dinamo Zagreb
	Report	Oršić 67'; Petković 78' (pen.)

Mikheil Meskhi Stadium, Tbilisi
Attendance: 15,165
Referee: Petr Ardeleanu (Czech Republic)
30 July 2019
20:00

Dinamo Zagreb (Croatia)	3–0	(Georgia (country)) Saburtalo Tbilisi
Oršić 77'; Petković 88'; Dani Olmo 90+4'	Report

Stadion Maksimir, Zagreb
Attendance: 0 (Note: The match was played behind closed doors.)
Referee: Daniele Doveri (Italy)

Dinamo Zagreb won 5–0 on aggregate.

24 July 2019
20:45 (19:45 UTC+1)

Celtic (Scotland)	5–0	(Estonia) Nõmme Kalju
Ajer 36'; Christie 44' (pen.), 65'; Griffiths 45+3'; McGregor 77'	Report

Celtic Park, Glasgow
Attendance: 41,872
Referee: Jakob Kehlet (Denmark)
30 July 2019
19:00 (20:00 UTC+3)

Nõmme Kalju (Estonia)	0–2	(Scotland) Celtic
	Report	Kulinitš 10' (o.g.); Shved 90+3'

Lilleküla Stadium, Tallinn
Attendance: 4,014
Referee: Benoît Millot (France)

Celtic won 7–0 on aggregate.

24 July 2019
20:45

Red Star Belgrade (Serbia)	2–0	(Finland) HJK
Boakye 27'; Pavkov 90'	Report

Red Star Stadium, Belgrade
Attendance: 36,289
Referee: Paweł Gil (Poland)
31 July 2019
18:00 (19:00 UTC+3)

HJK (Finland)	2–1	(Serbia) Red Star Belgrade
Dahlström 46'; Riski 90+2'	Report	Jovančić 56'

Telia 5G -areena, Helsinki
Attendance: 9,107
Referee: Alain Bieri (Switzerland)

Red Star Belgrade won 3–2 on aggregate.

23 July 2019
20:15

Sutjeska (Montenegro)	0–1	(Cyprus) APOEL
	Report	De Vincenti 42' (pen.)

Stadion kraj Bistrice, Nikšić
Attendance: 5,500
Referee: István Vad (Hungary)
30 July 2019
19:00 (20:00 UTC+3)

APOEL (Cyprus)	3–0	(Montenegro) Sutjeska
Pavlović 13', 25', 66'	Report

GSP Stadium, Nicosia
Attendance: 8,297
Referee: Roi Reinshreiber (Israel)

APOEL won 4–0 on aggregate.

24 July 2019
20:15

Maribor (Slovenia)	2–1	(Sweden) AIK
Kronaveter 6'; Ivković 38'	Report	Goitom 28'

Ljudski vrt, Maribor
Attendance: 7,816
Referee: Sascha Stegemann (Germany)
31 July 2019
19:00

AIK (Sweden)	3–2 (a.e.t.)	(Slovenia) Maribor
Karlsson 4'; Larsson 61'; Elyounoussi 93'	Report	Kotnik 48'; Crețu 117'

Friends Arena, Solna
Attendance: 19,179
Referee: Adrien Jaccottet (Switzerland)

4–4 on aggregate; Maribor won on away goals.

=== League Path matches ===
23 July 2019
19:00

Viktoria Plzeň (Czech Republic)	0–0	(Greece) Olympiacos
	Report

Doosan Arena, Plzeň
Attendance: 10,632
Referee: Marco Guida (Italy)
30 July 2019
20:30 (21:30 UTC+3)

Olympiacos (Greece)	4–0	(Czech Republic) Viktoria Plzeň
Guilherme 51', 73'; Guerrero 70'; Semedo 82'	Report

Karaiskakis Stadium, Piraeus
Attendance: 30,123
Referee: Juan Martínez Munuera (Spain)

Olympiacos won 4–0 on aggregate.

23 July 2019
20:00

PSV Eindhoven (Netherlands)	3–2	(Switzerland) Basel
Bruma 14'; Lammers 89'; Malen 90+2'	Report	Ajeti 45+1'; Alderete 79'

Philips Stadion, Eindhoven
Attendance: 31,000
Referee: Andris Treimanis (Latvia)
30 July 2019
20:00

Basel (Switzerland)	2–1	(Netherlands) PSV Eindhoven
Cömert 8'; Van Wolfswinkel 68'	Report	Bruma 23'

St. Jakob-Park, Basel
Attendance: 29,216
Referee: Fábio Veríssimo (Portugal)

4–4 on aggregate; Basel won on away goals.

== Third qualifying round ==
The draw for the third qualifying round was held on 22 July 2019, 12:00 CEST.

=== Seeding ===
A total of 20 teams were involved in the third qualifying round draw.

- Champions Path: two teams entering in this round, and the 10 winners of the second qualifying round Champions Path. Six teams were seeded and six teams were unseeded.
- League Path: six teams entering in this round, and the two winners of the second qualifying round League Path. Four teams were seeded and four teams were unseeded. Teams from Ukraine and Russia could not be drawn into the same tie, and if such a pairing was drawn or was set to be drawn in the final tie, the second team drawn in the current tie would be moved to the next tie.

Champions Path		League Path	
Seeded	Unseeded	Seeded	Unseeded
(Netherlands) Ajax; (Scotland) Celtic; (Denmark) Copenhagen; (Croatia) Dinamo Zagreb; (Norway) Rosenborg; (Cyprus) APOEL	(Greece) PAOK; (Azerbaijan) Qarabağ; (Slovenia) Maribor; (Serbia) Red Star Belgrade; (Romania) CFR Cluj; (Hungary) Ferencváros	(Portugal) Porto; (Ukraine) Dynamo Kyiv; (Switzerland) Basel; (Greece) Olympiacos	(Belgium) Club Brugge; (Russia) Krasnodar; (Turkey) İstanbul Başakşehir; (Austria) LASK

Notes

1. ^{†} Winners of the second qualifying round. Teams in italics defeated a team with a higher coefficient, thus effectively taking the coefficient of their opponent in the draw.

=== Summary ===
The first legs were played on 6 and 7 August, and the second legs on 13 August 2019.

Team 1	Agg.	Team 2	1st leg	2nd leg
Champions Path
CFR Cluj (Romania)	5–4	(Scotland) Celtic	1–1	4–3
APOEL (Cyprus)	3–2	(Azerbaijan) Qarabağ	1–2	2–0
PAOK (Greece)	4–5	(Netherlands) Ajax	2–2	2–3
Dinamo Zagreb (Croatia)	5–1	(Hungary) Ferencváros	1–1	4–0
Red Star Belgrade (Serbia)	2–2 (7–6 p)	(Denmark) Copenhagen	1–1	1–1 (a.e.t.)
Maribor (Slovenia)	2–6	(Norway) Rosenborg	1–3	1–3
League Path
İstanbul Başakşehir (Turkey)	0–3	(Greece) Olympiacos	0–1	0–2
Krasnodar (Russia)	3–3 (a)	(Portugal) Porto	0–1	3–2
Club Brugge (Belgium)	4–3	(Ukraine) Dynamo Kyiv	1–0	3–3
Basel (Switzerland)	2–5	(Austria) LASK	1–2	1–3

=== Champions Path matches ===
7 August 2019
20:00 (21:00 UTC+3)

CFR Cluj (Romania)	1–1	(Scotland) Celtic
Rondón 28'	Report	Forrest 37'

Stadionul Dr. Constantin Rădulescu, Cluj-Napoca
Attendance: 13,055
Referee: Srđan Jovanović (Serbia)
13 August 2019
20:45 (19:45 UTC+1)

Celtic (Scotland)	3–4	(Romania) CFR Cluj
Forrest 51'; Édouard 61'; Christie 76'	Report	Deac 27'; Omrani 74' (pen.), 80'; Țucudean 90+7'

Celtic Park, Glasgow
Attendance: 50,964
Referee: Andris Treimanis (Latvia)

CFR Cluj won 5–4 on aggregate.

6 August 2019
19:00 (20:00 UTC+3)

APOEL (Cyprus)	1–2	(Azerbaijan) Qarabağ
Merkis 90+5'	Report	Emreli 54'; Gueye 69'

GSP Stadium, Nicosia
Attendance: 9,481
Referee: Davide Massa (Italy)
13 August 2019
18:30 (20:30 UTC+4)

Qarabağ (Azerbaijan)	0–2	(Cyprus) APOEL
	Report	De Vincenti 34' (pen.); Matić 68'

Tofiq Bahramov Republican Stadium, Baku
Attendance: 31,531
Referee: Daniel Siebert (Germany)

APOEL won 3–2 on aggregate.

6 August 2019
19:00 (20:00 UTC+3)

PAOK (Greece)	2–2	(Netherlands) Ajax
Akpom 32'; Matos 39'	Report	Ziyech 10'; Huntelaar 57'

Toumba Stadium, Thessaloniki
Attendance: 23,418
Referee: Slavko Vinčić (Slovenia)
13 August 2019
20:30

Ajax (Netherlands)	3–2	(Greece) PAOK
Tadić 43' (pen.), 85' (pen.); Tagliafico 79'	Report	Biseswar 23', 90+4'

Johan Cruyff Arena, Amsterdam
Attendance: 53,942
Referee: Craig Pawson (England)

Ajax won 5–4 on aggregate.

6 August 2019
20:00

Dinamo Zagreb (Croatia)	1–1	(Hungary) Ferencváros
Olmo 7'	Report	Sigér 59'

Stadion Maksimir, Zagreb
Attendance: 14,283
Referee: Paweł Raczkowski (Poland)
13 August 2019
20:00

Ferencváros (Hungary)	0–4	(Croatia) Dinamo Zagreb
	Report	Ademi 16'; Petković 47'; Olmo 55'; Gojak 79'

Groupama Arena, Budapest
Attendance: 20,321
Referee: Ruddy Buquet (France)

Dinamo Zagreb won 5–1 on aggregate.

6 August 2019
20:45

Red Star Belgrade (Serbia)	1–1	(Denmark) Copenhagen
Pavkov 44'	Report	Wind 84' (pen.)

Red Star Stadium, Belgrade
Attendance: 40,812
Referee: Tiago Martins (Portugal)
13 August 2019
20:00

Copenhagen (Denmark)	1–1 (a.e.t.)	(Serbia) Red Star Belgrade
N'Doye 45'	Report	Boakye 17'
Penalties
Wind (penalty scored); Fischer (penalty missed); Sotiriou (penalty scored); Bengtsson (penalty missed); Zeca (penalty scored); N'Doye (penalty missed); Bartolec (penalty missed); Nelsson (penalty scored); Papagiannopoulos (penalty scored); Grytebust (penalty scored); Wind (penalty missed)	6–7	(penalty missed) Marin; (penalty scored) Ivanić; (penalty missed) Jevtović; (penalty scored) Jander; (penalty scored) Pankov; (penalty missed) Jovančić; (penalty missed) Simić; (penalty scored) Degenek; (penalty scored) Gobeljić; (penalty scored) Borjan; (penalty scored) Pankov

Parken Stadium, Copenhagen
Attendance: 29,872
Referee: Gediminas Mažeika (Lithuania)

2–2 on aggregate; Red Star Belgrade won 7–6 on penalties.

7 August 2019
20:15

Maribor (Slovenia)	1–3	(Norway) Rosenborg
Tavares 70'	Report	Søderlund 50', 64'; Jensen 71'

Ljudski vrt, Maribor
Attendance: 10,316
Referee: François Letexier (France)
13 August 2019
19:00

Rosenborg (Norway)	3–1	(Slovenia) Maribor
Søderlund 53'; Konradsen 61', 81'	Report	Požeg Vancaš 45+2'

Lerkendal Stadion, Trondheim
Attendance: 18,564
Referee: Serdar Gözübüyük (Netherlands)

Rosenborg won 6–2 on aggregate.

=== League Path matches ===
7 August 2019
19:45 (20:45 UTC+3)

İstanbul Başakşehir (Turkey)	0–1	(Greece) Olympiacos
	Report	Gio. Masouras 53'

Başakşehir Fatih Terim Stadium, Istanbul
Attendance: 4,301
Referee: Orel Grinfeld (Israel)
13 August 2019
20:30 (21:30 UTC+3)

Olympiacos (Greece)	2–0	(Turkey) İstanbul Başakşehir
Semedo 55'; Valbuena 78' (pen.)	Report

Karaiskakis Stadium, Piraeus
Attendance: 28,521
Referee: Bobby Madden (Scotland)

Olympiacos won 3–0 on aggregate.

7 August 2019
19:00 (20:00 UTC+3)

Krasnodar (Russia)	0–1	(Portugal) Porto
	Report	Sérgio Oliveira 89'

Krasnodar Stadium, Krasnodar
Attendance: 34,874
Referee: Tobias Stieler (Germany)
13 August 2019
21:00 (20:00 UTC+1)

Porto (Portugal)	2–3	(Russia) Krasnodar
Zé Luís 57'; Luis Díaz 76'	Report	Vilhena 3'; Suleymanov 13', 34'

Estádio do Dragão, Porto
Attendance: 48,520
Referee: Marco Guida (Italy)

3–3 on aggregate; Krasnodar won on away goals.

6 August 2019
20:30

Club Brugge (Belgium)	1–0	(Ukraine) Dynamo Kyiv
Vanaken 37' (pen.)	Report

Jan Breydel Stadium, Bruges
Attendance: 27,018
Referee: Xavier Estrada Fernández (Spain)
13 August 2019
19:30 (20:30 UTC+3)

Dynamo Kyiv (Ukraine)	3–3	(Belgium) Club Brugge
Buyalskyi 6'; Shepelyev 50'; Mechele 90+3' (o.g.)	Report	Deli 38'; Vormer 88'; Openda 90+5'

NSC Olimpiyskiy, Kyiv
Attendance: 42,152
Referee: Ivan Bebek (Croatia)

Club Brugge won 4–3 on aggregate.

7 August 2019
20:00

Basel (Switzerland)	1–2	(Austria) LASK
Zuffi 87'	Report	Trauner 51'; Klauss 82'

St. Jakob-Park, Basel
Attendance: 20,470
Referee: Andreas Ekberg (Sweden)
13 August 2019
20:30

LASK (Austria)	3–1	(Switzerland) Basel
Ranftl 59'; Goiginger 89'; Raguž 90+4'	Report	Ademi 80'

Linzer Stadion, Linz
Attendance: 12,966
Referee: Aliyar Aghayev (Azerbaijan)

LASK won 5–2 on aggregate.

== Play-off round ==
The draw for the play-off round was held on 5 August 2019, 12:00 CEST.

=== Seeding ===
A total of 12 teams were involved in the play-off round draw.

- Champions Path: two teams entering in this round, and the six winners of the third qualifying round Champions Path. Four teams were seeded and four teams were unseeded.
- League Path: the four winners of the third qualifying round League Path. Two teams were seeded and two teams were unseeded.

Champions Path		League Path	
Seeded	Unseeded	Seeded	Unseeded
(Netherlands) Ajax; (Romania) CFR Cluj; (Serbia) Red Star Belgrade; (Croatia) Dinamo Zagreb	(Switzerland) Young Boys; (Cyprus) APOEL; (Czech Republic) Slavia Prague; (Norway) Rosenborg	(Russia) Krasnodar; (Belgium) Club Brugge	(Austria) LASK; (Greece) Olympiacos

Notes

1. ^{†} Winners of the third qualifying round. Teams in italics defeated a team with a higher coefficient, thus effectively taking the coefficient of their opponent in the draw.

=== Summary ===
The first legs were played on 20 and 21 August, and the second legs on 27 and 28 August 2019.

Team 1	Agg.	Team 2	1st leg	2nd leg
Champions Path
Dinamo Zagreb (Croatia)	3–1	(Norway) Rosenborg	2–0	1–1
CFR Cluj (Romania)	0–2	(Czech Republic) Slavia Prague	0–1	0–1
Young Boys (Switzerland)	3–3 (a)	(Serbia) Red Star Belgrade	2–2	1–1
APOEL (Cyprus)	0–2	(Netherlands) Ajax	0–0	0–2
League Path
LASK (Austria)	1–3	(Belgium) Club Brugge	0–1	1–2
Olympiacos (Greece)	6–1	(Russia) Krasnodar	4–0	2–1

=== Champions Path matches ===
21 August 2019
21:00

Dinamo Zagreb (Croatia)	2–0	(Norway) Rosenborg
Petković 8' (pen.); Oršić 28'	Report

Stadion Maksimir, Zagreb
Attendance: 23,859
Referee: Daniele Orsato (Italy)
27 August 2019
21:00

Rosenborg (Norway)	1–1	(Croatia) Dinamo Zagreb
David 11'	Report	Gojak 71'

Lerkendal Stadion, Trondheim
Attendance: 18,173
Referee: Ovidiu Hațegan (Romania)

Dinamo Zagreb won 3–1 on aggregate.

20 August 2019
21:00 (22:00 UTC+3)

CFR Cluj (Romania)	0–1	(Czech Republic) Slavia Prague
	Report	Masopust 28'

Stadionul Dr. Constantin Rădulescu, Cluj-Napoca
Attendance: 15,196
Referee: Cüneyt Çakır (Turkey)
28 August 2019
21:00

Slavia Prague (Czech Republic)	1–0	(Romania) CFR Cluj
Bořil 66'	Report

Sinobo Stadium, Prague
Attendance: 18,562
Referee: Gianluca Rocchi (Italy)

Slavia Prague won 2–0 on aggregate.

21 August 2019
21:00

Young Boys (Switzerland)	2–2	(Serbia) Red Star Belgrade
Assalé 7'; Hoarau 76' (pen.)	Report	Degenek 18'; García 46'

Stade de Suisse, Bern
Attendance: 26,375
Referee: Danny Makkelie (Netherlands)
27 August 2019
21:00

Red Star Belgrade (Serbia)	1–1	(Switzerland) Young Boys
Vukanović 59'	Report	Ben 82' (o.g.)

Red Star Stadium, Belgrade
Attendance: 47,487
Referee: Anthony Taylor (England)

3–3 on aggregate; Red Star Belgrade won on away goals.

20 August 2019
21:00 (22:00 UTC+3)

APOEL (Cyprus)	0–0	(Netherlands) Ajax
	Report

GSP Stadium, Nicosia
Attendance: 14,549
Referee: Antonio Mateu Lahoz (Spain)
28 August 2019
21:00

Ajax (Netherlands)	2–0	(Cyprus) APOEL
Álvarez 43'; Tadić 80'	Report

Johan Cruyff Arena, Amsterdam
Attendance: 51,645
Referee: Felix Zwayer (Germany)

Ajax won 2–0 on aggregate.

=== League Path matches ===
20 August 2019
21:00

LASK (Austria)	0–1	(Belgium) Club Brugge
	Report	Vanaken 10' (pen.)

Linzer Stadion, Linz
Attendance: 12,637
Referee: Szymon Marciniak (Poland)
28 August 2019
21:00

Club Brugge (Belgium)	2–1	(Austria) LASK
Vanaken 70'; Dennis 89'	Report	Klauss 74' (pen.)

Jan Breydel Stadium, Bruges
Attendance: 25,319
Referee: Felix Brych (Germany)

Club Brugge won 3–1 on aggregate.

21 August 2019
21:00 (22:00 UTC+3)

Olympiacos (Greece)	4–0	(Russia) Krasnodar
Guerrero 30'; Ranđelović 78', 85'; Podence 89'	Report

Karaiskakis Stadium, Piraeus
Attendance: 29,132
Referee: Carlos del Cerro Grande (Spain)
27 August 2019
21:00 (22:00 UTC+3)

Krasnodar (Russia)	1–2	(Greece) Olympiacos
Utkin 10'	Report	El-Arabi 11', 48'

Krasnodar Stadium, Krasnodar
Attendance: 34,627
Referee: Damir Skomina (Slovenia)

Olympiacos won 6–1 on aggregate.

== Top goalscorers ==
There were 240 goals scored in 91 matches in the qualifying phase and play-off round, for an average of 2.64 goals per match.

Rank	Player	Team	Goals
1	(France) Billel Omrani	(Romania) CFR Cluj	6
2	(Norway) Alexander Søderlund	(Norway) Rosenborg	5
2	(Norway) Anders Konradsen	(Norway) Rosenborg	5
4	(Scotland) Ryan Christie	(Scotland) Celtic	4
4	(Croatia) Bruno Petković	(Croatia) Dinamo Zagreb	4
6	(Norway) Tokmac Nguen	(Hungary) Ferencváros	3
6	(Slovenia) Rok Kronaveter	(Slovenia) Maribor	3
6	(Ghana) Richmond Boakye	(Serbia) Red Star Belgrade	3
6	(Finland) Riku Riski	(Finland) HJK	3
6	(Eritrea) Henok Goitom	(Sweden) AIK	3
6	(Serbia) Andrija Pavlović	(Cyprus) APOEL	3
6	(Croatia) Mislav Oršić	(Croatia) Dinamo Zagreb	3
6	(Spain) Dani Olmo	(Croatia) Dinamo Zagreb	3
6	(Serbia) Dušan Tadić	(Netherlands) Ajax	3
