= Tomané =

Portuguese association footballer

Personal information
- Full name: António Manuel Fernandes Mendes
- Date of birth: 23 October 1992 (age 34)
- Place of birth: Fafe, Portugal
- Height: 1.82 m (6 ft 0 in)
- Position: Forward

Team information
- Current team: Tondela
- Number: 19

Youth career
- 2003–2005: Boavista
- 2006–2011: Vitória Guimarães

Senior career*
Years	Team	Apps	(Gls)
2010–2016	Vitória Guimarães	70	(9)
2012–2014	Vitória Guimarães B	46	(7)
2011–2012	→ Limianos (loan)	18	(1)
2016	→ MSV Duisburg (loan)	9	(0)
2016	Panetolikos	11	(1)
2017	Arouca	17	(3)
2017–2019	Tondela	63	(21)
2019–2020	Red Star	22	(6)
2020–2023	Samsunspor	47	(12)
2023–2024	APOEL	25	(3)
2024–2025	Farense	24	(3)
2025–2026	AVS	29	(4)
2026–	Tondela	3	(0)

International career
2009–2010	Portugal U18	7	(0)
2010	Portugal U19	2	(2)
2012–2014	Portugal U21	4	(0)
- * Club domestic league appearances and goals as of 03:31, 27 August 2026 (UTC)

António Manuel Fernandes Mendes (born 23 October 1992), known as Tomané, is a Portuguese professional footballer who plays as a forward for Liga Portugal 2 club Tondela.

== Club career ==
=== Vitória Guimarães ===
Tomané was born in Fafe, Braga District. On 16 August 2010, while still a junior at Vitória de Guimarães (he arrived at the club's youth system at the age of 13), he made his professional – and Primeira Liga – debut, taking the pitch in the 67th minute of a 0–0 away draw against S.C. Olhanense; it would be his only appearance of the season.

For the 2011–12 campaign, Tomané was loaned to A.D. Os Limianos in the third division. After returning, he alternated between the first team and the reserves, never scoring more than four league goals for the former during his spell.

On 27 January 2016, Tomané signed a five-month loan with MSV Duisburg. His first match in the 2. Bundesliga occurred on 8 February, as he played 85 minutes in a 2–1 loss at Arminia Bielefeld.

=== Panetolikos ===
On 15 June 2016, Tomané joined Super League Greece club Panetolikos F.C. on a three-year contract. He scored his only goal for them on 15 October, helping the hosts to defeat PAE Kerkyra 4–0 by netting shortly after kick-off.

=== Return to Portugal ===
Tomané returned to his country and its top division on 30 December 2016, agreeing to a deal at F.C. Arouca until June 2019. In the ensuing off-season, however, following his team's relegation, he moved to C.D. Tondela.

As his side avoided relegation in the last matchday of the 2018–19 season, Tomané helped with a career-best 12 goals (14 in all competitions).

=== Red Star ===
On 2 July 2019, Tomané signed for Serbian club Red Star Belgrade. He scored five times in his debut campaign to win the SuperLiga, his first goal coming on 17 August in a 3–2 away win over FK Spartak Subotica.

=== Later career ===
Tomané changed teams and countries again in summer 2020, on a three-year contract at Samsunspor of the Turkish TFF First League. He won promotion to the Süper Lig in 2022–23, but featured sparingly in the process; he dealt with several injury problems during his tenure.

On 28 June 2023, Tomané signed for APOEL FC.

== International career ==
Tomané earned four caps for the Portugal under-21 team in slightly less than two years. His first arrived on 15 October 2012, as he played the full 90 minutes in a 1–0 friendly home loss to Ukraine.

== Career statistics ==
As of end of 2023–24 season

Appearances and goals by club, season and competition
Club	Season	League			National cup		League cup		Other		Total	
Club	Season	Division	Apps	Goals	Apps	Goals	Apps	Goals	Apps	Goals	Apps	Goals
Vitória Guimarães	2010–11	Primeira Liga	1	0	0	0	—		—		1	0
Vitória Guimarães	2013–14	Primeira Liga	21	4	2	0	1	1	5	1	29	6
Vitória Guimarães	2014–15	Primeira Liga	32	4	2	0	1	0	—		35	4
Vitória Guimarães	2015–16	Primeira Liga	16	1	1	0	1	0	2	1	20	2
Vitória Guimarães	Total		70	9	5	0	3	1	7	2	85	12
Vitória Guimarães B	2012–13	Segunda Liga	36	4	—						36	4
Vitória Guimarães B	2013–14	Campeonato Nacional	10	3	—						10	3
Vitória Guimarães B	Total		46	7	0	0	0	0	0	0	46	7
Limianos (loan)	2011–12	Segunda Divisão	18	1	0	0	—		—		18	1
MSV Duisburg (loan)	2015–16	2. Bundesliga	9	0	0	0	—		—		9	0
Panetolikos	2016–17	Super League Greece	11	1	2	0	—		—		13	1
Arouca	2016–17	Primeira Liga	17	3	0	0	—		—		17	3
Tondela	2017–18	Primeira Liga	32	9	1	0	—		—		33	9
Tondela	2018–19	Primeira Liga	31	12	3	2	2	0	—		36	14
Tondela	Total		63	21	4	2	2	0	—		69	23
Red Star	2019–20	Serbian SuperLiga	18	5	3	1	—		5 (Note: Appearances in UEFA Champions League)	0	26	6
Red Star	2020–21	Serbian SuperLiga	4	1	0	0	—		2	1	6	2
Red Star	Total		22	6	3	1	—		7	1	32	8
Samsunspor	2020–21	TFF First League	5	1	0	0	—		—		5	1
Samsunspor	2021–22	TFF First League	34	10	0	0	—		—		34	10
Samsunspor	2022–23	TFF First League	8	1	0	0	—		—		8	1
Samsunspor	Total		47	12	0	0	—		—		47	12
APOEL	2023–24	Cypriot First Division	25	3	0	0	6	0	—		31	3
Career total			328	63	14	3	11	1	14	3	367	70

== Honours ==
Red Star

- Serbian SuperLiga: 2019–20, 2020–21

Samsunspor

- TFF First League: 2022–23

APOEL

- Cypriot First Division: 2023–24
