= Miloš Vulić =

Serbian association footballer

Personal information
- Date of birth: 19 August 1996 (age 30)
- Place of birth: Kruševac, FR Yugoslavia
- Height: 1.83 m (6 ft 0 in)
- Position: Midfielder

Team information
- Current team: Dong Nai City
- Number: 7

Youth career
- Napredak Kruševac

Senior career*
Years	Team	Apps	(Gls)
2013–2018	Napredak Kruševac	114	(13)
2019–2020	Red Star Belgrade	40	(6)
2020–2022	Crotone	47	(2)
2022–2023	Perugia	9	(0)
2023–2025	TSC	48	(6)
2025–2026	Napredak Kruševac	30	(4)
2026–	Dong Nai City	1	(0)

International career^{‡}
2021	Serbia	2	(0)
- * Club domestic league appearances and goals as of 5 September 2026 ‡ National team caps and goals as of 11:37, 11 June 2021 (UTC)

Miloš Vulić (Serbian Cyrillic: Милош Вулић; born 19 August 1996) is a Serbian professional footballer who plays as a midfielder for V.League 1 club Dong Nai City.

== Club career ==
=== Napredak ===
Vulić began playing football in his hometown, with the youth system of Napredak Kruševac before debuting for them professionally. On 5 May 2018, he made an assist and scored a goal in a 2-2 tie with Partizan. Over the course of the 2017–18 season, he scored a total of five goals in 30 games played and was also the team's captain.

=== Red Star Belgrade ===
Vulić signed a three-year contract with Red Star Belgrade on 21 December 2018. On 18 September 2019, he made his UEFA Champions League debut when he came on as a substitute in a 3-0 loss to Bayern Munich.

=== Crotone ===
Vulić signed a three-year contract with Crotone on 5 September 2020.

=== Perugia ===
On 20 July 2022, Vulić moved to Perugia.

=== Dong Nai City ===
In July 2026, Majdevac moved to Vietnam, signing for newly promoted V.League 1 club Dong Nai City.

== International career ==
He made his debut for Serbia national football team on 7 June 2021 in a friendly against Jamaica.

== Career statistics ==
=== Club ===
As of end of 2021–22 season.

Appearances and goals by club, season and competition
Club	Season	League			National Cup		Continental		Total	
Club	Season	Division	Apps	Goals	Apps	Goals	Apps	Goals	Apps	Goals
Napredak	2012–13	Serbian First League	4	0	0	0	—		4	0
Napredak	2013–14	Serbian SuperLiga	1	0	0	0	—		1	0
Napredak	2014–15	Serbian SuperLiga	2	0	0	0	—		2	0
Napredak	2015–16	Serbian First League	28	2	1	0	—		29	2
Napredak	2016–17	Serbian SuperLiga	23	0	1	0	—		24	0
Napredak	2017–18	Serbian SuperLiga	30	5	3	1	—		33	6
Napredak	2018–19	Serbian SuperLiga	19	4	2	1	—		21	5
Napredak	Total		107	11	7	2	—		114	13
Red Star Belgrade	2018–19	Serbian SuperLiga	5	0	3	0	0	0	8	0
Red Star Belgrade	2019–20	Serbian SuperLiga	21	2	2	1	4	1	27	4
Red Star Belgrade	2020–21	Serbian SuperLiga	4	2	0	0	1	0	5	2
Red Star Belgrade	Total		30	4	5	1	5	1	40	6
Crotone	2020–21	Serie A	25	1	1	0	—		26	1
Crotone	2021–22	Serie B	19	0	2	1	—		21	1
Crotone	Total		44	1	3	1	0	0	47	2
Career total			181	16	15	4	5	1	201	21

=== International ===
As of 11 June 2021

Serbia
Year	Apps	Goals
2021	2	0
Total	2	0

== Honours ==
Napredak Kruševac

- Serbian First League: 2012–13, 2015–16

Red Star Belgrade

- Serbian SuperLiga: 2018–19, 2019–20
