= Katarina Grujić =

Serbian pop-folk singer (born 1992)

- Катарина Грујић
- Born: 20 May 1992 (age 34); Belgrade, Serbia, FR Yugoslavia
- Education: Singidunum University
- Spouse: Marko Gobeljić (m. 2021)
- Children: 1
- Musical career
- Genres: Pop-folk
- Occupation: Singer
- Instrument: Vocals
- Years active: 2012–present
- Labels: Grand Production; IDJTunes

Katarina Grujić Gobeljić (Serbian Cyrillic: Катарина Грујић Гобељић; born 20 May 1992) is a Serbian singer. She rose to prominence as a contestant on the singing competition show Zvezde Granda in 2012, finishing in eighth place. Subsequently, Grujić gained popularity with the singles "Jedno đubre obično" (2013) and "Lutka" (2014).

== Personal life ==
After graduating from a private high school, she attended the Faculty of Media and Communications at the Singidunum University.

In August 2021, Grujić married Serbian footballer Marko Gobeljić. She gave birth to their daughter in December the same year.

== Discography ==
Studio albums

- Jača doza mene (2018)
- KGNo2 (2026)

== Filmography ==
Filmography of Katarina Grujić
Year	Title	Genre	Role	Notes
2012–2013	Zvezde Granda	Television	Herself	Season 7, 8th place
2013	Farma	Television	Herself	Season 5, contestant (semi-finalist)
