= Radovan Pankov (footballer) =

Serbian footballer (born 1995)

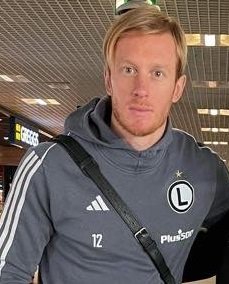
- Pankov with Legia Warsaw in 2023

Personal information
- Full name: Radovan Pankov
- Date of birth: 5 August 1995 (age 31)
- Place of birth: Novi Sad, FR Yugoslavia
- Height: 1.85 m (6 ft 1 in)
- Positions: Centre-back; right-back

Team information
- Current team: Persija Jakarta
- Number: 6

Youth career
- –2014: Vojvodina

Senior career*
Years	Team	Apps	(Gls)
2014–2016	Vojvodina	46	(0)
2016–2018	Ural Yekaterinburg	5	(0)
2017–2018	→ AEK Larnaca (loan)	5	(1)
2018–2019	Radnički Niš	35	(3)
2019–2023	Red Star Belgrade	80	(2)
2023	→ Čukarički (loan)	14	(1)
2023–2026	Legia Warsaw	70	(4)
2023	Legia Warsaw II	1	(0)
2026–	Persija Jakarta	9	(0)

International career
2014	Serbia U19	2	(0)
2015	Serbia U20		
Medal record
Men's football
Representing Serbia
FIFA U-20 World Cup
Winner	2015 New Zealand
- * Club domestic league appearances and goals as of 8 November 2026

Radovan Pankov (Serbian Cyrillic: Радован Панков; born 5 August 1995) is a Serbian professional footballer who plays as a defender for Super League club Persija Jakarta.

== Club career ==
=== Vojvodina ===
As a youth player, Pankov developed under the supervision of Vojvodina youth coach Milan Kosanović. He was a member of one of the most talented generations in Vojvodina's youth ranks, as his teammates at the time included Sergej Milinković-Savić, Mijat Gaćinović, Srđan Babić, Nebojša Kosović, Emil Rockov, and Milan Spremo. He emphasized that Spremo was "by far the greatest talent of that generation".

Pankov made his professional debut for Vojvodina on 10 May 2014 in 1-0 home loss to Jagodina. In the summer of 2015, Pankov participated in Vojvodina's 2015–16 UEFA Europa League qualifying campaign. On 30 July 2015, he played in a historic 0-4 away win against Sampdoria in the first leg of the third qualifying round for the Europa League. In an interview with Mozzart Sport in August 2019, Pankov claimed that the best striker he ever played against was Luis Muriel from the 2015 Europa League duel with Sampdoria. The first leg win against Sampdoria ultimately helped Vojvodina make the play-off against Viktoria Plzeň, after which Vojvodina was eliminated.

=== Ural Sverdlovskaya Oblast ===
On 23 May 2016, Pankov signed a long-term contract with Russian side Ural Sverdlovskaya Oblast. He was the second player from Vojvodina to join Ural that spring, after Dominik Dinga. Shortly after joining Ural, he suffered an adductor injury.

On 30 June 2017, Pankov signed a one-season loan deal with Cypriot side AEK Larnaca.

=== Radnički Niš ===
On 20 June 2018, Pankov signed a three-year contract with Serbian club Radnički Niš. He played as a starter under coach Nenad Lalatović, and Radnički Niš went on to finish second overall in the 2018–19 Serbian SuperLiga. He was named by Zajednica Super lige among the best eleven players in the entire league that season.

=== Red Star Belgrade ===
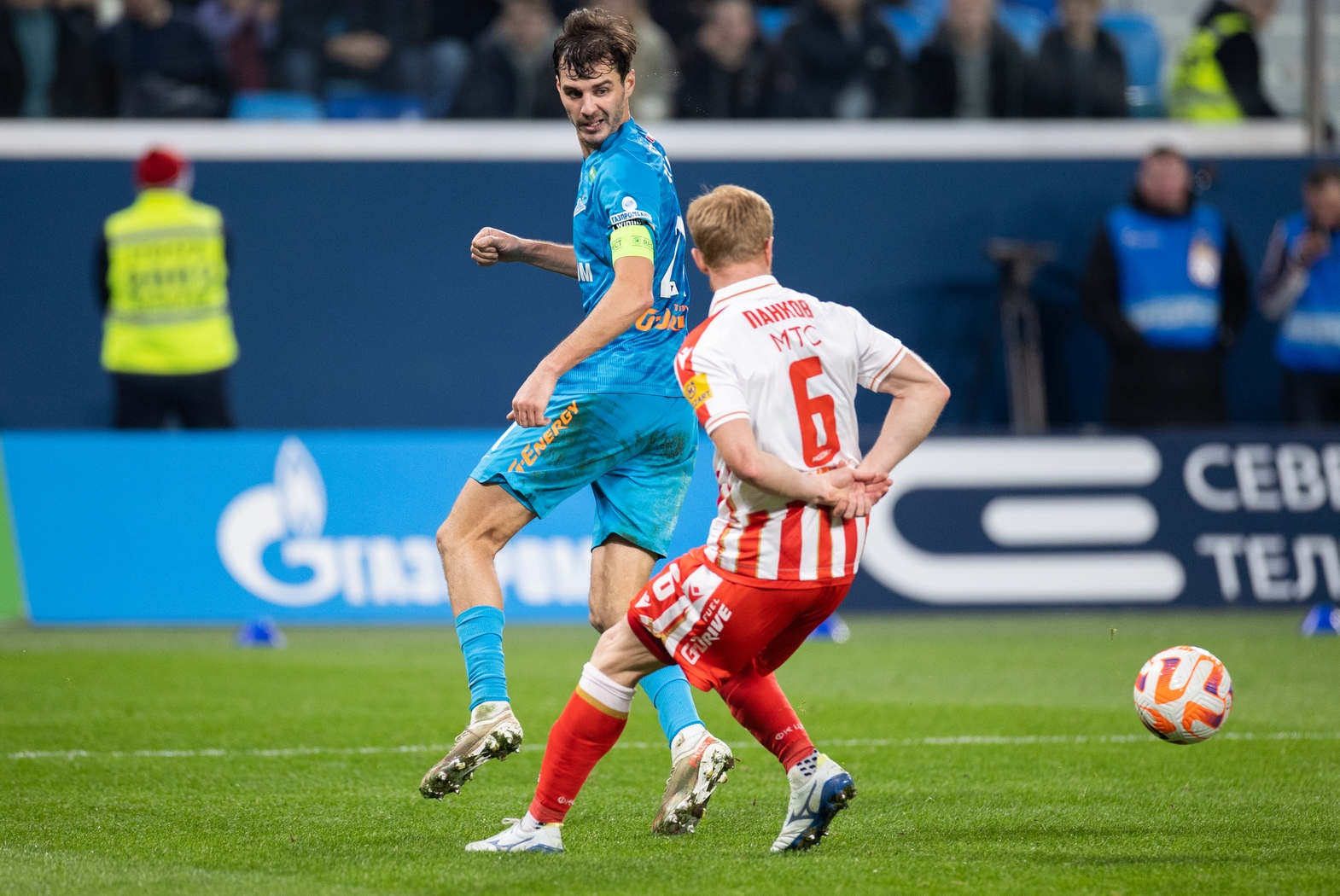
Pankov (number 6) playing for Red Star Belgrade in 2022

On 31 May 2019, Pankov signed a three-year contract with Red Star Belgrade. On 13 August 2019, he played a memorable match in the second leg of the third qualifying round of the 2019–20 UEFA Champions League against Copenhagen. He marked Dame N'Doye throughout the match and scored the winning penalty in a penalty shoot-out after overtime. He spent the second half of the 2022–23 season on loan at Čukarički.

=== Legia Warsaw ===
On 13 June 2023, Pankov signed a three-year contract with Polish Ekstraklasa club Legia Warsaw. On 5 October 2023, Radovan Pankov was arrested by Dutch police alongside teammate Josué Pesqueira after an altercation with security staff following a match against AZ Alkmaar in the group stage of the UEFA Europa Conference League. They were released the following day. On 29 November, a spokesperson of the Dutch Ministry of Justice and Security confirmed that Public Prosecution Service would be prosecuting Pankov for (attempted) serious assault of a member of AZ's security staff. On 15 December 2023, UEFA charged AZ with a €40,000 fine for failing to provide security for the Polish side. However, in June 2025, the Court of Arbitration for Sport (CAS) overturned the decision, ruling that AZ was not responsible for the incidents and had taken all reasonable measures together with the police to ensure a safe match. As a result, the club no longer has to pay the fine.

On 15 August 2024, he contributed significantly to Legia Warsaw's advancement from the third qualifying round to the play-off stage of the UEFA Conference League, as they faced Norwegian club Brøndby. He equalized with a header to make it 1–1, which resulted in an aggregate score of 4–3, thereby ensuring the club's progression in the competition.

On 28 April 2026, Pankov announced he would be leaving Legia at the end of the season.

== International career ==
Pankov was selected by coach Veljko Paunović to Serbia's squad for the 2015 FIFA U-20 World Cup, which Serbia ended up winning.

== Personal life ==
Pankov's mother hailed from Herzegovina. His father, Miloš Pankov, was originally from Tovariševo and played as a playmaker for Proleter Zrenjanin in Yugoslavia's third tier. At one point he was a teammate with Darko Kovačević. He was killed in a car accident when Pankov was 11 years old.

== Career statistics ==
As of match played 23 May 2026

Appearances and goals by club, season and competition
Club	Season	League			National cup (Note: Includes Serbian Cup, Russian Cup, Cypriot Cup, Polish Cup)		Continental		Other		Total	
Club	Season	Division	Apps	Goals	Apps	Goals	Apps	Goals	Apps	Goals	Apps	Goals
Vojvodina	2013–14	Serbian SuperLiga	2	0	—		—		—		2	0
Vojvodina	2014–15	Serbian SuperLiga	14	0	2	0	1 (Note: Appearance(s) in UEFA Europa League)	0	—		17	0
Vojvodina	2015–16	Serbian SuperLiga	30	0	2	0	6	0	—		38	0
Vojvodina	Total		46	0	4	0	7	0	—		57	0
Ural Yekaterinburg	2016–17	Russian Premier League	5	0	1	0	—		—		6	0
AEK Larnaca (loan)	2017–18	Cypriot First Division	5	1	3	0	0	0	—		8	1
Radnički Niš	2018–19	Serbian SuperLiga	35	3	3	0	4	2	—		42	5
Red Star	2019–20	Serbian SuperLiga	23	1	2	0	3 (Note: Appearances in UEFA Champions League)	0	—		28	1
Red Star	2020–21	Serbian SuperLiga	32	1	3	1	9 (Note: One appearance in UEFA Champions League, eight appearances in UEFA Europa League)	0	—		44	2
Red Star	2021–22	Serbian SuperLiga	21	0	4	0	11 (Note: Three appearances in UEFA Champions League, eight appearances in UEFA Europa League)	0	—		36	0
Red Star	2022–23	Serbian SuperLiga	4	0	1	0	2	0	—		7	0
Red Star	Total		80	3	10	1	25	0	—		115	3
Čukarički (loan)	2022–23	Serbian SuperLiga	14	1	3	0	—		—		17	1
Legia Warsaw	2023–24	Ekstraklasa	25	2	0	0	10 (Note: Appearances in UEFA Conference League)	0	0	0	35	2
Legia Warsaw	2024–25	Ekstraklasa	23	1	4	0	13	1	—		40	2
Legia Warsaw	2025–26	Ekstraklasa	22	1	0	0	4 (Note: Two appearances in UEFA Europa League, two appearances in UEFA Conference League)	0	0	0	26	1
Legia Warsaw	Total		70	4	4	0	27	1	0	0	101	5
Career total			255	11	28	1	63	3	0	0	346	15

== Honours ==
AEK Larnaca

- Cypriot Cup: 2017–18

Red Star Belgrade

- Serbian SuperLiga: 2019–20, 2020–21, 2021–22
- Serbian Cup: 2020–21, 2021–22

Legia Warsaw

- Polish Cup: 2024–25

Serbia U20

- FIFA U-20 World Cup: 2015

Individual

- Serbian SuperLiga Team of the Season: 2018–19
