= Marko Konatar =

Serbian association footballer

Personal information
- Date of birth: 25 March 2000 (age 26)
- Place of birth: Belgrade, FR Yugoslavia
- Height: 1.80 m (5 ft 11 in)
- Position: Left-back

Team information
- Current team: Kauno Žalgiris
- Number: 33

Youth career
- –2018: Red Star Belgrade

Senior career*
Years	Team	Apps	(Gls)
2018–2021	Red Star Belgrade	1	(0)
2018–2019	→ Grafičar Beograd (loan)	40	(3)
2020–2021	→ Inđija (loan)	1	(0)
2021	→ Železničar Pančevo (loan)	17	(4)
2021–2026	Železničar Pančevo	122	(2)
2026–	Kauno Žalgiris	3	(0)
- * Club domestic league appearances and goals as of 18 August 2026

Marko Konatar (Serbian Cyrillic: Марко Конатар; born 25 March 2000) is a Serbian professional footballer who plays as a left-back for Toplyga club Kauno Žalgiris.

== Personal life ==
On 22 June 2020, he tested positive for COVID-19.

== Career statistics ==
As of 1 February 2022

Appearances and goals by club, season and competition
Club	Season	League			National cup		Continental		Other		Total	
Club	Season	Division	Apps	Goals	Apps	Goals	Apps	Goals	Apps	Goals	Apps	Goals
Grafičar Beograd (loan)	2018–19	Serbian League Belgrade	21	2	0	0	—		—		21	2
Grafičar Beograd (loan)	2019–20	Serbian First League	19	1	0	0	—		—		19	1
Grafičar Beograd (loan)	Total		40	3	0	0	—		—		40	3
Red Star Belgrade	2019–20	Serbian SuperLiga	1	0	0	0	—		—		1	0
Inđija (loan)	2020–21	Serbian SuperLiga	1	0	0	0	—		—		1	0
Železničar Pančevo (loan)	2020–21	Serbian First League	17	4	0	0	—		—		17	4
Železničar Pančevo	2021–22	Serbian First League	20	0	0	0	—		—		20	0
Železničar Pančevo	Železničar Pančevo total		37	4	0	0	—		—		37	4
Career total			79	7	0	0	—		—		79	7

== Honours ==
Grafičar Beograd

- Serbian League Belgrade: 2018–19

Red Star Belgrade

- Serbian SuperLiga: 2019–20

Kauno Žalgiris

- Toplyga: 2026
- Lithuanian Cup: 2026
