= Jander (footballer) =

Brazilian footballer

Personal information
- Full name: Jander Ribeiro Santana
- Date of birth: 8 July 1988 (age 38)
- Place of birth: Feira de Santana, Brazil
- Height: 1.83 m (6 ft 0 in)
- Position: Left-back

Team information
- Current team: Capital CF
- Number: 8

Youth career
- –2008: União São João

Senior career*
Years	Team	Apps	(Gls)
2008–2010	Marília	5	(0)
2010–2011	Juventude	6	(0)
2011–2014	Olhanense	52	(1)
2014–2015	Gil Vicente	21	(0)
2015–2016	Aves	17	(5)
2016–2017	Moreirense	11	(0)
2017–2018	Apollon Limassol	27	(3)
2018–2019	Pafos	17	(0)
2019–2020	Red Star Belgrade	8	(1)
2021	Inter de Limeira	0	(0)
2021–2022	Xanthi	0	(0)
2022–2023	Frederiquense	8	(2)
2023–2024	Veranópolis	4	(0)
2024–	Capital CF	1	(0)
- * Club domestic league appearances and goals as of 19:34, 11 February 2024 (UTC)

Jander Ribeiro Santana (born 8 July 1988), known simply as Jander, is a Brazilian professional footballer who plays as a left-back for Campeonato Tocatinense club Capital CF.

== Career statistics ==
=== Club ===
As of 7 December 2019

Appearances and goals by club, season and competition
Club	Season	League			National cup		League cup		Continental		Total	
Club	Season	Division	Apps	Goals	Apps	Goals	Apps	Goals	Apps	Goals	Apps	Goals
Olhanense	2011–12	Primeira Liga	7	1	0	0	0	0	–	–	7	1
Olhanense	2012–13	Primeira Liga	24	0	1	0	3	0	–	–	28	0
Olhanense	2013–14	Primeira Liga	21	0	1	0	2	0	–	–	24	0
Olhanense	Total		52	1	2	0	5	0	0	0	59	1
Gil Vicente	2014–15	Primeira Liga	21	0	3	0	2	0	–	–	26	0
Aves	2015–16	LigaPro	17	5	0	0	0	0	–	–	17	5
Moreirense	2016–17	Primeira Liga	11	0	0	0	5	0	–	–	16	0
Apollon Limassol	2017–18	Cypriot First Division	27	3	3	1	1	0	11	2	41	6
Pafos	2018–19	Cypriot First Division	17	0	4	0	–	–	–	–	21	0
Red Star	2019–20	Serbian SuperLiga	8	1	1	0	—		6	0	15	1
Career total			152	10	13	1	13	0	11	2	195	13

== Honours ==
Moreirense

- Taça da Liga: 2016–17

Red Star

- Serbian SuperLiga: 2019–20
