= Stefan Fićović =

Serbian footballer (born 1998)

Personal information
- Date of birth: 31 August 1998 (age 28)
- Place of birth: Kosovska Mitrovica, FR Yugoslavia
- Height: 1.83 m (6 ft 0 in)
- Position: Defensive midfielder

Team information
- Current team: OFK Petrovac
- Number: 18

Senior career*
Years	Team	Apps	(Gls)
2016–2019	Borac Čačak	36	(3)
2017–2018	→ Polet Ljubić (loan)	30	(4)
2019–2020	Red Star Belgrade	0	(0)
2019–2020	→ Grafičar Beograd (loan)	38	(1)
2021–2023	Metalac Gornji Milanovac	73	(6)
2023–2024	Borac Banja Luka	26	(1)
2024–2025	Borac Čačak	25	(2)
2025–	OFK Petrovac	32	(1)
- * Club domestic league appearances and goals as of 17 June 2026

Stefan Fićović (Serbian Cyrillic: Стефан Фићовић pronounced [STEH-fan FEE-cho-vich]; born 31 May 1998) is a Serbian professional footballer who plays as a defensive midfielder for OFK Petrovac.

== Career statistics ==
As of 6 February 2021

Club	Season	League			Cup		Continental		Other		Total	
Club	Season	Division	Apps	Goals	Apps	Goals	Apps	Goals	Apps	Goals	Apps	Goals
Polet Ljubić (loan)	2017–18	Serbian League West	30	4	—		—		—		30	4
Borac Čačak	2018–19	Serbian First League	36	3	2	0	—		—		38	3
Grafičar Beograd (loan)	2019–20	Serbian First League	28	1	0	0	—		—		28	1
Grafičar Beograd (loan)	2020–21	Serbian First League	10	0	1	0	—		—		11	0
Grafičar Beograd (loan)	Total		38	1	1	0	—		—		39	1
Metalac Gornji Milanovac	2020–21	Serbian SuperLiga	0	0	0	0	—		—		0	0
Career total			104	8	3	0	—		—		107	8

== Honours ==
Borac Banja Luka

- Bosnian Premier League: 2023–24
