= Marko Marin =

German footballer (born 1989)

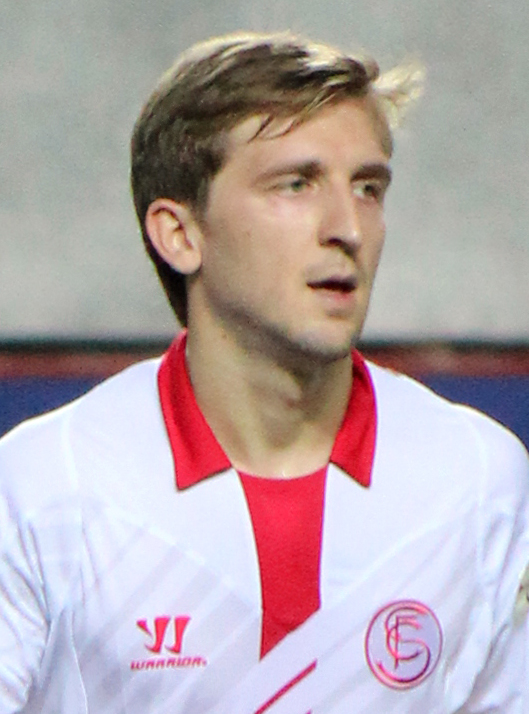
- Marin playing for Sevilla in 2013

Personal information
- Full name: Marko Marin
- Date of birth: 13 March 1989 (age 37)
- Place of birth: Bosanska Gradiška, SR Bosnia and Herzegovina, SFR Yugoslavia
- Height: 1.70 m (5 ft 7 in)
- Positions: Attacking midfielder; winger

Youth career
- –1996: SG 01 Hoechst
- 1996–2005: Eintracht Frankfurt
- 2005–2006: Borussia Mönchengladbach

Senior career*
Years	Team	Apps	(Gls)
2006–2007	Borussia Mönchengladbach II	16	(3)
2007–2009	Borussia Mönchengladbach	68	(8)
2009–2012	Werder Bremen	87	(8)
2012–2016	Chelsea	6	(1)
2013–2014	→ Sevilla (loan)	18	(0)
2014–2015	→ Fiorentina (loan)	0	(0)
2015	→ Anderlecht (loan)	6	(0)
2015–2016	→ Trabzonspor (loan)	24	(2)
2016–2018	Olympiacos	37	(11)
2018–2020	Red Star Belgrade	34	(9)
2020–2021	Al-Ahli	18	(1)
2021	→ Al-Raed (loan)	10	(0)
2021–2022	Ferencváros	17	(2)
Total		341	(45)

International career
2004–2005	Germany U16	9	(0)
2005–2006	Germany U17	16	(5)
2006–2007	Germany U18	4	(2)
2007–2009	Germany U21	12	(1)
2008–2010	Germany	16	(1)
Medal record
Men's football
Representing Germany
FIFA World Cup
Third place	2010 South Africa	Team
UEFA European Under-21 Championship
Winner	2009 Sweden	Team
- * Club domestic league appearances and goals

Marko Marin (German pronunciation: [ˈmaʁko maˈʁiːn]; born 13 March 1989) is a German former professional footballer who played as an attacking midfielder and winger. He was known for his acceleration, dribbling, agility, creativity, versatility, technical skill and playmaking ability. Currently, he is the technical director at Red Star Belgrade.

Marin previously played for Bundesliga clubs Borussia Mönchengladbach and Werder Bremen, before signing for Chelsea in 2012. He spent most of his time out on loan at four clubs in four countries before leaving for Olympiacos in 2016, then Red Star Belgrade in 2018.

A full German international from 2008 to 2010, he won 16 caps and represented the country at the 2010 World Cup, where they came third.

== Early life ==
Marin was born in Bosanska Gradiška, SR Bosnia and Herzegovina, SFR Yugoslavia (modern-day Gradiška, Bosnia and Herzegovina) to Bosnian Serb parents, mother Borka Marin and father Ranko Marin. Marin was only two years old when the family moved to Germany in 1991 due to his mother's job. Growing up in Frankfurt, Marin began playing football with local clubs.

== Club career ==
=== Early career ===
Marin began his footballing career as a youth player, first with SG 01 Hoechst and then with Eintracht Frankfurt.

=== Borussia Mönchengladbach ===
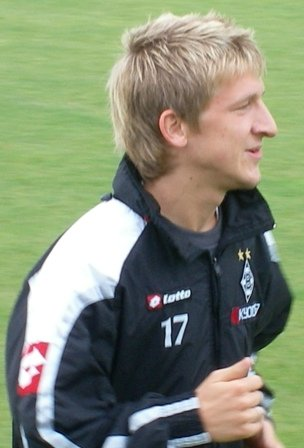
Marin with Borussia Mönchengladbach in 2007

In 2005, Marin moved to the Borussia Mönchengladbach youth academy. After a year at Mönchengladbach's academy, he was promoted to the reserve team; he was offered a three-year contract which he signed and later went on to make his professional début with the club on 31 March 2007 against Eintracht Frankfurt. On 9 August 2008, Marin scored a hat-trick within the first 16 minutes of Mönchengladbach's 8–1 thrashing of seventh division club VfB Fichte Bielefeld in the first round of the DFB-Pokal.

=== Werder Bremen ===
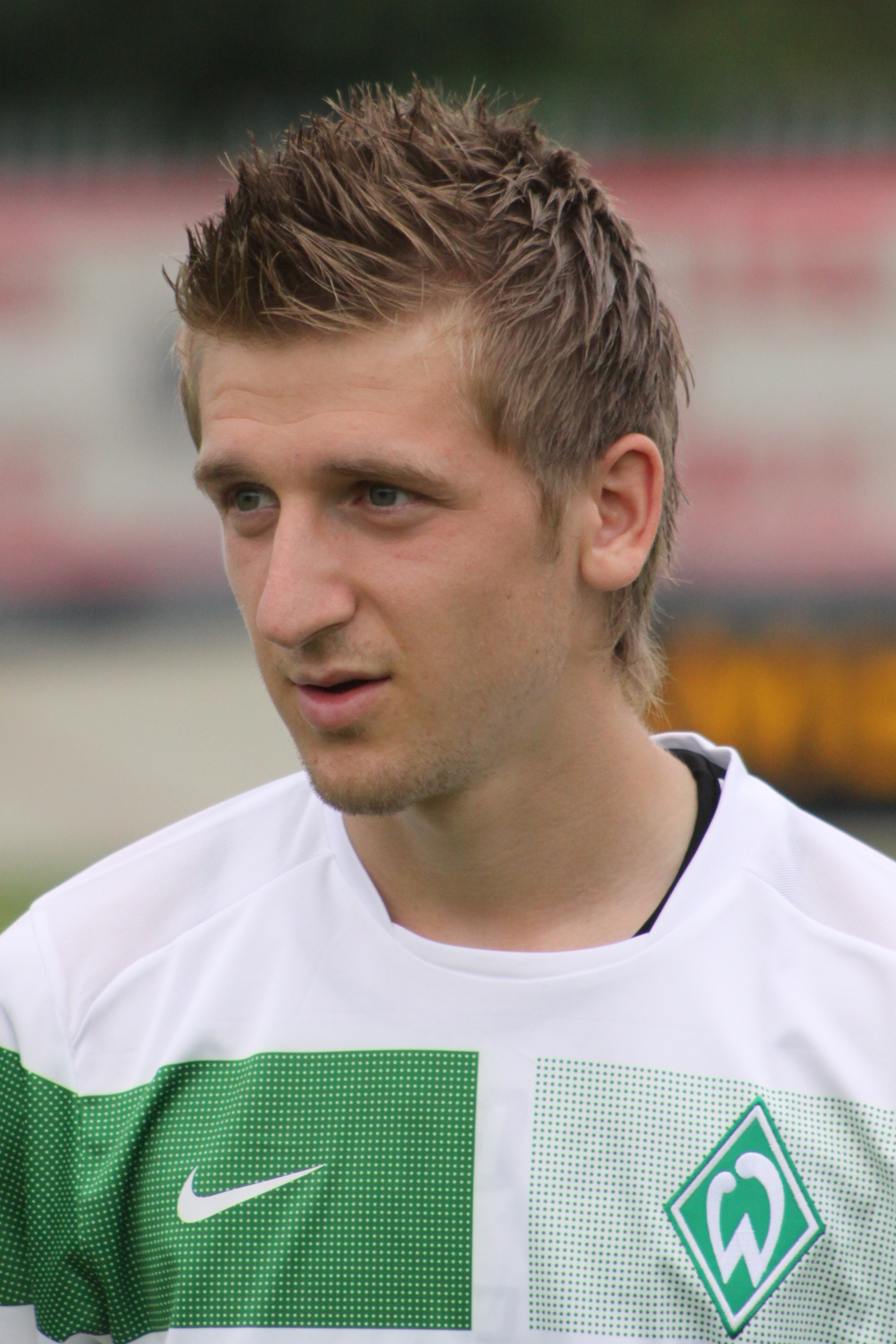
Marin with Werder Bremen in 2009

On 24 June 2009, Marin was sold for €8.2 million from Borussia Mönchengladbach to Werder Bremen. He was a part of Bremen's attack comprising Aaron Hunt and Mesut Özil, which lit up the Weserstadion. In the 2010–11 season, he showed his quality, scoring four league goals and providing 11 assists.

Following the departure of Özil to Real Madrid in August 2010, however, Marin's form dropped noticeably, as he notched only one goal and five assists during Bremen's 2011–12 Bundesliga campaign. Marin did show his skill in Bremen's eight goal game against SC Freiburg on 20 August 2011. He provided assists for Claudio Pizarro, Marko Arnautović and Wesley as Bremen secured a 5–3 win.

Marin's only goal of the Bundesliga campaign came on 18 February 2012, when he opened the scoring in the ninth minute of a 3–1 derby victory over Hamburger SV at the Imtech Arena. In Marin's final game for Bremen, he provided the telling ball for Markus Rosenberg's goal, but this was not enough as his side succumbed to a 4–1 away defeat to VfB Stuttgart on 13 April. Marin ended his time with the Bremen club after scoring eight goals in 87 Bundesliga appearances.

=== Chelsea ===
On 28 April 2012, Marin agreed a deal with English Premier League club Chelsea. He signed a five-year deal with Chelsea, keeping him at the club until 2017. Marko Marin was given the number 21 shirt, previously worn by Salomon Kalou, who left Chelsea for Lille OSC.

==== 2012–13 season ====
On 18 July, Marin made his début for Chelsea in a pre-season friendly against Major League Soccer side Seattle Sounders FC, scoring Chelsea's third goal in a 4–2 win. Marin missed the Community Shield with a hamstring injury.

Marin made his competitive debut for Chelsea in a League Cup match against Wolverhampton Wanderers on 25 September, coming on as a substitute as Chelsea cruised to a 6–0 victory. He made his Premier League debut on 28 November, replacing Eden Hazard in the 82nd minute of a 0–0 draw in the West London derby at home to Fulham. On 2 January 2013, Marin made his first start for Chelsea in a 0–1 loss to local rivals Queens Park Rangers. On 9 February 2013, Marin scored his first Premier League goal for Chelsea, coming on in the 91st minute and scoring on his first touch with a header in the 92nd minute; as a substitute in a 4–1 home victory over Wigan Athletic.

==== Loan to Sevilla ====
On 28 June 2013, Chelsea confirmed that they had reached an agreement for the season-long loan of Marin to Sevilla, subject to the completion of legal documentation and a medical. Marin scored his first goal for Sevilla in a 3–1 friendly win over Manchester United during Rio Ferdinand's testimonial. He netted two goals in Sevilla's first-leg Europa League play-off tie against Śląsk Wrocław, a 4–1 home win on 22 August. Marin started on the bench in the Europa final, coming on late in the second half, and then substituted in extra-time as Sevilla beat Benfica 4–2 in penalties. With this win, Marin won the Europa League in back to back seasons, winning it the year before with his home-club Chelsea.

==== Loan to Fiorentina ====
On 18 August 2014, Fiorentina confirmed that they had reached an agreement for the season-long loan of Marin from Chelsea with an option to buy. On 23 October, Marin made his début for Fiorentina in a Europa League match against PAOK. Marin scored his first goal for the Italian side on 27 November 2014, in a Europa League match against Guingamp. In the sixth minute, Marin was able to pick up Aquilani's pass and clipped home the opening goal, as Fiorentina edges out the French side in a 2–1 win. On 11 December 2014, Marin scored in a 2–1 loss against Dinamo Minsk.

Although Marin was on the bench 12 times, he failed to make a single appearance in the league before ending his loan early in January.

==== Loan to Anderlecht ====
On 20 January 2015, after an unsuccessful loan spell at Fiorentina, Marin joined Anderlecht for the remainder of the season, with an option to buy at the end of the campaign. Five days after moving to Belgium, Marin made his debut coming off the bench, replacing Maxime Colin in the 75th minute in a 2–0 loss to Standard Liège. Marin was in the starting line-up of the Belgian Cup Final, although he was substituted in the second-half after suffering a hamstring injury as Anderlecht lost 2–1, with Lior Refaelov scoring a late volley.

Anderlecht decided to pass on the option to buy Marin at the end of the season after he suffered a hamstring injury during the Belgium Cup final which ruled him out for several weeks.

==== Loan to Trabzonspor ====
On 25 August 2015, Marin joined Trabzonspor on a season-long loan, with an option to buy. On 30 August, Marin made his début for Trabzonspor in a 2–2 draw against Akhisar Belediyespor coming on as a second-half substitute. On 26 September 2015, Marin scored his first goal with the Turkish side in a 3–1 loss against Osmanlıspor. On 15 February 2016, Marin scored in a 2–1 win over Kayserispor.

In an interview with kicker, Marin showed his appreciation towards Chelsea for taking care of him since his move to London and also expressed no regrets with his move to Chelsea even though he acknowledge that his future is most likely going to be elsewhere.

=== Olympiacos ===
On 23 August 2016, Marin joined Greek side Olympiacos on a three-year deal. On 11 September 2016, he made his debut in a 6–1 victory against Veria. After being sidelined for about two months due to manager Paulo Bento not featuring him in his first-team plans, he returned to action on 5 January 2017, netting the winning goal in a 2–1 home comeback win over Asteras Tripolis.

On 17 December 2017, thanks to an impressive long-range effort by Marin, Olympiacos won 1–0 against PAS Giannina. It was the sixth consecutive victory for team of experienced manager Takis Lemonis and the Reds climbed at first Super League position, with 32 points after 15 matches, one more than rivals AEK and PAOK. On 7 January 2018, he opened the score in a 3–0 away win game against AEL, helping his club to achieve the 7th successive win in his rally to gain the eighth consecutive title.

=== Red Star Belgrade ===
After Red Star Belgrade qualified for the 2018–19 UEFA Champions League group stage (their first ever appearance in its current format), Marin signed a three-year contract with the club for an estimated transfer fee in the range of €700,000 and was registered in the last hour of the summer transfer window in Serbia. Marin scored a goal on his debut with Red Star on 15 September 2018, in a 6–0 home victory against Radnik Surdulica. Marin became the club's first ever goal scorer in the Champions League after giving Red Star a consolation goal in the 6–1 loss against PSG On 18 October 2018. Almost three weeks later, on 6 November 2018 to be exact, Marin was once again involved in Red Star's first ever Champions League campaign, this time by assisting Milan Pavkov's first goal in their historic 2–0 win against Liverpool. On 13 March 2019, Marin agreed to extend his contract with Red Star to the summer of 2021. Marin was voted MVP in the 2018–19 season and was also therefore included in the team of the season. Before the start of the 2019–20 season, Red Star's general director Zvezdan Terzić confirmed that Marin would become the new club captain.

=== Al-Ahli ===
On 5 January 2020, Marin signed for the Saudi Arabian club, Al-Ahli a €6 million contract until the summer of 2022, for an estimated transfer fee in the range of €2.5 million.

=== Ferencváros ===
In September 2021, Marin transferred to Ferencváros. The Hungarian league became his ninth top-flight league (in the Serie A, he didn't feature when on loan at Fiorentina) in his career which ended in 2022.

== International career ==
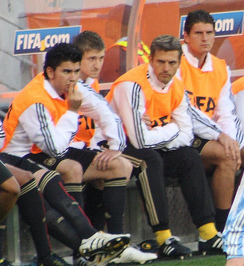
Marin (second from left) with Germany at the 2010 World Cup

In 2010, Marin stated that he never received a call from Bosnia and Herzegovina or Serbia, so he decided to play for Germany.

In 2007, Marin also received a call up to his under-21 national squad and has since played on nine occasions. On 16 May 2008, it was announced that Marin would be included in senior squad coach Joachim Löw's provisional 26-man squad for UEFA Euro 2008. He did not, however, make the final 23. Marin made his debut on 27 May 2008 in a 2–2 draw against Belarus, entering the game as a half-time substitution for Bastian Schweinsteiger. He was eventually cut from the final squad on 28 May 2008.

In the same year, on 20 August, he made his second appearance for Germany and scored his first goal in a friendly match against Belgium. Marin was also a German under-21 international, picked for the European team in the Meridian Cup.

Marin was included in Germany's provisional squad for the 2010 FIFA World Cup in South Africa announced in May 2010, and following a string of impressive performances in warm-up games (most of which he played as a substitute), was named in the final 23-man squad. He would go on to play twice at the World Cup in South Africa, both as a substitute in Germany's 4–0 win over Australia and in the subsequent 1–0 loss to his former neighbour Serbia. After disappointing performances however, notably in the game against Serbia, Marin was not selected for any more games, as Germany finished third in the tournament. His final caps for Germany came in late 2010.

== Technical director of Crvena zvezda ==
Marin’s appointment as head of the scouting department at the Belgrade club was officially confirmed in June 2022.[175] In a New Year’s interview, he said that he had enrolled in sports management studies during his playing career.[176] In April 2023, Marin was appointed technical director of Crvena zvezda.[177][178]

During the aforementioned period, Crvena zvezda competed twice in the Europa League and twice in the Champions League, while in the 2026/27 season, they will represent Serbian football in the Conference League. Since 2022, Crvena zevzda have won four league titles and an equal number of Serbian Cup trophies.

== Career statistics ==
=== Club ===
Appearances and goals by club, season and competition
Club	Season	League			National cup		League cup		Continental		Other		Total	
Club	Season	Division	Apps	Goals	Apps	Goals	Apps	Goals	Apps	Goals	Apps	Goals	Apps	Goals
Borussia Mönchengladbach II	2006–07	Regionalliga Nord	16	3	—		—		—		—		16	3
Borussia Mönchengladbach	2006–07	Bundesliga	4	0	0	0	—		—		—		4	0
Borussia Mönchengladbach	2007–08	2. Bundesliga	31	4	2	3	—		—		—		33	7
Borussia Mönchengladbach	2008–09	Bundesliga	33	4	2	1	—		—		—		35	5
Borussia Mönchengladbach	Total		68	8	4	4	—		—		—		72	12
Werder Bremen	2009–10	Bundesliga	32	4	6	1	—		12 (Note: Appearances in UEFA Europa League)	2	—		50	7
Werder Bremen	2010–11	Bundesliga	34	3	2	1	—		8 (Note: Appearances in UEFA Champions League)	1	—		44	5
Werder Bremen	2011–12	Bundesliga	21	1	1	0	—		—		—		22	1
Werder Bremen	Total		87	8	9	2	—		20	3	—		116	13
Chelsea	2012–13	Premier League	6	1	3	0	3	0	3	0	1 (Note: Appearances in FIFA Club World Cup)	0	16	1
Sevilla (loan)	2013–14	La Liga	18	0	0	0	—		12	2	—		30	2
Fiorentina (loan)	2014–15	Serie A	0	0	0	0	—		4	2	—		4	2
Anderlecht (loan)	2014–15	Belgian Pro League	6	0	2	0	—		—		—		8	0
Trabzonspor (loan)	2015–16	Süper Lig	24	2	5	0	—		—		—		29	2
Olympiacos	2016–17	Super League Greece	14	4	5	0	—		4	0	—		23	4
Olympiacos	2017–18	Super League Greece	23	7	6	0	—		7	1	—		36	8
Olympiacos	Total		37	11	11	0	—		11	1	—		59	12
Red Star Belgrade	2018–19	Serbian SuperLiga	22	6	4	0	—		5	1	—		31	7
Red Star Belgrade	2019–20	Serbian SuperLiga	12	3	1	0	—		14	1	—		27	4
Red Star Belgrade	Total		34	9	5	0	—		19	2	—		58	11
Al-Ahli Saudi FC	2019–20	Saudi Pro League	9	0	2	1	—		6 (Note: Appearances in AFC Champions League)	1	—		17	2
Al-Ahli Saudi FC	2020–21	Saudi Pro League	8	1	1	0	—		—		—		9	1
Al-Ahli Saudi FC	Total		17	2	3	1	—		6	1	—		26	3
Career total			313	43	42	7	3	0	75	11	1	0	434	61

=== International ===
Scores and results list Germany's goal tally first, score column indicates score after Marin goal.

International goal scored by Marko Marin
No.	Date	Venue	Opponent	Score	Result	Competition
1	20 August 2008	Frankenstadion, Nuremberg, Germany	Belgium	2–0	2–0	Friendly

== Honours ==
Borussia Mönchengladbach

- 2. Bundesliga: 2007–08

Werder Bremen

- DFB-Pokal runner-up: 2009–10

Chelsea

- UEFA Europa League: 2012–13
- FIFA Club World Cup runner-up: 2012

Sevilla

- UEFA Europa League: 2013–14

Anderlecht

- Belgian Cup runner-up: 2014–15

Olympiacos

- Super League Greece: 2016–17

Red Star Belgrade

- Serbian SuperLiga: 2018–19, 2019–20
- Serbian Cup runner-up: 2018–19

Ferencváros

- NB I: 2021–22
- Magyar Kupa: 2021–22

Germany U21

- UEFA European Under-21 Championship: 2009

Germany

- FIFA World Cup third place: 2010

Individual

- Fritz Walter Medal: U17 Silver Medal 2006
- Fritz Walter Medal: U18 Gold Medal 2007
- Serbian SuperLiga Player of the Season: 2018–19
- Serbian SuperLiga Team of the Season: 2018–19

Orders

- Silbernes Lorbeerblatt: 2010
