= Serbia national football team =

Men's association football team

Serbia
- Nickname: Orlovi (The Eagles)
- Association: Fudbalski savez Srbije (FSS)
- Confederation: UEFA (Europe)
- Head coach: Veljko Paunović
- Captain: Dušan Tadić
- Most caps: Dušan Tadić (117)
- Top scorer: Aleksandar Mitrović (64)
- Home stadium: Various
- FIFA code: SRB
First colours	Second colours

FIFA ranking
- Current: 46 ▼2 (18 November 2026)
- Highest: 6 (December 1998)
- Lowest: 101 (December 1994)

First international
- as Yugoslavia; Czechoslovakia 7–0 Kingdom of SCS (Antwerp, Belgium; 28 August 1920) as FR Yugoslavia/Serbia and Montenegro; Brazil 2–0 FR Yugoslavia (Porto Alegre, Brazil; 23 December 1994) as Serbia; Unofficial; FS Serbia 2–1 FS Montenegro (Belgrade, Yugoslavia; 3 September 1945); Official; Czech Republic 1–3 Serbia (Uherské Hradiště, Czech Republic; 16 August 2006)

Biggest win
- as Yugoslavia; Yugoslavia 10–0 Venezuela (Curitiba, Brazil; 14 June 1972) as Serbia; Azerbaijan 1–6 Serbia (Baku, Azerbaijan; 17 October 2007); Serbia 6–1 Bulgaria (Belgrade, Serbia; 19 November 2008); Serbia 5–0 Romania (Belgrade, Serbia; 10 October 2009); Serbia 6–1 Wales (Novi Sad, Serbia; 11 September 2012); Serbia 5–0 Russia (Belgrade, Serbia; 18 November 2020)

Biggest defeat
- as Yugoslavia; Czechoslovakia 7–0 Kingdom of SCS (Antwerp, Belgium; 28 August 1920); Uruguay 7–0 Kingdom of SCS (Paris, France; 26 May 1924); Czechoslovakia 7–0 Kingdom of SCS (Prague, Czechoslovakia; 28 October 1925) as Serbia; Ukraine 5–0 Serbia (Lviv, Ukraine; 7 June 2019); Serbia 0–5 England (Belgrade, Serbia; 9 September 2025)

World Cup
- Appearances: 13 (first in 1930)
- Best result: As Yugoslavia: Fourth place (1930, 1962); As FR Yugoslavia/Serbia and Montenegro: Round of 16 (1998); As Serbia: Group stage (2010, 2018, 2022)

European Championship
- Appearances: 6 (first in 1960)
- Best result: As Yugoslavia: Runners-up (1960, 1968); As FR Yugoslavia/Serbia and Montenegro: Quarter-finals (2000); As Serbia: Group stage (2024)
Medal record
European Championship (Note: All honours won as Yugoslavia)
Silver medal – second place	1960 France	Team
Silver medal – second place	1968 Italy	Team
Olympic Games
Gold medal – first place	1960 Rome	Team
Silver medal – second place	1948 London	Team
Silver medal – second place	1952 Helsinki	Team
Silver medal – second place	1956 Melbourne	Team
Bronze medal – third place	1984 Los Angeles	Team
Balkan Cup
Gold medal – first place	1934–35 Greece	Team
Gold medal – first place	1935 Bulgaria	Team
Mediterranean Games
Gold medal – first place	1971 Izmir	Team
Gold medal – first place	1979 Split	Team
- Website: fss.rs

The Serbia national football team (Serbian Cyrillic: Фудбалска репрезентација Србије, romanized: Fudbalska reprezentacija Srbije) represents Serbia in men's international football competition. It is controlled by the Football Association of Serbia, the governing body for football in Serbia.

After the breakup of SFR Yugoslavia and its football team in 1992 Serbia was represented (alongside Montenegro) within the new FR Yugoslavia national football team. Despite qualifying for Euro 1992 the team was banned from participating in the tournament due to international sanctions, with the ruling also enforced for 1994 World Cup and Euro 1996 qualifiers. The national team played its first friendly in December 1994, and with the easing of sanctions the generation of the 1990s eventually participated at the 1998 World Cup, reaching the round of 16, and the quarter-finals at Euro 2000. The team played in the 2006, 2010, 2018 and 2022 FIFA World Cups, but failed to progress past the group stage on each occasion.

Between February 2003 and June 2006, Serbia participated as the Serbia and Montenegro national football team due to the countries' name change. Following a 2006 referendum Montenegro declared its independence, leading to separate football federations which resulted in the team's final renaming and establishment as the Serbia national football team. Serbia is considered by FIFA and UEFA to be the official successor team of FR Yugoslavia/Serbia and Montenegro national football teams, as well as the Kingdom of Yugoslavia/SFR Yugoslavia team.

== History ==
=== Serbia within Yugoslavia (1920–1992) ===
The Football Federation of what was then the Kingdom of Serbs, Croats and Slovenes (later Yugoslavia) was founded in Zagreb in 1919 under the name Jugoslavenski nogometni savez (Yugoslavian Football Association). Jovan Ružić was the first Serb to represent the national team in its international debut match, a 7–0 drubbing by Czechoslovakia at the 1920 Olympic Games in Antwerp, Belgium.

In 1921, the Belgrade Football Subassociation organized a friendly match between the France national football team and a Belgrade XI, dubbed the "Serbian representatives". The team featured footballers from SK Jugoslavija and BSK, two of the Serbian clubs of the interwar period. The French delegation was on a four-game tour of Yugoslavia with the last exhibition game being played in Belgrade's SK Jugoslavija Stadium on 3 July. Prince Regent Aleksandar I and FIFA President Jules Rimet were in attendance as the visitors triumphed 3–0.

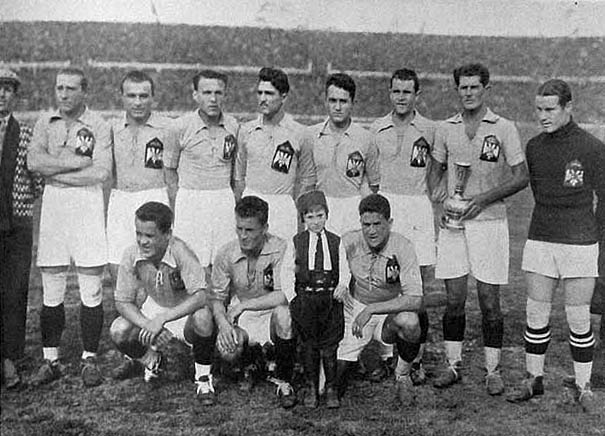
Yugoslavia at the 1930 FIFA World Cup, featured an all Serbian team following a boycott by Croat representatives.

In the lead-up to the 1930 World Cup, a dispute regarding the relocation of the FAs headquarters from Zagreb to the capital Belgrade erupted, culminating in a boycott by the Zagreb Subassociation which disallowed its members to participate in the upcoming tournament. The de facto Serbian team led by coach Boško Simonović, composed largely of players from Belgrade's BSK, SK Jugoslavija and BASK, reached the semi-final, losing to hosts and eventual winners Uruguay 6–1. The royal interbellum era featured footballers such as Blagoje Marjanović, Aleksandar Tirnanić, Milorad Arsenijević, Đorđe Vujadinović, Branislav Sekulić and Milutin Ivković. Due to the dismemberment of Yugoslavia during World War II the football federation and national team ceased activities but reformed following the end of hostilities.

In 1945 Svetislav Glišović led the first unofficial national team representing the Federal State of Serbia in a tournament held to mark the end of World War II. The Serbian team encompassing the newly established Red Star squad won its first game by beating FS Montenegro 2–1, FS Croatia 3–1 in the semi-final, then proceeding to win the tournament against the Yugoslav People's Army team 1–0 in Belgrade.

The reconstituted Yugoslavia reached the UEFA European Championship finals in 1960 and 1968, and finished fourth place at the 1962 FIFA World Cup. During its existence Serbian footballers would continually play a major role in the Yugoslavia national team throughout the socialist era, with the likes of Rajko Mitić, Branko Stanković, Vladimir Beara, Vujadin Boškov, Todor Veselinović, Miloš Milutinović, Borivoje Kostić, Milan Galić, Vladimir Durković, Velibor Vasović, Dragan Džajić, Jovan Aćimović, Dušan Bajević, Vladimir Petrović and others until the states disintegrated in the 1990s. The national team of SFR Yugoslavia played its last game on 25 March 1992, losing 2–0 to the Netherlands.

=== FR Yugoslavia/Serbia & Montenegro era (1992–2006) ===
While the Federal Republic of Yugoslavia, consisting of Serbia and Montenegro, was formed on 27 April 1992, its teams were banned from all international sporting events, including the national football team as a result of U.N. sanctions stemming from the conflict in Yugoslavia. Consequently, the national team did not play its first game as a new country before 23 December 1994, a friendly match played in Porto Alegre and in which Brazil won 2–0. This was the first ever team composed of Serbian and Montenegrin players exclusively, while Slobodan Santrač, a former Yugoslavia national team player, was named the team's first ever manager. The next game was played three days later, this time in Buenos Aires, resulting in a 1–0 loss to Argentina.

Due to international sanctions, the team could not participate in 1994 World Cup qualifying nor the Euro 1996 qualifying process.

==== 1998 World Cup ====
As FR Yugoslavia joined FIFA and UEFA in 1994, the team was available to participate in the 1998 World Cup qualifiers. Slobodan Santrač was appointed manager for the team. In the qualifiers, Yugoslavia was drawn in Group 6 with Euro 1996 runners-up Czech Republic, Slovakia, Spain, Faroe Islands and Malta. With 23 points, Yugoslavia ended up in second place behind Spain. Yugoslavia qualified for the play-off in which they were drawn to play against Hungary. Winning 12–1 on aggregate, Yugoslavia qualified for the World Cup.

The draw put the team in Group F alongside Germany, the United States, and Iran. Yugoslavia won its first game 1–0 against Iran thanks to a goal from defender Siniša Mihajlović. The next game was a draw for Yugoslavia; after leading Germany 2–0, a free kick from Michael Tarnat deflected off Mihajlović and into the goal, then Oliver Bierhoff equalised it at 2–2 at the 80th minute. Yugoslavia responded in the next game against the United States and won 1–0 due to a goal in the fourth minute by Slobodan Komljenović. Yugoslavia finished second in the group behind Germany on goal difference.

Due to their second position, Yugoslavia saw itself face the Netherlands in the Round of 16. Yugoslavia entered in the match with a sole attacker, but its defensive tactics proved unsuccessful as Dennis Bergkamp put the Netherlands in front in the 38th minute. Following the start of the second half, Yugoslavia pressured the Dutch, who conceded a header from Komljenović. The turning point of this match was a penalty awarded to Yugoslavia after Vladimir Jugović was fouled. Predrag Mijatović missed, and the scoreline remained the same at 1–1. Such an event demoralized the Yugoslavs, as the Dutch took the initiative. In the late seconds of the game Edgar Davids' shot towards the Yugoslav net from a distance of 20 meters and beat goalkeeper Ivica Kralj.

==== Euro 2000 ====
The draw for the Euro 2000 qualifiers saw first-seeded Yugoslavia drawn in a group with Croatia, thus marking the first games between the two teams after the breakup of Yugoslavia. The other teams in the group were the Republic of Ireland, Macedonia, and Malta. Milan Živadinović was dismissed and was replaced by Vujadin Boškov.

The team started with a 1–0 win over the Republic of Ireland in Belgrade, before beating Malta 3–0 in Ta' Qali. The home fixture against the Maltese followed, but was moved to Thessaloniki, Greece due to the NATO bombing of Yugoslavia. The team won 4–1. The first match against Croatia took place in Belgrade after the bombing ended, and was interrupted due to a power outage at the beginning of the second half, resuming after 43 minutes and eventually finishing 0–0. A 2–1 defeat against Ireland in Dublin was followed by victories home and away against Macedonia (3–1 and 4–2 respectively), meaning that Yugoslavia needed to win its final qualifier against Croatia in Zagreb, or to draw with the Republic of Ireland failing to beat Macedonia in Skopje, in order to qualify automatically for Euro 2000. In the event, the Republic of Ireland conceded an injury-time equaliser, meaning that Yugoslavia's 2–2 draw with the Croatians put them through.

The draw for the finals placed Yugoslavia in Group C along with Spain, Norway and another former Yugoslav republic, Slovenia. The Slovenians took a 3–0 lead in the first game at the Stade du Pays de Charleroi, but three goals in six second-half minutes enabled Yugoslavia to secure a 3–3 draw. Thanks to an early Savo Milošević backheel strike, the Serbs beat Norway 1–0 in Liège. The final group game, against Spain in Bruges, saw the Yugoslavs take the lead three times, before a Gaizka Mendieta penalty and an Alfonso strike in injury-time secured a 4–3 win for the Spaniards and top spot in the group. Yugoslavia nonetheless finished second, level on points with Norway but ranked ahead due to its victory in Liège. In each of the three games, the team had one player sent off (Siniša Mihajlović, Mateja Kežman, and Slaviša Jokanović, respectively). In the quarter-finals, Yugoslavia was paired with the Netherlands. The co-hosts won 6–1 in Rotterdam with Patrick Kluivert scoring a hat-trick. Despite Yugoslavia's elimination, Savo Milošević was crowned the joint top scorer of the tournament alongside Patrick Kluivert. Both players scored five goals, although Milošević played one game fewer.

==== 2002 World Cup campaign ====
Ilija Petković replaced Boškov as head coach in July 2000. For the 2002 World Cup qualifiers, Yugoslavia was drawn in Group 1 with Russia, Slovenia, Switzerland, the Faroe Islands and Luxembourg. After winning against Luxembourg, Petković was sacked and replaced with a three-pieced team which consisted of Boškov, Dejan Savićević and Ivan Ćurković. Yugoslavia won both matches against Luxembourg and the Faroe Islands, as well as the away game against Switzerland, but suffered a home loss and an away draw against Russia, a home draw against Switzerland, and draws in both home and away games against Slovenia. Yugoslavia ended the qualifying campaign in third place in the group, just one point behind second-placed Slovenia who advanced to the second round of qualifying.

==== Euro 2004 campaign ====
Savićević was appointed as coach in July 2002. For the Euro 2004 qualifiers Yugoslavia was drawn in Group 9 with Italy, Wales, Finland and Azerbaijan. During qualifying, the country went under a political transformation, and the newly named Serbia and Montenegro appeared for the first time in a game against Azerbaijan in February 2003. In June, after a 2–1 loss to Azerbaijan, Savićević resigned and was replaced by Ilija Petković. Despite drawing both games against eventual group winners Italy and winning both games against runners-up Wales, Serbia and Montenegro failed to qualify, mostly due to a 2–2 home draw, the 2–1 loss to Azerbaijan, as well as a 3–0 away loss to Finland.

==== 2006 World Cup ====
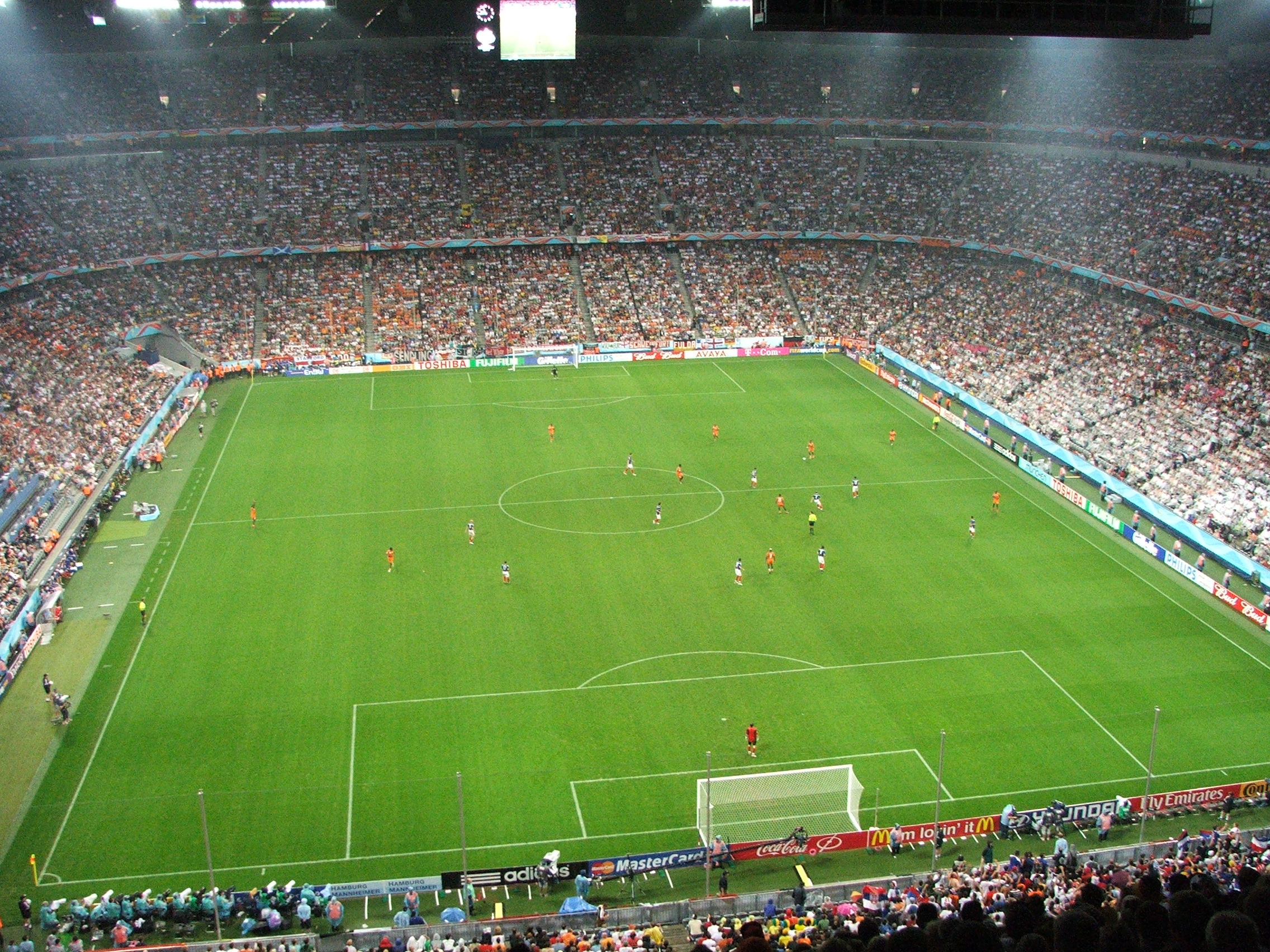
Serbia and Montenegro and Ivory Coast playing at the Allianz Arena in the 2006 FIFA World Cup

Petković remained as manager for the team. Qualifying for the 2006 World Cup resulted in six wins and four draws, with Serbia and Montenegro ending up first in the group with an undefeated record in their qualification group ahead of Spain, Belgium, Bosnia and Herzegovina, Lithuania and San Marino. The Serbia and Montenegro team also allowed only one goal in the ten matches, the best defensive record of all 51 teams participating in qualification.

On 3 June 2006, following a referendum, Montenegro declared its independence from Serbia. As the World Cup was about to start, it was decided that the Serbia and Montenegro team that had qualified for the tournament would compete, with the split into separate teams representing the new countries of Montenegro and Serbia to take place once the team was no longer in the tournament.

In the group stage, Serbia and Montenegro lost their opening game to the Netherlands. The final score was 1–0 after Arjen Robben scored the only goal of the game. They also lost their second game to Argentina 6–0, Serbia and Montenegro's worst ever international result. With the team's two losses and with Netherlands and Argentina winning both their games, Serbia and Montenegro could no longer qualify for the knockout matches and was playing for pride alone in their final group game against Ivory Coast. After a 2–0 lead for much of the first half, the Elephants managed to come back and win 3–2, leaving Serbia and Montenegro with no points.

=== Independent Serbia (2006–present) ===
==== Euro 2008 campaign ====
Javier Clemente, Serbia's first-ever foreign coach, was appointed to lead the team for the 2008 Euro campaign. After Montenegro declared independence, Serbia marked their split from Montenegro with a 3–1 win over the Czech Republic. For the Euro 2008 qualifiers, Serbia was drawn in Group A along with Poland, Portugal, Belgium, Finland, Kazakhstan, Armenia and Azerbaijan. A strong start in qualification was overshadowed by the final hurdle of matches where inconsistency took over, the side dropping points against the likes of Finland, Belgium, Armenia and Kazakhstan. They eventually finished third, three points behind runners-up Portugal and Group A winners Poland. Clemente was sacked after the team's failure to qualify.

Serbia replaced Clemente with Miroslav Đukić, who then left the position on 19 August of the following year without having played any official games, due to disagreements with the Football Association of Serbia.

==== 2010 World Cup ====
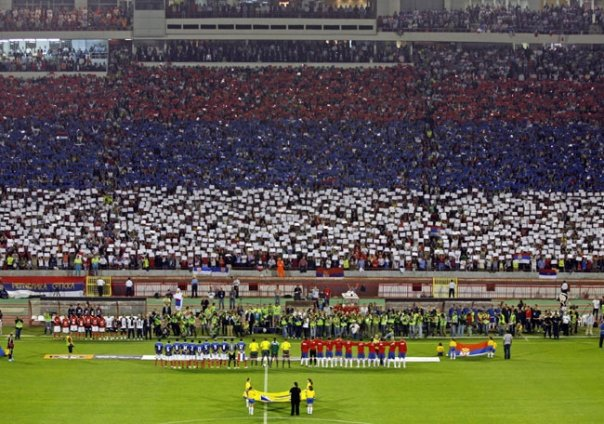
Atmosphere at the start of match vs. France, 9 September 2009

Serbia's starting XI under coach Radomir Antić in their 1–0 win over Germany at the 2010 FIFA World Cup.

Subsequent to Ðukić's departure, Radomir Antić was appointed coach. Serbia's World Cup qualification campaign began in 2008. Their qualification group featured 1998 World Cup winners and 2006 World Cup runners-up France, Romania, as well as Austria, Lithuania and the Faroe Islands. Serbia played consistently during the qualifiers and this led to the team automatically qualifying for the 2010 FIFA World Cup in South Africa. They confirmed qualification with a 5–0 home victory against Romania.

The 2010 World Cup team featured captain Dejan Stanković, who became the only player to feature in a World Cup having played under three different national names (although he never changed nationality; this was a result of geopolitical events involving the identity of Yugoslavia). They faced Ghana, Germany, Australia.

Their opening group game was against Ghana and chances came to both sides but a red card to Aleksandar Luković and a handball by substitute Zdravko Kuzmanović in the second half gave Ghana a penalty to take all three points at the death. Asamoah Gyan converted eight minutes from full-time and Serbia were defeated 1–0. In Serbia's second group match, they defeated Germany by a score of 1–0 with a goal by Milan Jovanović in the first half. FIFA's official YouTube channel called the win "the most famous day in Serbia's footballing history".

Serbia only needed a single point to reach the knockout stages, but was defeated by Australia 2–1. Australia scored two goals in the second half through Tim Cahill and Brett Holman. A late Marko Pantelić goal served only as a consolation. They finished last in the group.

==== Euro 2012 campaign ====
Radomir Antić was sacked two games into the UEFA Euro 2012 qualifying process, a 1–1 home draw against Slovenia ending his two-year stint. The dismissal meant the bringing in of Vladimir Petrović to the job.

For the UEFA Euro 2012 qualifying, Serbia was drawn in Group C featuring Italy, Slovenia, Estonia, Northern Ireland and the Faroe Islands. The qualifying stage began with Antić as coach and finished with Vladimir Petrović. Serbia started the first two games with a 3–0 win away to Faroe Islands and a 1–1 draw at home to Slovenia but this result ended Antić's stint as the country's coach. New coach Petrović faced setbacks with a 3–1 home loss against Estonia and an abandoned match resulting in a 3–0 loss to Italy due to crowd trouble from the Serbian away supporters in Genoa.

Serbia returned to form with a 2–1 home victory over Northern Ireland but could only manage a 1–1 away draw against Estonia. Afterwards, Serbia won back to back games with a 1–0 win away to Northern Ireland and a crucial 3–1 home victory against Faroe Islands. These results put Serbia in pole position to confirm a play-off spot behind Italy.

Serbia needed a home victory against Italy to confirm a play-off spot but their efforts only resulted in a 1–1 draw. However, the team still had one more chance to confirm a play-off place when they faced Slovenia away. Serbia also must win the match despite having superior goal difference over Estonia; a draw was not good enough for progression. Neither side played better in the first half, but a long-range goal put Slovenia up 1–0 at half time. In the second half, Nemanja Vidić missed penalty. Serbia left empty-handed after a 1–0 loss and exited the tournament for the third time in a row during the qualifying group stages, missing out by one point behind Estonia. Serbia once again failed to qualify for the European Championships. Vladimir Petrović was sacked after the team's failure to qualify.

==== 2014 World Cup campaign ====
Ahead of the qualifying campaign for the 2014 FIFA World Cup, Dejan Stanković and Nemanja Vidić announced that they were retiring from international football. Branislav Ivanović became the new captain. Siniša Mihajlović, a former member of the national team, was appointed as the coach on 24 April 2012. Serbia was drawn in Group A in qualification for the 2014 World Cup, together with Croatia, Belgium, Scotland, Macedonia, and Wales. The team began the qualification campaign with a goalless draw with Scotland and a 6–1 win over Wales. In the next two games, Serbia suffered two defeats from Macedonia and Belgium.

On 22 March 2013, Serbia played in Zagreb against Croatia. The game was highly anticipated in both countries due to their rivalry both on and off the pitch. Croatia won 2–0. Serbia defeated Scotland 2–0 at home in a crucial qualifier, but their World Cup hopes were taken away after a 2–1 defeat to Belgium. Serbia drew with Croatia 1–1 in the corresponding fixture at home, where 18-year-old Aleksandar Mitrović scored an equalizer in the second-half after Mario Mandžukić opened the scoring. They defeated Wales 3–0 in Cardiff. Dejan Stanković's farewell game was completed in a friendly against Japan, which Serbia won 2–0. He finished his career with 103 appearances for the national team, a record previously held by Savo Milošević, with 102 appearances. Serbia finished qualifying with a 5–1 home win against Macedonia, putting them in third in the group, three points from a playoff spot behind Croatia and group winners Belgium.

==== Euro 2016 campaign ====
After failing to qualify for the 2014 World Cup, Dick Advocaat was appointed as the coach in 2014. Serbia was drawn in Group I in qualification for UEFA Euro 2016, together with Portugal, Denmark, Albania and Armenia. Advocaat started with a 1–1 friendly draw against France and began qualification with the same result against Armenia. The following game was a game against Albania in Belgrade, abandoned as a result of crowd trouble after a drone carrying an Albanian flag and a map of Greater Albania was flown over the pitch. Serbia was originally awarded with a 3–0 victory by UEFA, and deducted three points, but on 10 July 2015, the Court of Arbitration for Sport (CAS) reversed the earlier decision and awarded Albania a 3–0 victory. On 14 November 2014, Serbia played against Denmark in Belgrade and lost, 1–3. After this game, Advocaat left, whereupon Radovan Ćurčić was announced as a new coach on 25 November.

Serbia's first match in 2015 was a qualifying match against Portugal in Lisbon, during which Serbia lost 2–1, cutting their chances for qualification to Euro 2016. On 13 June 2015, Serbia played a qualifying match against Denmark in Copenhagen, losing 2–0. With the 10 July ruling by CAS on the abandoned game against Albania, Serbia would become mathematically eliminated from Euro 2016 qualification. On 4 September 2015, Serbia had their first victory, winning 2–0, against Armenia. On 8 October 2015, Serbia defeated Albania with a goal each from Aleksandar Kolarov and Adem Ljajić. In the table of Group I, Serbia finished second to last place with four points in a five-team group.

==== 2018 World Cup ====
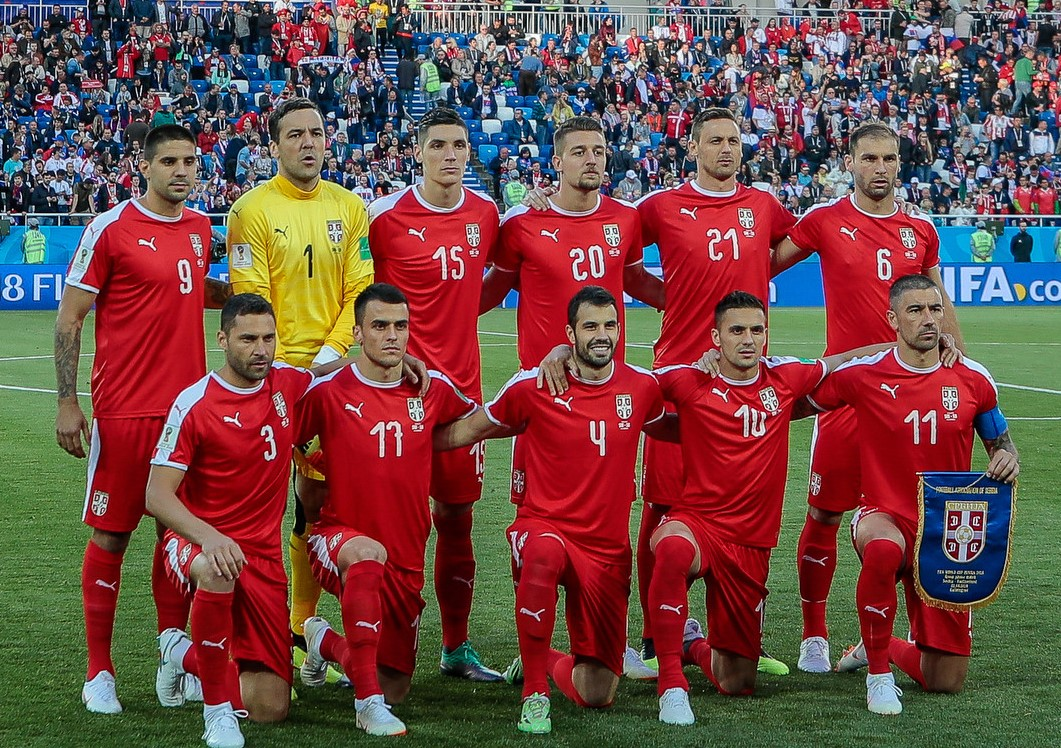
Serbia team at the 2018 World Cup in Russia

After failing to qualify for Euro 2016, Slavoljub Muslin was appointed as a coach. Serbia was drawn in Group D in qualification for the 2018 FIFA World Cup with Euro 2016 semi-finalists Wales, Austria, Ireland, Georgia and Moldova. They started off their campaign with a 2–2 draw against Ireland at the Red Star Stadium and eventually won against Austria, Georgia and Moldova.

Serbia beat Moldova in Belgrade with goals from Aleksandar Kolarov, Aleksandar Mitrović and Mijat Gaćinović. This consolidated their first position going into their top-of-the group clash with Ireland. They won this match with a 55th-minute goal from Kolarov. Serbia finished the qualifying campaign with a 1–0 home win against Georgia, and ended at the top of Group D and therefore qualified for the 2018 tournament. Despite Serbia's qualification, Muslin was sacked by the Football Association of Serbia as a result on differences regarding team selection. Muslin was criticized for not inviting Sergej Milinković-Savić to play in the campaign which sparked controversy in Serbia. Mladen Krstajić took the place as a temporary coach after Muslin's dismissal and led the team in the World Cup.

In the World Cup, Serbia opened their match against Costa Rica. Kolarov's free kick at the second half meant Serbia won their first World Cup game in eight years. Serbia lost their later encounters, losing 1–2 to Switzerland with a 90th-minute goal scored by Xherdan Shaqiri and 0–2 to Brazil, thus being eliminated in the group stage.

==== 2018–19 UEFA Nations League ====
Due to the performance of Serbia in previous years, the country found itself started the campaign of the inaugural Nations League, where they were drawn into Group 4 with Montenegro, Lithuania and Romania. With both wins against Lithuania and Montenegro and both draw games against Romania, Serbia finished on top of the group, securing the Euro 2020 play-off spot and being promoted into League B for 2020–21 season. With six goals, Aleksandar Mitrović finished the tournament as the top scorer.

==== Euro 2020 campaign ====
In December 2017, Mladen Krstajić became the permanent coach for Serbia. Serbia started the campaign of 2018–19 UEFA Nations League, which served as a part of UEFA Euro 2020 qualifying campaign.

For Euro 2020 qualifiers, Serbia was drawn into Group B with Euro 2016 champions Portugal, Ukraine, Lithuania and Luxembourg. Serbia kicked off the qualifiers with 1–1 away draw against Portugal. However, in the next away game against Ukraine, Serbia lost 5–0. Krstajić was sacked after the loss and replaced with Ljubiša Tumbaković. Tumbaković started with a 2–4 home loss against Portugal. The next two games were away wins against Luxembourg and Lithuania, before beating Luxembourg at home. Serbia then drew 2–2 to Ukraine at home, meaning they could not finish in the top two and a play-off would ensue.

After the UEFA Euro 2020 qualifying play-offs were resumed, Serbia placed itself against Norway in Oslo. Two goals, one in extra time helped Serbia to overcome Norway 2–1, thus marching to the final playoff game against Scotland at home. The game was won by Scotland in a penalty shootout (5–4) after the game was tied 1–1 after full time. Serbia once again failed to qualify for the Euros, making 20 years since the country last took part in the tournament. Tumbaković was sacked after the team's failure to qualify for the tournament.

==== 2022–23 UEFA Nations League ====
Serbia was drawn in 2022–23 UEFA Nations League B Group 4 alongside Norway, Sweden and Slovenia, finishing first and being promoted after wins against Sweden at home and Norway in Oslo.

==== 2022 World Cup ====
Serbia was drawn in Group A in qualification for the 2022 FIFA World Cup with Portugal, Republic of Ireland, Luxembourg and Azerbaijan.

After a penalty shootout loss against Scotland in the Euro 2020 qualifying playoffs, Ljubiša Tumbaković was sacked and replaced with Dragan Stojković.

Serbia started qualification with a 3–2 win against the Republic of Ireland in Belgrade in March 2021. After a 2–2 draw against Portugal, Serbia won against Azerbaijan in Baku 2–1. Mixed results meant Serbia needed a victory against Portugal to qualify directly from the group. On 14 November 2021, Serbia faced Portugal at the Estádio da Luz, and trailed by a goal. However, an equaliser by Dušan Tadić and a decisive goal from Aleksandar Mitrović in the final minutes of the second half meant Serbia automatically booked a ticket for Qatar.

Serbia was drawn in Group G with 2018 opponents Brazil and Switzerland, as well as African representatives Cameroon. Serbia was defeated in the first match against Brazil 2–0, drew against Cameroon 3–3, and lost against Switzerland 3–2 after a fight between multiple Serbs and Granit Xhaka, ending up with only one point.

==== Euro 2024 ====
Following the elimination in the group stage at the 2022 World Cup, Stojković stayed as a coach with a goal to bring Serbia to UEFA Euro 2024.

Serbia was drawn in Group G in qualification for Euro 2024 with Hungary, Montenegro, Bulgaria and Lithuania. Serbia started the qualifying campaign with 2–0 wins against Lithuania in Belgrade and Montenegro in Podgorica in March 2023. After a friendly match against Jordan in which Serbia won 3–2, Serbia ended up in a 1–1 draw against Bulgaria in Razgrad. For the next game against Hungary in Belgrade, Serbia was forced to play behind closed doors due to UEFA sanctioning the Serbian association chants against Montenegrins; Serbia eventually lost the game 1–2. The next game was another win against Lithuania in Kaunas, 3–1, with Aleksandar Mitrović scoring a hat-trick. On 14 October 2023, Serbia once again lost against Hungary in Budapest 1–2, but won against Montenegro in Belgrade 3–1 three days later. After the crucial final game against Bulgaria at home which ended in a 2–2 draw, Serbia ended the campaign in second place in group G with 14 points, qualifying for their first European Championship as an independent nation and in 24 years.

In the tournament, Serbia was drawn into group C with England, Slovenia and Denmark. They lost 1–0 to England in the first game. They followed that up with a 1–1 draw with Slovenia, after Luka Jović scored a last minute equalizer in extra time. They needed to beat Denmark in their last group stage match in order to advance, but came up with a 0–0 draw, resulting in their elimination.

== Rivalries ==
- Serbia v. Croatia: The rivalry stems from political roots, and is listed as one of the ten greatest international rivalries by Goal.com. and as the most politically charged football rivalry by the Bleacher Report. The two sides started the football rivalry in the 1990 when they were part of Yugoslavia, which dissolved after a series of wars. The two nations have played four times, with Croatia winning one and drawing the other three games.
- Serbia v. Albania: The rivalry stems from historical tensions and the Kosovo question. in which Albania has won two Matches and Serbia one Match so far.
- Serbia v. Switzerland: The rivalry is connected to the Albanian diaspora players in the Swiss football team and is linked to the tensions between the Albanians and the Serbs. The teams have faced each other 4 times, with Switzerland winning twice and Serbia once.

== Team image ==
The badge of the Football Association of Serbia is modelled on the Serbian cross inescutcheon featured on the Serbian coat of arms. It consists of a modified version of the four firesteels and cross, with the addition of a football. The team is nicknamed "the Eagles" (Serbian Cyrillic: Орлови) in reference to the white double-headed eagle, a national symbol of Serbia. The second nickname of the team is "the Blues" (Serbian Cyrillic: Плави), after the blue kits that the national team wore from 1920s to 2006 and again from 2025. In 2022 the Football Association of Serbia launched a new, national team specific emblem for brand and marketing purposes. The previous FA crest was replaced by a stylised logo inspired by the lesser coat of arms of the Republic of Serbia.

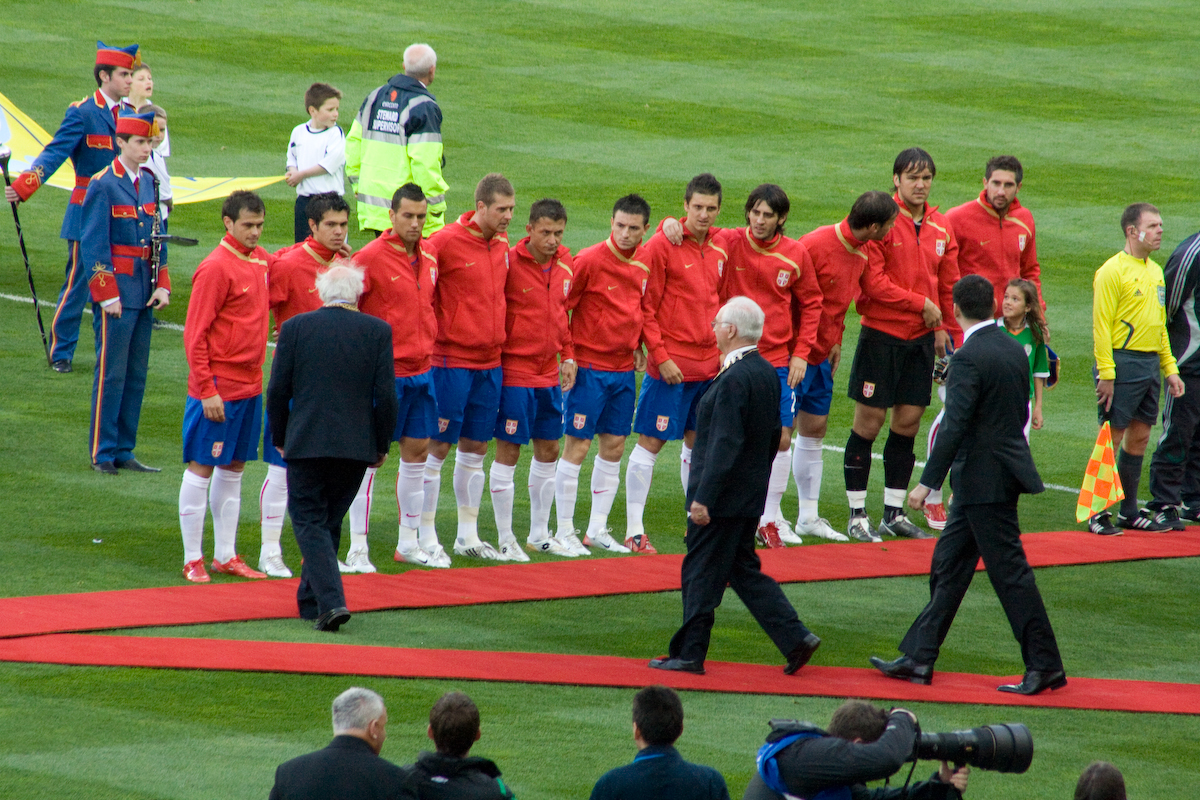
Serbia team before a friendly match versus Ireland in Dublin in May 2008

For years following the breakup of SFR Yugoslavia the national team experienced an identity crisis, which despite its name, was seen as de facto representative of Serbia. From 1994 to 2006 the obsolete and unpopular Communist era national anthem "Hej, Sloveni" was often jeered, booed and whistled by home supporters as players refrained from singing the lyrics. During this period the team continued to officially carry the old nickname "Plavi" (the Blues), badge and kit design indicative of the Yugoslav tricolour.

Following the secession of Montenegro in 2006 the national team adopted red shirts, blue shorts and white socks in honor of the Serbian tricolour. Between 2010 and 2016 a cross motif inspired by the country's coat of arms was incorporated in the jersey. In years Serbia has utilised all-red uniforms due to FIFA's kit clash regulations. Away kits are most commonly white with blue or white shorts. In 2025, the team officially returned to the traditional blue jerseys. This decision was mostly approved by the public.

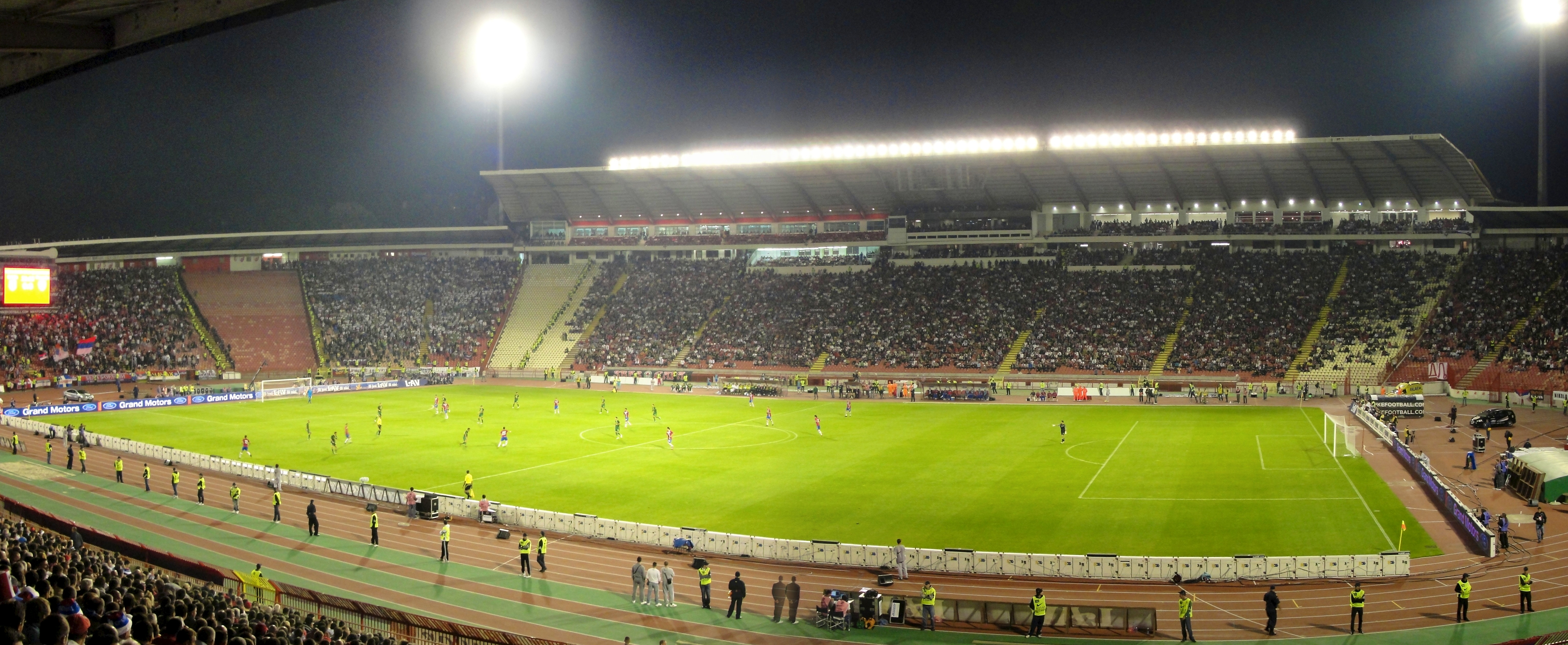
The 53,000-capacity Rajko Mitić Stadium is the largest in Serbia, and is often utilised for international fixtures.

Serbia does not have an official national stadium and the team has played at grounds throughout the country. The Rajko Mitić Stadium is the most popular venue following by Partizan Stadium, both ground are located in the capital city Belgrade.

=== Kit sponsorship ===
In July 2014, a partnership was announced between the Football Association of Serbia and English manufacturer Umbro, which is Serbia's official supplier, before Puma took over with their home and away kits, debuting 7 September 2014 in the friendly match against France. That same day, Serbia unveiled their latest kits also worn at the Euro 2016 qualifiers campaign. In January 2025, the Football Association of Serbia announced Capelli Sport as the new sponsor of the national team, replacing Puma.

Kit Supplier	Period
(Germany) Adidas	1974–2002
(Italy) Lotto	2002–2006
(United States) Nike	2006–2014
(England) Umbro	2014–2018
(Germany) Puma	2018–2025
(United States) Capelli Sport	2025–present

== Results and fixtures ==
The following is a list of match results in the last 12 months, as well as any future matches that have been scheduled.

Win Draw Loss Fixture

=== 2026 ===
27 March 2026 Friendly	Spain	3–0	Serbia	Villarreal, Spain
21:00 UTC+2	Oyarzabal 16', 44'; Muñoz 72'	Report (FIFA); Report (UEFA)		Stadium: Estadio de la Cerámica; Attendance: 20,482; Referee: Luis Godinho (Portugal)

31 March 2026 Friendly	Serbia	2–1	Saudi Arabia	Bačka Topola, Serbia (Note: The Serbia v Saudi Arabia match, originally scheduled to be played at the Jassim bin Hamad Stadium, Al Rayyan, Qatar, was relocated to Serbia due to the 2026 Iran war.)
18:00 UTC+2	Pavlović 66'; Mitrović 70'	Report (FIFA); Report (UEFA)	Al-Hamdan 8'	Stadium: TSC Arena; Attendance: 4,101; Referee: Balázs Berke (Hungary)

31 May 2026 Friendly	Cape Verde	3–0	Serbia	Lisbon, Portugal
17:00 UTC+2	Pina 11'; Duarte 59'; Benchimol 63'	Report (FIFA); Report (UEFA)		Stadium: Estádio do Restelo; Attendance: 7,500; Referee: João António Gonçalves (Portugal)

4 June 2026 Friendly	Mexico	5–1	Serbia	Toluca, Mexico
20:00 UTC−6	Vásquez 34'; Bukinac 45+3' (o.g.); Jiménez 57'; Avdić 72' (o.g.); Chávez 90'	Report (FIFA); Report (UEFA)	Stanić 19'	Stadium: Estadio Nemesio Diez; Attendance: 27,163; Referee: Keylor Herrera (Costa Rica)

24 September 2026 2026–27 UEFA Nations League	Serbia	1–2	Greece	Belgrade, Serbia
20:45	Živković 4'	Report (FIFA); Report (UEFA)	Tzolis 74'; Douvikas 90+5'	Stadium: Rajko Mitić Stadium; Attendance: 5,701; Referee: Glenn Nyberg (Sweden)

27 September 2026 2026–27 UEFA Nations League	Serbia	1–2	Netherlands	Belgrade, Serbia
18:00	Jović 46'	Report (FIFA); Report (UEFA)	Meerdink 30' (pen.), 69'	Stadium: Rajko Mitić Stadium; Attendance: 15,212; Referee: Szymon Marciniak (Poland)

1 October 2026 2026–27 UEFA Nations League	Germany	2–0	Serbia	Munich, Germany
20:45	Bischof 39'; Wirtz 61'	Report (FIFA); Report (UEFA)		Stadium: Allianz Arena; Attendance: 68,121; Referee: Espen Eskås (Norway)

4 October 2026 2026–27 UEFA Nations League	Netherlands	2–1	Serbia	Eindhoven, Netherlands
20:45	Koopmeiners 31'; Zirkzee 71'	Report (FIFA); Report (UEFA)	Cvetković 35'	Stadium: Philips Stadion; Attendance: 31,387; Referee: Donatas Rumšas (Lithuania)

13 November 2026 2026–27 UEFA Nations League	Serbia	1–3	Germany	Belgrade, Serbia
20:45	Babić 56'	Report (FIFA); Report (UEFA)	Babić 3' (o.g.); Wirtz 14'; Gruda 50'	Stadium: Rajko Mitić Stadium; Attendance: 2,962; Referee: Javier Alberola Rojas (Spain)

16 November 2026 2026–27 UEFA Nations League	Greece	1–0	Serbia	Volos, Greece
20:45 (21:45 UTC+2)	Masouras 69'	Report (FIFA); Report (UEFA)		Stadium: Panthessaliko Stadium; Attendance: 20,960; Referee: Michael Oliver (England)

=== 2027 ===
25 March 2027 2026–27 UEFA Nations League promotion/relegation play-offs	Hungary	v	Serbia	Hungary
20:45		Report

28 March 2027 2026–27 UEFA Nations League promotion/relegation play-offs	Serbia	v	Hungary	Serbia
18:00		Report

== Management ==
As of 12 October 2025

Coaching staff
Position	Name
Head coach	(Serbia) Veljko Paunović
Director of the A team	(Serbia) Stevan Stojanović
Assistant coach(es)	(Portugal) Nuno Gomes (South Africa) Quinton Fortune (Argentina) Claudio Arzeno (Serbia) Aleksandar Rogić
Fitness coach	(Spain) Alberto Martinez Fernandez
Goalkeeping coach	(Spain) Jesús Salvador Garrido
Analyst	(Serbia) Lazar Tomić (Serbia) Bogdan Milićević
Team manager(s)	(Serbia) Nemanja Filipović (Serbia) Dušan Gelić
Doctor(s)	(Serbia) Dejan Aleksandrić (Serbia) Ilija Rosić
Physiotherapist(s)	(Serbia) Goran Zuvić (Serbia) Dejan Bogdanović (Serbia) Viktor Vujošević (Serbia) Zoran Vujić (Serbia) Nemanja Božić
Economist(s)	(Serbia) Danijel Dragaš (Serbia) Nenad Dragaš
Security commissioner	(Serbia) Ivan Petrić
Spokesperson	(Serbia) Milan Vuković

=== Manager history ===
As of 16 November 2026

Manager	Period	Record							Major competitions
Manager	Period	Matches	Won	Drawn	Lost	Win %	Draw %	Loss %	Major competitions
(Serbia) Veljko Paunović	2025–	12	2	0	10	16.67	0.00	83.33	2026 World Cup – Failed to qualify
(Serbia) Zoran Mirković (caretaker)	2025	1	1	0	0	100.00	0.00	0.00	—
(Serbia) Dragan Stojković	2021–2025	55	26	14	15	47.27	25.45	27.27	2026 World Cup – Failed to qualify Euro 2024 – Group stage 2022 World Cup – Group stage
(Serbia) Ilija Stolica (caretaker)	2021	2	0	2	0	0.00	100	0.00	—
(Serbia) Ljubiša Tumbaković	2019–2020	14	6	5	3	42.86	35.71	21.43	Euro 2020 – Failed to qualify
(Serbia) Mladen Krstajić	2017–2019	19	9	5	5	47.36	26.32	26.32	2018 World Cup – Group stage
(Serbia) Slavoljub Muslin	2016–2017	15	8	5	2	53.33	33.33	13.33	2018 World Cup – Group stage
(Serbia) Radovan Ćurčić	2014–2016	11	5	0	6	45.45	0.00	55.55	Euro 2016 – Failed to qualify
(Netherlands) Dick Advocaat	2014	4	0	2	2	0.00	50.00	50.00	Euro 2016 – Failed to qualify
(Serbia) Ljubinko Drulović (caretaker)	2014	4	2	1	1	50.00	25.00	25.00	—
(Serbia) Siniša Mihajlović	2012–2013	19	7	4	8	36.84	21.05	42.10	2014 World Cup – Failed to qualify
(Serbia) Radovan Ćurčić (caretaker)	2011–2012	5	2	1	2	40.00	20.00	40.00	—
(Serbia) Vladimir Petrović	2010–2011	13	5	3	5	38.46	23.08	38.46	Euro 2012 – Failed to qualify
(Serbia) Radomir Antić	2008–2010	28	17	3	8	60.71	10.71	28.57	2010 World Cup – Group stage
(Serbia) Miroslav Đukić	2007–2008	5	0	2	3	0.00	40.00	60.00	—
(Spain) Javier Clemente	2006–2007	16	7	7	2	43.75	43.75	12.50	Euro 2008 – Failed to qualify
(Serbia and Montenegro) Ilija Petković	2003–2006	30	11	10	9	36.66	33.33	30.00	2006 World Cup – Group stage
(Serbia and Montenegro) Dejan Savićević	2001–2003	17	4	3	10	23.53	17.65	58.82	Euro 2004 – Failed to qualify
(Serbia and Montenegro) Boškov-Ćurković-Savićević	2001	8	4	2	2	50.00	25.00	25.00	2002 World Cup – Failed to qualify
(Serbia and Montenegro) Milovan Đorić	2001	3	0	2	1	0.00	66.67	33.33	2002 World Cup – Failed to qualify
(Serbia and Montenegro) Ilija Petković	2000–2001	4	2	1	1	50.00	25.00	25.00	—
(Serbia and Montenegro) Vujadin Boškov	1999–2000	15	6	5	4	40.00	33.33	26.67	Euro 2000 – Quarter final
(Serbia and Montenegro) Milan Živadinović	1998–1999	6	3	2	1	50.00	33.33	16.67	—
(Serbia and Montenegro) Slobodan Santrač	1994–1998	43	26	10	7	60.46	23.25	16.28	1998 World Cup – Round of 16
	TOTAL	349	153	89	107	43.84	25.50	30.66	7 out of 15

For the period before 1992 see: Yugoslavia national football team#Head coaches

== Players ==
=== Current squad ===
- The following players were called up for 2026–27 UEFA Nations League matches, against Germany and Greece.
- Caps and goals are correct as of 16 November 2026, after the match against Greece.

No.	Pos.	Player	Date of birth (age)	Caps	Goals	Club
1	GK	Đorđe Petrović	8 October 1999 (age 27)	14	0	(The Football Association) Bournemouth
12	GK	Dragan Rosić	15 November 1996 (age 30)	1	0	(Football Association of Serbia) Vojvodina
23	GK	Vanja Milinković-Savić	20 February 1997 (age 29)	24	0	(Italian Football Federation) Napoli
	GK	Filip Stanković	25 February 2002 (age 24)	2	0	(Italian Football Federation) Venezia
2	DF	Kosta Nedeljković	16 December 2005 (age 20)	16	0	(Scottish Football Association) Rangers
3	DF	Stefan Bukinac	8 July 2005 (age 21)	4	0	(Swiss Football Association) Young Boys
4	DF	Nikola Milenković (third captain)	12 October 1997 (age 29)	73	3	(The Football Association) Nottingham Forest
6	DF	Stefan Gudelj	18 May 2006 (age 20)	3	0	(Football Association of Serbia) Red Star Belgrade
13	DF	Nikola Simić	30 March 2007 (age 19)	3	0	(Football Association of Serbia) Partizan
15	DF	Srđan Babić	22 April 1996 (age 30)	15	2	(Russian Football Union) Spartak Moscow
16	DF	Strahinja Eraković	22 January 2001 (age 25)	24	1	(Turkish Football Federation) Samsunspor
18	DF	Miljan Krpić	3 July 2003 (age 23)	0	0	(Hungarian Football Federation) ETO FC
21	DF	Petar Sukačev	28 August 2005 (age 21)	3	0	(Football Association of Serbia) Vojvodina
5	MF	Nemanja Maksimović	26 January 1995 (age 31)	65	1	(United Arab Emirates Football Association) Shabab Al-Ahli
10	MF	Dušan Tadić	20 November 1988 (age 38)	117	23	(Royal Dutch Football Association) NEC
11	MF	Lazar Samardžić	24 February 2002 (age 24)	31	1	(Italian Football Federation) Atalanta
14	MF	Vasilije Kostov	11 May 2008 (age 18)	5	0	(Football Association of Serbia) Red Star Belgrade
17	MF	Stefan Džodić	15 March 2005 (age 21)	2	0	(Royal Spanish Football Federation) Almería
19	MF	Vladimir Lučić	28 June 2002 (age 24)	5	0	(Football Association of Serbia) Red Star Belgrade
20	MF	Sergej Milinković-Savić	27 February 1995 (age 31)	60	9	(Saudi Arabian Football Federation) Al-Hilal
22	MF	Saša Lukić	13 August 1996 (age 30)	67	2	(The Football Association) Ipswich Town
7	FW	Mihajlo Cvetković	10 January 2007 (age 19)	7	1	(Royal Belgian Football Association) Anderlecht
8	FW	Luka Jović	23 December 1997 (age 28)	57	12	(Hellenic Football Federation) AEK Athens
9	FW	Aleksandar Mitrović (captain)	16 September 1994 (age 32)	108	64	(Qatar Football Association) Al-Rayyan

=== Recent call-ups ===
The following players have been called up for the team within the last twelve months and are still available for selection.

Pos.	Player	Date of birth (age)	Caps	Goals	Club	Latest call-up
GK	Veljko Ilić	21 July 2003 (age 23)	1	0	(Poland) Widzew Łódź	v. Mexico, 4 June 2026
GK	Luka Lijeskić	23 February 2005 (age 21)	0	0	(Serbia) Radnički 1923	v. Mexico, 4 June 2026
GK	Predrag Rajković	31 October 1995 (age 31)	44	0	(Saudi Arabia) Al-Ittihad	v. Saudi Arabia, 31 March 2026
DF	Strahinja Pavlović	24 May 2001 (age 25)	59	5	(Italy) AC Milan	v. Germany, 13 November 2026^{INJ}
DF	Aleksa Terzić	17 August 1999 (age 27)	18	1	(Italy) Frosinone	v. Germany, 13 November 2026^{INJ}
DF	Nemanja Gudelj	16 November 1991 (age 35)	79	1	(Spain) Getafe	v. Netherlands, 4 October 2026
DF	Ognjen Mimović	17 August 2004 (age 22)	8	0	(Turkey) Fenerbahçe	v. Netherlands, 4 October 2026
DF	Lazar Nikolić	1 August 1999 (age 27)	0	0	(Serbia) Vojvodina	v. Netherlands, 27 September 2026
DF	Adem Avdić	24 September 2007 (age 19)	2	0	(Serbia) Red Star Belgrade	v. Mexico, 4 June 2026
DF	Vukašin Đurđević	24 January 2004 (age 22)	2	0	(Serbia) Partizan	v. Mexico, 4 June 2026
DF	Mirko Milikić	24 December 2001 (age 24)	1	0	(Serbia) Železničar Pančevo	v. Mexico, 4 June 2026
DF	Petar Petrović	13 July 2005 (age 21)	1	0	(Austria) Sturm Graz	v. Mexico, 4 June 2026
DF	Veljko Milosavljević	28 June 2007 (age 19)	2	0	(England) Bournemouth	v. Cape Verde, 31 May 2026^{INJ}
DF	Miloš Veljković	26 September 1995 (age 31)	39	1	(Serbia) Red Star Belgrade	v. Saudi Arabia, 31 March 2026
MF	Andrija Živković	11 July 1996 (age 30)	67	2	(Greece) PAOK	v. Greece, 16 November 2026^{SUS}
MF	Vanja Dragojević	11 January 2006 (age 20)	3	0	(Scotland) Rangers	v. Greece, 16 November 2026^{SUS}
MF	Filip Kostić	1 November 1992 (age 34)	76	3	(Netherlands) PSV	v. Germany, 13 November 2026^{INJ}
MF	Aleksandar Stanković	3 August 2005 (age 21)	10	1	(Italy) Inter Milan	v. Germany, 13 November 2026^{INJ}
MF	Veljko Birmančević	5 March 1998 (age 28)	17	0	(Hungary) Ferencváros	v. Mexico, 4 June 2026
MF	Andrija Maksimović	5 June 2007 (age 19)	9	0	(Germany) RB Leipzig	v. Mexico, 4 June 2026
MF	Njegoš Petrović	18 July 1999 (age 27)	3	0	(Serbia) Vojvodina	v. Mexico, 4 June 2026
MF	Lazar Ranđelović	5 August 1997 (age 29)	3	0	(Serbia) Vojvodina	v. Mexico, 4 June 2026
MF	Dejan Zukić	7 May 2001 (age 25)	3	0	(Serbia) Vojvodina	v. Mexico, 4 June 2026
MF	Petar Stanić	14 August 2001 (age 25)	2	1	(Bulgaria) Ludogorets Razgrad	v. Mexico, 4 June 2026
FW	Dušan Vlahović	28 January 2000 (age 26)	41	16	(Turkey) Beşiktaş	v. Germany, 13 November 2026^{WD}
FW	Dejan Joveljić	7 August 1999 (age 27)	11	2	(United States) Seattle Sounders FC	v. Netherlands, 4 October 2026
FW	Jovan Milošević	31 July 2005 (age 21)	2	0	(Portugal) Braga	v. Netherlands, 27 September 2026
FW	Nikola Štulić	8 September 2001 (age 25)	4	0	(Italy) Lecce	v. Mexico, 4 June 2026
FW	Mihailo Ivanović	29 November 2004 (age 21)	3	0	(England) Millwall	v. Mexico, 4 June 2026
FW	Petar Ratkov	18 August 2003 (age 23)	3	0	(Spain) Levante	v. Saudi Arabia, 31 March 2026
Notes: ^{INJ} = Not part of the current squad due to injury.; ^{PRE} = Preliminary squad/standby.; ^{SUS} = Not available in next match due to red card suspension.; ^{WD} = Player withdrew from the current squad due to non-injury issue.

=== Previous squads ===
FIFA World Cup squads

- 1930 FIFA World Cup squad
- 1950 FIFA World Cup squad
- 1954 FIFA World Cup squad
- 1958 FIFA World Cup squad
- 1962 FIFA World Cup squad
- 1974 FIFA World Cup squad
- 1982 FIFA World Cup squad
- 1990 FIFA World Cup squad
- 1998 FIFA World Cup squad
- 2006 FIFA World Cup squad
- 2010 FIFA World Cup squad
- 2018 FIFA World Cup squad
- 2022 FIFA World Cup squad

UEFA European Championship squads

- UEFA Euro 1960 squad
- UEFA Euro 1968 squad
- UEFA Euro 1976 squad
- UEFA Euro 1984 squad
- UEFA Euro 2000 squad
- UEFA Euro 2024 squad

== Player records ==
As of 16 November 2026
Players in bold are still active with Serbia.

=== Most capped players ===
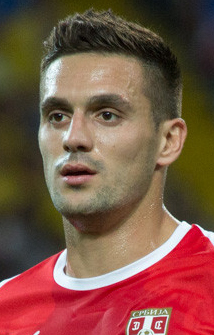
Dušan Tadić is Serbia's most-capped player with 117 appearances.

Rank	Player	Caps	Goals	Pos.	Career
1	**Dušan Tadić**	117	23	MF	2008–present
2	**Aleksandar Mitrović**	108	64	FW	2013–present
3	Branislav Ivanović	105	13	DF	2005–2018
4	Dejan Stanković	103	15	MF	1998–2013
5	Savo Milošević	102	37	FW	1994–2008
6	Aleksandar Kolarov	94	11	DF	2008–2020
7	Dragan Džajić	85	23	MF	1964–1979
8	Dragan Stojković	84	15	MF	1983–2001
8	Vladimir Stojković	84	0	GK	2006–2018
10	**Nemanja Gudelj**	79	1	MF	2014–present

=== Top goalscorers ===
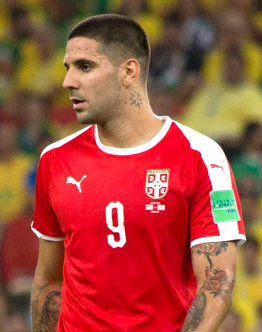
Aleksandar Mitrović is Serbia's top goalscorer with 64 goals.

Rank	Player	Goals	Caps	Ratio	Career
1	**Aleksandar Mitrović** (list)	64	108	0.59	2013–present
2	Stjepan Bobek	38	63	0.6	1946–1956
3	Milan Galić	37	51	0.73	1959–1965
3	Blagoje Marjanović	37	58	0.64	1926–1938
3	Savo Milošević	37	102	0.36	1994–2008
6	Rajko Mitić	32	59	0.54	1946–1957
7	Dušan Bajević	29	37	0.78	1970–1977
8	Todor Veselinović	28	37	0.76	1953–1961
9	Predrag Mijatović	27	73	0.37	1989–2003
10	Borivoje Kostić	26	33	0.79	1956–1964

=== Captains (since 1994) ===
Player	Period	Tournaments as the captain
Dragan Stojković	1994–2001	1998 FIFA World Cup, UEFA Euro 2000
Predrag Mijatović	2001–2003	—
Savo Milošević	2003–2006	2006 FIFA World Cup
Dejan Stanković	2006–2011	2010 FIFA World Cup
Nikola Žigić	2011	—
Branislav Ivanović	2012–2017	—
Aleksandar Kolarov	2018–2020	2018 FIFA World Cup
Dušan Tadić	2021–2024	2022 FIFA World Cup, UEFA Euro 2024
Aleksandar Mitrović	2024–	—

== Notable players ==
Goalkeepers

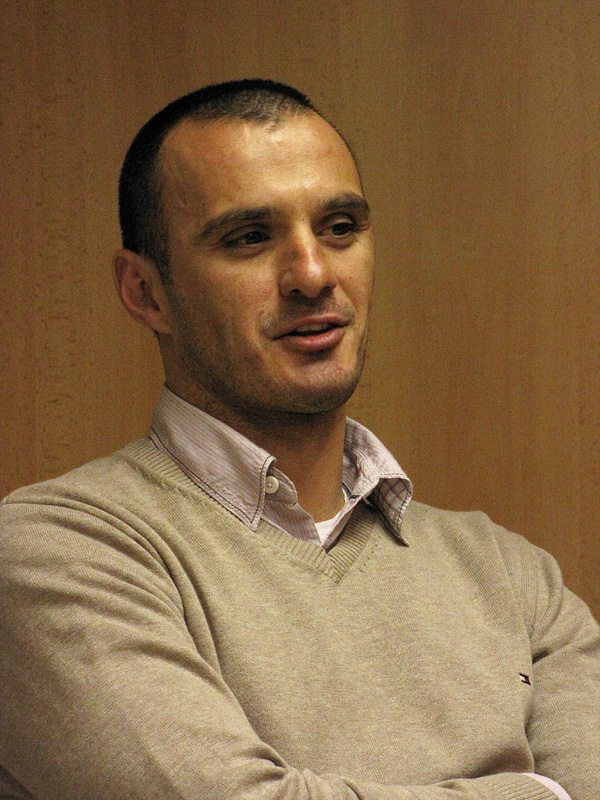
Ivica Kralj played for the team from 1996 to 2001

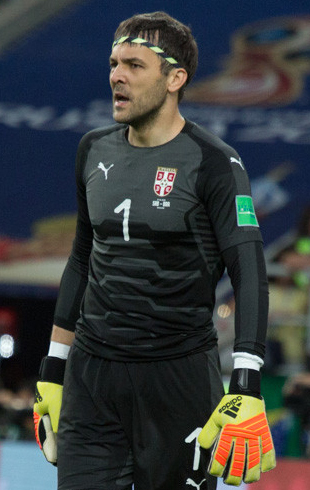
Vladimir Stojković is the most capped goalkeeper in the team's history with 84 caps

Defenders

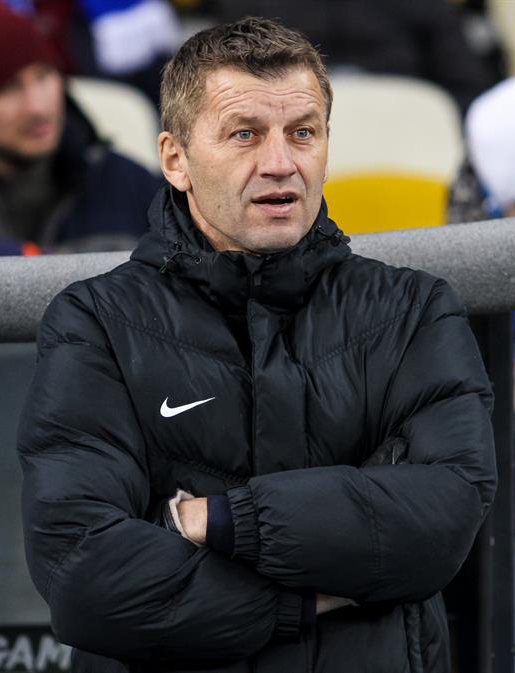
Miroslav Đukić played for the team from 1991 to 2001

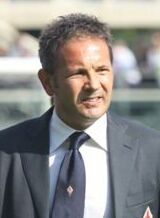
Siniša Mihajlović played 63 matches for the team from 1993 to 2003 and managed the team in 2014 FIFA World Cup qualification

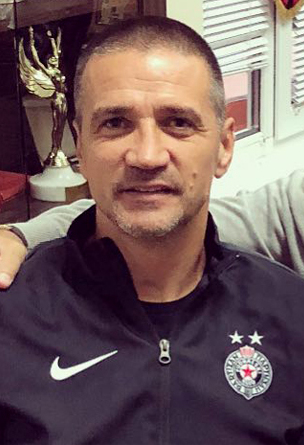
Zoran Mirković played for the team from 1995 to 2003

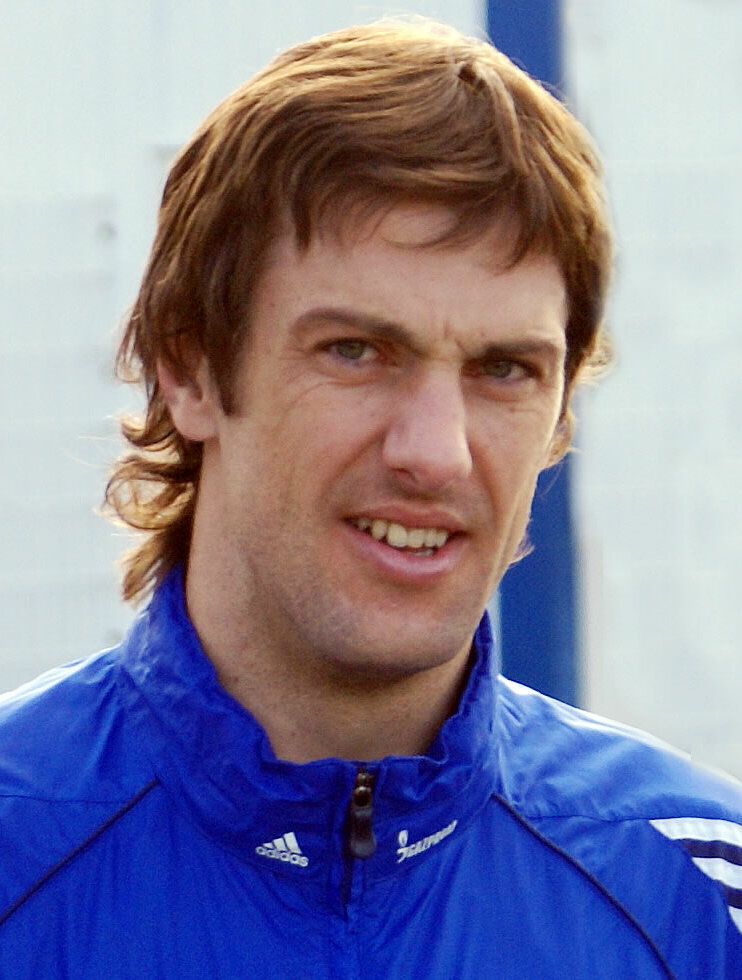
Mladen Krstajić played 59 matches for the team from 1999 to 2008 and managed the team at the 2018 World Cup

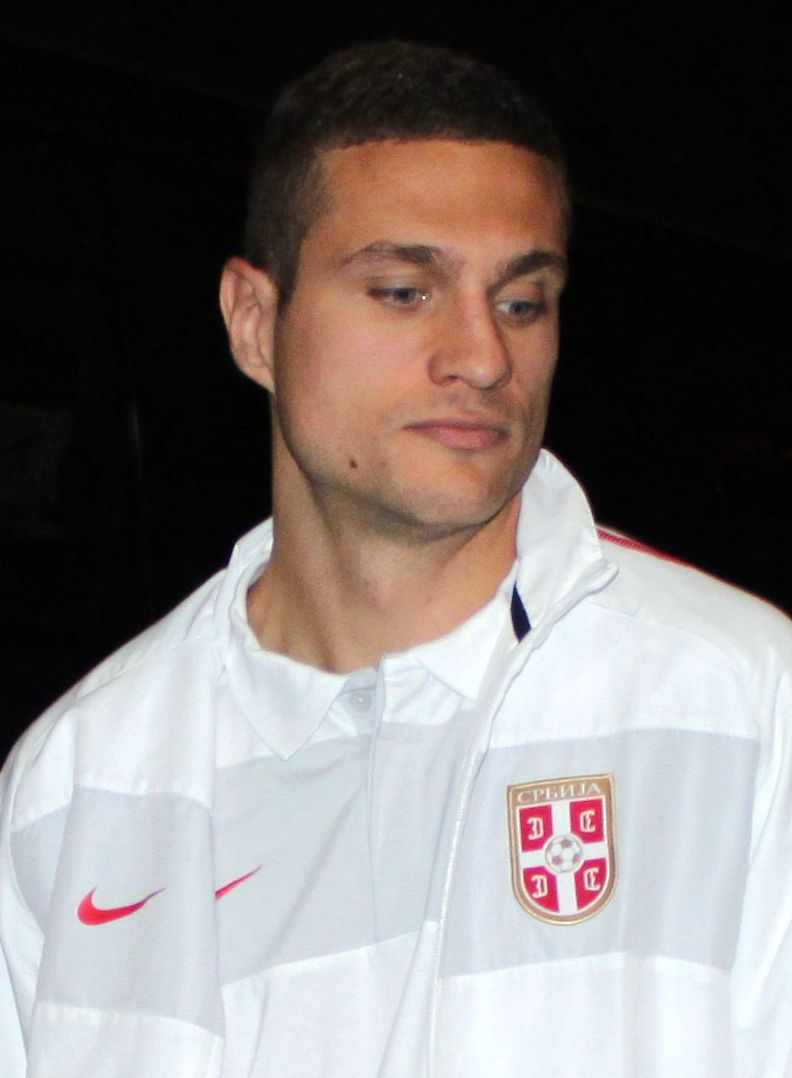
Nemanja Vidić played 56 matches, was a participant in two World Cups and named twice in the FIFA World XI

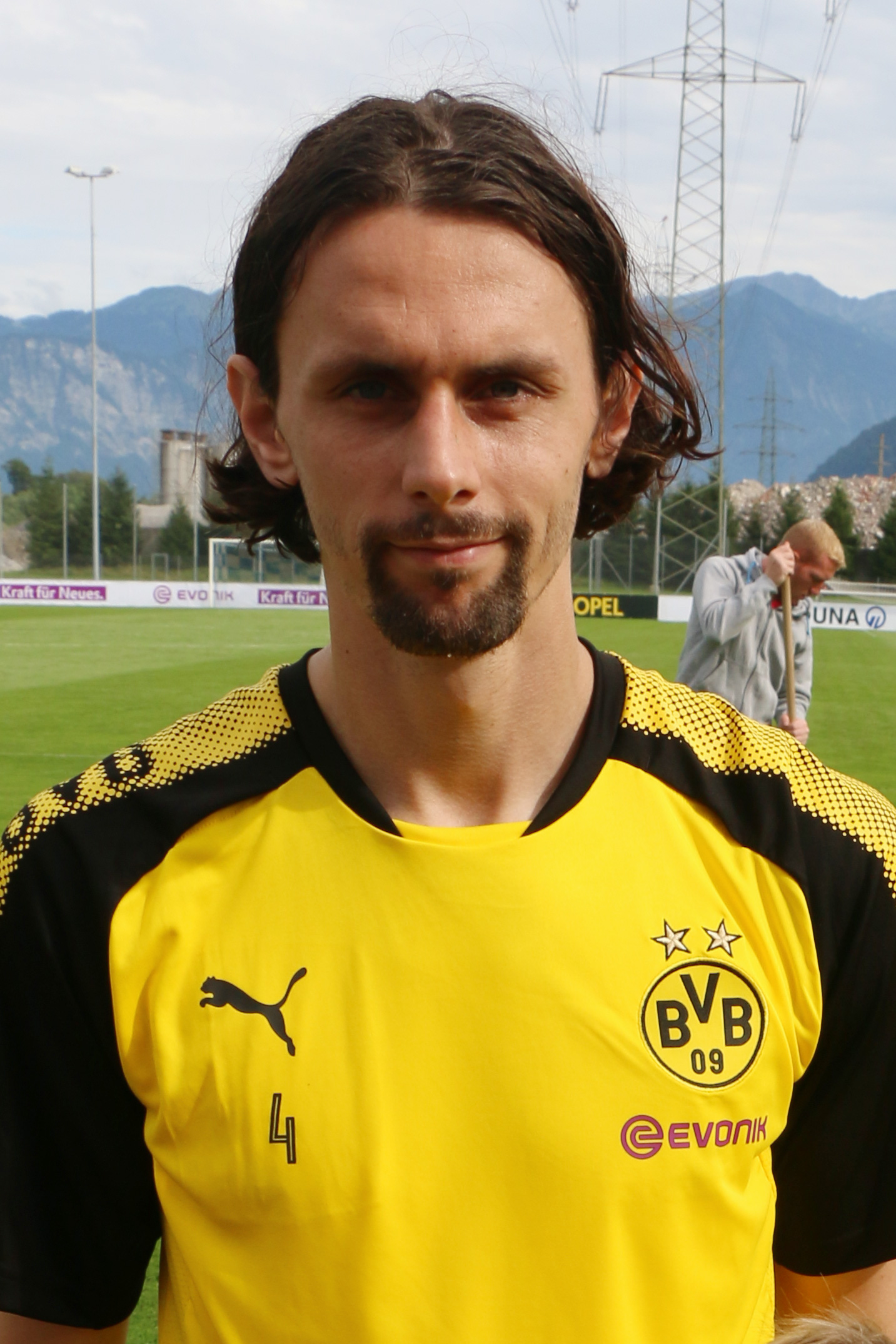
Neven Subotić played 36 matches, was a participant at the 2010 World Cup

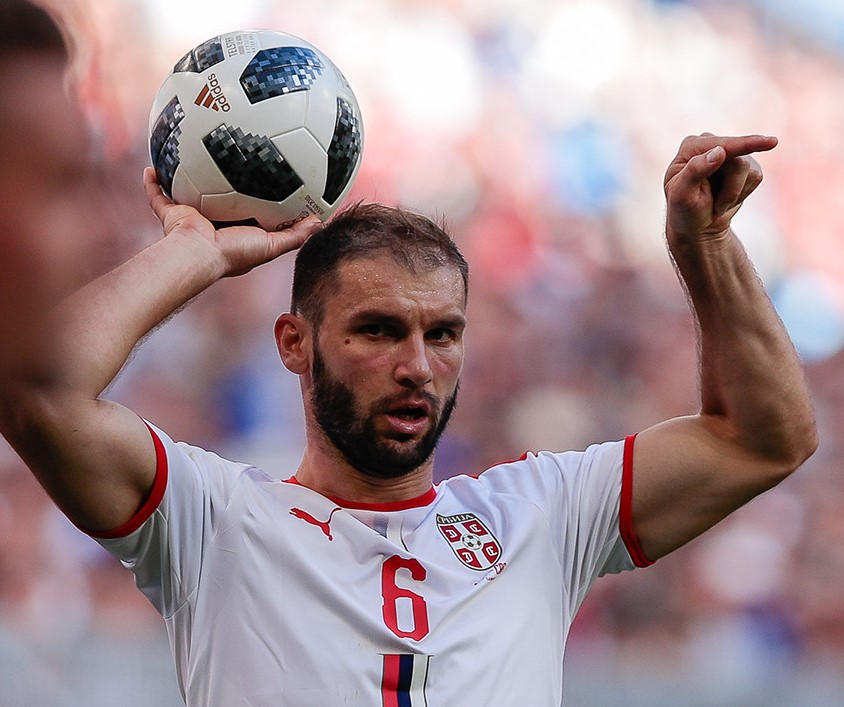
Branislav Ivanović played 105 matches for the team from 2005 to 2018

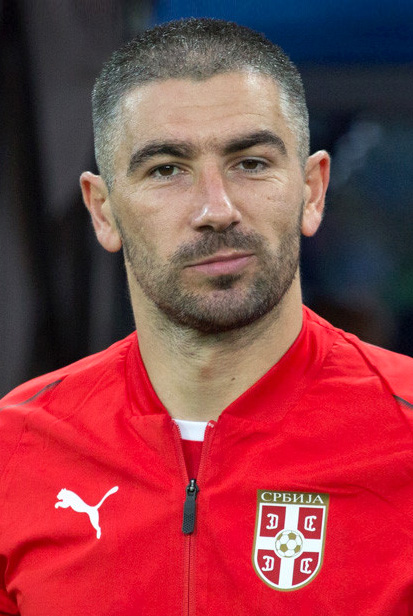
Aleksandar Kolarov played 94 matches and captained the team at the 2018 World Cup

Midfielders

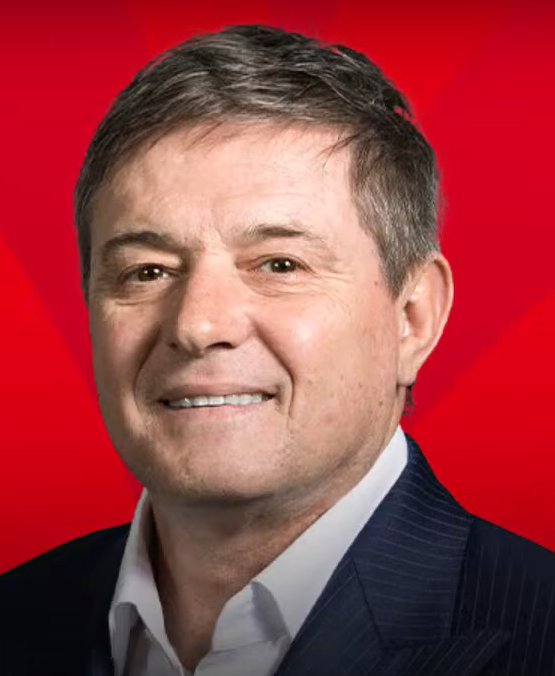
Dragan Stojković played from 1983 to 2001 for the team, and managed the team from 2021 to 2025

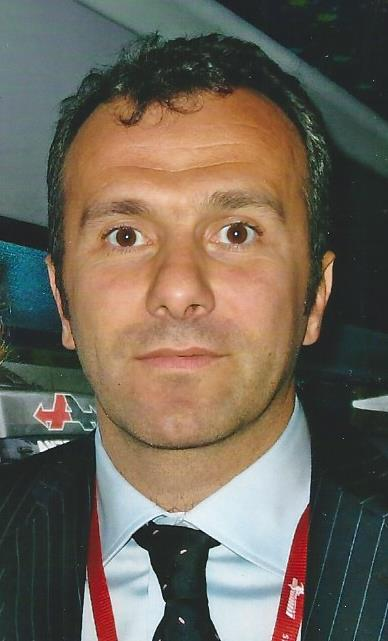
Dejan Savićević played for the team from 1986 to 1999 and managed the team from 2001 to 2003

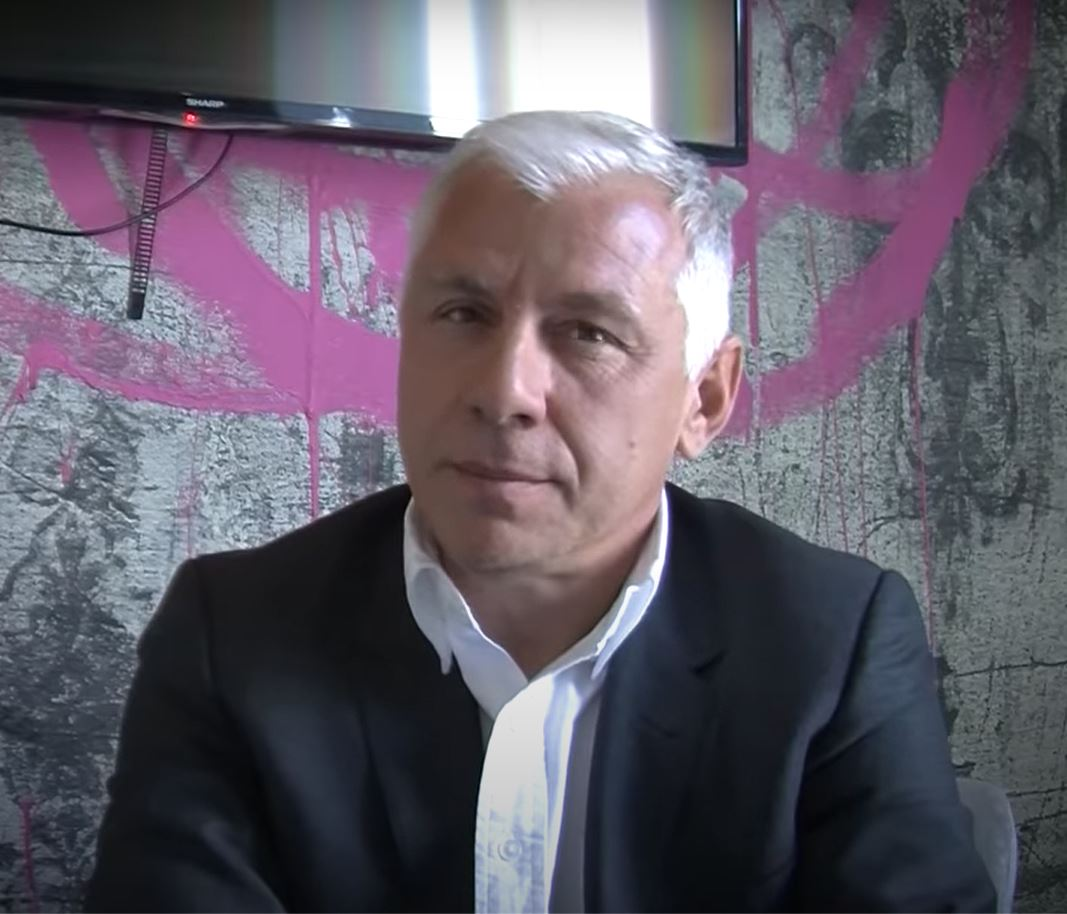
Vladimir Jugović played for the team from 1991 to 2002

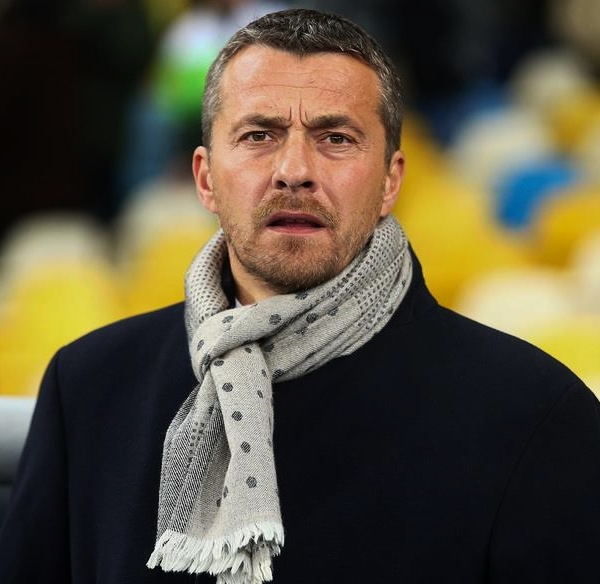
Slaviša Jokanović played for the team from 1991 to 2002

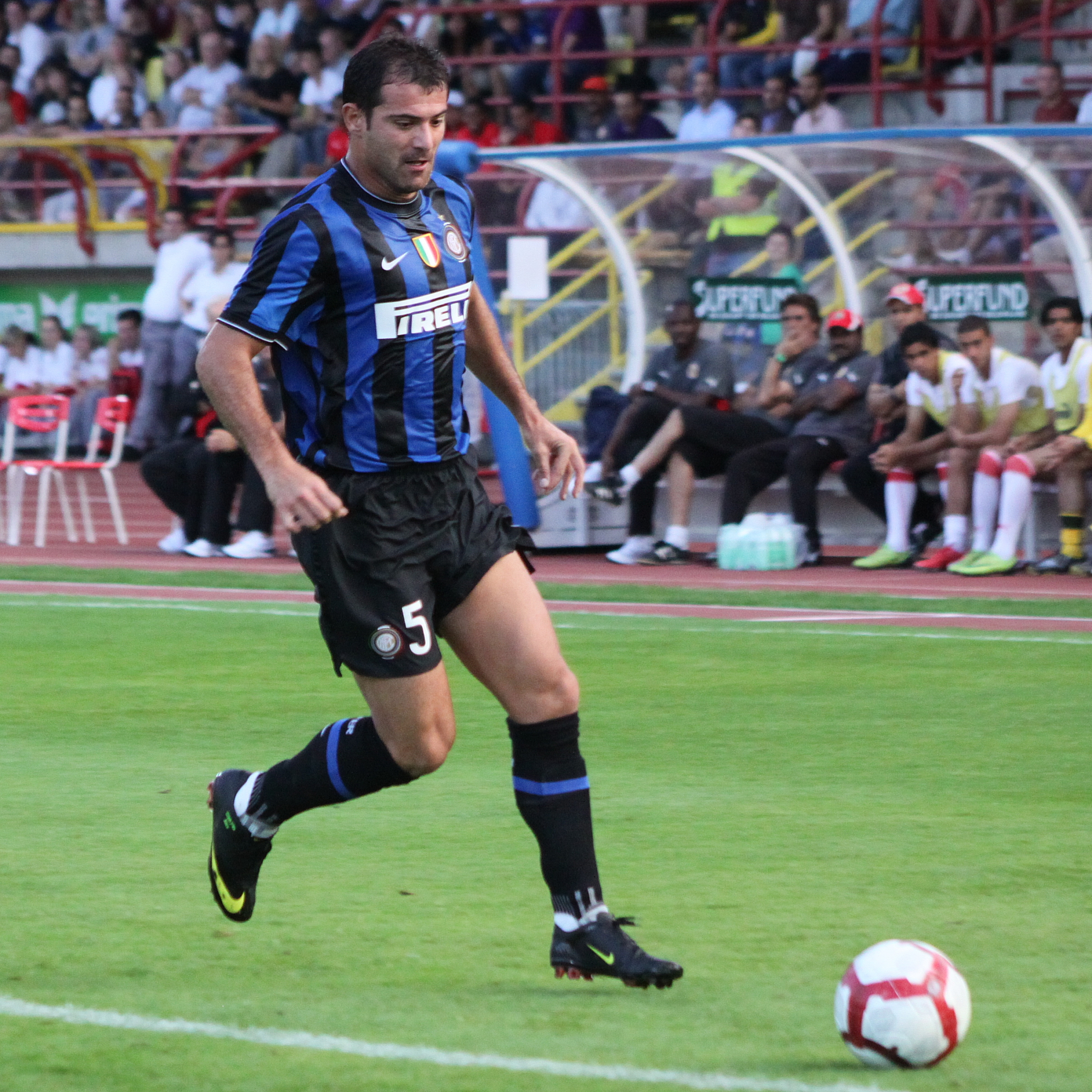
Dejan Stanković is the Serbian player who won the most trophies; he played in three World Cups and one European Championship

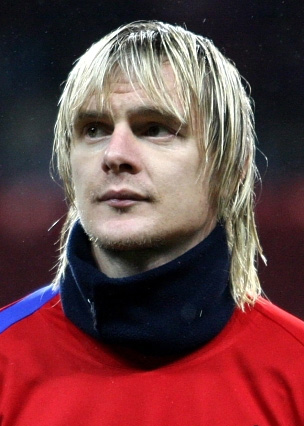
Miloš Krasić played for the team from 2006 to 2011

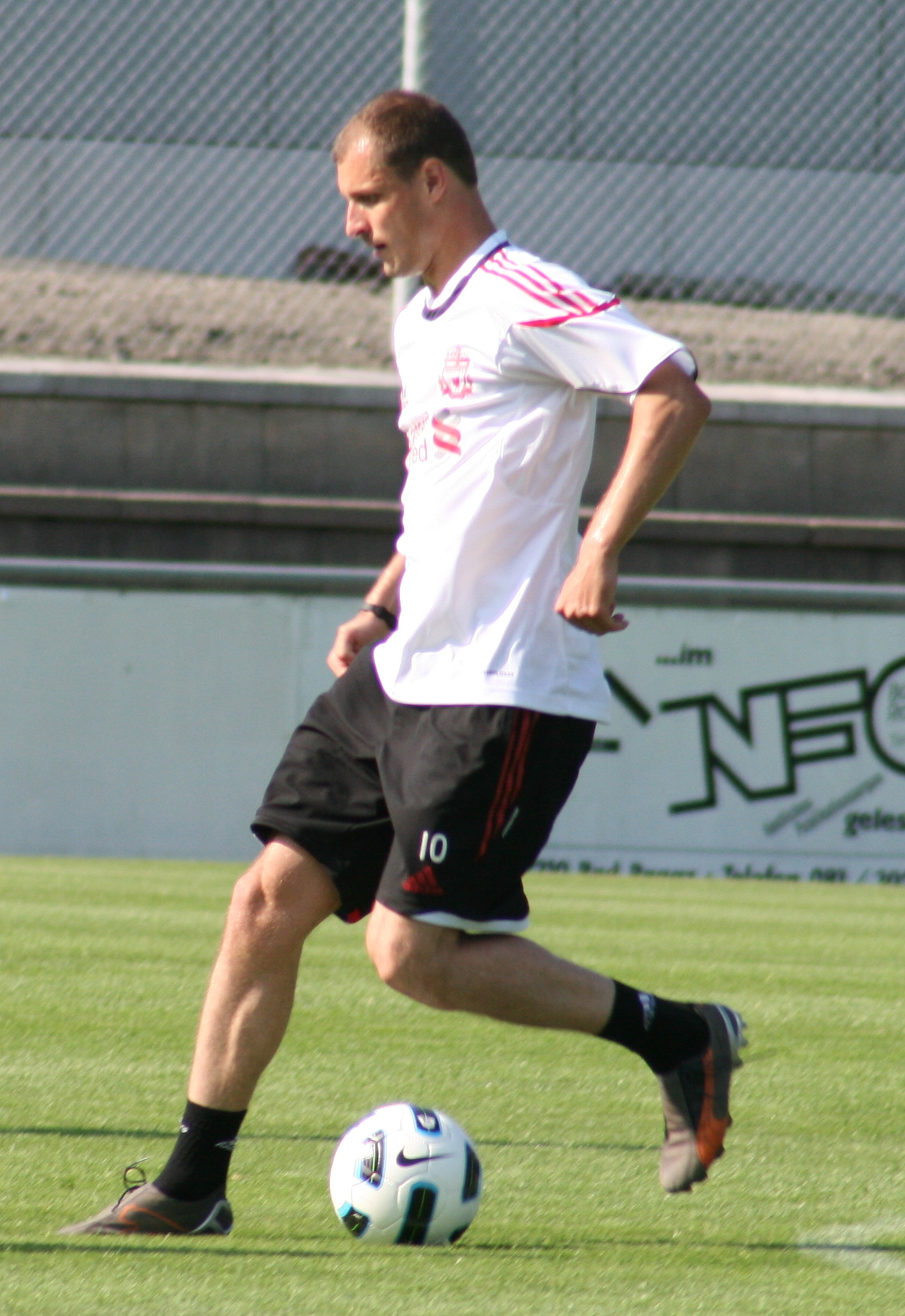
Milan Jovanović played for the team from 2007 to 2012

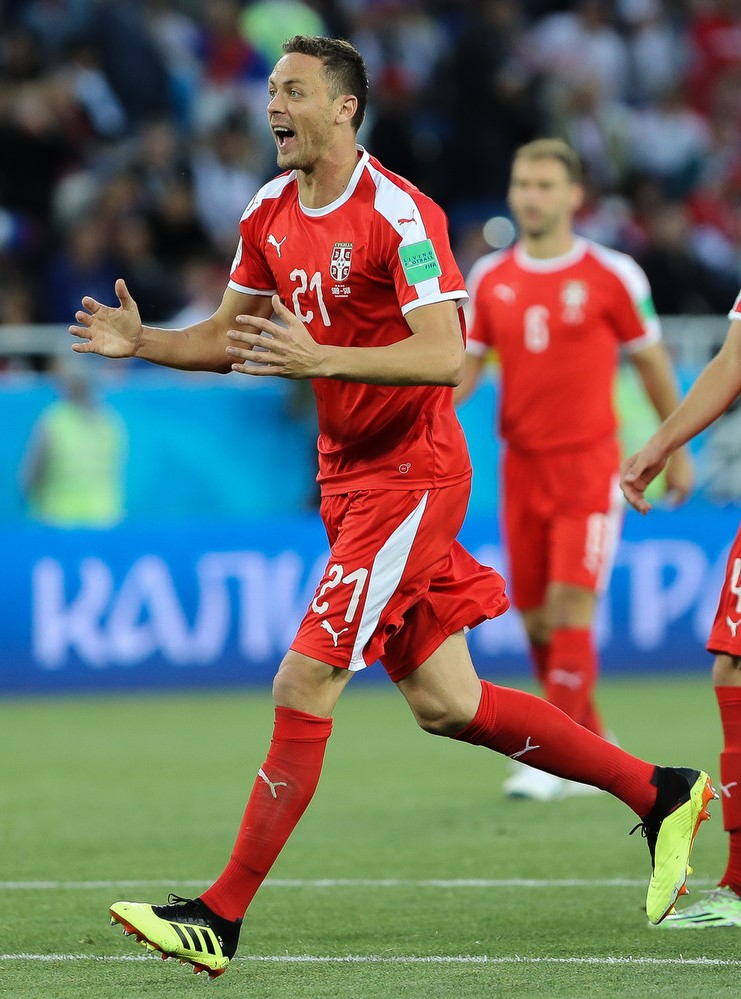
Nemanja Matić played for the team from 2008 to 2019

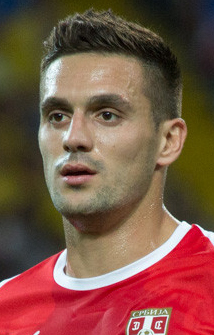
Dušan Tadić is the most capped player in the team's history with 117 caps from 2008 to 2026

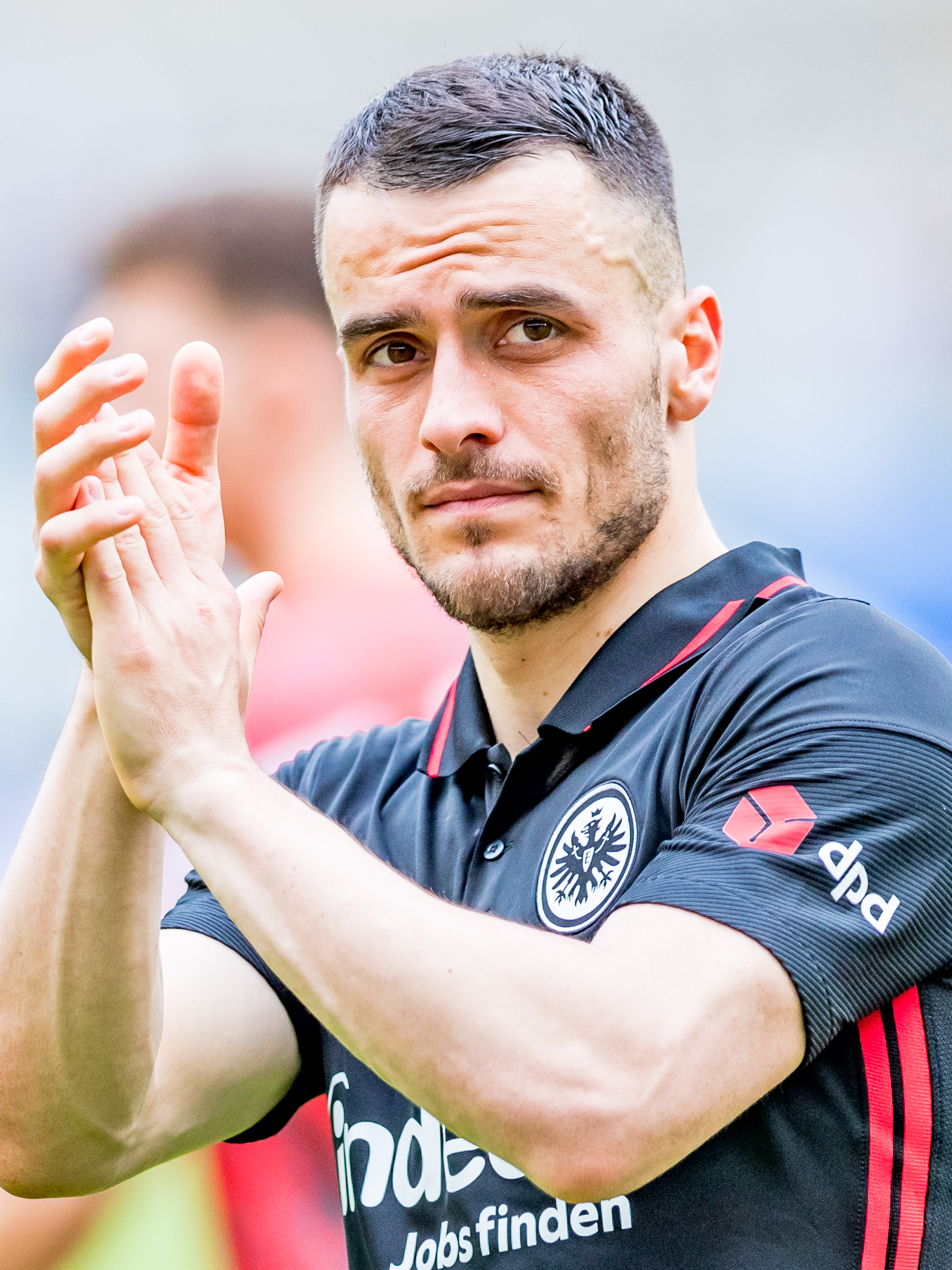
Filip Kostić has been playing for the team since 2015

Forwards

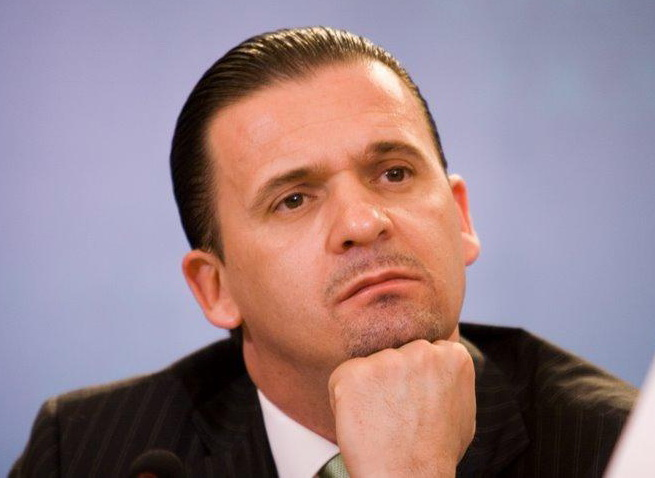
Predrag Mijatović was a top goalscorer in 1998 World Cup qualifiers with 14 goals

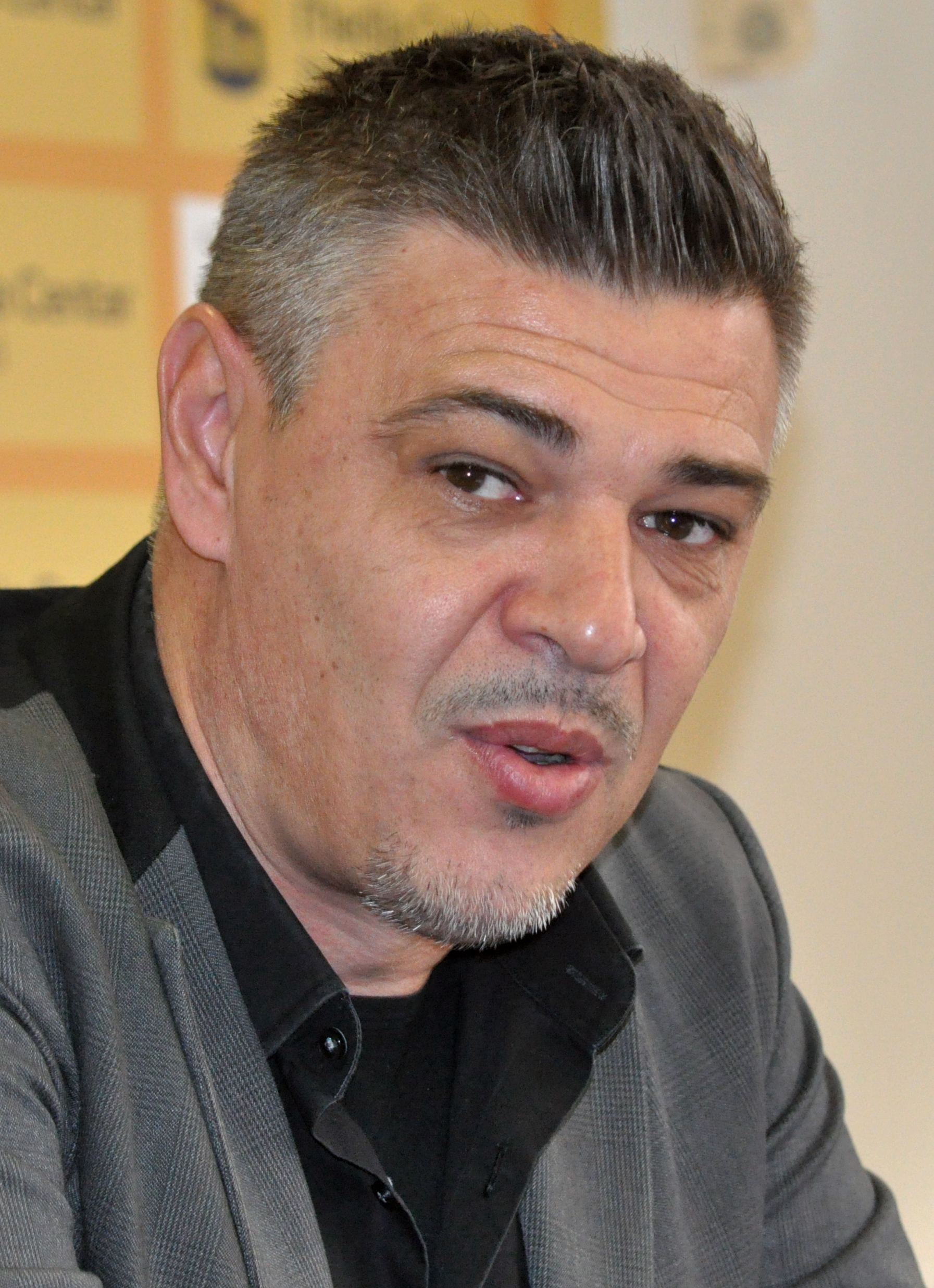
Savo Milošević played 102 matches, scored 37 goals and was UEFA Euro 2000 Golden Boot

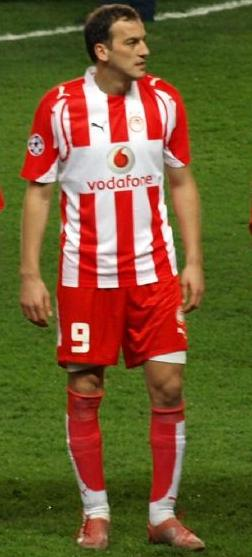
Darko Kovačević played 59 matches and scored 10 goals between 1994 and 2004

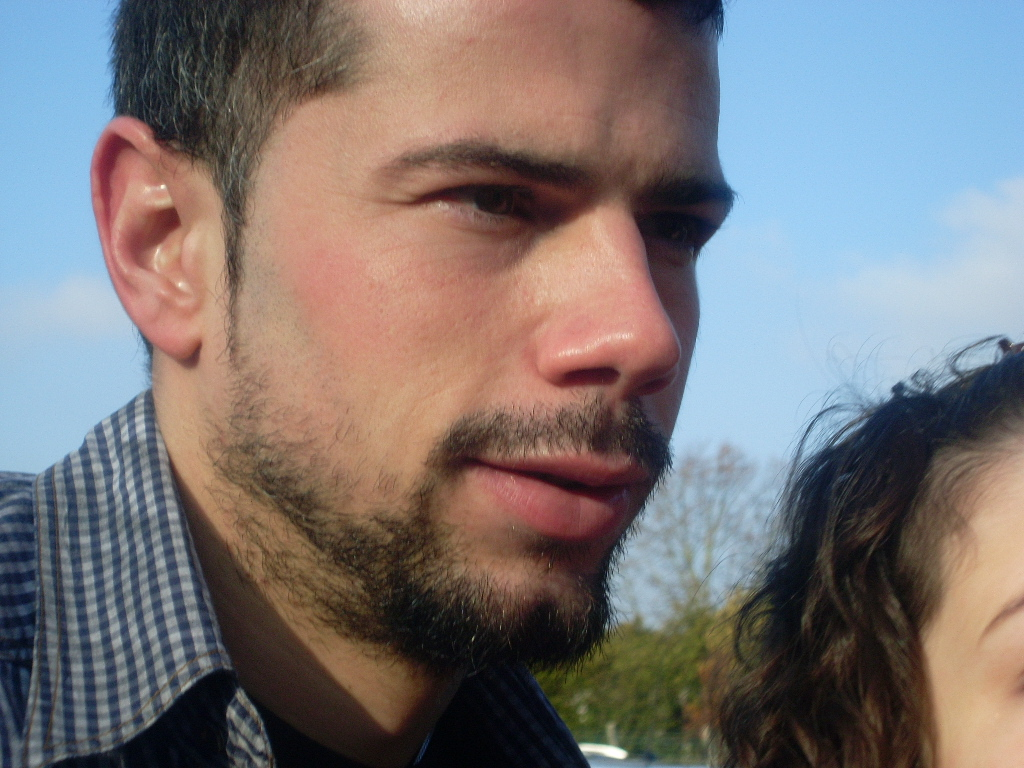
Mateja Kežman was the top goal scorer for the team in 2006 FIFA World Cup qualification

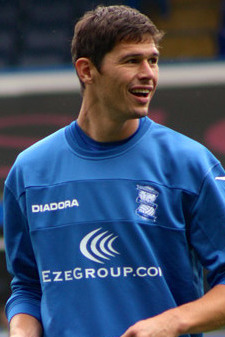
Nikola Žigić played 57 matches and scored 20 goals between 2004 and 2011

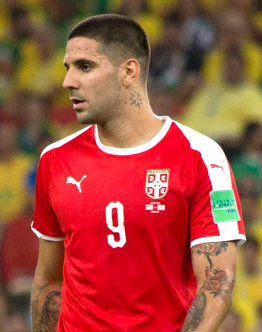
Aleksandar Mitrović is top goal scorer in the history of national team, and was 2018–19 and 2022–23 UEFA Nations League top goalscorer

== Competitive record ==
Serbia was part of Yugoslavia and its national football team which existed between 1920 and 1992. With the collapse of Yugoslavia, the remaining constituent republics, Serbia and Montenegro, formed the Federal Republic of Yugoslavia in 1992. The country underwent a name change in 2003, and Montenegro left the state union in 2006. FIFA and UEFA consider the Football Association of Serbia a direct successor to both the Football Association of Yugoslavia and the Football Association of Serbia and Montenegro, thereby attributing all records to Serbia.

=== FIFA World Cup ===
FIFA World Cup record									Qualification record					
Year	Round	Position	Pld	W	D	L	GF	GA	Pld	W	D	L	GF	GA
as part of Yugoslavia
(Uruguay) 1930	Fourth place	4th	3	2	0	1	7	7	Invited					
(Italy) 1934	Did not qualify								2	0	1	1	3	4
(France) 1938	Did not qualify								2	1	0	1	1	4
(Brazil) 1950	Group stage	5th	3	2	0	1	7	3	5	3	2	0	16	6
(Switzerland) 1954	Quarter-finals	7th	3	1	1	1	2	3	4	4	0	0	4	0
(Sweden) 1958	Quarter-finals	5th	4	1	2	1	7	7	4	2	2	0	7	2
(Chile) 1962	Fourth place	4th	6	3	0	3	10	7	4	3	1	0	11	4
(England) 1966	Did not qualify								6	3	1	2	10	8
(Mexico) 1970	Did not qualify								6	3	1	2	19	7
(West Germany) 1974	Quarter-finals (Note: Last 8 held as second group stage.)	7th	6	1	2	3	12	7	5	3	2	0	8	4
(Argentina) 1978	Did not qualify								4	1	0	3	6	8
(Spain) 1982	Group stage	16th	3	1	1	1	2	2	8	6	1	1	22	7
(Mexico) 1986	Did not qualify								8	3	2	3	7	8
(Italy) 1990	Quarter-finals	5th	5	3	1	1	8	6	8	6	2	0	16	6
as part of FR Yugoslavia / Serbia and Montenegro
(United States) 1994	Suspended (Note: Draw for 1994 FIFA World Cup qualifiers was made on 8 December 1991, however due to break-up of Socialist Federal Republic of Yugoslavia and consequent military conflict, which broke in early 1991, FSJ ceased to exist as football organization of the SFR Yugoslavia. Organization that remained based in Belgrade, Serbia, was excluded from taking part as FSJ or its successor due to UN sanctions.)								0	0	0	0	0	0
(France) 1998	Round of 16	10th	4	2	1	1	5	4	12	9	2	1	41	8
(South Korea) (Japan) 2002	Did not qualify								10	5	4	1	22	8
(Germany) 2006	Group stage	32nd	3	0	0	3	2	10	10	6	4	0	16	1
as Serbia
(South Africa) 2010	Group stage	23rd	3	1	0	2	2	3	10	7	1	2	22	8
(Brazil) 2014	Did not qualify								10	4	2	4	18	11
(Russia) 2018	Group stage	23rd	3	1	0	2	2	4	10	6	3	1	20	10
(Qatar) 2022	Group stage	29th	3	0	1	2	5	8	8	6	2	0	18	9
(Canada) (Mexico) (United States) 2026	Did not qualify								8	4	1	3	9	10
(Morocco) (Portugal) (Spain) 2030	To be determined								To be determined					
(Saudi Arabia) 2034	To be determined								To be determined					
Total	Fourth place	13/23	49	18	9	22	71	71	144	85	34	25	296	133

Serbia's World Cup record
First match	(Kingdom of Yugoslavia) Yugoslavia 2–1 Brazil (14 July 1930; Montevideo, Uruguay)
Biggest Win	Yugoslavia 9–0 Zaire (7 June 1974; Gelsenkirchen, West Germany)
Biggest Defeat	Argentina 6–0 Serbia and Montenegro (16 June 2006; Gelsenkirchen, Germany)
Best Result	Fourth place in 1930 and 1962
Worst Result	Group stage in 1950, 1982, 2006, 2010, 2018, and 2022

=== UEFA European Championship ===
UEFA European Championship record									Qualification record					
Year	Round	Position	Pld	W	D	L	GF	GA	Pld	W	D	L	GF	GA
as part of Yugoslavia
(France) 1960	Runners-up	2nd	2	1	0	1	6	6	4	2	1	1	9	4
(Spain) 1964	Did not qualify								4	2	1	1	6	5
(Italy) 1968	Runners-up	2nd	3	1	1	1	2	3	6	4	1	1	14	5
(Belgium) 1972	Did not qualify								8	3	4	1	7	5
(Socialist Federal Republic of Yugoslavia) 1976	Fourth place	4th	2	0	0	2	4	7	8	6	1	1	15	5
(Italy) 1980	Did not qualify								6	4	0	2	14	6
(France) 1984	Group stage	8th	3	0	0	3	2	10	6	3	2	1	12	11
(West Germany) 1988	Did not qualify								6	4	0	2	13	9
(Sweden) 1992	Qualified, but suspended								8	7	0	1	24	4
as part of FR Yugoslavia / Serbia and Montenegro
(England) 1996	Suspended								Suspended					
(Belgium) (Netherlands) 2000	Quarter-finals	8th	4	1	1	2	8	13	8	5	2	1	18	8
(Portugal) 2004	Did not qualify								8	3	3	2	11	11
as Serbia
(Austria) (Switzerland) 2008	Did not qualify								14	6	6	2	22	11
(Poland) (Ukraine) 2012	Did not qualify								10	4	3	3	13	12
(France) 2016	Did not qualify								8	2	1	5	8	13
(Europe) 2020	Did not qualify								10	5	3	2	20	19
(Germany) 2024	Group stage	19th	3	0	2	1	1	2	8	4	2	2	15	9
(United Kingdom) (Republic of Ireland) 2028	To be determined								To be determined					
(Italy) (Turkey) 2032	To be determined								To be determined					
Total	Runners-up	7/17	17	3	4	10	23	41	122	64	30	28	221	137

Serbia's European Championship record
First match	France 4–5 Yugoslavia (Paris, France; 6 July 1960)
Biggest win	France 4–5 Yugoslavia (Paris, France; 6 July 1960); Yugoslavia 1–0 England (Florence, Italy; 5 June 1968); Norway 0–1 FR Yugoslavia (Liège, Belgium; 18 June 2000)
Biggest defeat	Denmark 5–0 Yugoslavia (Lyon, France; 16 June 1984); Netherlands 6–1 FR Yugoslavia (Rotterdam, Netherlands; 25 June 2000)
Best Result	Runners-up in 1960 and 1968
Worst Result	Group stage in 1984 and 2024

=== UEFA Nations League ===
UEFA Nations League record
Season	Division	Group	Pld	W	D	L	GF	GA	P/R	RK
2018–19	C	4	6	4	2	0	11	4	▲	27th
2020–21	B	3	6	1	3	2	9	7	Same position	27th
2022–23	B	4	6	4	1	1	13	5	▲	19th
2024–25	A	4	6	1	3	2	3	6	Same position	9th
2024–25	A	Relegation play-off	2	1	1	0	3	1	Same position	9th
2026–27	A	2	6	0	0	6	4	12	TBD	14th
2026–27	A	Relegation play-off	0	0	0	0	0	0	TBD	14th
Total			32	11	10	11	43	35	9th	

Serbia's Nations League record
First match	Lithuania 0–1 Serbia (Vilnius, Lithuania; 7 September 2018)
Biggest Win	Serbia 5–0 Russia (Belgrade, Serbia; 18 November 2020)
Biggest Defeat	Spain 3–0 Serbia (Córdoba, Spain; 15 October 2024)
Best Result	10th in 2024–25
Worst Result	27th in 2018–19 and 2020–21

== Head-to-head records (2006 onwards) ==
As of 16 November 2026

Opponent	Pld	W	D	L	GF	GA	GD	Competitive matches (Note: Legend: "W" – FIFA World Cup match; "E" – UEFA European Championship match; "N" – UEFA Nations League Finals match; "Q" – qualifying match or UEFA Nations League group stage match; In each final tournament of the World Cup, the European Championship and the Nations League (shown in bold), Serbia has played one match against the respective opponent, while in each qualifying tournament and each Nations League group stage, it has played two matches against the respective opponent. Friendly matches and minor tournaments are counted in the table but are not shown in this column.)
Albania	4	1	1	2 (Note: The Serbia v Albania match was abandoned with the score at 0–0 in the 42nd minute after "various incidents", which resulted in the Albania players refusing to return to the field. UEFA ruled that not only Albania had forfeited the match and awarded a 3–0 win to Serbia, but also deducted three points from Serbia for their involvement in the events. Serbia also had to play their next two home qualifying games behind closed doors, and both the Serbian and Albanian FAs were fined €100,000. The decision was appealed by both Serbia and Albania, but the decision was upheld by UEFA. Both associations then filed further appeals to the Court of Arbitration for Sport, and on 10 July 2015, the Court of Arbitration for Sport rejected the appeal filed by the Serbian FA, and upheld in part the appeal filed by the Albanian FA, meaning the match is deemed to have been forfeited by Serbia with 0–3 and they are still deducted three points.)	2	4	–2	2016 EQ; 2026 WQ
Algeria	1	1	0	0	3	0	+3	
Andorra	2	2	0	0	6	1	+5	2026 WQ
Armenia	5	3	2	0	8	1	+7	2008 EQ; 2016 EQ
Australia	2	0	1	1	1	2	–1	2010 W
Austria	7	4	1	2	13	9	+4	2010 WQ; 2018 WQ; 2024–25 NQ
Azerbaijan	5	5	0	0	16	4	+12	2008 EQ; 2022 WQ
Bahrain	1	1	0	0	5	1	+4	
Belgium	5	1	0	4	4	9	–5	2008 EQ; 2014 WQ
Bolivia	1	1	0	0	5	1	+4	
Brazil	3	0	0	3	0	5	–5	2018 W 2022 W
Bulgaria	4	2	2	0	10	4	+6	2024 EQ
Cameroon	2	1	1	0	7	6	+1	2022 W
Cape Verde	1	0	0	1	0	3	–3	
Chile	2	1	0	1	3	2	+1	
China	1	1	0	0	2	0	+2	
Colombia	1	0	0	1	0	1	–1	
Costa Rica	1	1	0	0	1	0	+1	2018 W
Croatia	2	0	1	1	1	3	–2	2014 WQ
Cyprus	5	4	1	0	8	2	+6	
Czech Republic	2	1	0	1	4	5	–1	
Denmark	6	0	2	4	1	10	–9	2016 EQ; 2024 E 2024–25 NQ
Dominican Republic	1	0	1	0	0	0	0	
England	3	0	0	3	0	8	–8	2024 E 2026 WQ
Estonia	3	1	1	1	3	4	–1	2012 EQ
Faroe Islands	4	4	0	0	10	1	+9	2010 WQ; 2012 EQ
Finland	2	1	1	0	2	0	+2	2008 EQ
France	5	0	2	3	4	8	–4	2010 WQ
Georgia	2	2	0	0	4	1	+3	2018 WQ
Germany	5	1	1	3	4	8	–4	2010 W 2025–26 NQ; 2026–27 NQ
Ghana	1	0	0	1	0	1	–1	2010 W
Greece	4	1	0	3	3	4	–1	2025–26 NQ; 2026–27 NQ
Honduras	1	0	0	1	0	2	–2	
Hungary	5	1	1	3	4	6	–2	2020–21 NQ; 2024 EQ
Israel	2	2	0	0	5	1	+4	
Italy	2	0	1	1 (Note: The Italy v Serbia match was abandoned after six minutes due to rioting by Serbian fans. The UEFA Control and Disciplinary Body awarded the match as a 3–0 forfeit win to Italy.)	1	4	–3	2012 EQ
Jamaica	2	1	1	0	3	2	+1	
Japan	3	2	0	1	5	1	+4	
Jordan	1	1	0	0	3	2	+1	
Kazakhstan	2	1	0	1	2	2	0	2008 EQ
Latvia	2	2	0	0	3	1	+2	2026 WQ
Lithuania	8	7	0	1	20	6	+14	2010 WQ; 2018–19 NQ; 2020 EQ; 2024 EQ
Luxembourg	4	4	0	0	11	4	+7	2020 EQ; 2022 WQ
Morocco	1	0	0	1	1	2	–1	
Moldova	2	2	0	0	6	0	+6	2018 WQ
Mexico	2	0	0	2	1	7	–6	
Montenegro	4	4	0	0	9	2	+7	2018–19 NQ; 2024 EQ
Netherlands	2	0	0	2	2	4	–1	2025–26 NQ
Nigeria	1	1	0	0	2	0	+2	
North Macedonia	3	1	1	1	6	3	+3	2014 WQ
Northern Ireland	3	3	0	0	4	1	+3	2012 EQ
Norway	4	2	1	1	5	3	+2	2020 EQ; 2022–23 NQ
New Zealand	1	0	0	1	0	1	–1	
Panama	2	0	2	0	1	1	0	
Paraguay	1	1	0	0	1	0	+1	
Poland	5	0	3	2	3	5	–2	2008 EQ
Portugal	8	1	4	3	11	14	–3	2008 EQ; 2016 EQ; 2020 EQ; 2022 WQ
Qatar	3	2	0	1	8	3	+5	
Republic of Ireland	7	3	4	0	10	7	+3	2018 WQ; 2022 WQ
Romania	4	2	2	0	10	4	+6	2010 WQ; 2018–19 NQ
Russia	7	1	2	4	9	12	–3	2020–21 NQ
Saudi Arabia	1	1	0	0	2	1	+1	
Scotland	3	1	2	0	3	1	+2	2014 WQ; 2020 EQ
Slovenia	5	1	3	1	8	6	+2	2012 EQ; 2022–23 NQ; 2024 E
South Africa	1	1	0	0	3	1	+2	
South Korea	3	1	1	1	3	3	0	
Spain	4	0	1	3	0	8	–8	2024–25 NQ
Sweden	5	4	0	1	11	3	+8	2022–23 NQ
Switzerland	4	1	1	2	6	6	0	2018 W 2022 W 2024–25 NQ
Turkey	2	0	2	0	2	2	0	2020–21 NQ
Ukraine	5	0	1	4	2	12	–10	2020 EQ
United States	2	1	1	0	2	1	+1	
Wales	4	2	2	0	11	3	+8	2014 WQ; 2018 WQ
Total (73)	224	97	54	73	329	255	+74	

== Honours ==
=== Global ===
- Olympic Games
  - Gold medal: 1960
  - Silver medal: 1948, 1952, 1956
  - Bronze medal: 1984

=== Continental ===
- UEFA European Championship
  - Runners-up: 1960, 1968

=== Regional ===
- Balkan Cup
  - Champions: 1934–35, 1935
- Mediterranean Games
  - Gold medal: 1971, 1979

=== Friendly ===
- 1945 Yugoslav Football Tournament
  - Champions: 1945
- Lunar New Year Cup
  - Champions: 1995
- Millennium Super Cup
  - Champions: 2001
- Korea Cup
  - Runners-up: 1997
- Kirin Cup
  - Runners-up: 2004

=== Awards ===
- FIFA Best Mover of the Year: 1997

=== Summary ===
Competition	1st place, gold medalist(s)	2nd place, silver medalist(s)	3rd place, bronze medalist(s)	Total
Olympic Games	1	3	1	5
UEFA European Championship	0	2	0	2
Total	1	5	1	7

== See also ==
- Serbia national football team results
- Serbia and Montenegro national football team results
- Serbia national under-21 football team
- Serbia national under-20 football team
- Serbia national under-19 football team
- Serbia national under-17 football team
- List of Serbia international footballers (including predecessor teams)
- Yugoslavia national football team
- Serbia and Montenegro national football team
