= List of international goals scored by Aleksandar Mitrović =

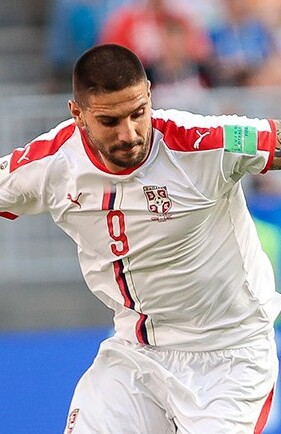
Mitrović playing for Serbia at the 2018 FIFA World Cup

Aleksandar Mitrović is a Serbian professional footballer who has represented the Serbia national team as a forward since his debut on 7 June 2013 in a 2014 FIFA World Cup qualification match against Belgium. On 6 September 2013, he scored his first international goal in a 2014 FIFA World Cup qualification match against Croatia, in what was his third international appearance. Since then, he has become Serbia's all-time record goalscorer with 64 goals in 108 matches.

With six goals in UEFA Group D, Mitrović led Serbia's successful campaign to qualify for the 2018 FIFA World Cup. On 9 June 2018, he scored his first international hat-trick in a friendly against Bolivia. Later that month, he scored the opening goal in a 2018 FIFA World Cup group stage match against Switzerland, which ultimately ended in a 2–1 loss; Serbia were eliminated in the group stage. With six goals, he finished as the top scorer of the inaugural 2018–19 UEFA Nations League, in which Serbia were promoted to League B. In UEFA Euro 2020 qualifying Group B, Mitrović scored ten goals, second in the group behind only Cristiano Ronaldo's eleven. Serbia finished third in the group, but advanced to the play-offs through the UEFA Nations League. They were eliminated by Scotland via penalty shoot-out after Mitrović failed to convert his spot kick. By scoring his 39th goal in a 2022 FIFA World Cup qualifier against Portugal on 27 March 2021, Mitrović surpassed the all-time goal-scoring record for Serbia and its precursor Yugoslavia that had been held by Stjepan Bobek. (Note: FIFA and UEFA consider Serbia to have inherited all of Yugoslavia's international football records.) On 14 November 2021, he scored the deciding, last-minute goal in a 2–1 away win over Portugal that resulted in Serbia qualifying directly for the 2022 FIFA World Cup. He scored six goals in the 2022–23 UEFA Nations League, including a hat-trick against Sweden on 24 September 2022. Three days later, he scored his 50th international goal in a 2–0 away win over Norway that resulted in Serbia being promoted to League A for the first time. Mitrović scored two goals at the 2022 FIFA World Cup.

In total, Mitrović has scored 19 goals in FIFA World Cup qualification, three goals in the FIFA World Cup finals, 11 goals in friendlies, 15 goals in UEFA European Championship qualifying and 15 goals in the UEFA Nations League. The opponent against whom he has scored the most is Lithuania, with eight goals. His most successful goal-scoring year was 2018, when he scored 12 goals in 13 international appearances. The only year in which he has failed to score for Serbia was 2014.

== List of international goals ==
As of match played 31 March 2026. Scores and results list Serbia's goal tally first. Green indicates a match that Serbia won, red a match that Serbia lost and yellow a match that ended in a draw.

List of international goals scored by Aleksandar Mitrović
No.	Cap	Date	Venue	Opponent	Score	Result	Competition	Ref.
1	3	6 September 2013	Red Star Stadium, (Note: The name of the venue was changed to Rajko Mitić Stadium in December 2014.) Belgrade, Serbia	Croatia	1–1	1–1	2014 FIFA World Cup qualification	
2	15	7 September 2015	Nouveau Stade de Bordeaux, Bordeaux, France	France	1–2	1–2	Friendly	
3	20	25 May 2016	Užice City Stadium, Užice, Serbia	Cyprus	1–0	2–1	Friendly	
4	22	5 June 2016	Stade Louis II, Fontvieille, Monaco	Russia	1–1	1–1	Friendly	
5	24	9 October 2016	Rajko Mitić Stadium, Belgrade, Serbia	Austria	1–0	3–2	2018 FIFA World Cup qualification	
6	24	9 October 2016	Rajko Mitić Stadium, Belgrade, Serbia	Austria	2–1	3–2	2018 FIFA World Cup qualification	
7	25	12 November 2016	Cardiff City Stadium, Cardiff, Wales	Wales	1–1	1–1	2018 FIFA World Cup qualification	
8	27	24 March 2017	Boris Paichadze Dinamo Arena, Tbilisi, Georgia	Georgia	2–1	3–1	2018 FIFA World Cup qualification	
9	28	11 June 2017	Rajko Mitić Stadium, Belgrade, Serbia	Wales	1–1	1–1	2018 FIFA World Cup qualification	
10	29	2 September 2017	Partizan Stadium, Belgrade, Serbia	Moldova	3–0	3–0	2018 FIFA World Cup qualification	
11	33	10 November 2017	Tianhe Stadium, Guangzhou, China	China	2–0	2–0	Friendly	
12	35	27 March 2018	The Hive Stadium, London, England	Nigeria	1–0	2–0	Friendly	
13	35	27 March 2018	The Hive Stadium, London, England	Nigeria	2–0	2–0	Friendly	
14	37	9 June 2018	Liebenauer Stadium, Graz, Austria	Bolivia	1–0	5–1	Friendly	
15	37	9 June 2018	Liebenauer Stadium, Graz, Austria	Bolivia	3–0	5–1	Friendly	
16	37	9 June 2018	Liebenauer Stadium, Graz, Austria	Bolivia	5–1	5–1	Friendly	
17	39	22 June 2018	Kaliningrad Stadium, Kaliningrad, Russia	Switzerland	1–0	1–2	2018 FIFA World Cup	
18	42	10 September 2018	Partizan Stadium, Belgrade, Serbia	Romania	1–0	2–2	2018–19 UEFA Nations League C	
19	42	10 September 2018	Partizan Stadium, Belgrade, Serbia	Romania	2–1	2–2	2018–19 UEFA Nations League C	
20	43	11 October 2018	Podgorica City Stadium, Podgorica, Montenegro	Montenegro	1–0	2–0	2018–19 UEFA Nations League C	
21	43	11 October 2018	Podgorica City Stadium, Podgorica, Montenegro	Montenegro	2–0	2–0	2018–19 UEFA Nations League C	
22	45	17 November 2018	Rajko Mitić Stadium, Belgrade, Serbia	Montenegro	2–0	2–1	2018–19 UEFA Nations League C	
23	46	20 November 2018	Partizan Stadium, Belgrade, Serbia	Lithuania	2–0	4–1	2018–19 UEFA Nations League C	
24	49	10 June 2019	Rajko Mitić Stadium, Belgrade, Serbia	Lithuania	1–0	4–1	UEFA Euro 2020 qualifying	
25	49	10 June 2019	Rajko Mitić Stadium, Belgrade, Serbia	Lithuania	2–0	4–1	UEFA Euro 2020 qualifying	
26	50	7 September 2019	Rajko Mitić Stadium, Belgrade, Serbia	Portugal	2–3	2–4	UEFA Euro 2020 qualifying	
27	51	10 September 2019	Stade Josy Barthel, Luxembourg City, Luxembourg	Luxembourg	1–0	3–1	UEFA Euro 2020 qualifying	
28	51	10 September 2019	Stade Josy Barthel, Luxembourg City, Luxembourg	Luxembourg	3–1	3–1	UEFA Euro 2020 qualifying	
29	52	10 October 2019	Mladost Stadium, Kruševac, Serbia	Paraguay	1–0	1–0	Friendly	
30	53	14 October 2019	LFF Stadium, Vilnius, Lithuania	Lithuania	1–0	2–1	UEFA Euro 2020 qualifying	
31	53	14 October 2019	LFF Stadium, Vilnius, Lithuania	Lithuania	2–0	2–1	UEFA Euro 2020 qualifying	
32	54	14 November 2019	Rajko Mitić Stadium, Belgrade, Serbia	Luxembourg	1–0	3–2	UEFA Euro 2020 qualifying	
33	54	14 November 2019	Rajko Mitić Stadium, Belgrade, Serbia	Luxembourg	2–0	3–2	UEFA Euro 2020 qualifying	
34	55	17 November 2019	Rajko Mitić Stadium, Belgrade, Serbia	Ukraine	2–1	2–2	UEFA Euro 2020 qualifying	
35	56	3 September 2020	VTB Arena, Moscow, Russia	Russia	1–2	1–3	2020–21 UEFA Nations League B	
36	59	14 October 2020	Türk Telekom Stadium, Istanbul, Turkey	Turkey	2–0	2–2	2020–21 UEFA Nations League B	
37	62	24 March 2021	Rajko Mitić Stadium, Belgrade, Serbia	Republic of Ireland	2–1	3–2	2022 FIFA World Cup qualification	
38	62	24 March 2021	Rajko Mitić Stadium, Belgrade, Serbia	Republic of Ireland	3–1	3–2	2022 FIFA World Cup qualification	
39	63	27 March 2021	Rajko Mitić Stadium, Belgrade, Serbia	Portugal	1–2	2–2	2022 FIFA World Cup qualification	
40	64	30 March 2021	Baku Olympic Stadium, Baku, Azerbaijan	Azerbaijan	1–0	2–1	2022 FIFA World Cup qualification	
41	64	30 March 2021	Baku Olympic Stadium, Baku, Azerbaijan	Azerbaijan	2–1	2–1	2022 FIFA World Cup qualification	
42	65	4 September 2021	Rajko Mitić Stadium, Belgrade, Serbia	Luxembourg	1–0	4–1	2022 FIFA World Cup qualification	
43	65	4 September 2021	Rajko Mitić Stadium, Belgrade, Serbia	Luxembourg	2–0	4–1	2022 FIFA World Cup qualification	
44	69	14 November 2021	Estádio da Luz, Lisbon, Portugal	Portugal	2–1	2–1	2022 FIFA World Cup qualification	
45	73	5 June 2022	Rajko Mitić Stadium, Belgrade, Serbia	Slovenia	1–0	4–1	2022–23 UEFA Nations League B	
46	74	12 June 2022	Stožice Stadium, Ljubljana, Slovenia	Slovenia	2–0	2–2	2022–23 UEFA Nations League B	
47	75	24 September 2022	Rajko Mitić Stadium, Belgrade, Serbia	Sweden	1–1	4–1	2022–23 UEFA Nations League B	
48	75	24 September 2022	Rajko Mitić Stadium, Belgrade, Serbia	Sweden	2–1	4–1	2022–23 UEFA Nations League B	
49	75	24 September 2022	Rajko Mitić Stadium, Belgrade, Serbia	Sweden	3–1	4–1	2022–23 UEFA Nations League B	
50	76	27 September 2022	Ullevaal Stadion, Oslo, Norway	Norway	2–0	2–0	2022–23 UEFA Nations League B	
51	78	28 November 2022	Al Janoub Stadium, Al Wakrah, Qatar	Cameroon	3–1	3–3	2022 FIFA World Cup	
52	79	2 December 2022	Stadium 974, Doha, Qatar	Switzerland	1–1	2–3	2022 FIFA World Cup	
53	83	10 September 2023	Darius and Girėnas Stadium, Kaunas, Lithuania	Lithuania	1–0	3–1	UEFA Euro 2024 qualifying	
54	83	10 September 2023	Darius and Girėnas Stadium, Kaunas, Lithuania	Lithuania	2–0	3–1	UEFA Euro 2024 qualifying	
55	83	10 September 2023	Darius and Girėnas Stadium, Kaunas, Lithuania	Lithuania	3–0	3–1	UEFA Euro 2024 qualifying	
56	85	17 October 2023	Rajko Mitić Stadium, Belgrade, Serbia	Montenegro	1–0	3–1	UEFA Euro 2024 qualifying	
57	85	17 October 2023	Rajko Mitić Stadium, Belgrade, Serbia	Montenegro	2–1	3–1	UEFA Euro 2024 qualifying	
58	91	8 June 2024	Friends Arena, Solna, Sweden	Sweden	2–0	3–0	Friendly	
59	95	12 October 2024	Dubočica Stadium, Leskovac, Serbia	Switzerland	2–0	2–0	2024–25 UEFA Nations League A	
60	100	10 June 2025	Dubočica Stadium, Leskovac, Serbia	Andorra	1–0	3–0	2026 FIFA World Cup qualification	
61	100	10 June 2025	Dubočica Stadium, Leskovac, Serbia	Andorra	2–0	3–0	2026 FIFA World Cup qualification	
62	100	10 June 2025	Dubočica Stadium, Leskovac, Serbia	Andorra	3–0	3–0	2026 FIFA World Cup qualification	
63	104	14 October 2025	Estadi de la FAF, Encamp, Andorra	Andorra	3–1	3–1	2026 FIFA World Cup qualification	
64	106	31 March 2026	TSC Arena, Bačka Topola, Serbia	Saudi Arabia	2–1	2–1	Friendly	

== Hat-tricks ==
No.	Opponent	Goals	Score	Venue	Competition	Date
1	Bolivia	3 – (1–0', 3–1', 5–1')	5–1	Liebenauer Stadium, Graz, Austria	Friendly	9 June 2018
2	Sweden	3 – (1–1', 2–1', 3–1')	4–1	Rajko Mitić Stadium, Belgrade, Serbia	2022–23 UEFA Nations League B	24 September 2022
3	Lithuania	3 – (1–0', 2–0', 3–0')	3–1	Darius and Girėnas Stadium, Kaunas, Lithuania	UEFA Euro 2024 qualifying	10 September 2023
4	Andorra	3 – (1–0', 2–0', 3–0')	3–0	Dubočica Stadium, Leskovac, Serbia	2026 FIFA World Cup qualification	10 June 2025

== Statistics ==
As of match played 16 November 2026

Caps and goals by year
Year	Caps	Goals
2013	3	1
2014	7	0
2015	8	1
2016	8	5
2017	7	4
2018	13	12
2019	9	11
2020	6	2
2021	8	8
2022	10	8
2023	8	5
2024	11	2
2025	6	4
2026	4	1
Total	108	64

Goals by opponent
Opponent	Goals
Lithuania	8
Luxembourg	6
Montenegro	5
Andorra	4
Sweden	4
Bolivia	3
Portugal	3
Switzerland	3
Austria	2
Azerbaijan	2
Nigeria	2
Republic of Ireland	2
Romania	2
Russia	2
Slovenia	2
Wales	2
Cameroon	1
China	1
Croatia	1
Cyprus	1
France	1
Georgia	1
Moldova	1
Norway	1
Paraguay	1
Saudi Arabia	1
Turkey	1
Ukraine	1
Total	64

Goals by competition
Competition	Goals
FIFA World Cup qualification	19
FIFA World Cup	3
Friendlies	12
UEFA European Championship qualification	15
UEFA Nations League	15
Total	64

== See also ==
- List of men's footballers with 50 or more international goals
- List of top international men's football goalscorers by country
