= 1985–86 Red Star Belgrade season =

Red Star Belgrade
1985–86 season
- Chairman: Miladin Šakić
- Manager: Gojko Zec
- Yugoslav First League: 2nd
- Yugoslav Cup: Semi-finals
- European Cup Winners' Cup: Quarter-finals
- Top goalscorer: League: Milko Gjurovski (14); All: Husref Musemić (17)

During the 1985–86 season, Red Star Belgrade participated in the 1985–86 Yugoslav First League, 1985–86 Yugoslav Cup and 1985–86 European Cup Winners' Cup.

== Season summary ==
The last round of the 1985–86 Yugoslav First League finished with highly controversial results, as Partizan won the title. Slavko Šajber, the president of the Football Association of Yugoslavia, annulled the results of the last round and decided that all matches must be replayed. Partizan refused to play again, allowing Red Star to win the title and participate in the 1986–87 European Cup as Yugoslav champions. More than a year later, the Court of Joint Labour of SR Serbia returned the title to Partizan due to lack of evidence in match fixing.

== Squad ==
| Name | Yugoslav First League | | Yugoslav Cup | | European Cup Winners' Cup | | Total | |
| Name | Apps | Goals | Apps | Goals | Apps | Goals | Apps | Goals |
|---|---|---|---|---|---|---|---|---|
Goalkeepers
| (Socialist Federal Republic of Yugoslavia) Živan Ljukovčan | 34 | 0 | 4 | 0 | 6 | 0 | 44 | 0 |
Defenders
| (Socialist Federal Republic of Yugoslavia) Marko Elsner | 31 | 2 | 4 | 0 | 5 | 0 | 40 | 2 |
| (Socialist Federal Republic of Yugoslavia) Slavko Radovanović | 24 | 0 | 2 | 0 | 3 | 0 | 29 | 0 |
| (Socialist Federal Republic of Yugoslavia) Zlatko Krdžević | 24 | 1 | 1 | 0 | 0 | 0 | 25 | 1 |
| (Socialist Federal Republic of Yugoslavia) Miodrag Krivokapić | 20 | 0 | 2 | 0 | 3 | 0 | 25 | 0 |
| (Socialist Federal Republic of Yugoslavia) Zoran Dimitrijević | 17 | 2 | 3 | 0 | 3 | 0 | 23 | 2 |
| (Socialist Federal Republic of Yugoslavia) Milan Ivanović | 16 | 0 | 1 | 0 | 4 | 0 | 21 | 0 |
| (Socialist Federal Republic of Yugoslavia) Miroslav Šugar | 10 | 0 | 1 | 0 | 5 | 1 | 16 | 1 |
| (Socialist Federal Republic of Yugoslavia) Milan Jovin | 6 | 0 | 0 | 0 | 0 | 0 | 6 | 0 |
Midfielders
| (Socialist Federal Republic of Yugoslavia) Boško Gjurovski | 33 | 12 | 4 | 1 | 5 | 2 | 42 | 15 |
| (Socialist Federal Republic of Yugoslavia) Mitar Mrkela | 29 | 10 | 4 | 0 | 6 | 1 | 39 | 11 |
| (Socialist Federal Republic of Yugoslavia) Milan Janković | 29 | 6 | 4 | 1 | 5 | 1 | 38 | 8 |
| (Socialist Federal Republic of Yugoslavia) Goran Milojević | 22 | 4 | 3 | 1 | 3 | 0 | 28 | 5 |
| (Socialist Federal Republic of Yugoslavia) Žarko Đurović | 23 | 3 | 1 | 1 | 3 | 2 | 27 | 6 |
| (Socialist Federal Republic of Yugoslavia) Jovica Nikolić | 17 | 2 | 3 | 0 | 5 | 1 | 25 | 3 |
Forwards
| (Socialist Federal Republic of Yugoslavia) Husref Musemić | 33 | 12 | 4 | 3 | 6 | 2 | 43 | 17 |
| (Socialist Federal Republic of Yugoslavia) Milko Gjurovski | 21 | 14 | 3 | 0 | 3 | 0 | 27 | 14 |
| (Socialist Federal Republic of Yugoslavia) Zoran Pavlović | 12 | 2 | 1 | 0 | 0 | 0 | 13 | 2 |
Players sold or loaned out during the season
| (Socialist Federal Republic of Yugoslavia) Miralem Zjajo | 4 | 0 | 0 | 0 | 1 | 0 | 5 | 0 |
| (Socialist Federal Republic of Yugoslavia) Zlatko Krmpotić | 4 | 1 | 0 | 0 | 1 | 0 | 5 | 1 |
| (Socialist Federal Republic of Yugoslavia) Vlada Stošić | 3 | 0 | 0 | 0 | 0 | 0 | 3 | 0 |
| (Socialist Federal Republic of Yugoslavia) Dragan Miletović | 15 | 0 | 3 | 0 | 6 | 0 | 24 | 0 |

== Results ==
=== Yugoslav First League ===
| Pos | Team | Pld | W | D | L | GF | GA | GD | Pts | Qualification or relegation |
|---|---|---|---|---|---|---|---|---|---|---|
| 1 | Partizan (C) | 34 | 21 | 7 | 6 | 65 | 29 | +36 | 49 | Qualification for UEFA Cup first round |
| 2 | Red Star Belgrade | 34 | 21 | 7 | 6 | 73 | 38 | +35 | 49 | Qualification for European Cup first round |
| 3 | Velež | 34 | 13 | 11 | 10 | 64 | 50 | +14 | 37 | Qualification for Cup Winners' Cup first round |
| 4 | Hajduk Split | 34 | 15 | 7 | 12 | 55 | 44 | +11 | 37 | Qualification for UEFA Cup first round |
| 5 | Rijeka | 34 | 12 | 13 | 9 | 42 | 31 | +11 | 37 | Qualification for UEFA Cup first round |

Source: rsssf.org
Rules for classification: 1) points; 2) goal difference; 3) number of goals scored.
(C) Champions

| Date | Opponent | Venue | Result | Scorers |
|---|---|---|---|---|
| 17 August 1985 | Osijek | H | 1–0 | Krmpotić |
| 21 August 1985 | Partizan | A | 1–1 | M. Gjurovski (pen.) |
| 25 August 1985 | Vojvodina | H | 3–1 | Musemić (2), B. Gjurovski |
| 1 September 1985 | Čelik | A | 0–0 | |
| 4 September 1985 | Dinamo Vinkovci | H | 0–1 | |
| 8 September 1985 | Rijeka | A | 1–1 | Janković (pen.) |
| 14 September 1985 | Dinamo Zagreb | H | 2–0 | Mrkela, M. Gjurovski |
| 6 October 1985 | Željezničar | A | 5–2 | B. Gjurovski (2), Musemić (2), M. Gjurovski |
| 9 October 1985 | Sloboda Tuzla | H | 2–1 | Elsner, Mrkela |
| 12 October 1985 | OFK Beograd | A | 1–3 | Janković (pen.) |
| 20 October 1985 | Hajduk Split | A | 1–0 | Dimitrijević |
| 27 October 1985 | Vardar | H | 4–0 | Nikolić, B. Gjurovski, Milojević, Setinov (o.g.) |
| 3 November 1985 | Budućnost | A | 4–0 | Musemić, Dimitrijević, Mrkela, M. Gjurovski |
| 9 November 1985 | Velež | A | 2–0 | M. Gjurovski (2) |
| 23 November 1985 | Sutjeska Nikšić | H | 4–2 | Mrkela (3), B. Gjurovski |
| 1 December 1985 | Prishtina | A | 1–2 | Elsner |
| 8 December 1985 | Sarajevo | H | 4–3 | Mrkela, Musemić (2), Milojević |
| 1 March 1986 | Velež | H | 2–2 | M. Gjurovski, Musemić |
| 9 March 1986 | Osijek | A | 0–0 | |
| 15 March 1986 | Partizan | H | 2–1 | Nikolić, Musemić |
| 23 March 1986 | Vojvodina | A | 1–4 | M. Gjurovski |
| 30 March 1986 | Čelik | H | 4–1 | Mrkela, Musemić, Janković (pen.), Pavlović |
| 6 April 1986 | Dinamo Vinkovci | A | 1–2 | Mrkela |
| 12 April 1986 | Rijeka | H | 1–1 | B. Gjurovski |
| 20 April 1986 | Dinamo Zagreb | A | 1–3 | Musemić |
| 27 April 1986 | Željezničar | H | 4–1 | B. Gjurovski, Janković (pen.), Đurović, Krdžević |
| 4 May 1986 | Sloboda Tuzla | A | 2–1 | M. Gjurovski (2) |
| 7 May 1986 | OFK Beograd | H | 2–1 | M. Gjurovski, Mrkela |
| 18 May 1986 | Hajduk Split | H | 4–0 | Vulić (o.g.), Musemić, Pavlović, B. Gjurovski |
| 25 May 1986 | Vardar | A | 2–1 | B. Gjurovski, Đurović |
| 28 May 1986 | Budućnost | H | 3–1 | B. Gjurovski, Janković (pen.), Milojević |
| 1 June 1986 | Sutjeska Nikšić | A | 2–2 | Đurović, B. Gjurovski |
| 8 June 1986 | Prishtina | H | 2–0 | Milojević, B. Gjurovski |
| 14 June 1986 | Sarajevo | A | 4–0 | M. Gjurovski (3), Janković (pen.) |

=== Yugoslav Cup ===
| Date | Opponent | Venue | Result | Scorers |
|---|---|---|---|---|
| 30 October 1985 | OFK Kikinda | H | 2–0 | B. Gjurovski, Đurović |
| 20 November 1985 | Vardar | A | 2–0 | Musemić (2) |
| 23 February 1986 | Osijek | H | 3–1 | Janković (pen.), Musemić, Milojević |
| 9 April 1986 | Dinamo Zagreb | A | 0–4 | |

=== European Cup Winners' Cup ===
==== First round ====
| 18 September 1985 | Red Star Belgrade (Socialist Federal Republic of Yugoslavia) | 2–0 | (Switzerland) Aarau | Red Star Stadium, Belgrade |
| | Musemić 22'; B. Gjurovski 72' | | | Attendance: 40,000; Referee: Anatoly Milchenko (Soviet Union) |

| 2 October 1985 | Aarau (Switzerland) | 2–2 | (Socialist Federal Republic of Yugoslavia) Red Star Belgrade | Letzigrund, Zürich |
| | Meyer 7'; Zwahlen 37' | | Musemić 3'; Janković 17' | Attendance: 12,000; Referee: Robert Matusik (Czechoslovakia) |

==== Second round ====
| 23 October 1985 | Lyngby (Denmark) | 2–2 | (Socialist Federal Republic of Yugoslavia) Red Star Belgrade | Idrætspark, Copenhagen |
| | Christensen 4'; Spangsborg 40' | | B. Gjurovski 53'; Mrkela 60' | Attendance: 13,000; Referee: Arto Ravander (Finland) |

| 22 November 1985 | Red Star Belgrade (Socialist Federal Republic of Yugoslavia) | 3–1 | (Denmark) Lyngby | Red Star Stadium, Belgrade |
| | Šugar 25'; Nikolić 63'; Đurović 84' | | Vilmar 59' | Attendance: 35,000; Referee: Gerasimos Germanakos (Greece) |

==== Quarter-finals ====
| 5 March 1986 | Red Star Belgrade (Socialist Federal Republic of Yugoslavia) | 0–2 | (Spain) Atlético Madrid | Red Star Stadium, Belgrade |
| | | | da Silva 29', 89' | Attendance: 70,000; Referee: Luigi Agnolin (Italy) |

| 19 March 1986 | Atlético Madrid (Spain) | 1–1 | (Socialist Federal Republic of Yugoslavia) Red Star Belgrade | Vicente Calderón Stadium, Madrid |
| | Marina 7' | | Đurović 82' | Attendance: 40,000; Referee: Bob Valentine (Scotland) |

== See also ==
- List of Red Star Belgrade seasons
