= 1984–85 Yugoslav Cup =

1984–85 Yugoslav Football Cup
37th Marshal Tito Cup

Tournament details
- Country: Yugoslavia
- Dates: 29 August 1984 – 24 May 1985
- Teams: 5,874 (preliminaries); 32 (final rounds)

Final positions
- Champions: Red Star Belgrade (11th title)
- Runners-up: Dinamo Zagreb

Tournament statistics
- Matches played: 32
- Top goal scorer: Sulejman Halilović (6)

The 1984–85 Yugoslav Cup was the 37th season of the top football knockout competition in SFR Yugoslavia, the Yugoslav Cup (Serbo-Croatian: Kup Jugoslavije), also known as the "Marshal Tito Cup" (Kup Maršala Tita), since its establishment in 1946.

== Calendar ==
The Yugoslav Cup was a tournament for which clubs from all tiers of the football pyramid were eligible to enter. In addition, amateur teams put together by individual Yugoslav People's Army garrisons and various factories and industrial plants were also encouraged to enter, which meant that each cup edition could have several thousands of teams in its preliminary stages. These teams would play through a number of qualifying rounds before reaching the first round proper, in which they would be paired with top-flight teams.

The cup final was played over two legs on 7 and 24 May, traditionally scheduled to coincide with Youth Day celebrated on 25 May, a national holiday in Yugoslavia which also doubled as the official commemoration of Josip Broz Tito's birthday.

| Round | Legs | Date | Fixtures | Clubs |
|---|---|---|---|---|
| First round (round of 32) | Single | 29 August 1984 | 16 | 32 → 16 |
| Second round (round of 16) | Single | 10 October 1984 | 8 | 16 → 8 |
| Quarter-finals | Single | 13 March 1985 | 4 | 8 → 4 |
| Semi-finals | Single | 11 April 1985 | 2 | 4 → 2 |
| Final | Double | 7 and 24 May 1985 | 2 | 2 → 1 |

== First round proper ==
In the following tables winning teams are marked in bold; teams from outside top level are marked in italic script.

| Tie no | Home team | Score | Away team |
|---|---|---|---|
| 1 | Belišće | 0–1 | **Vojvodina** |
| 2 | **Red Star Belgrade** | 1–0 | Čelik Zenica |
| 3 | Dinamo Vinkovci | 0–1 | **OFK Kikinda** |
| 4 | **Dinamo Zagreb** | 2–0 | Vlaznimi Đakovica |
| 5 | **Iskra Bugojno** | 1–0 | Prishtina |
| 6 | **Jedinstvo Paraćin** | 0–0 (7–6 p) | Sloboda Tuzla |
| 7 | Karlovac | 1–4 | **Vardar** |
| 8 | **Leotar** | 1–0 | Željezničar |
| 9 | **Osijek** | 3–1 | Ivangrad |
| 10 | **Pelister** | 4–1 | Sarajevo |
| 11 | Rad | 0–2 | **Rijeka** |
| 12 | Radnički Niš | 1–1 (5–6 p) | **Olimpija Ljubljana** |
| 13 | Radnički Pirot | 0–1 | **Hajduk Split** |
| 14 | Triglav | 0–4 | **Partizan** |
| 15 | Zadar | 0–4 | **Budućnost Titograd** |
| 16 | Vršac | 0–0 (1–4 p) | **Velež** |

== Second round proper ==
| Tie no | Home team | Score | Away team |
|---|---|---|---|
| 1 | Budućnost Titograd | 0–1 | **Iskra Bugojno** |
| 2 | **Hajduk Split** | 5–0 | Jedinstvo Paraćin |
| 3 | OFK Kikinda | 0–3 | **Dinamo Zagreb** |
| 4 | **Olimpija Ljubljana** | 3–0 | Pelister |
| 5 | **Partizan** | 0–0 (4–3 p) | Rijeka |
| 6 | Vardar | 2–4 | **Red Star Belgrade** |
| 7 | **Velež** | 3–1 | Osijek |
| 8 | **Vojvodina** | 0–0 (5–4 p) | Leotar |

== Quarter-finals ==
| Tie no | Home team | Score | Away team |
|---|---|---|---|
| 1 | **Dinamo Zagreb** | 3–1 | Hajduk Split |
| 2 | **Iskra Bugojno** | 2–1 | Velež |
| 3 | Partizan | 0–2 | **Red Star Belgrade** |
| 4 | **Vojvodina** | 3–0 | Olimpija Ljubljana |

== Semi-finals ==
| Tie no | Home team | Score | Away team |
|---|---|---|---|
| 1 | **Red Star Belgrade** | 3–2 | Vojvodina |
| 2 | **Dinamo Zagreb** | 1–1 (5–2 p) | Iskra Bugojno |

== Final ==
=== First leg ===
7 May 1985

| Dinamo Zagreb | 1–2 | Red Star Belgrade |
|---|---|---|
| Cvjetković 83' | | Halilović 63' (pen.); M. Gjurovski 72' |

Maksimir Stadium, Zagreb
Attendance: 15,000
Referee: Stojan Ilijevski (Skopje)

| **Dinamo** | **Red Star** |

| GK | **1** | (Socialist Federal Republic of Yugoslavia) Ranko Stojić |
| MF | **2** | (Socialist Federal Republic of Yugoslavia) Željko Cupan | (substituted off) 74' |
| FW | **3** | (Socialist Federal Republic of Yugoslavia) Zvjezdan Cvetković |
| DF | **4** | (Socialist Federal Republic of Yugoslavia) Mustafa Arslanović |
| DF | **5** | (Socialist Federal Republic of Yugoslavia) Mirko Lulić |
| DF | **6** | (Socialist Federal Republic of Yugoslavia) Srećko Bogdan (c) |
| DF | **7** | (Socialist Federal Republic of Yugoslavia) Predrag Jurić | (substituted off) 56' |
| MF | **8** | (Socialist Federal Republic of Yugoslavia) Snježan Cerin |
| MF | **9** | (Socialist Federal Republic of Yugoslavia) Mihailo Petrović |
| FW | **10** | (Socialist Federal Republic of Yugoslavia) Marko Mlinarić |
| FW | **11** | (Socialist Federal Republic of Yugoslavia) Borislav Cvetković |
Substitutes:
| MF | **16** | (Socialist Federal Republic of Yugoslavia) Ivan Cvjetković | (substituted on) 56' |
| MF | ? | (Socialist Federal Republic of Yugoslavia) Jasmin Džeko | (substituted on) 74' |
Manager:
(Socialist Federal Republic of Yugoslavia) Zdenko Kobeščak

| GK | **1** | (Socialist Federal Republic of Yugoslavia) Živan Ljukovčan |
| MF | **2** | (Socialist Federal Republic of Yugoslavia) Zlatko Krmpotić (c) | (substituted off) 64' |
| FW | **3** | (Socialist Federal Republic of Yugoslavia) Zoran Dimitrijević |
| DF | **4** | (Socialist Federal Republic of Yugoslavia) Milan Janković |
| DF | **5** | (Socialist Federal Republic of Yugoslavia) Marko Elsner |
| DF | **6** | (Socialist Federal Republic of Yugoslavia) Dragan Miletović |
| DF | **7** | (Socialist Federal Republic of Yugoslavia) Jovica Nikolić | (substituted off) 56' |
| MF | **8** | (Socialist Federal Republic of Yugoslavia) Boško Gjurovski |
| MF | **9** | (Socialist Federal Republic of Yugoslavia) Milko Gjurovski | (substituted off) 75' |
| FW | **10** | (Socialist Federal Republic of Yugoslavia) Mitar Mrkela |
| FW | **11** | (Socialist Federal Republic of Yugoslavia) Sulejman Halilović |
Substitutes:
| MF | ? | (Socialist Federal Republic of Yugoslavia) Milan Jovin | (substituted on) 56' |
| MF | ? | (Socialist Federal Republic of Yugoslavia) Miroslav Šugar | (substituted on) 75' |
Manager:
(Socialist Federal Republic of Yugoslavia) Gojko Zec

=== Second leg ===
24 May 1985

| Red Star Belgrade | 1–1 | Dinamo Zagreb |
|---|---|---|
| Halilović 11' | | Cerin 38' |

Red Star Stadium, Belgrade
Attendance: 60,000
Referee: Edvard Šoštarič (Maribor)

| **Red Star** | **Dinamo** |

| GK | **1** | (Socialist Federal Republic of Yugoslavia) Živan Ljukovčan |
| FW | **2** | (Socialist Federal Republic of Yugoslavia) Zoran Dimitrijević |
| DF | **3** | (Socialist Federal Republic of Yugoslavia) Zlatko Krdžević |
| DF | **4** | (Socialist Federal Republic of Yugoslavia) Dragan Miletović |
| DF | **5** | (Socialist Federal Republic of Yugoslavia) Marko Elsner |
| MF | **6** | (Socialist Federal Republic of Yugoslavia) Zlatko Krmpotić (c) |
| DF | **7** | (Socialist Federal Republic of Yugoslavia) Milan Janković | (substituted off) 76' |
| MF | **8** | (Socialist Federal Republic of Yugoslavia) Boško Gjurovski |
| DF | **9** | (Socialist Federal Republic of Yugoslavia) Đorđe Milovanović |
| FW | **10** | (Socialist Federal Republic of Yugoslavia) Sulejman Halilović |
| FW | **11** | (Socialist Federal Republic of Yugoslavia) Mitar Mrkela | (substituted off) 83' |
Substitutes:
| MF | ? | (Socialist Federal Republic of Yugoslavia) Miodrag Krivokapić | (substituted on) 76' |
| MF | ? | (Socialist Federal Republic of Yugoslavia) Miroslav Šugar | (substituted on) 83' |
Manager:
(Socialist Federal Republic of Yugoslavia) Gojko Zec

| GK | **1** | (Socialist Federal Republic of Yugoslavia) Ranko Stojić |
| DF | **2** | (Socialist Federal Republic of Yugoslavia) Jasmin Džeko |
| MF | **3** | (Socialist Federal Republic of Yugoslavia) Željko Cupan |
| DF | **4** | (Socialist Federal Republic of Yugoslavia) Slavko Ištvanić | (substituted off) 59' |
| DF | **5** | (Socialist Federal Republic of Yugoslavia) Mirko Lulić |
| DF | **6** | (Socialist Federal Republic of Yugoslavia) Srećko Bogdan (c) |
| FW | **7** | (Socialist Federal Republic of Yugoslavia) Borislav Cvetković | (substituted off) 76' |
| MF | **8** | (Socialist Federal Republic of Yugoslavia) Snježan Cerin |
| MF | **9** | (Socialist Federal Republic of Yugoslavia) Mihailo Petrović |
| FW | **10** | (Socialist Federal Republic of Yugoslavia) Marko Mlinarić |
| DF | **11** | (Socialist Federal Republic of Yugoslavia) Ivan Cvjetković |
Substitutes:
| MF | ? | (Socialist Federal Republic of Yugoslavia) Predrag Jurić | (substituted on) 59' |
| MF | ? | (Socialist Federal Republic of Yugoslavia) Nikola Jurčević | (substituted on) 76' |
Co-managers:
(Socialist Federal Republic of Yugoslavia) Zdenko Kobeščak
(Socialist Federal Republic of Yugoslavia) Ivo Šušak

**Match rules**

- 90 minutes.
- Penalty shoot-out if aggregate scores still level (no extra time, no away goals rule).
- Five named substitutes
- Maximum of 2 substitutions.

== See also ==
- 1984–85 Yugoslav First League
- 1984–85 Yugoslav Second League
