= 1983–84 Yugoslav First League =

Prva savezna liga
- Season: 1983–84
- Dates: 14 August 1983 – 30 May 1984
- Champions: Red Star (15th title)
- Promoted: Iskra Bugojno; Sutjeska Nikšić
- Relegated: Olimpija Ljubljana; Čelik Zenica
- European Cup: Red Star
- UEFA Cup: Partizan; Željezničar Sarajevo; Rijeka
- Cup Winners' Cup: Hajduk Split
- Matches: 306
- Goals: 760 (2.48 per match)
- Top goalscorer: Darko Pančev (19)
- Average attendance: 9,912

== Teams ==
=== Changes from last season ===
Teams promoted from 1982 to 1983 Yugoslav Second League

- Čelik
- Priština

Teams relegated to 1983–84 Yugoslav Second League

- 17th place: OFK Belgrade
- 18th place: Galenika Zemun

=== Overview ===
| Team | Home city | Federal Republic | Position in 1982–83 |
|---|---|---|---|
| Budućnost | Titograd | SR Montenegro | 14th |
| Čelik | Zenica | SR Bosnia and Herzegovina | |
| Red Star | Belgrade | SR Serbia | 5th |
| Dinamo Vinkovci | Vinkovci | SR Croatia | 12th |
| Dinamo Zagreb | Zagreb | SR Croatia | 3rd |
| Hajduk Split | Split | SR Croatia | 2nd |
| Olimpija | Ljubljana | SR Slovenia | 7th |
| Osijek | Osijek | SR Croatia | 16th |
| Partizan | Belgrade | SR Serbia | 1st |
| Priština | Priština | SR Serbia | |
| Radnički Niš | Niš | SR Serbia | 4th |
| Rijeka | Rijeka | SR Croatia | 15th |
| Sarajevo | Sarajevo | SR Bosnia and Herzegovina | 11th |
| Sloboda | Tuzla | SR Bosnia and Herzegovina | 6th |
| Vardar | Skopje | SR Macedonia | 8th |
| Velež | Mostar | SR Bosnia and Herzegovina | 13th |
| Vojvodina | Novi Sad | SR Serbia | 9th |
| Željezničar | Sarajevo | SR Bosnia and Herzegovina | 10th |

== League table ==
| Pos | Team | Pld | W | D | L | GF | GA | GD | Pts | Qualification or relegation |
|---|---|---|---|---|---|---|---|---|---|---|
| 1 | Red Star Belgrade (C) | 34 | 17 | 10 | 7 | 52 | 26 | +26 | 44 | Qualification for European Cup first round |
| 2 | Partizan | 34 | 15 | 12 | 7 | 43 | 25 | +18 | 42 | Qualification for UEFA Cup first round |
| 3 | Željezničar | 34 | 15 | 12 | 7 | 52 | 35 | +17 | 42 | Qualification for UEFA Cup first round |
| 4 | Rijeka | 34 | 16 | 10 | 8 | 53 | 37 | +16 | 42 | Qualification for UEFA Cup first round |
| 5 | Hajduk Split | 34 | 12 | 15 | 7 | 39 | 22 | +17 | 39 | Qualification for Cup Winners' Cup first round |
| 6 | Osijek | 34 | 12 | 10 | 12 | 36 | 39 | −3 | 34 | |
| 7 | Radnički Niš | 34 | 15 | 3 | 16 | 40 | 47 | −7 | 33 | |
| 8 | Priština | 34 | 15 | 3 | 16 | 36 | 55 | −19 | 33 | |
| 9 | Sarajevo | 34 | 11 | 10 | 13 | 53 | 46 | +7 | 32 | |
| 10 | Vojvodina | 34 | 11 | 10 | 13 | 39 | 36 | +3 | 32 | |
| 11 | Dinamo Vinkovci | 34 | 11 | 10 | 13 | 41 | 54 | −13 | 32 | |
| 12 | Dinamo Zagreb | 34 | 11 | 9 | 14 | 58 | 51 | +7 | 31 | |
| 13 | Velež | 34 | 11 | 9 | 14 | 33 | 35 | −2 | 31 | |
| 14 | Budućnost | 34 | 12 | 7 | 15 | 33 | 37 | −4 | 31 | |
| 15 | Vardar | 34 | 14 | 3 | 17 | 46 | 56 | −10 | 31 | |
| 16 | Sloboda Tuzla | 34 | 12 | 7 | 15 | 41 | 53 | −12 | 31 | |
| 17 | Olimpija (R) | 34 | 10 | 8 | 16 | 29 | 40 | −11 | 28 | Relegation to Yugoslav Second League |
| 18 | Čelik (R) | 34 | 9 | 6 | 19 | 36 | 66 | −30 | 24 | Relegation to Yugoslav Second League |

Source: rsssf.org
Rules for classification: 1) points; 2) goal difference; 3) number of goals scored.
(C) Champions; (R) Relegated

== Results ==
| Home \ Away | BUD | ČEL | DVI | DZG | HAJ | OLI | OSI | PAR | PRI | RNI | RSB | RIJ | SAR | SLO | VAR | VEL | VOJ | ŽEL |
|---|---|---|---|---|---|---|---|---|---|---|---|---|---|---|---|---|---|---|
| Budućnost | | 0–1 | 2–2 | 3–1 | 0–1 | 1–0 | 0–0 | 1–0 | 3–0 | 1–0 | 1–0 | 2–0 | 1–1 | 2–0 | 2–1 | 1–0 | 1–1 | 1–1 |
| Čelik | 1–1 | | 4–2 | 2–2 | 0–1 | 0–1 | 1–0 | 1–1 | 2–0 | 2–1 | 0–0 | 2–3 | 2–2 | 2–1 | 4–2 | 4–1 | 2–1 | 0–1 |
| Dinamo Vinkovci | 2–1 | 3–1 | | 1–1 | 1–1 | 1–1 | 2–2 | 1–0 | 2–0 | 3–0 | 0–3 | 1–0 | 1–1 | 5–2 | 2–0 | 1–0 | 2–1 | 1–1 |
| Dinamo Zagreb | 3–0 | 3–0 | 1–2 | | 3–1 | 2–0 | 1–0 | 1–1 | 3–1 | 2–1 | 0–0 | 3–3 | 4–0 | 1–2 | 4–2 | 2–0 | 5–2 | 2–2 |
| Hajduk Split | 3–0 | 4–0 | 2–2 | 1–1 | | 3–0 | 3–0 | 0–0 | 2–1 | 1–2 | 1–1 | 0–0 | 1–1 | 5–0 | 2–0 | 2–0 | 0–0 | 2–1 |
| Olimpija | 3–1 | 1–0 | 2–0 | 2–1 | 0–1 | | 0–0 | 0–0 | 3–0 | 0–1 | 0–1 | 1–2 | 1–1 | 2–1 | 2–1 | 2–0 | 0–0 | 1–1 |
| Osijek | 1–0 | 5–0 | 1–0 | 0–0 | 0–0 | 2–1 | | 0–0 | 2–0 | 3–0 | 1–1 | 4–1 | 1–0 | 2–1 | 3–1 | 1–1 | 4–2 | 1–0 |
| Partizan | 1–0 | 5–2 | 1–0 | 1–0 | 1–0 | 2–2 | 3–0 | | 1–0 | 1–2 | 0–0 | 2–1 | 2–0 | 2–1 | 5–2 | 3–0 | 2–0 | 0–1 |
| Priština | 1–0 | 1–0 | 1–0 | 3–2 | 0–0 | 2–1 | 2–1 | 2–1 | | 1–0 | 1–1 | 1–0 | 4–0 | 1–0 | 2–1 | 2–0 | 1–0 | 1–1 |
| Radnički Niš | 0–0 | 4–1 | 3–0 | 3–2 | 1–0 | 4–0 | 2–0 | 0–5 | 3–1 | | 1–0 | 3–1 | 1–3 | 2–1 | 0–1 | 0–0 | 1–0 | 3–2 |
| Red Star | 1–0 | 4–0 | 7–1 | 3–2 | 2–0 | 2–1 | 0–0 | 0–0 | 1–3 | 2–1 | | 4–1 | 1–0 | 4–1 | 2–0 | 1–0 | 1–0 | 1–3 |
| Rijeka | 1–0 | 4–1 | 2–1 | 2–0 | 1–1 | 1–0 | 4–1 | 3–0 | 2–1 | 2–0 | 0–0 | | 3–1 | 6–1 | 1–0 | 0–0 | 2–1 | 2–0 |
| Sarajevo | 0–2 | 3–0 | 3–0 | 1–0 | 0–0 | 4–0 | 5–0 | 0–1 | 6–0 | 3–0 | 2–2 | 0–0 | | 2–0 | 3–0 | 1–2 | 2–0 | 1–1 |
| Sloboda Tuzla | 4–0 | 1–0 | 2–0 | 3–2 | 1–0 | 2–0 | 2–0 | 1–1 | 3–0 | 4–1 | 0–3 | 1–1 | 2–2 | | 1–0 | 2–1 | 0–0 | 0–0 |
| Vardar | 3–0 | 1–0 | 5–1 | 1–0 | 2–0 | 1–0 | 3–1 | 0–0 | 4–0 | 0–0 | 1–0 | 2–2 | 4–3 | 3–0 | | 4–2 | 1–0 | 0–5 |
| Velež | 1–0 | 2–0 | 0–0 | 1–1 | 1–1 | 0–1 | 1–0 | 0–0 | 3–1 | 3–0 | 1–0 | 1–1 | 3–0 | 2–0 | 4–0 | | 0–0 | 2–0 |
| Vojvodina | 0–4 | 4–0 | 1–0 | 4–2 | 0–0 | 1–0 | 0–0 | 3–0 | 3–0 | 1–0 | 3–1 | 0–0 | 2–0 | 1–1 | 2–0 | 3–1 | | 3–1 |
| Željezničar | 3–2 | 1–1 | 2–0 | 3–1 | 0–0 | 1–1 | 2–0 | 1–1 | 4–2 | 1–0 | 1–3 | 2–1 | 5–2 | 0–0 | 3–0 | 1–0 | 1–0 | |

Source: DataSoccer.it
Legend: Blue = home team win; Yellow = draw; Red = away team win.

== Winning squad ==
- Red Star Belgrade (coach Gojko Zec)

| Player | Apps | Goals |
|---|---|---|
| (Socialist Federal Republic of Yugoslavia) Tomislav Ivković | 34 | 0 |
| (Socialist Federal Republic of Yugoslavia) Marko Elsner | 32 | 0 |
| (Socialist Federal Republic of Yugoslavia) Miloš Šestić | 29 | 7 |
| (Socialist Federal Republic of Yugoslavia) Milko Đurovski | 27 | 13 |
| (Socialist Federal Republic of Yugoslavia) Boško Đurovski | 23 | 8 |
| (Socialist Federal Republic of Yugoslavia) Jovica Nikolić | 22 | 8 |
| (Socialist Federal Republic of Yugoslavia) Miroslav Šugar | 22 | 0 |
| (Socialist Federal Republic of Yugoslavia) Đorđe Milovanović | 21 | 3 |
| (Socialist Federal Republic of Yugoslavia) Milan Jovin | 21 | 0 |
| (Socialist Federal Republic of Yugoslavia) Mitar Mrkela | 20 | 2 |
| (Socialist Federal Republic of Yugoslavia) Zoran Banković | 19 | 3 |
| (Socialist Federal Republic of Yugoslavia) Ivan Jurišić | 19 | 0 |
| (Socialist Federal Republic of Yugoslavia) Dragan Miletović | 17 | 0 |
| (Socialist Federal Republic of Yugoslavia) Milan Janković | 16 | 2 |
| (Socialist Federal Republic of Yugoslavia) Ljubiša Stojanović | 15 | 1 |
| (Socialist Federal Republic of Yugoslavia) Ranko Đorđić | 14 | 3 |
| (Socialist Federal Republic of Yugoslavia) Rajko Janjanin | 14 | 0 |
| (Socialist Federal Republic of Yugoslavia) Goran Milojević | 14 | 0 |
| (Socialist Federal Republic of Yugoslavia) Žarko Đurović | 13 | 0 |
| (Socialist Federal Republic of Yugoslavia) Nedeljko Milosavljević | 12 | 0 |
| (Socialist Federal Republic of Yugoslavia) Dragić Komadina | 9 | 0 |
| (Socialist Federal Republic of Yugoslavia) Miodrag Krivokapić | 4 | 0 |
| (Socialist Federal Republic of Yugoslavia) Cvijetin Blagojević | 3 | 0 |
| (Socialist Federal Republic of Yugoslavia) Zlatko Krmpotić | 2 | 0 |
| (Socialist Federal Republic of Yugoslavia) Radoslav Žugić | 1 | 1 |
| (Socialist Federal Republic of Yugoslavia) Radomir Savić | 1 | 0 |
| (Socialist Federal Republic of Yugoslavia) Slavko Radovanović | 1 | 0 |

== Top scorers ==
| Rank | Player | Club | Goals |
|---|---|---|---|
| 1 | (Socialist Federal Republic of Yugoslavia) Darko Pančev | Vardar | 19 |
| 2 | (Socialist Federal Republic of Yugoslavia) Snješko Cerin | Dinamo Zagreb | 16 |
| 3 | (Socialist Federal Republic of Yugoslavia) Sulejman Halilović | Dinamo Vinkovci | 15 |
| 4 | (Socialist Federal Republic of Yugoslavia) Nikola Nikić | Željezničar | 14 |
| 5 | (Socialist Federal Republic of Yugoslavia) Milko Đurovski | Red Star | 13 |
| 5 | (Socialist Federal Republic of Yugoslavia) Vasil Ringov | Vardar / Dinamo Zagreb | 13 |
| 7 | (Socialist Federal Republic of Yugoslavia) Zoran Batrović | Priština | 11 |
| 7 | (Socialist Federal Republic of Yugoslavia) Damir Desnica | Rijeka | 11 |
| 9 | (Socialist Federal Republic of Yugoslavia) Edin Bahtić | Željezničar | 10 |
| 9 | (Socialist Federal Republic of Yugoslavia) Ivan Cvjetković | Sloboda Tuzla | 10 |
| 9 | (Socialist Federal Republic of Yugoslavia) Mersad Kovačević | Sloboda Tuzla | 10 |

== Attendance ==
| Club | Average home attendance | Average away attendance |
|---|---|---|
| Red Star Belgrade | 23,588 | 20,588 |
| FK Priština | 18,647 | 7,647 |
| FK Partizan | 16,647 | 21,235 |
| Dinamo Zagreb | 16,294 | 13,412 |
| Hajduk Split | 13,353 | 17,824 |
| FK Vardar | 11,000 | 7,765 |
| Čelik Zenica | 8,588 | 7,059 |
| FK Željezničar | 8,529 | 7,824 |
| FK Sarajevo | 7,765 | 7,765 |
| NK Olimpija | 7,706 | 5,765 |
| FK Velež | 7,353 | 10,412 |
| Radnički Niš | 6,706 | 7,529 |
| NK Rijeka | 6,471 | 7,647 |
| FK Vojvodina | 6,059 | 7,059 |
| Budućnost Titograd | 5,765 | 7,588 |
| NK Osijek | 5,000 | 7,235 |
| Sloboda Tuzla | 4,941 | 7,059 |
| Dinamo Vinkovci | 4,000 | 7,000 |

- Overall league attendance per match: 9,912 spectators

== See also ==
- 1983–84 Yugoslav Second League
- 1983–84 Yugoslav Cup
