= Dragiša Binić =

Serbian footballer

- Драгиша Бинић

Member of the National Assembly of Serbia
- In office 2001–2002

Personal details
- Born: 20 October 1961 (age 65) Golubovac, PR Serbia, FPR Yugoslavia
- Party: Party of Serbian Unity (SSJ) (2000–2004)
- Occupation: Footballer; legislator
Association football career
- Height: 1.85 m (6 ft 1 in)
- Position: Striker
Senior career*
Years	Team	Apps	(Gls)
1980–1983	Napredak Kruševac	20	(3)
1983–1987	Radnički Niš	101	(20)
1987–1988	Red Star Belgrade	27	(13)
1988–1989	Brest	29	(18)
1989–1990	Levante	7	(0)
1990–1991	Red Star Belgrade	27	(14)
1991–1993	Slavia Prague	19	(8)
1993–1994	APOEL	14	(10)
1994	Nagoya Grampus Eight	8	(5)
1995	Tosu Futures	6	(5)
International career
1990–1991	Yugoslavia	3	(1)
- * Club domestic league appearances and goals

Dragiša Binić (Serbian Cyrillic: Драгиша Бинић; born 20 October 1961) is a Serbian former footballer who played for Red Star and was part of their European Cup victory in 1991. He had three caps for the Yugoslavia national football team, scoring one goal. His son Vladan Binić is also a footballer.

== Club career ==
=== Red Star Belgrade ===
In the summer 1987 transfer window, soon to be twenty-six-year old striker Binić signed with Red Star Belgrade. The move meant reuniting with his former Radnički Niš young teammate Dragan Stojković who had transferred to Red Star a year earlier and already managed to establish himself as the team star and fan favourite. Led by head coach Velibor Vasović, the ambitious Belgrade club was looking to get back on the winning track after a disappointing league season. Other arrivals to the club included the twenty-four-year-old defender Goran Jurić from Velež Mostar, twenty-two-year-old defensive midfielder Refik Šabanadžović from Željezničar Sarajevo, and talented eighteen-year-old creative midfield prospect Robert Prosinečki from Dinamo Zagreb.

With Bora Cvetković and Husref Musemić as his main competition at the forward spots, Binić looked to be settling well into the new environment alongside team regulars: midfielder Žarko Đurović, attacking midfielder Goran Milojević, midfield playmaker and emerging team leader Dragan Stojković, and defenders Slobodan Marović and Miodrag Krivokapić. Following a good start to the season with Binić scoring away at FK Priština, the combustible striker and coach Vasović quickly developed an antagonistic relationship, with Binić getting suspended from the squad over an insubordination quarrel with the coach. After missing several months of match action while only training with the team, Binić got reinstated following another reported incident with Vasović that apparently featured the striker confronting the coach in front of his private residence.

== Career statistics ==
=== Club ===
Club performance			League	
Season	Club	League	Apps	Goals
Yugoslavia			League	
1980/81	Napredak Kruševac	First League	2	0
1981/82	Napredak Kruševac	Second League	4	0
1982/83	Napredak Kruševac	Second League	14	3
1983/84	Radnički Niš	First League	19	5
1984/85	Radnički Niš	First League	27	4
1985/86	Radnički Niš	Second League	31	8
1986/87	Radnički Niš	First League	24	3
1987/88	Red Star Belgrade	First League	27	13
France			League	
1988/89	Brest	Division 2	29	18
Spain			League	
1989/90	Levante	Segunda División	7	0
Yugoslavia			League	
1990/91	Red Star Belgrade	First League	27	14
Czechoslovakia			League	
1991/92	Slavia Prague	First League	12	5
1992/93	Slavia Prague	First League	7	3
Cyprus			League	
1993/94	APOEL	First Division	14	10
Japan			League	
1994	Nagoya Grampus Eight	J1 League	8	5
1995	Tosu Futures	Football League	6	5
Country	Yugoslavia		175	50
Country	France		29	18
Country	Spain		7	0
Country	Czechoslovakia		19	8
Country	Cyprus		14	10
Country	Japan		14	10
Total			258	96

=== International ===
Yugoslavia national team
Year	Apps	Goals
1990	1	0
1991	2	1
Total	3	1

==== International goals ====
Yugoslavia score listed first, score column indicates score after each Binić goal.

International goals by date, venue, cap, opponent, score, result and competition
No.	Date	Venue	Cap	Opponent	Score	Result	Competition
1	27 March 1991	Stadion Crvena Zvezda, Belgrade, SFR Yugoslavia	2	Northern Ireland	1–0	4–1	UEFA Euro 1992 qualification

== Honours ==
Red Star Belgrade

- Yugoslav First League: 1987–88, 1990–91
- European Champion Clubs' Cup: 1990–91
