= 1980–81 Yugoslav First League =

Prva savezna liga
- Season: 1980–81
- Dates: 16 August 1980 – 14 June 1981
- Champions: Red Star (14th title)
- Relegated: Borac Banja Luka; Napredak Kruševac
- European Cup: Red Star
- Cup Winners' Cup: Velež Mostar
- UEFA Cup: Hajduk Split; Radnički Niš
- Top goalscorer: Milan Radović (26)

The 1980–81 Yugoslav First League season was the 35th season of the First Federal League (Serbo-Croatian: Prva savezna liga), the top level association football competition of SFR Yugoslavia, since its establishment in 1946. A total of 18 teams competed in the league, with the previous season's champions Red Star successfully defending their title, finishing the season two points clear of runners-up Hajduk Split.

== Teams ==
A total of eighteen teams contested the league, including sixteen sides from the 1979–80 season and two sides promoted from the 1979–80 Yugoslav Second League (YSL) as winners of the two second level divisions East and West. The league was contested in a double round robin format, with each club playing every other club twice, for a total of 34 rounds. Two points were awarded for wins and one point for draws.

Osijek and Čelik were relegated from the 1979–80 Yugoslav First League after finishing the season in bottom two places of the league table. The two clubs promoted were NK Zagreb and OFK Belgrade, returning to the top level after being relegated in the 1978–79 season.

Locations of teams' home cities in the 1980–81 Yugoslav First League

Team	Location	Federal Republic	Position in 1979–80
Borac Banja Luka	Banja Luka	SR Bosnia and Herzegovina	14th
Budućnost	Titograd	SR Montenegro	11th
Dinamo Zagreb	Zagreb	SR Croatia	12th
Hajduk Split	Split	SR Croatia	5th
Napredak Kruševac	Kruševac	SR Serbia	4th
OFK Belgrade	Belgrade	SR Serbia	—
Olimpija	Ljubljana	SR Slovenia	15th
Partizan	Belgrade	SR Serbia	13th
Radnički Niš	Niš	SR Serbia	3rd
Red Star	Belgrade	SR Serbia	1st
Rijeka	Rijeka	SR Croatia	10th
Sarajevo	Sarajevo	SR Bosnia and Herzegovina	2nd
Sloboda	Tuzla	SR Bosnia and Herzegovina	6th
Vardar	Skopje	SR Macedonia	7th
Velež	Mostar	SR Bosnia and Herzegovina	8th
Vojvodina	Novi Sad	SR Serbia	16th
NK Zagreb	Zagreb	SR Croatia	—
Željezničar	Sarajevo	SR Bosnia and Herzegovina	9th

== League table ==
Pos	Team	Pld	W	D	L	GF	GA	GD	Pts	Qualification or relegation
1	Red Star Belgrade (C)	34	15	14	5	62	31	+31	44	Qualification for European Cup first round
2	Hajduk Split	34	16	10	8	57	36	+21	42	Qualification for UEFA Cup first round
3	Radnički Niš	34	13	15	6	39	28	+11	41	Qualification for UEFA Cup first round
4	Sloboda Tuzla	34	14	8	12	46	51	−5	36	Qualification for Balkans Cup
5	Dinamo Zagreb	34	12	11	11	44	38	+6	35	
6	Budućnost	34	11	12	11	38	34	+4	34	Qualification for Intertoto Cup
7	Rijeka	34	12	10	12	50	47	+3	34	
8	Partizan	34	9	16	9	43	41	+2	34	
9	Velež	34	13	8	13	44	47	−3	34	Qualification for Cup Winners' Cup first round
10	Vojvodina	34	13	8	13	37	40	−3	34	
11	Vardar	34	11	11	12	41	48	−7	33	
12	Olimpija	34	8	16	10	29	33	−4	32	
13	Sarajevo	34	12	8	14	47	53	−6	32	
14	Željezničar	34	11	10	13	42	51	−9	32	
15	OFK Belgrade	34	8	14	12	34	39	−5	30	
16	NK Zagreb	34	11	8	15	43	55	−12	30	
17	Borac Banja Luka (R)	34	10	9	15	35	44	−9	29	Relegation to Yugoslav Second League
18	Napredak Kruševac (R)	34	9	8	17	45	60	−15	26	Relegation to Yugoslav Second League

Source: rsssf.org
Rules for classification: 1) points; 2) goal difference; 3) number of goals scored.
(C) Champions; (R) Relegated

== Results ==
Home \ Away	BOR	BUD	DIN	HAJ	NAP	OFK	OLI	PAR	RNI	RSB	RIJ	SAR	SLO	VAR	VEL	VOJ	ZAG	ŽEL
Borac Banja Luka		2–1	1–1	1–0	1–0	2–3	1–1	2–1	0–0	0–0	2–1	0–0	2–0	1–1	2–1	2–2	4–0	5–2
Budućnost	1–0		2–0	2–0	1–0	2–1	1–1	1–2	1–0	1–1	3–0	4–1	2–0	1–1	0–0	0–0	3–1	4–1
Dinamo Zagreb	1–0	2–0		2–1	5–1	0–0	1–1	2–0	0–0	0–1	1–2	3–0	2–1	3–0	5–2	3–1	1–1	1–1
Hajduk Split	2–0	4–1	3–1		3–2	4–0	3–1	1–1	3–3	1–0	2–0	3–0	1–0	1–1	1–0	3–1	1–0	3–0
Napredak Kruševac	1–0	2–1	1–1	4–2		3–2	1–1	0–2	2–2	1–1	5–0	1–0	2–3	1–1	1–1	3–1	0–1	1–0
OFK Belgrade	3–1	0–0	0–1	1–1	2–1		1–0	1–2	0–0	0–0	0–0	2–0	3–4	2–0	1–1	0–0	3–0	1–0
Olimpija	1–0	0–0	1–1	0–0	1–1	1–0		2–2	0–0	2–0	1–1	0–1	2–0	0–1	2–0	1–0	0–0	2–0
Partizan	0–0	0–0	0–0	0–4	3–1	1–1	2–2		0–1	3–1	1–0	1–1	2–2	2–2	0–0	0–1	4–1	0–0
Radnički Niš	2–1	1–0	0–2	3–1	4–1	2–0	1–0	0–0		1–1	3–1	2–1	0–1	2–1	1–0	0–0	4–0	2–1
Red Star	4–1	1–1	0–0	1–3	2–0	1–1	6–0	1–1	0–0		2–1	3–1	9–1	2–0	3–0	2–1	2–0	4–0
Rijeka	0–1	0–0	3–0	2–2	1–0	0–0	1–1	2–1	3–0	3–2		2–0	1–1	3–1	5–1	3–1	0–0	1–1
Sarajevo	3–0	2–1	3–1	1–1	4–3	4–2	1–1	1–1	1–1	2–2	2–1		2–1	3–0	0–2	2–0	3–0	1–2
Sloboda Tuzla	2–0	2–1	1–0	1–1	5–1	2–1	2–1	2–1	2–0	1–1	1–3	3–2		2–1	2–1	0–1	1–1	1–1
Vardar	2–0	0–0	1–0	3–1	1–1	0–0	2–1	1–3	1–1	2–4	3–0	3–1	0–0		2–1	2–1	2–0	2–1
Velež	2–1	2–0	4–2	1–0	3–1	1–1	1–1	2–1	0–0	0–0	4–3	0–1	1–0	2–1		1–0	3–1	1–3
Vojvodina	2–0	2–1	1–0	0–0	2–1	1–1	0–1	2–2	1–0	1–2	2–1	2–0	1–1	3–1	2–1		1–0	3–1
NK Zagreb	1–1	4–1	1–1	2–0	3–1	2–0	1–0	2–3	2–2	1–1	3–6	3–1	2–1	3–0	2–1	4–1		1–2
Željezničar	3–1	1–1	4–1	1–1	0–1	2–1	1–0	2–1	1–1	1–2	0–0	2–2	2–0	2–2	2–4	1–0	1–0	

Source: DataSoccer.it
Legend: Blue = home team win; Yellow = draw; Red = away team win.

== Winning squad ==
Champions: Red Star Belgrade
Player	League	
Player	Matches	Goals
(Socialist Federal Republic of Yugoslavia) Rajko Janjanin	34	6
(Socialist Federal Republic of Yugoslavia) Srebrenko Repčić	33	10
(Socialist Federal Republic of Yugoslavia) Zlatko Krmpotić	32	1
(Socialist Federal Republic of Yugoslavia) Miloš Šestić	31	7
(Socialist Federal Republic of Yugoslavia) Milan Janković	30	5
(Socialist Federal Republic of Yugoslavia) Zdravko Borovnica	29	12
(Socialist Federal Republic of Yugoslavia) Ivan Jurišić	27	1
(Socialist Federal Republic of Yugoslavia) Boško Đurovski	26	0
(Socialist Federal Republic of Yugoslavia) Vladimir "Pižon" Petrović	23	6
(Socialist Federal Republic of Yugoslavia) Dragan Miletović	23	0
(Socialist Federal Republic of Yugoslavia) Živan Ljukovčan (goalkeeper)	17	0
(Socialist Federal Republic of Yugoslavia) Milan Jovin	16	2
(Socialist Federal Republic of Yugoslavia) Cvijetin Blagojević	16	2
(Socialist Federal Republic of Yugoslavia) Dragan Simeunović (goalkeeper)	16	0
(Socialist Federal Republic of Yugoslavia) Milenko Rajković	14	0
(Socialist Federal Republic of Yugoslavia) Ljubiša Stojanović	12	0
(Socialist Federal Republic of Yugoslavia) Radomir Savić	12	0
(Socialist Federal Republic of Yugoslavia) Zoran Jelikić	10	1
(Socialist Federal Republic of Yugoslavia) Slavoljub Muslin	10	0
(Socialist Federal Republic of Yugoslavia) Milko Đurovski	9	5
(Socialist Federal Republic of Yugoslavia) Nedeljko Milosavljević	6	2
(Socialist Federal Republic of Yugoslavia) Slobodan Goračinov	2	0
(Socialist Federal Republic of Yugoslavia) Zdravko Čakalić	2	0
(Socialist Federal Republic of Yugoslavia) Srboljub Stamenković	1	0
(Socialist Federal Republic of Yugoslavia) Goran Živanović	1	0
(Socialist Federal Republic of Yugoslavia) Slavko Radovanović	1	0
(Socialist Federal Republic of Yugoslavia) Srboljub Marinković	1	0
Head coach: Branko Stanković

== Top scorers ==
Rank	Scorer	Club	Goals
1	(Socialist Federal Republic of Yugoslavia) Milan Radović	Rijeka	26
2	(Socialist Federal Republic of Yugoslavia) Mojaš Radonjić	Budučnost	16
3	(Socialist Federal Republic of Yugoslavia) Dragoljub Kostić	Napredak Kruševac	15
4	(Socialist Federal Republic of Yugoslavia) Zvonko Živković	Partizan	14
5	(Socialist Federal Republic of Yugoslavia) Abid Kovačević	Dinamo Zagreb	13
5	(Socialist Federal Republic of Yugoslavia) Slavko Kovačić	NK Zagreb	13
5	(Socialist Federal Republic of Yugoslavia) Davor Čop	Napredak Kruševac	13
8	(Socialist Federal Republic of Yugoslavia) Zdravko Borovnica	Red Star	12
8	(Socialist Federal Republic of Yugoslavia) Dragan Vujović	Budučnost	12
10	(Socialist Federal Republic of Yugoslavia) Zlatko Vujović	Hajduk Split	11
10	(Socialist Federal Republic of Yugoslavia) Vahid Halilhodžić	Velež	11
10	(Socialist Federal Republic of Yugoslavia) Vasil Ringov	Vardar	11

== See also ==
- 1980–81 Yugoslav Second League
- 1980–81 Yugoslav Cup
