= 1987–88 Yugoslav First League =

Prva savezna liga
- Season: 1987–88
- Dates: 2 August 1987 – 12 June 1988
- Champions: Red Star (16th title)
- Relegated: Sutjeska; Priština
- European Cup: Red Star
- Cup Winners' Cup: Borac Banja Luka
- UEFA Cup: Partizan; Velež; Dinamo Zagreb
- Top goalscorer: Duško Milinković (16)

The 1987–88 Yugoslav First League season was the 42nd season of the First Federal League (Serbo-Croatian: Prva savezna liga), the top level association football competition of SFR Yugoslavia, since its establishment in 1946. The season began on 2 August 1987 and ended on 12 June 1988. Red Star led by Velibor Vasović won their 16th title with a single points ahead of previous season's champions Partizan.

== Teams ==
A total of eighteen teams contested the league, including sixteen sides from the 1986–87 season and two sides promoted from the 1986–87 Yugoslav Second League (YSL) as winners of the two second level groups East and West. The league was contested in a double round robin format, with each club playing every other club twice, for a total of 34 rounds. Two points were awarded for wins and one point for draws.

Dinamo Vinkovci and Spartak were relegated from the 1986–87 Yugoslav First League after finishing the season in bottom two places of the league table. The two clubs promoted to top level were Vojvodina and Rad.

Rank in 1986–87	Team	City	SR	Stadium	Managers in 1987–88
7th	Budućnost	Titograd	(Socialist Republic of Montenegro) MNE	Pod Goricom	Stanko Poklepović
12th	Čelik	Zenica	(Socialist Republic of Bosnia and Herzegovina) BIH	Bilino Polje	Josip Skoblar
6th	Dinamo Zagreb	Zagreb	(Socialist Republic of Croatia) CRO	Maksimir	Miroslav Blažević
8th	Hajduk Split	Split	(Socialist Republic of Croatia) CRO	Poljud	Ivan Vutsov; Petar Nadoveza
11th	Osijek	Osijek	(Socialist Republic of Croatia) CRO	Gradski Vrt	Šaban Jasenica
1st	Partizan	Belgrade	(Socialist Republic of Serbia) SRB	Stadion JNA	Fahrudin Jusufi
14th	Priština	Pristina	(Socialist Republic of Serbia) SRB	Gradski	Josip Duvančić
—N/a	Rad	Belgrade	(Socialist Republic of Serbia) SRB	Karaburma	Dragan Gugleta
16th	Radnički Niš	Niš	(Socialist Republic of Serbia) SRB	Čair	Milan Živadinović
3rd	Red Star	Belgrade	(Socialist Republic of Serbia) SRB	Marakana	Velibor Vasović
4th	Rijeka	Rijeka	(Socialist Republic of Croatia) CRO	Kantrida	Mladen Vranković
13th	Sarajevo	Sarajevo	(Socialist Republic of Bosnia and Herzegovina) BIH	Koševo	Denijal Pirić
15th	Sloboda	Tuzla	(Socialist Republic of Bosnia and Herzegovina) BIH	Tušanj	Đorđe Gerum
10th	Sutjeska	Nikšić	(Socialist Republic of Montenegro) MNE	Kraj Bistrice	Nedeljko Gugolj
5th	Vardar	Skopje	(Socialist Republic of Macedonia) MKD	Gradski	Andon Dončevski
2nd	Velež	Mostar	(Socialist Republic of Bosnia and Herzegovina) BIH	Pod Bijelim Brijegom	Enver Marić
—N/a	Vojvodina	Novi Sad	(Socialist Republic of Serbia) SRB	FK Vojvodina	Ivica Brzić
9th	Željezničar	Sarajevo	(Socialist Republic of Bosnia and Herzegovina) BIH	Grbavica	Blagoje Bratić

== League table ==
Pos	Team	Pld	W	D	L	GF	GA	GD	Pts	Qualification or relegation
1	Red Star Belgrade (C)	34	17	11	6	66	39	+27	45	Qualification for European Cup first round
2	Partizan	34	17	10	7	62	37	+25	44	Qualification for UEFA Cup first round
3	Velež	34	15	12	7	61	34	+27	42	Qualification for UEFA Cup first round
4	Dinamo Zagreb	34	16	10	8	55	36	+19	42	Qualification for UEFA Cup first round
5	Sloboda Tuzla	34	14	10	10	53	41	+12	38	
6	Vardar	34	15	7	12	37	40	−3	37	
7	Radnički Niš	34	14	4	16	48	46	+2	32	Qualification for Balkans Cup
8	Rijeka	34	9	14	11	33	39	−6	32	
9	Budućnost	34	10	12	12	40	48	−8	32	
10	Vojvodina	34	11	10	13	40	51	−11	32	Qualification for Intertoto Cup
11	Osijek	34	10	11	13	44	61	−17	31	
12	Željezničar	34	8	14	12	38	44	−6	30	
13	Hajduk Split	34	8	14	12	40	50	−10	30	
14	Sarajevo	34	11	8	15	37	47	−10	30	
15	Rad	34	11	8	15	44	56	−12	30	Qualification for Intertoto Cup
16	Čelik	34	12	5	17	39	45	−6	29	
17	Sutjeska Nikšić (R)	34	10	9	15	42	49	−7	29	Relegation to Yugoslav Second League
18	Priština (R)	34	10	7	17	43	59	−16	27	Relegation to Yugoslav Second League

Source: rsssf.org
Rules for classification: 1) points; 2) goal difference; 3) number of goals scored.
(C) Champions; (R) Relegated

== Results ==
Home \ Away	BUD	ČEL	DIN	HAJ	OSI	PAR	PRI	RAD	RNI	RSB	RIJ	SAR	SLO	SUT	VAR	VEL	VOJ	ŽEL
Budućnost		2–1	3–3	2–0	2–0	0–3	2–1	4–1	3–1	1–1	1–0	0–0	3–0	2–2	3–0	1–1	1–2	1–1
Čelik	2–0		1–1	3–0	3–0	0–0	0–0	2–1	1–0	1–0	0–3	2–0	3–2	3–1	0–1	1–1	1–1	3–0
Dinamo Zagreb	2–1	2–0		1–1	3–1	1–2	1–2	3–1	1–0	1–0	3–2	4–1	2–1	2–1	3–1	3–0	5–0	3–0
Hajduk Split	1–2	3–2	0–2		2–1	2–0	3–1	2–1	1–0	2–2	3–0	5–1	2–2	0–0	0–0	2–2	2–2	0–0
Osijek	1–0	3–0	1–1	1–1		4–1	5–1	3–2	0–0	2–2	1–0	2–1	1–1	1–0	5–3	2–1	1–1	2–2
Partizan	2–0	0–1	2–1	3–0	6–1		3–1	5–1	1–0	2–3	1–1	1–0	5–2	1–0	1–1	1–0	1–0	0–0
Priština	4–0	2–3	0–0	1–1	4–2	0–0		0–2	1–0	2–3	2–1	5–2	0–3	3–0	0–0	3–1	2–0	3–0
Rad	1–1	3–2	0–3	2–0	3–1	3–3	1–0		3–1	0–2	1–0	3–2	1–1	3–1	1–0	2–2	2–2	2–1
Radnički Niš	3–1	2–0	3–1	2–1	3–0	1–4	2–0	1–1		3–2	2–1	2–0	2–1	3–0	2–2	3–2	5–1	1–0
Red Star	2–2	1–0	0–0	1–1	6–1	1–1	7–1	2–0	4–2		2–3	3–0	3–1	3–1	2–0	3–1	3–2	2–0
Rijeka	0–0	2–1	0–0	3–1	0–0	0–3	2–1	0–0	2–1	0–0		2–1	1–1	1–0	3–0	1–1	1–1	0–0
Sarajevo	0–0	2–1	1–0	2–0	3–0	2–2	2–0	1–0	1–0	0–0	1–1		0–0	2–0	4–0	0–1	4–1	2–0
Sloboda Tuzla	3–0	4–1	1–1	1–1	4–0	3–1	1–1	1–0	3–0	0–2	2–0	1–0		1–0	0–2	0–0	2–0	4–0
Sutjeska	1–1	2–1	3–0	3–1	0–0	1–1	1–1	0–0	2–1	2–2	3–0	3–1	2–0		3–0	2–3	2–0	2–0
Vardar	3–0	2–0	4–0	1–1	1–0	2–1	1–0	2–0	1–0	1–0	0–0	0–0	1–3	2–0		1–0	2–0	1–1
Velež	1–0	1–0	0–0	3–1	2–0	1–1	5–0	4–1	3–1	5–0	1–1	4–0	3–0	3–3	5–0		1–0	2–0
Vojvodina	0–0	1–0	3–2	0–0	1–1	1–0	3–0	2–1	2–1	0–1	2–2	3–0	2–0	4–1	0–2	1–1		2–1
Željezničar	5–1	2–0	0–0	3–0	1–1	3–3	2–1	2–1	0–0	1–1	3–0	1–1	3–3	3–0	0–2	0–0	3–0	

Source: DataSoccer.it
Legend: Blue = home team win; Yellow = draw; Red = away team win.

== Winning squad ==
Champions: Red Star Belgrade
Player	League	
Player	Matches	Goals
(Socialist Federal Republic of Yugoslavia) Žarko Đurović	34	5
(Socialist Federal Republic of Yugoslavia) Goran Milojević	33	3
(Socialist Federal Republic of Yugoslavia) Bora Cvetković	32	9
(Socialist Federal Republic of Yugoslavia) Slobodan Marović	30	1
(Socialist Federal Republic of Yugoslavia) Miodrag Krivokapić	30	0
(Socialist Federal Republic of Yugoslavia) Dragan "Piksi" Stojković	28	15
(Socialist Federal Republic of Yugoslavia) Dragiša Binić	27	13
(Socialist Federal Republic of Yugoslavia) Slavko Radovanović	25	5
(Socialist Federal Republic of Yugoslavia) Robert Prosinečki	23	4
(Socialist Federal Republic of Yugoslavia) Goran Jurić	23	0
(Socialist Federal Republic of Yugoslavia) Stevan Stojanović (goalkeeper)	23	0
(Socialist Federal Republic of Yugoslavia) Dejan Joksimović	17	3
(Socialist Federal Republic of Yugoslavia) Zlatko Krdžević	17	0
(Socialist Federal Republic of Yugoslavia) Dragić Komadina	16	1
(Socialist Federal Republic of Yugoslavia) Husref Musemić	15	4
(Socialist Federal Republic of Yugoslavia) Dragan Punišić	11	1
(Socialist Federal Republic of Yugoslavia) Branko Davidović (goalkeeper)	11	0
(Socialist Federal Republic of Yugoslavia) Refik Šabanadžović	10	1
(Socialist Federal Republic of Yugoslavia) Jovica Nikolić	10	0
(Socialist Federal Republic of Yugoslavia) Mitar Mrkela	5	0
(Socialist Federal Republic of Yugoslavia) Vladan Lukić	2	1
(Socialist Federal Republic of Yugoslavia) Slavoljub Janković	2	0
Head coach: Velibor Vasović

== Top scorers ==
The top goalscorers in the 1987–88 Yugoslav First League were as follows:

Rank	Player	Club	Goals
1	(Socialist Federal Republic of Yugoslavia) Duško Milinković	Rad	16
2	(Socialist Federal Republic of Yugoslavia) Mirko Mihić	Sloboda	15
2	(Socialist Federal Republic of Yugoslavia) Dragan Stojković	Red Star	15
2	(Socialist Federal Republic of Yugoslavia) Kujtim Shala	Priština	15
5	(Socialist Federal Republic of Yugoslavia) Haris Škoro	Dinamo Zagreb	14
6	(Socialist Federal Republic of Yugoslavia) Dragiša Binić	Red Star	13
6	(Socialist Federal Republic of Yugoslavia) Semir Tuce	Velež	13
6	(Socialist Federal Republic of Yugoslavia) Zvonimir Boban	Dinamo Zagreb	13
6	(Socialist Federal Republic of Yugoslavia) Darko Pančev	Vardar	13
10	(Socialist Federal Republic of Yugoslavia) Radmilo Mihajlović	Željezničar	12
10	(Socialist Federal Republic of Yugoslavia) Dragan Jakovljević	Sarajevo	12
10	(Socialist Federal Republic of Yugoslavia) Vladislav Đukić	Priština (6) / Partizan (6)	12

== See also ==
- 1987–88 Yugoslav Second League
- 1987–88 Yugoslav Cup
- 1987–88 NK Dinamo Zagreb season
