= 1979–80 Yugoslav First League =

Yugoslav First League
- Season: 1979–80
- Dates: 15 July 1979 – 29 June 1980
- Champions: Red Star (13th title)
- Relegated: Osijek; Čelik
- European Cup: Red Star
- Cup Winners' Cup: Dinamo Zagreb
- UEFA Cup: Sarajevo; Radnički Niš; Napredak Kruševac
- Matches played: 272
- Top goalscorer: Safet Sušić; Dragoljub Kostić (17 goals each)

The 1979–80 Yugoslav First League was won by Red Star Belgrade.

== Teams ==
A total of eighteen teams contested the league, including sixteen sides from the 1978–79 season and two sides promoted from the 1978–79 Yugoslav Second League (YSL) as winners of the two second level divisions East and West. The league was contested in a double round robin format, with each club playing every other club twice, for a total of 34 rounds. Two points were awarded for wins and one point for draws.

NK Zagreb and OFK Belgrade were relegated from the 1978–79 Yugoslav First League after finishing the season in bottom two places of the league table. The two clubs promoted to top level were Vardar and Čelik.

Locations of teams' home cities in the 1979–80 Yugoslav First League

Team	Location	Federal Republic	Position in 1978–79
Borac Banja Luka	Banja Luka	SR Bosnia and Herzegovina	11th
Budućnost Titograd	Titograd	SR Montenegro	6th
Čelik	Zenica	SR Bosnia and Herzegovina	—
Dinamo Zagreb	Zagreb	SR Croatia	2nd
Hajduk Split	Split	SR Croatia	1st
Napredak Kruševac	Kruševac	SR Serbia	14th
Olimpija	Ljubljana	SR Slovenia	16th
Osijek	Osijek	SR Croatia	13th
Partizan	Belgrade	SR Serbia	15th
Radnički Niš	Niš	SR Serbia	7th
Red Star	Belgrade	SR Serbia	3rd
Rijeka	Rijeka	SR Croatia	10th
Sarajevo	Sarajevo	SR Bosnia and Herzegovina	4th
Sloboda	Tuzla	SR Bosnia and Herzegovina	8th
Vardar	Skopje	SR Macedonia	—
Velež	Mostar	SR Bosnia and Herzegovina	5th
Vojvodina	Novi Sad	SR Serbia	12th
Željezničar	Sarajevo	SR Bosnia and Herzegovina	9th

== Events and incidents ==
=== Week 25: Death of Marshal Tito, three matches abandoned ===
==== Hajduk v. Red Star Belgrade ====
The season's week 25 derby match, pitting reigning league champions Hajduk versus current league leaders Red Star, on 4 May 1980 at Poljud Stadium in Split was abandoned in the 41st minute due to the announcement of the death of Marshal Tito that was followed by a mass display of public grief within the stadium by fans and players alike.

Played on a Sunday afternoon, the televised contest was in the 41st minute when three men entered the pitch, signalling to the referee—Husref Muharemagić of Janja—to stop the match and gather players of both teams in the centre circle. With the contest halted, Split mayor Ante Skataretiko took to the stadium's public address system to formally announce to the 50,000+ crowd that the Yugoslav lifetime president Josip Broz Tito had died. The match score was tied at 1–1 at the time of abandonment with Pižon Petrović scoring on a penalty kick for 0-1 before Zlatko Vujović's 1-1 equalizer. Incidentally, the match was the first time Red Star Belgrade played a competitive match at the newly built Poljud Stadium that had opened the previous summer.

Sudden scenes of mass crying at the stadium followed Skataretiko's announcement; some players—such as Hajduk's twenty-one-year-old striker Zlatko Vujović—collapsed down to the ground and weeped as the crowd launched into a rendition of "Druže Tito, mi ti se kunemo" ('Comrade Tito, We Give You Our Word'), a popular personality cult song professing loyalty and devotion to Comrade Tito.

The Yugoslav Football Association (FSJ) declared the match null and void, ordering a replay for Wednesday, 21 May 1980 at the same venue. Two and a half weeks later, Red Star won the derby replay 3–1.

==== FK Sarajevo v. NK Osijek ====
Meanwhile, at Koševo Stadium during the FK Sarajevo vs. NK Osijek match, the news of Tito's death broke in the 43rd minute with the contest locked at 1-1.

==== Dinamo Zagreb v. FK Željezničar ====
The matches – along with a third between Dinamo and Zeljeznicar – were immediately abandoned, with the decision being made by the Yugoslav FA to declare the matches null and void, and order replays two and a half weeks later on Wednesday, 21 May 1980 at the same stadiums.

== League table ==
Pos	Team	Pld	W	D	L	GF	GA	GD	Pts	Qualification or relegation
1	Red Star Belgrade (C)	34	19	10	5	54	26	+28	48	Qualification for European Cup first round
2	Sarajevo	34	17	7	10	55	41	+14	41	Qualification for UEFA Cup first round
3	Radnički Niš	34	14	11	9	49	32	+17	39	Qualification for UEFA Cup first round
4	Napredak Kruševac	34	13	13	8	41	27	+14	39	Qualification for UEFA Cup first round
5	Hajduk Split	34	15	8	11	53	44	+9	38	
6	Sloboda Tuzla	34	13	9	12	44	37	+7	35	
7	Vardar	34	10	15	9	43	41	+2	35	
8	Velež	34	13	8	13	44	39	+5	34	Qualification for Balkans Cup
9	Željezničar	34	9	15	10	41	47	−6	33	
10	Rijeka	34	12	9	13	34	47	−13	33	
11	Budućnost	34	10	12	12	34	34	0	32	
12	Dinamo Zagreb	34	9	14	11	43	44	−1	32	Qualification for Cup Winners' Cup first round
13	Partizan	34	10	12	12	31	37	−6	32	
14	Borac Banja Luka	34	11	8	15	34	42	−8	30	
15	Olimpija	34	11	8	15	30	45	−15	30	
16	Vojvodina	34	12	6	16	33	53	−20	30	
17	Osijek (R)	34	10	9	15	28	34	−6	29	Relegation to Yugoslav Second League
18	Čelik (R)	34	5	12	17	22	43	−21	22	Relegation to Yugoslav Second League

Source: rsssf.org
Rules for classification: 1) points; 2) goal difference; 3) number of goals scored.
(C) Champions; (R) Relegated

== Results ==
Home \ Away	BOR	BUD	ČEL	DIN	HAJ	NAP	OLI	OSI	PAR	RNI	RSB	RIJ	SAR	SLO	VAR	VEL	VOJ	ŽEL
Borac Banja Luka		3–1	2–1	2–0	0–0	2–0	1–0	1–1	1–0	2–0	1–1	3–0	0–2	1–0	3–0	4–2	1–1	1–1
Budućnost	3–0		0–0	1–1	3–1	0–0	1–0	2–0	2–0	2–1	2–0	1–2	0–2	0–0	1–1	2–0	3–1	3–0
Čelik	1–0	3–0		2–2	1–3	1–1	2–3	2–1	1–1	1–0	0–0	1–0	0–1	0–0	0–2	0–0	0–1	2–3
Dinamo Zagreb	0–0	0–0	0–0		1–0	0–3	0–0	1–0	5–1	1–1	2–2	5–1	2–2	2–1	2–2	2–1	4–1	4–1
Hajduk Split	3–0	1–0	3–0	1–1		3–1	3–0	2–1	4–1	2–3	1–3	4–1	1–0	2–1	0–0	2–0	2–2	2–2
Napredak Kruševac	1–0	2–0	0–0	3–0	2–2		3–0	3–0	1–0	0–0	1–2	5–1	2–0	1–1	0–0	0–0	2–1	0–0
Olimpija	3–0	0–0	1–0	3–1	0–1	0–2		2–0	2–0	2–0	1–0	0–1	2–1	0–0	1–1	3–1	3–0	0–0
Osijek	2–1	0–0	0–0	1–0	0–0	0–1	4–0		1–0	2–0	1–1	2–0	2–3	1–1	1–0	2–1	2–0	2–0
Partizan	3–1	1–1	0–0	1–0	3–0	0–0	3–1	0–0		1–1	0–0	2–0	2–0	2–0	3–2	0–1	0–0	3–0
Radnički Niš	1–1	2–0	4–1	0–1	4–0	2–0	4–0	2–0	1–0		1–1	2–0	1–0	1–0	0–0	2–1	5–1	3–0
Red Star	2–0	1–0	1–0	2–1	0–1	0–0	2–1	3–0	2–0	1–0		3–0	4–1	1–0	2–1	0–3	7–1	2–1
Rijeka	0–0	2–0	1–0	2–0	2–0	2–1	2–0	0–0	0–0	0–0	2–2		1–1	1–0	4–0	1–0	1–1	2–2
Sarajevo	1–0	2–2	2–2	4–2	4–2	0–1	6–0	2–1	2–2	2–0	2–1	2–0		2–1	3–0	1–0	1–0	1–3
Sloboda Tuzla	2–1	2–1	1–0	0–0	3–1	5–2	2–0	1–0	2–0	2–2	1–1	0–1	4–2		5–2	2–0	2–0	3–1
Vardar	5–2	1–1	2–0	1–1	1–0	2–1	2–2	1–0	5–0	2–2	0–0	3–1	0–0	2–0		0–1	2–0	1–1
Velež	2–0	2–1	5–1	1–1	2–1	1–1	0–0	1–0	0–0	1–1	0–2	3–1	1–2	5–1	2–2		2–1	3–0
Vojvodina	1–0	0–0	1–0	2–1	1–4	1–0	2–0	2–0	1–2	1–1	1–2	3–1	1–0	1–0	2–0	0–1		2–1
Željezničar	2–0	3–1	2–0	2–0	1–1	1–1	0–0	1–1	0–0	4–2	0–3	1–1	1–1	1–1	0–0	3–1	3–0	

Source: DataSoccer.it
Legend: Blue = home team win; Yellow = draw; Red = away team win.

== Winning squad ==
Champions: Red Star Belgrade
Player	League	
Player	Matches	Goals
(Socialist Federal Republic of Yugoslavia) Srebrenko Repčić	33	7
(Socialist Federal Republic of Yugoslavia) Cvijetin Blagojević	31	2
(Socialist Federal Republic of Yugoslavia) Milan Jovin	31	1
(Socialist Federal Republic of Yugoslavia) Dušan Savić	28	11
(Socialist Federal Republic of Yugoslavia) Vladimir Petrović	28	5
(Socialist Federal Republic of Yugoslavia) Miloš Šestić	28	4
(Socialist Federal Republic of Yugoslavia) Zlatko Krmpotić	25	0
(Socialist Federal Republic of Yugoslavia) Zoran Filipović	24	6
(Socialist Federal Republic of Yugoslavia) Zdravko Borovnica	24	0
(Socialist Federal Republic of Yugoslavia) Nedeljko Milosavljević	23	3
(Socialist Federal Republic of Yugoslavia) Živan Ljukovčan (goalkeeper)	23	0
(Socialist Federal Republic of Yugoslavia) Ivan Jurišić	19	0
(Socialist Federal Republic of Yugoslavia) Dragan Miletović	18	0
(Socialist Federal Republic of Yugoslavia) Dušan Nikolić	16	1
(Socialist Federal Republic of Yugoslavia) Slavoljub Muslin	15	0
(Socialist Federal Republic of Yugoslavia) Đorđe Milovanović	14	3
(Socialist Federal Republic of Yugoslavia) Boško Đurovski	14	1
(Socialist Federal Republic of Yugoslavia) Nikola Jovanović	14	0
(Socialist Federal Republic of Yugoslavia) Aleksandar Stojanović (goalkeeper)	11	0
(Socialist Federal Republic of Yugoslavia) Radomir Savić	9	3
(Socialist Federal Republic of Yugoslavia) Srboljub Stamenković	1	0
(Socialist Federal Republic of Yugoslavia) Zoran Mitić	1	0
(Socialist Federal Republic of Yugoslavia) Borisav Mitrović	1	0
Head coach: Branko Stanković

== Top scorers ==
Rank	Scorer	Club	Goals
1	(Socialist Federal Republic of Yugoslavia) Safet Sušić	Sarajevo	17
1	(Socialist Federal Republic of Yugoslavia) Dragoljub Kostić	Napredak Kruševac	17
3	(Socialist Federal Republic of Yugoslavia) Zlatko Kranjčar	Dinamo Zagreb	14
4	(Socialist Federal Republic of Yugoslavia) Dušan Savić	Red Star	13
5	(Socialist Federal Republic of Yugoslavia) Mersad Kovačević	Sloboda Tuzla	12
5	(Socialist Federal Republic of Yugoslavia) Dragan Okuka	Velež	12
5	(Socialist Federal Republic of Yugoslavia) Ranko Đorđić	Čelik	12
8	(Socialist Federal Republic of Yugoslavia) Zlatko Vujović	Hajduk Split	11
9	(Socialist Federal Republic of Yugoslavia) Vasil Ringov	Vardar	10
9	(Socialist Federal Republic of Yugoslavia) Milan Radović	Rijeka	10
9	(Socialist Federal Republic of Yugoslavia) Dragan Vujović	Budućnost	10

== See also ==
- 1979–80 Yugoslav Second League
- 1979–80 Yugoslav Cup
