= Đorđe Milovanović =

Serbian footballer

- Milovanović with Red Star Belgrade during the 1970s-1980s

Personal information
- Date of birth: 13 September 1956
- Place of birth: Sremska Rača, FPR Yugoslavia
- Date of death: 15 February 2009 (aged 52)
- Place of death: Sremska Mitrovica, Serbia
- Position: Midfielder

Senior career*
Years	Team	Apps	(Gls)
- Radnik Bijeljina
1978–1985	Red Star Belgrade	166	(12)
1985–1986	Austria Salzburg		
1986–1987	Kremser SC		
- * Club domestic league appearances and goals

Đorđe Milovanović (Serbian Cyrillic: Ђорђе Миловановић; 13 September 1956 – 15 February 2009) was a Yugoslav and later Serbian professional footballer who played as a midfielder.

== Personal life ==
Milovanović was nicknamed Đoka Bomba (the Bomb) for his thunderous shooting ability. His son Dejan was also a professional footballer. His maternal nephew is Branislav Ivanović.

== Honours ==
=== Player ===
Red Star Belgrade

- Yugoslav First League: 1979–80, 1980–81, 1983–84
- Yugoslav Cup: 1981–82, 1984–85
