= List of Samsunspor seasons =

The list of Samsunspor seasons compiles all seasons of Samsunspor from its foundation in 1927 to the present day. Samsunspor was formed in 1927 through the merger of two local clubs in Samsun, Türk Ocağı Sports Department and Al Yıldız İdman Ocağı. Until 1965, the club only participated in local competitions and did not compete in national tournaments.

Between 1927 and 1965, Samsunspor competed in the regional leagues of Samsun. Starting from the 1965–66 season, the club began competing professionally in national leagues such as the Süper Lig, 1st League, and 2nd League. In addition to league participation, the club also played in national cup tournaments like the Turkish Cup, Prime Minister’s Cup, and the Youth and Sports Ministry Cup. Samsunspor also represented Turkey in the UEFA Intertoto Cup, marking its presence in European competition. Throughout its history, the club won the 1st League championship seven times and also claimed the Youth and Sports Ministry Cup title.

Since joining professional leagues in the 1965–66 season, Samsunspor has played 30 seasons in the top-tier Süper Lig, ranking as the 10th team with the most points collected in the league’s all-time standings. Having spent 27 seasons in the 1st League, the club won the title a record seven times, making it the most successful club in the division’s history. Samsunspor has also been relegated from the Süper Lig seven times, the most in league history.

In the 2018–19 season, the club competed in the 2nd League for the first time in its history. Samsunspor won the championship in the following season and was promoted to the upper division.

== Results of league and cup competitions by season ==
| Season | League table | | | | | | | | | Turkish Cup | UEFA | Top scorer | |
| Season | League | Pos | Pld | W | D | L | GF | GA | Pts | Turkish Cup | UEFA | Player | Goals |
|---|---|---|---|---|---|---|---|---|---|---|---|---|---|
| 1965–66 | 1.Lig | 5. | 20 | 8 | 5 | 7 | 14 | 16 | 21 | 2R | | Ali Kandil | 6 |
| 1966–67 | 1.Lig | 2. | 30 | 13 | 13 | 4 | 32 | 17 | 43 | SD | | Yücel Acun | 10 |
| 1967–68 | 1.Lig | 2. | 38 | 24 | 6 | 8 | 64 | 27 | 54 | 1R | | Rıfat Usta | 17 |
| 1968–69 | 1.Lig | 1. | 34 | 21 | 7 | 6 | 51 | 15 | 49 | 1R | | Abidin Akmanol | 18 |
| 1969–70 | Süper Lig | 6. | 30 | 11 | 9 | 10 | 24 | 28 | 31 | 2R | | Ahmet Şahin | 6 |
| 1970–71 | Süper Lig | 10. | 30 | 10 | 9 | 11 | 29 | 33 | 29 | 1R | | Temel Keskindemir | 8 |
| 1971–72 | Süper Lig | 13. | 30 | 5 | 15 | 10 | 14 | 21 | 25 | 1R | | Temel Keskindemir | 4 |
| 1972–73 | Süper Lig | 12. | 30 | 8 | 10 | 12 | 21 | 40 | 26 | – | | Adem Kurukaya | 8 |
| 1973–74 | Süper Lig | 8. | 30 | 10 | 8 | 12 | 24 | 30 | 28 | – | | Temel Keskindemir | 8 |
| 1974–75 | Süper Lig | 15. | 30 | 7 | 10 | 13 | 24 | 31 | 24 | 2R | | Adem Kurukaya | 10 |
| 1975–76 | 1.Lig | 1. | 30 | 17 | 9 | 4 | 42 | 16 | 43 | SR | | Temel Keskindemir | 15 |
| 1976–77 | Süper Lig | 10. | 30 | 8 | 12 | 10 | 19 | 22 | 28 | 3R | | Naim Anuştekin | 6 |
| 1977–78 | Süper Lig | 14. | 30 | 8 | 8 | 14 | 26 | 36 | 24 | ~~B~~ | | Ercan Albay | 10 |
| 1978–79 | Süper Lig | 15. | 30 | 6 | 8 | 16 | 18 | 37 | 20 | ~~B~~ | | Adem Kurukaya | 9 |
| 1979–80 | 1.Lig | 3. | 30 | 14 | 8 | 8 | 34 | 20 | 36 | 5R | | Hakkı Bayrak | 9 |
| 1980–81 | 1.Lig | 2. | 30 | 16 | 7 | 7 | 42 | 27 | 39 | 6R | | Murat Şimşek | 13 |
| 1981–82 | 1.Lig | 1. | 28 | 15 | 8 | 5 | 48 | 17 | 38 | QF | | Tanju Çolak | 12 |
| 1982–83 | Süper Lig | 16. | 34 | 10 | 8 | 16 | 37 | 49 | 28 | 6R | | Tanju Çolak | 16 |
| 1983–84 | 1.Lig | 3. | 30 | 17 | 9 | 4 | 56 | 22 | 43 | 2R | | Tanju Çolak | 24 |
| 1984–85 | 1.Lig | 1. | 32 | 21 | 9 | 2 | 49 | 15 | 51 | 6R | | Tanju Çolak | 25 |
| 1985–86 | Süper Lig | 3. | 36 | 19 | 10 | 7 | 57 | 25 | 48 | 5R | | Tanju Çolak | 33 |
| 1986–87 | Süper Lig | 3. | 36 | 19 | 11 | 6 | 56 | 22 | 49 | SF | | Tanju Çolak | 25 |
| 1987–88 | Süper Lig | 4. | 38 | 17 | 9 | 12 | 43 | 41 | 60 | RU | | Yücel Çolak | 10 |
| 1988–89 | Süper Lig | 19. | 36 | 4 | 7 | 25 | 12 | 70 | 19 | 3R | | Erol Dinler | 5 |
| 1989–90 | Süper Lig | 16. | 34 | 7 | 6 | 21 | 20 | 50 | 27 | 3R | | Duško Milinković | 4 |
| 1990–91 | 1.Lig | 1. | 34 | 23 | 9 | 2 | 74 | 24 | 78 | 6R | | Adnan Medjedović | 17 |
| 1991–92 | Süper Lig | 16. | 30 | 4 | 6 | 20 | 36 | 62 | 18 | 6R | | Duško Milinković; Orhan Kaynak | 7 |
| 1992–93 | 1.Lig | 1. | 20 | 14 | 6 | 0 | 56 | 16 | 48 | 5R | | Bünyamin Kubat | 17 |
| 1993–94 | Süper Lig | 5. | 30 | 15 | 5 | 10 | 53 | 47 | 50 | SF | | Ertuğrul Sağlam | 17 |
| 1994–95 | Süper Lig | 8. | 34 | 12 | 9 | 13 | 54 | 60 | 45 | SF | | Serkan Aykut | 19 |
| 1995–96 | Süper Lig | 8. | 34 | 12 | 7 | 15 | 46 | 46 | 43 | SF | | Serkan Aykut | 14 |
| 1996–97 | Süper Lig | 9. | 34 | 12 | 9 | 13 | 49 | 52 | 45 | QF | GS | Serkan Aykut | 18 |
| 1997–98 | Süper Lig | 5. | 34 | 14 | 7 | 13 | 42 | 42 | 49 | 5R | SF | Serkan Aykut | 18 |
| 1998–99 | Süper Lig | 10. | 34 | 11 | 8 | 15 | 38 | 53 | 41 | 6R | | Serkan Aykut | 11 |
| 1999–2000 | Süper Lig | 7. | 34 | 16 | 4 | 14 | 51 | 43 | 52 | 6R | | Serkan Aykut | 30 |
| 2000–01 | Süper Lig | 8. | 34 | 13 | 9 | 12 | 55 | 52 | 48 | 3R | | İlhan Mansız | 12 |
| 2001–02 | Süper Lig | 15. | 34 | 10 | 8 | 16 | 32 | 43 | 38 | 6R | | Mehmet Yılmaz | 10 |
| 2002–03 | Süper Lig | 12. | 34 | 10 | 9 | 15 | 42 | 59 | 39 | 6R | | Serkan Aykut | 12 |
| 2003–04 | Süper Lig | 7. | 34 | 13 | 7 | 14 | 46 | 47 | 46 | 6R | | Serkan Aykut | 20 |
| 2004–05 | Süper Lig | 12. | 34 | 10 | 8 | 16 | 40 | 55 | 38 | 63 | | Kaies Ghodhbane | 10 |
| 2005–06 | Süper Lig | 17. | 34 | 9 | 9 | 16 | 45 | 62 | 36 | QF | | Serkan Aykut | 9 |
| 2006–07 | 1.Lig | 10. | 34 | 11 | 10 | 13 | 31 | 38 | 43 | 2R | | Gökhan Kaba | 8 |
| 2007–08 | 1.Lig | 15. | 34 | 10 | 8 | 16 | 45 | 61 | 38 | 1R | | Caner Altın | 10 |
| 2008–09 | 1.Lig | 15. | 34 | 11 | 6 | 17 | 35 | 47 | 39 | 2R | | Burhan Coşkun | 11 |
| 2009–10 | 1.Lig | 10. | 34 | 12 | 6 | 16 | 49 | 47 | 42 | PO | | Turgut Doğan Şahin | 15 |
| 2010–11 | 1.Lig | 2. | 32 | 16 | 10 | 6 | 45 | 20 | 58 | PO | | Simon Zenke | 16 |
| 2011–12 | Süper Lig | 16. | 34 | 9 | 9 | 16 | 36 | 47 | 36 | 4R | | Ekigho Ehiosun | 9 |
| 2012–13 | 1.Lig | 14. | 34 | 7 | 18 | 9 | 38 | 39 | 39 | 2R | | Abdulkadir Özgen | 9 |
| 2013–14 | 1.Lig | 5. | 36 | 17 | 14 | 15 | 61 | 36 | 65 | 2R | | Eldin Adilović | 16 |
| 2014–15 | 1.Lig | 6. | 34 | 15 | 13 | 6 | 48 | 30 | 55 | GS | | Mbilla Etame | 15 |
| 2015–16 | 1.Lig | 9. | 34 | 13 | 8 | 13 | 45 | 39 | 44 | 2R | | Famoussa Koné | 11 |
| 2016–17 | 1.Lig | 15. | 34 | 9 | 9 | 16 | 27 | 46 | 36 | PR | | Famoussa Koné | 6 |
| 2017–18 | 1.Lig | 16. | 34 | 7 | 15 | 12 | 32 | 46 | 36 | 3R | | Göksu Türkdoğan | 7 |
| 2018–19 | 2.Lig | 3. | 34 | 22 | 7 | 5 | 60 | 25 | 73 | 3R | | Bahattin Köse | 14 |
| 2019–20 | 2.Lig | 1. | 28 | 23 | 4 | 1 | 64 | 11 | 73 | 5R | | Bahattin Köse | 19 |
| 2020–21 | 1.Lig | 3. | 34 | 20 | 10 | 4 | 58 | 30 | 70 | 3R | | Nadir Çiftçi | 8 |
| 2021–22 | 1.Lig | 7. | 36 | 13 | 12 | 11 | 54 | 46 | 51 | 5R | | Yasin Öztekin | 12 |
| 2022–23 | 1.Lig | 1. | 36 | 23 | 9 | 4 | 70 | 26 | 78 | 5R | | Douglas Tanque | 17 |
| 2023–24 | Süper Lig | 13. | 38 | 11 | 10 | 17 | 42 | 52 | 43 | R16 | | Marius Mouandilmadji | 10 |
| 2024–25 | Süper Lig | 3. | 36 | 19 | 7 | 10 | 55 | 41 | 64 | 4R | | Marius Mouandilmadji | 10 |
