= Miroslav Šugar =

Croatian footballer

Personal information
- Full name: Miroslav Šugar
- Date of birth: 29 September 1957 (age 69)
- Place of birth: Novi Sad, PR Serbia, FPR Yugoslavia
- Positions: Defender; defensive midfielder

Senior career*
| Years | Team | Apps | (Gls) |
| 1975–1982 | Rijeka | 101 | (0) |
| 1982–1986 | Red Star Belgrade | 70 | (1) |
| 1986–1987 | Šibenik | 13 | (1) |
| 1987–1988 | Thor Waterschei | 21 | (3) |
| 1988–1989 | Racing Genk | 2 | (0) |
- * Club domestic league appearances and goals

Miroslav Šugar (born 29 September 1957) is a Croatian retired football defender.

== Career ==
He also played as defensive midfielder. Born in Novi Sad, SR Serbia, during his career he played with NK Rijeka and Red Star Belgrade in the Yugoslav First League, and later, with HNK Šibenik in Yugoslav Second League, and Waterschei. A season later this club was merged with Winterslag to form Racing Genk, with Šugar thus playing with Genk in the Belgian First Division.

== Career statistics ==
| Club performance | | | League | | Cup | | Continental | | Total | |
| Season | Club | League | Apps | Goals | Apps | Goals | Apps | Goals | Apps | Goals |
| Yugoslavia | | | League | | Yugoslav Cup | | Europe | | Total | |
|---|---|---|---|---|---|---|---|---|---|---|
| 1975-76 | NK Rijeka | Yugoslav First League | 3 | 0 | 0 | 0 | – | | 3 | 0 |
| 1976-77 | NK Rijeka | Yugoslav First League | 16 | 0 | 0 | 0 | – | | 16 | 0 |
| 1977-78 | NK Rijeka | Yugoslav First League | 4 | 0 | 1 | 0 | – | | 5 | 1 |
| 1978-79 | NK Rijeka | Yugoslav First League | 4 | 0 | 0 | 0 | 0 | 0 | 4 | 0 |
| 1979-80 | NK Rijeka | Yugoslav First League | 17 | 0 | 0 | 0 | 2 | 0 | 19 | 0 |
| 1980-81 | NK Rijeka | Yugoslav First League | 26 | 0 | 1 | 0 | – | | 27 | 0 |
| 1981-82 | NK Rijeka | Yugoslav First League | 31 | 0 | 2 | 0 | – | | 33 | 0 |
| 1982-83 | Red Star Belgrade | Yugoslav First League | 16 | 0 | – | | 2 | 0 | 18 | 0 |
| 1983-84 | Red Star Belgrade | Yugoslav First League | 22 | 0 | – | | 2 | 0 | 24 | 0 |
| 1984-85 | Red Star Belgrade | Yugoslav First League | 22 | 1 | – | | 1 | 0 | 23 | 1 |
| 1985-86 | Red Star Belgrade | Yugoslav First League | 10 | 0 | – | | 5 | 1 | 15 | 1 |
| 1986-87 | NK Šibenik | Yugoslav Second League (West) | 13 | 1 | – | | – | | 13 | 1 |
| Belgium | | | League | | Belgian Cup | | Europe | | Total | |
| 1987-88 | Waterschei Thor | Belgian Second Division | 21 | 3 | – | | – | | 21 | 3 |
| 1988-89 | KRC Genk | Belgian First Division | 2 | 0 | – | | – | | 2 | 0 |
| Country | Yugoslavia | | 184 | 2 | 4 | 0 | 12 | 1 | 200 | 5 |
| Country | Belgium | | 23 | 3 | 0 | 0 | 0 | 0 | 23 | 3 |
| Country | Total | | 207 | 5 | 4 | 0 | 12 | 1 | 223 | 6 |

== Honours ==
NK Rijeka

- Yugoslav Cup (2): 1977-78, 1978-79
- Balkans Cup (1): 1978

Red Star Belgrade

- Yugoslav First League (1): 1983-84
- Yugoslav Cup (1): 1984-85
