= Miloš Šestić =

Yugoslav and Serbian footballer

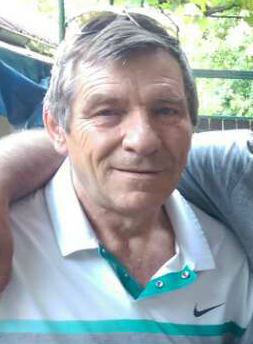
- Šestić in 2017

Personal information
- Full name: Miloš Šestić
- Date of birth: 8 August 1956 (age 70)
- Place of birth: Laktaši, PR Bosnia and Herzegovina, FPR Yugoslavia
- Height: 1.68 m (5 ft 6 in)
- Position: Forward

Youth career
- Jedinstvo Stara Pazova

Senior career*
Years	Team	Apps	(Gls)
1974–1984	Red Star Belgrade	216	(44)
1984–1986	Olympiacos	50	(11)
1987–1989	Vojvodina	74	(14)
1990	Zemun	18	(3)
1991	OFK Beograd	10	(2)
Total		368	(74)

International career
1977–1978	Yugoslavia U21	4	(1)
1979–1980	Yugoslavia Olympic	7	(2)
1979–1985	Yugoslavia	21	(2)
Medal record
Gold medal – first place	UEFA Under-21 Championship	1978
Gold medal – first place	Mediterranean Games	1979
- * Club domestic league appearances and goals

Miloš Šestić (Serbian Cyrillic: Милош Шестић; born 8 August 1956) is a former Yugoslav and Serbian professional footballer who played as a forward.

== Early life ==
Born in Milosavci, a village near the Bosnian city of Laktaši, he grew up in Stara Pazova, a town in Serbia, making his first football steps at the local club Jedinstvo.

== Club career ==
After joining the youth system of Red Star Belgrade, Šestić made his senior debut in late April 1974 (away against Olimpija Ljubljana and at home versus Čelik Zenica). He spent the following 10 years at the club, winning four Yugoslav First League titles (1977, 1980, 1981, and 1984) and one Yugoslav Cup (1982). In the winter of 1985, Šestić moved abroad to Greek club Olympiacos, spending the next two years in Athens. He subsequently returned to his homeland and joined Vojvodina. After helping them win the Yugoslav Second League in 1987, Šestić eventually won the national championship with Vojvodina in the 1988–89 season.

== International career ==
At international level, Šestić was a member of the Yugoslavia national team at one European Championship (1984) and one World Cup (1982). He also represented his country at one Olympic Games (1980) and one Mediterranean Games (1979), winning the gold medal at the latter tournament.

Šestić was critical of his team's role at the UEFA Euro 1984, commenting:

We were very happy when Radanović scored in Split but maybe it would have been better had we not even went to France. We played below any possible standard. Denmark beat us by a score of 5-0 and they could have scored even more. We really had some tough days at that time. I remember that there were many misunderstandings with coach Veselinović. The only thing that should be remembered (from that tournament) is the excellent role of young Stojković who showed his huge amount of potential. All in all, we looked like a traveling circus that arrived without any goal or wish.

Šestić earned a total of 21 caps, scoring 2 goals and his final international was an April 1985 World Cup qualification match against then reigning European champions France.

== Statistics ==
=== Club ===
Club	Season	League	
Club	Season	Apps	Goals
Red Star Belgrade	1973–74	3	0
Red Star Belgrade	1974–75	8	0
Red Star Belgrade	1975–76	6	0
Red Star Belgrade	1976–77	22	8
Red Star Belgrade	1977–78	15	2
Red Star Belgrade	1978–79	28	3
Red Star Belgrade	1979–80	28	4
Red Star Belgrade	1980–81	31	7
Red Star Belgrade	1981–82	27	7
Red Star Belgrade	1982–83	6	0
Red Star Belgrade	1983–84	29	7
Red Star Belgrade	1984–85	13	6
Red Star Belgrade	Total	216	44
Olympiacos	1984–85	17	2
Olympiacos	1985–86	27	8
Olympiacos	1986–87	6	1
Olympiacos	Total	50	11
Vojvodina	1986–87	14	5
Vojvodina	1987–88	24	2
Vojvodina	1988–89	30	7
Vojvodina	1989–90	6	0
Vojvodina	Total	74	14
Zemun	1989–90	13	2
Zemun	1990–91	5	1
Zemun	Total	18	3
OFK Beograd	1990–91	10	2
Career total		368	74

=== International ===
National team	Year	Apps	Goals
Yugoslavia	1979	3	0
Yugoslavia	1980	3	0
Yugoslavia	1981	2	0
Yugoslavia	1982	2	0
Yugoslavia	1983	2	0
Yugoslavia	1984	7	2
Yugoslavia	1985	2	0
Total		21	2

=== International goals ===
Scores and results list Yugoslavia's goal tally first.

No.	Date	Venue	Opponent	Score	Result	Competition
1	19 June 1984	Stade Geoffroy-Guichard, Saint-Étienne, France	France	1–0	2–3	UEFA Euro 1984
2	20 October 1984	Zentralstadion, Leipzig, East Germany	East Germany	3–2	3–2	1986 FIFA World Cup qualification

== Honours ==
=== Club ===
Red Star Belgrade

- Yugoslav First League: 1976–77, 1979–80, 1980–81, 1983–84
- Yugoslav Cup: 1981–82
- UEFA Cup: Runner-up 1978–79

Vojvodina

- Yugoslav First League: 1988–89
- Yugoslav Second League: 1986–87

Zemun

- Yugoslav Second League: 1989–90

=== International ===
Yugoslavia

- UEFA Under-21 Championship: 1978
- Mediterranean Games: 1979
