= Dragoljub Kostić =

Serbian football manager and player

Personal information
- Date of birth: 15 May 1950 (age 76)
- Place of birth: Pristina, PR Serbia, FPR Yugoslavia
- Position: Striker

Youth career
- Priština

Senior career*
| Years | Team | Apps | (Gls) |
| 1970–1976 | Priština | 88 | (32) |
| 1976–1982 | Napredak Kruševac | 136 | (49) |
| 1982–1986 | Jedinstvo Paraćin | | |
| Total | | 224 | (81) |

Managerial career
- 1994: Napredak Kruševac
- * Club domestic league appearances and goals

Dragoljub Kostić (Serbian Cyrillic: Драгољуб Костић; born 15 May 1950) is a Serbian former football manager and player.

== Playing career ==
Kostić started out at his hometown club Priština, competing in the Yugoslav Second League. He was transferred to newly promoted Yugoslav First League side Napredak Kruševac in 1976. With 17 goals in the 1979–80 season, Kostić was the Yugoslav First League joint top scorer, alongside Safet Sušić, leading his team to a highest-ever fourth-place finish and a spot in European competitions for the first time in club history. He subsequently traveled to France and played for Paris Saint-Germain at the 1980 Tournoi de Paris, before returning to Kruševac. In the final years of his playing career, Kostić spent multiple seasons with Jedinstvo Paraćin, playing in the lower leagues.

== Managerial career ==
After hanging up his boots, Kostić briefly served as manager of Napredak Kruševac on two occasions.

== Career statistics ==
| Club | Season | League | |
| Club | Season | Apps | Goals |
|---|---|---|---|
| Priština | 1970–71 | | |
| Priština | 1971–72 | 31 | 7 |
| Priština | 1972–73 | 33 | 13 |
| Priština | 1973–74 | | |
| Priština | 1974–75 | | |
| Priština | 1975–76 | 24 | 12 |
| Priština | Total | 88 | 32 |
| Napredak Kruševac | 1976–77 | 25 | 5 |
| Napredak Kruševac | 1977–78 | 16 | 6 |
| Napredak Kruševac | 1978–79 | 19 | 5 |
| Napredak Kruševac | 1979–80 | 34 | 17 |
| Napredak Kruševac | 1980–81 | 31 | 15 |
| Napredak Kruševac | 1981–82 | 11 | 1 |
| Napredak Kruševac | Total | 136 | 49 |
| Career total | | 224 | 81 |

== Honours ==
Napredak Kruševac

- Yugoslav Second League: 1977–78 (Group East)

Individual

- Yugoslav First League top scorer: 1979–80
