= Jovica Nikolić =

Serbian footballer and manager

Personal information
- Date of birth: 11 July 1959 (age 67)
- Place of birth: Svetozarevo, FPR Yugoslavia
- Height: 1.87 m (6 ft 1 1/2 in)
- Position: Midfielder

Senior career*
Years	Team	Apps	(Gls)
1980–1983	Jagodina		
1983–1989	Red Star Belgrade	86	(12)
1989–1993	Salgueiros	121	(17)
1993–1995	Maia	49	(3)
Total		227	(25)

International career
1985	Yugoslavia	1	(0)

Managerial career
- 2008: Ordabasy
- 2011-2012: Jedinstvo BP
Medal record
Men's Football
Representing Yugoslavia
Olympic Games
Bronze medal – third place	1984 Los Angeles	Team
- * Club domestic league appearances and goals

Jovica Nikolić (Serbian Cyrillic: Јовица Николић; born 11 July 1959) is a Serbian retired footballer who played as a central midfielder, and a manager.

== Club career ==
Nikolić was born in Svetozarevo, Socialist Federal Republic of Yugoslavia. In his country, he played for FK Jagodina and Red Star Belgrade; he won two leagues and one cup with the latter, scoring a career-best eight goals in 22 games in his first season en route to the national championship, but being rarely used in his last two years combined (only 14 league appearances).

In the summer of 1989, aged 30, Nikolić was allowed to leave the country and signed for S.C. Salgueiros in Portugal, helping the club promote to the Primeira Liga in his first season. In the following campaign the Paranhos side overachieved for a final fifth place, with the subsequent qualification to the UEFA Cup – a first-ever– with the player netting six goals in 36 matches; during most of his spell there, he shared teams with countrymen Čedomir Đoinčević and Stevan Milovac.

Nikolić retired from football at 36 years of age, after two seasons with F.C. Maia in the Portuguese third division. In late May 2008 he had his first coaching experience, being appointed at FC Ordabasy in Kazakhstan.

== International career ==
Nikolić won one cap for Yugoslavia, starting in a 1–2 home loss against East Germany for the 1986 FIFA World Cup qualifiers, on 28 September 1985 (match played in Belgrade).

Previously, in 1984, he played Olympic football, appearing in five games out of six and scoring three goals as the national team finished third in Los Angeles.

== Honours ==
=== Club ===
Red Star

- Yugoslav First League: 1983–84, 1987–88
- Yugoslav Cup: 1984–85

Salgueiros

- Segunda Liga: 1989–90

=== Country ===
Yugoslavia

- Summer Olympic Games: Bronze medal 1984
