= Zlatko Krmpotić =

Serbian footballer and manager

Personal information
- Full name: Zlatko Krmpotić
- Date of birth: 7 August 1958 (age 68)
- Place of birth: Belgrade, PR Serbia, FPR Yugoslavia
- Height: 1.79 m (5 ft 10 1/2 in)
- Position: Defender

Youth career
- Red Star Belgrade

Senior career*
| Years | Team | Apps | (Gls) |
| 1977–1986 | Red Star Belgrade | 180 | (7) |
| 1986–1988 | Gençlerbirliği | 60 | (3) |
- AIK Bačka Topola
| Total | | 240 | (10) |

International career
| 1978 | Yugoslavia U21 | 5 | (0) |
| 1980–1982 | Yugoslavia | 8 | (0) |

Managerial career
- AIK Bačka Topola
- 1994–1996: Degerfors IF
- 1997–1998: Sloga Jugomagnat
- 1999: Ankaragücü
- 1999–2000: OFK Beograd
- 2000: Obilić
- 2001: Paniliakos
- 2001: Nea Salamis
- 2002: Kairat
- 2005: Serbia and Montenegro U17
- 2005–2006: Kazma
- 2007–2008: Serbia U19
- 2013: OFK Beograd
- 2014: OFK Beograd
- 2015: TP Mazembe (assistant)
- 2016: Don Bosco
- 2017: ZESCO United
- 2018: Jwaneng Galaxy
- 2019: APR FC
- 2019: Polokwane City
- 2022: USM Alger
Medal record
| Gold medal – first place | UEFA Under-21 Championship | 1978 |
- * Club domestic league appearances and goals

Zlatko Krmpotić (Serbian Cyrillic: Златко Крмпотић; born 7 August 1958) is a Serbian former football player and manager.

== Club career ==
Between 1977 and 1986, Krmpotić spent nine seasons with Red Star Belgrade, making over 200 appearances in all competitions and winning five major trophies. He then moved abroad to Turkey and spent two seasons with Gençlerbirliği (1986–1988). Before retiring from the game, Krmpotić played for AIK Bačka Topola in his homeland.

== International career ==
At international level, Krmpotić represented Yugoslavia at the 1982 FIFA World Cup, making two appearances in the process, as the team finished third in Group 5. He previously won the UEFA European Under-21 Championship in 1978. He earned a total of 8 senior caps (no goals) and his final international was an October 1982 European Championship qualification match away against Norway.

== Managerial career ==
During his managerial career, Krmpotić worked at numerous clubs in 12 countries, namely Serbia and its predecessors (AIK Bačka Topola, OFK Beograd in three spells, and Obilić), Sweden (Degerfors IF), FYR Macedonia (Sloga Jugomagnat), Turkey (Ankaragücü), Greece (Paniliakos), Cyprus (Nea Salamis), Kazakhstan (Kairat), Kuwait (Kazma), DR Congo (Don Bosco), Zambia (ZESCO United), Botswana (Jwaneng Galaxy), and South Africa (Royal Eagles). He also led the Serbia and Montenegro U17s (2005), as well as the Serbia U19s (2007–2008). On February 9, 2022, he signed a contract with USM Alger. On April 17, 2022, he was sacked from USM Alger.

== Personal life ==
Krmpotić is an ethnic Serbian Croat and holds Croatian citizenship. He is the brother-in-law of Serbian media magnate Željko Mitrović.

== Honours ==
=== Club ===
Red Star Belgrade

- Yugoslav First League: 1979–80, 1980–81, 1983–84
- Yugoslav Cup: 1981–82, 1984–85

=== International ===
Yugoslavia

- UEFA Under-21 Championship: 1978
