= Branko Davidović =

Serbian footballer

Personal information
- Date of birth: 3 September 1959 (age 67)
- Place of birth: Sremska Mitrovica, PR Serbia, FPR Yugoslavia
- Position: Goalkeeper

Senior career*
Years	Team	Apps	(Gls)
1980–1981	Maribor	16	(0)
1981–1985	Osijek	62	(0)
1985–1989	Red Star Belgrade	34	(0)
1989–1990	Veracruz	7	(0)
Total		119	(0)
- * Club domestic league appearances and goals

Branko Davidović (Serbian Cyrillic: Бранко Давидовић, born 3 September 1959) is a Serbian retired football player.

== Club career ==
Born in Sremska Mitrovica, SR Serbia, Branko Davidović played for Yugoslav First League teams such as NK Maribor and NK Osijek before joining Red Star Belgrade.

Veracruz sporting director Bora Milutinović signed Davidović days before the start of the 1989–90 Mexican Primera División season. He made only seven appearances for the club.

== External sources ==
- stats
