= Jasmin Džeko =

Bosnian footballer

Personal information
- Date of birth: 15 November 1958 (age 67)
- Place of birth: Doboj, FPR Yugoslavia
- Position: Defender

Senior career*
Years	Team	Apps	(Gls)
1980–1984	NK Osijek	90	(14)
1984–1985	Dinamo Zagreb	27	(2)
1985–1989	NK Osijek	92	(15)
1989–1992	SV Spittal	31	(9)
- FK Sloga Doboj

International career
1983	Yugoslavia	2	(1)

Managerial career
- 1998–1999: FC Kärnten
- 2006: Magdalener SC
- 2009: SV Sachsenburg
- 2009–2012: FC Hermagor
- 2013–2014: SV Maria Gail
- 2014-: SV Raika Greifenburg
- 2017–2018: SC Mühldorf
- 2018–: LAZ Villach
- * Club domestic league appearances and goals

Jasmin Džeko (born 15 November 1958) is a Bosnian retired footballer who played as a defender for SFR Yugoslavia.

== Playing career ==
=== International ===
He made his debut for Yugoslavia in a March 1983 friendly match away against Romania and has earned a total of 2 caps, scoring 1 goal. His second and final international was an April 1983 friendly against France.

== Managerial career ==
Džeko has been managing clubs in the Austrian lower leagues.
