= Boško Gjurovski =

Macedonian footballer and manager

Boško Djurovski
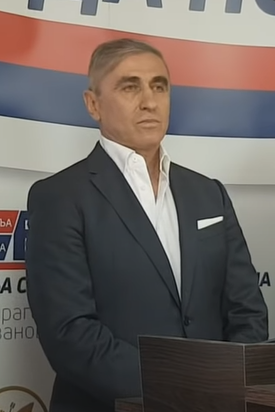

Personal information
- Full name: Boško Djurovski
- Date of birth: 28 December 1961 (age 64)
- Place of birth: Tetovo, PR Macedonia, FPR Yugoslavia
- Height: 1.78 m (5 ft 10 in)
- Positions: Defensive midfielder; sweeper

Youth career
- Teteks
- 1976–1978: Red Star Belgrade

Senior career*
Years	Team	Apps	(Gls)
1978–1989	Red Star Belgrade	503	(103)
1989–1995	Servette	163	(9)
Total		666	(112)

International career
1982–1989	Yugoslavia	4	(0)
1994–1995	Macedonia	7	(3)

Managerial career
- 1998–2001: Servette (assistant)
- 1999: Servette
- 2001–2002: Red Star Belgrade (assistant)
- 2002: Radnički Obrenovac
- 2002–2003: Rad
- 2004: Srem
- 2005: Glogonj / PSK Pančevo
- 2005–2006: Radnički Niš
- 2006–2007: Red Star Belgrade (assistant)
- 2007: Red Star Belgrade
- 2008–2013: Nagoya Grampus (assistant)
- 2013–2015: Macedonia
- 2016–2017: Nagoya Grampus
- 2017: Red Star Belgrade (caretaker)
- 2018–2019: Kyoto Sanga FC
- 2021: Grafičar Beograd
- 2022: Paradou AC
- * Club domestic league appearances and goals

Boško Gjurovski (Macedonian: Бошко Ѓуровски; Serbian: Бошко Ђуровски / Boško Đurovski; born 28 December 1961) is a Macedonian professional football manager and former player who played as a midfielder.

He is the elder brother of Milko Djurovski and the uncle of Mario Djurovski.

== Playing career ==
=== Club ===
He was a long-time servant of Red Star Belgrade, where he played for eleven years. He was very much loved by Red Star fans, especially after his brother, Milko, joined bitter rivals FK Partizan. He was known for excellent defending skills, great tackling and powerful shooting. In 1989, he joined Swiss side Servette FC, where he stayed for six seasons and ended his career.

=== International ===
He made his senior debut for Yugoslavia in a December 1982 European Championship qualification match against Wales and earned a total of 4 caps, scoring no goals. In 1994, just like his brother Milko, Djurovski accepted a call-up to represent the country of his birth. He made his senior debut for Macedonia in a March 1994 friendly match against Slovenia in Skopje and earned a total of 7 caps, scoring all of his 3 international goals in a match against Cyprus. His final international was a June 1995 European Championship qualification match against Belgium.

== Managerial career ==
Gjurovski commenced his coaching career at his former club Servette FC as an assistant, and remained in that position for several seasons, in which they won a Swiss title and finished up runner up in another 2. He left this role to take up another assistant's role at his other former club Red Star Belgrade after this, and also remained in that role for one season.

In November 2002, he became the new coach of FK Rad, after steering FK Radnički Obrenovac to promotion the season earlier. He left FK Rad after only 1 season, citing differences between the club board & himself.

Gjurovski was appointed as Red Star Belgrade head coach in March 2007 after Dušan Bajević walked out on the club. Đurovski did well and won the league title in his first season as senior coach 2006–07 season. However, the following 2007-08 started poorly from the get-go as the team struggled & just managed to qualify for the Champions League 2nd qualifying round with a lot of difficulties, beating Levadia in Belgrade 1:0 and losing in Tallinn 1:2. Gjurovski was sacked after that game. He remained in the Red Star organization, however, moving to the position of the club's chief scout.

Just months after his sacking as head coach of Red Star Belgrade, Gjurovski was targeted for the assistant's role at J1 League underachiever Nagoya Grampus. It was rumored after this that Gjurovski was ultimately sacked by then red star President Dragan Stojković due to the fact that he would be taking the senior coaching position at Nagoya & was determined to take Gjurovski with him as his number 2.

After a 2-year rebuild, Stojković & Gjurovski managed to steer Nagoya to a long-awaited 2nd J-League championship.

On 26 November 2013 Gjurovski was appointed as a head coach of the North Macedonia national football team, but was sacked due to poor results on 7 April 2015.

On 7 May 2017, Gjurovski became the internal coach of Red Star Belgrade, after the departure of Miodrag Božović after a Red Star loss against Voždovac, losing the first place to Partizan.

On 20 March 2022, Gjurovski signed a contract with Paradou AC.

=== Managerial statistics ===
Team	From	To	Record				
Team	From	To	G	W	D	L	Win %
Macedonia	November 2013	April 2015	12	2	3	7	16.67
Nagoya Grampus	August 2016	December 2016	8	3	2	3	37.50
Red Star Belgrade	8 May 2017	27 May 2017	5	3	0	2	60.00
Kyoto Sanga FC	May 2018	December 2018	29	10	4	15	34.48
Total			54	18	9	27	33.33

== Honours ==
=== Player ===
Red Star Belgrade

- Yugoslav First League: 1979–80, 1980–81, 1983–84, 1987–88
- Yugoslav Cup: 1981–82, 1984–85

Servette

- Swiss Super League: 1993–94

=== Manager ===
Radnički Obrenovac

- Second League of FR Yugoslavia: 2001–02

Red Star Belgrade

- Serbian SuperLiga: 2006–07
- Serbian Cup: 2006–07

== Politics ==
In 2020, he decided to join politics claiming that he wants to fight for agrarian rights, natural environment, and the development of sport in Serbia. He received thirteenth position on a combined electoral list of the right-wing Healthy Serbia, and Better Serbia in the 2020 Serbian parliamentary election.

Gjurovski, who was present at the famous football match between Hajduk Split and Red Star Belgrade when Josip Broz Tito died, has expressed yugo-nostalgic sentiments, saying that "life was nice in the time of Broz."

== Personal life ==
Gjurovski was born in Tetovo in 1961, while his father Cvetko Gjurovski (born as Cvetko Stojanović), an ethnic Serb from Belgrade and moved to Macedonia at the beginning of World War II. His paternal grandfather fought for the Royal Serbian Army in World War I and retreated with the Serbian Army to Corfu. According to Gjurovski, his father's original surname Stojanović was changed to Gjurovski after the establishment of the new communist regime in Macedonia and Yugoslavia.
