= Marko Elsner =

Slovenian footballer (1960–2020)

Personal information
- Date of birth: 11 April 1960
- Place of birth: Ljubljana, PR Slovenia, FPR Yugoslavia
- Date of death: 18 May 2020 (aged 60)
- Place of death: Ljubljana, Slovenia
- Height: 1.75 m (5 ft 9 in)
- Position: Defender

Youth career
- Wacker Innsbruck
- Slovan

Senior career*
Years	Team	Apps	(Gls)
1977–1983	Olimpija	109	(12)
1983–1987	Red Star Belgrade	128	(3)
1987–1990	Nice	105	(6)
1990–1991	Admira Wacker	17	(0)
1991–1993	Nice	24	(0)
Total		383	(21)

International career
- Yugoslavia U21
1984–1988	Yugoslavia	14	(0)
1992–1993	Slovenia	2	(0)
Medal record
Men's Football
Representing Yugoslavia
Olympic Games
Bronze medal – third place	1984 Los Angeles	Team
- * Club domestic league appearances and goals

Marko Elsner (11 April 1960 – 18 May 2020) was a Slovenian professional footballer who played as a defender.

== Club career ==
Born in Ljubljana, capital of SR Slovenia (then part of Yugoslavia), Elsner played for Wacker Innsbruck's youth team before returning to Ljubljana where he played with Slovan before joining Olimpija in 1977. In 1983 he was signed by Red Star Belgrade, where he stayed for four seasons. In this period he became a national team player as he was part of the Yugoslav team at the 1984 Olympics, and has won one Yugoslav championship and one Yugoslav Cup during his spell with Red Star.

In 1987, he left Belgrade and moved abroad by signing with French Ligue 1 side OGC Nice. He played with Nice until 1993, except in 1990–91, when he played for the Austrian Bundesliga side Admira Wacker.

== International career ==
Elsner made his debut for Yugoslavia in a March 1984 friendly match against Hungary, and played a total of 14 games for the team between 1984 and 1988. After Slovenia's independence in 1991, he switched his national team allegiance and made his debut for the Slovenia national team against Cyprus in November 1992. His last match was against Estonia on 7 April 1993, and the two games were his only two appearances for Slovenia.

== Personal life ==
Elsner's father, Branko Elsner, was also a footballer and later a coach. His sons Luka and Rok are also former professional footballers.

Elsner died on 18 May 2020 at the age of 60 due to illness.

== Honours ==
Red Star Belgrade

- Yugoslav First League: 1983–84
- Yugoslav Cup: 1985

Yugoslavia national team

- Olympic Games: 1984 (bronze)
