= Milan Janković (footballer, born 1959) =

Serbian footballer

Personal information
- Full name: Milan Janković
- Date of birth: 31 December 1959 (age 66)
- Place of birth: Belgrade, PR Serbia, FPR Yugoslavia
- Height: 1.86 m (6 ft 1 in)
- Position: Midfielder

Youth career
- Žarkovo
- Red Star Belgrade

Senior career*
Years	Team	Apps	(Gls)
1978–1980	Maribor	45	(9)
1980–1987	Red Star Belgrade	151	(20)
1987–1988	Real Madrid	38	(4)
1988–1990	Anderlecht	36	(6)
Total		270	(39)

International career
1986–1989	Yugoslavia	12	(1)

Managerial career
- 2003–2005: Tonga
- * Club domestic league appearances and goals

Milan Janković (Serbian Cyrillic: Милан Јанковић; born 31 December 1959) is a Serbian retired footballer who played as a midfielder.

== Club career ==
Born in Belgrade, Socialist Republic of Serbia, Socialist Federal Republic of Yugoslavia, Janković played youth football with Red Star Belgrade, signing in 1978 with NK Maribor alongside Vladislav Bogićević and Rade Radić in exchange for the best Slovenian player at the time, Milan Arnejčič. Two years later, however, he returned to his previous club, going on to be an important member as the capital side won two leagues and as many cups; he also missed the entire 1982–83 season due to injury.

In late January 1987, aged 27, Janković was allowed to leave his country, joining La Liga powerhouse Real Madrid and being a starter in most of his first full campaign, teaming up in midfield with Rafael Gordillo, Míchel and Rafael Martín Vázquez in support of strikers Emilio Butragueño and Hugo Sánchez, as the Merengues won the league with 95 goals scored.

Janković closed out his career in 1990 at the age of 30, after two seasons with Anderlecht in Belgium.

== International career ==
Janković won 12 caps for Yugoslavia in three years, but did not attend any major international tournament. He scored on his debut, a 2–4 friendly loss with Brazil on 30 April 1986. His final international was a November 1989 friendly match away against Brazil.

== Post-playing career ==
In 1991, the year after ending his playing career, Janković emigrated to Australia, settling in North Queensland with his Croatian-born wife.

In the 2000s, Janković coached the Tonga national team.

== Honours ==
Red Star Belgrade

- Yugoslav First League: 1980–81, 1983–84
- Yugoslav Cup: 1981–82, 1984–85

Real Madrid

- La Liga: 1986–87, 1987–88

Anderlecht

- Belgian Cup: 1988–89
- European Cup Winners' Cup runners-up: 1989–90
- Bruges Matins: 1988
