= Golubovac (Trstenik) =

- Village
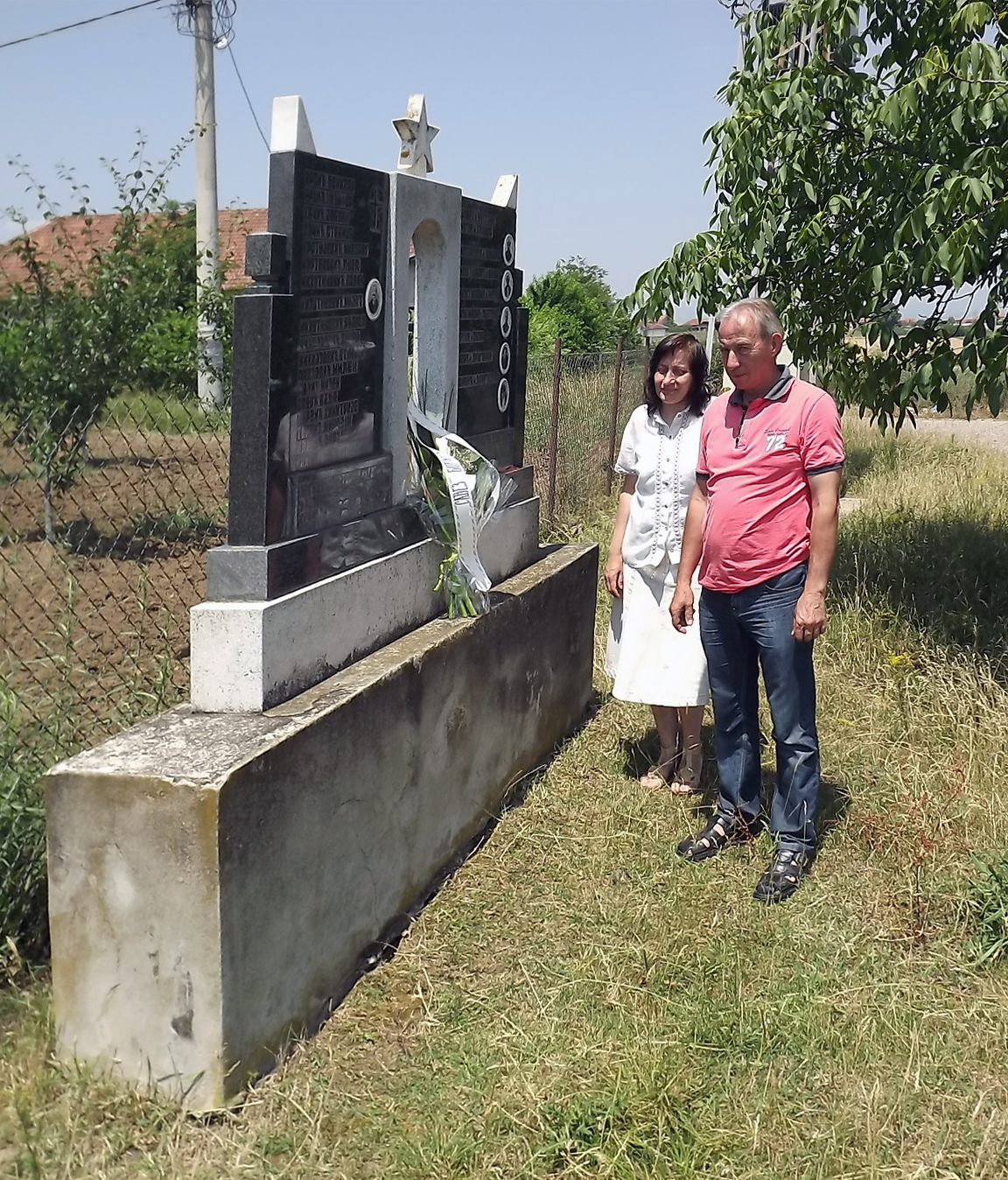
- Monument to fighters in the liberation wars, Golubovac.

- Location within Serbia
- Coordinates: 43°31′19″N 21°07′52″E
- Country: Serbia
- District: Rasina District
- Municipality: Trstenik

Population (2002)
  - Total: 289
- Time zone: UTC+1 (CET)
  - Summer (DST): UTC+2 (CEST)

Golubovac is a village in the municipality of Trstenik, Serbia. According to the 2002 census, the village has a population of 289 people.
