= Ranko Stojić =

Serbian footballer and agent

Personal information
- Full name: Ranko Stojić
- Date of birth: 18 January 1959 (age 67)
- Place of birth: Bugojno, PR Bosnia and Herzegovina, FPR Yugoslavia
- Height: 1.84 m (6 ft 0 in)
- Position: Goalkeeper

Youth career
- Iskra Bugojno

Senior career*
Years	Team	Apps	(Gls)
1976–1978	Iskra Bugojno	7	(0)
1978–1980	Zvezdara		
1980–1984	Partizan	92	(0)
1984–1987	Dinamo Zagreb	69	(0)
1987–1989	RFC Liège	67	(0)
1989–1990	Anderlecht	0	(0)
1990–1992	Charleroi	57	(0)
1992–1994	Sérésien	62	(0)
1994–1995	Charleroi	15	(0)
1995–1997	Royal Antwerp	19	(0)
Total		388	(0)

International career
1984–1986	Yugoslavia	14	(0)
- * Club domestic league appearances and goals

Ranko Stojić (Serbian Cyrillic: Ранко Стојић; born 18 January 1959) is a Serbian former professional footballer who played as a goalkeeper. He earned 14 caps for Yugoslavia in the mid 1980s. Following his playing career, Stojić started working as a players' agent.

== Club career ==
Stojić started out at his hometown side Iskra Bugojno in the Yugoslav Second League. He made his senior debuts in the 1976–77 season. In 1978, Stojić moved to Belgrade and joined lower league club Zvezdara. He was transferred to Yugoslav First League side Partizan in the summer of 1980. Over the next four seasons at the Stadion JNA, Stojić made over 100 competitive appearances for the Crno-beli, helping them win the national championship in 1983. He switched to Dinamo Zagreb the following summer, staying with the Modri for the next three years.

In the summer of 1987, Stojić moved abroad and joined Belgian club RFC Liégeois. He played in the country over the following 10 years and also represented Anderlecht, Charleroi (two spells), RFC Sérésien and Royal Antwerp, before retiring from the game.

== International career ==
Stojić made his international debut for Yugoslavia in a friendly away at Scotland on 12 September 1984, under newly appointed manager Miloš Milutinović, as the team was still reeling from the disastrous showing at UEFA Euro 1984 earlier that summer. In addition to Stojić, six other players got their debuts that day in Glasgow; starters Edin Bahtić, Fadilj Vokri, Petar Georgijevski and Zoran Batrović, as well as subs Davor Jozić and Darko Pančev. At halftime, Stojić was brought on for Dragan Pantelić with Yugoslavia trailing 1–3. He conceded three more goals as the match ended in an embarrassing 1–6 loss for Yugoslavia. Still, Stojić left a good enough impression in Scotland to get a start two weeks later for the opening World Cup 1986 qualifier at home versus Bulgaria. The game ended in a goalless draw.

== Post-playing career ==
In 1997, Stojić established Dynamic Agency, a sports management and consulting company, through which he handled his football agent activities. Some of his clients included French international footballers Louis Saha, Jean-Alain Boumsong, Olivier Kapo, and Djibril Cissé. The agent was further responsible for the transfers of numerous Serbian league footballers abroad, including Nenad Tomović, Filip Đorđević and Nemanja Pejčinović, among others.

In addition to his agent business, during the early 2000s, Stojić became the main financier of the Serbian club Rad. He remained in the role for over a decade, before leaving the position in 2013. Afterwards, during two separate stints, Stojić performed the sporting director role at the Slovenian club Olimpija Ljubljana, both times under the presidential reign of Milan Mandarić.

== Honours ==
Partizan

- Yugoslav First League: 1982–83

Anderlecht

- European Cup Winners' Cup: 1989–90 (runner-up)
