= Živan Ljukovčan =

Yugoslav and Serbian footballer

Personal information
- Date of birth: 24 July 1954 (age 72)
- Place of birth: Krčedin, FPR Yugoslavia
- Position: Goalkeeper

Youth career
- Fruškogorac Krčedin

Senior career*
Years	Team	Apps	(Gls)
1975–1977	Novi Sad	63	(0)
1977–1981	Red Star Belgrade	42	(0)
1982	Timok	10	(0)
1982–1983	Pelister	29	(0)
1983–1984	Budućnost Titograd	34	(1)
1984–1986	Red Star Belgrade	56	(0)
1986–1988	Fenerbahçe	57	(0)
1988–1990	OFK Beograd	25	(0)
Total		316	(1)

International career
1985–1986	Yugoslavia	4	(0)
- * Club domestic league appearances and goals

Živan Ljukovčan (Serbian Cyrillic: Живан Љуковчан; born 24 July 1954) is a former Yugoslav and Serbian footballer who played as a goalkeeper.

== Club career ==
Born in Krčedin, Ljukovčan started out with Novi Sad in the Yugoslav Second League, before transferring to Yugoslav First League club Red Star Belgrade in 1977. He later also played for Timok, Pelister, and Budućnost Titograd. In 1986, Ljukovčan went abroad to Turkey and spent two years with Fenerbahçe. He subsequently returned to Yugoslavia and played two seasons for OFK Beograd, before retiring from the game.

== International career ==
Ljukovčan was capped four times for Yugoslavia between 1985 and 1986, his final a one being a friendly match away against Belgium.

== Honours ==
Red Star Belgrade

- Yugoslav First League: 1979–80, 1980–81
- Yugoslav Cup: 1984–85
