= Milan Jovin =

Serbian footballer (born 1955)

Mile Jovin
Personal information
- Full name: Milan Jovin
- Date of birth: 12 December 1955 (age 70)
- Place of birth: Srpska Crnja, FPR Yugoslavia
- Position: Defender

Youth career
- 1973–1974: Vojvodina

Senior career*
Years	Team	Apps	(Gls)
1974–1978	Novi Sad	70	(0)
1978–1986	Red Star Belgrade	134	(5)
1986–1987	Degerfors	3	(0)
Total		207	(5)

International career
1980–1982	Yugoslavia	4	(0)

Managerial career
- Srem
- 2002–2004: Leotar
- 2005: Radnički Niš
- Radnik Bijeljina
- Novi Pazar
- Red Star Belgrade (youth)
- * Club domestic league appearances and goals

Milan "Mile" Jovin (Serbian Cyrillic: Милан Јовин; born 13 December 1955) is a Serbian retired football manager and player.

As a player, he won four caps for Yugoslavia. He spent eight years playing for Red Star Belgrade.

As a manager, he won the Bosnian Premier League with Leotar in the 2002–03 season.

== Honours ==
=== Player ===
Red Star Belgrade

- Yugoslav First League: 1979–80, 1980–81, 1983–84
- Yugoslav Cup: 1981–82, 1984–85

=== Manager ===
Leotar

- Bosnian Premier League: 2002–03
- Bosnian Cup runner-up: 2002–03
