= Duško Milinković =

Serbian footballer

Personal information
- Full name: Dušan Milinković
- Date of birth: 2 December 1960 (age 65)
- Place of birth: Čačak, PR Serbia, FPR Yugoslavia
- Height: 1.83 m (6 ft 0 in)
- Position: Forward

Senior career*
Years	Team	Apps	(Gls)
1983–1986	Borac Čačak	84	(13)
1987–1988	Rad	43	(16)
1988–1989	Osasuna	18	(1)
1989–1992	Samsunspor	60	(22)
1992–1993	Karşıyaka	17	(2)
1993–1995	Sloga Kraljevo		
1995–1996	Borac Čačak	6	(0)

International career
1988	Yugoslavia Olympic	1	(0)
- * Club domestic league appearances and goals

Dušan "Duško" Milinković (Serbian Cyrillic: Душан Душко Милинковић; born 2 December 1960) is a Serbian retired footballer who played as a forward.

== Club career ==
After starting out at Borac Čačak, Milinković joined Rad, becoming the Yugoslav First League top scorer in the 1987–88 season with 16 goals. He also played professionally in Spain and Turkey.

== International career ==
At international level, Milinković represented Yugoslavia at the 1988 Summer Olympics, making one appearance in the tournament.

== Personal life ==
Nicknamed "Sulja", Milinković is the father of fellow footballer Marko Milinković.

== Honours ==
Individual

- Yugoslav First League top scorer: 1987–88
