= Dragić Komadina =

Yugoslav footballer

Personal information
- Date of birth: 7 May 1962 (age 64)
- Place of birth: Zemun, SFR Yugoslavia
- Positions: Midfielder; defender

Senior career*
Years	Team	Apps	(Gls)
1982–1984	Red Star Belgrade	17	(0)
1984–1985	Olimpija Ljubljana	11	(3)
1985–1987	Sutjeska Nikšić	20	(1)
1987–1989	Red Star Belgrade	18	(1)
1990–1991	OFK Beograd	5	(0)
- * Club domestic league appearances and goals

Dragić Komadina (born 7 May 1962 in Zemun) is a Yugoslav retired football player.

== Club career ==
Dragić Komadina played for several Yugoslav First League teams, most notably Red Star Belgrade.

== External sources ==
- stats
- list of players in 1987/88 season
