= Žarko Đurović =

Serbian football manager and player

Personal information
- Date of birth: 1 August 1961 (age 65)
- Place of birth: Belgrade, PR Serbia, FPR Yugoslavia
- Position: Midfielder

Senior career*
Years	Team	Apps	(Gls)
1976–1977	Čukarički	2	(0)
1981–1984	Red Star Belgrade	32	(4)
1984–1985	Sutjeska Nikšić	32	(5)
1985–1989	Red Star Belgrade	114	(14)
1989–1990	Bellinzona	34	(3)
Total		214	(26)

Managerial career
- 2005: Radnički Obrenovac
- 2007: Smederevo (assistant)
- 2008: Mladenovac
- 2009: Borac Čačak
- 2009–2010: MFK Košice (assistant)
- 2010: MFK Košice
- 2010–2012: Red Star Belgrade (assistant)
- 2012: Mladenovac
- 2013: Mladenovac
- 2013: Radnik Surdulica
- 2015–2018: Guangzhou R&F (assistant)
- * Club domestic league appearances and goals

Žarko Đurović (Serbian Cyrillic: Жарко Ђуровић; born 1 August 1961) is a Serbian football manager and former player.

== Playing career ==
Đurović spent most of his playing career at Red Star Belgrade, winning two Yugoslav First League titles (1984 and 1988). He also played abroad for Swiss club Bellinzona, before retiring from the game.

== Managerial career ==
In December 2010, Đurović was named as assistant manager to Robert Prosinečki at Red Star Belgrade. He left the position in June 2012. In 2013, Đurović briefly served as manager of Radnik Surdulica.

== Honours ==
Red Star Belgrade

- Yugoslav First League: 1983–84, 1987–88
- Yugoslav Cup: 1981–82
