= Zdravko Borovnica =

Serbian footballer

Personal information
- Full name: Zdravko Borovnica
- Date of birth: 17 August 1954 (age 72)
- Place of birth: Nakovo, FPR Yugoslavia
- Positions: Striker; defender

Youth career
- Polet Nakovo

Senior career*
Years	Team	Apps	(Gls)
1975–1976	Proleter Zrenjanin	14	(8)
1976–1982	Red Star Belgrade	124	(18)
1977	→ Footscray JUST (loan)	2	(2)
1982–1983	Bastia	38	(2)
1983–1984	Olimpija Ljubljana	16	(3)
1984–1987	Dinamo Vinkovci	71	(1)
1987–1988	Sutjeska Nikšić	16	(2)
1988–1989	Adanaspor	20	(2)
- * Club domestic league appearances and goals

Zdravko Borovnica (Serbian Cyrillic: Здравко Боровница; born 17 August 1954) is a Serbian former professional footballer who played as a striker or defender.

== Career ==
Born in Nakovo, Borovnica began his career at FK Polet Nakovo alongside his brother Slavko before transferring to FK Proleter Zrenjanin. He subsequently joined Red Star Belgrade, where he initially served as a reserve forward. Following a notable performance in a UEFA Cup match against Dinamo Berlin, in which he scored two goals to secure a 4-1 victory and aggregate turnaround, he established a regular role within the squad. Due to a surplus of forwards and a defensive shortage, he was converted into a defender, noted for his tactical efficiency, aerial ability, and ball-carrying capabilities. He made 161 official appearances and scored 24 goals for the club prior to his departure in 1982.

Next he decided to go abroad, again, he had a brief spell in Australian Footscray JUST in 1977, this time to France Ligue 1 team SC Bastia where he played the 1982–83 season. Afterward, he returned to Yugoslavia where he represented a number of First League clubs, namely, Olimpija Ljubljana (1983–84), Dinamo Vinkovci (1984–87) and Sutjeska Nikšić (1987–88).
