= Zoran Dimitrijević (footballer, born 1963) =

Serbian footballer

Personal information
- Full name: Zoran Dimitrijević; Зоран Димитријевић
- Date of birth: 29 August 1963 (age 63)
- Place of birth: Ivangrad, SFR Yugoslavia
- Position: Defender

Senior career*
Years	Team	Apps	(Gls)
1982–1987	Red Star Belgrade	38	(2)
1987–1988	Radnički Niš	16	(0)
1988–1989	Red Star Belgrade	3	(0)
1990	OFK Beograd	17	(1)
1990–1991	Mogren	11	(0)
Total		85	(3)
- * Club domestic league appearances and goals

Zoran Dimitrijević (Serbian Cyrillic: Зоран Димитријевић; born 29 August 1963) was a Serbian professional footballer.
