= Miodrag Krivokapić (footballer) =

Montenegrin footballer

Miodrag Krivokapic
Personal information
- Full name: Miodrag Krivokapić
- Date of birth: 6 September 1959 (age 67)
- Place of birth: Nikšić, FPR Yugoslavia
- Height: 1.84 m (6 ft 0 in)
- Position: Defender

Senior career*
Years	Team	Apps	(Gls)
1979–1983	Sutjeska	80	(2)
1983–1988	Red Star Belgrade	97	(1)
1988–1993	Dundee United	82	(1)
1993–1996	Motherwell	71	(1)
1996–1997	Raith Rovers	11	(0)
1997–1999	Hamilton Academical	3	(0)

International career
1987–1988	Yugoslavia	5	(0)
1990	Scottish League XI	1	(0)

Managerial career
- 2001: Motherwell (caretaker)
- * Club domestic league appearances and goals

Miodrag Krivokapić (Montenegrin: Миодраг Кривокапић; born 6 September 1959) is a Montenegrin retired footballer who played in defence. He played for Red Star Belgrade and represented Yugoslavia before moving to Scotland in 1988, where he went on to play for a number of clubs, including Dundee United and Motherwell.

== Playing career ==
=== Club ===
Krivokapić joined Dundee United in 1989 for £200,000 from Red Star, where he had previously won four international caps. He stayed with United until 1993, picking up a Scottish Cup runners-up medal in 1991, before spending three years at Motherwell. Krivokapic had spells with Raith Rovers and Hamilton Academical before retiring.

=== International ===
He made his debut for Yugoslavia in a December 1987 European Championship qualification match away against Turkey and has earned a total of 5 caps, scoring no goals. His final international was a September 1988 friendly match against Spain.

== Managerial career ==
He was also reserve team coach at Hamilton winning the Scottish Reserve League in 1997–98. He had a four-game spell as caretaker manager of Motherwell alongside John Philliben in 2001 but was released from the coaching staff when new manager Eric Black was appointed.

In June 2008, Krivokapić returned to Scotland when he was appointed by Celtic to work on youth development.

== Personal life ==
Krivokapić has two sons, Balša and Matija. Balsa played for East Stirlingshire and Matija played for Scottish junior outfit Newmains United.

== Honours ==
Red Star

- Yugoslav First League: 1983–84, 1987–88
- Yugoslav Cup: 1984–85
