= Zlatko Krdžević =

Serbian footballer

Personal information
- Full name: Zlatko Krdžević
- Date of birth: 3 December 1959 (age 66)
- Place of birth: Nova Varoš, SFR Yugoslavia
- Position: Defender

Senior career*
Years	Team	Apps	(Gls)
1980–1984	Sloboda Titovo Užice	76	(4)
1984–1989	Red Star Belgrade	69	(2)
1989–1990	Bellinzona	9	(0)
- * Club domestic league appearances and goals

Zlatko Krdžević (Serbian Cyrillic: Златко Крџевић; born 3 December 1959) is a Serbian retired footballer who played during the 1980s.

Born in Nova Varoš, SR Serbia, he played with Sloboda Titovo Užice and Red Star Belgrade in the Yugoslav First League, and with Bellinzona in Switzerland.

== Career ==
He played mostly as a defender, and sometimes as a midfielder. He played for Sloboda Titovo Užice, where he played 76 league matches from 1980 to 1984, scoring four goals. He played for Red Star Belgrade for five seasons, from 1984 to 1989.

He played 110 official matches and scored three goals. He won the championship title in 1988 and the national cup in 1985. He scored three goals in official matches, all at Red Star Stadium. He scored twice in the championship, against Sutjeska (4–1) in the 1984–85 season, and Željezničar from Sarajevo (4–1) in the 1985–86 championship, as well as in the quarter-finals of the 1987–88 Yugoslav Cup against Radnički Niš in a convincing 6–0 victory.

He made ten appearances in European cups. He played in matches against Benfica (0–2, 3–2) in the 1984–85 European Cup, Panathinaikos (3–0, 1–2) and Rosenborg (3–0, 4–1), in the most elite football competition in Europe in the 1986–87 season, as well as against Botev from Plovdiv (3–0, 2–2) and Brugge (3–1, 0–4) in the 1987–88 UEFA Cup.

He played abroad for the Swiss club Bellinzona in the 1989–90 season.
