= Vasil Ringov =

Macedonian footballer (1955–2025)

Personal information
- Date of birth: 17 April 1955
- Place of birth: Strumica, PR Macedonia, FPR Yugoslavia
- Date of death: 23 December 2025 (aged 70)
- Position: Midfielder

Senior career*
Years	Team	Apps	(Gls)
1973–1975	Partizan	2	(0)
1975–1977	Teteks	45	(16)
1977–1983	Vardar	154	(69)
1983–1984	Dinamo Zagreb	12	(3)
1983–1986	Vardar	56	(23)
1985–1986	Eintracht Braunschweig	4	(0)
1986–1987	Vardar	4	(1)
Total		277	(112)
- * Club domestic league appearances and goals

Vasil Ringov (Macedonian: Bacил Pингoв; 17 April 1955 – 23 December 2025) was a Yugoslav and Macedonian footballer who played as a midfielder.

== Career ==
Born in Strumica (SR Macedonia, SFR Yugoslavia), he is considered to be one of the best Macedonian footballers ever, along with Golden Shoe winner, Darko Pančev. He started playing while still a teenager for FK Belasica, after that he moved to Belgrade giants FK Partizan, but after not getting many chances there, he moved to Second League side FK Teteks where he would become the club's main star. It was two years later that he caught the attention of another Macedonian club in the Second League, Skopje's FK Vardar. After another two seasons, and with Ringov's help, Vardar returned to the Yugoslav First League where they would play during most of the 1980s. He became the main player at the club, having played until 1986 more than 200 league matches and scoring 93 league goals for them. It was in Skopje that Ringov played most of his career, being the exceptions a short half season spell in another top-league club Dinamo Zagreb, and near the end of his playing career, another half season spell, this time in 2. Bundesliga club Eintracht Braunschweig.

== Death ==
Ringov died on 23 December 2025 at the age of 70.
