= Goran Milojević =

Serbian footballer and manager

Personal information
- Date of birth: 6 December 1964 (age 61)
- Place of birth: Aranđelovac, SFR Yugoslavia
- Height: 1.77 m (5 ft 10 in)
- Position: Attacking midfielder

Senior career*
Years	Team	Apps	(Gls)
1982–1988	Red Star Belgrade	98	(8)
1988–1990	Partizan	59	(15)
1990–1991	Brest	24	(3)
1991–1992	CP Mérida	18	(15)
1992–1995	Mallorca	128	(66)
1995–1996	Celta	25	(6)
1996–1997	CP Mérida	7	(1)
1997	Club América	10	(3)
1998	Villarreal	4	(0)
Total		373	(117)

International career
1988–1989	Yugoslavia	2	(0)

Managerial career
- 2001: Železnik
- 2002–2003: Rudar Pljevlja
- 2003–2004: Radnički Obrenovac
- 2007: Smederevo
- 2008–2009: Mérida UD
- 2010: Košice
- 2010: Atlético Baleares
- 2010–2011: Ružomberok
- 2012: BSK Borča
- 2013–2014: Mladost Podgorica
- 2017: Ermis Aradippou
- 2018–2019: Mornar
- 2019–2020: Philippines
- 2020: Bačka
- 2021: Inđija
- * Club domestic league appearances and goals

Goran Milojević (Serbian Cyrillic: Горан Милојевић; born 6 December 1964) is a Serbian football manager and former player.

== Club career ==
Born in Aranđelovac, SR Serbia, SFR Yugoslavia, Milojević played as an attacking midfielder for both major clubs in his country, Belgrade's Red Star and FK Partizan, winning the 1988–89 Yugoslav Cup with the latter and scoring in the final against Velež Mostar, a 6–1 win.

After one season with Brest where he was relegated from the Ligue 1, Milojević moved to Spain where he would spend the better part of his remaining career. He started out at CP Mérida, then moved after a couple of months to La Liga team Mallorca, immediately making an impact although his nine goals (a squad-best) in five months were not enough to prevent relegation, as last.

Milojević then registered an impressive average of 19 goals per campaign in the second division, although Mallorca never promoted in those three years. He returned to the top flight in 1995 with Celta de Vigo, then re-joined former side Mérida in the second level, appearing rarely as they promoted to division one for the second time in their history.

After splitting 1997–98 with two teams, one of them Mexico's Club América, Milojević called it quits at nearly 34. In the beginning of the following decade he took up coaching, managing FK Železnik, Rudar Pljevlja, Radnički Obrenovac also taking charge of Spanish side Mérida UD, who rose from the ashes of his previous club, folded.

In December 2009, Milojević became head coach of MFK Košice of Slovakia.

== International career ==
Whilst at Partizan, Milojević collected two caps for Yugoslavia. He was, however, overlooked for the squad selected for the 1990 FIFA World Cup in Italy.

As a manager, he was appointed as the head coach for the Philippines national team for the 2022 FIFA World Cup qualifiers.

== Personal life ==
His brother Vladan was also a footballer and so was Goran's son Stefan.
