= Slavko Radovanović =

Yugoslav footballer

Personal information
- Full name: Slavko Radovanović
- Date of birth: 24 August 1962 (age 64)
- Place of birth: Zemun, SFR Yugoslavia
- Position: Defender

Senior career*
Years	Team	Apps	(Gls)
1980–1983	Red Star Belgrade	13	(0)
1984–1985	Sutjeska Nikšić	44	(8)
1985–1989	Red Star Belgrade	81	(7)
1989–1991	Avignon Foot 84	65	(5)
1991–1996	Pau		
- * Club domestic league appearances and goals

Slavko Radovanović (Serbian Cyrillic: Славко Радовановић; born 24 August 1962, in Zemun) is a former Yugoslav football player, from the 1980s.

Radovanović was known mostly for playing for Red Star Belgrade and is remembered for scoring both a goal and an own-goal in two matches against Club Brugge in 1987–88 UEFA Cup campaign. He later spent years in France with Avignon Foot 84 and Pau FC.
