= Dragan Miletović =

Serbian footballer

Personal information
- Full name: Dragan Miletović
- Date of birth: 24 November 1956 (age 69)
- Place of birth: Kosovska Mitrovica, FPR Yugoslavia
- Position: Defender

Senior career*
Years	Team	Apps	(Gls)
1974–1978	Trepča	79	(3)
1978–1985	Red Star Belgrade	132	(1)
1986–1987	Västeras SK	47	(2)
1987–1988	Sutjeska Nikšić	2	(0)
Total		260	(6)
- * Club domestic league appearances and goals

Dragan Miletović (Serbian Cyrillic: Драган Милетовић; born 24 November 1956) is a Serbian retired footballer.
