= 1981–82 Yugoslav Cup =

1981–82 Yugoslav Football Cup
34th Marshal Tito Cup

Tournament details
- Country: Yugoslavia
- Dates: 7 October 1981 – 23 May 1982
- Teams: 32

Final positions
- Champions: Red Star (10th title)
- Runners-up: Dinamo Zagreb

Tournament statistics
- Matches played: 32
- Goals scored: 80 (2.5 per match)
- Top goal scorer: Dušan Savić (5)

The 1981–82 Yugoslav Cup was the 34th season of the top football knockout competition in SFR Yugoslavia, the Yugoslav Cup (Serbo-Croatian: Kup Jugoslavije), officially billed as the "Marshal Tito Cup" (Kup Maršala Tita), since its establishment in 1946.

The 1980–81 winners Velež failed to retain the trophy as they were knocked out in the first round by minnows Mogren from Budva. Dinamo Zagreb and the Belgrade-based Red Star, who finished as winners and runners-up in the 1981–82 Yugoslav First League, reached the tournament final. In the two-legged final Red Star won their 10th cup title after beating Dinamo 6–4 on aggregate. This was their first cup win since the 1970–71 edition.

Surprise of the tournament were second-level side Galenika from Zemun, who managed to reach the semi-finals, knocking out the remaining two of the Yugoslav "Big Four" clubs Partizan and Hajduk Split in the process. Fuelled by their prolific goalscorer Slobodan Santrač, Galenika also had a successful league season as they won the 1981–82 Second League Division East and won promotion to the 1982–83 Yugoslav First League.

== Calendar ==
The Yugoslav Cup was a tournament for which clubs from all tiers of the football pyramid were eligible to enter. In addition, amateur teams put together by individual Yugoslav People's Army garrisons and various factories and industrial plants were also encouraged to enter, which meant that each cup edition could have several thousands of teams in its preliminary stages. These teams would play through a number of qualifying rounds before reaching the first round proper, in which they would be paired with top-flight teams.

The cup final was played over two legs on 16 and 23 May, traditionally scheduled to coincide with Youth Day celebrated on 25 May, a national holiday in Yugoslavia which also doubled as the official commemoration of Josip Broz Tito's birthday.

Round	Legs	Date	Fixtures	Clubs
First round (round of 32)	Single	7 October 1981	16	32 → 16
Second round (round of 16)	Single	7 November 1981	8	16 → 8
Quarter-finals	Single	18 November 1981	8	8 → 4
Semi-finals	Single	21 April 1982	4	4 → 2
Final	Double	16 and 23 May 1982	2	2 → 1

== First round ==
First round proper was played on 7 October 1981. Ties were decided over a single leg, with penalty shootouts used to determine winners when matches ended in a draw after regular time. Sixteen out of eighteen 1981–82 Yugoslav First League clubs entered the competition at this stage (everyone except Osijek and Teteks, who were only promoted to top level at the end of the 1980–81 season).

Each of the sixteen top-level clubs were paired with a lower-tier team who made it to this stage through preliminary qualifiers. In addition, Croatia Zürich, a Zurich-based club ran by Croatian emigrants in Switzerland, also received a spot, but exited the tournament following a 5–0 defeat to Budućnost.

Seven top-level clubs were knocked out at this stage: OFK Belgrade, Partizan, Radnički Niš, Vardar, Zagreb and the defending cup winners Velež, who lost their tie to Montenegrin minnows Mogren on penalties.

In the following tables winning teams are marked in bold; teams from outside top level are marked in italic script.

Tie no	Home team	Score	Away team
1	Borac Banja Luka	0–1	**Red Star**
2	**Budućnost**	5–0	Croatia Zürich
3	Dinamo Vinkovci	0–3	**Sloboda**
4	**Sarajevo**	5–0	Proleter
5	Istra	1–3	**Vojvodina**
6	**Maribor**	0–0 (6–5 p)	Vardar
7	**Mogren**	0–0 (12–11 p)	Velež
8	**Napredak Kruševac**	1–1 (7–6 p)	Željezničar
9	**Rijeka**	2–0	Prishtina
10	Zagreb	0–1	**Rad**
11	Novi Sad	1–1 (5–6 p)	**Hajduk Split**
12	Partizan	0–2	**Galenika**
13	**Radnički Kragujevac**	1–1 (6–4 p)	OFK Belgrade
14	Rudar Kakanj	1–1 (2–5 p)	**Olimpija**
15	Segesta	0–4	**Dinamo Zagreb**
16	**Sloga Doboj**	1–1 (5–3 p)	Radnički Niš

== Second round ==
Second round, or round of 16, was played on 7 November 1981. It featured nine top flight and seven lower-level clubs. Galenika and Rad were the only two teams from outside top level who managed to progress, both after winning ties against fellow minnows Maribor and Mogren.

Tie no	Home team	Score	Away team
1	Red Star	2–0	Sarajevo
2	Dinamo Zagreb	2–0	Sloga Doboj
3	Galenika	2–1	Maribor
4	Hajduk Split	3–1	Napredak Kruševac
5	Olimpija	4–0	Rijeka
6	Rad	0–0 (4–2 p)	Mogren
7	Sloboda	1–1 (6–4 p)	Radnički Kragujevac
8	Vojvodina	0–1	Budućnost

== Quarter-finals ==
Quarter-finals were played on 18 November 1981. Red Star, Dinamo Zagreb and Sloboda progressed to the semi-finals, along with Zemun-based Galenika - who were the only team from outside top flight left in the competition after this stage.

Tie no	Home team	Score	Away team
1	Red Star	3–0	Olimpija
2	Galenika	2–1	Hajduk Split
3	Rad	0–2	Dinamo Zagreb
4	Sloboda	0–0 (4–2 p)	Budućnost

== Semi-finals ==
Semi-finals were played on 21 April 1982. Red Star hosted Galenika at their Red Star Stadium in Belgrade and won 4–1 through goals by Milko Đurovski, Vladimir Petrović, Dušan Savić and Miloš Šestić, with Slobodan Santrač scoring a goal for the visiting team. Dinamo Zagreb played Sloboda at Maksimir Stadium and won 2–0 through goals by Snješko Cerin and Zlatko Kranjčar.

Tie no	Home team	Score	Away team
1	Red Star	4–1	Galenika
2	Dinamo Zagreb	2–0	Sloboda

== Final ==
1982 Yugoslav Cup Final
Dinamo Zagreb	Red Star
4	6
- on aggregate

First leg
Dinamo Zagreb	Red Star
2	2
- Date: 16 May 1982
- Venue: Maksimir Stadium, Zagreb
- Referee: Edvard Šoštarič
- Attendance: 50,000

Second leg
Red Star	Dinamo Zagreb
4	2
- Date: 23 May 1982
- Venue: Red Star Stadium, Belgrade
- Referee: Damir Matovinović
- Attendance: 60,000

=== Summary ===
Dinamo Zagreb and Red Star, two of the so-called Yugoslav "Big Four" clubs, had reached the 1982 final. The two clubs also dominated in the Yugoslav First League that season, with Dinamo crowned champions only two weeks before the first leg of the cup final, and Red Star finishing the season as runners-up. Red Star eventually won the final tie 6–4 on aggregate.

For Red Star this was their 15th appearance in the Yugoslav Cup final and their first cup title since 1971. It was won by a squad featuring major club stars such as Vladimir Petrović, Dušan Savić, Miloš Šestić and Milko Đurovski, led by experienced coach Branko Stanković.

For Dinamo Zagreb this was their 11th appearance in the final and a chance to win their 7th cup title. The team, led by Miroslav Blažević, eventually failed to clinch what would have been their first Yugoslav Double, as they had won the 1981–82 Yugoslav First League with five points in front of Red Star. Dinamo's squad that season featured club legends such as Snješko Cerin, Velimir Zajec, Zlatko Kranjčar, Marko Mlinarić and Stjepan Deverić.

Dinamo and Red Star had previously met in the cup final on three occasions, in 1950, 1964 and 1980. Red Star had won the first two finals while Dinamo picked up the 1980 cup. Before the competition would cease to exist amid the breakup of Yugoslavia in the early 1990s the two clubs would also meet for the fifth time in the 1984–85 Yugoslav Cup final.

=== Match details ===
In the first leg, played on 16 May 1982 in front of 50,000 people at Maksimir Stadium in Zagreb, Red Star took an early lead through a goal by Miloš Šestić in the 15th minute. After the half-time break Dinamo equalized through Džemal Mustedanagić in the 49th minute and then went on to take the lead through Snješko Cerin ten minutes later. Six minutes before the final whistle Dinamo's defender Zvjezdan Cvetković tackled Zlatko Krmpotić inside Dinamo's box, and a penalty was awarded to Red Star, which Vladimir Petrović successfully converted to make the final score 2–2.

In the second leg played on 23 May 1982 in Belgrade Red Star coach Branko Stanković named Dušan Savić in the starting eleven. Savić, who had spent the first leg in Zagreb on the substitute bench, used runs down the right side to create several goalscoring opportunities for Rajko Janjanin and Vladimir Petrović very early on, but Dinamo's goalkeeper Tomislav Ivković was on form and saved a couple of close-range efforts. In the 31st minute Savić latched onto a long pass by Milan Janković to make it 1–0. Four minutes before half-time Dinamo pulled back through Zlatko Kranjčar's free kick, and minutes later Marko Mlinarić embarked on a solo run from the centre of the pitch to set up Snješko Cerin for an easy tap-in which made it 2–1 for the Blues. Red Star's Ranko Đorđić equalized through a powerful shot from the edge of the box in the 66th minute, and seven minutes later Miloš Šestić scored a goal after a long pass by Vladimir Petrović which tipped the result in Red Star's favour to make the aggregate score 5–4. Savić added his second goal three minutes before full-time, which set the final score 4–2 on the day and 6–4 on aggregate.

=== First leg ===
16 May 1982
17:00 CET (UTC+01:00)

Dinamo Zagreb	2–2	Red Star
Mustedanagić 49'; Cerin 59'	Report	Šestić 14'; Petrović 85' (pen.)

Maksimir Stadium, Zagreb
Attendance: 50,000
Referee: Edvard Šoštarič (Maribor)

Dinamo Zagreb	Red Star

GK	1	(Socialist Federal Republic of Yugoslavia) Marijan Vlak	(substituted off) 43'
DF	2	(Socialist Federal Republic of Yugoslavia) Petar Bručić
DF	3	(Socialist Federal Republic of Yugoslavia) Zvjezdan Cvetković
DF	4	(Socialist Federal Republic of Yugoslavia) Ismet Hadžić	(substituted off) 35'
DF	5	(Socialist Federal Republic of Yugoslavia) Velimir Zajec
DF	6	(Socialist Federal Republic of Yugoslavia) Dragan Bošnjak
MF	7	(Australia) Eddie Krnčević
FW	8	(Socialist Federal Republic of Yugoslavia) Snješko Cerin
FW	9	(Socialist Federal Republic of Yugoslavia) Zlatko Kranjčar
MF	10	(Socialist Federal Republic of Yugoslavia) Marko Mlinarić
FW	11	(Socialist Federal Republic of Yugoslavia) Stjepan Deverić
Substitutes:
GK	12	(Socialist Federal Republic of Yugoslavia) Tomislav Ivković	(substituted on) 43'
MF	13	(Socialist Federal Republic of Yugoslavia) Džemal Mustedanagić	(substituted on) 35'
MF	14	(Socialist Federal Republic of Yugoslavia) Željko Hohnjec
MF	15	(Socialist Federal Republic of Yugoslavia) Emil Dragičević
MF	16	(Socialist Federal Republic of Yugoslavia) Zoran Panić
Manager:
(Socialist Federal Republic of Yugoslavia) Miroslav Blažević

GK	1	(Socialist Federal Republic of Yugoslavia) Dragan Simeunović	(substituted off) 55'
DF	2	(Socialist Federal Republic of Yugoslavia) Zlatko Krmpotić
DF	3	(Socialist Federal Republic of Yugoslavia) Zoran Mališević
DF	4	(Socialist Federal Republic of Yugoslavia) Boško Đurovski
DF	5	(Socialist Federal Republic of Yugoslavia) Zdravko Borovnica
DF	6	(Socialist Federal Republic of Yugoslavia) Ivan Jurišić	(substituted off) 10'
MF	7	(Socialist Federal Republic of Yugoslavia) Vladimir Petrović
MF	8	(Socialist Federal Republic of Yugoslavia) Miloš Šestić
FW	9	(Socialist Federal Republic of Yugoslavia) Ranko Đorđić
MF	10	(Socialist Federal Republic of Yugoslavia) Milan Janković
FW	11	(Socialist Federal Republic of Yugoslavia) Milko Đurovski
Substitutes:
GK	12	(Socialist Federal Republic of Yugoslavia) Aleksandar Stojanović	(substituted on) 55'
DF	13	(Socialist Federal Republic of Yugoslavia) Ljubiša Rajković	(substituted on) 10'
MF	14	(Socialist Federal Republic of Yugoslavia) Rajko Janjanin
FW	15	(Socialist Federal Republic of Yugoslavia) Nedeljko Milosavljević
MF	16	(Socialist Federal Republic of Yugoslavia) Srebrenko Repčić
Manager:
(Socialist Federal Republic of Yugoslavia) Branko Stanković

=== Second leg ===
23 May 1982
16:30 CET (UTC+01:00)

Red Star	4–2	Dinamo Zagreb
Savić 31', 87'; Đorđić 66'; Šestić 73'	Report	Kranjčar 42'; Cerin 45'

Marakana, Belgrade
Attendance: 60,000
Referee: Damir Matovinović (Rijeka)

Red Star	Dinamo Zagreb

RED STAR:
GK	1	(Socialist Federal Republic of Yugoslavia) Aleksandar Stojanović
DF	2	(Socialist Federal Republic of Yugoslavia) Zlatko Krmpotić
DF	3	(Socialist Federal Republic of Yugoslavia) Zoran Mališević
DF	4	(Socialist Federal Republic of Yugoslavia) Boško Đurovski
DF	5	(Socialist Federal Republic of Yugoslavia) Zdravko Borovnica
DF	6	(Socialist Federal Republic of Yugoslavia) Milan Janković
MF	7	(Socialist Federal Republic of Yugoslavia) Vladimir Petrović (c)
MF	8	(Socialist Federal Republic of Yugoslavia) Miloš Šestić
FW	9	(Socialist Federal Republic of Yugoslavia) Dušan Savić
MF	10	(Socialist Federal Republic of Yugoslavia) Rajko Janjanin	(substituted off) 61'
FW	11	(Socialist Federal Republic of Yugoslavia) Milko Đurovski	(substituted off) 46'
Substitutes:
GK	12	(Socialist Federal Republic of Yugoslavia) Stevan Stojanović
DF	13	(Socialist Federal Republic of Yugoslavia) Milenko Rajković
MF	14	(Socialist Federal Republic of Yugoslavia) Ranko Đorđić	(substituted on) 61'
FW	15	(Socialist Federal Republic of Yugoslavia) Nedeljko Milosavljević
MF	16	(Socialist Federal Republic of Yugoslavia) Srebrenko Repčić	(substituted on) 46'
Manager:
(Socialist Federal Republic of Yugoslavia) Branko Stanković

DINAMO ZAGREB:
GK	1	(Socialist Federal Republic of Yugoslavia) Tomislav Ivković
DF	2	(Socialist Federal Republic of Yugoslavia) Emil Dragičević
DF	3	(Socialist Federal Republic of Yugoslavia) Zvjezdan Cvetković
DF	4	(Socialist Federal Republic of Yugoslavia) Dragan Bošnjak
DF	5	(Socialist Federal Republic of Yugoslavia) Velimir Zajec (c)
DF	6	(Socialist Federal Republic of Yugoslavia) Srećko Bogdan
MF	7	(Australia) Eddie Krnčević
FW	8	(Socialist Federal Republic of Yugoslavia) Snješko Cerin
FW	9	(Socialist Federal Republic of Yugoslavia) Zlatko Kranjčar	(substituted off) 80'
MF	10	(Socialist Federal Republic of Yugoslavia) Marko Mlinarić
FW	11	(Socialist Federal Republic of Yugoslavia) Zoran Panić	(substituted off) 85'
Substitutes:
GK	12	(Socialist Federal Republic of Yugoslavia) Gordan Mohor
DF	13	(Socialist Federal Republic of Yugoslavia) Marin Kurtela
MF	14	(Socialist Federal Republic of Yugoslavia) Željko Hohnjec	(substituted on) 80'
FW	15	(Socialist Federal Republic of Yugoslavia) Drago Dumbović	(substituted on) 85'
FW	16	(Socialist Federal Republic of Yugoslavia) Milan Ćalasan
Manager:
(Socialist Federal Republic of Yugoslavia) Miroslav Blažević

== Top scorers ==
The top goalscorers in the 1981–82 Yugoslav Cup (first round proper and onwards) were as follows:

Rank	Scorer	Club	Goals
1	(Socialist Federal Republic of Yugoslavia) Dušan Savić	Red Star	5
2	(Socialist Federal Republic of Yugoslavia) Vladimir Petrović	Red Star	4
2	(Socialist Federal Republic of Yugoslavia) Slobodan Santrač	Galenika	4
4	(Socialist Federal Republic of Yugoslavia) Predrag Pašić	Sarajevo	3
4	(Socialist Federal Republic of Yugoslavia) Mihajlo Petrović	Olimpija	3
4	(Socialist Federal Republic of Yugoslavia) Ivan Gudelj	Hajduk Split	3
4	(Socialist Federal Republic of Yugoslavia) Stjepan Deverić	Dinamo Zagreb	3
4	(Socialist Federal Republic of Yugoslavia) Snješko Cerin	Dinamo Zagreb	3
4	(Socialist Federal Republic of Yugoslavia) Miloš Šestić	Red Star	3
10	(Socialist Federal Republic of Yugoslavia) Mojaš Radonjić	Budućnost	2
10	(Socialist Federal Republic of Yugoslavia) Zoran Panić	Dinamo Zagreb	2
10	(Socialist Federal Republic of Yugoslavia) Zlatko Kranjčar	Dinamo Zagreb	2
10	(Socialist Federal Republic of Yugoslavia) Ranko Đorđić	Red Star	2

== See also ==
- 1981–82 Yugoslav First League
- 1981–82 Yugoslav Second League
- 1981–82 NK Dinamo Zagreb season
