= 1981–82 NK Dinamo Zagreb season =

Dinamo Zagreb
1981–82 season
- Chairman: Neven Barač
- Manager: Miroslav Blažević
- 1. Federal League: Champions (4th title)
- Marshal Tito Cup: Runners-up
- Top goalscorer: Snješko Cerin (19)
Home colours

The 1981–82 season was the 36th season of competitive football played by Dinamo Zagreb. Dinamo Zagreb ended up first in the Yugoslav First League and had the highest attendance in the league, in total 510,000 visitors at home (average 30,000 per game) and 316,000 in away matches (average 18,000).

== First Federal League ==
=== Matches ===
Date	Opponents	Home/ Away	Result (F – A)	Dinamo scorers
26 Jul 1981	OFK Belgrade	H	0 – 0	
2 Aug 1981	Red Star	A	2 – 2	Panić (2)
9 Aug 1981	Hajduk Split	H	0 – 0	
16 Aug 1981	Sloboda	A	1 – 1	Arnautović
23 Aug 1981	Teteks	H	4 – 0	Cerin (2), B. Cvetković, Hohnjec
30 Aug 1981	Sarajevo	A	3 – 2	Deverić (2), Bručić
13 Sep 1981	Zagreb	H	7 – 0	D. Bošnjak (2), Arnautović (2), Cerin, Panić, Dragičević
20 Sep 1981	Vojvodina	A	1 – 3	D. Bošnjak
23 Sep 1981	Partizan	H	1 – 0	Deverić
27 Sep 1981	Rijeka	A	2 – 2	Deverić, Panić
4 Oct 1981	Osijek	H	1 – 0	Arnautović
11 Oct 1981	Olimpija	A	2 – 2	Cerin (2)
25 Oct 1981	Vardar	H	3 – 2	Cerin (2), Deverić
28 Oct 1981	Željezničar	A	1 – 3	Panić
31 Oct 1981	Radnički Niš	H	2 – 0	Mlinarić, Z. Cvetković
3 Nov 1981	Velež	H	4 – 2	Cerin (3), Bručić
15 Nov 1981	Budućnost	A	0 – 1	
14 Feb 1982	OFK Belgrade	A	0 – 0	
21 Feb 1982	Red Star	H	3 – 0	Kranjčar (2), Cerin
28 Feb 1982	Hajduk Split	A	2 – 1	Zajec, Deverić
7 Mar 1982	Sloboda	H	4 – 0	Cerin, Deverić, Kranjčar, Panić
10 Mar 1982	Teteks	A	4 – 1	Deverić (2), Cerin, Kranjčar
14 Mar 1982	Sarajevo	H	3 – 2	Z. Cvetković (2), Deverić
21 Mar 1982	Zagreb	A	2 – 1	Cerin, Deverić
24 Mar 1982	Vojvodina	H	3 – 0	Cerin (2), Kranjčar
28 Mar 1982	Partizan	A	0 – 0	
31 Mar 1982	Rijeka	H	2 – 0	Kranjčar, Panić
4 Apr 1982	Osijek	A	2 – 1	Kranjčar, Panić
11 Apr 1982	Olimpija	H	2 – 2	Kranjčar (2)
14 Apr 1982	Vardar	A	3 – 0	Cerin (2), Kranjčar
18 Apr 1982	Željezničar	H	2 – 0	Kranjčar (2)
25 Apr 1982	Radnički Niš	A	0 – 3	
28 Apr 1982	Velež	A	0 – 1	
2 May 1982	Budućnost	H	1 – 0	Kranjčar

=== Classification ===
Pos	Team	Pld	W	D	L	GF	GA	GD	Pts	Qualification or relegation
1	Dinamo Zagreb (C)	34	20	9	5	67	32	+35	49	Qualification for European Cup first round
2	Red Star Belgrade	34	17	10	7	68	40	+28	44	Qualification for Cup Winners' Cup first round
3	Hajduk Split	34	17	10	7	53	31	+22	44	Qualification for UEFA Cup first round
4	Sarajevo	34	16	7	11	57	54	+3	39	Qualification for UEFA Cup first round
5	Željezničar	34	16	6	12	52	37	+15	38	

Source: rsssf.org
Rules for classification: 1) points; 2) goal difference; 3) number of goals scored.
(C) Champions

=== Results summary ===
Overall								Home						Away					
Pld	W	D	L	GF	GA	GD	Pts	W	D	L	GF	GA	GD	W	D	L	GF	GA	GD
34	20	9	5	67	32	+35	49	14	3	0	42	8	+34	6	6	5	25	24	+1

N.B. Points awarded for a win: 2

== Marshal Tito Cup ==
Date	Round	Opponents	Home/ Away	Result (F – A)	Dinamo scorers
7 Oct 1981	First round	Segesta	A	4 – 0	Panić (2), Bručić, Deverić
7 Nov 1981	Second round	Sloga Doboj	H	2 – 0	Deverić (2)
18 Nov 1981	Quarter-finals	Rad	A	2 – 0	Mlinarić, E. Dragičević
21 Apr 1982	Semi-finals	Sloboda	H	2 – 0	Cerin, Kranjčar
16 May 1982	Final first leg	Red Star	H	2 – 2	Mustedanagić, Cerin
23 May 1982	Final second leg	Red Star	A	2 – 4	Kranjčar, Cerin

== Player details ==
=== Player statistics ===
Nat.	Player	Position	First League		Yugoslav Cup		Total
Nat.	Player	Position	Apps	Goals	Apps	Goals	Apps	Goals
(Socialist Federal Republic of Yugoslavia)	Zlatan Arnautović	MF	9	4
(Socialist Federal Republic of Yugoslavia)	Radimir Bobinac	MF	2	0
(Socialist Federal Republic of Yugoslavia)	Dragan Bošnjak	MF	30	2
(Socialist Federal Republic of Yugoslavia)	Milivoj Bračun	DF	26	0
(Socialist Federal Republic of Yugoslavia)	Davor Braun	DF	2	0
(Socialist Federal Republic of Yugoslavia)	Petar Bručić	MF	31	2
(Socialist Federal Republic of Yugoslavia)	Milan Ćalasan	FW	4	0
(Socialist Federal Republic of Yugoslavia)	Snješko Cerin	FW	31	19
(Socialist Federal Republic of Yugoslavia)	Borislav Cvetković	FW	9	1
(Socialist Federal Republic of Yugoslavia)	Zvjezdan Cvetković	DF	26	3
(Socialist Federal Republic of Yugoslavia)	Branko Devčić	DF	3	0
(Socialist Federal Republic of Yugoslavia)	Stjepan Deverić	FW	25	11
(Socialist Federal Republic of Yugoslavia)	Emil Dragičević	FW	15	1
(Socialist Federal Republic of Yugoslavia)	Drago Dumbović	FW	6	0
(Socialist Federal Republic of Yugoslavia)	Ismet Hadžić	DF	16	0
(Socialist Federal Republic of Yugoslavia)	Željko Hohnjec	FW	9	1
(Socialist Federal Republic of Yugoslavia)	Čedomir Jovičević	DF	1	0
(Socialist Federal Republic of Yugoslavia)	Zlatko Kranjčar	FW	17	12
(Australia)	Eddie Krnčević	FW	1	0
(Socialist Federal Republic of Yugoslavia)	Marin Kurtela	MF	6	0
(Socialist Federal Republic of Yugoslavia)	Zvonko Marić	GK	3	0
(Socialist Federal Republic of Yugoslavia)	Marko Mlinarić	FW	33	2
(Socialist Federal Republic of Yugoslavia)	Mladen Munjaković	MF	3	0
(Socialist Federal Republic of Yugoslavia)	Džemal Mustedanagić	MF	29	0
(Socialist Federal Republic of Yugoslavia)	Zoran Panić	FW	23	8
(Socialist Federal Republic of Yugoslavia)	Marijan Vlak	GK	32	0
(Socialist Federal Republic of Yugoslavia)	Velimir Zajec	MF	28	1

FW = Forward, MF = Midfielder, GK = Goalkeeper, DF = Defender
