= 1979–80 Yugoslav Cup =

1979–80 Yugoslav Football Cup
32nd Marshal Tito Cup

Tournament details
- Country: Yugoslavia
- Dates: 17 October 1979 – 24 May 1980
- Teams: 32

Final positions
- Champions: Dinamo Zagreb (6th title)
- Runners-up: Red Star
- Semifinalists: Kikinda; Sarajevo
- Cup Winners' Cup: Dinamo Zagreb

Tournament statistics
- Matches played: 32
- Top goal scorer: Zlatko Kranjčar (5)
- Goals scored in penalty shoot-outs not included.

The 1979–80 Yugoslav Cup was the 32nd season of the top football knockout competition in SFR Yugoslavia, the Yugoslav Cup (Serbo-Croatian: Kup Jugoslavije), also known as the "Marshal Tito Cup" (Kup Maršala Tita), since its establishment in 1946.

== Calendar ==
The Yugoslav Cup was a tournament for which clubs from all tiers of the football pyramid were eligible to enter. In addition, amateur teams put together by individual Yugoslav People's Army garrisons and various factories and industrial plants were also encouraged to enter, which meant that each cup edition had thousands of teams in its initial stages. These teams would go through a number of qualifying rounds before reaching the first round proper, in which they would be paired with top-flight teams.

The cup final was scheduled to coincide with Youth Day, a national holiday celebrated on 25 May and accompanied by the Relay of Youth, which doubled as the official commemoration of Josip Broz Tito's birthday.

Round	Dates	Fixtures	Clubs
First round	17 October 1979	16	32 → 16
Second round	29 November 1979	8	16 → 8
Quarter-finals	5 March 1980	8	8 → 4
Semi-finals	9 April 1980	4	4 → 2
Final	14 and 24 May 1980	2	2 → 1

== First round ==
Tie no	Home team	Score	Away team
1	Belišće (III)	1–1 (7–6 p)	Rad (II)
2	Budućnost	2–1	Grobničan (?)
3	Red Star	2–0	Velež
4	Crvenka (III)	0–2	Radnički Kragujevac (II)
5	Dinamo Zagreb	2–1	Galenika Zemun (II)
6	Sarajevo	1–1 (4–2 p)	Rijeka
7	Leotar (II)	0–0 (5–3 p)	Vojvodina
8	Maribor (II)	0–0 (5–4 p)	Olimpija
9	Osijek	2–1	Napredak Kruševac
10	NK Zagreb (II)	3–2	OFK Beograd (II)
11	Kikinda (II)	3–1	Slaven Koprivnica (?)
12	Partizan	2–1	Hajduk Split
13	Prishtina (II)	1–0	Radnički Niš
14	Radnik Bijeljina (III)	0–0 (4–2 p)	Vardar
15	Sloboda Tuzla	3–1	Željezničar
16	Sutjeska (II)	1–1 (4–5 p)	Borac Banja Luka

== Second round ==
Tie no	Home team	Score	Away team
1	Borac Banja Luka	1–2	Partizan
2	Red Star	4–0	Prishtina (II)
3	Leotar (II)	0–0 (6–5 p)	Budućnost
4	Maribor (II)	3–2	Belišće (III)
5	Kikinda (II)	1–0	Osijek
6	Radnički Kragujevac (II)	2–3	Sarajevo
7	Radnik Bijeljina (III)	1–4	Dinamo Zagreb
8	Sloboda Tuzla	2–0	NK Zagreb (II)

== Quarter-finals ==
Tie no	Home team	Score	Away team
1	Sarajevo	3–0	Sloboda Tuzla
2	Maribor (II)	1–2	Red Star
3	Kikinda (II)	1–0	Leotar (II)
4	Partizan	1–1 (6–7 p)	Dinamo Zagreb

== Semi-finals ==
Tie no	Home team	Score	Away team
1	Dinamo Zagreb	3–1	Kikinda (II)
2	Sarajevo	0–0 (1–4 p)	Red Star

== Final ==
=== First leg ===
14 May 1980

Dinamo Zagreb	1–0	Red Star
Kranjčar 49'

Stadion Maksimir, Zagreb
Attendance: 50,000
Referee: Zoran Rebac (Mostar)

Dinamo Zagreb	Red Star

GK	1	(Socialist Federal Republic of Yugoslavia) Tomislav Ivković
DF	2	(Socialist Federal Republic of Yugoslavia) Marin Kurtela
DF	3	(Socialist Federal Republic of Yugoslavia) Branko Tucak
DF	4	(Socialist Federal Republic of Yugoslavia) Ismet Hadžić
MF	5	(Socialist Federal Republic of Yugoslavia) Dragan Bošnjak
DF	6	(Socialist Federal Republic of Yugoslavia) Srećko Bogdan (c)
MF	7	(Socialist Federal Republic of Yugoslavia) Džemal Mustedanagić
MF	8	(Socialist Federal Republic of Yugoslavia) Rajko Janjanin
FW	9	(Socialist Federal Republic of Yugoslavia) Zlatko Kranjčar
MF	10	(Socialist Federal Republic of Yugoslavia) Marko Mlinarić	Substituted off
FW	11	(Socialist Federal Republic of Yugoslavia) Stjepan Deverić	Substituted off
Substitutes:
FW	?	(Socialist Federal Republic of Yugoslavia) Mario Bonić	Substituted on
FW	?	(Socialist Federal Republic of Yugoslavia) Milan Ćalasan	Substituted on
Manager:
(Socialist Federal Republic of Yugoslavia) Vlatko Marković

GK	1	(Socialist Federal Republic of Yugoslavia) Živan Ljukovčan
DF	2	(Socialist Federal Republic of Yugoslavia) Zlatko Krmpotić (c)
DF	3	(Socialist Federal Republic of Yugoslavia) Milan Jovin
MF	4	(Socialist Federal Republic of Yugoslavia) Boško Gjurovski
DF	5	(Socialist Federal Republic of Yugoslavia) Dragan Miletović
MF	6	(Socialist Federal Republic of Yugoslavia) Zdravko Borovnica	(substituted off) ?'
DF	7	(Socialist Federal Republic of Yugoslavia) Dušan Nikolić
MF	8	(Socialist Federal Republic of Yugoslavia) Cvijetin Blagojević
FW	9	(Socialist Federal Republic of Yugoslavia) Dušan Savić
MF	10	(Socialist Federal Republic of Yugoslavia) Miloš Šestić
FW	11	(Socialist Federal Republic of Yugoslavia) Srebrenko Repčić	Substituted off
Substitutes:
FW	?	(Socialist Federal Republic of Yugoslavia) Nedeljko Milosavljević	Substituted on
FW	?	(Socialist Federal Republic of Yugoslavia) Zoran Filipović	Substituted on
Manager:
(Socialist Federal Republic of Yugoslavia) Branko Stanković

=== Second leg ===
24 May 1980

Red Star	1–1	Dinamo Zagreb
Filipović 65'		Dumbović 71'

Marakana, Belgrade
Attendance: 50,128
Referee: Edvard Šoštarič (Maribor)

Red Star	Dinamo Zagreb

GK	1	(Socialist Federal Republic of Yugoslavia) Živan Ljukovčan
DF	2	(Socialist Federal Republic of Yugoslavia) Zlatko Krmpotić (c)
DF	3	(Socialist Federal Republic of Yugoslavia) Milan Jovin
MF	4	(Socialist Federal Republic of Yugoslavia) Dušan Nikolić	Substituted off
DF	5	(Socialist Federal Republic of Yugoslavia) Dragan Miletović
DF	6	(Socialist Federal Republic of Yugoslavia) Ivan Jurišić
MF	7	(Socialist Federal Republic of Yugoslavia) Miloš Šestić
MF	8	(Socialist Federal Republic of Yugoslavia) Cvijetin Blagojević
FW	9	(Socialist Federal Republic of Yugoslavia) Dušan Savić
FW	10	(Socialist Federal Republic of Yugoslavia) Nedeljko Milosavljević
FW	11	(Socialist Federal Republic of Yugoslavia) Srebrenko Repčić	Substituted off
Substitutes:
FW	?	(Socialist Federal Republic of Yugoslavia) Zoran Filipović	Substituted on
MF	?	(Socialist Federal Republic of Yugoslavia) Boško Gjurovski	Substituted on
Manager:
(Socialist Federal Republic of Yugoslavia) Branko Stanković

GK	1	(Socialist Federal Republic of Yugoslavia) Tomislav Ivković
DF	2	(Socialist Federal Republic of Yugoslavia) Marin Kurtela
DF	3	(Socialist Federal Republic of Yugoslavia) Branko Tucak
DF	4	(Socialist Federal Republic of Yugoslavia) Ismet Hadžić
DF	5	(Socialist Federal Republic of Yugoslavia) Srećko Bogdan (c)
MF	6	(Socialist Federal Republic of Yugoslavia) Džemal Mustedanagić
MF	7	(Socialist Federal Republic of Yugoslavia) Petar Bručić
MF	8	(Socialist Federal Republic of Yugoslavia) Dragan Bošnjak
FW	9	(Socialist Federal Republic of Yugoslavia) Zlatko Kranjčar
MF	10	(Socialist Federal Republic of Yugoslavia) Marko Mlinarić
FW	11	(Socialist Federal Republic of Yugoslavia) Stjepan Deverić	Substituted off
Substitutes:
DF	?	(Socialist Federal Republic of Yugoslavia) Drago Dumbović	Substituted on
Manager:
(Socialist Federal Republic of Yugoslavia) Vlatko Marković

== See also ==
- 1979–80 Yugoslav First League
