= 1981–82 Yugoslav First League =

Prva savezna liga
- Season: 1981–82
- Dates: 26 July 1981 – 2 May 1982
- Champions: Dinamo Zagreb (4th title)
- Relegated: Teteks; NK Zagreb
- European Cup: Dinamo Zagreb
- Cup Winners' Cup: Red Star
- UEFA Cup: Hajduk Split; Sarajevo
- Top goalscorer: Snješko Cerin (19)

The 1981–82 Yugoslav First League season was the 36th season of the First Federal League (Serbo-Croatian: Prva savezna liga), the top level association football competition of SFR Yugoslavia, since its establishment in 1946. The season began on 26 July 1981 and ended on 2 May 1982. Dinamo Zagreb led by Miroslav Blažević won their fourth title five points ahead of previous season's champions Red Star.

== Teams ==
A total of 18 teams contested the league, including 16 sides from the 1980–81 season and two clubs promoted from the 1980–81 Yugoslav Second League as winners of the two second level subdivisions East and West. The league was contested in a double round robin format, with each club playing every other club twice, for a total of 34 rounds. Two points were awarded for wins and one point for draws.

Borac Banja Luka and Napredak Kruševac were relegated at the end of the previous season. Osijek and Teteks Tetovo were promoted from the 1980–81 Yugoslav Second League.

Locations of teams' home cities in the 1981–82 Yugoslav First League

Team	City / town	Federal Republic	Position in 1980–81
Budućnost	Titograd	SR Montenegro	6th
Dinamo Zagreb	Zagreb	SR Croatia	5th
Hajduk Split	Split	SR Croatia	2nd
OFK Belgrade	Belgrade	SR Serbia	15th
Olimpija	Ljubljana	SR Slovenia	12th
Osijek	Osijek	SR Croatia	—
Partizan	Belgrade	SR Serbia	8th
Radnički Niš	Niš	SR Serbia	3rd
Red Star	Belgrade	SR Serbia	1st
Rijeka	Rijeka	SR Croatia	7th
Sarajevo	Sarajevo	SR Bosnia and Herzegovina	13th
Sloboda	Tuzla	SR Bosnia and Herzegovina	4th
Teteks	Tetovo	SR Macedonia	—
Vardar	Skopje	SR Macedonia	11th
Velež	Mostar	SR Bosnia and Herzegovina	9th
Vojvodina	Novi Sad	SR Serbia	10th
NK Zagreb	Zagreb	SR Croatia	16th
Željezničar	Sarajevo	SR Bosnia and Herzegovina	14th

== League table ==
Pos	Team	Pld	W	D	L	GF	GA	GD	Pts	Qualification or relegation
1	Dinamo Zagreb (C)	34	20	9	5	67	32	+35	49	Qualification for European Cup first round
2	Red Star Belgrade	34	17	10	7	68	40	+28	44	Qualification for Cup Winners' Cup first round
3	Hajduk Split	34	17	10	7	53	31	+22	44	Qualification for UEFA Cup first round
4	Sarajevo	34	16	7	11	57	54	+3	39	Qualification for UEFA Cup first round
5	Željezničar	34	16	6	12	52	37	+15	38	
6	Partizan	34	14	9	11	40	31	+9	37	
7	Velež	34	13	10	11	49	40	+9	36	
8	Budućnost	34	13	8	13	47	44	+3	34	
9	Olimpija	34	9	15	10	39	38	+1	33	
10	Vojvodina	34	12	8	14	48	48	0	32	
11	Radnički Niš	34	12	8	14	37	44	−7	32	
12	Rijeka	34	11	10	13	39	54	−15	32	
13	Sloboda Tuzla	34	9	13	12	36	44	−8	31	
14	Vardar	34	12	6	16	43	51	−8	30	
15	OFK Belgrade	34	9	12	13	33	41	−8	30	
16	Osijek	34	9	11	14	36	37	−1	29	
17	Teteks (R)	34	8	7	19	31	68	−37	23	Relegation to Yugoslav Second League
18	NK Zagreb (R)	34	7	5	22	27	68	−41	19	Relegation to Yugoslav Second League

Source: rsssf.org
Rules for classification: 1) points; 2) goal difference; 3) number of goals scored.
(C) Champions; (R) Relegated

== Results ==
Home \ Away	BUD	DIN	HAJ	OFK	OLI	OSI	PAR	RNI	RSB	RIJ	SAR	SLO	TET	VAR	VEL	VOJ	ZAG	ŽEL
Budućnost		1–0	0–0	4–2	4–2	3–2	1–3	2–0	1–1	2–2	1–0	2–0	4–2	2–0	2–0	3–1	4–0	0–1
Dinamo Zagreb	1–0		0–0	0–0	2–2	1–0	1–0	2–0	3–0	2–0	3–2	4–0	4–0	3–2	4–2	3–0	7–0	2–0
Hajduk Split	2–1	1–2		1–4	3–1	4–1	3–0	1–0	1–0	2–0	1–4	2–1	7–0	2–0	0–3 (Note: Match awarded 0–3 to Velež.)	0–0	4–0	2–1
OFK Belgrade	1–3	0–0	2–2		0–0	3–2	1–0	0–0	2–2	0–1	1–1	1–0	1–0	0–2	3–1	3–1	4–2	0–0
Olimpija	2–0	2–2	1–1	1–0		0–0	3–1	2–2	0–3	3–0	4–1	0–0	3–0	1–1	1–1	2–1	2–0	3–0
Osijek	0–0	1–2	1–1	0–0	0–0		1–1	2–1	2–0	4–0	1–1	2–0	2–1	5–0	0–0	1–0	2–1	0–0
Partizan	0–0	0–0	2–3	1–0	0–0	1–0		1–0	1–4	1–0	0–0	7–2	4–0	1–0	4–1	2–0	2–0	1–0
Radnički Niš	5–1	3–0	1–0	1–0	1–0	1–0	1–0		2–0	1–0	2–4	1–1	0–0	2–1	1–1	1–1	1–0	2–0
Red Star	1–1	2–2	2–1	4–1	2–2	2–1	1–0	3–0		4–1	5–1	2–2	3–2	4–0	0–0	2–3	3–2	1–2
Rijeka	0–0	2–2	1–1	2–0	0–0	3–1	1–0	5–4	0–0		2–1	0–1	2–2	1–0	3–2	1–1	2–0	3–1
Sarajevo	2–1	2–3	1–0	1–1	1–0	0–0	0–0	3–2	2–1	6–1		1–4	4–1	3–1	4–1	1–0	0–0	2–1
Sloboda Tuzla	3–0	1–1	0–1	2–0	0–0	1–0	3–1	0–0	2–2	2–0	0–1		2–0	1–1	1–1	3–0	1–1	0–4
Teteks	2–1	1–4	1–0	0–1	3–1	1–0	0–0	2–0	0–3	2–1	2–3	1–1		0–0	2–0	1–1	1–0	1–2
Vardar	2–1	0–3	0–1	1–1	2–0	1–2	1–1	2–0	1–2	2–0	3–2	1–0	3–1		1–0	2–1	3–0	3–0
Velež	1–0	1–0	1–1	2–0	3–0	2–0	0–0	2–1	2–4	4–1	4–0	0–0	2–0	0–0		1–0	5–1	1–1
Vojvodina	2–0	3–1	0–0	1–0	2–0	1–1	4–3	4–0	0–2	1–1	4–1	4–1	1–1	4–3	0–3		4–1	2–0
NK Zagreb	1–1	1–2	0–3	1–1	1–0	2–1	0–1	0–2	0–3	1–1	0–1	2–0	2–1	3–2	2–0	2–0		1–2
Željezničar	3–1	3–1	1–2	2–0	1–1	1–0	0–1	4–0	0–0	1–2	4–1	1–1	6–0	4–2	2–0	2–1	2–0	

Source: DataSoccer.it
Legend: Blue = home team win; Yellow = draw; Red = away team win.

== Winning squad ==
Champions: Dinamo Zagreb
Player	League	
Player	Matches	Goals
(Socialist Federal Republic of Yugoslavia) Marko Mlinarić	33	2
(Socialist Federal Republic of Yugoslavia) Marijan Vlak	32	0
(Socialist Federal Republic of Yugoslavia) Snješko Cerin	31	19
(Socialist Federal Republic of Yugoslavia) Petar Bručić	31	2
(Socialist Federal Republic of Yugoslavia) Dragan Bošnjak	30	2
(Socialist Federal Republic of Yugoslavia) Džemal Mustedanagić	29	0
(Socialist Federal Republic of Yugoslavia) Velimir Zajec	28	1
(Socialist Federal Republic of Yugoslavia) Zvjezdan Cvetković	26	3
(Socialist Federal Republic of Yugoslavia) Milivoj Bračun	26	0
(Socialist Federal Republic of Yugoslavia) Stjepan Deverić	25	11
(Socialist Federal Republic of Yugoslavia) Zoran Panić	23	8
(Socialist Federal Republic of Yugoslavia) Zlatko Kranjčar (Note: played only the second part of the season, after coming back from the mandatory army stint at the mid-season winter break)	17	12
(Socialist Federal Republic of Yugoslavia) Ismet Hadžić	16	0
(Socialist Federal Republic of Yugoslavia) Emil Dragičević	15	1
(Socialist Federal Republic of Yugoslavia) Zlatan Arnautović	9	4
(Socialist Federal Republic of Yugoslavia) Borislav Cvetković	9	1
(Socialist Federal Republic of Yugoslavia) Željko Hohnjec	9	1
(Socialist Federal Republic of Yugoslavia) Marin Kurtela	6	0
(Socialist Federal Republic of Yugoslavia) Drago Dumbović	6	0
(Socialist Federal Republic of Yugoslavia) Milan Ćalasan	4	0
(Socialist Federal Republic of Yugoslavia) Zvonko Marić	3	0
(Socialist Federal Republic of Yugoslavia) Branko Devčić	3	0
(Socialist Federal Republic of Yugoslavia) Mladen Munjaković	3	0
(Socialist Federal Republic of Yugoslavia) Radimir Bobinac	2	0
(Socialist Federal Republic of Yugoslavia) Davor Braun	2	0
(Socialist Federal Republic of Yugoslavia) Čedomir Jovičević	1	0
(Australia) Edward Krnčević	1	0
Coach: Miroslav Blažević

== Season statistics ==
- Widest winning margin: 7 goals:
  - Dinamo Zagreb 7–0 NK Zagreb (13 September 1981)
  - Hajduk Split 7–0 Teteks (31 March 1982)
- Most goals in a match: 9 goals:
  - Rijeka 5–4 Radnički Niš (23 August 1981)
  - Partizan 7–2 Sloboda (25 April 1982)

=== Top scorers ===
Rank	Scorer	Club	Goals
1	(Socialist Federal Republic of Yugoslavia) Snješko Cerin	Dinamo Zagreb	19
2	(Socialist Federal Republic of Yugoslavia) Edin Bahtić	Željezničar	17
3	(Socialist Federal Republic of Yugoslavia) Dušan Savić	Red Star	16
3	(Socialist Federal Republic of Yugoslavia) Vasil Ringov	Vardar	16
5	(Socialist Federal Republic of Yugoslavia) Zlatko Vujović	Hajduk Split	14
6	(Socialist Federal Republic of Yugoslavia) Zlatko Kranjčar	Dinamo Zagreb	12
6	(Socialist Federal Republic of Yugoslavia) Predrag Pašić	FK Sarajevo	12
6	(Socialist Federal Republic of Yugoslavia) Vili Ameršek	Olimpija	12
9	(Socialist Federal Republic of Yugoslavia) Safet Sušić	Sarajevo	11
9	(Socialist Federal Republic of Yugoslavia) Dušan Bajević	Velež	11

== See also ==
- 1981–82 Yugoslav Second League
- 1981–82 Yugoslav Cup
- 1981–82 NK Dinamo Zagreb season
