= Dika Stojanović =

Dika Stojanović may refer to:

- Aleksandar Stojanović
- Stevan Stojanović
