= Doline, Kanjiža =

Doline Долине (Serbian) Völgyes (Hungarian)
- Village (Selo)
- Location of Doline within Serbia Doline (Serbia) Doline (Europe)
- Coordinates: 45°57′22″N 19°52′14″E
- Country: Serbia
- Province: Vojvodina
- District: North Banat
- Municipalities: Kanjiža
- Elevation: 103 m (338 ft)

Population (2002)
  - Doline: 516
- Time zone: UTC+1 (CET)
  - Summer (DST): UTC+2 (CEST)
- Area code: +381(0)24
- Car plates: KA

Doline (Serbian Cyrillic: Долине, Hungarian: Völgyes) is a village in Serbia. It is situated in the Kanjiža municipality, in the North Banat District, Vojvodina province. The village has a Hungarian ethnic majority (96.89%) and its population numbering 516 people (2002 census).

Doline means sinkhole, though whether there is a connection is unclear. Karst topography, which was originally named in the Yugoslav-Italian area, includes sinkholes.

== See also ==
- List of places in Serbia
- List of cities, towns and villages in Vojvodina
