= Novo Selo (Kanjiža) =

Novo Selo Ново Село (Serbian) Újfalu (Hungarian)
- Village (Selo)
- Location of Vojvoda Zimonić within Serbia Novo Selo (Serbia) Novo Selo (Europe)
- Coordinates: 45°59′52″N 19°51′37″E
- Country: Serbia
- Province: Vojvodina
- District: North Banat
- Municipalities: Kanjiža

Population (2002)
  - Novo Selo: 211
- Time zone: UTC+1 (CET)
  - Summer (DST): UTC+2 (CEST)
- Area code: +381(0)24
- Car plates: KA

Novo Selo (in Serbian Cyrillic: Ново Село, Hungarian: Újfalu) is a village in Serbia. It is situated in the Kanjiža municipality, in the North Banat District, Vojvodina province. At the 2002 census. the village had a population of 211 with a Hungarian ethnic majority (87.67%). The etymology of the village comes from Slavic languages meaning new village, Novo Selo.

== See also ==
- List of places in Serbia
- List of cities, towns and villages in Vojvodina
