= Zimonić =

Zimonić Зимонић (Serbian) Ilonafalu (Hungarian)
- Village (Selo)
- Location of Vojvoda Zimonić within Serbia Zimonić (Serbia) Zimonić (Europe)
- Coordinates: 46°01′55″N 19°59′56″E
- Country: Serbia
- Province: Vojvodina
- District: North Banat
- Municipalities: Kanjiža
- Elevation: 80 m (260 ft)

Population (2022)
  - Total: 175
- Time zone: UTC+1 (CET)
  - Summer (DST): UTC+2 (CEST)
- Area code: +381(0)24
- Car plates: KA

Zimonić (Serbian Cyrillic: Зимонић, Hungarian: Ilonafalu) is a village in Serbia. It is situated in the Kanjiža municipality, in the North Banat District, Vojvodina province. The village has a Hungarian ethnic majority and its population numbering 175 people according to the 2022 census.

== Name ==
Formerly, the village was known as Vojvoda Zimonić (Војвода Зимонић) or Vojvoda Zimonjić (Војвода Зимоњић).

== Ethnic groups (2002 census) ==
- Hungarians = 185 (54.41%)
- Serbs = 152 (44.71%)
- Germans = 1 (0.29%)
- undeclared = 2 (0.59%)

== Historical population ==
- 1961: 587
- 1971: 529
- 1981: 383
- 1991: 282
- 2002: 340

== See also ==
- List of places in Serbia
- List of cities, towns and villages in Vojvodina
