= Totovo Selo =

Totovo Selo Тотово Село (Serbian) Tóthfalu (Hungarian)
- Village (Selo)
- Location of Vojvoda Zimonić within Serbia Totovo Selo (Serbia) Totovo Selo (Europe)
- Coordinates: 45°57′26″N 19°54′00″E
- Country: Serbia
- Province: Vojvodina
- District: North Backa
- Municipalities: Kanjiža
- Elevation: 106 m (348 ft)

Population (2002)
  - Totovo Selo: 709
- Time zone: UTC+1 (CET)
  - Summer (DST): UTC+2 (CEST)
- Postal code: 24427
- Area code: +381(0)24
- Car plates: KA

Totovo Selo (in Serbian Cyrillic: Тотово Село, in Hungarian: Tóthfalu) is a village in Serbia. It is situated in the Kanjiža municipality, in the North Bačka District, Vojvodina province. The village has a Hungarian ethnic majority (99.43%) and its population numbering 709 people (2002 census).

== See also ==
- List of places in Serbia
- List of cities, towns and villages in Vojvodina
