= Kanjiža =

Kanjiža Кањижа (Serbian) Magyarkanizsa (Hungarian)
- Town and municipality
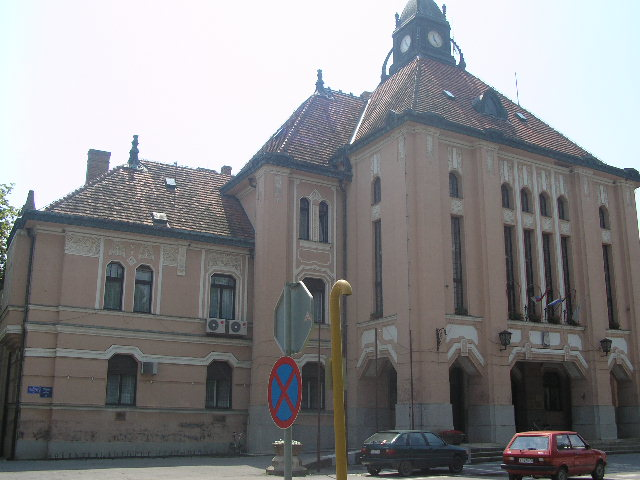
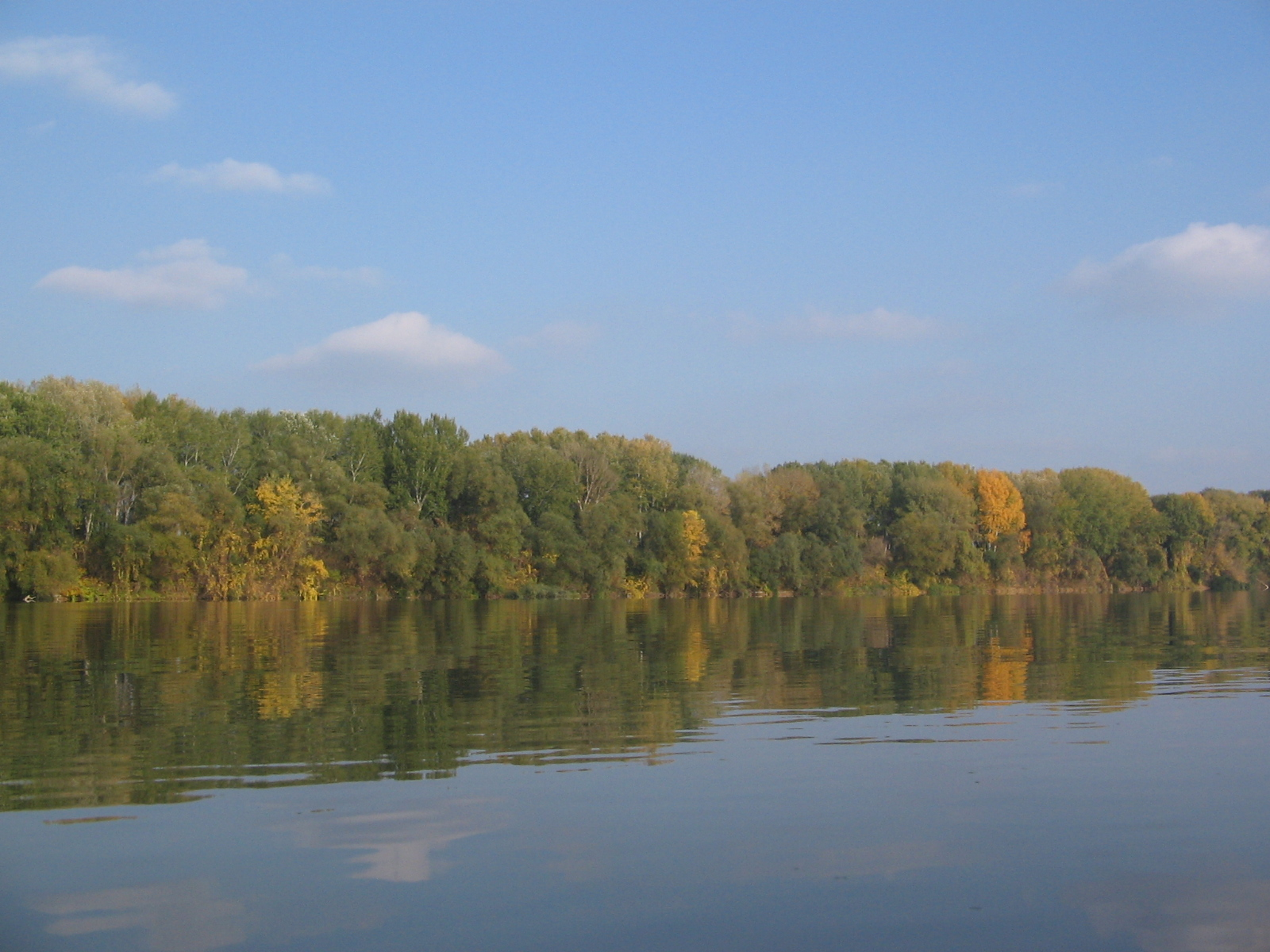
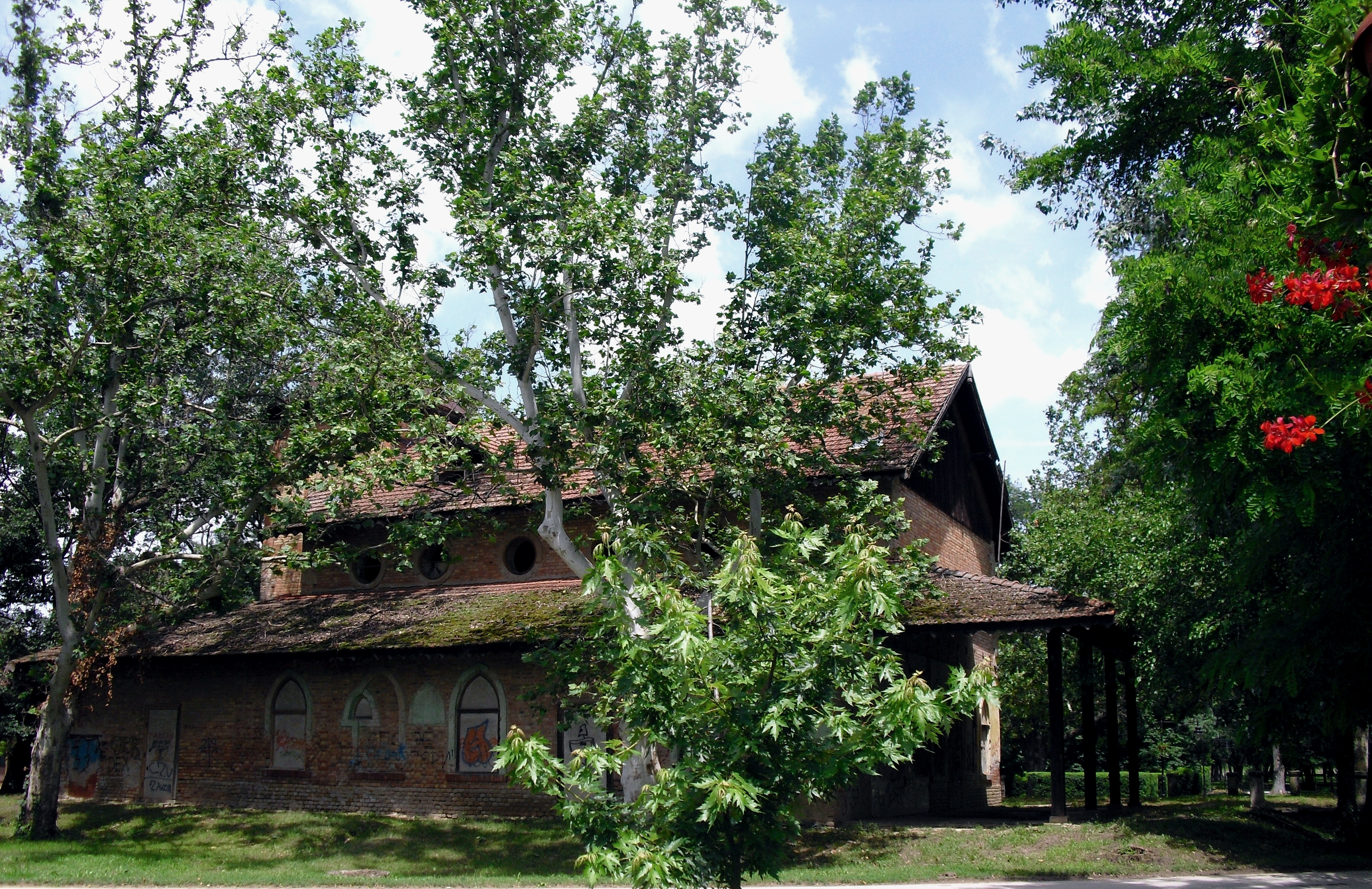
- Photos of Kanjiža

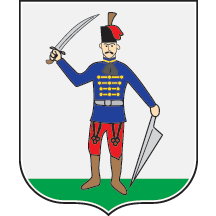
- Coat of arms

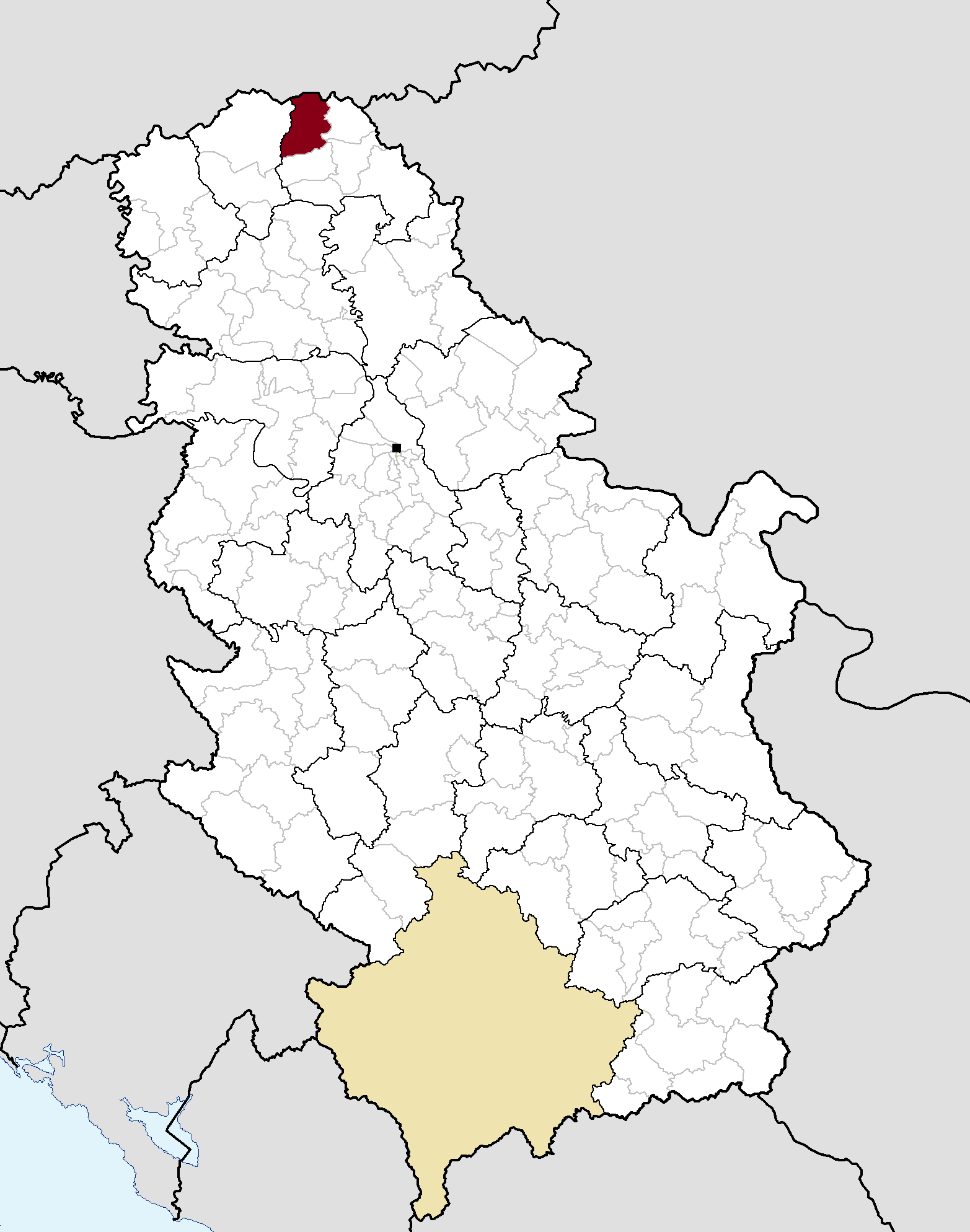
- Location of Kanjiža within Serbia
- Coordinates: 46°04′N 20°03′E
- Country: Serbia
- Province: Vojvodina
- District: North Banat

Government
  - Mayor: Róbert Fejsztámer (SVM)

Area
  - Total: 400 km^{2} (154 sq mi)
- Elevation: 80 m (260 ft)

Population (2022)
  - Total: 20,141
  - Administrative: 8,067
- Demonym(s): Kanjiža, (sr)
- Time zone: UTC+1 (CET)
  - Summer (DST): UTC+2 (CEST)
- Postal code: 24420
- Area code: +381(0)24
- Car plates: KA
- Official languages: Serbian together with Hungarian
- Website: http://www.kanjiza.rs

Kanjiža (Serbian Cyrillic: Кањижа, pronounced [kǎɲiʒa]) formerly Stara Kanjiža (Serbian Cyrillic: Стара Кањижа; Yiddish: קניזשא; Hungarian: Magyarkanizsa, formerly Kanizsa) is a town and municipality located in the North Banat District of the autonomous province of Vojvodina, Serbia. Kanjiža town has a population of 8,067, while the Kanjiža municipality has 20,141 inhabitants (2022 census).

== Geography ==
Although it belongs to the North Banat District, the territory of Kanjiža municipality is actually located in the region of Bačka. The territory of the municipality is bordered by the river Tisa and the Novi Kneževac Municipality in the east, the Municipality of Senta in the south, the Municipality of Subotica in the west, and the border with Hungary in the north. Its proximity to the border, the free-way, and the river Tisa makes it an important location.

== History ==
The town was mentioned in the Gesta Hungarorum chronicle under the name Kenesna, and, according to the chronicle, it belonged to the duchy of Bulgarian duke Salan who ruled from Titel in the 9th century. In the first written documents after the Hungarian conquest of Central Europe, the town is mentioned as Cnesa or Kenesna. This name came from the Slavic word knez 'prince'. In 1335, it was mentioned as Villa Canysa.

In the first half of the 16th century, the town was administered by the Eastern Hungarian Kingdom, until 1552 when it was administered by the Ottoman Empire (Sanjak of Çanad).

From 1686 to 1918, the town was administered by the Habsburg monarchy. Initially, it was part of the Habsburg Military Frontier, but was placed under civil administration in 1751. In the beginning of Ottoman administration, the local Hungarian population left this area. During the Ottoman period and also during the first decades of Habsburg administration, the town was mainly populated by ethnic Serbs. Hungarian colonists from the northern counties of the Kingdom of Hungary started to settle here in 1753, and they became the dominant ethnic group in the town. Since 1918, the town has been part of Serbia and subsequent Yugoslav states of which Serbia was a part.

== Inhabited places ==
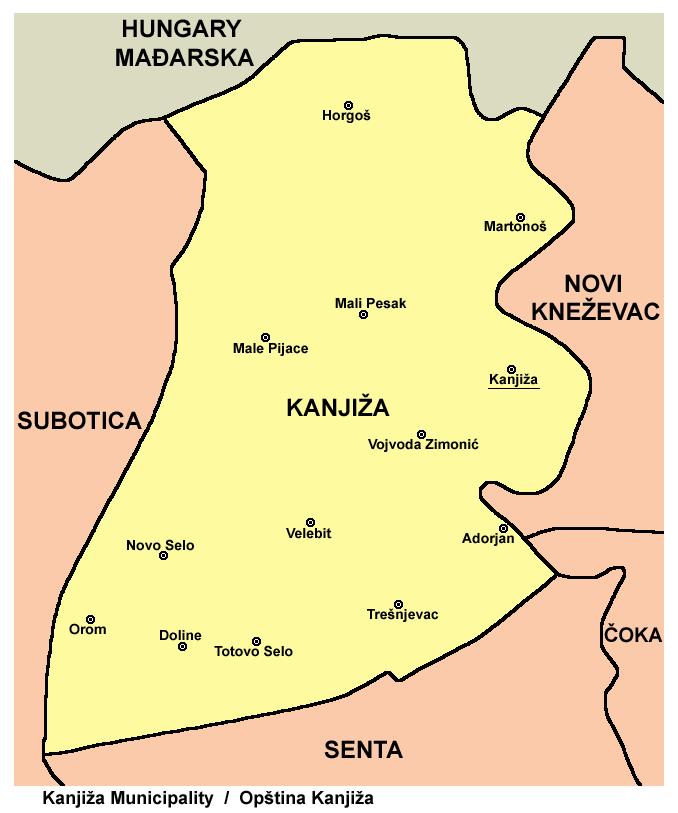
Map of Kanjiža municipality

The municipality of Kanjiža includes the town and 12 villages:

- Adorjan (Adorján)
- Doline (Völgyes)
- Horgoš (Horgos)
- Male Pijace (Kispiac)
- Mali Pesak (Kishomok)
- Martonoš (Martonos)
- Novo Selo (Újfalu)
- Orom (Orom)
- Totovo Selo (Tóthfalu)
- Trešnjevac (Oromhegyes)
- Velebit
- Zimonić (Ilonafalu)

Note: For the inhabited places with Hungarian ethnic majority, the names are also given in italics in Hungarian.

== Demographics ==
Historical population
Year	Pop.	±% p.a.
1948	36,334	—
1953	35,590	−0.41%
1961	34,960	−0.22%
1971	33,817	−0.33%
1981	32,709	−0.33%
1991	30,668	−0.64%
2002	27,510	−0.98%
2011	25,343	−0.91%
2022	20,141	−2.07%

According to the 2022 census results, the municipality of Kanjiža had a population of 20,141.

=== Ethnic groups ===
Almost all of the settlements in the municipality have Hungarian majorities, except Velebit, which is predominantly Serbian.

The ethnic composition of the municipality:

Ethnic group	Population	%
Hungarians	21,576	85.1%
Serbs	1,830	7.2%
Roma	596	2.3%
Romanians	268	1%
Albanians	79	0.3%
Croats	67	0.2%
Yugoslavs	51	0.2%
Bunjevci	33	0.1%
Others	843	3.3%
Total	25,343	

== Economy ==
The economy of Kanjiža is dominated by the Potisje-Tondach roof tile factory. Other firms are FIM Kanjiža, Keramika Kanjiža, various paprika refining firms, and the "Banja Kanjiža" spa health center.

The following table gives a preview of the total number of registered people employed in legal entities per their core activity (as of 2018):

Activity	Total
Agriculture, forestry and fishing	158
Mining and quarrying	24
Manufacturing	1,676
Electricity, gas, steam and air conditioning supply	32
Water supply; sewerage, waste management and remediation activities	48
Construction	217
Wholesale and retail trade, repair of motor vehicles and motorcycles	940
Transportation and storage	474
Accommodation and food services	168
Information and communication	32
Financial and insurance activities	78
Real estate activities	7
Professional, scientific and technical activities	134
Administrative and support service activities	140
Public administration and defense; compulsory social security	406
Education	475
Human health and social work activities	411
Arts, entertainment and recreation	23
Other service activities	117
Individual agricultural workers	736
Total	6,297

== Notable citizens ==
- Frank Arok, football player and former manager of the Socceroos
- Ferenc Barath (in Hungarian), graphic artist.
- Jozsef Beszedes (in Hungarian), Hungarian hydrotechnical engineer (19th century works).
- Zoltan Bicskei (in Hungarian), film director and graphic artist.
- Dragan Bošnjak, former Serbian football player
- Tibor Harsanyi (in Hungarian), Hungarian composer.
- Mika K. (Mirjana Kostic), Serbian singer and musician.
- Đorđe Krstić, Serbian realist painter.
- Josef Nadj (in French), choreographer, director and dancer.
- Dan Reisinger, Israeli designer of graphics, exhibitions, and stage sets.
- Otto Tolnai (in Hungarian), writer, poet, translator.

== Twin towns – sister cities ==
- Budaörs, Hungary
- Felsőzsolca, Hungary
- Ferencváros (Budapest), Hungary
- Kiskunhalas, Hungary
- Kráľovský Chlmec, Slovakia
- Nagykanizsa, Hungary
- Röszke, Hungary
- Sfântu Gheorghe, Romania
- Svilajnac, Serbia
- Tata, Hungary
- Vodice, Slovenia

== Gallery ==
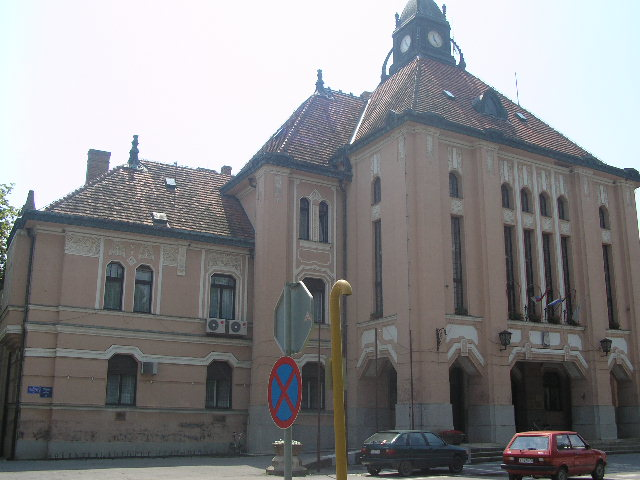
City Hall Kanjiža

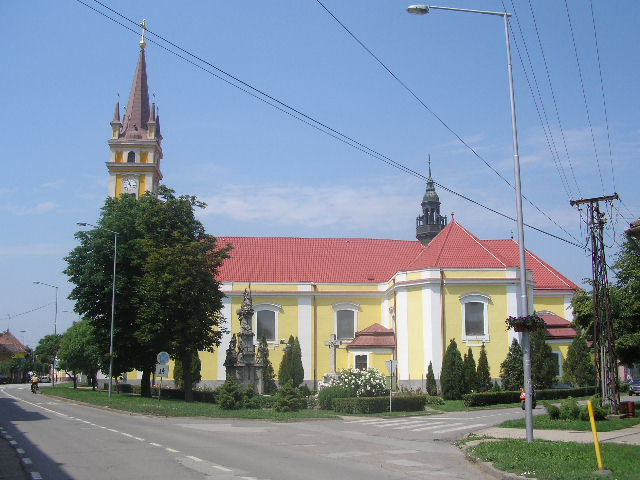
St. Archangels Catholic Church

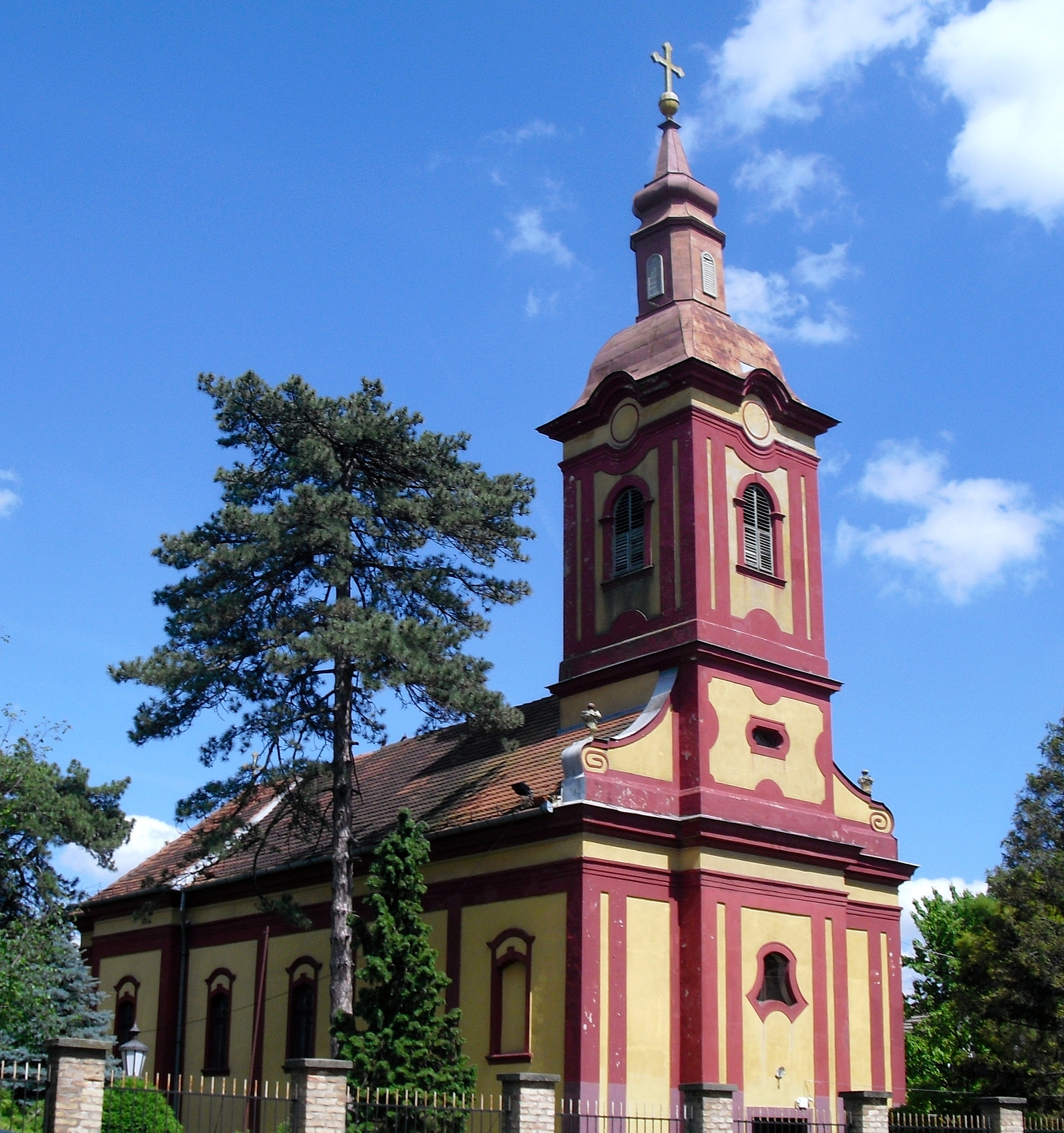
St. Archangel Michael Orthodox Church

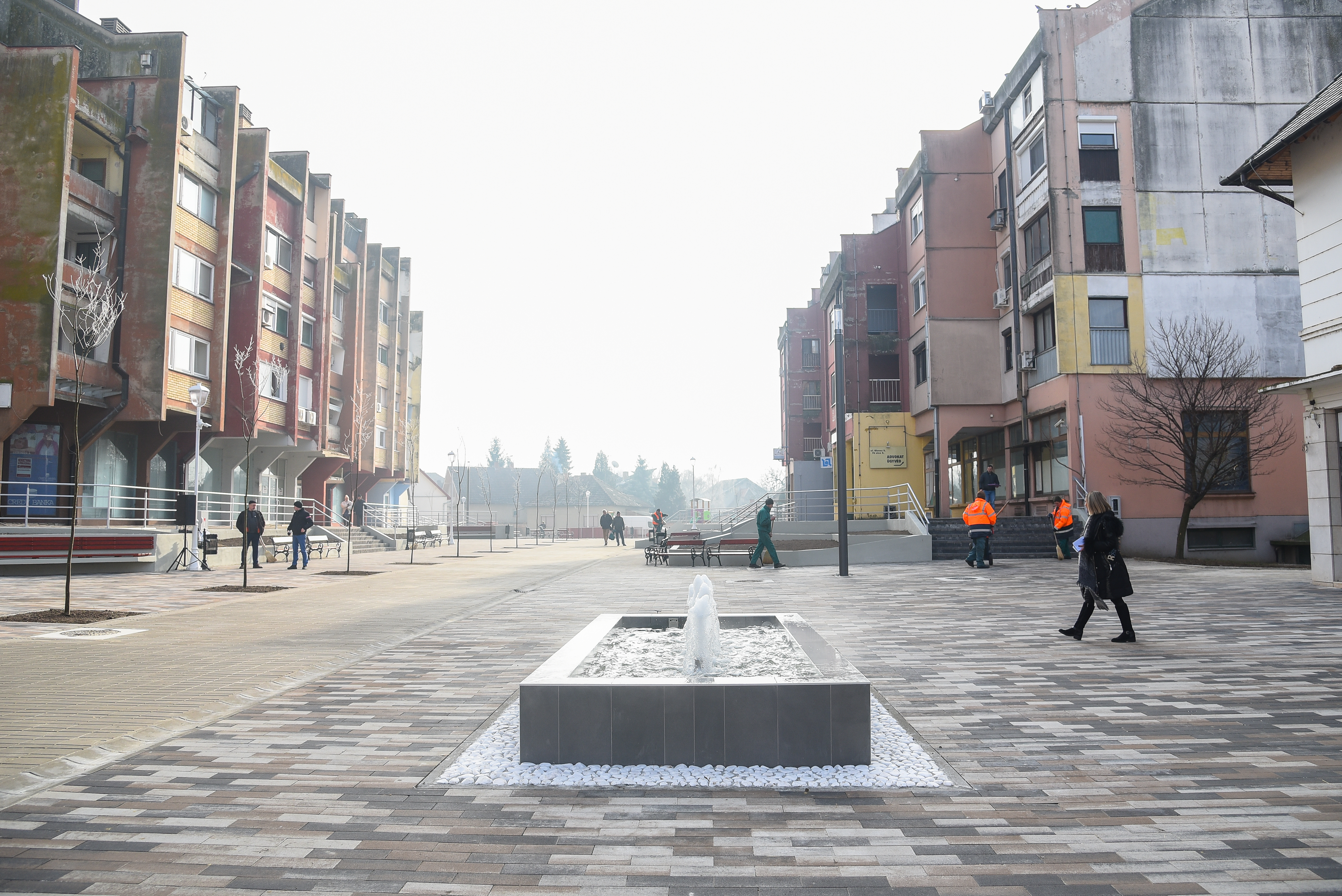
Square and Fountain in Kanjiža

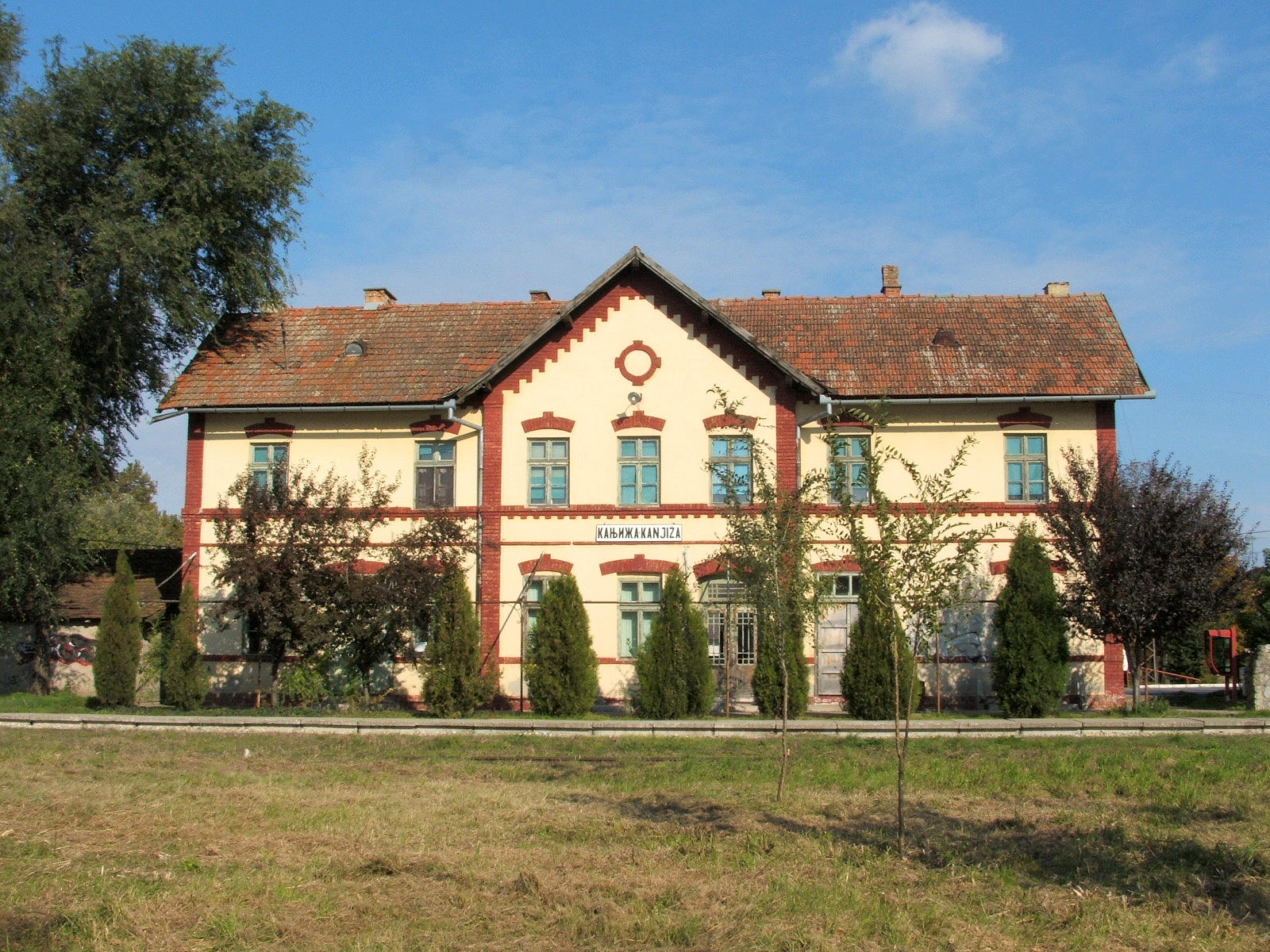
Train Station

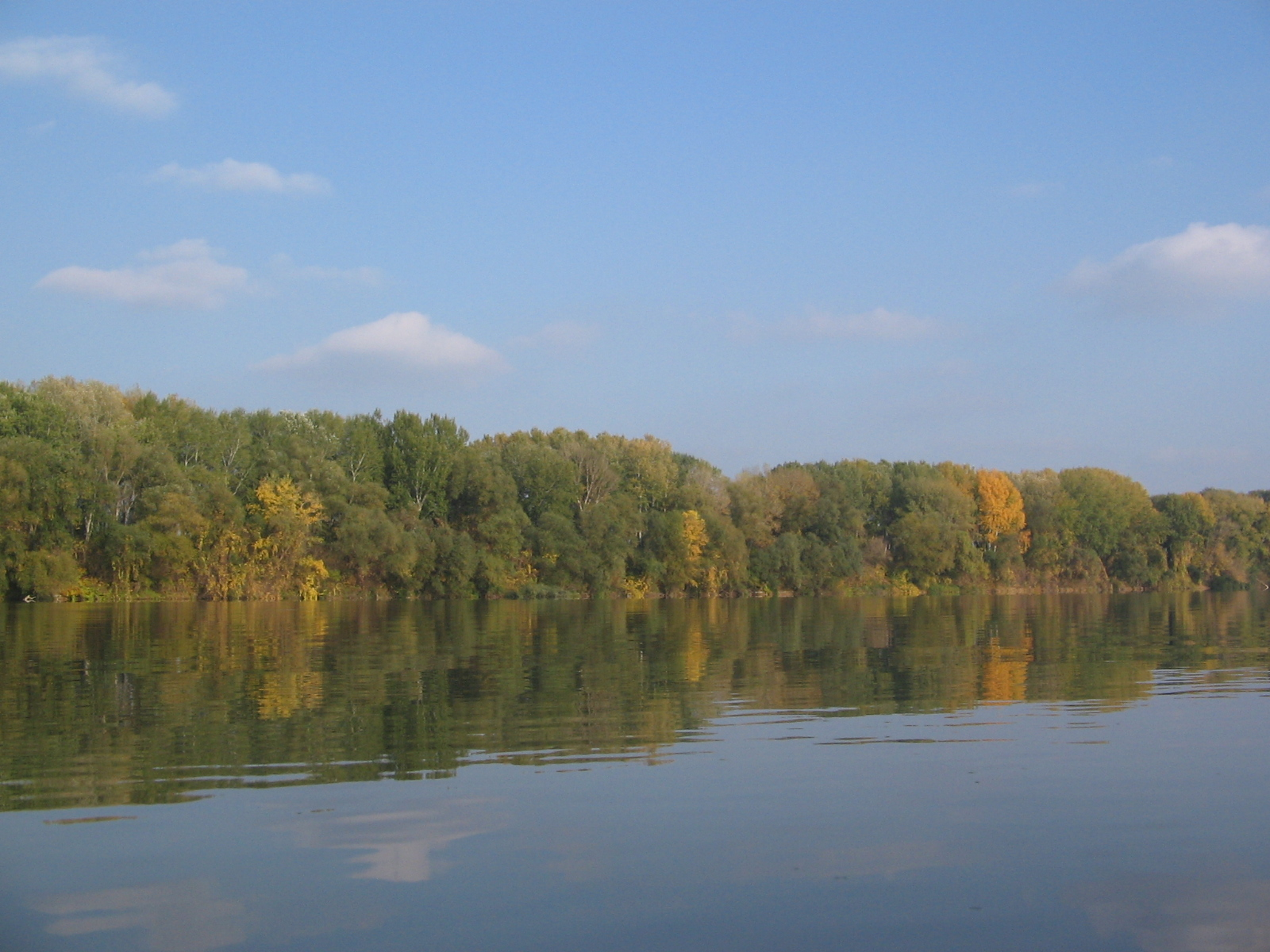
Tisa River

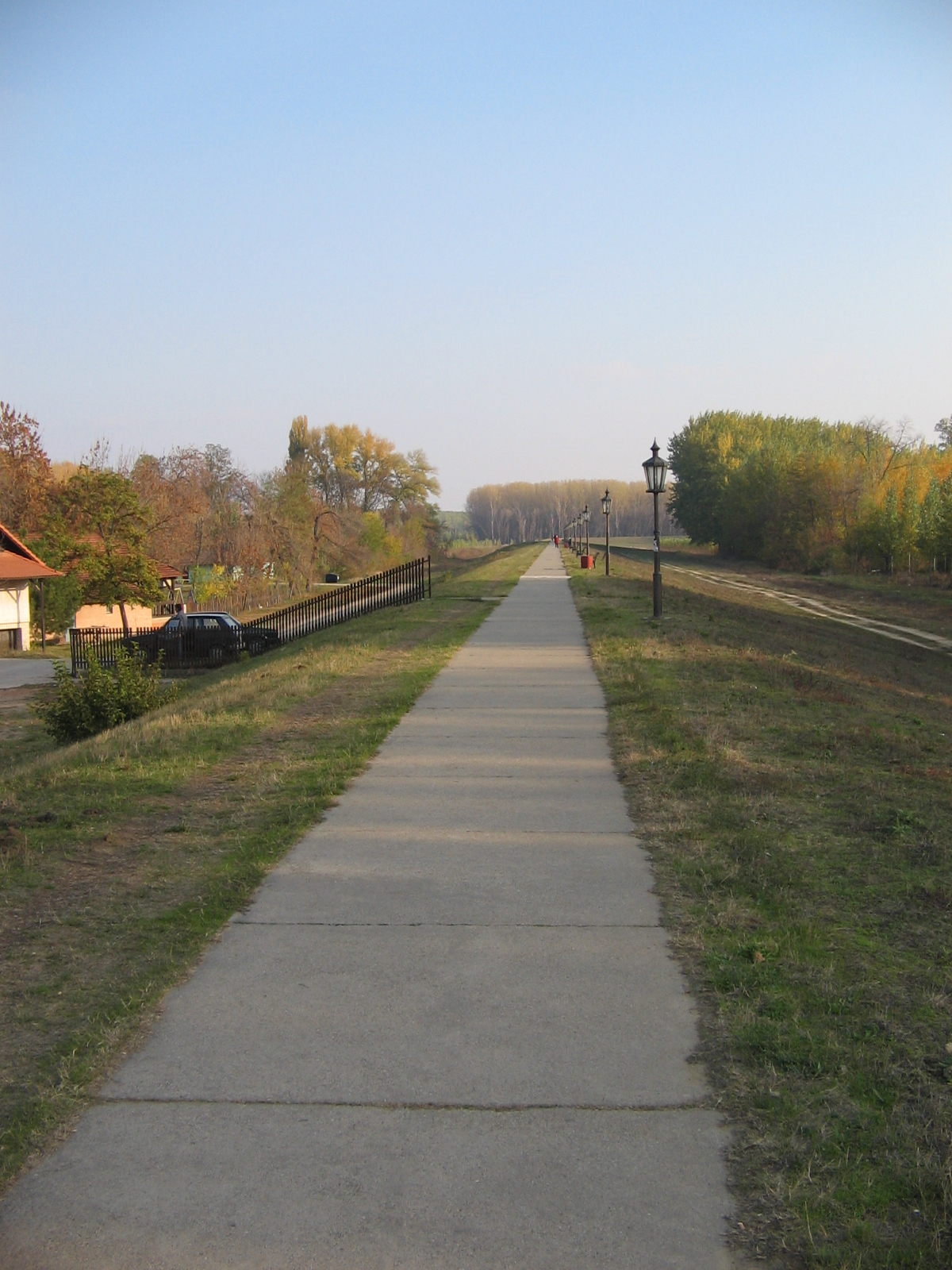
Trail by Tisa River

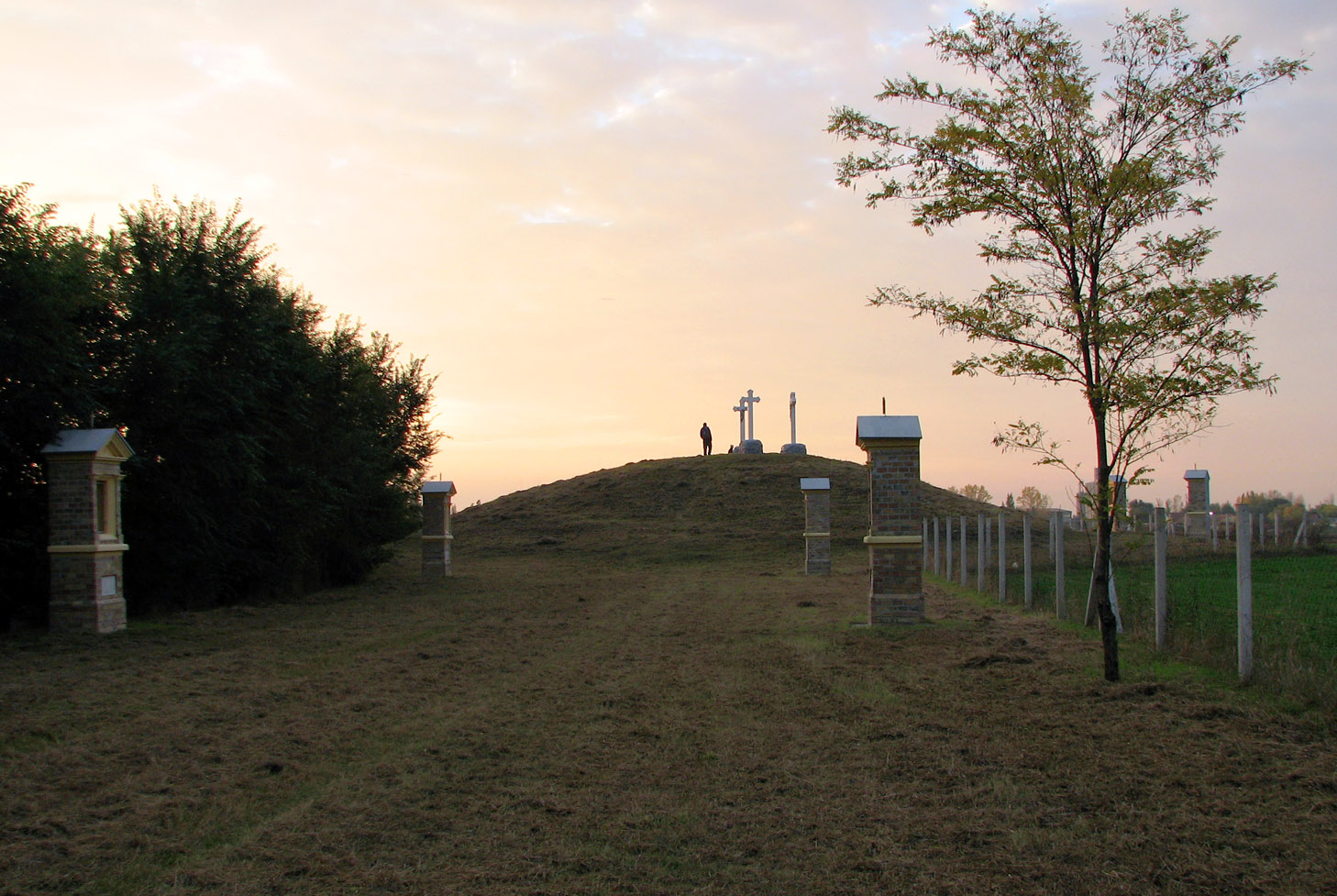
Calvary Hill (Kalvaria)

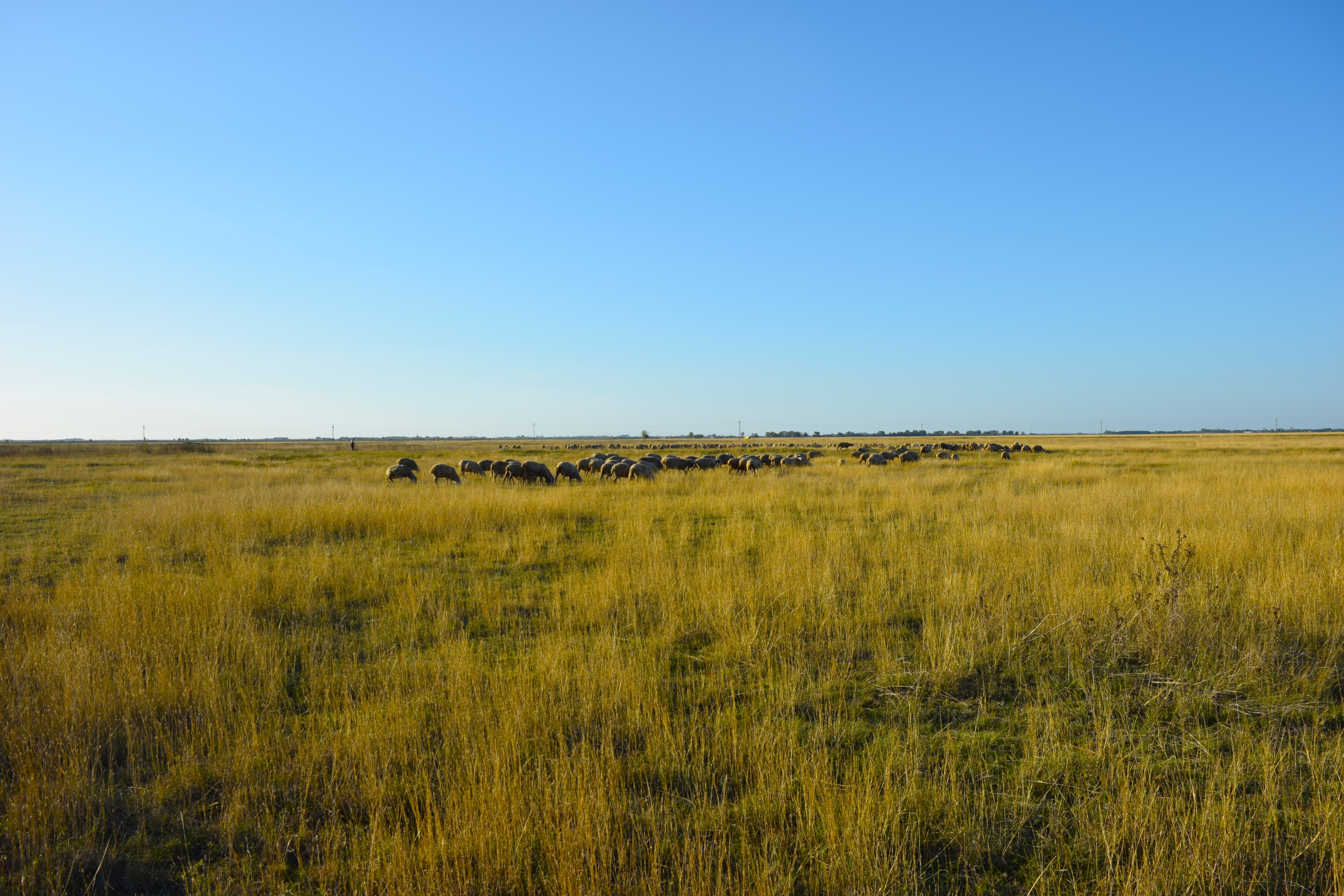
Pasture (grassland) near Kanjiza

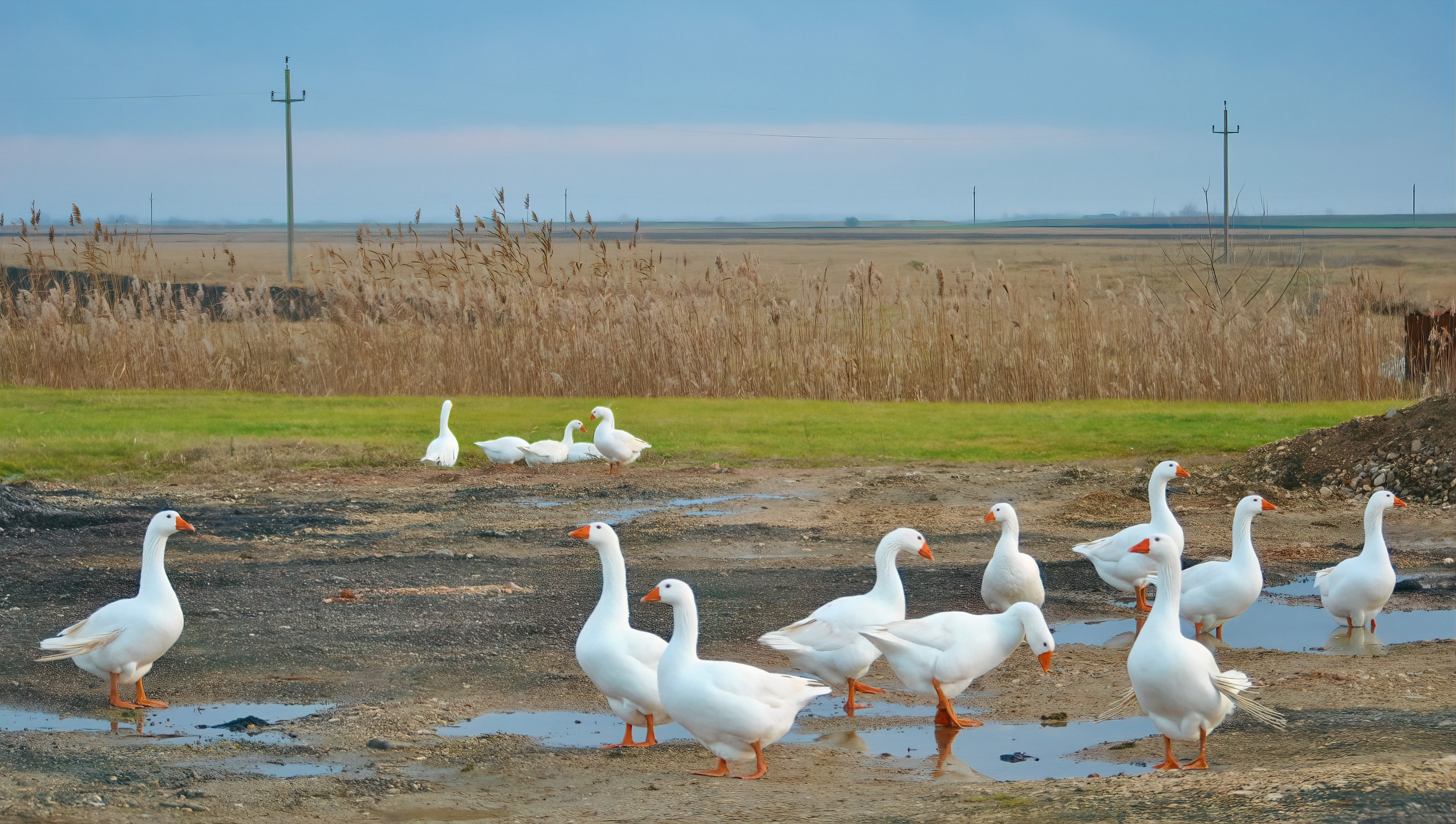
Pasture (grassland) near Kanjiza ("Captain Meadow")

== See also ==
- List of Hungarian communities in Vojvodina
