= Trešnjevac =

Trešnjevac Трешњевац (Serbian) Oromhegyes (Hungarian)
- Village (Selo)
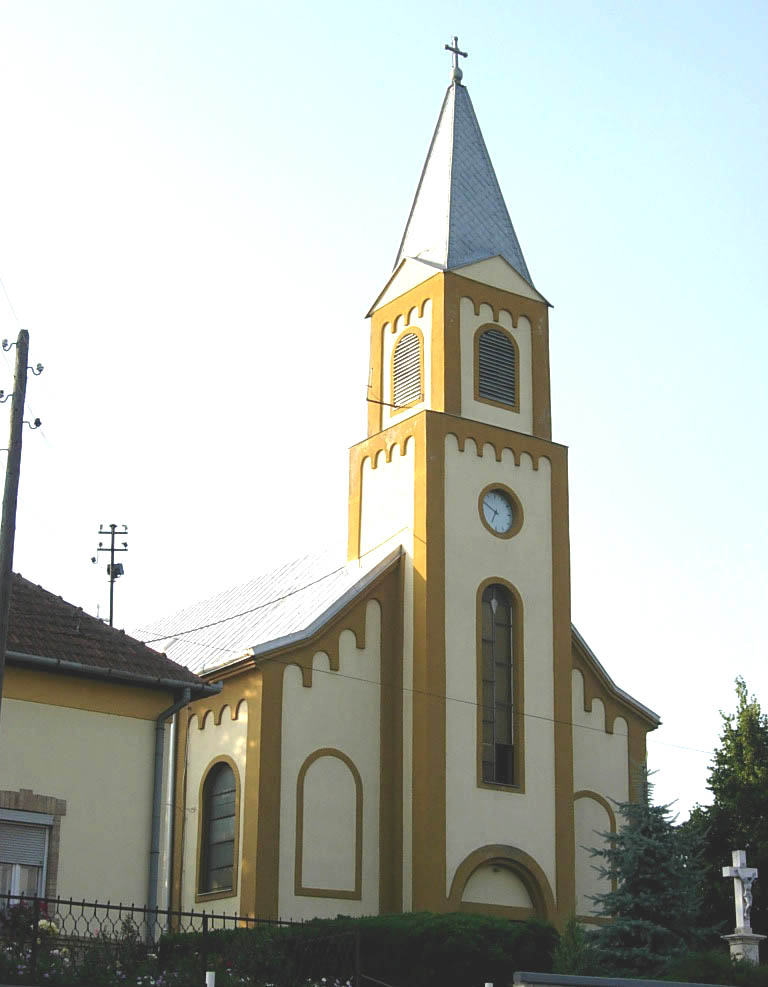
- The Saint Michael Archangel Catholic Church

- Location of Vojvoda Zimonić within Serbia Trešnjevac (Serbia) Trešnjevac (Europe)
- Coordinates: 45°58′28″N 19°59′06″E
- Country: Serbia
- Province: Vojvodina
- District: North Banat
- Municipalities: Kanjiža
- Elevation: 87 m (285 ft)

Population (2002)
  - Trešnjevac: 1,868
- Time zone: UTC+1 (CET)
  - Summer (DST): UTC+2 (CEST)
- Postal code: 24426
- Area code: +381(0)24
- Car plates: KA

Trešnjevac (Serbian Cyrillic: Трешњевац, Hungarian: Oromhegyes) is a village in Serbia. It is situated in the Kanjiža municipality, in the North Banat District, Vojvodina province. The village has a Hungarian ethnic majority (96.19%) and its population numbering 1,868 people (2002 census).

== History ==
Human communities have lived in this area as early as in the Stone Age. The first written record about the settlement is from 1271. The record mention it under the name Fel-Adrian. Modern Trešnjevac was founded around the 1850s.

== Historical population ==
- 1961: 2,357
- 1971: 2,304
- 1981: 2,135
- 1991: 2,028
- 2002: 1,868
- 2011: 1,763

== Features ==
The inhabitants of the village are mostly farmers; sheep breeding is one of the characteristic features of Trešnjevac.

== Politics ==
During the Bosnian War, the Zitzer Club (Zitzer Spiritual Republic) was an important gathering place for those, who resisted the ongoing war. The foreign media paid special attention to it.

== Cultural life ==
Gazdag Ág, organized in Trešnjevac, is one of the most important folk events in the municipality. It is a competition between folk organizations. The aim of the event is to give platform to the rich cultural heritage of ethnic Hungarian villages in the region. The German Filmmakers Marc Haenecke and Michael Leuthner shot a feature-length documentary about the Zitzer Club, which was broadcast on German TV and was shown on several film festivals.

== See also ==
- List of places in Serbia
- List of cities, towns and villages in Vojvodina
