= 1982–83 Yugoslav Second League =

Yugoslav Second League
- Season: 1982–83
- Champions: Čelik (West Division); Prishtina (East Division)
- Promoted: Čelik; Prishtina
- Relegated: Solin; Maribor; Kozara; Liria; Radnički Kragujevac; Dubočica; OFK Titograd; Lovćen

The 1982–83 Yugoslav Second League season was the 37th season of the Second Federal League (Croatian: Druga savezna liga, Serbian: Друга савезна лига, Slovenian: Druga zvezna liga, Macedonian: Втора сојузна лига, Albanian: Liga e Dytë te Jugosllavisë), the second level association football competition of SFR Yugoslavia, since its establishment in 1946. The league was contested in two regional groups (West Division and East Division), with 18 clubs each, two more than in the previous season.

== West Division ==
=== Teams ===
A total of eighteen teams contested the league, including thirteen sides from the 1981–82 season, one club relegated from the 1981–82 Yugoslav First League and four sides promoted from the Inter-Republic Leagues played in the 1981–82 season. The league was contested in a double round robin format, with each club playing every other club twice, for a total of 34 rounds. Two points were awarded for wins and one point for draws.

NK Zagreb were relegated from the 1981–82 Yugoslav First League after finishing in the 18th place of the league table. The four clubs promoted to the second level were Maribor, Novi Sad, Radnik Bijeljina and Varteks.

Locations of teams' home cities in the 1982–83 Yugoslav Second League West

Team	Location	Federal subject	Position in 1981–82
AIK Bačka Topola	Bačka Topola	(Socialist Republic of Serbia) SAP Vojvodina	10th
Borac Banja Luka	Banja Luka	SR Bosnia and Herzegovina	4th
Čelik	Zenica	SR Bosnia and Herzegovina	3rd
GOŠK-Jug	Dubrovnik	SR Croatia	11th
Iskra	Bugojno	SR Bosnia and Herzegovina	5th
Jedinstvo Bihać	Bihać	SR Bosnia and Herzegovina	9th
Jedinstvo Brčko	Brčko	SR Bosnia and Herzegovina	14th
Kikinda	Kikinda	(Socialist Republic of Serbia) SAP Vojvodina	6th
Kozara	Bosanska Gradiška	SR Bosnia and Herzegovina	12th
Leotar	Trebinje	SR Bosnia and Herzegovina	7th
Maribor	Maribor	SR Slovenia	—
Novi Sad	Novi Sad	(Socialist Republic of Serbia) SAP Vojvodina	—
Proleter Zrenjanin	Zrenjanin	(Socialist Republic of Serbia) SAP Vojvodina	8th
Radnik Bijeljina	Bijeljina	SR Bosnia and Herzegovina	—
Solin	Solin	SR Croatia	13th
Spartak Subotica	Subotica	(Socialist Republic of Serbia) SAP Vojvodina	2nd
Varteks	Varaždin	SR Croatia	—
NK Zagreb	Zagreb	SR Croatia	—

=== League table ===
Pos	Team	Pld	W	D	L	GF	GA	GD	Pts	Promotion or relegation
1	Čelik (C, P)	34	20	8	6	50	23	+27	48	Promotion to Yugoslav First League
2	Iskra	34	20	7	7	58	34	+24	47	
3	Jedinstvo Brčko	34	17	4	13	40	38	+2	38	
4	Spartak Subotica	34	14	9	11	53	39	+14	37	
5	Leotar	34	15	7	12	43	33	+10	37	
6	GOŠK-Jug	34	13	10	11	45	37	+8	36	
7	Proleter Zrenjanin	34	13	10	11	41	40	+1	36	
8	Kikinda	34	12	11	11	44	33	+11	35	
9	Novi Sad	34	14	7	13	38	38	0	35	
10	Varteks	34	14	7	13	48	49	−1	35	
11	Borac Banja Luka	34	12	10	12	51	39	+12	34	
12	NK Zagreb	34	12	8	14	47	50	−3	32	
13	Jedinstvo Bihać	34	11	9	14	35	44	−9	31	
14	AIK Bačka Topola	34	13	5	16	37	48	−11	31	
15	Radnik	34	8	14	12	35	44	−9	30	
16	Solin (R)	34	9	11	14	27	50	−23	29	Relegation to Inter-Republic Leagues
17	Maribor (R)	34	7	12	15	25	42	−17	26	Relegation to Inter-Republic Leagues
18	Kozara (R)	34	4	7	23	29	65	−36	15	Relegation to Inter-Republic Leagues

Source: fsgzrenjanin.com
Rules for classification: 1) points; 2) goal difference; 3) number of goals scored.
(C) Champions; (P) Promoted; (R) Relegated

== East Division ==
=== Teams ===
A total of eighteen teams contested the league, including thirteen sides from the 1981–82 season, one club relegated from the 1981–82 Yugoslav First League and four sides promoted from the Inter-Republic Leagues played in the 1981–82 season. The league was contested in a double round robin format, with each club playing every other club twice, for a total of 34 rounds. Two points were awarded for wins and one point for draws.

Teteks were relegated from the 1981–82 Yugoslav First League after finishing in the 17th place of the league table. The four clubs promoted to the second level were Lovćen, Pelister, Radnički Pirot and Vlaznimi Đakovica.

Locations of teams' home cities in the 1982–83 Yugoslav Second League East

Team	Location	Federal subject	Position in 1981–82
Bor	Bor	SR Serbia	6th
Borac Čačak	Čačak	SR Serbia	10th
Dubočica	Leskovac	SR Serbia	13th
Liria	Prizren	(Socialist Republic of Serbia) SAP Kosovo	12th
Lovćen	Cetinje	SR Montenegro	—
Napredak Kruševac	Kruševac	SR Serbia	8th
Pelister	Bitola	SR Macedonia	—
Prishtina	Pristina	(Socialist Republic of Serbia) SAP Kosovo	9th
Rad	Belgrade	SR Serbia	7th
Radnički Kragujevac	Kragujevac	SR Serbia	11th
Radnički Pirot	Pirot	SR Serbia	—
Sloboda Titovo Užice	Titovo Užice	SR Serbia	4th
Sutjeska	Nikšić	SR Montenegro	5th
OFK Titograd	Titograd	SR Montenegro	14th
Teteks	Tetovo	SR Macedonia	—
Timok	Zaječar	SR Serbia	3rd
Trepča	Kosovska Mitrovica	(Socialist Republic of Serbia) SAP Kosovo	2nd
Vlaznimi Đakovica	Đakovica	(Socialist Republic of Serbia) SAP Kosovo	—

=== League table ===
Pos	Team	Pld	W	D	L	GF	GA	GD	Pts	Promotion or relegation
1	Prishtina (C, P)	34	20	9	5	65	30	+35	49	Promotion to Yugoslav First League
2	Sutjeska Nikšić	34	19	8	7	59	31	+28	46	
3	Teteks	34	15	8	11	40	31	+9	38	
4	Bor	34	16	6	12	49	42	+7	38	
5	Pelister	34	15	6	13	52	36	+16	36	
6	Trepča	34	14	7	13	45	33	+12	35	
7	Rad	34	15	5	14	51	46	+5	35	
8	Napredak Kruševac	34	15	5	14	45	48	−3	35	
9	Borac Čačak	34	13	8	13	53	44	+9	34	
10	Timok	34	11	12	11	28	23	+5	34	
11	Sloboda Titovo Užice	34	10	14	10	24	27	−3	34	
12	Radnički Pirot	34	12	10	12	38	43	−5	34	
13	Vlaznimi Đakovica	34	11	12	11	29	34	−5	34	
14	Liria (R)	34	12	9	13	25	34	−9	33	Relegation to Inter-Republic Leagues
15	Radnički Kragujevac (R)	34	10	12	12	51	54	−3	32	Relegation to Inter-Republic Leagues
16	Dubočica (R)	34	7	9	18	23	53	−30	23	Relegation to Inter-Republic Leagues
17	OFK Titograd (R)	34	6	10	18	23	61	−38	22	Relegation to Inter-Republic Leagues
18	Lovćen (R)	34	6	8	20	24	54	−30	20	Relegation to Inter-Republic Leagues

Source: fsgzrenjanin.com
Rules for classification: 1) points; 2) goal difference; 3) number of goals scored.
(C) Champions; (P) Promoted; (R) Relegated

== See also ==
- 1982–83 Yugoslav First League
- 1982–83 Yugoslav Cup
