= Mali Pesak =

Mali Pesak Мали Песак (Serbian) Kishomok (Hungarian)
- Village (Selo)
- Location of Vojvoda Zimonić within Serbia Mali Pesak (Serbia) Mali Pesak (Europe)
- Coordinates: 46°04′00″N 19°58′00″E
- Country: Serbia
- Province: Vojvodina
- District: North Banat
- Municipalities: Kanjiža
- Elevation: 81 m (266 ft)

Population (2002)
  - Mali Pesak: 115
- Time zone: UTC+1 (CET)
  - Summer (DST): UTC+2 (CEST)
- Area code: +381(0)24
- Car plates: KA

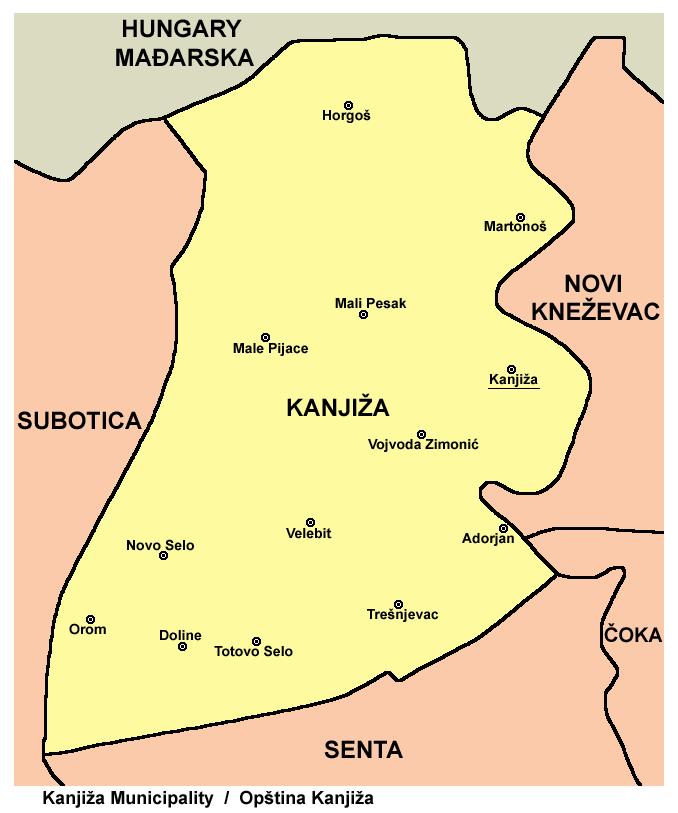
Related map

Mali Pesak (in Serbian Cyrillic: Мали Песак, in Hungarian: Kishomok) is a village in Serbia. It is situated in the Kanjiža municipality, in the North Banat District, Vojvodina province. The village has a Hungarian ethnic majority (100.0%) and its population numbering 115 people (2002 census).

== See also ==
- List of places in Serbia
- List of cities, towns and villages in Vojvodina
