= Ranko Đorđić =

Bosnian-Herzegovinian footballer and manager

Personal information
- Date of birth: 1 January 1957 (age 69)
- Place of birth: Zenica, FPR Yugoslavia
- Position: Midfielder

Senior career*
| Years | Team | Apps | (Gls) |
| 1974–1979 | Željezničar Sarajevo | 105 | (10) |
| 1979–1981 | Čelik Zenica | 55 | (21) |
| 1981–1985 | Red Star Belgrade | 64 | (12) |
| 1985–1988 | IFK Norrköping | 73 | (12) |
| Total | | 297 | (55) |

Managerial career
- 2001–2006: Spårvägens FF
- 2006–2008: Vasalunds IF
- 2010–2011: Valsta Syrianska IK
- * Club domestic league appearances and goals

Ranko Đorđić (Serbian Cyrillic: Ранко Ђорђић; born 1 January 1957) is a Bosnian-Herzegovinian football manager and former player.

== Club career ==
After playing several years in Yugoslav First League clubs FK Željezničar Sarajevo and NK Čelik Zenica, in 1981 Đorđić moved to Red Star Belgrade where he would win the 1983–84 Yugoslav championship and the 1985 Yugoslav Cup. Afterwards, he moved abroad to Sweden and signed with IFK Norrköping, where he won the Swedish Cup in 1988 before leaving the club the same year.

Đorđić began his coaching career in 2001.

== Personal life ==
Đorđić's son, Bojan Djordjic is also a former footballer.

== Honours ==
IFK Norrköping

- Svenska Cupen: 1987–88
