= Gordan Mohor =

Croatian footballer

Personal information
- Full name: Gordan Mohor
- Date of birth: 25 April 1964 (age 62)
- Place of birth: Zagreb, Croatia
- Height: 1.84 m (6 ft 0 in)
- Position: Goalkeeper

Senior career*
| Years | Team | Apps | (Gls) |
| 1982–1986 | Dinamo Zagreb | | |
| 1983–1984 | → Zagreb (loan) | 23 | |
| 1987 | BSK | | |
| 1987–1988 | Iskra Bugojno | | |
| 1988–1990 | Olimpija | 44 | |
| 1992–1993 | Studio D Novo Mesto | 26 | (0) |
- * Club domestic league appearances and goals

Gordan Mohor (born in 1964 in Zagreb) is a Croatian retired footballer.

== Career ==
As a product of Dinamo Zagreb youth team, he signed the contract for his hometown club at the age of 18. But, since he had big, more experienced competition (Vlak, Stojić, Ladić) he played mostly in friendly matches. So, after being previously loaned to Zagreb, he left the club and went to play for BSK and Iskra Bugojno. While playing for the latter one, he earned maximum grade for his performance in cup match against Partizan Belgrade. After a season in Bugojno, he moved to Ljubljana to play for Olimpija. With that club he managed to achieve promotion to first Yugoslav league. He finished his career playing for Studio D Novo Mesto in newly formed Slovenian league. After hanging up the boots, he went into wine distribution business.
