= Dušan Nikolić =

Yugoslav footballer (1953–2018)

Personal information
- Full name: Dušan Nikolić
- Date of birth: 23 January 1953
- Place of birth: Belgrade, SFR Yugoslavia
- Date of death: 15 December 2018 (aged 65)
- Place of death: Belgrade, Serbia
- Position: Midfielder

Senior career*
Years	Team	Apps	(Gls)
1970–1980	Red Star Belgrade	129	(5)
1980–1982	Bolton Wanderers	22	(2)
1982	Teteks Tetovo	3	(0)
1982–1983	OFK Beograd	16	(1)

International career
1976–1977	Yugoslavia	4	(1)
- * Club domestic league appearances and goals

Dušan Nikolić (Serbian Cyrillic: Душан Николић; 23 January 1953 – 15 December 2018) was a Yugoslav footballer.

== Club career ==
Nikolić played 10 years for Yugoslav giants Red Star Belgrade, scoring 5 goals in 307 games.

He was the second player (after Taddy Nowak) from continental Europe to play for English side Bolton Wanderers.

== International career ==
Nikolić played 4 matches for Yugoslavia in 1976 and 1977, scoring one goal.
