= Aleksandar Stojanović =

Personal information
- Full name: Aleksandar Stojanović
- Date of birth: 19 June 1954 (age 72)
- Place of birth: Kragujevac, FPR Yugoslavia
- Height: 6 ft 4 in (1.93 m)
- Position: Goalkeeper

Senior career*
| Years | Team | Apps | (Gls) |
| 1971–1976 | Radnički Kragujevac | 69 | (0) |
| 1976–1983 | Red Star Belgrade | 143 | (0) |
| 1983–1985 | Egaleo | 54 | (0) |
| 1985 | Diagoras | 11 | (0) |
| 1986 | Vojvodina | 8 | (0) |
| Total | | 285 | (0) |

International career
| 1979 | Yugoslavia | 2 | (0) |

Managerial career
- Red Star Belgrade (Gk coach)
- Levski Sofia (Gk coach)
- Lokomotiv Moscow (Gk coach)
Medal record
Men's Football
Representing Yugoslavia
Mediterranean Games
| Gold medal – first place | UEFA U-21 Euro | 1978 |
| Gold medal – first place | 1979 Split | Team |
- * Club domestic league appearances and goals

Aleksandar "Dika" Stojanović (Serbian Cyrillic: Александар Стојановић Дика; born 19 June 1954) is a Serbian retired football goalkeeper. He got 2 caps for Yugoslavia.

== Career ==
After playing 5 seasons with his home town club Radnički Kragujevac, he moved, in 1976, to Red Star Belgrade. In the seven years that he played in Belgrade, he won three national championships and one cup. He is also remembered as the goalkeeper that did nothing but applaud after the memorable volley of Diego Maradona, playing in a European Cup match against FC Barcelona. After this successful seasons with Red Star, he decided to move abroad playing in Greece with Egaleo F.C., between 1983 and 1986, and also with Diagoras F.C. in the first half of the 1986-87 season. The rest of that last season he played back in Yugoslavia, this time with the ambitious FK Vojvodina, after helping them win the Yugoslav Second League in 1987, he decided to retire.

He played two friendly matches for the Yugoslavia national football team, both in 1979.

After retiring, he begin his career as a goalkeeping coach having, among others, worked with the renowned coach Slavoljub Muslin in Red Star Belgrade, Levski Sofia and Russian FC Lokomotiv Moscow.

== Honours ==
Radnički Kragujevac

- Yugoslav Second League: 1973–74

Red Star Belgrade

- Yugoslav First League: 1976–77, 1979–80, 1980–81
- Yugoslav Cup: 1981–82
- UEFA Cup: Runner-up 1978–79

Vojvodina

- Yugoslav Second League: 1986–87 - West Division

=== International ===
Yugoslavia

- UEFA Under-21 Championship: 1978
- Mediterranean Games: 1979
