= Tomislav Ivković =

Croatian footballer and manager (born 1960)

Personal information
- Date of birth: 11 August 1960 (age 66)
- Place of birth: Zagreb, PR Croatia, FPR Yugoslavia
- Height: 1.89 m (6 ft 2 in)
- Position: Goalkeeper

Senior career*
Years	Team	Apps	(Gls)
1978–1982	Dinamo Zagreb	53	(1)
1983	Dinamo Vinkovci	15	(0)
1983–1985	Red Star Belgrade	46	(0)
1985–1986	Tirol Innsbruck	23	(0)
1986–1988	Swarovski Tirol	65	(1)
1988	Wiener Sport-Club	15	(0)
1989	Genk	14	(0)
1989–1993	Sporting CP	133	(0)
1993	Estoril	9	(0)
1994	Vitória Setúbal	17	(0)
1994–1996	Belenenses	64	(0)
1996–1997	Salamanca	6	(0)
1997–1998	Estrela Amadora	34	(0)
Total		494	(2)

International career
1983–1991	Yugoslavia	38	(0)

Managerial career
- 2010: Međimurje
- 2011–2015: Lokomotiva
- 2016: Lokomotiva
- 2016–2017: Al Faisaly
- 2017–2018: Slaven Belupo
- 2018–2019: Rudeš
- 2020–2021: Inter Zaprešić
- 2021: Željezničar
- 2022: Borac Banja Luka
Medal record
Men's football
Representing Yugoslavia
Mediterranean Games
Gold medal – first place	1979 Split	Team
Olympic Games
Third place	1984 Los Angeles	Team
- * Club domestic league appearances and goals

Tomislav Ivković (born 11 August 1960) is a Croatian professional football manager, executive and former player.

During his playing career, which spanned two decades, he competed mostly in Portugal, appearing for five clubs including Sporting CP. Ivković was also a Yugoslavian international in the late 1980s and early 1990s, representing the nation in one World Cup and one European Championship.

In 2010, he started working as a manager. During his managerial career, Ivković managed Međimurje, Lokomotiva, Al Faisaly, Slaven Belupo, Rudeš, Inter Zaprešić, Željezničar and Borac Banja Luka.

Before becoming its manager, from January until April 2022, he worked as sporting director of Borac.

== Club career ==
Ivković was born in Zagreb, PR Croatia, Yugoslavia. He started his professional career playing for hometown club Dinamo Zagreb in 1978.

In January 1983, following a fight with Dinamo's head coach Ćiro Blažević, Ivković was transferred on loan to Dinamo Vinkovci.

During the summer 1983 offseason, Ivković returned from the loan and was back in Zagreb. However, the row with coach Blažević persisted and he was immediately sold to Red Star Belgrade during the summer transfer window, ahead of the 1983-84 season.

In 1985, Ivković transferred to his first foreign club as he joined Tirol Innsbruck from Austria, where he played until 1988. After short spells with Wiener Sport-Club and Genk, he moved to Sporting CP in 1989, and remained there for the following four seasons, rarely missing a game, although he did not collect any silverware.

Ivković's final years were also spent in Portugal, with Estoril, Vitória Setúbal, Belenenses and Estrela Amadora, before retiring in 1998. Prior to Estrela, he contributed with six matches for Salamanca's 1997 promotion to the La Liga, retiring finally at 38.

== International career ==
Ivković earned 38 caps for the Yugoslavia national team, between 1983 and 1991. His first major tournament was UEFA Euro 1984 in France, where he was second-choice behind Zoran Simović: the nation lost all of its three group matches at the tournament, and his only appearance came in the second game, a 5–0 defeat to Denmark; during the same year, he also won the bronze medal at the 1984 Summer Olympics in Los Angeles.

Ivković went on to start for Yugoslavia at the 1990 FIFA World Cup in Italy, appearing in all of the team's five games before they were defeated by Argentina on penalties in the quarter-finals: in that match, he became famous for saving Diego Maradona's kick during the penalty shootout (mere months earlier, he had already saved a penalty from the same player in UEFA Cup action, when Sporting played Napoli, and the two allegedly had a bet on the possible outcome of another penalty before their World Cup match, which the Yugoslav won).

His final international was a September 1991 friendly match away against Sweden.

== Managerial career ==
Starting in 2004, Ivković was the goalkeeping coach of the Croatia national team, during Zlatko Kranjčar's time as head coach. He left the post in July 2006, as the contracts of the entire coaching staff were not renewed after the national team failed to reach the knock-out stages of the 2006 World Cup.

In 2007, Ivković began his sole managerial career, first as an assistant manager at United Arab Emirates' Al-Shaab. Two years later, he had his first bench experience, serving as assistant manager at Persepolis.

In April 2010, Ivković got his first job as manager at Međimurje, in the 1. HNL. During his short one-month spell, the team recorded two wins, one draw and four defeats, eventually ranking in 15th position, out of 16 teams, with the subsequent relegation. After Međimurje, Ivković worked as a manager at Lokomotiva, Al Faisaly, Slaven Belupo, Rudeš and Inter Zaprešić.

On 18 June 2021, he became the new manager of Bosnian Premier League club Željezničar. In his first game as Željezničar manager, Ivković's team drew against Borac Banja Luka in a league match on 17 July 2021. Ivković's first loss as the club's manager was against Tuzla City in a league game a week later, on 24 July. He guided the team to his first win as manager in a league game against Posušje on 31 July 2021. In his first ever Sarajevo derby, Ivković's Željezničar lost to fierce city rivals Sarajevo in a league match on 22 September 2021. On 24 December 2021, he terminated his contract with Željezničar and left the club.

Three months after becoming its sporting director, on 4 April 2022, Ivković was named as Borac Banja Luka's new manager following Nemanja Miljanović's resignation. Ivković's debut was a 1–1 home draw with Zrinjski Mostar on 9 April 2022. He won his first game on 23 April, defeating Radnik Bijeljina 1–0 at home. Ivković lost his first game on 15 May 2022, with a 2–1 away defeat against Sloboda Tuzla. He left Borac in June 2022.

== Executive career ==
On 10 January 2022, Ivković became sporting director of Bosnian Premier League club Borac Banja Luka. He left the post on 4 April 2022 to become Borac's manager.

== Managerial statistics ==
As of 29 May 2022

Team	From	To	Record				
Team	From	To	G	W	D	L	Win %
Međimurje	April 2010	June 2010	7	2	1	4	28.57
Lokomotiva	23 December 2011	11 May 2015	121	51	26	44	42.15
Lokomotiva	25 July 2016	4 November 2016	19	7	3	9	36.84
Al Faisaly	14 November 2016	17 February 2017	12	3	4	5	25.00
Slaven Belupo	29 October 2017	10 November 2018	39	12	13	14	30.77
Rudeš	23 December 2018	4 June 2019	18	3	2	13	16.67
Inter Zaprešić	8 April 2020	6 March 2021	31	5	5	21	16.13
Željezničar	18 June 2021	24 December 2021	21	7	8	6	33.33
Borac Banja Luka	4 April 2022	3 June 2022	9	3	4	2	33.33
Total			277	93	66	118	33.57

== Honours ==
=== Player ===
Dinamo Zagreb

- Yugoslav Cup: 1979–80

Red Star Belgrade

- Yugoslav First League: 1983–84

Salamanca

- Segunda División: 1996–97

Yugoslavia

- Mediterranean Games: 1979
- Summer Olympics Bronze Medal: 1984

=== Manager ===
Lokomotiva

- 1. HNL runner-up: 2012–13
- Croatian Cup runner-up: 2012–13
- Football Oscar Best Prva HNL manager: 2013
