= Džemal Mustedanagić =

Bosnian footballer (born 1955)

Personal information
- Date of birth: 8 June 1955 (age 71)
- Place of birth: Bosanski Novi, PR Bosnia and Herzegovina, FPR Yugoslavia
- Position: Defender

Team information
- Current team: Albania U16 (manager)

Youth career
- 1968–1973: Sloboda Bosanski Novi

Senior career*
Years	Team	Apps	(Gls)
1973–1983	Dinamo Zagreb	444	(37)
1983–1986	Austria Wien	74	(3)
Total		608	(52)

International career
1980	Yugoslavia	1	(0)

Managerial career
- 1987–2003: Dinamo Zagreb Football School
- 2003–2005: Dinamo Zagreb Reserve Team
- 2003–2005: Croatia U19
- 2005–2006: Dinamo Zagreb (assistant)
- 2007–2008: Dinamo Zagreb U19
- 2009–2010: Albania (assistant)
- 2011: Albania
- 2011–2019: Albania U17
- 2017–: Albania U16
- * Club domestic league appearances and goals

Džemal Mustedanagić (born 8 June 1955) is a Bosnian-Herzegovinian retired footballer and current manager of the Albania national under-16 football team.

== Playing career ==
=== Club ===
Born in Bosanski Novi, his playing career started in FK Sloboda Bosanski Novi where he played from 1968 till 1973 when he was approached by several Yugoslavian first league clubs. He chose Dinamo Zagreb where he played from 1973 till 1983 and had 444 caps, winning the 1981–82 Yugoslav First League title and the 1979–80 Yugoslav Cup title. Also he was first team captain during Miroslav Blažević's managing. He moved to FK Austria Wien in 1983. During that time they won 3 national titles, a national cup, and a famous club achievement – beating FC Barcelona.

=== International ===
He made his debut for Yugoslavia in a September 1980 World Cup qualification match against Denmark, coming on as a second half substitute for Ivan Buljan. It remained his sole international appearance.

== Managerial career ==
After his player career in 1987, on demand of the management board of Dinamo Zagreb, he started working with youngsters as a coach in Dinamo Zagreb Football school. In season 2003-04 he coached the reserve squad of Dinamo Zagreb, where he trained and developed top youngsters' talents such as Eduardo, Luka Modrić, Niko Kranjčar, Vedran Ćorluka, Dino Drpić, Tomo Šokota, Mihael Mikić, Hrvoje Čale and Filip Lončarić. Also, during that period, considering talents he brought up to national team, he was selected to work with the expert committee of the Croatia national team, as coach of the U-19 national team.

This generation reached the first team, and in 2005 and 2006 Džemal Mustedanagić became coach with Josip Kuže of Dinamo Zagreb's first-team. Under their management, Dinamo rose from 7th place to winning first place. This squad included players who were called up to the national team.

=== Albania national team ===
In 2009, he arrived in Albania and the Albanian Football Association appointed him as assistant coach of Josip Kuže at the Albania national football team. After Kuže's medical problems, Džemal was appointed as a caretaker coach of the Albania national football team in October 2010. Then following the departure of Kuže after the end of the UEFA Euro 2012 qualifying, Mustedanagić was a temporary coach of Albania for two friendly matches in November 2011 against Azerbaijan on 11 November and Macedonia on 15 November.

In 2011, he took charge of the Albania national under-17 football team and in his debut he qualified the team to the next round of 2012 UEFA European Under-17 Championship, the Elite round.

In November 2017 he was charged to run at the same time the Albania national under-16 team. He participated in the 2017 Mercedez Benz Aegean Cup International Youth Tournament in Turkey, recording a 0–1 loss in the first match against Azerbaijan U16 on 20 November, a 0–0 draw in the second match against hosts Turkey U16 on 21 November and a 2–1 loss in the last match against Kosovo U16 on 23 November.
