= Marijan Vlak =

Croatian footballer and manager

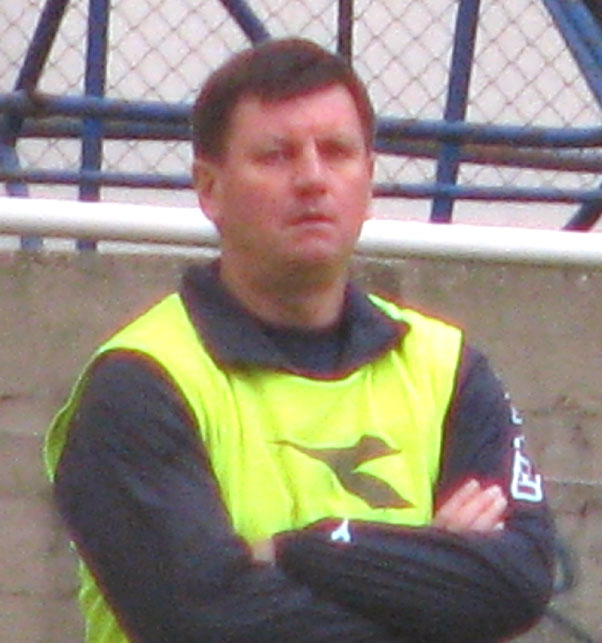

Personal information
- Full name: Marijan Vlak
- Date of birth: 23 October 1955 (age 71)
- Place of birth: Petrinja, Croatia
- Position: Goalkeeper

Youth career
- Maksimir

Senior career*
Years	Team	Apps	(Gls)
1974-1988	Dinamo Zagreb		
1988	Segesta Sisak		

Managerial career
- 1997–1998: Dinamo Zagreb
- 1998: Slaven Belupo
- 1999: Ferencváros
- 1999–2000: Dinamo Zagreb
- 2002: Dinamo Zagreb
- 2006: Žilina
- 2006–2007: Fehérvár
- 2008–2009: Dinamo Zagreb
- 2011–2012: Vasas Budapest
- 2012: Vasas Budapest
- * Club domestic league appearances and goals

Marijan Vlak (born 23 October 1955) is a Croatian retired football goalkeeper and manager.

== Playing career ==
Born in Petrinja, he spent his playing career as a goalkeeper for Dinamo Zagreb and Segesta Sisak. Although he was never capped for the Yugoslavia national football team, he was on Miljan Miljanić's broader list for the 1982 FIFA World Cup but failed to make the final cut.

He won the 1981–82 Yugoslav First League title with Dinamo after beating closest rivals Red Star Belgrade 3–0.

== Managerial career ==
Vlak started his managerial career in 1990 and he managed Dinamo on several occasions, leaving them in March 2009 for the last time.

He took charge of Hungarian side Vasas Budapest in August 2011. He was released by the club in February 2012 citing they could not afford to pay him anymore. He also managed Hungarian sides Ferencváros and Videoton.

== Honours ==
=== Club ===
==== Dinamo Zagreb ====
- First Federal League: 1981–82
- Marshal Tito Cup: 1982–83
