= Milivoj Bračun =

Croatian footballer and manager

Personal information
- Date of birth: 22 April 1958 (age 68)
- Place of birth: Zagreb, PR Croatia, FPR Yugoslavia
- Height: 1.83 m (6 ft 0 in)
- Position: Defender

Youth career
- 1974–1980: Dinamo Zagreb

Senior career*
Years	Team	Apps	(Gls)
1980–1986	Dinamo Zagreb	94	(4)
1986–1987	Red Star Belgrade	26	(0)
1987–1989	Elche	67	(13)
Total		187	(17)

Managerial career
- Dinamo Zagreb (youth)
- 1994: Istra
- 1994–1995: Segesta
- 1996–1997: Istra
- 2000: Hrvatski Dragovoljac
- 2002–2003: Koper
- 2004: NK Zagreb
- 2004–2005: Olimpija Ljubljana
- 2005–2006: Pula 1856
- 2006: Koper
- 2006–2007: Rijeka
- 2007–2008: Inter Zaprešić
- 2009: Slaven Belupo
- 2011–2012: Koper
- * Club domestic league appearances and goals

Milivoj Bračun (born 22 April 1958) is a Croatian football manager and former player who was most recently the manager of Slovenian First League side FC Koper.

Born in Zagreb, SR Croatia, back then within Yugoslavia, Bračun played for Dinamo Zagreb, Red Star Belgrade and Elche CF.

== Club career ==
In the summer of 1986, after six seasons with Dinamo Zagreb, Bračun's contract at Maksimir expired. Since he wasn't offered a new one by head coach Ćiro Blažević, the 28-year-old defender principally agreed his transfer to Hajduk Split. However, later on in the summer transfer window veteran defender Luka Peruzović came back to the club, making Bračun's potential move surplus to requirements. Instead, Bračun accepted an offer from Red Star's sporting director Dragan Džajić and moved to Belgrade.

== Coaching ==
Bračun has managed the youth team of GNK Dinamo Zagreb and the senior teams of NK Istra Pula, NK Segesta Sisak, NK Hrvatski Dragovoljac, NK Pula SČ, FC Koper, NK Olimpija Ljubljana, NK Zagreb, NK Rijeka and NK Inter Zaprešić.
