= Dragan Bošnjak =

Yugoslav and Serbian footballer (1956–2019)

Personal information
- Full name: Dragan Bošnjak
- Date of birth: 19 October 1956
- Place of birth: Kanjiža, PR Serbia, FPR Yugoslavia
- Date of death: 27 March 2019 (aged 62)
- Place of death: Kanjiža, Serbia
- Height: 1.78 m (5 ft 10 in)
- Position: Midfielder

Senior career*
| Years | Team | Apps | (Gls) |
| 1975–1976 | Spartak Subotica | 21 | (2) |
| 1976–1979 | Vojvodina | 92 | (9) |
| 1980–1984 | Dinamo Zagreb | 101 | (4) |
| 1985 | Dinamo Vinkovci | 5 | (0) |
| 1985–1987 | Gaziantepspor | 34 | (0) |
| 1987 | Figueres | 0 | (0) |
| 1988 | Spartak Subotica | | |
| 1988–1989 | Westerlo | | |
| Total | | 253+ | (15+) |

International career
| 1978 | Yugoslavia U21 | 5 | (0) |
Medal record
| Gold medal – first place | UEFA Under-21 Championship | 1978 |
- * Club domestic league appearances and goals

Dragan Bošnjak (Serbian Cyrillic: Драган Бошњак; 19 October 1956 – 27 March 2019) was a Yugoslav and Serbian professional footballer who played as a midfielder.

== Club career ==
After starting out at Spartak Subotica, Bošnjak joined Vojvodina in 1976. He spent three and a half years with the club and won the Mitropa Cup in the 1976–77 season. In the winter of 1980, Bošnjak switched to Dinamo Zagreb. He helped them win the Yugoslav First League in the 1981–82 season, as well as two Yugoslav Cups, in 1980 and 1983. In 1985, Bošnjak spent half a year at Dinamo Vinkovci.

Later on, Bošnjak played professionally in Turkey (Gaziantepspor), Spain (Figueres), and Belgium (Westerlo).

== International career ==
At international level, Bošnjak was a member of the Yugoslavia under-21 team that won the UEFA European Under-21 Championship in 1978.

== Death ==
Bošnjak died in his hometown of Kanjiža on 27 March 2019.

== Honours ==
Vojvodina

- Mitropa Cup: 1976–77

Dinamo Zagreb

- Yugoslav First League: 1981–82
- Yugoslav Cup: 1979–80, 1982–83

Yugoslavia U21

- UEFA European Under-21 Championship: 1978
