= Ismet Hadžić =

Yugoslav footballer (1954–2015)

Personal information
- Date of birth: 7 July 1954
- Place of birth: Tuzla, FPR Yugoslavia
- Date of death: 14 July 2015 (aged 61)
- Place of death: Zagreb, Croatia
- Position: Defender

Youth career
- –1972: Sloboda Tuzla

Senior career*
Years	Team	Apps	(Gls)
1972–1979	Sloboda Tuzla	164	(5)
1980–1986	Dinamo Zagreb	115	(0)
1986–1987	Prishtina	2	(0)
Total		281	(5)

International career
1979–1983	Yugoslavia	5	(0)

Managerial career
- Dinamo Zagreb Academy
Medal record
Men's Football
Representing Yugoslavia
Mediterranean Games
Gold medal – first place	1979 Split	Team
- * Club domestic league appearances and goals

Ismet Hadžić "Hadžija" (7 July 1954 – 14 July 2015) was a Bosnian-Herzegovinian professional footballer who played as a defender for FK Sloboda Tuzla, GNK Dinamo Zagreb, FC Prishtina and the Yugoslavia national team. He was also a coach in the GNK Dinamo Zagreb Academy.

== Club career ==
He was part of the Dinamo Zagreb squad that won the 1981–82 Yugoslav First League and the 1982–83 Yugoslav Cup.

== International career ==
He made his debut for Yugoslavia in an April 1979 European Championship qualification match away against Cyprus and has earned a total of 5 caps, scoring no goals. His final international was an April 1983 friendly match against France.

== Death ==
Hadžić died at the age of 61 on 14 July 2015 in Zagreb, Croatia. He was buried in his hometown of Tuzla, Bosnia and Herzegovina on 16 July 2015.

== Honours ==
=== Player ===
Dinamo Zagreb

- Yugoslav First League: 1981–82
- Yugoslav Cup: 1982–83

Yugoslavia

- Mediterranean Games: 1979
