= Milan Ćalasan =

Slovenian footballer (born 1954)

Personal information
- Date of birth: 29 October 1954 (age 72)
- Place of birth: Maribor, FPR Yugoslavia
- Height: 1.85 m (6 ft 1 in)
- Position: Forward

Senior career*
Years	Team	Apps	(Gls)
1973–1974	Maribor		
1974–1975	Budućnost Titograd		
1975–1977	Red Star Belgrade	3	(0)
1977–1979	Olimpija Ljubljana	60	(16)
1979–1982	Dinamo Zagreb	27	(5)
1982–1983	Liège	16	(5)
1983–1984	Rot-Weiss Essen	11	(1)
1984–1985	Béziers	33	(20)
1985–1987	Orléans	64	(38)
1987–1988	Guingamp	30	(17)
1988–1989	Guegnon		
- * Club domestic league appearances and goals

Milan Ćalasan (born 29 October 1954) is a Slovenian former professional footballer who played as a forward. He works as a sports agent.

== Career ==
Ćalasan played for Red Star Belgrade, Olimpija Ljubljana and Dinamo Zagreb in the 1970s and 1980s before moving abroad and spending several seasons with Liège in Belgium and Rot-Weiss Essen in Germany.

After retiring from football, Ćalasan became a sports agent.

From 1990 to 2001 he was the sports director of two Japanese football clubs, Nagoya Grampus Eight and Gamba Osaka. He was the first agent who brought European players and coaches such as Arsène Wenger and Frederic Antonetti in Japan.

== Other activities ==
In May 2010, Ćalasan was mentioned in the Serbian media in connection to the controversial 2005 satellite rental contract in which another one of his companies, Virgin Islands-based Camira Creek Corporation, acted as middleman between the Serbia and Montenegro state union and Israeli company Image Sat International. Ćalasan had reportedly been involved in the negotiations between the two parties since the fall of 2004 at which time Serbia and Montenegro was represented by its defense minister Prvoslav Davinić and president Svetozar Marović.

Davinić eventually signed off on the contract for the rental services of the EROS satellite for €45 million. According to allegations, the deal had not been authorized by the Serbian state authorities and the entire affair came under investigation conducted by the Serbian justice and defence ministries.
