= List of Red Star Belgrade footballers =

This is a list of all the football players that have played for Red Star Belgrade (FK Crvena zvezda) since its foundation in 1945.

There are included the players that have played at least one match in any of the following competitions: the domestic league, domestic cup and European competitions.

The players, which played only in unofficial games or were on a trial, are not included.

As of 22 August 2025.

== A ==
- (Slovenia) Milenko Ačimovič 139/46 (1998–2002)
- (Serbia) Đorđe Aćimović 2/0 (1989–90, 1991–92)
- (Serbia) Jovan Aćimović 318/56 (1965–76)
- (Serbia) Goran Adamović 1/0 (2006–08)
- (Brazil) Adilson 16/0 (1998–99)
- (Ghana) Lee Addy 37/0 (2010–11)
- (Serbia) Ivan Adžić 143/14 (1989–96)
- (Serbia) Luka Adžić 39/9 (2016–18)
- (Brazil) Aílton 15/4 (2006–07)
- (Serbia) Duško Ajder 1/0 (1976–79)
- (Serbia) Veljko Aleksić 14/2 (1966–67)
- (Serbia) Stevan Andrejević 3/1 (1975)
- (Serbia) Svetozar Andrejić 44/4 (1961–66)
- (Montenegro) Dušan Andrić 15/1 (1964)
- (Serbia) Dušan Anđelković 141/6 (2005–08, 2015–18)
- (Serbia) Jovan Anđelković 22/3 (1962–63)
- (Serbia) Darko Anić 29/5 (1996–97)
- (Ghana) Ebenezer Annan 20/1 (2024–25)
- (Serbia) Nikola Antić 2/0 (2014)
- (Serbia) Sava Antić 12/4 (1948–50)
- (Serbia) Zoran Antonijević 242/33 (1967–75)
- (Serbia) Aleksandar Aranđelović 6/2 (1946–47)
- (Montenegro) Jovo Aranitović 2/0 (1996–97)
- (Peru) Miguel Araujo 6/0 (2013–14)
- (Austria) Marko Arnautović 2/0 (2025–)
- (Slovenia) Milan Arnejčič 15/3 (1969–70)
- (Ghana) Nathaniel Asamoah 15/1 (2012–13)
- (Serbia) Branislav Atanacković 1 (1972–77)
- (Bulgaria) Todor Atanaskov (Svetozar "Toza" Atanacković) 10/3 (1946–48)
- (Serbia) Adem Avdić 2/0 (2025–)
- (North Macedonia) Daniel Avramovski 13/1 (2014–16)
- (Georgia (country)) Irakli Azarovi 26/0 (2022–23)

== B ==
- (Australia) Eli Babalj 8/1 (2012–13)
- (Gabon) Shavy Babicka (2025–)
- (Serbia) Dragoš Babić 1/0 (1963)
- (Serbia) Milan Babić 23/0 (1975–79)
- (Serbia) Srđan Babić 82/7 (2017–21)
- (North Macedonia) David Babunski 13/0 (2016)
- (Serbia) Filip Bainović 2/0 (2017–18)
- (Serbia) Miloš Bajalica 24/0 (2007)
- (Serbia) Srđan Bajčetić 92/5 (1995, 1998–2001)
- (Montenegro) Boban Bajković 119 (2004, 2008–14)
- (The Gambia) Mahmudu Bajo 2/0 (2025–)
- (France) (Ivory Coast) Axel Bakayoko 8/0 (2000–22)
- (Montenegro) Božidar Bandović 35/3 (1992–95)
- (Montenegro) Nebojša Bandović 4/0 (1983–85)
- (Serbia) Zoran Banković 35/3 (1983–85)
- (Montenegro) Zoran Banović 19 (2004–08)
- (Serbia) Petar Baralić 134/12 (1973–79)
- (Argentina) Hernán Barcos 17/3 (2007–08)
- (Serbia) Dušan Basta 141/8 (2002–2008)
- (Croatia) Vladimir Beara 110 (1955–60)
- (Serbia) Dejan Bekić 90/3 (1963–67)
- (Serbia) Jovan Beleslin 1/0 (1947–48)
- (Serbia) Nikola Beljić 5/0 (2003–05)
- (Romania) Miodrag Belodedici 108/3 (1989–92)
- (Comoros) El Fardou Ben 196/83 (2018–23)
- (Bosnia and Herzegovina) Enes Bešić 30/2 (1988–90)
- (Chad) Misdongard Betoligar 16/4 (2007–08)
- (Serbia) Zoran Bingulac 5/0 (1973)
- (Serbia) Dragiša Binić 80/35 (1987–88, 1990–91)
- (Serbia) Milan Biševac 83/3 (2004–06)
- (Serbia) Nikoslav Bjegović 79/0 (1997–2000)
- (Bosnia and Herzegovina) Cvijetin Blagojević 141/12 (1978–83)
- (Serbia) Đorđe Blašćuk 1/2 (1952)
- (Serbia) Marko Blažić 43/5 (2008–10)
- (Ghana) Richmond Boakye 104/60 (2017, 2019–2020)
- (Montenegro) Dragan Bogavac 85/14 (2002–05)
- (Serbia) Igor Bogdanović 20/7 (2002–03)
- (Serbia) Vladimir Bogdanović 76/6 (2008–10)
- (Bosnia and Herzegovina) Jadranko Bogičević 5/0 (2003–05)
- (Serbia) Vladislav Bogićević 237/22 (1968–77)
- (Serbia) Milan Bogunović 1/0 (2003–05)
- (Bosnia and Herzegovina) Elvir Bolić 18/2 (1991–92)
- (Colombia) Cristian Borja 54/17 (2011–12)
- (Canada) Milan Borjan 275/1(198)/134 c.s (2017–24)
- (Serbia) Zdravko Borovnica 161/24 (1976–82)
- (Bosnia and Herzegovina) Ranko Borozan 40/3 (1957–59)
- (Serbia) Miloš Bosančić 20/0 (2014)
- (Montenegro) Branko Bošković 157/39 (1998–2003)
- (Serbia) Goran Bošković 56/0 (1996–99)
- (Montenegro) Miodrag Božović 63/1 (1992–94)
- (Croatia) Milivoj Bračun 35/0 (1986–87)
- (Serbia) Miloš Brajović 1/0 (2013–14)
- (Bosnia and Herzegovina) Aleksandar Bratić 11/0 (1996–97)
- (Serbia) Vidak Bratić 40/1 (2001–03)
- (Poland) Grzegorz Bronowicki 22/0 (2007–08)
- (Ghana) Osman Bukari 78/25 (2022–24)
- (Montenegro) Radosav Bulić 4/0 (2001–02)
- (Serbia) Goran Bunjevčević 169/19 (1997–2001)
- (Serbia) Borisav Burmaz 1/0 (2019)
- (Serbia) Miloš Bursać 37/11 (1988–89)
- (Montenegro) Igor Burzanović 62/14 (2007–09)
- (Croatia) Ladislav Butković 3/0 (1953)

== C ==
- (Brazil) Cadú 104/26 (2009–13)
- (Brazil) Jonathan Cafú 9/2 (2018–19)
- (Spain) José Cañas 21/1(2019–20)
- (Ecuador) Segundo Castillo 66/17 (2006–08)
- (Serbia) Dragoljub Cicak 1/0 (1945–51)
- (Brazil) Cléo 24/12 (2008–09)
- (Serbia) Jovan Cokić 97/30 (1948–49, 1953–58)
- (Mali) Kalifa Coulibaly 7/1 (2022–23)
- (Croatia) Borislav Cvetković 86/35 (1986–88)
- (Serbia) Draško Cvetković 1/0 (1978–79)
- (Serbia) Ljubomir Cvetković 13/0 (1975–76)
- (Serbia) Miloš Cvetković 33/1 (2015–16)
- (Serbia) Nemanja Cvetković 7/0 (2009–10)

== Č ==
- (Croatia) Zdravko Čakalić 8/0 (1978–83)
- (Serbia) Goran Čaušić 28/1 (2018–19)
- (Serbia) Zvezdan Čebinac 18/3 (1964–65)
- (Croatia) Milan Čop 137/5 (1962–67)
- (Serbia) Slaviša Čula 16/2 (1990–92)

== Ć ==
- (Slovenia) Milan Ćalasan 4/0 (1975–77)
- (Serbia) Milovan Ćirić 11/4 (1945–46)
- (Serbia) Petar Ćosić 19 (1959–64)
- (Serbia) Uroš Ćosić 21/1 (2011–12)
- (Serbia) Milanko Ćuk 6/0 (1961–62)

== D ==
- (North Macedonia) Slavko Dacevski 1/0 (1955–56)
- (Serbia) Mirko Dakić 21/0 (1966–68)
- (Guinea-Bissau) Dálcio 21/0 (2024–25)
- (Serbia) Aleksa Damjanović 2/0 (2025–)
- (Nigeria) Abiola Dauda 38/17 (2013–14)
- (Serbia) Branko Davidović 61 (1985–89)
- (Australia) Miloš Degenek 142/3 (2018, 2019–22, 2023–24)
- (Serbia) Vukašin Dević 2/0 (2008)
- (Serbia) Đorđe Despotović 12/2 (2014–15)
- (Serbia) Dragomir Diklić 1/0 (1946–48)
- (Serbia) Dejan Dimitrijević 23/1 (1992–94)
- (Serbia) Miloš Dimitrijević 55/4 (2011–13)
- (Serbia) Vladimir Dimitrijević 1/0 (2001)
- (Serbia) Zoran Dimitrijević 60/2 (1982–87, 1988–89)
- (France) Loïs Diony 17/3 (2021–22)
- (Serbia) Milorad Diskić 61 (1951–53)
- (Serbia) Vladimir Dišljenković 81 (2001–04)
- (Burkina Faso) Nasser Djiga 56/4 (2023–25)
- (North Macedonia) Kiril Dojčinovski 252/5 (1967–74)
- (Suriname) Mitchell Donald 107/15 (2015–18)
- (Montenegro) Žarko Dragaš 9/2 (1995–96)
- (Austria) Aleksandar Dragović 136/7 (2021–24)
- (Serbia) Milenko Drakulić 45/0 (1945–48)
- (Ghana) Haminu Draman 7/1 (2005–06)
- (Bosnia and Herzegovina) Miroljub Dramićanin 2/0 (1974–75)
- (Serbia) Božidar Drenovac 44/4 (1945–48)
- (Serbia) Miloš Drizić 19/2 (1980, 1989–90)
- (Slovenia) Vanja Drkušić 12/1 (2024–25)
- (Montenegro) Anto Drobnjak 75/43 (1992–94)
- (Serbia) Goran Drulić 92/43 (1995–96, 1997–2001)
- (Brazil) Bruno Duarte 52/26 (2024–)
- (Serbia) Ivan Dudić 16/3 (2002–04)
- (Serbia) Ivan Dudić 88/1 (1995–97, 1998–2000)
- (Serbia) Milan Dudić 142/14 (2002–06)
- (Serbia) Ratomir Dujković 266 (1963–74)
- (Serbia) Darko Dunjić 2/0 (2002–03)
- (Serbia) Vladimir Durković 220/7 (1955–66)
- (Serbia) Mihajlo Dušanović 1/0 (1957–59)

== Dž ==
- (Serbia) Dragan Džajić 389/155 (1963–75,77–78)

== Đ / Dj ==
- (Bosnia and Herzegovina) Predrag Đajić 202/24 (1945–55)
- (Serbia) Petar Đenić 6/0 (2000–02)
- (Montenegro) Ardijan Đokaj 29/5 (2005–06)
- (Serbia) Dušan Đokić 48/24 (2006–07)
- (Serbia) Bratislav Đorđević 37/0 (1973–77)
- (Serbia) Filip Đorđević 15/0 (2005–08)
- (Serbia) Predrag Đorđević 6/0 (1991–93)
- (Serbia) Slavoljub Đorđević 106/0 (2003–05, 2009–11)
- (Serbia) Stefan Đorđević 3/0 (2014–15)
- (Serbia) Velimir Đorđević 1/0 (1958)
- (Serbia) Vladimir Đorđević 8/0 (2007–08)
- (Serbia) Vojislav Đorđević 3/0 (1946–48)
- (Sweden) Bojan Djordjic 25/1 (2003–04)
- (Bosnia and Herzegovina) Ranko Đorđić 82/16 (1981–85)
- (Serbia) Milovan Đorić 176/9 (1967–73)
- (Serbia) Goran Đorović 136/3 (1993–97)
- (Serbia) Zoran Đorović 7/0 (1993–97)
- (Bosnia and Herzegovina) Goran Đukić 5/0 (2001–02)
- (Serbia) Milivoje Đurđević 75/0 (1945–52)
- (Serbia) Sreten Đurica 22/2 (1963)
- (Serbia) Petar Đuričković 2/0 (2012–14)
- (Montenegro) Andrej Đurić 18/0 (2021–22, 2024–25)
- (Serbia) Konstantin Đurić 15/1 (1982–85)
- (Serbia) Špiro Đurić 3 (1958)
- (Serbia) Žarko Đurović 182/24 (1981–84, 1985–89)
- (North Macedonia) Boško Đurovski 299/59 (1978–89)
- (North Macedonia) Milko Đurovski 146/65 (1979–86)

== E ==
- (Netherlands) Lorenzo Ebecilio 30/3 (2018–19)
- (Brazil) Edgar 10/2 (2008)
- (Brazil) Edson Silva 7/0 (2016)
- (Slovenia) Marko Elsner 165/4 (1983–87)
- (Slovenia) Timi Max Elšnik 51/6 (2024–)
- (Serbia) Strahinja Eraković 107/0 (2019–23)
- (Brazil) Evandro Goebel 49/16 (2011–12)

== F ==
- (Italy) Diego Falcinelli 37/13 (2020–21)
- (Italy) Filippo Falco 36/6 (2021–22)
- (Brazil) Josiesley Ferreira 4/0 (2009)
- (Montenegro) Zoran Filipović 263/138 (1969–80)
- (Ghana) Abraham Frimpong 33/1 (2017–18)

== G ==
- (Serbia) Jovan Gajić 10 (1955–58)
- (Serbia) Milan Gajić 120/6 (2019–22)
- (Argentina) Mateo García 24/5 (2019–20)
- (Honduras) Luis Garrido 10/0 (2013)
- (North Macedonia) Matej Gashtarov 1/0 (2025)
- (Serbia) Nenad Gavrić 25/2 (2014–16)
- (Serbia) Željko Gavrić 44/9 (2018–21)
- (Bulgaria) Blagoy Georgiev 27/2 (2006–08)
- (North Macedonia) Blaže Georgioski 43/6 (1999–2000)
- (Israel) Omri Glazer 64 (2023–)
- (Bosnia and Herzegovina) Stevo Glogovac 78/3 (1999–2002)
- (Serbia) Marko Gobeljić 188/11(2017–23)
- (Serbia) Goran Gogić 30/1 (2013–14)
- (Serbia) Jovan Gojković 102/31 (1997–2000)
- (North Macedonia) Slobodan Goračinov 7/1 (1980–84)
- (Serbia) Miloš Gordić 3 (2020–24)
- (Serbia) Marko Grujić 41/6 (2012–16)
- (Bosnia and Herzegovina) Vladan Grujić 3/0 (2002)
- (Senegal) Ibrahima Gueye 77/1 (2006–08)
- (Serbia) Ivan Guteša 19 (2024–)
- (Serbia) Ivan Gvozdenović 169/16 (1999–2003)

== H ==
- (Serbia) Stefan Hajdin 10/0 (2018–19, 2020)
- (Bosnia and Herzegovina) Sulejman Halilović 38/24 (1984–85)
- (Serbia) Đura Horvatinović 4/1 (1945–47)
- (North Macedonia) Dragan Hristovski 3/0 (1974)
- (South Korea) Hwang In-beom 42/6 (2023–24)

== I ==
- (Argentina) Luis Ibáñez 37/11 (2015–16)
- (Serbia) Nikola Ignjatijević 38/2 (2009–11)
- (Serbia) Aleksandar Ilić 1/0 (1990)
- (Serbia) Dejan Ilić 176/11 (1997–2002, 2003)
- (Serbia) Ivan Ilić 1/0 (2017–19)
- (Serbia) Luka Ilić 62/16(2017–18, 2024–25)
- (Serbia) Marko Ilić 15 (2024)
- (Serbia) Mihajlo Ilić 2/0 (1945)
- (Serbia) Momčilo Ilić 4/0 (1957–58)
- (Serbia) Stefan Ilić 1/0 (2016–17)
- (Ghana) Mohammed-Awal Issah 76/2 (2009–11)
- (Montenegro) Mirko Ivanić 264/83 (2019–)
- (Australia) Milan Ivanović 35/0 (1985–86, 1988)
- (Serbia) Ilija Ivić 109/50 (1991–94)
- (Serbia) Svetislav Ivković 1/0 (1948–49)
- (Croatia) Tomislav Ivković 58 (1983–85)

== J ==
- (Canada) Dejan Jakovic 4/0 (2008–09)
- (Serbia) Nemanja Jakšić 1/0 (2013–14)
- (Brazil) Jander 15/1 (2019–20)
- (North Macedonia) Igor Jančevski 1 (92–93)
- (Serbia) Boško Janković 101/27 (2002–06)
- (Serbia) Filip Janković 3/0 (2011–13)
- (Serbia) Milan Janković 198/24 (1980–87)
- (Serbia) Slavoljub Janković 6/0 (1989–90)
- (Serbia) Slobodan Janković 113/28 (1968–69, 1970–75)
- (Croatia) Rajko Janjanin 143/33 (1980–84)
- (Serbia) Branko Jelić 82/26 (2000–03)
- (Serbia) Zoran Jelikić 163/8 (1974–81)
- (Serbia) Milan Jeremić 6/0 (2010–11)
- (Serbia) Nenad Jestrović 28/15 (2007–08)
- (Montenegro) Dragoslav Jevrić 95 (1995–99)
- (Serbia) Aleksandar Jevtić 62/15 (2009–11)
- (Serbia) Živorad Jevtić 201/5 (1962–75)
- (Serbia) Milan Jevtović 24/6 (2018–20)
- (Serbia) Jovan Jezerkić 84/53 (1945–47, 1948–52)
- (Slovakia) Erik Jirka 7/0 (2019)
- (Serbia) Dejan Joksimović 28/3 (1987–88, 1990–91)
- (Serbia) Nebojša Joksimović 43/1 (2004–07)
- (Serbia) Dušan Jovančić 69/3 (2018–20)
- (Serbia) Lazar Jovanović 5/1 (2024–25)
- (Montenegro) Milan Jovanović 15/1 (2012–13)
- (Serbia) Milić Jovanović 8 (1990–91)
- (Serbia) Miodrag Mija Jovanović 1/0 (1947–48)
- (Montenegro) Nikola Jovanović 179/11 (1975–80)
- (Serbia) Predrag Jovanović 6/0 (1991–92)
- (Serbia) Vukašin Jovanović 35/2 (2014–16)
- (North Macedonia) Đorđe Jovanovski 1/0 (1977–78)
- (Serbia) Dejan Joveljić 28/14 (2016–19)
- (Serbia) Branko Jovičić 77/3(2017–20)
- (Serbia) Zoran Jovičić 90/51 (1991–93, 1995–98)
- (Serbia) Luka Jović 48/13 (2014–16)
- (Serbia) Milan Jovin 174/7 (1978–86)
- (Montenegro) Vladimir Jovović 1/0 (2015–16)
- (Serbia) Vladimir Jugović 100/16 (1989–92)
- (Croatia) Goran Jurić 111/0 (1987–91)
- (Serbia) Ivan Jurišić 163/2 (1978–84)

== K ==
- (Serbia) Damir Kahriman 58 (2014–18)
- (Serbia) Boško Kajganić 55 (1967–77)
- (Serbia) Andrija Kaluđerović 55/30 (2010–12)
- (Montenegro) Željko Kaluđerović 1 (1987–91)
- (North Macedonia) Dragan Kanatlarovski 40/13 (1989–90)
- (Gabon) Guélor Kanga 263/51 (2016–18, 2020–25)
- (Zambia) Kings Kangwa 56/12 (2022–24)
- (Serbia) Nikola Karaklajić 1/0 (2013–14)
- (Serbia) Sava Karapandžić 73/0 (1964–71)
- (Serbia) Stanislav Karasi 197/71 (1968–74)
- (Montenegro) Filip Kasalica 76/13 (2012–14)
- (Croatia) Mladen Kašanin 65/0 (1945–50)
- (Serbia) Aleksandar Katai 275/138 (2014–16, 2020–)
- (Slovenia) Dejan Kelhar 15/0 (2014)
- (Serbia) Mihalj Keri 263/7 (1968–78)
- (Serbia) Aleksandar Kirovski 7 (2011–13)
- (Serbia) Branko Klenkovski 204/15 (1965–74)
- (Serbia) Aleksandar Kocić 101 (1998–2001)
- (Serbia) Saša Kocić 7/0 (2001–02)
- (Serbia) Dragić Komadina 44/1 (1982–84, 1987–89)
- (Serbia) Marko Konatar 1/0 (2020)
- (Serbia) Ognjen Koroman 73/13 (2007–09)
- (Serbia) Bora Kostić 341/230 (1951–61, 1962–66)
- (Serbia) Vasilije Kostov 8/1 (2025–)
- (Serbia) Aleksandar Kovačević 55/0 (2008, 2013–15)
- (Serbia) Darko Kovačević 62/45 (1994–96)
- (Serbia) Nenad Kovačević 135/1 (2002–06, 2011)
- (Serbia) Stevan Kovačević 1/1 (1966–68)
- (Ivory Coast) Jean-Philippe Krasso 36/9 (2023–24)
- (Serbia) Zlatko Krdžević 110/3 (1984–89)
- (Serbia) Aleksandar Kristić 84/1 (1991–94, 1997–98)
- (Montenegro) Miodrag Krivokapić 122/1 (1983–88)
- (Serbia) Radovan Krivokapić 119/14 (2002–06)
- (Serbia) Petar Krivokuća 191/13 (1968–76)
- (Serbia) Srboljub Krivokuća 124 (1952–57)
- (Serbia) Zlatko Krmpotić 229/8 (1977–86)
- (Serbia) Jovan Krneta 29/1 (2011–14)
- (North Macedonia) Darko Krsteski 13/0 (1997–99)
- (Serbia) Nenad Krstičić 112/8 (2017–19, 2021–23)
- (Serbia) Milan Krstić 13/1 (1945–47)
- (Montenegro) Nikola Krstović 27/3 (2019–22)
- (Bosnia and Herzegovina) Rade Krunić 40/8 (2024–)
- (Serbia) Nebojša Krupniković 92/55 (1991–93, 1994–96)
- (Serbia) Lajčo Kujundžić 7/1 (1949–51)

== L ==
- (Serbia) Dragan Lacmanović 2/0 (1983)
- (Serbia) Nenad Lalatović 118/5 (1997, 1999–2002)
- (Montenegro) Vojin Lazarević 214/134 (1966–70, 1972–74)
- (Serbia) Marko Lazetić 1/0 (2020)
- (Serbia) Nikola Lazetić 74/3 (1995–97, 2008–10)
- (Serbia) Darko Lazić 37/1 (2013–15)
- (Serbia) Miroslav Lazić 4/0 (1953–55)
- (Serbia) Darko Lazović 142/34 (2009–15)
- (France) Damien Le Tallec 104/7 (2016–18)
- (Serbia) Miroslav Lečić 1/0 (2004)
- (Serbia) Dejan Lekić 37/16 (2009–10)
- (Montenegro) Dragoje Leković 27 (1991–92)
- (Serbia) Stefan Leković 26/2 (2023–)
- (Serbia) Leo Lerinc 112/12 (1999–2002)
- (Serbia) Milan Lešnjak 6/0 (1993–94)
- (Serbia) Darko Ljubojević 45/7 (1995–97)
- (Serbia) Živan Ljukovčan 126 (1977–81, 1984–86)
- (Serbia) Ljubomir Lovrić 100 (1945–52)
- (Portugal) João Lucas 23/1 (2007–08)
- (Serbia) Vladimir Lučić 38/3 (2023–)
- (Bosnia and Herzegovina) Dušan Lukić 74/3 (1976–79)
- (Serbia) Vladan Lukić 96/41 (1986–92)
- (Serbia) Aleksandar Luković 148/12 (2002–06, 2015–17)
- (Serbia) Andrija Luković 7/0 (2016–17)

== M ==
- (Serbia) Andrija Maksimović 41/6 (2023–25)
- (Serbia) Nebojša Maksimović 16/1 (1993–94)
- (Serbia) Nikola Maksimović 35/1 (2012–13)
- (Serbia) Luka Malešev 51/6 (1961–63)
- (Bosnia and Herzegovina) Zoran Mališević 15/1 (1981–82)
- (Serbia) Danilo Mandić 1/0 (1976–77)
- (Serbia) Filip Manojlović 33 (2016–17)
- (Serbia) Dušan Maravić 112/33 (1958–64)
- (Germany) Marko Marin 58/11 (2018–20)
- (Serbia) Srboljub Marinković 2/0 (1979–81)
- (Bosnia and Herzegovina) Vinko Marinović 90/10 (1995–99)
- (Serbia) Jovan Markoski 7/0 (2000–01)
- (Serbia) Aleksandar Marković 75/1 (1964–71)
- (Serbia) Marjan Marković 185/11 (2000–05, 2008–09)
- (Serbia) Predrag Marković 4/0 (1956–57)
- (Serbia) Saša Marković 12/14 (1998)
- (Montenegro) Slobodan Marović 171/5 (1986–91)
- (Serbia) Milan Martinović 17/0 (2001–02)
- (Serbia) Novak Martinović 8/0 (2013–14)
- (Montenegro) Nenad Maslovar 73/25 (1992–94)
- (Serbia) Zoran Mašić 17/5 (1994–96)
- (Brazil) Matheus 7 (2025–)
- (Serbia) Vladimir Matijašević 42/0 (2000–02)
- (Brazil) Bruno Matos 7/1 (2015–16)
- (Senegal) Mamadou Mbodj 10/1 (2014–15)
- (Serbia) Dejan Meleg 7/0 (2018)
- (Serbia) Vojislav Melić 189/20 (1960–67)
- (Brazil) Bruno Mezenga 18/5 (2011)
- (Bosnia and Herzegovina) Dragan Mićić 104/36 (1996–2000)
- (Serbia) Trifun Mihailović 105/20 (1964–74)
- (Serbia) Danijel Mihajlović 4/0 (2010–11)
- (Serbia) Siniša Mihajlović 66/19 (1990–92)
- (Serbia) Stefan Mihajlović 7/0 (2012–14)
- (Serbia) Nikola Mijailović 55/4 (2008, 2013–15)
- (Serbia) Srđan Mijailović 138/2 (2010–13, 2022–24)
- (Serbia) Dušan Mijatović 1/0 (1946–47)
- (Montenegro) Nikola Mijušković 16/3 (1960)
- (Serbia) Nikola Mikić 85/8 (2010–13)
- (Serbia) Boban Miladinov 1/0 (1986–87)
- (Serbia) Bojan Miladinović 35/1 (2004–08)
- (Serbia) Branko Milanović 8/1 (1958–59)
- (Serbia) Dragan Miletović 176/1 (1978–85)
- (Serbia) Đorđe Milić 8/1 (1966–67)
- (Serbia) Ljubomir Milić 1/0 (1963–64)
- (Serbia) Nemanja Milić 48/5 (2017–18)
- (Serbia) Svetislav Milić 5/0 (1949–54)
- (Serbia) Tomislav Milićević 129/2 (1960–68)
- (Serbia) Nenad Milijaš 251/68 (2006–09, 2012–14, 2017–19)
- (Serbia) Ivica Milivojev 19/5 (1995–96)
- (Serbia) Luka Milivojević 47/7 (2012–13)
- (Bosnia and Herzegovina) Nenad Miljković 12/1 (1998–2000)
- (Serbia) Goran Milojević 138/12 (1982–88)
- (Serbia) Ljubiša Milojević 11/1 (1989–91)
- (Serbia) Vladan Milojević 15/0 (1995–96)
- (Serbia) Zvonko Milojević 203 (1989–97)
- (Serbia) Nedeljko Milosavljević 138/15 (1977–85)
- (Serbia) Slobodan Milosavljević 2/1 (1961–62)
- (Serbia) Veljko Milosavljević 26/0 (2024–)
- (Serbia) Selimir Milošević 95/39 (1958–66)
- (Serbia) Stefan Milošević 3/0 (2016–18)
- (Serbia) Dejan Milovanović 231/28 (2001–08, 2010–11)
- (Serbia) Đorđe Milovanović 166/12 (1978–85)
- (Angola) Felício Milson 46/10 (2024–)
- (Serbia) Luka Milunović 61/14 (2012–14)
- (Serbia) Nemanja Milunović 126/11 (2019–21, 2022–24)
- (Serbia) Miljan Miljanić 13/0 (1951–57)
- (Serbia) Ognjen Mimović 34/1 (2023–25)
- (Serbia) Marko Mirić 24/1 (2012–13)
- (Serbia) Đorđe Mirković 2/1 (1946–48)
- (Montenegro) Vladislav Mirković 29/7 (1999–2004)
- (Serbia) Slobodan Miškov 6/1 (1948)
- (Serbia) Blagoje Mitić 39/1 (1959–64)
- (Serbia) Milovan Mitić 1/0 (1970)
- (Serbia) Rajko Mitić 294/109 (1945–58)
- (Serbia) Slobodan Mitić 5/0 (1964–66)
- (Serbia) Zoran Mitić 1/0 (1979–80)
- (Serbia) Borisav Mitrović 1/0 (1979–80)
- (Serbia) Marko Mitrović 2/0 (1995–96)
- (Serbia) Jovan Mituljikić 1 (2021–25)
- (Serbia) Nikola Mituljikić 9 (2021–25)
- (Serbia) Dragan Mladenović 92/13 (2002–04, 2005–06)
- (Serbia) Filip Mladenović 60/3 (2012–13)
- (Serbia) Rade Mojović 1 (1994–95)
- (Colombia) Mauricio Molina 19/3 (2007–08)
- (Serbia) Ivica Momčilović 49/2 (1990–91, 1992–93)
- (Argentina) Pablo Mouche 14/0 (2016)
- (Serbia) Dragan Mrđa 82/31 (2001–05, 2013–14)
- (Serbia) Andrej Mrkela 2/0 (2008–09)
- (Serbia) Mitar Mrkela 208/46 (1983–90)
- (Croatia) Srđan Mrkušić 74 (1946–53)
- (Serbia) Vladimir Mudrinić 50/1 (2004–06)
- (Serbia) Ognjen Mudrinski 25/12 (2012–13)
- (Montenegro) Marko Mugoša 1/0 (2010)
- (Bosnia and Herzegovina) Husref Musemić 110/38 (1985–89)
- (France) Marko Muslin 3/0 (2003)
- (Serbia) Slavoljub Muslin 183/5 (1975–81)
- (Ghana) Ibrahim Mustapha 19/0 (2022–23)

== N ==
- (North Macedonia) Ilija Najdoski 162/8 (1988–92)
- (Serbia) Velimir Naumović 5/0 (1953–55)
- (Senegal) Cherif Ndiaye 87/39 (2023–25)
- (Serbia) Saša Nedeljković 17/0 (1992–93)
- (Serbia) Goran Negić 1/0 (1988–90)
- (Serbia) Ljubo Nenadić 4/0 (2012–14)
- (Serbia) Branko Nešović 67/0 (1948–58)
- (Serbia) Dragan Nikitović 19/0 (1974–79)
- (Serbia) Dragan Nikolić 1/0 (1981)
- (Serbia) Dušan Nikolić 154/5 (1970–80)
- (Serbia) Jovica Nikolić 115/15 (1983–89)
- (Serbia) Marko Nikolić 1/0 (2006–07)
- (Montenegro) Nemanja Nikolić 37/1 (2008–10)
- (Serbia) Veljko Nikolić 82/10 (2018–23)
- (North Macedonia) Vladimir Nikolovski 9/3 (1958–60)
- (Serbia) Pavle Ninkov 110/3 (2008–11)
- (Serbia) Miloš Ninković 33/5 (2013–14)
- (Serbia) Zoran Njeguš 103/13 (1995–98)
- (Serbia) Mile Novković 148/5 (1969–78)

== O ==
- (Serbia) Dragan Obradović 1/0 (1959–62)
- (Serbia) Nemanja Obrić
- (Kenya) Richard Odada 2/0 (2021–22)
- (Serbia) Tihomir Ognjanov 88/29 (1949–53)
- (Serbia) Konstantin Ognjanović 13/4 (1993–94, 1995–96)
- (Serbia) Perica Ognjenović 126/37 (1994–98)
- (Serbia) Radivoj Ognjanović 19/6(1962–63)
- (Nigeria) Peter Olayinka 60/14 (2023–)
- (Norway) Ohi Omoijuanfo 24/12 (2021–22)
- (Nigeria) Ifeanyi Onyilo 8/0 (2013–14)
- (Montenegro) Sanibal Orahovac 45/7 (2001–04)
- (Montenegro) Petar Orlandić 34/15 (2015–17)
- (Serbia) Mikloš Orsag 6/0 (1975–76)
- (Serbia) Stevan Ostojić 171/75 (1965–71)
- (Cameroon) Aboubakar Oumarou 15/2 (2008–09)
- (Serbia) Ognjen Ožegović 4/0 (2012–13)

== P ==
- (Brazil) Vinícius Pacheco 2/0 (2011–12)
- (Serbia) Bela Palfi 99/9 (1948–53)
- (Serbia) Aleksandar Panajotović 88/27 (1970–76)
- (North Macedonia) Darko Pančev 141/116 (1988–92)
- (Serbia) Radovan Pankov 115/3 (2019–23)
- (Serbia) Marko Pantelić 60/33 (2004–05)
- (Serbia) Miodrag Pantelić 139/25 (1996–2000)
- (Serbia) Aleksandar Pantić 28/0 (2006–08)
- (Serbia) Aleksandar Pantić 15/1 (2012–13)
- (Serbia) Miloš Pantović 1/0 (2019)
- (South Africa) Bernard Parker 18/6 (2009)
- (Antigua and Barbuda) Josh Parker 14/4 (2015–16)
- (Montenegro) Savo Pavićević 63/2 (2014–16)
- (Serbia) Milan Pavkov 152/59 (2017–22)
- (Serbia) Bojan Pavlović 6 (2009–10)
- (Serbia) Miroslav Pavlović 264/3 (1967–74)
- (Serbia) Zoran Pavlović 36/5 (1980–82, 1986, 1988–89)
- (Bosnia and Herzegovina) Srđan Pecelj 59/1 (1995–95, 1997–99)
- (Serbia) Vladimir Pečenčić 16/15 (1945–46)
- (Slovenia) Nejc Pečnik 51/11 (2013–14)
- (Serbia) Nemanja Pejčinović 15/0 (2009)
- (Serbia) Nino Pekarić 4/0 (2008–09)
- (Montenegro) Dojčin Perazić 1/0 (1968–70)
- (Serbia) Marko Perović 123/12 (2002–08, 2012)
- (Serbia) Marko Perović 41/8 (1994–95)
- (Serbia) Slavko Perović 60/14 (2009–11)
- (Montenegro) Željko Perović 5/0 (1998–99)
- (Serbia) Aleksandar Pešić 51/29 (2017–18)
- (Serbia) Dejan Pešić 5 (1997–2002)
- (Serbia) Miladin Pešterac 19/0 (1982–85)
- (Serbia) Dejan Petković 140/39 (1992–95)
- (Serbia) Marko Petković 107/4 (2013–17)
- (Serbia) Nikola Petković 25/0 (2008, 2011–13)
- (Serbia) Aleksandar Petrović 1/0 (1952)
- (Serbia) Mihailo Petrović 7/0 (1977–79)
- (Serbia) Miodrag Mališa Petrović 1 (1945–48)
- (Serbia) Miomir Petrović 60/0 (1945–48)
- (Serbia) Njegoš Petrović 87/3 (2019–22)
- (Serbia) Ognjen Petrović 144/3 (1967–76)
- (Serbia) Vladimir Petrović 332/66 (1972–82)
- (Guadeloupe) Thomas Phibel 17/0 (2016)
- (Italy) Cristiano Piccini 14/0 (2022)
- (Serbia) Darko Pivaljević 7/2 (1994–95)
- (Serbia) Mihailo Pjanović 148/92 (1999–2003)
- (Serbia) Bogdan Planić 6/0 (2014–15)
- (Serbia) Srđan Plavšić 73/10 (2015–17)
- (Serbia) Dražen Podunavac 24/2 (1995–96)
- (Serbia) Marko Poletanović 28/4 (2016–17)
- (Serbia) Radojko Popadić 4/0 (1957–59)
- (North Macedonia) Goran Popov 3/0 (2004)
- (Montenegro) Dragan Popović 6/1 (1963–64)
- (Serbia) Ivan Popović 43/17 (1955–61)
- (Serbia) Miodrag Popović 8/0 (1945–46)
- (Serbia) Vladica Popović 291/10 (1953–65)
- (Serbia) Zoran Popović 38 (2018–24)
- (Serbia) Zoran Prljinčević 71/51 (1962–65)
- (Croatia) Robert Prosinečki 161/35 (1987–91)
- (Russia) Yegor Prutsev 25/0 (2022–)
- (Serbia) Nikola Prvulović 24 (1953–55)
- (Serbia) Petar Puača 14/4 (1996)
- (Serbia) Dragan Punišić 12/1 (1987–88)
- (Montenegro) Milan Purović 56/23 (2005–07)

== R ==
- (Serbia) Dragomir Racić 35 (1966–71, 1973–75)
- (Serbia) Uroš Račić 45/3 (2016–18)
- (Serbia) Savo Radanović 2 (2025–)
- (Serbia) Petar Radenković 1 (1952)
- (Serbia) Pavle Radić 2/0 (1949–51)
- (Serbia) Rade Radić 1/0 (1969)
- (Serbia) Zvonko Radić 1/0 (1979–81)
- (Montenegro) Duško Radinović 165/13 (1989–93)
- (Serbia) Saša Radivojević 16 (2006–08)
- (Serbia) Nikola Radmanović 118/1 (1992–96)
- (Serbia) Dušan Radonjić 2/0 (1962–63)
- (Serbia) Nemanja Radonjić 79/20 (2017–18, 2024–)
- (United States) Predrag Radosavljević - Preki 1/0 (1982–85)
- (Serbia) Vladan Radosavljević 1/0 (1992–93)
- (Serbia) Zoran Radosavljević 22/0 (1996–97)
- (Serbia) Miodrag Radošević 3/0 (1957–60)
- (Serbia) Slavko Radovanović 127/10 (1980–83, 1985–89)
- (Montenegro) Aleksandar Radović 1/0 (2005–06)
- (Montenegro) Branko Radović 121/1 (1969–77)
- (Croatia) Jovica Raduka 2/0 (1973–75)
- (Montenegro) Andrija Radulović 16/2 (2020–22)
- (Serbia) Tatomir Radunović 10 (1958–59)
- (Serbia) Milovan Rajevac 14/0 (1978–79)
- (Serbia) Milenko Rajković 42/1 (1980–83)
- (Serbia) Predrag Rajković 37(2013–15)
- (Serbia) Đorđe Rakić 21/7 (2013–15)
- (Serbia) Živan Rakić 11/0 (1967–69)
- (Montenegro) Marko Rakonjac 17/3 (2023)
- (Serbia) Ivan Ranđelović 174 (2001–08)
- (Serbia) Blažo Raosavljević 3/0 (1992–93)
- (Serbia) Branko Rašić 1/0 (1993–94)
- (Croatia) Petar Rašić 1/0 (1961)
- (Serbia) Milanko Rašković 49/11 (2005–08)
- (Serbia) Nikola Rašković 1/0 (1954)
- (Bosnia and Herzegovina) Milorad Ratković 45/7 (1990–92)
- (Serbia) Radivoje Ratković 48/8 (1973–77)
- (Serbia) Miloš Reljić 2/1 (2006–07)
- (Montenegro) Stevan Reljić 26/2 (2010–11)
- (Serbia) Zoran Rendulić 25/1 (2015–17)
- (Bosnia and Herzegovina) Srebrenko Repčić 120/31 (1979–83)
- (Brazil) Ricardinho 9/1 (2017)
- (Serbia) Mihailo Ristic 91/7 (2013–17)
- (Serbia) Zoran Riznić 9/2 (1995)
- (Liberia) Omega Roberts 3/0 (2013)
- (Serbia) Milan Rodić 294/15 (2017–25)
- (Brazil) Rodrigão 5/0 (2025–)
- (Panama) José Luis Rodríguez 6/1 (2024)
- (Serbia) Anton Rudinski 195/79 (1953–62)
- (Costa Rica) John Jairo Ruiz 35/6 (2016–17)

== S ==
- (Serbia) Nenad Sakić 103/2 (1994–97)
- (Ecuador) Franklin Salas 7/0 (2007–08)
- (Colombia) Keimer Sandoval 2/0 (2025–)
- (Ivory Coast) Sékou Sanogo 99/4 (2020–23)
- (Bosnia and Herzegovina) Boris Savić 1/0 (2006)
- (Serbia) Dušan Savić 258/149 (1973–82)
- (Bosnia and Herzegovina) Duško Savić 8/0 (1991–92)
- (Serbia) Lenko Savić 1/0 (1958–61)
- (Serbia) Miodrag Savić 6/1 (1945–46)
- (Bosnia and Herzegovina) Radomir Savić 50/7 (1979–83)
- (Serbia) Vujadin Savić 83/1 (2009–10, 2017–19)
- (Montenegro) Dejan Savićević 118/41 (1988–92, 1999)
- (Montenegro) Vukan Savićević 51/6 (2012–15)
- (Brazil) Sávio 49/4 (2009–11)
- (South Korea) Seol Young-woo 49/6 (2024–)
- (Serbia) Predrag Sikimić 51/12 (2015–17)
- (Democratic Republic of the Congo) Silas 24/7 (2024–25)
- (Brazil) Fabio Silva 2/0 (2005–06)
- (Brazil) Jeff Silva 8/0 (2009–10)
- (Serbia) Dragan Simeunović 41 (1976–78, 1980–82)
- (Serbia) Milan Simeunović 36 (1987, 1992–96)
- (Slovenia) Marko Simeunovič 0 (1989–91)
- (Serbia) Veljko Simić 62/15(2018–20)
- (Serbia) Zoran Simić 8/1 (1978–79)
- (Serbia) Dragomir Skerlić 2/0 (1945–46)
- (Serbia) Slobodan Slović 12/0 (1998–99)
- (Democratic Republic of the Congo) Ibrahim Somé Salombo 19/4 (2008–09)
- (Serbia) Ljubiša Spajić 216/11 (1945–46, 1952–60)
- (Serbia) Uroš Spajić 71/6 (2010–13, 2023–25)
- (Serbia) Darko Spalević 17/0 (2001–02)
- (Austria) Srđan Spiridonović 24/4 (2020)
- (Serbia) Nenad Srećković 2/0 (2006–07)
- (Serbia) Vojislav Srdić 12/1 (1957–58)
- (Serbia) Slavoljub Srnić 209/22 (2010–11, 2015–18, 2021–23)
- (New Zealand) Marko Stamenić 35/2 (2023–24)
- (Serbia) Saša Stamenković 94 (2008–11)
- (Serbia) Srboljub Stamenković 58/18 (1975–81)
- (Serbia) Dragan Stančić 9/0 (2004–05, 2007)
- (Serbia) Momčilo Stanić 1/0 (1952)
- (Serbia) Aleksandar Stanković 5/2 (1945–46)
- (Bosnia and Herzegovina) Branko Stanković 243/17 (1945–58)
- (Serbia) Dejan Stanković 1/0 (1977)
- (Serbia) Dejan Stanković 114/38 (1995–98)
- (Serbia) Jovan Stanković 59/2 (1992–96)
- (Serbia) Nikola Stanković 16/2 (2020–23, 2025–)
- (Serbia) Predrag Stanković 65/8 (1994–96)
- (Serbia) Darko Stanojlović 8/1 (1996–97)
- (Serbia) Dejan Stefanović 77/10 (1993–95)
- (Serbia) Slavoljub Stefanović 5/0 (1947–48)
- (Serbia) Dragoslav Stepanović 34/2 (1973–76)
- (Serbia) Goran Stevanović 1/0(1979–80)
- (Serbia) Dragan Stevanović 34/9 (1999–2001)
- (Bosnia and Herzegovina) Nikola Stipić 118/24 (1956–66)
- (Serbia) Aleksandar Stojanović 184 (1976–83)
- (Serbia) Boban Stojanović 20/1 (1999–2002)
- (Serbia) Dimitrije Stojanović 70/0 (1951–61)
- (Serbia) Dragan Stojanović 11/1 (1963–66)
- (Serbia) Ljubiša Stojanović 43/1 (1980–85)
- (Serbia) Miloš Stojanović 5/0 (2013–15)
- (Croatia) Mirko Stojanović 93 (1962–65)
- (Serbia) Nenad Stojanović 35/13 (2003–05)
- (Serbia) Saša Stojanović 20/2 (2015–16)
- (Serbia) Stevan Stojanović 168 (1982–91)
- (Serbia) Nemanja Stojić 4/0 (2024)
- (Serbia) Goran Stojiljković 22/10 (1994–95)
- (Serbia) Nikola Stojiljković 15/5 (2018)
- (Serbia) Dragan Stojković 159/65 (1986–90)
- (Montenegro) Filip Stojković 96/2 (2011–12, 2017–19)
- (Serbia) Nikola Stojković 1/0 (2013)
- (Serbia) Strahinja Stojković 6/0 (2025)
- (Serbia) Vladimir Stojković 29 (2001–03, 2005–06)
- (North Macedonia) Mitko Stojkovski 123/3 (1991–95)
- (Serbia) Vlada Stošić 151/23 (1984–86, 1988–91)
- (Azerbaijan) Branimir Subašić 15/4 (2008–10)
- (Ghana) Rashid Sumaila 5/0 (2018–19)
- (Bosnia and Herzegovina) Nemanja Supić 6 (2015–19)
- (Serbia) Duško Suručić 1/0 (1988–89)
- (Bosnia and Herzegovina) Sead Sušić 104/27 (1970–78)
- (Japan) Takayuki Suzuki 9/2 (2006)

== Š ==
- (Montenegro) Refik Šabanadžović 88/5 (1987–91)
- (Serbia) Momčilo Šapinac (1945–48)
- (Serbia) Dragan Šarac 39/1 (2003–05)
- (Serbia) Dragomir Šećerov 35/14 (1946–48)
- (Serbia) Dragoslav Šekularac 203/37 (1955–66)
- (Serbia) Mirko Šekularac 23/0 (1960–64)
- (Bosnia and Herzegovina) Miloš Šestić 277/62 (1974–84)
- (Montenegro) Vasilije Šijaković 19/2 (1952–54)
- (Slovenia) Mirnes Šišić 13/0 (2009)
- (Serbia) Dalibor Škorić 62/14 (1997–2000)
- (Serbia) Slobodan Škrbić 116/3 (1961–71)
- (Serbia) Jovan Šljivić 43/5 (2023–)
- (Serbia) Ištvan Šorban 4/0 (1965–66)
- (Croatia) Miroslav Šugar 92/2 (1982–86)

== T ==
- (Brazil) Ely Tadeu 12/0 (2006–07)
- (Serbia) Dimitrije Tadić 77/4 (1948–55)
- (Serbia) Josip Takač 29/7 (1948–50)
- (Croatia) Miroslav Tanjga 32/1 (1991–92)
- (Serbia) Lazar Tasić 189/22 (1954–61)
- (Serbia) Momčilo Tasić 3/2 (1946–47)
- (Serbia) Uroš Tegeltija 1/0 (2025)
- (Serbia) Ognjen Teofilović 1/0 (2025)
- (Serbia) Aleksa Terzić 2/0 (2018–19)
- (Armenia) Nair Tiknizyan 7/0 (2025–)
- (Serbia) Vladimir Tintor 11/0 (2004–05)
- (Portugal) Tomané 32/8 (2019–20)
- (Serbia) Kosta Tomašević 151/137 (1945–54)
- (Serbia) Novak Tomić 138/3 (1954–64)
- (Serbia) Nenad Tomović 43/1 (2006–09)
- (Slovenia) Ivan Toplak 120/70 (1954–60)
- (Serbia) Duško Tošić 53/2 (2010–12)
- (Bosnia and Herzegovina) Rade Tošić 18/0 (1990–92)
- (Serbia) Nikola Trajković 50/2 (2005–09)
- (North Macedonia) Ivan Tričkovski 31/4 (2007–09)
- (Serbia) Miloš Trifunović 33/14 (2010–11)
- (Serbia) Aleksandar Trišović 31/1 (2006–08)
- (Serbia) Zdravko Tumbin 1/0 (1949–55)
- (Serbia) Đorđe Tutorić 81/2 (2006–08, 2009–10)

== U ==
- (Niger) Franklin Tebo Uchenna (2025–)
- (Serbia) Zoran Urumov 4/0 (1995–96, 1998–99)

== V ==
- (Netherlands) Rajiv van La Parra 11/1 (2019–20)
- (Serbia) Nenad Vanić 43/4 (1996–97)
- (Serbia) Goran Vasilijević 132/8 (1988–94)
- (Serbia) Nikola Vasiljević 7/0 (2009–11)
- (Serbia) Velibor Vasović 14/0 (1963)
- (Serbia) Dragiša Veljković 13/0 (1947–48)
- (Serbia) Miloš Veljković 6/0 (2025–)
- (Israel) Idan Vered 10/1 (2015)
- (Serbia) Stevan Veselinov 43/13 (1953–56)
- (Serbia) Miloš Vesić 5 (2011–14)
- (Montenegro) Marko Vešović 110/4 (2010–13)
- (Serbia) Risto Vidaković 77/20 (1992–94)
- (Serbia) Nemanja Vidić 92/15 (2001–04)
- (Portugal) Hugo Vieira 51/28 (2015–16)
- (Serbia) Milan Vilotić 62/3 (2009–12)
- (Serbia) Ede Višinka 15/1 (1996–97)
- (Serbia) Milivoje Vitakić 138/3 (1998–2004)
- (Montenegro) Aleksandar Vlahović 5/1 (1993–94)
- (Romania) Sorin Vlaicu 16/0 (1992–93)
- (Montenegro) Zoran Vorotović 12/0 (1986–87)
- (Bosnia and Herzegovina) Ognjen Vranješ 5/0 (2008–09)
- (Serbia) Branimir Vratnjan 19/1 (1965–67)
- (Serbia) Vanja Vučićević 2/0 (2016–17)
- (Serbia) Srđan Vujaklija 10/2 (2017)
- (Bosnia and Herzegovina) Zoran Vujović 17/0 (1989–90)
- (Serbia) Aleksa Vukanović 83/14(2019–22)
- (Serbia) Dragomir Vukićević 56 (1959–63)
- (Serbia) Veljko Vukojević 1 (2024)
- (Serbia) Dragomir Vukobratović 2 (2008–09)
- (Serbia) Ivan Vukomanović 68/3 (1999–2001)
- (Serbia) Branislav Vukosavljević 97/47 (1947–53)
- (Serbia) Jagoš Vuković 1/0 (2005–06)
- (Serbia) Dragan Vulević 18/6 (1996–97)
- (Serbia) Miloš Vulić 40/6 (2019–20)

== W ==
- (Brazil) Willians Bartolomeu 7/2 (1998)

== Z ==
- (Serbia) Aleksandar Zarić 2/0 (1950–55)
- (Serbia) Luka Zarić 1/0 (2025)
- (Croatia) Branko Zebec 34/5 (1959–61)
- (Montenegro) Miljan Zeković 225/0 (1951–60)
- (Bosnia and Herzegovina) Miralem Zjajo 5/0 (1985–86)
- (Serbia) Siniša Zlatković 91/11 (1950–55)
- (Serbia) Saša Zorić 26/1 (2000–01)
- (Serbia) Ivan Zvekanović 25/0 (1950–52)

== Ž ==
- (Serbia) Nikola Žigić 110/71 (2003–06)
- (Serbia) Milan Živadinović 7/1 (1963–68)
- (Serbia) Goran Živanović 2 (1979–83)
- (Serbia) Todor Živanović 89/67 (1948–58)
- (Serbia) Bratislav Živković 134/9 (1994–98)
- (Serbia) Dragoljub Živković 26/2 (1964–69)
- (Serbia) Marjan Živković 1/0 (1992–93)
- (Bosnia and Herzegovina) Milan Živković 1/0 (1993)
- (Curaçao) Richairo Živković 14/1 (2021–22)
- (Serbia) Radoslav Žugić 10/3 (1981–85)
- (Serbia) Dragoljub Župac 3/2 (1951–53)

== Players without an official appearance ==
- (Ghana) Addoquaye Addo (2008)
- (Serbia) Keti Agošten (1946)
- (Serbia) Nemanja Ahčin (2012–16)
- (Saudi Arabia) Mohammed Alhazmy (2023)
- (Serbia) Nenad Andrijević (1982)
- (Serbia) Vojislav Antić (1967)
- (Serbia) Dejan Antonić (1988)
- (Serbia) Ljuba Antonović (1949)
- (Serbia) Ljubija Arsenović (1949)
- (Serbia) Boban Arsić (1985)
- (Germany) Alexander Arsovic (2001)
- (Uganda) Khalid Aucho (2017)
- (Ghana) Edmund Addo (2023)
- (Bosnia and Herzegovina) Mehmed Avdagić (1973)
- (Serbia) Sava Avramović (1969)
- (Serbia) Branko Babić (1969)
- (Serbia) Slobodan Baćić (1999)
- (Serbia) Dušan Bakić (1949)
- (Serbia) Miroslav Balašćak (1973)
- (Serbia) Stevan Balov (1958–59)
- (Serbia) Severin Bijelić (1945)
- (Czech Republic) Vladan Binić (2010–12)
- (Serbia) Ljubivoje Bliznaković (1956)
- (Serbia) Mile Bogdanović (1946)
- (Montenegro) Vid Bokan(1966–67)
- (Serbia) Ilija Borenović (2000)
- (Serbia) Vlada Božić (1948)
- (Croatia) Željko Brnčić (1977)
- (Serbia) Predrag Bubanja (1968)
- (Serbia) Ivan Bunjevac (1954)
- (Serbia) Mirko Bunjevčević (2000–01)
- (Serbia) Zoran Čikić (1978)
- (Serbia) Bora Čubrilo (1959)
- (Serbia) Zoran Ćinkul (1978)
- (Serbia) Čedomir Ćirković (1958)
- (Croatia) Nikola Demić (1954)
- (Bosnia and Herzegovina) Vlado Divić (1967–68)
- (Australia) Bobby Dragaš (2000–01)
- (Serbia) Josif Dragišić (1956–58)
- (Serbia) Ljubiša Drenovaković (1970–71)
- (Montenegro) Obrad Drobnjak (1972–74)
- (Serbia) Branislav Đurić (1973)
- (Senegal) Fallou Fall (2022)
- (Croatia) Ivan Fileš (1983–85)
- (Serbia) Ljubiša Filipović (1945)
- (Brazil) Fumaça (1998–99)
- (Serbia) Vojislav Gaković (1955–57)
- (Serbia) Vlastimir Golubičić (1945)
- (Brazil) Guiba (1997–98)
- (Serbia) Đorđe Hadžikostić (1958)
- (Serbia) Bogoljub Hristić (1966)
- (Serbia) Veljko Hutolarević (1951–53)
- (Serbia) Dragoljub Ilić (1966)
- (Serbia) Žika Jakovljević (1948)
- (Serbia) Aleksandar Jakšić (1973)
- (Serbia) Milorad Jocić (1954–56)
- (Serbia) Vladimir Jocić (1976)
- (Serbia) Živko Josić (1952)
- (Serbia) Branislav Jovanović (1976)
- (Serbia) Miodrag Jovanović (1945)
- (Serbia) Miodrag Kačarević (1948)
- (Serbia) Jovan Kašanin (1949–50)
- (Serbia) Andrija Katić (2019–)
- (Serbia) Dušan Kljajić (1982–83)
- (Serbia) Mile Kos (1946)
- (Serbia) Dušan Lazarević (1969–71)
- (Serbia) Miladin Lazić (1974–75)
- (Serbia) Milan Lazić (1976)
- (Bosnia and Herzegovina) Radivoje Lukić (1971)
- (Serbia) Stevan Luković (2013–14)
- (Croatia) Zvonko Ljubenko (1952)
- (Montenegro) Aleksandar Madžar (1995–2002)
- (Switzerland) Boban Maksimović (2008)
- (Serbia) Božidar Marjanović (1977)
- (Serbia) Đorđe Marjanović (1983,85)
- (Serbia) Nikola Marjanović (1975)
- (Serbia) Stanislav Martinović (1961)
- (Serbia) Ilija Matić (1948)
- (Serbia) Jovica Matić (1966)
- (Serbia) Saša Milanović (1979)
- (North Macedonia) Blagoja Milevski (1991)
- (Serbia) Dragan Milojević (1973)
- (Bosnia and Herzegovina) Milenko Milošević (1996–97)
- (Serbia) Sava Milošević (1951–52)
- (Serbia) Predrag Milovanović (1978)
- (New Zealand) Adam Mitchell (2016)
- (Serbia) Petar Mitrović (1954)
- (Serbia) Vladan Mladenović (1955–56)
- (North Macedonia) Risto Načevski (1947)
- (Serbia) Branislav Nedeljković (1969)
- (Serbia) Čedomir Nešković (1962)
- (Serbia) Ljubinko Nikodijević (1966)
- (Serbia) Ivan Ognjanov (1976)
- (Serbia) Miodrag Odavić (1969–70)
- (Bosnia and Herzegovina) Almin Osmanagić
- (Canada) Mario Ostojić (2000–01)
- (Serbia) Miloš Ostojić (1966)
- (Serbia) Vladimir Pančić(1947)
- (Serbia) Milan Pantelić (1966–67)
- (Serbia) Milutin Pantelić (1952)
- (Serbia) Dragan Pavlović (1981)
- (Serbia) Svetozar Pavlović (1967)
- (Serbia) Svetozar Pejčinović (1953–55)
- (Montenegro) Ivan Pejović (1968)
- (Serbia) Nebojša Peković (1980)
- (Serbia) Zvonko Perović (1949–50)
- (Serbia) Đorđe Pešić (1948)
- (Serbia) Nebojša Petković (1980)
- (Bosnia and Herzegovina) Sreten Petković (1955–57)
- (Serbia) Dušan Petrović (1946)
- (Bosnia and Herzegovina) Vladimir Pljevaljčić (1977)
- (Serbia) Živko Popadić (1945)
- (Montenegro) Dragan Popović (born 1953) (1973)
- (Serbia) Dragan Popović (born 1961) (1980)
- (Croatia) Marino Pušić (1991)
- (Serbia) Vlada Radičević (1948)
- (Montenegro) Mileta Radojević (1967–68)
- (Serbia) Svetislav Radosavljević (1973)
- (Serbia) Miroslav Radovanović (1973)
- (North Macedonia) Miodrag Radović (1979–80)
- (Serbia) Slobodan Radović (1968)
- (Slovenia) Aleksandar Rodić (2000)
- (Slovenia) Branko Roškar (1975)
- (Nigeria) Gbolahan Salami (2015)
- (Serbia) Zlatibor Savić (1964–66)
- (Serbia) Nenad Seferović (1968)
- (Serbia) Slavko Simić (1975)
- (Serbia) Dragomir Skerlić (1945–46)
- Živko Sokolovski (1951)
- (Serbia) Živorad Spasojević (1945)
- (Serbia) Aleksandar Stanković(2017–)
- Josif Stebih (1956–58)
- Slavoljub Stefanović (1947–48)
- (Serbia) Dragomir Stepović (1951)
- (Serbia) Miloš Stojilković (1952)
- (Serbia) Dragiša Stojanović (1983–84)
- (Serbia) Miodrag Stokić (1945)
- (Serbia) Subotić (1961)
- (Bosnia and Herzegovina) Nermin Šabić (1992)
- (Serbia) Duško Tomić (1978–79)
- (Serbia) Slavko Tošić(1959)
- (Serbia) Ivan Trutin(1956)
- (Serbia) Zdravko Tumbin (1949–55)
- (Serbia) Milijan Tupajić(1972–73)
- (North Macedonia) Gligor Uzunov (1982–83)
- (Serbia) Živko Vasiljev(1961)
- (Serbia) Dragan Vasiljević (1971–72)
- (Serbia) Nikola Vasiljević(2019–)
- (Serbia) Miroslav Veličković (1967–68)
- (Serbia) Pavle Veličković (1945)
- (Serbia) Dragan Veljković (1963)
- (Brazil) Mateus Viveiros (2017–18)
- (Bosnia and Herzegovina) Nenad Vranješ (1961)
- (Serbia) Božidar Vučković (1952)
- (Serbia) Branislav Vukadinović (1966)
- (Serbia) Goran Vukićević (1972)
- (Serbia) Dragan Vukmirović (1982)
- (Brazil) Zé Marcos (2017–19)
- (Serbia) Goran Zelenović (1976)
- (Serbia) Predrag Zeljić (1975)
- (Serbia) Milan Zlatanović (1949–50)
- (Croatia) Denuc Žurka (1982)

== Guests ==
Players from other clubs that have played with Red Star in unofficial games as guest players:

- (Serbia) Milan Bačvarević – Trepča
- (Serbia) Dušan Bajević – Velež Mostar
- (Serbia) Radoslav Bečejac – Partizan
- (Croatia) Rudolf Belin – Dinamo Zagreb
- (Croatia) Stjepan Bobek – Partizan (1947)
- (Serbia) Vujadin Boškov – Vojvodina
- (Croatia) Božo Broketa – Hajduk (1948)
- (Bosnia and Herzegovina) Josip Bukal – Željezničar Sarajevo
- (Croatia) Željko Čajkovski – Dinamo Zagreb (1948)
- (Serbia) Đorđe Čokić – Radnički Beograd
- (Serbia) Slobodan Dogandžić – Sloboda Užice
- (North Macedonia) Andon Dončevski – Vardar Skopje
- (Serbia) Milan Galić – Partizan
- (Serbia) Dragan Gugleta – OFK Beograd
- (Bosnia and Herzegovina) Fuad Hajrović – Sloboda Tuzla
- (Serbia) Aleksandar Ivoš – Vojvodina
- (Croatia) Jurica Jerković – Hajduk Split (1977)
- (Bosnia and Herzegovina) Josip Katalinski – Željezničar Sarajevo
- (Bosnia and Herzegovina) Abid Kovačević – Borac Banja Luka
- (Serbia) Vladica Kovačević – Partizan
- (Serbia) Blagomir Krivokuća – OFK Beograd
- (Serbia) Milan Ljubenović – Radnički Beograd
- (Croatia) Frane Matošić – Hajduk Split (1948)
- (Bosnia and Herzegovina) Muhamed Mujić – Velež Mostar
- (Bosnia and Herzegovina) Vahidin Musemić – FK Sarajevo
- (Slovenia) Branko Oblak – Olimpija Ljubljana
- (Serbia) Ljubomir Ognjanović – Radnički Niš
- (Serbia) Đorđe Pavlić – Vojvodina
- (Serbia) Aleksandar Petaković – Radnički Beograd
- (Serbia) Ilija Petković – OFK Beograd
- (Serbia) Zoran Prljinčević – Radnički Beograd
- (Slovenia) Tomislav Prosen – Maribor
- (Serbia) Ljubiša Rajković – Radnički Niš
- (Croatia) Ivica Reiss – Dinamo Zagreb
- (Serbia) Spasoje Samardžić – OFK Beograd
- (Montenegro) Uroš Savković – Budućnost Titograd
- (Croatia) Josip Skoblar – OFK Beograd
- (North Macedonia) Josip Srebrov – Vardar Skopje
- (Croatia) Nenad Šalov – Hajduk Split
- (Montenegro) Vasilije Šijaković – OFK Beograd
- (Bosnia and Herzegovina) Edhem Šljivo – FK Sarajevo (1977)
- (Serbia) Marko Valok – Partizan
- (Serbia) Todor Veselinović – Vojvodina
- (North Macedonia) Blagoje Vidinić – Radnički Beograd
- (Serbia) Slaviša Žungul – Hajduk Split

== Notes ==
It is possible that some players that have participated in European competition matches or in the domestic cup, in the seasons Red Star was not the winner, are missing (as of 9 August 2010)

The players that played during Yugoslav period have represented the flag that would correspond to the current countries, that were the correspondent Yugoslav republics back then.

== See also ==
- List of FK Partizan players
- List of FK Vojvodina players

== External sources ==
- Championship winning squads at Red Star official website
- Cup winning squads at Red Star official website
- All-time players at redstarbelgrade.info
- 1946–1991 League squads
- Players without official appearance at redstarbelgrade.info
