= 1963–64 Red Star Belgrade season =

Red Star Belgrade
1963–64 season
- Chairman: Milić Bugarčić (until 20 August); Radovan Pantović (from 20 August)
- Manager: Milorad Pavić
- Yugoslav First League: 1st
- Yugoslav Cup: Winners
- Intertoto Cup: Group stage
- Top goalscorer: League: Bora Kostić (15); All: Zoran Prljinčević (27)

During the 1963–64 season, Red Star Belgrade participated in the 1963–64 Yugoslav First League, 1963–64 Yugoslav Cup and 1963–64 Intertoto Cup.

== Season summary ==
Red Star won their second double in this season. Dragoslav Šekularac missed the majority of the season due to his mandatory military service.

== Squad ==
Name	Yugoslav First League		Yugoslav Cup		Intertoto Cup		Total	
Name	Apps	Goals	Apps	Goals	Apps	Goals	Apps	Goals
Goalkeepers
(Socialist Federal Republic of Yugoslavia) Mirko Stojanović	22	0	4	0	0	0	26	0
(Socialist Federal Republic of Yugoslavia) Petar Ćosić	4	0	1	0	6	0	11	0
(Socialist Federal Republic of Yugoslavia) Ratomir Dujković	0	0	0	0	4	0	4	0
Defenders
(Socialist Federal Republic of Yugoslavia) Milan Čop	24	0	5	1	6	1	35	2
(Socialist Federal Republic of Yugoslavia) Vladimir Durković	20	0	5	0	0	0	25	0
(Socialist Federal Republic of Yugoslavia) Slobodan Škrbić	19	0	3	0	3	0	25	0
(Socialist Federal Republic of Yugoslavia) Tomislav Milićević	11	0	1	0	6	0	18	0
(Socialist Federal Republic of Yugoslavia) Velibor Vasović	13	0	1	0	0	0	14	0
(Socialist Federal Republic of Yugoslavia) Novak Tomić	13	0	0	0	1	0	14	0
(Socialist Federal Republic of Yugoslavia) Blagoje Mitić	5	0	0	0	6	0	11	0
(Socialist Federal Republic of Yugoslavia) Živorad Jevtić	4	0	3	1	3	0	10	1
(Socialist Federal Republic of Yugoslavia) Dejan Bekić	0	0	2	0	3	0	5	0
(Socialist Federal Republic of Yugoslavia) Dragan Stojanović	3	1	1	0	0	0	4	1
(Socialist Federal Republic of Yugoslavia) Sava Karapandžić	0	0	1	0	0	0	1	0
Midfielders
(Socialist Federal Republic of Yugoslavia) Dragan Džajić	22	3	3	2	5	0	30	5
(Socialist Federal Republic of Yugoslavia) Vladica Popović	24	0	4	0	1	0	29	0
(Socialist Federal Republic of Yugoslavia) Vojislav Melić	23	0	4	1	1	1	28	2
(Socialist Federal Republic of Yugoslavia) Dušan Maravić	15	2	3	2	0	0	18	4
(Socialist Federal Republic of Yugoslavia) Nikola Stipić	10	2	4	0	0	0	14	2
(Socialist Federal Republic of Yugoslavia) Dragoslav Šekularac	6	1	2	0	0	0	8	1
(Socialist Federal Republic of Yugoslavia) Dragan Popović	4	1	1	0	2	0	7	1
(Socialist Federal Republic of Yugoslavia) Sreten Đurica	4	0	2	0	1	0	7	0
(Socialist Federal Republic of Yugoslavia) Ljubomir Milić	1	1	0	0	0	0	1	1
(Socialist Federal Republic of Yugoslavia) Dušan Andrić	1	0	0	0	0	0	1	0
Forwards
(Socialist Federal Republic of Yugoslavia) Bora Kostić	25	15	4	2	2	4	31	21
(Socialist Federal Republic of Yugoslavia) Zoran Prljinčević	22	14	2	5	4	8	28	27
(Socialist Federal Republic of Yugoslavia) Selimir Milošević	2	1	1	2	0	0	3	3
Players sold or loaned out during the season
(Socialist Federal Republic of Yugoslavia) Dušan Radonjić	0	0	0	0	6	0	6	0
(Socialist Federal Republic of Yugoslavia) Milan Živadinović	0	0	0	0	5	1	5	1
(Socialist Federal Republic of Yugoslavia) Mirko Šekularac	0	0	0	0	5	0	5	0
(Socialist Federal Republic of Yugoslavia) Luka Malešev	1	0	0	0	1	0	2	0
(Socialist Federal Republic of Yugoslavia) Jovan Anđelković	0	0	0	0	2	0	2	0

== Results ==
=== Yugoslav First League ===
Pos	Team	Pld	W	D	L	GF	GA	GD	Pts	Qualification or relegation
1	Red Star Belgrade (C)	26	14	8	4	45	22	+23	36	Qualification for European Cup preliminary round
2	OFK Belgrade	26	11	11	4	49	32	+17	33	Invitation for Inter-Cities Fairs Cup first round
3	Dinamo Zagreb	26	12	9	5	40	29	+11	33	Qualification for Cup Winners' Cup first round
4	Sarajevo	26	11	7	8	47	37	+10	29	
5	Partizan	26	9	8	9	34	26	+8	26	

Source: rsssf.org
Rules for classification: 1) points; 2) goal difference; 3) number of goals scored.
(C) Champions

Date	Opponent	Venue	Result	Scorers
18 August 1963	Hajduk Split	H	1–1	Kostić
25 August 1963	Trešnjevka	A	3–2	Prljinčević (2), Kostić
1 September 1963	Rijeka	H	2–1	Vranković (o.g.), Prljinčević
7 September 1963	Radnički Niš	H	2–1	Džajić, Cekić (o.g.)
22 September 1963	Novi Sad	A	2–2	Kostić (2)
29 September 1963	Sarajevo	H	2–0	Prljinčević, Kostić
13 October 1963	Velež	A	0–0	
20 October 1963	Vardar	H	3–1	Džajić, Kostić (2)
10 November 1963	Dinamo Zagreb	A	0–0	
17 November 1963	Partizan	H	1–0	Prljinčević
24 November 1963	OFK Beograd	A	0–0	
1 December 1963	Vojvodina	H	2–1	Kostić (2)
8 December 1963	Željezničar	A	2–3	Stipić, D. Popović
1 March 1964	Hajduk Split	A	2–3	Džajić, Prljinčević
8 March 1964	Trešnjevka	H	0–0	
15 March 1964	Rijeka	A	0–1	
22 March 1964	Radnički Niš	A	3–0	Maravić, Milić, D. Stojanović
29 March 1964	Novi Sad	H	6–1	Kostić, Prljinčević (3), Stipić, Maravić
5 April 1964	Sarajevo	A	3–2	Biogradlić (o.g.), Šekularac, Prljinčević
12 April 1964	Velež	H	2–0	Prljinčević, Kostić
19 April 1964	Vardar	A	0–1	
26 April 1964	Dinamo Zagreb	H	3–0	Milošević, Kasumović (o.g.), Prljinčević
3 May 1964	Partizan	A	2–0	Prljinčević (2)
31 May 1964	OFK Beograd	H	1–1	Kostić
7 June 1964	Vojvodina	A	0–0	
14 June 1964	Željezničar	H	3–1	Kostić (3)

=== Yugoslav Cup ===
Date	Opponent	Venue	Result	Scorers
6 November 1963	Metalac Valjevo	A	3–1	Čop (pen.), Melić, Kostić
24 April 1964	Hajduk Split	A	4–1	Milošević (2), Maravić (2)
29 April 1964	Proleter Zrenjanin	H	4–1 (a.e.t.)	Prljinčević (4)
20 May 1964	Novi Sad	H	2–1	Kostić, Džajić
24 May 1964	Dinamo Zagreb	H	3–0	Prljinčević, Jevtić, Džajić

=== Intertoto Cup ===
Pos	Team	Pld	W	D	L	GF	GA	GD	Pts
1	(Poland) Polonia Bytom (A)	6	2	3	1	17	10	+7	7
2	(Socialist Federal Republic of Yugoslavia) Red Star Belgrade	6	3	1	2	15	15	0	7
3	(East Germany) ASK Vorwärts Berlin	6	1	3	2	10	9	+1	5
4	(Czechoslovakia) Jednota Trenčín	6	2	1	3	7	15	−8	5

(A) Advanced to first round

Date	Opponent	Venue	Result	Scorers
23 June 1963	Vorwärts Berlin	A	2–2	Kostić, Melić
30 June 1963	Polonia Bytom	H	4–3	Kostić (3), Živadinović
7 July 1963	Jednota Trenčín	A	1–2	Prljinčević
13 July 1963	Jednota Trenčín	H	5–1	Prljinčević (4), Čop
20 July 1963	Polonia Bytom	A	1–6	Prljinčević
28 July 1963	Vorwärts Berlin	H	2–1	Prljinčević (2)

== See also ==
- List of Red Star Belgrade seasons
