= 2005–06 Red Star Belgrade season =

Red Star Belgrade
2005–06 season
- Chairman: Dragan Stojković
- Manager: Walter Zenga
- Serbia and Montenegro SuperLiga: 1st
- Serbia and Montenegro Cup: Winners
- UEFA Cup: Group stage
- Top goalscorer: League: Nikola Žigić, Boško Janković (12); All: Nikola Žigić (20)

During the 2005–06 season, Red Star Belgrade participated in the 2005–06 Serbia and Montenegro SuperLiga, 2005–06 Serbia and Montenegro Cup and 2005–06 UEFA Cup.

== Season summary ==
Red Star won their ninth double in this season.

== Squad ==
Name	Serbia and Montenegro SuperLiga		Serbia and Montenegro Cup		UEFA Cup		Total	
Name	Apps	Goals	Apps	Goals	Apps	Goals	Apps	Goals
Goalkeepers
(Serbia and Montenegro) Vladimir Stojković	21	0	0	0	6	0	27	0
(Serbia and Montenegro) Ivan Ranđelović	9	0	5	0	3	0	17	0
(Serbia and Montenegro) Zoran Banović	1	0	0	0	0	0	1	0
Defenders
(Serbia and Montenegro) Milan Dudić	28	3	2	0	8	0	38	3
(Serbia and Montenegro) Aleksandar Luković	27	3	2	1	8	0	37	4
(Serbia and Montenegro) Dušan Basta	25	0	3	2	6	1	34	3
(Serbia and Montenegro) Milan Biševac	20	0	2	0	6	0	28	0
(Serbia and Montenegro) Nebojša Joksimović	18	0	2	0	6	0	26	0
(Serbia and Montenegro) Bojan Miladinović	6	0	5	0	2	0	13	0
(Ghana) Haminu Draman	4	1	2	0	1	0	7	1
(Serbia and Montenegro) Dušan Anđelković	3	0	1	0	0	0	4	0
(Serbia and Montenegro) Jagoš Vuković	1	0	2	1	0	0	3	1
(Serbia and Montenegro) Nenad Tomović	1	0	0	0	0	0	1	0
(Serbia and Montenegro) Aleksandar Radović	0	0	1	0	0	0	1	0
(Bosnia and Herzegovina) Boris Savić	0	0	1	0	0	0	1	0
Midfielders
(Serbia and Montenegro) Boško Janković	26	12	2	0	7	1	35	13
(Serbia and Montenegro) Nenad Kovačević	25	1	2	0	8	0	35	1
(Serbia and Montenegro) Dejan Milovanović	23	2	5	2	3	0	31	4
(Serbia and Montenegro) Vladimir Mudrinić	20	0	2	0	7	0	29	0
(Serbia and Montenegro) Marko Perović	18	3	2	0	4	0	24	3
(Serbia and Montenegro) Dragan Mladenović	17	3	0	0	5	0	22	3
(Serbia and Montenegro) Nikola Trajković	13	2	3	0	3	0	19	2
(Serbia and Montenegro) Radovan Krivokapić	9	0	3	0	3	0	15	0
(Serbia and Montenegro) Nenad Milijaš	10	4	2	0	0	0	12	4
Forwards
(Serbia and Montenegro) Milan Purović	24	11	3	3	7	3	34	17
(Serbia and Montenegro) Nikola Žigić	23	12	3	2	7	6	33	20
(Serbia and Montenegro) Milanko Rašković	13	5	2	0	0	0	15	5
(Serbia and Montenegro) Dušan Đokić	9	8	2	0	0	0	11	8
(Japan) Takayuki Suzuki	6	0	1	2	0	0	7	2
(Serbia and Montenegro) Boban Stojanović	4	0	2	0	1	0	7	0
(Serbia and Montenegro) Filip Đorđević	1	0	2	0	0	0	3	0
Players sold or loaned out during the season
(Serbia and Montenegro) Slavoljub Đorđević	1	0	0	0	1	0	2	0
(Serbia and Montenegro) Marko Pantelić	3	0	0	0	2	3	5	3
(Serbia and Montenegro) Dragan Mrđa	1	0	0	0	0	0	1	0
(Brazil) Fábio Silva	0	0	2	0	0	0	2	0
(Serbia and Montenegro) Ardian Đokaj	8	2	3	1	3	1	14	4

== Results ==
=== Overview ===
Competition	Record							
Competition	P	W	D	L	GF	GA	GD	Win %
Serbia and Montenegro SuperLiga	30	25	3	2	73	23	+50	83.33
Serbia and Montenegro Cup	5	5	0	0	14	3	+11	100.00
UEFA Cup	8	3	3	2	15	10	+5	37.50
Total	43	33	6	4	102	36	+66	76.74

=== Serbia and Montenegro SuperLiga ===
Pos	Team	Pld	W	D	L	GF	GA	GD	Pts	Qualification or relegation
1	Red Star Belgrade (C)	30	25	3	2	73	23	+50	78	Qualification for Champions League second qualifying round
2	Partizan	30	22	5	3	53	17	+36	71	Qualification for UEFA Cup second qualifying round (Note: OFK Beograd qualified for 2006–07 UEFA Cup as runner-up of 2005–06 Serbia and Montenegro Cup.)
3	Voždovac	30	15	6	9	52	38	+14	51	Ineligible for 2006–07 European competitions
4	Hajduk Kula	30	13	11	6	41	26	+15	50	Qualification for UEFA Cup second qualifying round
5	Zeta	30	14	5	11	42	36	+6	47	Qualification for Intertoto Cup second round and Montenegrin First League

Source: RSSSF.org
Rules for classification: 1) points; 2) goal difference; 3) number of goals scored.
(C) Champions
Notes:

Date	Opponent	Venue	Result	Scorers
6 August 2005	Hajduk Kula	A	2–2	Janković (2)
20 August 2005	Voždovac	H	3–1	Janković (2), Trajković
28 August 2005	Borac Čačak	A	1–2	Žigić
10 September 2005	Budućnost Banatski Dvor	H	5–1	Janković, Kovačević (pen.), Žigić, Mladenović, Rašković
18 September 2005	Rad	A	4–2	Purović, Rašković, Žigić, Draman
21 September 2005	Jedinstvo Bijelo Polje	A	4–0	Žigić, Janković, Purović, Rašković
24 September 2005	Obilić	H	4–2	Purović, Žigić (2), Rašković
2 October 2005	Budućnost Podgorica	A	2–1	Purović, Rajović (o.g.)
15 October 2005	Partizan	H	2–0	Luković (pen.), Perović
22 October 2005	Smederevo	A	3–1	Purović (2), Žigić
29 October 2005	Javor Ivanjica	H	2–0	Perović, Janković
6 November 2005	OFK Beograd	A	1–0	Dudić
20 November 2005	Zemun	H	2–1	Mladenović, Đokaj
27 November 2005	Vojvodina	A	0–1	
4 December 2005	Zeta	H	3–2	Janković, Mladenović, Žigić
10 December 2005	Hajduk Kula	H	4–1	Trajković, Purović, Rašković, Janković
17 December 2005	Jedinstvo Bijelo Polje	H	4–0	Janković, Đokaj, Milovanović, Purović
18 February 2006	Voždovac	A	2–0	Đokić, Janković
25 February 2006	Borac Čačak	H	1–0	Janković
5 March 2006	Budućnost Banatski Dvor	A	3–0	Milovanović, Luković (pen.), Dudić
11 March 2006	Rad	H	1–0	Milijaš
21 March 2006	Obilić	A	3–2	Đokić (2), Luković (pen.)
25 March 2006	Budućnost Podgorica	H	4–0	Đokić (2), Milijaš, Žigić
1 April 2006	Partizan	A	0–0	
8 April 2006	Smederevo	H	2–0	Milijaš (2)
15 April 2006	Javor Ivanjica	A	2–1	Žigić (2)
22 April 2006	OFK Beograd	H	2–0	Đokić (2)
29 April 2006	Zemun	A	2–0	Purović (2)
3 May 2006	Vojvodina	H	3–1	Žigić, Đokić, Dudić
6 May 2006	Zeta	A	2–2	Purović, Perović

=== Serbia and Montenegro Cup ===
Date	Opponent	Venue	Result	Scorers
19 October 2005	Takovo	A	1–0	Milovanović
26 October 2005	Mladost Podgorica	H	2–1	Vuković, Đokaj
7 December 2005	Smederevo	H	2–0	Luković (pen.), Milovanović
11 April 2006	Radnički Niš	A	5–0	Suzuki (2), Basta, Purović (2)
10 May 2006	OFK Beograd	N	4–2 (a.e.t.)	Žigić (2), Purović, Basta

=== UEFA Cup ===
==== Second qualifying round ====
11 August 2005	Inter Zaprešić (Croatia)	1–3	(Serbia and Montenegro) Red Star Belgrade	Stadion ŠRC Zaprešić, Zaprešić
	Pecelj 41'	Report	Žigić 20', 49'; Pantelić 80'	Attendance: 4,500; Referee: Joaquim da Silva (Portugal)

25 August 2005	Red Star Belgrade (Serbia and Montenegro)	4–0	(Croatia) Inter Zaprešić	Red Star Stadium, Belgrade
	Janković 6'; Pantelić 41', 85'; Žigić 45'	Report		Attendance: 28,000; Referee: Hervé Piccirillo (France)

==== First round ====
15 September 2005	Red Star Belgrade (Serbia and Montenegro)	0–0	(Portugal) Braga	Red Star Stadium, Belgrade
		Report		Attendance: 40,000; Referee: Ruud Bossen (Netherlands)

29 September 2005	Braga (Portugal)	1–1	(Serbia and Montenegro) Red Star Belgrade	Estádio Municipal de Braga, Braga
	Jaime Júnior 86'	Report	Purović 11'	Attendance: 18,000; Referee: Franz-Xaver Wack (Germany)

==== Group stage ====
Pos	Team	Pld	W	D	L	GF	GA	GD	Pts	Qualification	STR	ROM	BSL	RSB	TRO
1	(France) Strasbourg	4	2	2	0	7	3	+4	8	Advance to knockout stage	—	—	—	2–2	2–0
2	(Italy) Roma	4	2	1	1	7	6	+1	7	Advance to knockout stage	1–1	—	3–1	—	—
3	(Switzerland) Basel	4	2	0	2	7	9	−2	6	Advance to knockout stage	0–2	—	—	—	4–3
4	(Serbia and Montenegro) Red Star Belgrade	4	1	1	2	7	8	−1	4		—	3–1	1–2	—	—
5	(Norway) Tromsø	4	1	0	3	7	9	−2	3		—	1–2	—	3–1	—

3 November 2005 1	Red Star Belgrade (Serbia and Montenegro)	1–2	(Switzerland) Basel	Red Star Stadium, Belgrade
	Purović 25'	Report	Delgado 30' (pen.); Rossi 88'	Attendance: Behind closed doors Referee: Knud Erik Fisker (Denmark)

24 November 2005 2	Tromsø (Norway)	3–1	(Serbia and Montenegro) Red Star Belgrade	Alfheim Stadion, Tromsø
	Kibebe 22'; Årst 37', 74' (pen.)	Report	Žigić 24'	Attendance: 5,000; Referee: Dick van Egmond (Netherlands)

1 December 2005 3	Red Star Belgrade (Serbia and Montenegro)	3–1	(Italy) Roma	Red Star Stadium, Belgrade
	Žigić 37', 86'; Purović 77'	Report	Nonda 23'	Attendance: 40,000; Referee: Martin Hansson (Sweden)

14 December 2005 4	Strasbourg (France)	2–2	(Serbia and Montenegro) Red Star Belgrade	Stade de la Meinau, Strasbourg
	Gameiro 78', 90+4'	Report	Basta 34'; Đokaj 63'	Attendance: 13,500; Referee: Stefan Messner (Austria)

== See also ==
- List of Red Star Belgrade seasons
