= Ognjen Teofilović =

Serbian footballer (born 2006)

Personal information
- Date of birth: 19 September 2006 (age 20)
- Place of birth: Belgrade, Serbia
- Height: 1.92 m (6 ft 4 in)
- Position: Forward

Team information
- Current team: Lugo
- Number: 21

Youth career
- Red Star Belgrade
- 2018–2019: Čukarički
- 2019–2022: Brodarac
- 2022: 011 Belgrade
- 2022–2023: Voždovac
- 2023–2024: TSC
- 2024–2025: Red Star Belgrade

Senior career*
Years	Team	Apps	(Gls)
2024–2025	Red Star Belgrade	0	(0)
2025–	Lugo	16	(3)
- * Club domestic league appearances and goals as of 9 June 2026

Ognjen Teofilović (Serbian Cyrillic: Огњен Теофиловић; born 19 September 2006) is a Serbian professional footballer who plays as a forward for Spanish Primera Federación club Lugo.

== Club career ==
A native of Vrčin, Teofilović started training at the Red Star Belgrade football school. From there, in 2018, he went to Čukarički, a year later to FK Brodarac, and then he played for the youth categories 011 and Voždovac. In 2023, he joined TSC and signed his first professional contract in the same year, and continued to train with the club's first team. The following year, he returned to his native Red Star Belgrade and signed a two-year contract.

Due to the insufficient number of players in training, due to the national team term, coach Vladan Milojević joined the work with the first team in March 2025 with 12 players from the youth team, including Teofilović. He sat on the bench in the round of 16 match of the Serbian Cup with OFK Beograd, and made his debut in the 83rd minute when he entered the game together with Uroš Tegeltija. They replaced Strahinja Stojković and Bruno Duarte on the field.

On 3 September 2025, Teofilović signed a four-year contract with Lugo in Spanish third-tier Primera Federación.

== Career statistics ==
As of match played 9 June 2026

Appearances and goals by club, season and competition
Club	Season	League			Serbian Cup		Europe		Total	
Club	Season	Division	Apps	Goals	Apps	Goals	Apps	Goals	Apps	Goals
Red Star Belgrade	2024–25	Serbian SuperLiga	0	0	1	0	0	0	1	0
CD Lugo	2025–26	Primera Federación	16	3	0	0	0	0	16	3
Career total			16	3	1	0	0	0	17	3

== Notes ==
- Фудбал, број 35 (PDF). FSS. 2018. COBISS 107563532
