= 1963–64 Yugoslav Cup =

1964 Yugoslav Football Cup
17th Marshal Tito Cup

Tournament details
- Country: Yugoslavia
- Dates: 22 April – 22 May
- Teams: 16

Final positions
- Champions: Red Star (6th title)
- Runners-up: Dinamo Zagreb
- Cup Winners' Cup: Red Star

Tournament statistics
- Matches played: 15
- Goals scored: 67 (4.47 per match)
- Goals scored in penalty shoot-outs not included.

The 1963–64 Yugoslav Cup was the 17th season of the top football knockout competition in SFR Yugoslavia, the Yugoslav Cup (Serbo-Croatian: Kup Jugoslavije), also known as the "Marshal Tito Cup" (Kup Maršala Tita), since its first edition in 1947.

== Round of 16 ==
In the following tables winning teams are marked in bold; teams from outside top level are marked in italic script.

The Round of 16 matches were held on 22 April.

Tie no	Home team	Score	Away team
1	**Budućnost Titograd**	1–0	Železničar Niš
2	**Dinamo Zagreb**	5–1	Rijeka
3	Hajduk Split	1–4	**Red Star**
4	**Novi Sad**	1–0	Sarajevo
5	**Olimpija Ljubljana**	2–0	Slavonija Osijek
6	**Proleter Zrenjanin**	1–0	Vojvodina
7	Radnički Niš	2–7	**Partizan**
8	Velež	3–4	**Pobeda Prilep**

== Quarter-finals ==
The quarter-finals were played on 29 April.

Tie no	Home team	Score	Away team
1	**Novi Sad**	3–2	Olimpija Ljubljana
2	**Partizan**	3–2	Budućnost Titograd
3	Pobeda Prilep	0–5	**Dinamo Zagreb**
4	**Red Star**	4–1 (a.e.t.)	Proleter Zrenjanin

== Semi-finals ==
The semi-finals were played on 20 May.

Tie no	Home team	Score	Away team
1	**Dinamo Zagreb**	7–2	Partizan
2	**Red Star**	2–1	Novi Sad

== Final ==
24 May 1964

Red Star	3–0	Dinamo Zagreb
Prljinčević 35'; Jevtić 48'; Džajić 70'

Stadion Crvena Zvezda, Belgrade
Attendance: 60,000
Referee: Aleksandar Škorić (Belgrade)

RED STAR:
GK	1	(Socialist Federal Republic of Yugoslavia) Mirko Stojanović
DF	2	(Socialist Federal Republic of Yugoslavia) Vladimir Durković
DF	3	(Socialist Federal Republic of Yugoslavia) Živorad Jevtić
DF	4	(Socialist Federal Republic of Yugoslavia) Vojislav Melić
DF	5	(Socialist Federal Republic of Yugoslavia) Milan Čop
MF	6	(Socialist Federal Republic of Yugoslavia) Vladica Popović
MF	7	(Socialist Federal Republic of Yugoslavia) Dragan Džajić
MF	8	(Socialist Federal Republic of Yugoslavia) Dušan Maravić
FW	9	(Socialist Federal Republic of Yugoslavia) Zoran Prljinčević
MF	10	(Socialist Federal Republic of Yugoslavia) Slobodan Škrbić
FW	11	(Socialist Federal Republic of Yugoslavia) Bora Kostić
Manager:
(Socialist Federal Republic of Yugoslavia) Milorad Pavić

DINAMO ZAGREB:
GK	1	(Socialist Federal Republic of Yugoslavia) Zlatko Škorić
DF	2	(Socialist Federal Republic of Yugoslavia) Nikola Benco
DF	3	(Socialist Federal Republic of Yugoslavia) Adem Kasumović
DF	4	(Socialist Federal Republic of Yugoslavia) Rudolf Belin
DF	5	(Socialist Federal Republic of Yugoslavia) Vlatko Marković
MF	6	(Socialist Federal Republic of Yugoslavia) Željko Perušić
MF	7	(Socialist Federal Republic of Yugoslavia) Zdenko Kobešćak
FW	8	(Socialist Federal Republic of Yugoslavia) Slaven Zambata
FW	9	(Socialist Federal Republic of Yugoslavia) Zdravko Rauš
MF	10	(Socialist Federal Republic of Yugoslavia) Stjepan Lamza
FW	11	(Socialist Federal Republic of Yugoslavia) Luka Lipošinović
Manager:
(Socialist Federal Republic of Yugoslavia) Milan Antolković

== See also ==
- 1963–64 Yugoslav First League
- 1963–64 Yugoslav Second League
