= Tomislav Milićević =

Yugoslav footballer (1940–2024)

Personal information
- Date of birth: 29 September 1940
- Place of birth: Kruševac, Yugoslavia
- Date of death: 24 October 2024 (aged 84)
- Height: 1.78 m (5 ft 10 in)
- Position: Defender

Senior career*
Years	Team	Apps	(Gls)
1958–1960	Napredak Kruševac	28	(5)
1960–1967	Red Star Belgrade	91	(2)
1968	Chicago Mustangs	25	(0)
1969–1970	Maribor	37	(0)
1970	Radnički Kragujevac	7	(0)
1971	Gazélec Ajaccio	15	(6)
Total		203	(13)
- * Club domestic league appearances and goals

Tomislav Milićević (Serbian Cyrillic: Томислав Милићевић; 29 September 1940 – 24 October 2024) was a Yugoslav and Serbian footballer who played as a defender.

== Playing career ==
Milićević started out at Napredak Kruševac, before joining Red Star Belgrade in 1960. He later played for the Chicago Mustangs of the North American Soccer League in 1968. After returning to Yugoslavia, Milićević spent some time with Maribor and Radnički Kragujevac. He finished his playing career at Gazélec Ajaccio in 1971.

== Post-playing career ==
After hanging up his boots, Milićević worked in Red Star Belgrade's youth system for over 30 years, discovering and developing many young prospects such as Dejan Stanković and Marko Pantelić, among others.

== Death ==
Milićević died in October 2024, at the age of 84.

== Honours ==
Red Star Belgrade

- Yugoslav First League: 1963–64
- Yugoslav Cup: 1963–64
