= 1963–64 Yugoslav Second League =

Yugoslav Second League
- Season: 1963–64
- Champions: NK Zagreb (West Division); Sutjeska (East Division)
- Promoted: NK Zagreb; Sutjeska
- Relegated: Bosna; Šparta Beli Manastir; Jedinstvo Zemun; OFK Subotica; Radnički Sombor

The 1963–64 Yugoslav Second League season was the 18th season of the Second Federal League (Serbo-Croatian: Druga savezna liga), the second level association football competition of SFR Yugoslavia, since its establishment in 1946. The league was contested in two regional groups (West Division and East Division), with 16 clubs each.

== West Division ==
=== Teams ===
A total of sixteen teams contested the league, including twelve sides from the 1962–63 season, one club relegated from the 1962–63 Yugoslav First League and three sides promoted from the third tier leagues played in the 1962–63 season. The league was contested in a double round robin format, with each club playing every other club twice, for a total of 30 rounds. Two points were awarded for wins and one point for draws.

Sloboda were relegated from the 1962–63 Yugoslav First League after finishing in the 13th place of the league table. The three clubs promoted to the second level were Bosna, Šparta Beli Manastir and NK Zagreb.

Locations of teams' home cities in the 1963–64 Yugoslav Second League West

Team	Location	Federal subject	Position in 1962–63
Borac Banja Luka	Banja Luka	SR Bosnia and Herzegovina	12th
Borovo	Borovo Naselje	SR Croatia	9th
Bosna	Visoko	SR Bosnia and Herzegovina	—
BSK Slavonski Brod	Slavonski Brod	SR Croatia	13th
Čelik	Zenica	SR Bosnia and Herzegovina	2nd
Famos Hrasnica	Hrasnica	SR Bosnia and Herzegovina	10th
Istra	Pula	SR Croatia	11th
Lokomotiva Zagreb	Zagreb	SR Croatia	8th
Maribor	Maribor	SR Slovenia	3rd
Olimpija Ljubljana	Ljubljana	SR Slovenia	6th
Slavonija Osijek	Osijek	SR Croatia	4th
Sloboda	Tuzla	SR Bosnia and Herzegovina	—
Šibenik	Šibenik	SR Croatia	7th
Šparta Beli Manastir	Beli Manastir	SR Croatia	—
Varteks	Varaždin	SR Croatia	5th
NK Zagreb	Zagreb	SR Croatia	—

=== League table ===
Pos	Team	Pld	W	D	L	GF	GA	GR	Pts	Promotion or relegation
1	NK Zagreb (C, P)	30	16	10	4	52	23	2.261	42	Promotion to Yugoslav First League
2	Maribor	30	17	6	7	57	21	2.714	40	
3	Borac Banja Luka	30	18	4	8	61	48	1.271	40	
4	Olimpija	30	14	8	8	55	31	1.774	36	
5	Slavonija	30	13	7	10	53	40	1.325	33	
6	Sloboda Tuzla	30	12	8	10	50	45	1.111	32	
7	Varteks	30	11	10	9	43	42	1.024	32	
8	Čelik	30	11	9	10	46	47	0.979	31	
9	Šibenik	30	9	12	9	38	41	0.927	30	
10	Lokomotiva Zagreb	30	10	10	10	43	50	0.860	30	
11	BSK Slavonski Brod	30	8	9	13	35	41	0.854	25	
12	Istra Pula	30	9	7	14	35	47	0.745	25	
13	Borovo	30	8	8	14	40	48	0.833	24	
14	Famos Hrasnica	30	7	9	14	35	52	0.673	23	
15	Bosna (R)	30	6	9	15	31	59	0.525	21	Relegation to Third Level
16	Šparta Beli Manastir (R)	30	5	6	19	31	70	0.443	16	Relegation to Third Level

Source: fsgzrenjanin.com
Rules for classification: 1st points; 2nd goal average
(C) Champions; (P) Promoted; (R) Relegated

== East Division ==
=== Teams ===
A total of sixteen teams contested the league, including twelve sides from the 1962–63 season, one club relegated from the 1962–63 Yugoslav First League and three sides promoted from the third tier leagues played in the 1962–63 season. The league was contested in a double round robin format, with each club playing every other club twice, for a total of 30 rounds. Two points were awarded for wins and one point for draws.

Budućnost were relegated from the 1962–63 Yugoslav First League after finishing in the 14th place of the league table. The three clubs promoted to the second level were Bor, Pobeda and Radnički Sombor.

Locations of teams' home cities in the 1963–64 Yugoslav Second League East

Team	Location	Federal subject	Position in 1962–63
Bačka	Bačka Palanka	(Socialist Republic of Serbia) SAP Vojvodina	6th
Bor	Bor	SR Serbia	—
Borac Čačak	Čačak	SR Serbia	10th
Budućnost	Titograd	SR Montenegro	—
Jedinstvo Zemun	Zemun	SR Serbia	11th
OFK Subotica	Subotica	(Socialist Republic of Serbia) SAP Vojvodina	7th
Pobeda	Prilep	SR Macedonia	—
Prishtina	Pristina	(Socialist Republic of Serbia) SAP Kosovo	5th
Proleter Zrenjanin	Zrenjanin	(Socialist Republic of Serbia) SAP Vojvodina	9th
Radnički Belgrade	Belgrade	SR Serbia	2nd
Radnički Sombor	Sombor	(Socialist Republic of Serbia) SAP Vojvodina	—
Spartak Subotica	Subotica	(Socialist Republic of Serbia) SAP Vojvodina	8th
Srem	Sremska Mitrovica	(Socialist Republic of Serbia) SAP Vojvodina	13th
Sutjeska	Nikšić	SR Montenegro	4th
Trepča	Kosovska Mitrovica	(Socialist Republic of Serbia) SAP Kosovo	3rd
Železničar Niš	Niš	SR Serbia	12th

=== League table ===
Pos	Team	Pld	W	D	L	GF	GA	GR	Pts	Promotion or relegation
1	Sutjeska Nikšić (C, P)	30	19	4	7	62	38	1.632	42	Promotion to Yugoslav First League
2	Bor	30	14	9	7	46	34	1.353	37	
3	Radnički Beograd	30	13	9	8	60	44	1.364	35	
4	Pobeda	30	13	7	10	46	40	1.150	33	
5	Trepča	30	13	6	11	52	45	1.156	32	
6	Železničar Niš	30	13	6	11	44	40	1.100	32	
7	Budućnost	30	12	7	11	46	35	1.314	31	
8	Borac Čačak	30	11	9	10	41	32	1.281	31	
9	Bačka	30	12	7	11	39	49	0.796	31	
10	Srem	30	11	8	11	38	40	0.950	30	
11	Proleter Zrenjanin	30	10	9	11	53	42	1.262	29	
12	Spartak Subotica	30	13	3	14	40	43	0.930	29	
13	Prishtina	30	12	4	14	37	40	0.925	28	
14	Jedinstvo Zemun (R)	30	10	7	13	51	56	0.911	27	Relegation to Third Level
15	OFK Subotica (R)	30	7	3	20	32	70	0.457	17	Relegation to Third Level
16	Radnički Sombor (R)	30	4	8	18	41	80	0.513	16	Relegation to Third Level

Source: fsgzrenjanin.com
Rules for classification: 1st points; 2nd goal average
(C) Champions; (P) Promoted; (R) Relegated

== See also ==
- 1963–64 Yugoslav First League
- 1963–64 Yugoslav Cup
