= 1960–61 Yugoslav Cup =

1960–61 Yugoslav Football Cup
14th Marshal Tito Cup

Tournament details
- Country: Yugoslavia
- Dates: 10 December 1960 – 28 May 1961
- Teams: 32

Final positions
- Champions: Vardar (1st title)
- Runners-up: Varteks

Tournament statistics
- Matches played: 31

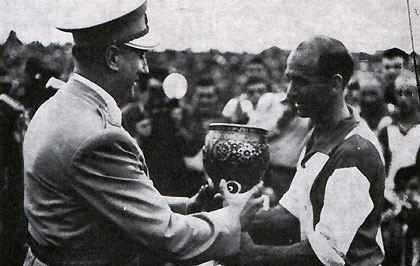
Nikola Ljubičić presents the Yugoslav Cup trophy to Slavko Dačevski, captain of FK Vardar, following their victory in the 1960–61 Yugoslav Cup football tournament.

The 1960–61 Yugoslav Cup was the 14th season of the top football knockout competition in SFR Yugoslavia, the Yugoslav Cup (Serbo-Croatian: Kup Jugoslavije), also known as the "Marshal Tito Cup" (Kup Maršala Tita), since its establishment in 1947.

== Calendar ==
The Yugoslav Cup was a tournament for which clubs from all tiers of the football pyramid were eligible to enter. In addition, amateur teams put together by individual Yugoslav People's Army garrisons and various factories and industrial plants were also encouraged to enter, which meant that each cup edition could have several thousands of teams in its preliminary stages. These teams would play through a number of qualifying rounds before reaching the first round proper, in which they would be paired with top-flight teams.

The cup final was played on 28 May, traditionally scheduled to coincide with Youth Day celebrated on 25 May, a national holiday in Yugoslavia which also doubled as the official commemoration of Josip Broz Tito's birthday.

Round	Legs	Date played	Fixtures	Clubs
First round (round of 32)	Single	10–11 December 1960	16	32 → 16
Second round (round of 16)	Single	18 December 1960	8	16 → 8
Quarter-finals	Single	26 February 1961	4	8 → 4
Semi-finals	Single	5 March 1961	2	4 → 2
Final	Single	28 May 1961	1	2 → 1

== First round ==
In the following tables winning teams are marked in bold; teams from outside top level are marked in italic script.

Tie no	Home team	Score	Away team
1	**Borovo**	2–0	Trešnjevka
2	Jedinstvo Bihać	1–2	**Borac Banja Luka**
3	Jedinstvo Bijelo Polje	1–2	**Vardar**
4	Mačva Šabac	0–3	**Hajduk Split**
5	ŽŠD Maribor	0–4	**Red Star**
6	**OFK Belgrade**	5–2	Radnički Sombor
7	**Partizan**	3–1	Budućnost Titograd
8	**Proleter Osijek**	2–1 (a.e.t.)	Novi Sad
9	**Rabotnički**	3–2	Rijeka
10	**Radnički Belgrade**	2–0	Spartak Subotica
11	**Sloboda Tuzla**	2–2 (4–2 p)	Vojvodina
12	**Sloga Kraljevo**	6–4	Pobeda Prilep
13	**RNK Split**	3–2 (a.e.t.)	Sarajevo
14	**Šibenik**	3–1	Sutjeska Nikšić
15	**Varteks**	1–0	Željezničar Sarajevo
16	Velež	0–1	**Dinamo Zagreb**

== Second round ==
Tie no	Home team	Score	Away team
1	Borac Banja Luka	0–3	**Borovo**
2	**Hajduk Split**	1–0	Dinamo Zagreb
3	**Radnički Belgrade**	4–1	Sloga Kraljevo
4	Red Star	0–1	**Sloboda Tuzla**
5	**RNK Split**	1–0	OFK Belgrade
6	**Šibenik**	9–1	Rabotnički
7	**Vardar**	3–2	Partizan
8	**Varteks**	3–1	Proleter Osijek

== Quarter-finals ==
Tie no	Home team	Score	Away team
1	Borovo	0–1	**Varteks**
2	**Hajduk Split**	4–3	Šibenik
3	Sloboda Tuzla	1–4	**RNK Split**
4	**Vardar**	4–1	Radnički Belgrade

== Semi-finals ==
Tie no	Home team	Score	Away team
1	**Vardar**	5–2	RNK Split
2	**Varteks**	2–0 (a.e.t.)	Hajduk Split

== Final ==
28 May 1961

Vardar	2–1	Varteks
Nikolovski 50'; Ilijevski 53'		Pikl 59'

Stadion JNA, Belgrade
Attendance: 15,000
Referee: Božo Stanišić (Sarajevo)

VARDAR:
GK	1	(Socialist Federal Republic of Yugoslavia) Tode Georgijevski
	2	(Socialist Federal Republic of Yugoslavia) Blagoja Vučidolov
	3	(Socialist Federal Republic of Yugoslavia) Petar Anđušev
	4	(Socialist Federal Republic of Yugoslavia) Slavko Dačevski
	5	(Socialist Federal Republic of Yugoslavia) Časlav Božinovski
	6	(Socialist Federal Republic of Yugoslavia) Dragan Trajčevski
	7	(Socialist Federal Republic of Yugoslavia) Mirko Ilijevski
	8	(Socialist Federal Republic of Yugoslavia) Vladimir Nikolovski
	9	(Socialist Federal Republic of Yugoslavia) Stojan Velkovski
	10	(Socialist Federal Republic of Yugoslavia) Andon Dončevski
	11	(Socialist Federal Republic of Yugoslavia) Petar Šulinčevski
Manager:
(Hungary) Antal Lyka

VARTEKS:
GK	(Socialist Federal Republic of Yugoslavia) Blaž Jurec
(Socialist Federal Republic of Yugoslavia) Stanko Crnković	Substituted off
(Socialist Federal Republic of Yugoslavia) Josip Matković
(Socialist Federal Republic of Yugoslavia) Rihard Rojnik
(Socialist Federal Republic of Yugoslavia) Antun Rodik
(Socialist Federal Republic of Yugoslavia) Aleksandar Krleža
(Socialist Federal Republic of Yugoslavia) Damir Hrain
(Socialist Federal Republic of Yugoslavia) Ivan Pikl
(Socialist Federal Republic of Yugoslavia) Ivan Pintarić
(Socialist Federal Republic of Yugoslavia) Karlo Sviben
(Socialist Federal Republic of Yugoslavia) Franjo Frančeškin
Substitutes:
(Socialist Federal Republic of Yugoslavia) Vlado Čuhelj	Substituted on
Manager:
(Socialist Federal Republic of Yugoslavia) Ivan Jazbinšek

== See also ==
- 1960–61 Yugoslav First League
- 1960–61 Yugoslav Second League
