= Uroš Tegeltija =

Serbian footballer (born 2006)

Personal information
- Full name: Uroš Tegeltija
- Date of birth: 19 March 2006 (age 20)
- Place of birth: Novi Sad, Serbia and Montenegro
- Height: 1.75 m (5 ft 9 in)
- Position: Right-back

Team information
- Current team: Železničar Pančevo
- Number: 19

Youth career
- 2019–2022: Čukarički
- 2022–2025: Red Star Belgrade

Senior career*
Years	Team	Apps	(Gls)
2025	Red Star Belgrade	0	(0)
2025–	Železničar Pančevo	16	(0)

International career^{‡}
2022	Serbia U16	3	(0)
2022	Serbia U17	8	(1)
2023–	Serbia U18	1	(0)
- * Club domestic league appearances and goals as of 12 June 2026 ‡ National team caps and goals as of 7 September 2023

Uroš Tegeltija (Serbian Cyrillic: Урош Тегелтија, born 19 March 2006) is a Serbian professional footballer who plays as a right-back for Železničar Pančevo.

== Club career ==
Born in Novi Sad, Serbia, Uroš and his twin brother Dragan at 2019 both started training at the Čukarički youth football school, From there, in 2022, they also went together to Red Star Belgrade where they both of them sign them first professional contracts.

Due to the insufficient number of players in training, due to the national team term, coach Vladan Milojević joined the work with the first team in March 2025 with 12 players from the youth team, including Tegeltija. He sat on the bench in the round of 16 match of the Serbian Cup with OFK Beograd, and made his debut in the 83rd minute when he entered the game together with Ognjen Teofilović. They replaced Strahinja Stojković and Bruno Duarte on the field.

== International career ==
He played for the Serbian national teams at U16, U17 and U18 levels.

== Personal life ==
Uroš's twin brother Dragan is also a professional footballer who plays on loan from Red Star Belgrade in OFK Beograd U19 youth team.

== Career statistics ==
As of match played 26 March 2025

Appearances and goals by club, season and competition
Club	Season	League			Cup		Europe		Other		Total	
Club	Season	Division	Apps	Goals	Apps	Goals	Apps	Goals	Apps	Goals	Apps	Goals
Red Star Belgrade	2024–25	Serbian SuperLiga	0	0	1	0	—		—		1	0
Red Star Belgrade	2025–26	Serbian SuperLiga	0	0	0	0	0	0	—		0	0
Career total			0	0	1	0	0	0	0	0	1	0
