= Ivan Fileš =

Yugoslav footballer

Personal information
- Full name: Ivan Fileš
- Date of birth: 23 April 1961 (age 65)
- Place of birth: Čakovec, SFR Yugoslavia
- Position: Midfielder

Senior career*
Years	Team	Apps	(Gls)
1979–1983	Varteks		
1983–1984	Red Star Belgrade	0	(0)
1984–1989	Čelik Zenica	137	(20)
1989–1990	Guingamp	28	(5)
- * Club domestic league appearances and goals

Ivan Fileš (born 23 April 1961) is a retired professional footballer who played for clubs in former Yugoslavia and France.

== Club career ==
In the 1983–84 season, after a good display in Varteks jersey previous season, he was signed by Yugoslav powerhouse Red Star Belgrade but he did not make a single appearance in the league so he left for Zenica where he stayed for the next five years and became an integral part of Čelik's team that got promoted and remained in top flight.
