= Aleksandar Vlahović =

Montenegrin footballer (born 1969)

Personal information
- Date of birth: 24 July 1969 (age 57)
- Place of birth: SFR Yugoslavia
- Position: Forward

Senior career*
Years	Team	Apps	(Gls)
- Budućnost Podgorica
- Sutjeska Nikšić
1993–1994	Red Star Belgrade		
1993	→ Hajduk Kula (loan)		
1994	Hammarby	10	(4)
1994–1995	Panionios	8	(0)
1997	Daewoo Royals	0	(0)
- * Club domestic league appearances and goals

Aleksandar Vlahović (born 24 July 1969) is a retired Montenegrin footballer who played as a forward.

== Club career ==
Vlahović began his senior career with Sutjeska Nikšić at the age of 17, and later played for Red Star Belgrade during the 1993–94 season.

In 1994, he joined Hammarby IF for the 1994 Allsvenskan season.

He played for Busan Daewoo Royals during the 1997 season in K League.
