= Fábio Silva (footballer, born 1980) =

Brazilian footballer

Personal information
- Full name: Fábio Carleandro da Silva
- Date of birth: 28 February 1980 (age 46)
- Place of birth: Capela, Brazil
- Height: 1.86 m (6 ft 1 in)
- Position: Defender

Team information
- Current team: Hajduk Beograd

Youth career
- Sport Recife

Senior career*
Years	Team	Apps	(Gls)
2001	Campinense		
2001	Treze		
2002	Rio Branco-AC		
2002–2005	Rad	47	(2)
2005–2007	Red Star Belgrade	0	(0)
2007	→ Rad (loan)	11	(1)
2007	→ Napredak Kruševac (loan)	9	(0)
2008	Náutico		
2009	Rio Branco-AC		
2009	San Jose Earthquakes	0	(0)
2011	União Rondonópolis		
2012	Cerâmica	0	(0)
2013	Goianésia	6	(0)
2013	CRAC-GO	8	(0)
2014	Goianésia	0	(0)
2014	CRAC-GO	17	(0)
2015	Trindade	0	(0)
2015–2016	CRAC-GO	5	(0)
2017	Goianésia	0	(0)
2017	Central	6	(0)
2021–2023	Hajduk Beograd	45	(5)
- * Club domestic league appearances and goals

Fábio Carleandro da Silva (born 28 February 1980) is a Brazilian former professional footballer who played as a defender.

== Career ==
In late 2002, Fábio moved to Europe and joined First League of FR Yugoslavia side Rad. He spent three seasons with the Građevinari (the latter two in the Second League), before transferring to Red Star Belgrade in August 2005. In the first half of his debut season with the Crveno-beli, Fábio made two appearances in the Serbia and Montenegro Cup, but was deemed surplus to requirements during the winter break. He later went on loan to Rad and Napredak Kruševac.

In January 2008, Fábio returned to Brazil and signed with Náutico. He subsequently played for his former club Rio Branco-AC. In August 2009, Fábio was signed by Major League Soccer side San Jose Earthquakes, but was let go the next month.

After returning to Brazil, Fábio played for União Rondonópolis, Cerâmica, Goianésia, CRAC-GO, Trindade and Central.
