= Duško Tomić =

Serbian football player and coach (1958–2017)

Personal information
- Full name: Dušan Tomić
- Date of birth: 14 August 1958
- Place of birth: Ruma, FPR Yugoslavia
- Date of death: 22 April 2017 (aged 58)
- Position: Goalkeeper

Senior career*
Years	Team	Apps	(Gls)
1978–1979	Budućnost Peć	1	(0)
1979–1980	Rudar Velenje	11	(0)
1981–1984	Teteks Tetovo	36	(0)
1984–1985	Trepča	11	(0)
1986–1987	Maribor		
1987–1988	Radnički Niš	9	(0)
1988–1990	OFK Kikinda	31	(0)
1990–1991	OFK Beograd	13	(0)
1991–1993	Teteks Tetovo		
1993–1994	Borac Čačak		

International career
1976	Yugoslavia Olympic		

Managerial career
- 1994–1996: Teteks Tetovo
- 1996–1997: Ljuboten
- 1997–1999: Egaleo (gk coach)
- 1999–2001: FR Yugoslavia U-21 (gk coach)
- 2001–2002: China (gk coach)
- 2003–2009: Beijing Guoan (gk coach)
- 2010: Shenzhen Ruby (gk coach)
- 2011–2014: Guizhou Renhe (gk coach)
- * Club domestic league appearances and goals

Duško Tomić (Serbian Cyrillic: Душко Томић, 14 August 1958 – 22 April 2017) was a Serbian football coach and goalkeeper.

Born in Ruma, as a goalkeeper he defended for a number of clubs in the Yugoslav First League.

On 22 April 2017, Tomić died of acute leukemia, aged 58.
