= Slavko Dacevski =

Macedonian footballer and manager

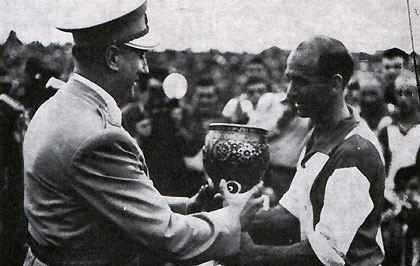

Personal information
- Full name: Slavko Dacevski
- Date of birth: 9 July 1930
- Place of birth: Skopje
- Positions: Defender; defensive midfielder

Youth career
- 1947–1950: Vardar

Senior career*
Years	Team	Apps	(Gls)
1950–1955	Vardar	113	(3)
1956	Red Star Belgrade	0	(0)
1957–1960	Budućnost Titograd	74	(0)
1960–1965	Vardar	87	(1)
1965	SSC Yugal	16	(2)

International career
1958	Yugoslavia B	4	(0)

Managerial career
- 1972: SSC Yugal
- 1974: SSC Yugal
- 1975: Preston Lions
- * Club domestic league appearances and goals

Slavko Dacevski (Macedonian: Славко Дацевски, born 9 July 1930) was a Macedonian football player and manager.

== Club career ==
Born in Skopje, Vardarska Banovina, he started playing in the youth team of FK Vardar having become Yugoslav youth champion in 1949. He debuted for the senior team of Vardar in the season 1950. In 1955 he joined Red Star Belgrade, but failed to debut in the league, played just one game in the Yugoslav Cup, so he moved to FK Budućnost Titograd where he played between 1957 and 1960. Then he returned to Vardar and played until 1965, having won with them the 1960–61 Yugoslav Cup having played in the final as a captain.

That year he moved to Australia and joined SSC Yugal in the 1965 season. He will later coach them in 1972 and 1974, and also coached Preston Lions FC in 1975.

== International career ==
He played 4 matches for the Yugoslav B national team, all of them in 1958.
