= Willians (footballer, born 1973) =

Brazilian footballer

Personal information
- Full name: Willians Bartolomeu dos Santos
- Date of birth: 20 April 1973 (age 53)
- Place of birth: Sergipe, Brazil
- Position: Forward

Senior career*
Years	Team	Apps	(Gls)
–1998	Presidense		
1998	Red Star Belgrade	7	(2)
1999	Proodeftiki	3	(0)
2006–2007	Hòa Phát Hà Nội		
2008	Khatoco Khánh Hòa		
2009	XSKT Cần Thơ		
2010	Hải Phòng		
- * Club domestic league appearances and goals

Willians Bartolomeu dos Santos, known as Willians (born 20 April 1973) is a Brazilian former professional footballer who played as a forward.

== Career ==
Willians arrived to Serbia in summer 1998 along his compatriot Adilson dos Santos and Fumaça, and signed with Red Star Belgrade. He played with Presidense in Brazil. He made 7 appearances and scored twice in the 1998–99 First League of FR Yugoslavia.

He left Red Star in December and joined Greek club Proodeftiki F.C. He made 3 appearances in the 1998–99 Alpha Ethniki

Later, between 2006 and 2010, he played in Vietnam, with Hòa Phát Hà Nội, Khatoco Khánh Hòa, XSKT Cần Thơ and Hải Phòng.

== Honors ==
Red Star Belgrade

- FR Yugoslavia Cup: 1999
