= Vladimir Nikolovski =

Association football player

Vlado Nikolovski
Personal information
- Full name: Vladimir Nikolovski
- Date of birth: 25 August 1936
- Place of birth: Skopje, Kingdom of Yugoslavia
- Date of death: 2010 (aged 73–74)
- Position: Striker

Youth career
- 1950–1954: Vardar

Senior career*
Years	Team	Apps	(Gls)
1954–1958	Vardar	77	(27)
1958–1960	Red Star Belgrade	6	(1)
1960–1963	Vardar	33	(9)
1966–1968	Galatasaray	4	(0)

International career
1957	Yugoslavia B	1	(0)
- * Club domestic league appearances and goals

Vladimir "Vlado" Nikolovski (Macedonian: Владимир "Владо" Николовски, born 25 August 1936) is a former Macedonian footballer. He became known as the first in a long line of Macedonian players to play for Red Star Belgrade.

== Club career ==
Born in Skopje, Republic of Macedonia, he began playing with the FK Vardar youth team in 1950. later being incorporated into the first team of Vardar in 1954. As a talented youngster, he came to the Yugoslav capital Belgrade in 1958 to join the Red Star Belgrade. He stayed on Red Star two seasons, and despite being a promising forward, made only six appearances and scored one goal in the Yugoslav First League. However, the time he spent there were golden years for the team, with Red Star winning two consecutive championships, in 1959 and 1960, and the Yugoslav Cup in 1959 (his first season he won the double). He played alongside great names of Yugoslav football such as Dragoslav Šekularac, Bora Kostić, Vladimir Beara, Vladimir Durković, Miljan Zeković, Ljubomir Spajić, Vladica Popović, Lazar Tasić, Ivan Toplak, Anton Rudinski, and it was consequently very hard for him to find a place in the starting eleven.

Nikolovski returned to Vardar, which was a productive move. It meant a continuation of winning national trophies, with Vardar winning the 1960–61 Yugoslav Cup, and Nikolovski scoring the opening goal of the 2–1 victory in the championship game. He became one of the legendary players of Vardar.

In 1966, in a transfer worth 40,000 British pounds, Nikolovski signed with Turkish giant Galatasaray, becoming their first foreigner since the club became professional. It ended up being a bad move for Nikolovski since he managed to play only four games in the Süper Lig and one in the Turkish Cup.

After returning from Turkey he retired from his playing career, and became director at a supermarket at Skopje.

== International career ==
Nikolovski played one game for Yugoslav national B team, in Skopje on 29 September 1957, against Romania.

He died in 2010.

== Honours ==
Red Star Belgrade

- Yugoslav First League: 1958–59 and 1959–60
- Yugoslav Cup: 1959

Vardar

- Yugoslav Cup: 1961

Galatasaray

- Turkish Cup: 1966
