= Aleksandar Marković (footballer, born 1945) =

Aleksandar "Saša" Marković
Senior career*
Years	Team	Apps	(Gls)
1964–1971	Red Star Belgrade	168	(16)
1971–1976	FK Rad		
- * Club domestic league appearances and goals

Aleksandar "Saša" Marković (1945–2025) was a Serbian football player and the former president of Red Star Belgrade's veteran player section.

== Early Life ==
His father, Stevan Marković was also a football player, of the pre-World War II club, BSK Belgrade.

== Club Career ==
Marković was part of the youth team of Red Star Belgrade, and later of the first team, for which he appeared in 168 games, scoring 16 goals. He later played for FK Rad, scoring a career total of 168 goals.

== Later Career ==
Marković was the member and later president of the Red Star Belgrade's veteran player section.
