= Zoran Prljinčević =

Yugoslav footballer (1932–2013)

Personal information
- Date of birth: 27 January 1932
- Place of birth: Pristina, Kingdom of Yugoslavia
- Date of death: 13 June 2013 (aged 81)
- Place of death: Belgrade, Serbia
- Position: Striker

Senior career*
| Years | Team | Apps | (Gls) |
| 1951 | Radnički Belgrade | 24 | (13) |
| 1953–1954 | BSK Belgrade | 18 | (11) |
| 1954–1962 | Radnički Belgrade | 147 | (93) |
| 1961 | → Red Star Belgrade (loan) | 0 | (0) |
| 1962–1965 | Red Star Belgrade | 51 | (30) |
| 1966–1967 | Radnički Belgrade | 9 | (1) |
| Total | | 249 | (148) |
- * Club domestic league appearances and goals

Zoran Prljinčević (Serbian Cyrillic: Зоран Прљинчевић; 27 January 1932 – 13 June 2013) was a Yugoslav professional footballer who played as a striker.

== Career ==
Prljinčević spent most of his career with Radnički Belgrade, including seven seasons in the Yugoslav First League between 1954 and 1961. He was the league's joint top scorer in 1960–61, alongside Todor Veselinović, with 16 goals, but was unable to help keep his club in the top flight. Despite relegation to the Second League, Prljinčević remained at the club in the 1961–62 season, but also played that fall as a guest for Red Star Belgrade against Hibernian in the return leg of the Inter-Cities Fairs Cup second round, scoring the only goal in a 1–0 away victory. He permanently joined Red Star Belgrade in the summer of 1962, spending the next three years there. In the 1963–64 season, Prljinčević was the team's top scorer across all competitions, helping them win the double.

== Career statistics ==
Appearances and goals by club, season and competition
| Club | Season | League | | |
| Club | Season | Division | Apps | Goals |
|---|---|---|---|---|
| Radnički Belgrade | 1951 | Yugoslav Second League | 24 | 13 |
| BSK Belgrade | 1953–54 | Yugoslav First League | 18 | 11 |
| Radnički Belgrade | 1954–55 | Yugoslav First League | 13 | 6 |
| Radnički Belgrade | 1955–56 | Yugoslav First League | 25 | 20 |
| Radnički Belgrade | 1956–57 | Yugoslav First League | 25 | 17 |
| Radnički Belgrade | 1957–58 | Yugoslav First League | 26 | 12 |
| Radnički Belgrade | 1958–59 | Yugoslav First League | 11 | 8 |
| Radnički Belgrade | 1959–60 | Yugoslav First League | 11 | 8 |
| Radnički Belgrade | 1960–61 | Yugoslav First League | 19 | 16 |
| Radnički Belgrade | 1961–62 | Yugoslav Second League | 17 | 6 |
| Radnički Belgrade | Total | | 147 | 93 |
| Red Star Belgrade | 1962–63 | Yugoslav First League | 7 | 3 |
| Red Star Belgrade | 1963–64 | Yugoslav First League | 22 | 15 |
| Red Star Belgrade | 1964–65 | Yugoslav First League | 22 | 12 |
| Red Star Belgrade | Total | | 51 | 30 |
| Radnički Belgrade | 1966–67 | Yugoslav Second League | 9 | 1 |
| Career total | | | 249 | 148 |

== Honours ==
BSK Belgrade

- Yugoslav Cup: 1953

Radnički Belgrade

- Yugoslav Cup runner-up: 1956–57

Red Star Belgrade

- Yugoslav First League: 1963–64
- Yugoslav Cup: 1963–64

Individual

- Yugoslav First League top scorer: 1960–61
