= 1963–64 Yugoslav First League =

Prva savezna liga
- Season: 1963–64
- Dates: 18 August 1963 – 14 June 1964
- Champions: Red Star (7th title)
- Relegated: FK Novi Sad
- European Cup: Red Star
- Cup Winners' Cup: Dinamo Zagreb
- Inter-Cities Fairs Cup: OFK Beograd; Vojvodina
- Goals: 522
- Average goals/game: 2,87
- Top goalscorer: Asim Ferhatović (19)

The 1963–64 Yugoslav First League season was the 18th season of the First Federal League (Serbo-Croatian: Prva savezna liga), the top level football league of SFR Yugoslavia, since its establishment in 1946. Fourteen teams contested the competition, with Red Star winning their 7th title.

== Teams ==
At the end of the previous season Sloboda and Budućnost were relegated. They were replaced by Vardar and Trešnjevka.

Team	Location	Federal Republic	Position in 1962–63
Dinamo Zagreb	Zagreb	SR Croatia	2nd
Hajduk Split	Split	SR Croatia	11th
FK Novi Sad	Novi Sad	SR Serbia	8th
OFK Belgrade	Belgrade	SR Serbia	5th
Partizan	Belgrade	SR Serbia	1st
Radnički Niš	Niš	SR Serbia	6th
Red Star	Belgrade	SR Serbia	7th
Rijeka	Rijeka	SR Croatia	10th
Sarajevo	Sarajevo	SR Bosnia and Herzegovina	9th
Trešnjevka	Zagreb	SR Croatia	—N/a
Vardar	Skopje	SR Macedonia	—N/a
Velež	Mostar	SR Bosnia and Herzegovina	4th
Vojvodina	Novi Sad	SR Serbia	12th
Željezničar	Sarajevo	SR Bosnia and Herzegovina	3rd

== League table ==
Pos	Team	Pld	W	D	L	GF	GA	GD	Pts	Qualification or relegation
1	Red Star Belgrade (C)	26	14	8	4	45	22	+23	36	Qualification for European Cup preliminary round
2	OFK Belgrade	26	11	11	4	49	32	+17	33	Invitation for Inter-Cities Fairs Cup first round
3	Dinamo Zagreb	26	12	9	5	40	29	+11	33	Qualification for Cup Winners' Cup first round
4	Sarajevo	26	11	7	8	47	37	+10	29	
5	Partizan	26	9	8	9	34	26	+8	26	
6	Željezničar	26	8	10	8	37	43	−6	26	
7	Vojvodina	26	9	6	11	34	31	+3	24	Invitation for Inter-Cities Fairs Cup first round
8	Radnički Niš	26	10	4	12	33	34	−1	24	
9	Rijeka	26	7	10	9	37	42	−5	24	
10	Hajduk Split	26	9	5	12	44	44	0	23	
11	Trešnjevka	26	9	5	12	34	54	−20	23	
12	Velež	26	5	12	9	30	41	−11	22	
13	Novi Sad (R)	26	7	7	12	30	52	−22	21	Relegation to Yugoslav Second League (Note: Despite getting relegated based on the results, it was decided that FK Vardar would be allowed to remain in the top-flight Yugoslav First League the following season due to the devastating earthquake that hit Skopje in July 1963. The thinking on the part of Yugoslav politicians was that having a team in the top-tier league would be a boost to the morale of inhabitants of Skopje.)
14	Vardar	26	6	8	12	28	35	−7	20	Relegation to Yugoslav Second League

Source: rsssf.org
Rules for classification: 1) points; 2) goal difference; 3) number of goals scored.
(C) Champions; (R) Relegated

== Results ==
Home \ Away	DIN	HAJ	NSD	OFK	PAR	RNI	RSB	RIJ	SAR	TRE	VAR	VEL	VOJ	ŽEL
Dinamo Zagreb		3–0	1–0	3–1	1–0	0–2	0–0	1–0	3–2	4–2	0–0	1–1	1–0	3–3
Hajduk Split	1–1		2–1	2–3	0–0	0–1	3–2	3–0	1–1	6–2	0–1	4–0	1–0	4–0
Novi Sad	1–3	0–4		3–3	2–1	2–0	2–2	0–0	1–1	0–2	2–1	2–2	0–0	2–0
OFK Belgrade	3–1	6–3	6–2		1–1	3–1	0–0	2–2	2–2	2–1	2–1	1–1	3–0	0–1
Partizan	1–1	3–0	1–0	0–2		3–0	0–2	0–1	0–0	7–0	2–2	0–0	3–1	1–2
Radnički Niš	2–0	4–2	3–1	1–0	4–1		0–3	0–1	4–0	3–3	1–0	1–1	0–1	0–0
Red Star	3–0	1–1	6–1	1–1	1–0	2–1		2–1	2–0	0–0	3–1	2–0	2–1	3–1
Rijeka	0–3	1–1	6–0	2–2	2–4	1–2	1–0		2–4	3–0	1–1	4–2	2–1	1–1
Sarajevo	2–1	2–0	3–0	0–0	3–0	2–1	2–3	5–2		3–0	2–1	4–1	1–1	4–1
Trešnjevka	0–2	3–2	2–0	2–3	0–0	1–0	2–3	1–1	2–1		1–0	2–1	1–0	0–2
Vardar	1–1	1–2	0–3	1–1	0–1	1–0	1–0	0–0	2–0	2–3		4–1	2–2	3–1
Velež	3–3	1–0	0–0	0–0	1–2	3–1	0–0	1–1	2–1	1–0	3–0		2–2	2–3
Vojvodina	0–2	4–0	1–2	0–2	0–3	2–0	0–0	4–0	4–1	5–1	2–1	0–0		2–1
Željezničar	1–1	3–2	2–3	1–0	0–0	1–1	3–2	2–2	1–1	3–3	1–1	3–1	0–1	

Source: DataSoccer.it
Legend: Blue = home team win; Yellow = draw; Red = away team win.

== Top scorers ==
Rank	Player	Club	Goals
1	(Socialist Federal Republic of Yugoslavia) Asim Ferhatović	Sarajevo	19
2	(Socialist Federal Republic of Yugoslavia) Josip Skoblar	OFK Belgrade	16
2	(Socialist Federal Republic of Yugoslavia) Vladica Kovačević	Partizan	16
4	(Socialist Federal Republic of Yugoslavia) Zoran Prljinčević	Red Star	15
5	(Socialist Federal Republic of Yugoslavia) Borivoje Kostić	Red Star	14
5	(Socialist Federal Republic of Yugoslavia) Slaven Zambata	Dinamo Zagreb	14
5	(Socialist Federal Republic of Yugoslavia) Mišo Smajlović	Željezničar	14
5	(Socialist Federal Republic of Yugoslavia) Ivan Hlevnjak	Hajduk Split	14
5	(Socialist Federal Republic of Yugoslavia) Andrija Anković	Hajduk Split	14
5	(Socialist Federal Republic of Yugoslavia) Stevan Ostojić	Radnički Niš	14

== The Planinić Affair ==
In August 1965, at the beginning of the 1965-66 season—fourteen months after the end of the 1963-64 season when the alleged transgressions had taken place—FK Željezničar goalkeeper Ranko Planinić came forward with information alleging match-fixing. He claimed that towards the end of the season his club threw its league matches against Hajduk Split and NK Trešnjevka in exchange for monetary payouts, which the two relegation-threatened teams decided to pay in order to help themselves avoid the drop to the Yugoslav Second League. Specifically, Planinić claimed that the match played on 31 May 1964 in Split—Hajduk's 4-0 win over Željezničar—was fixed, as well as the following week's match on 7 June 1964 in Sarajevo that saw Željezničar and visiting Trešnjevka play to a 3-3 draw. He was in Željezničar's goal in both matches.

Planinić made the information public in August 1965, fourteen months after the fact, by approaching a Večernje novine journalist Alija Resulović who in turn took Planinić's testimony in form of an interview that was published by the paper with circulation of 100,000 copies at the time. In his 2006 book Ona vremena, Resulović claims to have contacted FK Željezničar's president Nusret Mahić right before submitting the piece for publishing, informing him of Planinić's allegations, seeking comment, and even offering to sit on the information if he (Mahić) thinks it necessary. Resulović further claims that Mahić's response was: "Publish it all! It's all a lie that Planinić concocted as revenge after being fined for a training session incident he had caused".

The explosive testimony erupted in a nationwide scandal that would become known as the 'Planinić Affair'. In the years prior, on multiple occasions, Yugoslav First League had been plagued by rumours of widespread match-fixing, however, this was the first instance of a player coming forward as whistleblower and substantiating those claims on the record.

=== Investigation ===
Right after Planinić's allegations hit the press, the Yugoslav FA (FSJ) disciplinary body (disciplinski sud) began an investigation into the two matches Planinić claimed were fixed. Its findings were summarized in an internal memo that was later obtained by various Yugoslav press outlets:

NK Hajduk Split vs. FK Željezničar Sarajevo played on Sunday, 31 May 1964

Several days before the fixture, NK Hajduk managing board member Zdravko Arapović phoned Jakov Brdar, a Zenica-based administrator, in order to ask him to immediately travel to Sarajevo and find someone on the FK Željezničar managing board willing to negotiate a match-fixing deal for the upcoming league fixture between the two teams. As requested, Brdar went to Sarajevo and met up with Ante Dervišević, an FK Željezničar managing board member he had known from before. Since he had no authority to make a decision of this sort, Dervišević referred Brdar to the FK Željezničar club president Nusret Mahić and the two met in club offices where Brdar relayed Zdravko Arapović's offer.

Mahić flatly rejected Arapović's offer, as relayed to him by Brdar, due to its suggestion of a friendly gesture on FK Željezničar's part without any monetary compensation, reacting to it by saying: 'No money—no deal'. Prodded by Brdar to name the figure he'd expect in return for letting Hajduk win, Mahić responded: 'Two and a half million, at least YUD2.5 million'. Brdar then went to Split to inform Arapović of Mahić's demands.

The day before the match, right after FK Željezničar's arrival to Split, Arapović met with Ljubomir Nikolić, another member of FK Željezničar's managing board, who was in charge of organizing the club's away trip to Split. On this occasion, Nikolić demanded YUD4 million to throw the match — 2 million in cash and the other 2 million as advertising money for FK Željezničar's newsletter/magazine that Hajduk would line up from Split-based companies. Arapović's response to Nikolić was that he'll get back to him tomorrow on the day of the match as he has to consult with someone.

Right before the match, as the two teams were already conducting warm-ups on the pitch, Arapović invited Nikolić into the office of Hajduk's financial officer where he asked Nikolić to lower the price. After haggling over the amount for some time, Nikolić conceded and agreed on the sum of YUD1.5 million as Željezničar's compensation. At that point, Arapović took YUD1 million in cash from Hajduk's financial officer Ante Vidošević and handed it to Nikolić. According to Vidošević's testimony, this million came from the club's 'black fund' while he obtained the remaining YUD500,000 on the very day of the match from his assistants who were in charge of selling match tickets at the gate.

As soon as he received the agreed-upon amount of YUD1.5 million, Nikolić went down to the bench in order to inform Željezničar's head coach Vlatko Konjevod that the money had been collected. Konjevod, in turn, went to the touchline and communicated with his players Ivica Osim and Mišo Smajlović via a hand gesture, a previously agreed signal between the three that meant the players should start letting the opponent win.

Right after receiving head coach Konjevod's signal, Osim and Smajlović began intentionally sabotaging their own team's play, which became obvious to all of the protagonists on the pitch to the point of causing a revolt among the rest of Željezničar's squad with Rade Matić even physically accosting Osim during the match over his obvious lack of trying. Hajduk won easily 4-0.

Days earlier, before Željezničar's players and management departed Sarajevo for the away league match versus Hajduk, club president Nusret Mahić instructed the club's managing board member Ljubomir Nikolić how to go about arranging the match-fixing once he arrives in Split and how much money to ask for. Mahić furthermore told Nikolić to give him a phone call once the job is done, which Nikolić did. It has been further determined through Zdravko Arapović's testimony that he acted at the behest of Hajduk's club president Josip Košto and the rest of the club's managing board. Arapović further testified that he also agreed the match-fixing with the head coaches of the two clubs — Željezničar's Konjevod and Hajduk's Milovan Ćirić — with both aware of the amount that was paid out.

It is also worth noting that Hajduk's managing board members Ivo Mimica, Frane Marković, Ante Vidošević, and Željko Vladović were present when Hajduk's club president Josip Košto instructed Arapović to pay YUD1.5 million to Nikolić. Furthermore, Željezničar's managing board member Edhem Tufo was aware of all the match-fixing details from the very beginning of the deal and he even saw the cash that Nikolić showed him upon receiving it.

Taking the money in order to throw the match caused friction and antagonism among the Željezničar squad with certain players demanding a cut from club management during the return trip to Sarajevo. Due to widespread revolt in the team, club president Mahić called a meeting in Sarajevo the day after the match, attempting to explain to his players why the match had been thrown. He talked of "Hajduk's great contributions" as well as of "Hajduk's concessions to Željezničar several years ago". The amount of revolt among the players was reflected in Osim's words to club president Mahić: 'You can demand a lot of things from us players, but this thing that happened in Split — never again'.

=== Punishment ===
On 27 August 1965, the Yugoslav FA's disciplinary body (disciplinski sud) presided over by Svetozar Savić handed out the following penalties:

- FK Željezničar's board members, including club president Nusret Mahić, got lifelong bans on performing any football-related official functions.
- FK Željezničar's head coach at the time Vlatko Konjevod got a lifetime ban from football.
- FK Željezničar's players Ivica Osim and Mišo Smajlović each got a one-year ban from football.
- NK Hajduk Split's board members, including club president Josip Košto, got lifelong bans on performing any football-related official functions.
- NK Hajduk Split's head coach at the time Milovan Ćirić got a lifetime ban from football.
- Two members of NK Trešnjevka's board got lifelong bans on performing any football-related official functions.
- NK Trešnjevka's club president Ivan Bačun and technical director Marjan Matančić got disciplinary motions started against them.
- NK Dinamo Zagreb's general secretary Oto Hofman got a lifetime ban from football for acting as a go-between for Željezničar and Trešnjevka.

Disciplinary body president Svetozar Savić also announced that the investigation had revealed that Željezničar was paid YUD1.5 million by Hajduk Split, and YUD4 million by Trešnjevka for these matches. Some of the money Trešnjevka paid was obtained from the Zagreb Fair where some of Trešnjevka's board members were employed at. As a reference point, the price of a daily newspaper at the time was YUD40.

=== Appeals ===
On appeal, the main punishment for the three clubs was reduced to points-deduction. For the 1965-66 season, Željezničar, Hajduk, and Trešnjevka were docked 6, 5, and 5 points, respectively.

== See also ==
- 1963–64 Yugoslav Second League
- 1963–64 Yugoslav Cup
