= Dejan Bekić =

Serbian footballer

Personal information
- Full name: Dejan Bekić
- Date of birth: 8 September 1944
- Place of birth: Belgrade, Democratic Federal Yugoslavia
- Date of death: 23 November 1967 (aged 23)
- Place of death: Belgrade, SFR Yugoslavia
- Position: Defender

Senior career*
Years	Team	Apps	(Gls)
1962–1967	Red Star Belgrade	68	(3)
- * Club domestic league appearances and goals

Dejan Bekić (Serbian Cyrillic: Дејан Бекић; 8 September 1944 – 23 November 1967) was a Yugoslavian footballer. He died of cancer in the lymph nodes.
