= Aleksandar Radović (footballer) =

Montenegrin footballer

Personal information
- Full name: Aleksandar Radović
- Date of birth: 30 March 1987 (age 39)
- Place of birth: Pančevo, SFR Yugoslavia
- Height: 1.80 m (5 ft 11 in)
- Position: Defender

Youth career
- Red Star Belgrade

Senior career*
Years	Team	Apps	(Gls)
2003–2008	Red Star Belgrade	5	(0)
2003–2004	→ Kolubara (loan)	14	(0)
2005	→ Bečej (loan)	13	(0)
2006	→ Sopot (loan)	2	(0)
2006	→ Bečej (loan)	13	(0)
2006–2007	→ Vardar (loan)	2	(0)
2007	→ Kolubara (loan)	13	(0)
2007	→ Hajduk Belgrade (loan)	11	(0)
2008–2010	Budućnost Podgorica	10	
2010	Elbasani	9	(1)
2011	→ Rabotnički (loan)	5	
2011–2012	BSK Borča	9	(0)
2012	Dinamo Pančevo		
2013	Gaz Metan Mediaș	9	(0)
2013	Tiraspol	5	(0)
2014	CSMS Iași	16	(0)
2014	Olt Slatina	11	(0)
2015	Drina Zvornik	8	(0)
2016	Borac Sakule	13	(0)
2016–2017	Šumadija Aranđelovac		
2017–2018	Smederevo		
2020	Drina Zvornik		

International career^{‡}
2008	Montenegro U21	2	(0)
- * Club domestic league appearances and goals as of 1 July 2020 ‡ National team caps and goals as of 19 May 2010

Aleksandar Radović (Cyrillic: Александар Радовић; born 30 March 1987) is a Montenegrin retired footballer who played as a defender.

== Club career ==
Radović started playing football in Red Star Belgrade where he spent 10 years in youth squads and in 2007 was elected the best youth player. During that period he was loaned to Serbian Second League clubs FK Kolubara and FK Hajduk Beograd, and to Macedonian First League club FK Vardar.

In 2007, Radović signed a contract for FK Budućnost Podgorica where he stayed for two and a half seasons and played more than 20 matches.

In summer 2010, he moved to KF Elbasani where he played 9 matches in Albanian Superliga and 5 matches in Albanian Cup. During the winter break he was loaned to Macedonian First League club FK Rabotnički where he played the rest of the season.

In summer 2011 he returned to Serbia and signed with SuperLiga club FK BSK Borča.

After FK BSK Borča Radović moved to Gaz Metan Mediaș and played 9 matches. On August 7, 2013, he was presented as a new player of Tiraspol.

== International career ==
Internationally he played Montenegro national under-21 football team.

== Honours ==
Budućnost

- Montenegrin First League: 2007–08
