= Dušan Andrić =

Serbian footballer (born 1946)

Personal information
- Date of birth: 8 May 1946 (age 80)
- Place of birth: Zemun, Yugoslavia
- Position: Midfielder

Senior career*
Years	Team	Apps	(Gls)
1963–1966	Red Star Belgrade	14	(2)
1966–1969	Sutjeska		
1969–1970	Vojvodina	16	(0)
1970–1972	Spartak Subotica		
1975–1976	Wuppertaler SV	4	(0)
- * Club domestic league appearances and goals

Dušan Andrić (Serbian Cyrillic: Душан Андрић; born 8 May 1946) is a Serbian retired footballer who was best known as a midfielder of Red Star Belgrade in the 1960s.

== Club career ==
He played for Red Star between 1963 until 1966. He also played with FK Sutjeska Nikšić, FK Vojvodina and FK Spartak Subotica before moving abroad to play in Germany with Wuppertaler SV Borussia in the 2. Bundesliga in the 1975–76 season.
