= Slobodan Škrbić =

Serbian footballer (1944–2022)

Personal information
- Date of birth: 18 October 1944
- Place of birth: Belgrade, PR Serbia, DF Yugoslavia
- Date of death: 16 March 2022 (aged 77)
- Place of death: Belgrade, Serbia
- Position: Defender

Senior career*
Years	Team	Apps	(Gls)
1961–1971	Red Star Belgrade	86	(3)
1971–1972	Lille	6	(1)
Total		92	(4)

International career
1964	Yugoslavia	4	(0)
- * Club domestic league appearances and goals

Slobodan Škrbić (Serbian Cyrillic: Cлoбoдaн Шкpбић; 18 October 1944 – 16 March 2022) was a Serbian professional footballer who played as a defender for Red Star Belgrade and French club Lille. He made four appearances for the SFR Yugoslavia national team.

Škrbić died in Belgrade on 16 March 2022, at the age of 77.
