= Strahinja Stojković =

Serbian footballer (born 2007)

Personal information
- Date of birth: 8 March 2007 (age 19)
- Place of birth: Belgrade, Serbia
- Height: 1.88 m (6 ft 2 in)
- Position: Right-back

Team information
- Current team: OFK Beograd (on loan from Saint-Étienne)
- Number: 47

Youth career
- 2023–2025: Red Star Belgrade

Senior career*
Years	Team	Apps	(Gls)
2025	Red Star Belgrade	4	(0)
2025	→ Grafičar Beograd (dual)	7	(1)
2025–	Saint-Étienne B	17	(0)
2025–	Saint-Étienne	1	(0)
2026–	→ OFK Beograd (loan)	4	(0)

International career^{‡}
2021	Serbia U15	2	(0)
2022–2023	Serbia U16	5	(0)
2024–	Serbia U19	15	(0)
- * Club domestic league appearances and goals as of 13:43, 9 November 2026 (UTC) ‡ National team caps and goals as of 5 July 2026

Strahinja Stojković (Serbian Cyrillic: Страхиња Стојковић; born 8 March 2007) is a Serbian professional footballer who plays as a right-back for OFK Beograd, on loan from Ligue 2 club Saint-Étienne.

== Career ==
=== Red Star Belgrade ===
Strahinja completed the entire Red Star Belgrade Youth academy and is a member of one of the club's 21st century generations. He is a defender who plays as a right-back. He was a standard member of club's junior team during the 2024–25 UEFA Youth League competition.

On 3 January 2025, he was promoted to the first team from Red Star Belgrade U-19.

On 8 January 2025, he made his debut for the first team in a friendly match against Mura.

On 2 February 2025, he was first included in the "red-whites" application for the Serbian SuperLiga match against TSC, but did not appear on the field. On 2 March 2025, he came on as a substitute in Serbian SuperLiga match against IMT, making his official debut for Red Star Belgrade first team.

On 10 March 2025, he extended his contract with Red Star Belgrade until 2029.

=== Saint-Étienne ===
On 8 August 2025, Strahinja signed for Ligue 2 club Saint-Étienne on a four-year deal.

== Career statistics ==
As of match played 2 August 2025

Appearances and goals by club, season and competition
Club	Season	League			Cup		Europe		Total	
Club	Season	Division	Apps	Goals	Apps	Goals	Apps	Goals	Apps	Goals
Red Star Belgrade	2024–25	Serbian SuperLiga	4	0	2	0	—		6	0
Red Star Belgrade	2025–26	Serbian SuperLiga	0	0	0	0	0	0	0	0
Red Star Belgrade	Total		4	0	2	0	0	0	6	0
Grafičar Beograd (dual)	2024–25	Serbian First League	7	1	—		—		7	1
Career total			11	1	2	0	0	0	13	1
