= Živorad Jevtić =

Serbian footballer

Personal information
- Full name: Živorad Jevtić
- Date of birth: 27 December 1943
- Place of birth: Kruševac, Nazi-occupied Serbia
- Date of death: 8 August 2000 (aged 56)
- Place of death: Belgrade, Serbia, FR Yugoslavia
- Position: Defender

Senior career*
Years	Team	Apps	(Gls)
1962–1975	Red Star Belgrade	157	(3)

International career
1964–1969	Yugoslavia	14	(0)
1964	Yugoslavia XI	2	(0)
- * Club domestic league appearances and goals

Živorad Jevtić (27 December 1943 – 8 August 2000) was a Serbian footballer.

== International career ==
On the national level, Jevtić made his debut for Yugoslavia at the 1964 Summer Olympics against the United Team of Germany and earned a total of 16 caps (including 2 unofficial al that Tokyo Olympics). His final international was a September 1969 friendly match against the Soviet Union.
