= 1978–79 Red Star Belgrade season =

Red Star Belgrade
1978–79 season
- Chairman: Radovan Pantović
- Manager: Branko Stanković
- Yugoslav First League: 3rd
- Yugoslav Cup: Semi-finals
- UEFA Cup: Runners-up
- Top goalscorer: League: Dušan Savić (24); All: Dušan Savić (33)

During the 1978–79 season, Red Star Belgrade participated in the 1978–79 Yugoslav First League, 1978–79 Yugoslav Cup and 1978–79 UEFA Cup.

== Season summary ==
Red Star lost to Borussia Mönchengladbach in the 1979 UEFA Cup Final. Zoran Filipović missed the majority of the season due to his mandatory military service.

== Squad ==
Name	Yugoslav First League		Yugoslav Cup		UEFA Cup		Total	
Name	Apps	Goals	Apps	Goals	Apps	Goals	Apps	Goals
Goalkeepers
(Socialist Federal Republic of Yugoslavia) Aleksandar Stojanović	33	0	4	0	12	0	49	0
(Socialist Federal Republic of Yugoslavia) Živan Ljukovčan	1	0	0	0	0	0	1	0
Defenders
(Socialist Federal Republic of Yugoslavia) Nikola Jovanović	28	1	3	0	10	0	41	1
(Socialist Federal Republic of Yugoslavia) Zlatko Krmpotić	25	1	2	0	8	0	35	1
(Socialist Federal Republic of Yugoslavia) Milan Jovin	23	0	2	0	8	0	33	0
(Socialist Federal Republic of Yugoslavia) Ivan Jurišić	19	0	3	0	10	0	32	0
(Socialist Federal Republic of Yugoslavia) Dragan Miletović	16	0	0	0	7	0	23	0
(Socialist Federal Republic of Yugoslavia) Zoran Jelikić	13	0	3	0	4	0	20	0
(Socialist Federal Republic of Yugoslavia) Dragan Nikitović	1	0	1	0	0	0	2	0
(Socialist Federal Republic of Yugoslavia) Milovan Rajevac	0	0	1	0	0	0	1	0
Midfielders
(Socialist Federal Republic of Yugoslavia) Cvijetin Blagojević	32	3	4	0	11	2	47	5
(Socialist Federal Republic of Yugoslavia) Slavoljub Muslin	30	3	4	1	11	0	45	4
(Socialist Federal Republic of Yugoslavia) Nedeljko Milosavljević	27	6	4	1	11	0	42	7
(Socialist Federal Republic of Yugoslavia) Vladimir Petrović	27	5	2	2	10	1	39	8
(Socialist Federal Republic of Yugoslavia) Đorđe Milovanović	15	0	2	1	4	0	21	1
(Socialist Federal Republic of Yugoslavia) Zoran Simić	6	1	0	0	2	0	8	1
(Socialist Federal Republic of Yugoslavia) Dušan Nikolić	3	0	0	0	0	0	3	0
(Socialist Federal Republic of Yugoslavia) Zvonko Radić	1	0	0	0	0	0	1	0
(Socialist Federal Republic of Yugoslavia) Boško Gjurovski	1	0	0	0	0	0	1	0
(Socialist Federal Republic of Yugoslavia) Zdravko Čakalić	1	0	0	0	0	0	1	0
Forwards
(Socialist Federal Republic of Yugoslavia) Dušan Savić	30	24	4	4	12	5	46	33
(Socialist Federal Republic of Yugoslavia) Miloš Šestić	28	3	3	2	9	4	40	9
(Socialist Federal Republic of Yugoslavia) Zdravko Borovnica	27	3	4	0	7	2	38	5
(Socialist Federal Republic of Yugoslavia) Duško Lukić	15	0	1	0	3	0	19	0
(Socialist Federal Republic of Yugoslavia) Zoran Filipović	3	0	0	0	0	0	3	0
(Socialist Federal Republic of Yugoslavia) Milko Gjurovski	1	0	0	0	1	0	2	0
(Socialist Federal Republic of Yugoslavia) Draško Cvetković	1	0	0	0	0	0	1	0
Players sold or loaned out during the season
(Socialist Federal Republic of Yugoslavia) Mihailo Petrović	2	0	0	0	0	0	2	0
(Socialist Federal Republic of Yugoslavia) Petar Baralić	4	1	2	0	3	0	9	1
(Socialist Federal Republic of Yugoslavia) Mihalj Keri	17	0	2	0	6	0	25	0

== Results ==
=== Yugoslav First League ===
Pos	Team	Pld	W	D	L	GF	GA	GD	Pts	Qualification or relegation
1	Hajduk Split (C)	34	20	10	4	62	28	+34	50	Qualification for European Cup first round
2	Dinamo Zagreb	34	21	8	5	67	38	+29	50	Qualification for UEFA Cup first round
3	Red Star Belgrade	34	16	9	9	51	33	+18	41	Qualification for UEFA Cup first round
4	Sarajevo	34	17	5	12	56	53	+3	39	
5	Velež	34	15	8	11	50	41	+9	38	

Source: rsssf.org
Rules for classification: 1) points; 2) goal difference; 3) number of goals scored.
(C) Champions

Date	Opponent	Venue	Result	Scorers
12 August 1978	Budućnost	H	1–0	Šestić
19 August 1978	Napredak Kruševac	A	1–0	Savić
24 August 1978	Olimpija	H	3–1	Petrović, Savić, Milosavljević
27 August 1978	Hajduk Split	A	0–1	
2 September 1978	Željezničar	H	5–2	Petrović, Savić (4)
10 September 1978	Dinamo Zagreb	A	2–2	Blagojević, Savić (pen.)
17 September 1978	Radnički Niš	H	2–1	Blagojević, Jovanović
23 September 1978	Borac Banja Luka	A	1–2	Savić
8 October 1978	Osijek	H	1–1	Savić
14 October 1978	Velež	A	1–2	Baralić
29 October 1978	Vojvodina	H	1–0	Savić
3 November 1978	Rijeka	A	0–1	
12 November 1978	Sarajevo	H	0–1	
19 November 1978	Zagreb	A	0–0	
26 November 1978	Sloboda Tuzla	H	3–2	Savić (2), Milosavljević
29 November 1978	Partizan	A	3–1	Šestić, Milosavljević, Krmpotić
3 December 1978	OFK Beograd	H	5–1	Milosavljević (2), Savić (2), Petrović
3 March 1979	Budućnost	A	0–0	
10 March 1979	Napredak Kruševac	H	3–3	Savić (2), Milosavljević
17 March 1979	Olimpija	A	2–0	Blagojević, Muslin
25 March 1979	Hajduk Split	H	1–3	Savić
7 April 1979	Željezničar	A	1–0	Borovnica
15 April 1979	Dinamo Zagreb	H	1–2	Savić (pen.)
20 April 1979	Radnički Niš	A	1–1	Simić
29 April 1979	Borac Banja Luka	H	1–0	Savić
5 May 1979	Osijek	A	2–2	Muslin, Savić (pen.)
13 May 1979	Vojvodina	A	0–1	
16 May 1979	Velež	H	1–0	Muslin
27 May 1979	Sarajevo	A	0–0	
30 May 1979	Zagreb	H	2–0	Šestić, Petrović
3 June 1979	Sloboda Tuzla	A	0–1	
6 June 1979	Rijeka	H	0–0	
10 June 1979	Partizan	H	3–0	Savić (2), Borovnica
17 June 1979	OFK Beograd	A	4–2	Savić (2), Borovnica, Petrović

=== Yugoslav Cup ===
Date	Opponent	Venue	Result	Scorers
30 August 1978	Budućnost	H	4–1	Šestić, Savić, Milosavljević, Petrović
8 November 1978	Sutjeska	A	3–3 (5–4 p)	Savić (2), Petrović
25 February 1979	Novi Sad	H	4–0	Šestić, Savić, Milovanović, Muslin
4 April 1979	Rijeka	H	0–1	

=== UEFA Cup ===
==== First round ====
13 September 1978	Berliner FC Dynamo (East Germany)	5–2	(Socialist Federal Republic of Yugoslavia) Red Star Belgrade	Friedrich-Ludwig-Jahn-Sportpark, East Berlin
	Riediger 16', 28', 69'; Netz 20'; Brillat 89'	Report	Šestić 34'; Savić 36'	Attendance: 35,000; Referee: Gianfranco Menegali (Italy)

27 September 1978	Red Star Belgrade (Socialist Federal Republic of Yugoslavia)	4–1	(East Germany) Berliner FC Dynamo	Red Star Stadium, Belgrade
	Savić 58'; Borovnica 69', 80'; Lauck 89' (o.g.)	Report	Riediger 12'	Attendance: 50,000; Referee: Sándor Kuti (Hungary)

==== Second round ====
18 October 1978	Sporting Gijón (Spain)	0–1	(Socialist Federal Republic of Yugoslavia) Red Star Belgrade	El Molinón, Gijón
		Report	Blagojević 85'	Attendance: 47,000; Referee: John Carpenter (Republic of Ireland)

1 November 1978	Red Star Belgrade (Socialist Federal Republic of Yugoslavia)	1–1	(Spain) Sporting Gijón	Red Star Stadium, Belgrade
	Petrović 80'	Report	Borovnica 22' (o.g.)	Attendance: 50,000; Referee: Georges Konrath (France)

==== Third round ====
22 November 1978	Red Star Belgrade (Socialist Federal Republic of Yugoslavia)	1–0	(England) Arsenal	Red Star Stadium, Belgrade
	Blagojević 12'	Report		Attendance: 51,000; Referee: Eldar Azimzade (Soviet Union)

6 December 1978	Arsenal (England)	1–1	(Socialist Federal Republic of Yugoslavia) Red Star Belgrade	Arsenal Stadium, London
	Sunderland 69'	Report	Savić 87'	Attendance: 41,566; Referee: Ulf Eriksson (Sweden)

==== Quarter-finals ====
7 March 1979	Red Star Belgrade (Socialist Federal Republic of Yugoslavia)	1–0	(England) West Bromwich Albion	Red Star Stadium, Belgrade
	Savić 86'	Report		Attendance: 95,000; Referee: Vojtech Christov (Czechoslovakia)

21 March 1979	West Bromwich Albion (England)	1–1	(Socialist Federal Republic of Yugoslavia) Red Star Belgrade	The Hawthorns, Birmingham
	Regis 42'	Report	Šestić 88'	Attendance: 31,587; Referee: Klaus Scheurell (East Germany)

==== Semi-finals ====
11 April 1979	Red Star Belgrade (Socialist Federal Republic of Yugoslavia)	1–0	(West Germany) Hertha BSC	Red Star Stadium, Belgrade
	Savić 7'	Report		Attendance: 95,000; Referee: Alexis Ponnet (Belgium)

25 April 1979	Hertha BSC (West Germany)	2–1	(Socialist Federal Republic of Yugoslavia) Red Star Belgrade	Olympiastadion, West Berlin
	Beer 2'; Sidka 18'	Report	Šestić 74'	Attendance: 75,000; Referee: Riccardo Lattanzi (Italy)

==== Final ====
9 May 1979	Red Star Belgrade (Socialist Federal Republic of Yugoslavia)	1–1	(West Germany) Borussia Mönchengladbach	Red Star Stadium, Belgrade
	Šestić 22'	Report	Jurišić 60' (o.g.)	Attendance: 90,000; Referee: Ian Foote (Scotland)

23 May 1979	Borussia Mönchengladbach (West Germany)	1–0	(Socialist Federal Republic of Yugoslavia) Red Star Belgrade	Rheinstadion, Düsseldorf
	Simonsen 18' (pen.)	Report		Attendance: 45,000; Referee: Alberto Michelotti (Italy)

== See also ==
- List of Red Star Belgrade seasons
