= Blagojević =

Blagojević (Cyrillic: Благојевић) pronounced [blaːgojeʋit͡ɕ]), also anglicized as Blagojevich or Blagoyevich, is a Montenegrin and Serbian surname, derived from the male given name (patronymic) of Blagoje. It may refer to:

== Blagojevic / Blagojević ==
- Dragiša Blagojević (born 1966), Montenegrin chess grandmaster
- Cvijetin Blagojević (born 1955), Bosnian Serb football manager and former player
- Jelena Blagojević (born 1988), Serbian volleyball player
- Jovan Blagojevic (disambiguation), multiple people
- Katarina Blagojević, (1943–2021), Serbian chess master
- Ljiljana Blagojević (born 1955), Serbian actress
- Milan Blagojevic (disambiguation), multiple people
  - Milan Blagojevic (footballer), Australian football player
  - Milan Blagojević (basketball), Serbian basketball player
  - Milan Blagojević Španac, (1905–1941), Yugoslav military officer
  - Milan Blagojević (professor), Serbian jurist
- Miloš Blagojević (1930–2013), Serbian historian
- Saša Blagojević (b. 1989), Serbian footballer
- Slavko Blagojević (b. 1987), Croatian footballer
- Vera Blagojević (1920–1942), Yugoslav protester
- Vidoje Blagojević (born 1950) — Republika Srpska Army commander and Bosnian Serb war criminal
- Željko Blagojević, Bosnian Serb runner and protester

=== Blagojevich ===
- Patricia Blagojevich (born 1965), née Mell, former First Lady of Illinois and wife of Rod Blagojevich
- Petar Blagojevich (died 1725), also spelled as Peter Plogojowitz — Serbian peasant suspected of becoming a vampire after his death
- Rod Blagojevich (born 1956), American politician, former Governor of Illinois

== See also ==
- Blagoev, Bulgarian equivalent
