= Slavoljub Muslin =

Serbian footballer

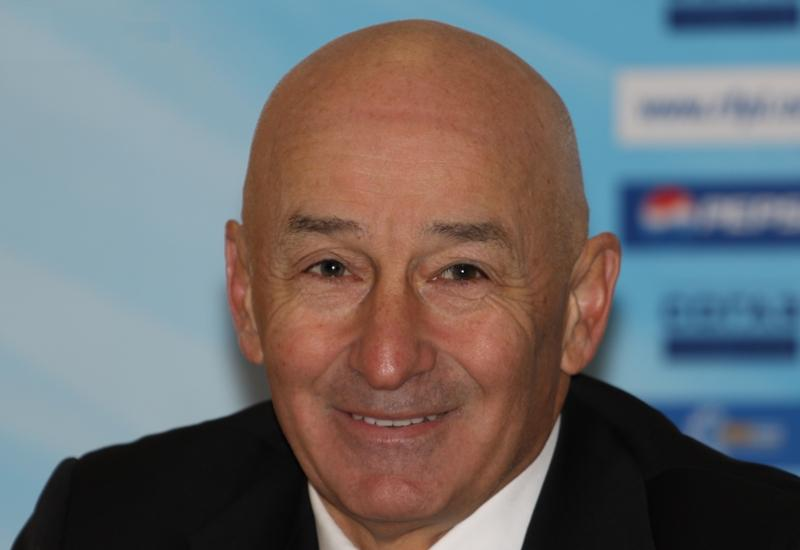
- Muslin in 2011

Personal information
- Full name: Slavoljub Muslin
- Date of birth: 15 June 1953 (age 73)
- Place of birth: Kragujevac, PR Serbia, FPR Yugoslavia
- Height: 1.81 m (5 ft 11 in)
- Position: Defender

Youth career
- Beograd
- OFK Beograd

Senior career*
Years	Team	Apps	(Gls)
1972–1973	OFK Beograd	0	(0)
1973–1974	BASK		
1974–1975	Rad	33	(0)
1975–1981	Red Star Belgrade	140	(3)
1981–1983	Lille	66	(11)
1983–1986	Brest	105	(5)
1986–1987	Caen	15	(1)
Total		359	(20)

Managerial career
- 1989–1991: Brest
- 1992–1995: Pau
- 1995–1996: Bordeaux
- 1996–1997: Lens
- 1997–1998: Le Mans
- 1998: Raja Casablanca
- 1999–2001: Red Star Belgrade
- 2002–2003: Levski Sofia
- 2003–2004: Red Star Belgrade
- 2004–2005: Metalurh Donetsk
- 2005: Lokeren
- 2005–2006: Lokomotiv Moscow
- 2006–2007: Lokeren
- 2007–2008: Khimki
- 2008–2009: Dinamo Minsk
- 2009–2010: Anorthosis
- 2010–2013: Krasnodar
- 2014: Amkar Perm
- 2015: Standard Liège
- 2016–2017: Serbia
- 2018–2019: Al-Fayha
- * Club domestic league appearances and goals

Slavoljub Muslin (Serbian Cyrillic: Славољуб Муслин, pronounced [slǎʋoʎub mǔslin]; born 15 June 1953) is a Serbian former football manager and player.

Muslin began his head coaching career in 1988 and has since had stints in France, Morocco, Serbia, Bulgaria, Ukraine, Belgium, Cyprus, Belarus, Russia and Saudi Arabia. As a player, he played as a defender for several clubs, the most important being Red Star Belgrade and later Lille.

Muslin qualified for the 2018 World Cup with the Serbia national team although he was sacked before the final tournament.

== Playing career ==
Born to Croatian father Duje (from Split) and Serbian mother Danica (from Kragujevac), Muslin was born in Kragujevac and raised in Belgrade, where he started playing football with Karaburma's FK Beograd and OFK Beograd, continuing on in BASK, and Rad, before transferring to Red Star Belgrade.

Muslin was a defensive stalwart for Red Star Belgrade in the 1970s. Throughout his six years at the Marakana, he played alongside some of the club's biggest stars, such as Dragan Džajić, Vladislav Bogićević, Jovan Aćimović, Vladimir Petrović and Dušan Savić. He won three championship titles with Red Star and finished as runner-up in the UEFA Cup in 1978-79, losing in the final to Borussia Mönchengladbach.

In 1981, he moved on to Lille, then to Brest and finished his playing career with Caen.

== Coaching career ==
=== France and Morocco ===
Muslin began coaching in 1988 at the club where he spent some playing years earlier – Brest – staying there until 1992. For the last two years of his tenure, he had David Ginola in the squad.

Muslin spent the next three seasons at Pau, before moving on to Bordeaux in the summer of 1995. With a potent squad of quality up-and-coming players like Bixente Lizarazu, Christophe Dugarry as well as superstar-in-the-making Zinedine Zidane, Muslin led the team on a great run in the 1995–96 UEFA Cup ensuring progression to the quarterfinals before winter break 1995–96. He was sacked during spring 1996 due to poor domestic league form, which meant that he didn't get to lead the team in the UEFA Cup quarterfinals where the Girondins eliminated the favourites AC Milan and later made it to the final where they lost to a Bayern Munich team featuring the likes of Lothar Matthäus, Jürgen Klinsmann, Oliver Kahn and Markus Babbel.

Lens became Muslin's home in the summer of 1996. He coached the team in 1996–97 season, before getting the axe on 11 March 1997.

He went to Le Mans in the summer of 1997.

He changed clubs during the 1998–99 season, moving to coaching the Moroccan side Raja Casablanca.

=== Red Star, Levski and Red Star again ===
Muslin took over the reins of his old club Red Star Belgrade on 20 September 1999 in difficult circumstances after Miloljub Ostojić was sacked because of poor league form and a 1–0 first leg "home" loss (the match being played in Sofia due to an air traffic embargo imposed on FR Yugoslavia following the NATO bombing that ended a couple of months earlier) to Montpellier in the UEFA Cup first round. Though he couldn't lead his squad past the French team in the second leg (his first match in charge), Muslin won the domestic double (league and cup) at the end of the season in impressive fashion.

He won the league again next season, but lost in the cup final to bitter rivals Partizan.

He resigned from his post on 30 September 2001, six weeks into the 2001–02 league season. The specific reason was never given, but it is widely believed it had to do with the ongoing simmering row with striker Mihajlo Pjanović that came to a head during the Champions League third round qualifying tie, when Muslin dropped the 24-year-old forward and Red Star ended up losing 0–3 to Bayer Leverkusen.

Muslin was not without a job for too long, as in late March 2002, Levski Sofia sacked their coach Rüdiger Abramczik mid-season and offered the job to Muslin, who promptly steered the team to the league and cup double in May. He was sacked in April 2003, as Levski were trailing the leaders by eight points in the domestic league. The team went on to win the National Cup under the management of Georgi Todorov.

In June 2003, Red Star came calling again after two seasons under coach Zoran Filipović. By the following spring Muslin brought his second domestic double to the club as a coach. The split from Red Star was again full of controversy. After winning the title, Muslin reportedly wanted more say in the club's transfer policy, essentially calling for his coaching role to be expanded into what club managers in England do. Red Star president Dragan Džajić would have none of it and a huge row erupted. At one point, Džajić – usually calm and collected – exploded in the media, calling Muslin a "piece of garbage."

=== Metalurh, Lokeren, Lokomotiv and Lokeren again ===
The next stop for Muslin in summer 2004 became Ukraine's Metalurh Donetsk, which he coached fairly successfully for the better part of 2004–05 domestic league season. Simultaneously, Muslin also led the team in 2004–05 UEFA Cup – with much less distinguished outcome – after successfully overcoming the qualifying stage, Metalurh was demolished by Lazio (0–6 on aggregate). He resigned from his post on 8 March 2005, citing differences in opinion over the vision for the team's immediate future as the reason. His departure came after league matchday 17 with Metalurh occupying the 3rd spot in Vyscha Liha.

Then came Belgian side Lokeren between May and December 2005.

In December 2005, Muslin was appointed as coach of Lokomotiv Moscow. With star forward Dmitri Sychev as the team's undisputed leader on the pitch, Lokomotiv started the Russian League 2006 season in great fashion, jumping ahead early to the top of the table and going on an 18-match unbeaten streak at one point. Closely pursued by CSKA Moscow, Lokomotiv kept holding on to the top league spot until mid-October when a string of indifferent results saw them surrender it. Muslin was already under the gun following his team's elimination in UEFA Cup's first round to Belgian side Zulte Waregem, and after giving up the league leading position, he was promptly fired in October 2006.

On 26 November 2006, Muslin's return to Lokeren bench was announced. He arrived at the club in the middle of a bad run of results that prompted previous coach Ariël Jacobs' departure with Lokeren in 13th league spot. However, Muslin failed to raise the team's form and Lokeren barely avoided relegation, finishing the Belgian Jupiler League 2006–07 campaign in 16th spot (out of 18 teams). During the summer 2007, Muslin was replaced with Georges Leekens.

=== Khimki, Dinamo Minsk and Anorthosis ===
On 7 September 2007, Muslin was announced as the new coach of Khimki. At the time of his arrival, following matchday 23 of the 2007 season, the team was occupying eleventh league spot, only three points out of the relegation zone. Under his guidance, Khimki finished the season ninth place, five points out of the relegation zone. In the 2008 season, after matchday 5, Khimki occupied the 16th spot out of 16 after 0–4 defeat from Rubin Kazan. On 14 April 2008, Muslin was fired.

On 17 September 2008, he was named as the new head coach of Dinamo Minsk. But, just ten months later on 27 July 2009, he was sacked once again.

On 7 August 2009, he signed a contract with the Cypriot club Anorthosis Famagusta, a year after the team's appearance in the group stages of the UEFA Champions League in the 2008–2009 season. Muslin replaced German coach Ernst Middendorp. He was released in 2010, due to the elimination of team in the quarter-finals of the cup, although the team was second in the Championship.

=== 2010s–present ===
Muslin led Krasnodar from 2010 to 2013.

On 17 June 2014, Muslin was announced as the new head coach of Amkar Perm in Russian Football Premier League. But, after the end of the first part of the 2014-15 season, he was sacked for unsatisfactory results.

Muslin was announced as a new head coach of Standard Liège on 5 June 2015. His departure was announced on 28 August 2015.

==== Serbia ====
Muslin became Serbia manager on 5 May 2016. During his tenure, Serbia finished top of their 2018 World Cup qualifying group ahead of the Republic of Ireland, thus qualifying for a major competitive tournament after eight years. Despite this, he was sacked in October 2017.

==== Al-Fayha ====
Most recently, Muslin coached Al-Fayha of the Saudi Pro League.

== Personal life ==
His son Marko is also a professional footballer.

== Managerial statistics ==
As of match played 2 February 2019

Team	From	To	Record				
Team	From	To	G	W	D	L	Win %
{Brest	February 1989	May 1991	89	34	24	31	38.20
Pau	June 1992	May 1995	100	37	34	29	37.00
Bordeaux	July 1995	February 1996	42	20	8	14	47.62
Lens	1 July 1996	11 March 1997	35	11	7	17	31.43
Le Mans	June 1997	June 1998	46	18	15	13	39.13
Raja Casablanca	June 1998	November 1998	0	0	0	0	—
Red Star Belgrade	September 1999	September 2001	102	75	18	9	73.53
Levski Sofia	March 2002	April 2003	47	32	8	7	68.09
Red Star Belgrade	June 2003	May 2004	41	31	7	3	75.61
Metalurh Donetsk	July 2004	March 2005	24	15	2	7	62.50
Lokeren	May 2005	December 2005	16	7	3	6	43.75
Lokomotiv Moscow	December 2005	October 2006	33	16	9	8	48.48
Lokeren	November 2006	July 2007	20	2	8	10	10.00
Khimki	September 2007	April 2008	12	4	2	6	33.33
Dinamo Minsk	17 September 2008	27 July 2009	25	14	7	4	56.00
Anorthosis	August 2009	February 2010	31	21	3	7	67.74
Krasnodar	January 2011	August 2013	83	31	20	32	37.35
Amkar Perm	June 2014	December 2014	17	3	4	10	17.65
Standard Liège	5 June 2015	28 August 2015	9	5	1	3	55.56
Serbia	5 May 2016	30 October 2017	15	8	5	2	53.33
Al-Fayha	October 2018	February 2019	15	5	3	7	33.33
Total			802	389	188	225	48.50

== Honours ==
=== Player ===
Red Star Belgrade

- Yugoslav First League: 1976–77, 1979–80, 1980–81
- UEFA Cup runner-up: 1978–79

=== Manager ===
Red Star Belgrade

- First League of Serbia and Montenegro: 1999–2000, 2000–01, 2003–04
- Serbia and Montenegro Cup: 1999–2000, 2003–04

Levski Sofia

- Bulgarian First League: 2001–02
- Bulgarian Cup: 2001–02
