= Blagoje =

Male given name

- Pronunciation: Serbo-Croatian: [blâɡoje])
- Gender: Male
- Language: Serbo-Croatian

Origin
- Word/name: Slavic
- Meaning: Gentle, mild

Other names
- Derived: blag + oje

Blagoje (Serbian Cyrillic: Благоје) is a masculine Slavic name derived from the roots blag ("gentle, mild") and -oje. It is recorded in Serbia since the Middle Ages. It may refer to:

- Blagoje Adžić (1932–2012), the acting minister of defence in the Yugoslav government
- Blagoje Bersa (1873–1934), Croatian musical composer
- Blagoje Bratić (1946–2008), Bosnian Serb former football player
- Blagoje Marjanović (1907–1984), Serbian football forward
- Blagoje Parović (1903–1937), politician
- Blagoje Paunović (1947–2014), former Serbian football defender
- Blagoje Simić (born 1960), Serbian war criminal sentenced by the International Criminal Tribunal for the Former Yugoslavia
- Blagoje Vidinić (1934–2006), footballer and football coach

== See also ==
- Blagojević, Serbo-Croatian surname
- Blagoy, Bulgarian name
- Blagoj, Macedonian name
- Blagoev, Bulgarian surname

== Sources ==
- Grković, Milica (1977). Rečnik ličnih imena kod Srba. Belgrade: Vuk Karadžić.
