= 1979 UEFA Cup final =

- Match program booklet for the first leg
- Event: 1978–79 UEFA Cup
| Red Star Belgrade | Borussia Mönchengladbach |
| (Socialist Federal Republic of Yugoslavia) | (West Germany) |
| 1 | 2 |
- on aggregate

First leg
| Red Star Belgrade | Borussia Mönchengladbach |
| 1 | 1 |
- Date: 9 May 1979
- Venue: Red Star Stadium, Belgrade
- Referee: Ian Foote (Scotland)
- Attendance: 90,000

Second leg
| Borussia Mönchengladbach | Red Star Belgrade |
| 1 | 0 |
- Date: 23 May 1979
- Venue: Rheinstadion, Düsseldorf
- Referee: Alberto Michelotti (Italy)
- Attendance: 45,000

The 1979 UEFA Cup Final was played on 9 May 1979, and 23 May 1979, between Red Star Belgrade of SFR Yugoslavia and Borussia Mönchengladbach of West Germany. Mönchengladbach won 2–1 on aggregate.

== Route to the final ==
| (Socialist Federal Republic of Yugoslavia) Red Star Belgrade | | | | Round | (West Germany) Borussia Mönchengladbach | | | |
|---|---|---|---|---|---|---|---|---|
UEFA Cup
| Opponent | Agg. | 1st leg | 2nd leg | | Opponent | Agg. | 1st leg | 2nd leg |
| (East Germany) Dynamo Berlin | 6–6 (a) | 2–5 (A) | 4–1 (H) | First round | (Austria) Sturm Graz | 7–2 | 5–1 (H) | 2–1 (A) |
| (Spain) Sporting Gijón | 2–1 | 1–0 (A) | 1–1 (H) | Second round | (Portugal) Benfica | 2–0 (a.e.t.) | 0–0 (A) | 2–0 (H) |
| (England) Arsenal | 2–1 | 1–0 (H) | 1–1 (A) | Third round | (Poland) Śląsk Wrocław | 5–3 | 1–1 (H) | 4–2 (A) |
| (England) West Bromwich Albion | 2–1 | 1–0 (H) | 1–1 (A) | Quarter-finals | (England) Manchester City | 4–2 | 1–1 (A) | 3–1 (H) |
| (West Germany) Hertha BSC | 2–2 (a) | 1–0 (H) | 1–2 (A) | Semi-finals | (West Germany) Duisburg | 6–3 | 2–2 (A) | 4–1 (H) |

== Match details ==
=== First leg ===
9 May 1979
20:00

| Red Star Belgrade (Socialist Federal Republic of Yugoslavia) | 1–1 | (West Germany) Borussia Mönchengladbach |
|---|---|---|
| Šestić 22' | Report Overview (archive) Overview | Jurišić 60' (o.g.) |

Red Star Stadium, Belgrade
Attendance: 90,000
Referee: Ian Foote (Scotland)

| Red Star Belgrade | Borussia Mönchengladbach |

| GK | 1 | (Socialist Federal Republic of Yugoslavia) Aleksandar Stojanović |
| RB | 2 | (Socialist Federal Republic of Yugoslavia) Nikola Jovanović |
| LB | 3 | (Socialist Federal Republic of Yugoslavia) Milan Jovin |
| RM | 4 | (Socialist Federal Republic of Yugoslavia) Slavoljub Muslin | (substituted off) 78' |
| CB | 5 | (Socialist Federal Republic of Yugoslavia) Dragan Miletović |
| CB | 6 | (Socialist Federal Republic of Yugoslavia) Ivan Jurišić |
| CM | 7 | (Socialist Federal Republic of Yugoslavia) Vladimir Petrović (c) |
| CM | 8 | (Socialist Federal Republic of Yugoslavia) Cvijetin Blagojević |
| CF | 9 | (Socialist Federal Republic of Yugoslavia) Dušan Savić |
| LM | 10 | (Socialist Federal Republic of Yugoslavia) Nedeljko Milosavljević | (substituted off) 78' |
| CF | 11 | (Socialist Federal Republic of Yugoslavia) Miloš Šestić |
Substitutes:
| DF | 13 | (Socialist Federal Republic of Yugoslavia) Zlatko Krmpotić | (substituted on) 78' |
| MF | 15 | (Socialist Federal Republic of Yugoslavia) Đorđe Milovanović | (substituted on) 78' |
Manager:
(Socialist Federal Republic of Yugoslavia) Branko Stanković

| GK | 1 | (West Germany) Wolfgang Kneib |
| RB | 2 | (West Germany) Berti Vogts (c) |
| CB | 3 | (West Germany) Wilfried Hannes |
| CB | 4 | (West Germany) Frank Schäffer |
| LB | 5 | (West Germany) Norbert Ringels |
| RM | 6 | (West Germany) Winfried Schäfer |
| CF | 7 | (Denmark) Allan Simonsen |
| CM | 8 | (West Germany) Christian Kulik |
| CM | 9 | (Denmark) Carsten Nielsen | (substituted off) 75' |
| LM | 10 | (West Germany) Horst Wohlers | (substituted off) 78' |
| CF | 11 | (West Germany) Ewald Lienen |
Substitutes:
| MF | 12 | (West Germany) Dietmar Danner | (substituted on) 75' |
| FW | 13 | (West Germany) Rudi Gores | (substituted on) 78' |
Manager:
(West Germany) Udo Lattek

=== Second leg ===
23 May 1979
20:15

| Borussia Mönchengladbach (West Germany) | 1–0 | (Socialist Federal Republic of Yugoslavia) Red Star Belgrade |
|---|---|---|
| Simonsen 18' (pen.) | Report Overview (archive) Overview |

Rheinstadion, Düsseldorf
Attendance: 45,000
Referee: Alberto Michelotti (Italy)

| Borussia Mönchengladbach | Red Star Belgrade |

| GK | 1 | (West Germany) Wolfgang Kneib |
| RB | 2 | (West Germany) Berti Vogts (c) |
| CB | 3 | (West Germany) Wilfried Hannes |
| CB | 4 | (West Germany) Frank Schäffer |
| LB | 5 | (West Germany) Norbert Ringels |
| RM | 6 | (West Germany) Winfried Schäfer |
| CF | 7 | (Denmark) Allan Simonsen |
| CM | 8 | (West Germany) Christian Kulik | (substituted off) 59' |
| CM | 9 | (West Germany) Rudi Gores |
| LM | 10 | (West Germany) Horst Wohlers |
| CF | 11 | (West Germany) Ewald Lienen |
Substitutes:
| MF | 12 | (West Germany) Horst Köppel | (substituted on) 59' |
Manager:
(West Germany) Udo Lattek

| GK | 1 | (Socialist Federal Republic of Yugoslavia) Aleksandar Stojanović |
| RB | 2 | (Socialist Federal Republic of Yugoslavia) Nikola Jovanović |
| LB | 3 | (Socialist Federal Republic of Yugoslavia) Milan Jovin |
| RM | 4 | (Socialist Federal Republic of Yugoslavia) Slavoljub Muslin |
| CB | 5 | (Socialist Federal Republic of Yugoslavia) Dragan Miletović |
| CB | 6 | (Socialist Federal Republic of Yugoslavia) Ivan Jurišić |
| CM | 7 | (Socialist Federal Republic of Yugoslavia) Vladimir Petrović (c) |
| CM | 8 | (Socialist Federal Republic of Yugoslavia) Cvijetin Blagojević |
| CF | 9 | (Socialist Federal Republic of Yugoslavia) Dušan Savić |
| LM | 10 | (Socialist Federal Republic of Yugoslavia) Đorđe Milovanović | (substituted off) 46' |
| CF | 11 | (Socialist Federal Republic of Yugoslavia) Nedeljko Milosavljević |
Substitutes:
| FW | 15 | (Socialist Federal Republic of Yugoslavia) Miloš Šestić | (substituted on) 46' |
Manager:
(Socialist Federal Republic of Yugoslavia) Branko Stanković

== See also ==
- 1979 European Cup final
- 1979 European Cup Winners' Cup final
- Red Star Belgrade in European football
- 1978–79 Red Star Belgrade season
