= Serbian football clubs in European competitions =

- Points by season (UEFA coefficient)
Season	Points
2006–07	2.125
2007–08	2.625
2008–09	3.000
2009–10	3.000
2010–11	3.500
2011–12	2.125
2012–13	3.000
2013–14	2.500
2014–15	2.750
2015–16	4.250
2016–17	2.875
2017–18	6.375
2018–19	6.000
2019–20	6.000
2020–21	5.500
2021–22	9.500
2022–23	5.375
2023–24	1.400

Serbian football clubs have participated in European football competitions since its formation, in 1955. It was a game including a Serbian club that marked the kick-off of UEFA European club competitions. It was played on 4 September 1955, in Estádio Nacional in Lisbon, between Portuguese champions Sporting CP, and Yugoslav champions, Partizan (a 3–3 draw, later Partizan won 5–2 in Belgrade). Serbian clubs were by a large margin the most representative among all republics of former Yugoslavia. During Yugoslav periods, Serbian clubs played 3 finals, with the highlight happening in 1991 when Red Star Belgrade became European and world champions.

Serbia is considered by FIFA and UEFA to be the only official successor of both the Yugoslavia and Serbia and Montenegro national teams, Before 1992, Serbia was a part of Yugoslavia and between 1992 and 2006, Serbia was part of FR Yugoslavia and Serbia and Montenegro.

All statistics and records are accurate as of 17 August 2020.

== UEFA coefficient and ranking ==
For the 2023–24 UEFA competitions, the associations will be allocated places according to their 2022 UEFA country coefficients, which will take into account their performance in European competitions from 2017–18 to 2021–22. In the 2022 rankings used to allocate berths for the 2023–24 European competitions, Serbia's coefficient points total will be 33.375. After earning a score of 9.500 during the 2020–21 European campaign, Serbia moved up to the 11th best association in Europe out of 54 for this season.

Rank	Nation	Points
9	Scotland	36.900
10	Russia	34.482
11	Serbia	33.375
12	Ukraine	31.800
13	Belgium	30.600

- Full list

== Finals ==
Year	Competition	Serbian team	Opposing team	Score	Venue
1966	European Cup	Partizan	(Spain) Real Madrid	1–2	(Belgium) King Baudouin Stadium, Brussels
1979	UEFA Cup	Red Star Belgrade	(West Germany) Borussia Mönchengladbach	1–2 on aggregate	Two-legged
1991	European Cup	Red Star Belgrade	(France) Marseille	0–0 (5–3 pen.)	(Italy) Stadio San Nicola, Bari
1991	Super Cup	Red Star Belgrade	(England) Manchester United	0–1	(England) Old Trafford, Manchester

== Competitions ==
=== European Cup/ UEFA Champions League ===
Club	Champions	Finalist	Semifinalist	Quarterfinalist	Group Stage
Red Star	1991	-	1957, 1971, 1992	1958, 1974, 1981, 1982, 1987	1992, 2018, 2019, 2023, 2024
Partizan	-	1966	-	1956, 1964	2003, 2010
Vojvodina	-	-	-	1967	-

=== UEFA Cup/ UEFA Europa League ===
Club	Champions	Finalist	Semifinalist	Quarterfinalist
Red Star	-	1979	-	-
Radnički Niš	-	-	1982	-
OFK Beograd	-	-	-	1973

=== UEFA Cup Winners' Cup ===
Club	Champions	Finalist	Semifinalist	Quarterfinalist
Red Star	-	-	1975	1972, 1986
OFK Beograd	-	-	1963	-
Partizan	-	-	-	1990

=== Intercontinental Cup ===
Club	Champions	Finalist
Red Star	1991	-

=== UEFA Super Cup ===
Club	Champions	Finalist
Red Star	-	1991

=== UEFA Intertoto Cup ===
Club	Champions	Finalist	Semifinalist	Quarterfinalist
Vojvodina	1976	1998	-	-
Hajduk Kula	-	2007	-	-

=== Inter-Cities Fairs Cup ===
Club	Champions	Finalist	Semifinalist	Quarterfinalist
Red Star	-	-	1962	1963
Vojvodina	-	-	-	1962, 1968

=== Active ===
==== European Cup/Champions League ====
===== SFR Yugoslavia era (1955–1992) =====
Season	Club	Round	Opponent	Home	Away	Agg.
1955–56	Partizan	FR	(Portugal) Sporting CP	5–2	3–3	8–5
1955–56	Partizan	QF	(Spain) Real Madrid	3–0	0–4	3–4
1956–57	Red Star Belgrade	FR	(Netherlands) Rapid JC	2–0	4–3	6–3
1956–57	Red Star Belgrade	QF	(Bulgaria) CDNA Sofia	3–1	1–2	4–3
1956–57	Red Star Belgrade	SF	(Italy) Fiorentina	0–1	0–0	0–1
1957–58	Red Star Belgrade	PR	(Luxembourg) Stade Dudelange	9–1	5–0	14–1
1957–58	Red Star Belgrade	FR	(Sweden) IFK Norrköping	2–1	2–2	4–3
1957–58	Red Star Belgrade	QF	(England) Manchester United	3–3	1–2	4–5
1959–60	Red Star Belgrade	R16	(England) Wolverhampton Wanderers	1–1	0–3	1–4
1960–61	Red Star Belgrade	PR	(Hungary) Újpesti Dózsa	1–2	0–3	1–5
1961–62	Partizan	PR	(Portugal) Sporting CP	2–0	1–1	3–1
1961–62	Partizan	FR	(Italy) Juventus	1–2	0–5	1–7
1962–63	Partizan	PR	(Bulgaria) CSKA Red Flag	1–4	1–2	2–6
1963–64	Partizan	PR	(Cyprus) Anorthosis Famagusta	3–0	3–1	6–1
1963–64	Partizan	FR	(Luxembourg) Jeunesse Esch	6–2	1–2	7–4
1963–64	Partizan	QF	(Italy) Internazionale	0–2	1–2	1–4
1964–65	Red Star Belgrade	PR	(Scotland) Rangers	4–2	1–3	5–5 (1–3 playoff)
1965–66	Partizan	PR	(France) Nantes	2–0	2–2	4–2
1965–66	Partizan	FR	(West Germany) Werder Bremen	3–0	0–1	3–1
1965–66	Partizan	QF	(Czechoslovakia) Sparta Prague	5–0	1–4	6–4
1965–66	Partizan	SF	(England) Manchester United	2–0	0–1	2–1
1965–66	Partizan	Final	(Spain) Real Madrid	1–2		
1966–67	Vojvodina	FR	(Austria) Admira Energie Vienna	0–0	1–0	1–0
1966–67	Vojvodina	SR	(Spain) Atlético Madrid	3–1	0–2	3–3 (3–2 playoff)
1966–67	Vojvodina	QF	(Scotland) Celtic	1–0	0–2	1–2
1968–69	Red Star Belgrade	FR	(East Germany) Carl Zeiss Jena	—N/a	—N/a	w/o
1968–69	Red Star Belgrade	SR	(Scotland) Celtic	1–1	1–5	2–6
1969–70	Red Star Belgrade	FR	(Northern Ireland) Linfield	8–0	4–2	12–2
1969–70	Red Star Belgrade	SR	(East Germany) Vorwärts Berlin	3–2	1–2	4–4 (a)
1970–71	Red Star Belgrade	FR	(Hungary) Újpesti Dózsa	4–0	0–2	4–2
1970–71	Red Star Belgrade	SR	(Romania) UTA Arad	3–0	3–1	6–1
1970–71	Red Star Belgrade	QF	(East Germany) Carl Zeiss Jena	4–0	2–3	6–3
1970–71	Red Star Belgrade	SF	(Greece) Panathinaikos	4–1	0–3	4–4 (a)
1973–74	Red Star Belgrade	FR	(Poland) Stal Mielec	2–1	1–0	3–1
1973–74	Red Star Belgrade	SR	(England) Liverpool	2–1	2–1	4–2
1973–74	Red Star Belgrade	QF	(Spain) Atlético Madrid	0–2	0–0	0–2
1976–77	Partizan	FR	(Soviet Union) Dynamo Kyiv	0–2	0–3	0–5
1977–78	Red Star Belgrade	FR	(Republic of Ireland) Sligo Rovers	3–0	3–0	6–0
1977–78	Red Star Belgrade	SR	(West Germany) Borussia Mönchengladbach	0–3	1–5	1–8
1978–79	Partizan	FR	(East Germany) Dynamo Dresden	2–0	0–2	2–2 (4–5 p)
1980–81	Red Star Belgrade	FR	(Norway) Viking	4–1	3–2	7–3
1980–81	Red Star Belgrade	SR	(Switzerland) Basel	2–0	0–1	2–1
1980–81	Red Star Belgrade	QF	(Italy) Internazionale	0–1	1–1	1–2
1981–82	Red Star Belgrade	FR	(Malta) Hibernians	8–1	2–1	10–2
1981–82	Red Star Belgrade	SR	(Czechoslovakia) Baník Ostrava	3–0	1–3	4–3
1981–82	Red Star Belgrade	QF	(Belgium) Anderlecht	1–2	1–2	2–4
1983–84	Partizan	FR	(Norway) Viking	5–1	0–0	5–1
1983–84	Partizan	SR	(East Germany) Dynamo Berlin	1–0	0–2	1–2
1984–85	Red Star Belgrade	FR	(Portugal) Benfica	3–2	0–2	3–4
1986–87	Red Star Belgrade	FR	(Greece) Panathinaikos	3–0	1–2	4–2
1986–87	Red Star Belgrade	SR	(Norway) Rosenborg	4–1	3–0	7–1
1986–87	Red Star Belgrade	QF	(Spain) Real Madrid	4–2	0–2	4–4 (a)
1988–89	Red Star Belgrade	FR	(Republic of Ireland) Dundalk	3–0	5–0	8–0
1988–89	Red Star Belgrade	SR	(Italy) Milan	1–1	1–1	2–2 (2–4 p)
1989–90	Vojvodina	FR	(Hungary) Budapest Honvéd	2–1	0–1	2–2 (a)
1990–91	Red Star Belgrade	FR	(Switzerland) Grasshopper	1–1	4–1	5–2
1990–91	Red Star Belgrade	SR	(Scotland) Rangers	3–0	1–1	4–1
1990–91	Red Star Belgrade	QF	(East Germany) Dynamo Dresden	3–0	2–1	5–1
1990–91	Red Star Belgrade	SF	(Germany) Bayern Munich	2–2	2–1	4–3
1990–91	Red Star Belgrade	Final	(France) Marseille	0–0 (5–3 p)		
1991–92	Red Star Belgrade	FR	(Northern Ireland) Portadown	4–0	4–0	8–0
1991–92	Red Star Belgrade	SR	(Cyprus) Apollon Limassol	3–1	2–0	5–1
1991–92	Red Star Belgrade	GS	(Belgium) Anderlecht	3–2	2–3	2nd out of 4
1991–92	Red Star Belgrade	GS	(Italy) Sampdoria	1–3	0–2	2nd out of 4
1991–92	Red Star Belgrade	GS	(Greece) Panathinaikos	1–0	2–0	2nd out of 4

===== FR Yugoslavia / Serbia and Montenegro era (1992–2006) =====
Season	Club	Round	Opponent	Home	Away	Agg.
1997–98	Partizan	QR1	Croatia Zagreb	1–0	0–5	1–5
1998–99	Obilić	QR1	(Iceland) ÍBV	2–0	2–1	4–1
1998–99	Obilić	QR2	(Germany) Bayern Munich	1–1	0–4	1–5
1999–2000	Partizan	QR1	(Estonia) Flora Tallinn	6–0	4–1	10–1
1999–2000	Partizan	QR2	(Croatia) Rijeka	3–1	3–0	6–1
1999–2000	Partizan	QR3	(Russia) Spartak Moscow	1–3	0–2	1–5
2000–01	Red Star Belgrade	QR1	(Faroe Islands) KÍ Klaksvík	2–0	3–0	5–0
2000–01	Red Star Belgrade	QR2	(Georgia (country)) Torpedo Kutaisi	4–0	0–2	4–2
2000–01	Red Star Belgrade	QR3	(Ukraine) Dynamo Kyiv	1–1	0–0	1–1 (a)
2001–02	Red Star Belgrade	QR2	(Cyprus) Omonia	2–1	1–1	3–2
2001–02	Red Star Belgrade	QR3	(Germany) Bayer Leverkusen	0–0	0–3	0–3
2002–03	Partizan	QR2	(Sweden) Hammarby IF	4–0	1–1	5–1
2002–03	Partizan	QR3	(Germany) Bayern Munich	0–3	1–3	1–6
2003–04	Partizan	QR2	(Sweden) Djurgårdens IF	1–1	2–2	3–3 (a)
2003–04	Partizan	QR3	(England) Newcastle United	0–1	1–0	1–1 (4–3 p)
2003–04	Partizan	GS	(France) Marseille	1–1	0–3	4th out of 4
2003–04	Partizan	GS	(Portugal) Porto	1–1	1–2	4th out of 4
2003–04	Partizan	GS	(Spain) Real Madrid	0–0	0–1	4th out of 4
2004–05	Red Star Belgrade	QR2	(Switzerland) Young Boys	3–0	2–2	5–2
2004–05	Red Star Belgrade	QR3	(Netherlands) PSV Eindhoven	3–2	0–5	3–7
2005–06	Partizan	QR2	(Moldova) Sheriff Tiraspol	1–0	1–0	2–0
2005–06	Partizan	QR3	(Slovakia) Artmedia Petržalka	0–0	0–0	0–0 (3–4 p)

===== Serbia era (2006–present) =====
Season	Club	Round	Opponent	Home	Away	Agg.
2006–07	Red Star Belgrade	QR2	(Republic of Ireland) Cork City	3–0	1–0	4–0
2006–07	Red Star Belgrade	QR3	(Italy) Milan	1–2	0–1	1–3
2007–08	Red Star Belgrade	QR2	(Estonia) Levadia	1–0	1–2	2–2 (a)
2007–08	Red Star Belgrade	QR3	(Scotland) Rangers	0–0	0–1	0–1
2008–09	Partizan	QR2	(Azerbaijan) Inter Baku	2–0	1–1	3–1
2008–09	Partizan	QR3	(Turkey) Fenerbahçe	2–2	1–2	3–4
2009–10	Partizan	QR2	(Wales) Rhyl	8–0	4–0	12–0
2009–10	Partizan	QR3	(Cyprus) APOEL	1–0	0–2	1–2
2010–11	Partizan	QR2	(Armenia) Pyunik	3–1	1–0	4–1
2010–11	Partizan	QR3	(Finland) HJK	3–0	2–1	5–1
2010–11	Partizan	PO	(Belgium) Anderlecht	2–2	2–2	4–4 (3–2 p)
2010–11	Partizan	GS	(England) Arsenal	1–3	1–3	4th out of 4
2010–11	Partizan	GS	(Ukraine) Shakhtar Donetsk	0–3	0–1	4th out of 4
2010–11	Partizan	GS	(Portugal) Braga	0–1	0–2	4th out of 4
2011–12	Partizan	QR2	(North Macedonia) KF Shkëndija	4–0	1–0	5–0
2011–12	Partizan	QR3	(Belgium) Genk	1–1	1–2	2–3
2012–13	Partizan	QR2	(Malta) Valletta	4–1	3–1	7–2
2012–13	Partizan	QR3	(Cyprus) AEL Limassol	0–1	0–1	0–2
2013–14	Partizan	QR2	(Armenia) Shirak	0–0	1–1	1–1 (a)
2013–14	Partizan	QR3	(Bulgaria) Ludogorets Razgrad	0–1	1–2	1–3
2014–15	Partizan	QR2	(Faroe Islands) HB	3–0	3–1	6–1
2014–15	Partizan	QR3	(Bulgaria) Ludogorets Razgrad	2–2	0–0	2–2 (a)
2015–16	Partizan	QR2	(Georgia (country)) Dila Gori	1–0	2–0	3–0
2015–16	Partizan	QR3	(Romania) Steaua București	4–2	1–1	5–3
2015–16	Partizan	PO	(Belarus) BATE Borisov	2–1	0–1	2–2 (a)
2016–17	Red Star Belgrade	QR2	(Malta) Valletta	2–1	2–1	4–2
2016–17	Red Star Belgrade	QR3	(Bulgaria) Ludogorets Razgrad	2–4	2–2	4–6
2017–18	Partizan	QR2	(Montenegro) Budućnost Podgorica	2–0	0–0	2–0
2017–18	Partizan	QR3	(Greece) Olympiacos	1–3	2–2	3–5
2018–19	Red Star Belgrade	QR1	(Latvia) Spartaks Jūrmala	2–0	0–0	2–0
2018–19	Red Star Belgrade	QR2	(Lithuania) Sūduva Marijampolė	3–0	2–0	5–0
2018–19	Red Star Belgrade	QR3	(Slovakia) Spartak Trnava	1–1	2–1	3–2
2018–19	Red Star Belgrade	PO	(Austria) Red Bull Salzburg	0–0	2–2	2–2 (a)
2018–19	Red Star Belgrade	GS	(England) Liverpool	2–0	0–4	4th out of 4
2018–19	Red Star Belgrade	GS	(France) Paris Saint-Germain	1–4	1–6	4th out of 4
2018–19	Red Star Belgrade	GS	(Italy) Napoli	0–0	1–3	4th out of 4
2019–20	Red Star Belgrade	QR1	(Lithuania) Sūduva Marijampolė	2–1	0–0	2–1
2019–20	Red Star Belgrade	QR2	(Finland) HJK	2–0	1–2	3–2
2019–20	Red Star Belgrade	QR3	(Denmark) Copenhagen	1–1	1–1	3–2 (7–6 p)
2019–20	Red Star Belgrade	PO	(Switzerland) Young Boys	1–1	2–2	3–3 (a)
2019–20	Red Star Belgrade	GS	(Greece) Olympiacos	3–1	0–1	4th out of 4
2019–20	Red Star Belgrade	GS	(England) Tottenham Hotspur	0–4	0–5	4th out of 4
2019–20	Red Star Belgrade	GS	(Germany) Bayern Munich	0–6	0–3	4th out of 4
2020–21	Red Star Belgrade	QR1	(Gibraltar) Europa	5–0	—N/a	5–0
2020–21	Red Star Belgrade	QR2	(Albania) Tirana	—N/a	1–0	1–0
2020–21	Red Star Belgrade	QR3	(Cyprus) Omonia	—N/a	1–1	1–1 (2–4 p)
2021–22	Red Star Belgrade	QR2	(Kazakhstan) Kairat	5–0	1–2	6–2
2021–22	Red Star Belgrade	QR3	(Moldova) Sheriff Tiraspol	1–1	0–1	1–2
2022–23	Red Star Belgrade	QR3	(Armenia) Pyunik	5–0	2–0	7–0
2022–23	Red Star Belgrade	PO	(Israel) Maccabi Haifa	2–2	2–3	4–5
2023–24	TSC Bačka Topola	QR3	(Portugal) Braga	1–4	0–3	1–7
2023–24	Red Star Belgrade	GS	(England) Manchester City	2–3	1–3	4th out of 4
2023–24	Red Star Belgrade	GS	(Germany) RB Leipzig	1–2	1–3	4th out of 4
2023–24	Red Star Belgrade	GS	(Switzerland) Young Boys	2–2	0–2	4th out of 4
2024–25	Red Star Belgrade	PO	(Norway) Bodø/Glimt	2–0	1–2	3–2
2024–25	Red Star Belgrade	GS	(Portugal) Benfica	1–2		29th out of 36
2024–25	Red Star Belgrade	GS	(Italy) Inter Milan		0–4	29th out of 36
2024–25	Red Star Belgrade	GS	(France) Monaco		1–5	29th out of 36
2024–25	Red Star Belgrade	GS	(Spain) Barcelona	2–5		29th out of 36
2024–25	Red Star Belgrade	GS	(Germany) Stuttgart	5–1		29th out of 36
2024–25	Red Star Belgrade	GS	(Italy) Milan		1–2	29th out of 36
2024–25	Red Star Belgrade	GS	(Netherlands) PSV	2–3		29th out of 36
2024–25	Red Star Belgrade	GS	(Switzerland) Young Boys		1–0	29th out of 36
2025–26	Red Star Belgrade	QR2	(Gibraltar) Lincoln Red Imps	5–1	1–0	6–1
2025–26	Red Star Belgrade	QR3	(Poland) Lech Poznań	1–1	3–1	4–2
2025–26	Red Star Belgrade	PO	(Cyprus) Pafos	1–2	1–1	2–3
2026–27	Red Star Belgrade	QR2	(Northern Ireland) Larne	5–0	4–0	9–0
2026–27	Red Star Belgrade	QR3	(Israel) Hapoel Be'er Sheva	0–2	0–1	0–3

==== UEFA Cup/Europa League ====
===== SFR Yugoslavia era (1971–1992) =====
Season	Club	Round	Opponent	Home	Away	Agg.
1971–72	OFK Beograd	FR	(Sweden) Djurgården IF	4–1	2–2	6–3
1971–72	OFK Beograd	SR	(East Germany) Carl Zeiss Jena	1–1	0–4	1–5
1972–73	Vojvodina	FR	(Czechoslovakia) Slovan Bratislava	1–2	0–6	1–8
1972–73	Red Star Belgrade	FR	(Switzerland) Lausanne-Sport	5–1	2–3	7–4
1972–73	Red Star Belgrade	SR	(Spain) Valencia	3–1	1–0	4–1
1972–73	Red Star Belgrade	R16	(England) Tottenham Hotspur	1–0	0–2	1–2
1972–73	OFK Beograd	FR	(Czechoslovakia) Dukla Prague	3–1	2–2	5–3
1972–73	OFK Beograd	SR	(Netherlands) Feyenoord	2–1	3–4	5–5 (a)
1972–73	OFK Beograd	R16	(Bulgaria) Beroe Stara Zagora	0–0	3–1	3–1
1972–73	OFK Beograd	QF	(Netherlands) Twente	3–2	0–2	3–4
1973–74	OFK Beograd	FR	(Greece) Panathinaikos	0–1	2–1	2–2 (a)
1973–74	OFK Beograd	SR	(Soviet Union) Dinamo Tbilisi	1–5	0–3	1–8
1974–75	Partizan	FR	(Poland) Górnik Zabrze	3–0	2–2	5–2
1974–75	Partizan	SR	(Northern Ireland) Portadown	5–0	1–1	6–1
1974–75	Partizan	R16	(Germany) 1. FC Köln	1–0	1–5	2–5
1975–76	Vojvodina	FR	(Greece) AEK Athens	0–0	1–3	1–3
1975–76	Red Star Belgrade	FR	(Romania) Universitatea Craiova	1–1	3–1	4–2
1975–76	Red Star Belgrade	SR	(Germany) Hamburger SV	1–1	0–4	1–5
1976–77	Red Star Belgrade	FR	(Bulgaria) Lokomotiv Plovdiv	4–1	1–2	5–3
1976–77	Red Star Belgrade	SR	Austria Salzburg	1–0	1–2	2–2 (a)
1976–77	Red Star Belgrade	R16	(Greece) AEK Athens	3–1	0–2	3–3 (a)
1978–79	Red Star Belgrade	FR	(East Germany) Dynamo Berlin	4–1	2–5	6–6 (a)
1978–79	Red Star Belgrade	SR	(Spain) Sporting Gijón	1–1	1–0	2–1
1978–79	Red Star Belgrade	R16	(England) Arsenal	1–0	1–1	2–1
1978–79	Red Star Belgrade	QF	(England) West Bromwich Albion	1–0	1–1	2–1
1978–79	Red Star Belgrade	SF	(Germany) Hertha BSC	1–0	1–2	2–2 (a)
1978–79	Red Star Belgrade	Final	(Germany) Borussia Mönchengladbach	1–1	0–1	1–2
1979–80	Red Star Belgrade	FR	(Turkey) Galatasaray	3–1	0–0	3–1
1979–80	Red Star Belgrade	SR	(East Germany) Carl Zeiss Jena	3–2	3–2	6–4
1979–80	Red Star Belgrade	R16	(Germany) Bayern Munich	3–2	0–2	3–4
1980–81	Napredak Kruševac	FR	(East Germany) Dynamo Dresden	0–1	0–1	0–2
1980–81	Radnički Niš	FR	(Austria) LASK Linz	2–1	4–1	6–2
1980–81	Radnički Niš	SR	(Bulgaria) Beroe Stara Zagora	1–0	2–1	3–1
1980–81	Radnički Niš	R16	(Netherlands) AZ	2–2	0–5	2–7
1981–82	Radnički Niš	FR	(Italy) Napoli	0–0	2–2	2–2 (a)
1981–82	Radnički Niš	SR	(Switzerland) Grasshoppers	2–0	0–2	2–2 (3-0 p)
1981–82	Radnički Niš	R16	(Netherlands) Feyenoord	2–0	0–1	2–1
1981–82	Radnički Niš	QF	(Scotland) Dundee United	3–0	0–2	3–2
1981–82	Radnički Niš	SF	(Germany) Hamburger SV	2–1	1–5	3–6
1983–84	Red Star Belgrade	FR	(Italy) Hellas Verona	2–3	0–1	3–4
1983–84	Radnički Niš	FR	(Switzerland) St. Gallen	3–0	2–1	5–1
1983–84	Radnički Niš	SR	(Czechoslovakia) Inter Bratislava	4–0	2–3	6–3
1983–84	Radnički Niš	R16	(Socialist Federal Republic of Yugoslavia) Hajduk Split	0–2	0–2	0–4
1984–85	Partizan	FR	(Malta) Rabat Ajax	2–0	2–0	4–0
1984–85	Partizan	SR	(England) Queens Park Rangers	4–0	2–6	6–6 (a)
1984–85	Partizan	R16	(Hungary) Videoton	2–0	0–5	2–5
1985–86	Partizan	FR	(Portugal) Portimonense	4–0	0–1	4–1
1985–86	Partizan	SR	(France) Nantes	1–1	0–4	1–5
1986–87	Partizan	FR	(Germany) Borussia Mönchengladbach	1–3	0–1	1–4
1987–88	Partizan	FR	(Albania) Flamurtari	2–1	0–2	2–3
1987–88	Red Star Belgrade	FR	(Bulgaria) Trakia Plovdiv	3–0	2–2	5–2
1987–88	Red Star Belgrade	SR	(Belgium) Club Brugge	3–1	0–4	3–5
1988–89	Partizan	FR	(Bulgaria) Slavia Sofia	5–0	5–0	10–0
1988–89	Partizan	SR	(Italy) Roma	4–2	0–2	4–4 (a)
1989–90	Rad	FR	(Greece) Olympiacos	2–1	0–2	2–3
1989–90	Red Star Belgrade	FR	(Turkey) Galatasaray	2–0	1–1	3–1
1989–90	Red Star Belgrade	SR	(Soviet Union) Žalgiris Vilnius	4–1	1–0	5–1
1989–90	Red Star Belgrade	QF	(Germany) 1. FC Köln	2–0	0–3	2–3
1990–91	Partizan	FR	(Malta) Hibernians	2–0	3–0	5–0
1990–91	Partizan	SR	(Spain) Real Sociedad	1–0	0–1	1–1 (5–4 p)
1990–91	Partizan	R16	(Italy) Internazionale	1–1	0–3	1–4
1991–92	Partizan	FR	(Spain) Sporting Gijón	2–0	0–2	2–2 (2–3 p)

===== FR Yugoslavia / Serbia and Montenegro era (1992–2006) =====
Season	Club	Round	Opponent	Home	Away	Agg.
1995–96	Red Star Belgrade	QR	(Switzerland) Neuchâtel Xamax	0–1	0–0	0–1
1996–97	Bečej	QR1	(Slovenia) Mura	0–0	0–2	0–2
1996–97	Vojvodina	QR1	(Northern Ireland) Portadown	4–1	1–0	5–1
1996–97	Vojvodina	QR2	(Austria) GAK	1–5	0–2	1–7
1996–97	Partizan	QR1	(Israel) Maccabi Haifa	3–1	1–0	4–1
1996–97	Partizan	QR2	(Romania) Național București	0–0	0–1	0–1
1997–98	Vojvodina	QR1	(Norway) Viking	0–2	2–0	2–2 (4–5 p)
1998–99	Obilić	FR	(Spain) Atlético Madrid	0–1	0–2	0–3
1998–99	Red Star Belgrade	QR1	(Georgia (country)) Kolkheti Poti	7–0	4–0	11–0
1998–99	Red Star Belgrade	QR2	(Russia) Rotor Volgograd	2–1	2–1	4–2
1998–99	Red Star Belgrade	FR	(France) Metz	2–1	1–2	3–3 (4–3 p)
1998–99	Red Star Belgrade	SR	(France) Lyon	1–2	2–3	3–5
1999–2000	Vojvodina	QR	(Hungary) Újpest	4–0	1–1	5–1
1999–2000	Vojvodina	FR	(Czech Republic) Slavia Prague	0–0	2–3	2–3
1999–2000	Red Star Belgrade	QR	(Azerbaijan) Neftchi Baku	1–0	3–2	4–2
1999–2000	Red Star Belgrade	FR	(France) Montpellier	0–1	2–2	2–3
1999–2000	Partizan	R1	(England) Leeds United	1–3	0–1	1–4
2000–01	Napredak Kruševac	QR	(Estonia) Viljandi Tulevik	5–1	1–1	6–2
2000–01	Napredak Kruševac	FR	(Greece) OFI Crete	0–0	0–6	0–6
2000–01	Red Star Belgrade	FR	(England) Leicester City	3–1	1–1	4–2
2000–01	Red Star Belgrade	SR	(Spain) Celta Vigo	1–0	3–5	4–5
2000–01	Partizan	QR	(Malta) Sliema Wanderers	4–1	1–2	5–3
2000–01	Partizan	FR	(Portugal) Porto	1–1	0–1	1–2
2001–02	Obilić	QR	(Faroe Islands) GÍ Gøta	4–0	1–1	5–1
2001–02	Obilić	FR	(Denmark) Copenhagen	2–2	0–2	2–4
2001–02	Red Star Belgrade	FR	(Ukraine) CSKA Kyiv	0–0	2–3	2–3
2001–02	Partizan	QR	(Andorra) Santa Coloma	7–1	1–0	8–1
2001–02	Partizan	FR	(Austria) Rapid Wien	1–0	0–5	1–5
2002–03	Sartid	QR	(Wales) Bangor City	2–0	0–1	2–1
2002–03	Sartid	FR	(England) Ipswich Town	0–1	1–1	1–2
2002–03	Red Star Belgrade	QR	(Kazakhstan) Kairat	3–0	2–0	5–0
2002–03	Red Star Belgrade	FR	(Italy) Chievo	0–0	2–0	2–0
2002–03	Red Star Belgrade	SR	(Italy) Lazio	1–1	0–1	1–2
2002–03	Partizan	FR	(Portugal) Sporting CP	3–3	3–1	6–4
2002–03	Partizan	SR	(Czech Republic) Slavia Prague	3–1	1–5	4–6
2003–04	Sartid	QR	(Bosnia and Herzegovina) Sarajevo	3–0	1–1	4–1
2003–04	Sartid	FR	(Czech Republic) Slavia Prague	1–2	1–2	2–4
2003–04	Red Star Belgrade	QR	(Moldova) Nistru Otaci	5–0	3–2	8–2
2003–04	Red Star Belgrade	FR	(Denmark) OB	4–3	2–2	6–5
2003–04	Red Star Belgrade	SR	(Norway) Rosenborg	0–1	0–0	0–1
2004–05	Budućnost Banatski Dvor	QR2	(Slovenia) Maribor	1–2	1–0	2–2 (a)
2004–05	Železnik	QR2	(Romania) Steaua București	2–4	2–1	4–5
2004–05	Red Star Belgrade	FR	(Russia) Zenit Saint Petersburg	1–2	0–4	1–6
2004–05	Partizan	QR2	(Romania) Oțelul Galați	1–0	0–0	1–0
2004–05	Partizan	FR	(Romania) Dinamo București	3–1	0–0	3–1
2004–05	Partizan	GS	(Greece) Egaleo	4–0	—N/a	3rd out of 5
2004–05	Partizan	GS	(Italy) Lazio	—N/a	2–2	3rd out of 5
2004–05	Partizan	GS	(Spain) Villarreal	1–1	—N/a	3rd out of 5
2004–05	Partizan	GS	(England) Middlesbrough	—N/a	0–3	3rd out of 5
2004–05	Partizan	R32	(Ukraine) Dnipro Dnipropetrovsk	2–2	1–0	3–2
2004–05	Partizan	R16	(Russia) CSKA Moscow	1–1	0–2	1–3
2005–06	OFK Beograd	QR2	(Bulgaria) Lokomotiv Plovdiv	2–1	0–1	2–2 (a)
2005–06	Partizan	FR	(Israel) Maccabi Petah Tikva	2–5	2–0	4–5
2005–06	Red Star Belgrade	QR2	(Croatia) Inter Zaprešić	4–0	3–1	7–1
2005–06	Red Star Belgrade	FR	(Portugal) Braga	0–0	1–1	1–1 (a)
2005–06	Red Star Belgrade	GS	(Switzerland) Basel	1–2	—N/a	4th out of 5
2005–06	Red Star Belgrade	GS	(Norway) Tromsø	—N/a	1–3	4th out of 5
2005–06	Red Star Belgrade	GS	(Italy) Roma	3–1	—N/a	4th out of 5
2005–06	Red Star Belgrade	GS	(France) Strasbourg	—N/a	2–2	4th out of 5

===== Serbia era (2006–present) =====
Season	Club	Round	Opponent	Home	Away	Agg.
2006–07	Hajduk Kula	QR2	(Bulgaria) CSKA Sofia	1–1	0–0	1–1 (a)
2006–07	OFK Beograd	QR2	(France) Auxerre	1–0	1–5	2–5
2006–07	Red Star Belgrade	FR	(Czech Republic) Slovan Liberec	1–2	0–2	1–4
2006–07	Partizan	QR2	(Slovenia) Maribor	2–1	1–1	3–2
2006–07	Partizan	FR	(Netherlands) Groningen	4–2	0–1	2–1
2006–07	Partizan	GS	(Italy) Livorno	1–1	—N/a	5th out of 5
2006–07	Partizan	GS	(Israel) Maccabi Haifa	—N/a	0–1	5th out of 5
2006–07	Partizan	GS	(France) Auxerre	1–4	—N/a	5th out of 5
2006–07	Partizan	GS	(Scotland) Rangers	—N/a	0–1	5th out of 5
2007–08	Bežanija	QR1	(Albania) Besa Kavajë	2–2	0–0	2–2 (a)
2007–08	Vojvodina	QR1	(Malta) Hibernians	5–1	2–0	7–1
2007–08	Vojvodina	QR2	(Spain) Atlético Madrid	1–2	0–3	1–5
2007–08	Partizan	QR1	(Bosnia and Herzegovina) Zrinjski Mostar	5–0	6–1	11–1^{1}
2007–08	Red Star Belgrade	FR	(Poland) Dyskobolia Grodzisk	1–0	1–0	2–0
2007–08	Red Star Belgrade	GS	(Germany) Bayern Munich	2–3	—N/a	5th out of 5
2007–08	Red Star Belgrade	GS	(Greece) Aris	—N/a	0–3	5th out of 5
2007–08	Red Star Belgrade	GS	(England) Bolton Wanderers	0–1	—N/a	5th out of 5
2007–08	Red Star Belgrade	GS	(Portugal) Braga	—N/a	0–2	5th out of 5
2008–09	Borac Čačak	QR1	(Moldova) Dacia Chişinău	3–1	1–1	4–2
2008–09	Borac Čačak	QR2	(Bulgaria) Lokomotiv Sofia	1–0	1–1	2–1
2008–09	Borac Čačak	FR	(Netherlands) Ajax	1–4	0–2	1–6
2008–09	Vojvodina	QR1	(Azerbaijan) Olimpik Baku	1–0	1–1	2–1
2008–09	Vojvodina	QR2	(Israel) Hapoel Tel Aviv	0–0	0–3	0–3
2008–09	Red Star Belgrade	QR2	(Cyprus) APOEL	3–3	2–2	5–5 (a)
2008–09	Partizan	FR	(Romania) Timișoara	1–0	2–1	3–1
2008–09	Partizan	GS	(Italy) Sampdoria	1–2	—N/a	5th out of 5
2008–09	Partizan	GS	(Germany) VfB Stuttgart	—N/a	0–2	5th out of 5
2008–09	Partizan	GS	(Belgium) Standard Liège	0–1	—N/a	5th out of 5
2008–09	Partizan	GS	(Spain) Sevilla	—N/a	0–3	5th out of 5
2009–10	Sevojno	QR2	(Lithuania) Kaunas	0–0	1–1	1–1 (a)
2009–10	Sevojno	QR3	(France) Lille	0–2	0–2	0–4
2009–10	Red Star Belgrade	QR2	(Slovenia) Rudar Velenje	4–0	1–0	5–0
2009–10	Red Star Belgrade	QR3	(Georgia (country)) Dinamo Tbilisi	5–2	0–2	5–4
2009–10	Red Star Belgrade	PO	(Czech Republic) Slavia Prague	2–1	0–3	2–4
2009–10	Vojvodina	QR3	Austria Wien	1–1	2–4	3–5
2009–10	Partizan	PO	(Slovakia) MŠK Žilina	1–1	2–0	3–1
2009–10	Partizan	GS	(Ukraine) Shakhtar Donetsk	1–0	1–4	4th out of 4
2009–10	Partizan	GS	(France) Toulouse	2–3	0–1	4th out of 4
2009–10	Partizan	GS	(Belgium) Club Brugge	2–4	0–2	4th out of 4
2010–11	OFK Beograd	QR2	(Belarus) Torpedo Zhodino	2–2	1–0	3–2
2010–11	OFK Beograd	QR3	(Turkey) Galatasaray	1–5	2–2	3–7
2010–11	Spartak Subotica	QR2	(Luxembourg) Differdange	2–0	3–3	5–3
2010–11	Spartak Subotica	QR3	(Ukraine) Dnipro Dnipropetrovsk	2–1	0–2	2–3
2010–11	Red Star Belgrade	QR3	(Slovakia) Slovan Bratislava	1–2	1–1	2–3
2011–12	Rad	QR1	(San Marino) Tre Penne	6–0	3–1	9–1
2011–12	Rad	QR2	(Greece) Olympiacos Volos	0–1	1–1	1–2
2011–12	Vojvodina	QR2	(Liechtenstein) Vaduz	1–3	2–0	3–3 (a)
2011–12	Red Star Belgrade	QR3	(Latvia) Ventspils	7–0	2–1	9–1
2011–12	Red Star Belgrade	PO	(France) Rennes	1–2	0–4	1–6
2011–12	Partizan	PO	(Republic of Ireland) Shamrock Rovers	1–2	1–1	2–3
2012–13	Jagodina	QR2	(Kazakhstan) Ordabasy	0–1	0–0	0–1
2012–13	Vojvodina	QR2	(Belarus) Sūduva Marijampolė	1–1	4–0	5–1
2012–13	Vojvodina	QR3	(Austria) Rapid Wien	2–1	0–2	2–3
2012–13	Red Star Belgrade	QR2	(Belarus) Naftan Novopolotsk	3–3	4–3	7–6
2012–13	Red Star Belgrade	QR3	(Cyprus) Omonia	0–0	0–0	0–0 (6–5 p)
2012–13	Red Star Belgrade	PO	(France) Bordeaux	0–0	2–3	2–3
2012–13	Partizan	PO	(Norway) Tromsø	1–0	2–3	3–3 (a)
2012–13	Partizan	GS	(Azerbaijan) Neftchi Baku	0–0	1–1	3rd out of 4
2012–13	Partizan	GS	(Italy) Internazionale	1–3	0–1	3rd out of 4
2012–13	Partizan	GS	(Russia) Rubin Kazan	1–1	0–2	3rd out of 4
2013–14	Vojvodina	QR1	(Malta) Hibernians	3–2	4–1	7–3
2013–14	Vojvodina	QR2	(Hungary) Budapest Honvéd	2–0	3–1	5–1
2013–14	Vojvodina	QR3	(Turkey) Bursaspor	2–2	3–0	5–2
2013–14	Vojvodina	PO	(Moldova) Sheriff Tiraspol	1–1	1–2	2–3
2013–14	Jagodina	QR2	(Russia) Rubin Kazan	2–3	0–1	2–4
2013–14	Red Star Belgrade	QR2	(Iceland) ÍBV	2–0	0–0	2–0
2013–14	Red Star Belgrade	QR3	(Ukraine) Chornomorets Odesa	0–0	1–3	1–3
2013–14	Partizan	PO	(Switzerland) Thun	1–0	0–3	1–3
2014–15	Čukarički	QR1	(Andorra) Sant Julià	4–0	0–0	4–0
2014–15	Čukarički	QR2	(Austria) Grödig	0–4	2–1	2–5
2014–15	Vojvodina	QR2	(Slovakia) Trenčín	3–0	0–4	3–4
2014–15	Jagodina	QR2	(Romania) CFR Cluj	0–1	0–0	0–1
2014–15	Partizan	PO	(Azerbaijan) Neftchi Baku	3–2	2–1	5–3
2014–15	Partizan	GS	(England) Tottenham Hotspur	0–0	0–1	4th out of 4
2014–15	Partizan	GS	(Turkey) Beşiktaş	0–4	1–2	4th out of 4
2014–15	Partizan	GS	(Greece) Asteras Tripolis	0–0	0–2	4th out of 4
2015–16	Čukarički	QR1	(Slovenia) Domžale	0–0	1–0	1–0
2015–16	Čukarički	QR2	(Azerbaijan) Gabala	1–0	0–2	1–2
2015–16	Vojvodina	QR1	(Hungary) MTK Budapest	3–1	0–0	3–1
2015–16	Vojvodina	QR2	(Latvia) Spartaks Jūrmala	3–0	1–1	4–1
2015–16	Vojvodina	QR3	(Italy) Sampdoria	0–2	4–0	4–2
2015–16	Vojvodina	PO	(Czech Republic) Viktoria Plzeň	0–3	0–2	0–5
2015–16	Red Star Belgrade	QR1	(Kazakhstan) Kairat	0–2	1–2	1–4
2015–16	Partizan	GS	(Spain) Athletic Bilbao	0–2	1–5	3rd out of 4
2015–16	Partizan	GS	(Germany) FC Augsburg	1–3	3–1	3rd out of 4
2015–16	Partizan	GS	(Netherlands) AZ	3–2	2–1	3rd out of 4
2016–17	Čukarički	QR1	(Kazakhstan) Ordabasy	3–0	3–3	6–3
2016–17	Čukarički	QR2	(Hungary) Videoton	1–1	0–2	1–3
2016–17	Vojvodina	QR1	(Montenegro) Bokelj	5–0	1–1	6–1
2016–17	Vojvodina	QR2	(Wales) Connah's Quay Nomads	1–0	2–1	3–1
2016–17	Vojvodina	QR3	(Belarus) Dinamo Minsk	1–1	2–0	3–1
2016–17	Vojvodina	PO	(Netherlands) AZ	0–3	0–0	0–3
2016–17	Red Star Belgrade	PO	(Italy) Sassuolo	1–1	0–3	1–4
2016–17	Partizan	QR2	(Poland) Zagłębie Lubin	0–0	0–0	0–0 (3–4 p)
2017–18	Mladost Lučani	QR1	(Azerbaijan) Inter Baku	0–3	0–2	0–5
2017–18	Vojvodina	QR1	(Slovakia) Ružomberok	2–1	0–2	2–3
2017–18	Red Star Belgrade	QR1	(Malta) Floriana	3–0	3–3	6–3
2017–18	Red Star Belgrade	QR2	(Kazakhstan) Irtysh Pavlodar	2–0	1–1	3–1
2017–18	Red Star Belgrade	QR3	(Czech Republic) Sparta Prague	2–0	1–0	3–0
2017–18	Red Star Belgrade	PO	(Russia) Krasnodar	2–1	2–3	4–4 (a)
2017–18	Red Star Belgrade	GS	(England) Arsenal	0–1	0–0	2nd out of 4
2017–18	Red Star Belgrade	GS	(Belarus) BATE Borisov	1–1	0–0	2nd out of 4
2017–18	Red Star Belgrade	GS	(Germany) 1. FC Köln	1–0	1–0	2nd out of 4
2017–18	Red Star Belgrade	R32	(Russia) CSKA Moscow	0–0	0–1	0–1
2017–18	Partizan	PO	(Hungary) Videoton	0–0	4–0	4–0
2017–18	Partizan	GS	(Ukraine) Dynamo Kyiv	2–3	1–4	2nd out of 4
2017–18	Partizan	GS	(Switzerland) Young Boys	2–1	1–1	2nd out of 4
2017–18	Partizan	GS	(Albania) Skënderbeu Korçë	2–0	0–0	2nd out of 4
2017–18	Partizan	R32	(Czech Republic) Viktoria Plzeň	1–1	0–2	1–3
2018–19	Radnički Niš	QR1	(Malta) Gżira United	4–0	1–0	5–0
2018–19	Radnički Niš	QR2	(Israel) Maccabi Tel Aviv	2–2	0–2	2–4
2018–19	Spartak Subotica	QR1	(Northern Ireland) Coleraine	1–1	2–0	3–1
2018–19	Spartak Subotica	QR2	(Czech Republic) Sparta Prague	2–0	1–2	3–2
2018–19	Spartak Subotica	QR3	(Denmark) Brøndby	0–2	1–2	1–4
2018–19	Partizan	QR1	(Montenegro) Rudar Pljevlja	3–0	3–0	6–0
2018–19	Partizan	QR2	(Lithuania) Trakai	1–0	1–1	2–1
2018–19	Partizan	QR3	(Denmark) Nordsjælland	3–2	2–1	5–3
2018–19	Partizan	PO	(Turkey) Beşiktaş	1–1	0–3	1–4
2019–20	Radnički Niš	QR1	(Estonia) Flora	2–2	0–2	2–4
2019–20	Čukarički	QR1	(Armenia) Banants	3–0	5–0	8–0
2019–20	Čukarički	QR2	(Norway) Molde	1–3	0–0	1–3
2019–20	Partizan	QR2	(Wales) Connah's Quay Nomads	3–0	1–0	4–0
2019–20	Partizan	QR3	(Turkey) Yeni Malatyaspor	3–1	0–1	3–2
2019–20	Partizan	PO	(Norway) Molde	2–1	1–1	3–2
2019–20	Partizan	GS	(Kazakhstan) Astana	4–1	2–1	3rd out of 4
2019–20	Partizan	GS	(Netherlands) AZ	2–2	2–2	3rd out of 4
2019–20	Partizan	GS	(England) Manchester United	0–1	0–3	3rd out of 4
2020–21	TSC Bačka Topola	QR1	(Moldova) Petrocub Hîncești	—N/a	2–0	2–0
2020–21	TSC Bačka Topola	QR2	(Romania) FCSB	6–6	—N/a	6–6 (4–5 p)
2020–21	Vojvodina	QR3	(Belgium) Standard Liège	—N/a	1–2	1–2
2020–21	Partizan	QR1	(Latvia) RFS	1–0	—N/a	1–0
2020–21	Partizan	QR2	(Moldova) Sfântul Gheorghe	—N/a	1–0	1–0
2020–21	Partizan	QR3	(Belgium) Charleroi	—N/a	1–2	1–2
2020–21	Red Star Belgrade	PO	Ararat-Armenia	—N/a	2–1	2–1
2020–21	Red Star Belgrade	GS	(Belgium) Gent	2–1	2–0	2nd out of 4
2020–21	Red Star Belgrade	GS	(Germany) 1899 Hoffenheim	0–0	0–2	2nd out of 4
2020–21	Red Star Belgrade	GS	(Czech Republic) Slovan Liberec	5–1	0–0	2nd out of 4
2020–21	Red Star Belgrade	R32	(Italy) Milan	2–2	1–1	3–3 (a)
2021–22	Red Star Belgrade	PO	(Romania) CFR Cluj	4–0	2–1	6–1
2021–22	Red Star Belgrade	GS	(Portugal) Braga	2–1	1–1	1st out of 4
2021–22	Red Star Belgrade	GS	(Bulgaria) Ludogorets Razgrad	1–0	1–0	1st out of 4
2021–22	Red Star Belgrade	GS	(Denmark) Midtjylland	0–1	1–1	1st out of 4
2021–22	Red Star Belgrade	R16	(Scotland) Rangers	2–1	0–3	2–4
2022–23	Partizan	QR3	(Cyprus) AEK Larnaca	2–2	1–2	3–4
2022–23	Red Star Belgrade	GS	(France) Monaco	0–1	1–4	4th out of 4
2022–23	Red Star Belgrade	GS	(Turkey) Trabzonspor	2–1	1–2	4th out of 4
2022–23	Red Star Belgrade	GS	(Hungary) Ferencváros	4–1	1–2	4th out of 4
2023–24	Čukarički	PO	(Greece) Olympiacos	0–3	1–3	1–6
2023–24	TSC Bačka Topola	GS	(England) West Ham United	0–1	1–3	4th out of 4
2023–24	TSC Bačka Topola	GS	(Greece) Olympiacos	2–2	2–5	4th out of 4
2023–24	TSC Bačka Topola	GS	(Germany) Freiburg	1–3	0–5	4th out of 4
2024–25	Vojvodina	QR2	(Netherlands) Ajax	1–3	0–1	1–4
2024–25	Partizan	QR3	(Switzerland) Lugano	2–2	0–1	2–3 (a.e.t)
2024–25	TSC	PO	(Israel) Maccabi Tel Aviv	1–5	0–3	1–8
2025–26	Partizan	QR1	(Cyprus) AEK Larnaca	2–1 (a.e.t.)	0–1	2–2 (6–5 p)
2025–26	Red Star Belgrade	LP	(Scotland) Celtic	1–1	—	15th out of 36
2025–26	Red Star Belgrade	LP	(Portugal) Porto	—	1–2	15th out of 36
2025–26	Red Star Belgrade	LP	(Portugal) Braga	—	0–2	15th out of 36
2025–26	Red Star Belgrade	LP	(France) Lille	1–0	—	15th out of 36
2025–26	Red Star Belgrade	LP	(Romania) FCSB	1–0	—	15th out of 36
2025–26	Red Star Belgrade	LP	(Austria) Sturm Graz	—	1–0	15th out of 36
2025–26	Red Star Belgrade	LP	(Sweden) Malmö FF	—	1–0	15th out of 36
2025–26	Red Star Belgrade	LP	(Spain) Celta Vigo	1–1	—	15th out of 36
2025–26	Red Star Belgrade	KP PO	(France) Lille	0–2 (a.e.t.)	1–0	1–2
2026–27	Vojvodina	QR1	(Hungary) Ferencvárosi	1–2	0–3	1–5
2026–27	Red Star Belgrade	PO	(Czech Republic) Viktoria Plzeň	3–0	1–5 (a.e.t.)	4–5

^{1} UEFA expelled Partizan from the 2007–08 UEFA Cup due to crowd trouble at their away tie in Mostar, which forced the match to be interrupted for 10 minutes. UEFA adjudged travelling Partizan fans to have been the culprits of the trouble, but Partizan were allowed to play the return leg while the appeal was being processed. However, Partizan's appeal was rejected so Zrinjski Mostar qualified.

==== UEFA Europa Conference League ====
Season	Club	Round	Opponent	Home	Away	Agg.
2021–22	Čukarički	QR2	(Azerbaijan) Sumgayit	0–0	2–0	2–0
2021–22	Čukarički	QR3	(Sweden) Hammarby	3–1	1–5	4–6
2021–22	Partizan	QR2	(Slovakia) DAC Dunajská Streda	1–0	2–0	3–0
2021–22	Partizan	QR3	(Russia) Sochi	2–2	1–1	3–3 (4–2 p)
2021–22	Partizan	PO	(Portugal) Santa Clara	2–0	1–2	3–2
2021–22	Partizan	GS	(Belgium) Gent	0–1	1–1	2nd out of 4
2021–22	Partizan	GS	(Estonia) Flora	2–0	0–1	2nd out of 4
2021–22	Partizan	GS	(Cyprus) Anorthosis Famagusta	1–1	2–0	2nd out of 4
2021–22	Partizan	KPO	(Czech Republic) Sparta Prague	2–1	1–0	3–1
2021–22	Partizan	R16	(Netherlands) Feyenoord	2–5	1–3	3–8
2021–22	Vojvodina	QR2	(Lithuania) Panevėžys	1–0	1–0	2–0
2021–22	Vojvodina	QR3	(Austria) LASK	0–1	1–6	1–7
2022–23	Radnički Niš	QR2	(Malta) Gżira United	3–3	2–2	5–5 (1–3 p)
2022–23	Čukarički	QR2	(Luxembourg) Racing Union	4–0	4–1	8–1
2022–23	Čukarički	QR2	(Netherlands) Twente	1–3	1–4	2–7
2022–23	Partizan	PO	(Malta) Ħamrun Spartans	4–1	3–3	7–4
2022–23	Partizan	GS	(Czech Republic) Slovácko	1–1	3–3	2nd of 4
2022–23	Partizan	GS	(France) Nice	1–1	1–2	2nd of 4
2022–23	Partizan	GS	(Germany) 1. FC Köln	2–0	1–0	2nd of 4
2022–23	Partizan	KPO	(Moldova) Sheriff Tiraspol	1–3	1–0	2–3
2023–24	Vojvodina	QR2	(Cyprus) APOEL	1–2	1–2	2–4
2023–24	Partizan	QR3	(Azerbaijan) Sabah	2–0	0–2	2–2 (5–4 p)
2023–24	Partizan	PO	(Denmark) Nordsjælland	0–1	0–5	0–6
2023–24	Čukarički	GS	(Hungary) Ferencváros	1–2	1–3	4th out of 4
2023–24	Čukarički	GS	(Italy) Fiorentina	0–1	0–6	4th out of 4
2023–24	Čukarički	GS	(Belgium) Genk	0–2	0–2	4th out of 4
2024–25	Partizan	PO	(Belgium) Gent	0–1	0–1	0–2
2024–25	Radnički 1923	QR2	(Montenegro) Mornar Bar	1–0	1–2	2–2 (3–4 p)
2024–25	TSC	LP	(Kazakhstan) Astana		0–1	24th out of 36
2024–25	TSC	LP	(Poland) Legia Warsaw	0–3		24th out of 36
2024–25	TSC	LP	(Switzerland) Lugano	4–1		24th out of 36
2024–25	TSC	LP	(Switzerland) St. Gallen		2–2	24th out of 36
2024–25	TSC	LP	(Belgium) Gent		0–3	24th out of 36
2024–25	TSC	LP	(Armenia) Noah	4–3		24th out of 36
2024–25	TSC	KPO	(Poland) Jagiellonia Białystok	1–3	1–3	2–6
2024–25	Vojvodina	QR3	(Slovenia) Maribor	1–0	1–2	2–2 (2–4 p)
2025–26	Radnički 1923	QR2	(Faroe Islands) KÍ	0–0	0–1	0–1
2025–26	Novi Pazar	QR2	(Poland) Jagiellonia Białystok	1–2	1–3	2–5
2025–26	Partizan	QR2	(Ukraine) Oleksandriya	4–0	2–0	6–0
2025–26	Partizan	QR3	(Scotland) Hibernian	0–2	3–2 (a.e.t.)	3–4
2026–27	Železničar Pančevo	QR2	(Portugal) Braga	0–1	0–4	0–5
2026–27	Vojvodina	QR2	(Netherlands) Ajax	1–4	1–4	2–8
2026–27	Partizan	QR2	(Luxembourg) UNA Strassen	4–0	1–0	5–0
2026–27	Partizan	QR3	(Kazakhstan) Tobol	3–0	2–1	5–1
2026–27	Partizan	PO	(Spain) Getafe	2–1	1–3	3–4
2026–27	Red Star Belgrade	LP	(Switzerland) Lugano	—N/a	2–3	TBD
2026–27	Red Star Belgrade	LP	(Denmark) Copenhagen	22 Oct	—N/a	TBD
2026–27	Red Star Belgrade	LP	(Andorra) Inter Club d'Escaldes	5 Nov	—N/a	TBD
2026–27	Red Star Belgrade	LP	(Belgium) Gent	—N/a	26 Nov	TBD
2026–27	Red Star Belgrade	LP	(Georgia (country)) Iberia 1999	—N/a	10 Dec	TBD
2026–27	Red Star Belgrade	LP	(Turkey) Trabzonspor	17 Dec	—N/a	TBD

=== Defunct ===
==== Inter-Cities Fairs Cup ====
===== SFR Yugoslavia era (1958–1971) =====
Season	Club	Round	Opponent	Home	Away	Agg.
1958–60	Belgrade XI	R1	(Switzerland) Lausanne Sports	6–1	5–3	11–4
1958–60	Belgrade XI	QF	(England) Chelsea	4–1	0–1	4–2
1958–60	Belgrade XI	SF	(Spain) Barcelona	1–1	1–3	2–4
1960–61	Belgrade XI	R1	(East Germany) Leipzig XI	4–1	2–5	6–6^{1}
1960–61	Belgrade XI	QF	(Italy) Internazionale	1–0	0–5	1–5
1961–62	Novi Sad XI	R1	(Italy) Milan	2–0	0–0	2–0
1961–62	Novi Sad XI	R2	(Greece) Iraklis	9–1	1–2	10–3
1961–62	Novi Sad XI	QF	(Hungary) MTK	1–4	1–2	2–6
1961–62	Red Star Belgrade	R1	(Switzerland) Basel XI	4–1	1–1	5–2
1961–62	Red Star Belgrade	R2	(Scotland) Hibernian	4–0	1–0	5–0
1961–62	Red Star Belgrade	QF	(Spain) Espanyol	5–0	1–2	6–2
1961–62	Red Star Belgrade	SF	(Spain) Barcelona	0–2	1–4	1–6
1962–63	Vojvodina	R1	(East Germany) Leipzig XI	1–0	0–2	1–2
1962–63	Red Star Belgrade	R1	(Austria) Rapid Wien	1–0	1–1	2–1
1962–63	Red Star Belgrade	R2	(Spain) Barcelona	3–2	0–1	3–3^{2}
1962–63	Red Star Belgrade	QF	(Italy) Roma	2–0	0–3	2–3
1963–64	OFK Beograd	R1	(Italy) Juventus	2–1	1–2	3–3^{3}
1964–65	OFK Beograd	R1	(Spain) Athletic Bilbao	0–2	2–2	2–4
1964–65	Vojvodina	R1	(Bulgaria) Lokomotiv Plovdiv	1–1	1–1	2–2^{4}
1965–66	Red Star Belgrade	R1	(Italy) Fiorentina	0–4	1–3	1–7
1966–67	Red Star Belgrade	R1	(Spain) Athletic Bilbao	5–0	0–2	5–2
1966–67	Red Star Belgrade	R2	(Spain) Valencia	1–2	0–1	1–3
1967–68	Vojvodina	R1	(Portugal) GD CUF	1–0	3–1	4–1
1967–68	Vojvodina	R2	(East Germany) Lokomotive Leipzig	0–0	2–0	2–0
1967–68	Vojvodina	R3	(Turkey) Göztepe	1–0	1–0	2–0
1967–68	Vojvodina	QF	(Italy) Bologna	0–2	0–0	0–2
1967–68	Partizan	R1	(Bulgaria) Lokomotiv Plovdiv	5–1	1–1	6–1
1967–68	Partizan	R2	(England) Leeds United	1–2	1–1	2–3
1968–69	OFK Beograd	R1	(Romania) Rapid București	6–1	1–3	7–4
1968–69	OFK Beograd	R2	(Italy) Bologna	1–0	1–1	2–1
1968–69	OFK Beograd	R3	(Turkey) Göztepe	3–1	0–2	3–3 (a)
1968–69	Vojvodina	R1	(Scotland) Rangers	1–0	0–2	1–2
1969–70	Vojvodina	R1	(Poland) Gwardia Warszawa	0–1	1–1	1–2
1969–70	Partizan	R1	(Hungary) Újpest Dózsa	2–1	0–2	2–3
1970–71	Partizan	R1	(East Germany) Dynamo Dresden	0–0	0–6	0–6

^{1} Belgrade XI progressed to the Quarter finals after beating Leipzig XI 2–0 on a play-off match.

^{2} Red Star Belgrade progressed to the Quarter finals after winning a play-off match 1–0.

^{3} Juventus won 1–0 in a play-off to advance to the second round.

^{4} Lokomotiv Plovdiv won 2–0 in a play-off to advance to the second round.

==== Cup Winners' Cup ====
===== SFR Yugoslavia era (1960–1992) =====
Season	Club	Round	Opponent	Home	Away	Agg.
1962–63	OFK Beograd	QR	(East Germany) Chemie Halle	2–0	3–3	5–3
1962–63	OFK Beograd	FR	(Northern Ireland) Portadown	5–1	2–3	7–4
1962–63	OFK Beograd	QF	(Italy) Napoli	2–0	1–3	3–3 (3–1 playoff)
1962–63	OFK Beograd	SF	(England) Tottenham Hotspur	1–2	1–3	2–5
1966–67	OFK Beograd	FR	(Soviet Union) Spartak Moscow	1–3	0–3	1–6
1968–69	Bor	FR	(Czechoslovakia) Slovan Bratislava	2–0	0–3	2–3
1971–72	Red Star Belgrade	FR	(Hungary) Komlói Bányász	1–2	7–2	8–4
1971–72	Red Star Belgrade	SR	(Netherlands) Sparta Rotterdam	2–1	1–1	3–2
1971–72	Red Star Belgrade	QF	(Soviet Union) Dynamo Moscow	1–2	1–1	2–3
1974–75	Red Star Belgrade	FR	(Greece) PAOK	2–0	0–1	2–1
1974–75	Red Star Belgrade	SR	(Luxembourg) Avenir Beggen	5–1	6–1	11–2
1974–75	Red Star Belgrade	QF	(Spain) Real Madrid	2–0	0–2	2–2 (6–5 p)
1974–75	Red Star Belgrade	SF	(Hungary) Ferencváros	2–2	1–2	3–4
1982–83	Red Star Belgrade	FR	(Norway) Lillestrøm	3–0	4–0	7–0
1982–83	Red Star Belgrade	SR	(Spain) Barcelona	2–4	1–2	3–6
1985–86	Red Star Belgrade	FR	(Switzerland) Aarau	2–0	2–2	4–2
1985–86	Red Star Belgrade	SR	(Denmark) Lyngby	3–1	2–2	5–3
1985–86	Red Star Belgrade	QF	(Spain) Atlético Madrid	0–2	1–1	1–3
1989–90	Partizan	FR	(Scotland) Celtic	2–1	4–5	6–6 (a)
1989–90	Partizan	SR	(Netherlands) Groningen	3–1	3–4	6–5
1989–90	Partizan	QF	(Romania) Dinamo București	0–2	1–2	1–4

===== FR Yugoslavia era (1992–1999) =====
Season	Club	Round	Opponent	Home	Away	Agg.
1995–96	Obilić	QR	(Georgia (country)) Dinamo Batumi	0–1	2–2	2–3
1996–97	Red Star Belgrade	QR	(Scotland) Heart of Midlothian	0–0	1–1	1–1 (a)
1996–97	Red Star Belgrade	FR	(Germany) 1. FC Kaiserslautern	4–0	0–1	4–1
1996–97	Red Star Belgrade	SR	(Spain) Barcelona	1–1	1–3	2–4
1997–98	Red Star Belgrade	QR	(Finland) HJK	3–0	0–1	3–1
1997–98	Red Star Belgrade	FR	(Belgium) Germinal Ekeren	1–1	2–3	3–4
1998–99	Partizan	QR	(Georgia (country)) Dinamo Batumi	2–0	0–1	2–1
1998–99	Partizan	FR	(England) Newcastle United	1–0	1–2	2–2 (a)
1998–99	Partizan	SR	(Italy) Lazio	2–3	0–0	2–3

==== Intertoto Cup (only UEFA-administered) ====
===== SFR Yugoslavia era (1960–1988) =====
Season	Club	Round	Opponent	Home	Away	Agg.
1962–63	OFK Beograd	GS	(Italy) Lanerossi Vicenza	2–1	0–2	1st out of 4
1962–63	OFK Beograd	GS	(Netherlands) Feyenoord	1–0	2–1	1st out of 4
1962–63	OFK Beograd	GS	(West Germany) Bayern Munich	4–1	4–4	1st out of 4
1962–63	OFK Beograd	QF	(Italy) Padova	4–3	1–7	5–10
1963–64	OFK Beograd	GS	(Czechoslovakia) Slovan Bratislava	2–2	0–4	3rd out of 4
1963–64	OFK Beograd	GS	(Poland) Ruch Chorzów	2–1	0–3	3rd out of 4
1963–64	OFK Beograd	GS	(East Germany) Empor Rostock	2–1	1–1	3rd out of 4
1963–64	Red Star Belgrade	GS	(Poland) Polonia Bytom	4–3	1–6	3rd out of 4
1963–64	Red Star Belgrade	GS	(Czechoslovakia) Jednota Trenčín	2–1	1–2	3rd out of 4
1963–64	Red Star Belgrade	GS	(East Germany) Vorwärts Berlin	2–1	2–2	3rd out of 4
1964–65	Vojvodina	GS	(East Germany) Lokomotive Leipzig	1–2	0–2	2nd out of 4
1964–65	Vojvodina	GS	(Czechoslovakia) Jednota Trenčín	2–3	4–3	2nd out of 4
1964–65	Vojvodina	GS	(Austria) First Vienna	5–2	1–1	2nd out of 4
1964–65	Radnički Niš	GS	(Sweden) Norrköping	0–2	2–2	4th out of 4
1964–65	Radnički Niš	GS	(Poland) Gwardia Warsaw	5–1	2–4	4th out of 4
1964–65	Radnički Niš	GS	(East Germany) Empor Rostock	3–0	1–3	4th out of 4

===== FR Yugoslavia / Serbia and Montenegro era (1995–2006) =====
Season	Club	Round	Opponent	Home	Away	Agg.
1995	Bečej	GS	(Romania) Farul Constanța	—N/a	1–2	4th out of 5
1995	Bečej	GS	(Belarus) Dnepr Mogilev	1–2	—N/a	4th out of 5
1995	Bečej	GS	(Poland) Pogoń Szczecin	—N/a	2–1	4th out of 5
1995	Bečej	GS	(France) Cannes	0–1	—N/a	4th out of 5
1996	Čukarički	GS	(Slovakia) Spartak Trnava	—N/a	0–1	5th out of 5
1996	Čukarički	GS	(Latvia) Daugava	1–3	—N/a	5th out of 5
1996	Čukarički	GS	(Germany) Karlsruher SC	—N/a	0–3	5th out of 5
1996	Čukarički	GS	(Romania) Universitatea Craiova	1–2	—N/a	5th out of 5
1996	Zemun	GS	(Romania) Dinamo București	2–1	—N/a	2nd out of 5
1996	Zemun	GS	(Georgia (country)) Kolkheti Poti	—N/a	3–2	2nd out of 5
1996	Zemun	GS	(Finland) Jaro	3–2	—N/a	2nd out of 5
1996	Zemun	GS	(France) Guingamp	—N/a	0–1	2nd out of 5
1997	Hajduk Kula	GS	(Sweden) Halmstad	0–1	—N/a	3rd out of 5
1997	Hajduk Kula	GS	(Finland) TPS	—N/a	2–1	3rd out of 5
1997	Hajduk Kula	GS	(Norway) Kongsvinger	2–0	—N/a	3rd out of 5
1997	Hajduk Kula	GS	(Belgium) Lommel	—N/a	2–3	3rd out of 5
1997	Čukarički	GS	(Netherlands) Groningen	—N/a	0–1	3rd out of 5
1997	Čukarički	GS	(Romania) Gloria Bistrița	3–2	—N/a	3rd out of 5
1997	Čukarički	GS	(France) Montpellier	—N/a	1–3	3rd out of 5
1997	Čukarički	GS	(Bulgaria) Spartak Varna	3–0	—N/a	3rd out of 5
1997	Proleter Zrenjanin	GS	(Israel) Maccabi Haifa	4–0	—N/a	3rd out of 5
1997	Proleter Zrenjanin	GS	(Russia) Lokomotiv Nizhny Novgorod	—N/a	0–1	3rd out of 5
1997	Proleter Zrenjanin	GS	(Slovenia) Celje	0–0	—N/a	3rd out of 5
1997	Proleter Zrenjanin	GS	(Turkey) Antalyaspor	—N/a	0–1	3rd out of 5
1998	Vojvodina	FR	(Norway) Stabæk	3–2	2–1	5–3
1998	Vojvodina	SR	(Sweden) Örebro	2–0	2–0	4–0
1998	Vojvodina	TR	(Russia) Baltika Kaliningrad	4–1	0–1	4–2
1998	Vojvodina	SF	(France) Bastia	4–0	0–2	4–2
1998	Vojvodina	Final	(Germany) Werder Bremen	1–1	0–1	1–2
2000	Obilić	FR	(Croatia) Cibalia	1–1	1–3	2–4
2001	Sartid	FR	(Scotland) Dundee	5–2	0–0	5–2
2001	Sartid	SR	(Germany) 1860 Munich	2–3	1–3	3–6
2002	Obilić	FR	(Finland) Haka	1–2	1–1	2–3
2003	OFK Beograd	FR	(Estonia) Narva Trans	6–1	5–3	11–4
2003	OFK Beograd	SR	(Czech Republic) Slovácko	3–3	0–1	3–4
2004	Sartid	FR	(Andorra) Sant Julià	3–0	8–0	11–0
2004	Sartid	SR	(Belarus) Dinamo Minsk	1–3	2–1	3–4
2004	OFK Beograd	SR	(Latvia) Dinaburg	3–1	2–0	5–1
2004	OFK Beograd	TR	(Finland) Tampere United	1–0	0–0	1–0
2004	OFK Beograd	SF	(Spain) Atlético Madrid	1–3	0–2	1–5
2005	Smederevo	FR	(North Macedonia) Pobeda	0–1	1–2	1–3

===== Serbia era (2006–2008) =====
Season	Club	Round	Opponent	Home	Away	Agg.
2007	Hajduk Kula	R2	(Slovenia) Maribor	5–0	0–2	5–2
2007	Hajduk Kula	R3	(Portugal) Leiria	1–0	1–4	2–4
2008	OFK Beograd	R2	(Greece) Panionios	1–0	1–3	2–3
