= Blagoev =

Blagoev or Blagoyev (Bulgarian: Благоев) is a Bulgarian male surname meaning "son of Blagoy", its feminine counterpart is Blagoeva or Blagoyeva. Notable people with the surname include:

- Blagoy Blagoev (born 1956), Bulgarian weightlifter
- Boris Blagoev (born 1985), Bulgarian football player
- Dimitar Blagoev (1856–1924), Bulgarian politician
- Maya Blagoeva (born 1956), Bulgarian Olympic gymnast
- Silvana Blagoeva (born 1972), Bulgarian Olympic biathlon competitor
- Yordanka Blagoeva (born 1947), Bulgarian high jumper

== See also ==
- Blagojević, Montenegrin and Serbian equivalent
