= Milan Blagojevic =

Milan Blagojević may refer to:

- Milan Blagojevic (soccer) (born 1969), Australian football player
- Milan Blagojević (basketball) (born 1929), Serbian basketball player
- Milan Blagojević Španac (1905–1941), Yugoslav military officer
  - Milan Blagojević - Namenska, Serbian chemical defense company
- Milan Blagojević (jurist) (born 1965), Serbian jurist
