= Blagoj =

Blagoj (Macedonian: Благој) is a Macedonian masculine given name. It may refer to:

- Blagoj Jankov Mučeto, Macedonian partisan who was declared a People's Hero of Yugoslavia
- Blagoj Nacoski (born 1979), Macedonian tenor opera singer
- Blagoj Stračkovski (1920–1943), Macedonian communist

== See also ==
- Blagoy, a Bulgarian name
- Blagoje, a Serbian name
