= Nedeljko Milosavljević =

Serbian footballer

Personal information
- Full name: Nedeljko Milosavljević
- Date of birth: 12 December 1960 (age 65)
- Place of birth: Aranđelovac, FPR Yugoslavia
- Height: 6 ft 1 in (1.85 m)
- Position: Forward

Senior career*
Years	Team	Apps	(Gls)
1977–1985	Red Star Belgrade	107	(14)
1985–1987	Proleter Zrenjanin	27	(3)
1988–1989	Kremser SC	22	(8)

International career
1979	Yugoslavia U20	2	(2)
- * Club domestic league appearances and goals

Nedeljko Milosavljević (Serbian Cyrillic: Недељко Милосављевић; born 12 December 1960) is a Serbian retired footballer.

== Playing career ==
=== Club career ===
He was part of the Red Star Belgrade squad that played in the 1979 UEFA Cup Final.

=== International career ===
He was also part of the Yugoslavia U20 squad that took part in the 1979 FIFA World Youth Championship.
