= Milan Blagojević (jurist) =

Serbian jurist

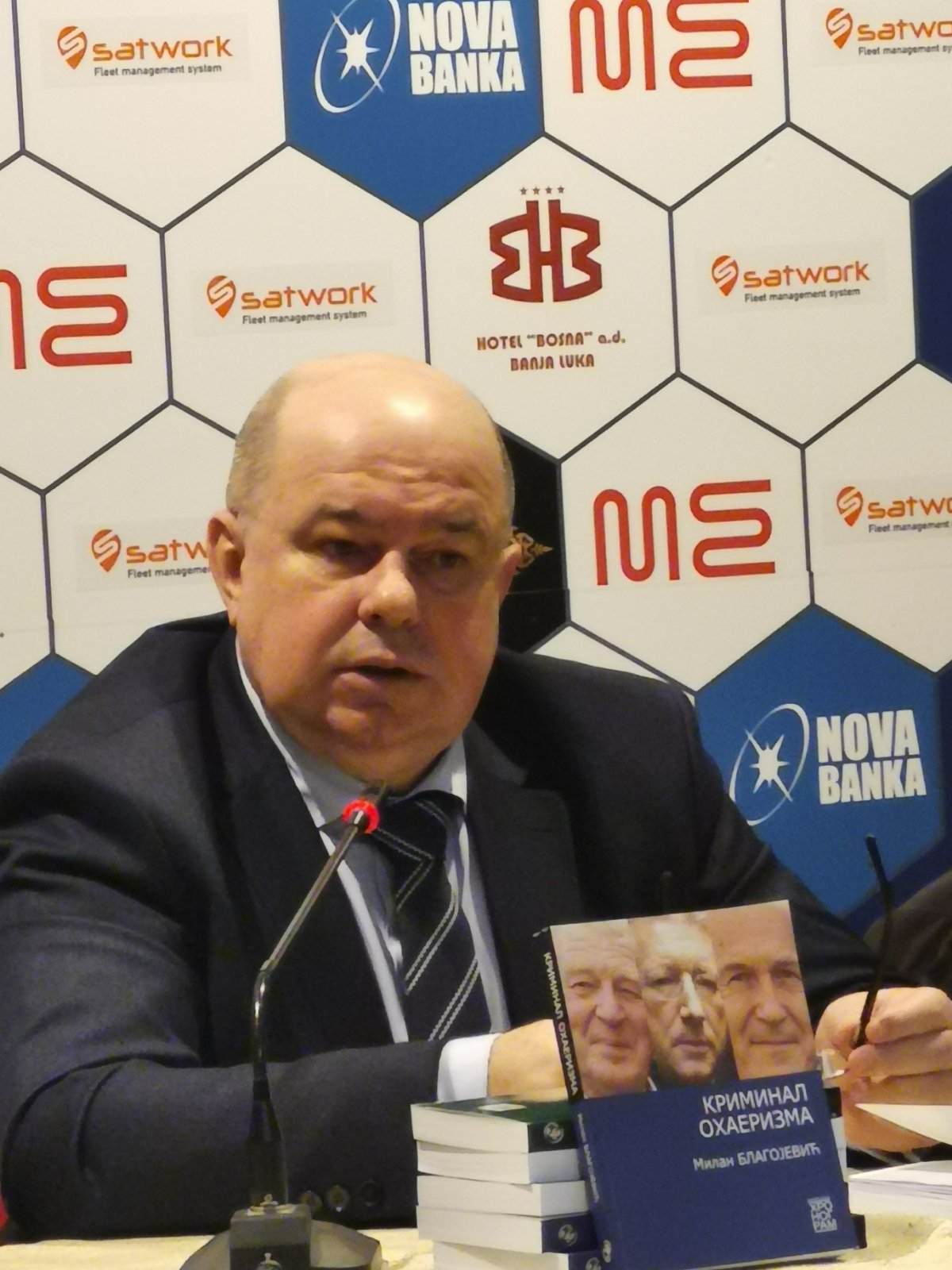

Milan Blagojević (born 12 May 1965) is a Serbian jurist, a full-time professor of Constitutional Law and a former judge of the District Court of Banja Luka. In 2023, he served as a legal advisor to the Serb member of the Presidency of Bosnia and Herzegovina.
