= Zdravko Čakalić =

Croatian footballer

Personal information
- Date of birth: 16 August 1960 (age 66)
- Place of birth: Osijek, FPR Yugoslavia
- Height: 1.85 m (6 ft 1 in)
- Position: Midfielder

Senior career*
Years	Team	Apps	(Gls)
1978–1983	Red Star Belgrade		
1982	→ Teteks (loan)		
1983–1984	Galenika Zemun		
1984–1986	Osijek		
1986–1991	Offenburger FV		

International career
1979	Yugoslavia U20		
- * Club domestic league appearances and goals

Zdravko Čakalić (born 16 August 1960) is a former professional footballer who played as a midfielder for Red Star Belgrade, FK Teteks, FK Zemun, NK Osijek, and Offenburger FV. He was part of the Yugoslav U20 team at the 1979 FIFA World Youth Championship.
