= Jovan Blagojevic =

Jovan Blagojevic may refer to:

- Jovan Blagojević (footballer, born 1988), Serbian footballer currently on the Turkish team Altay S.K.
- Jovan Blagojevic (soccer, born 1991), Serbian-born Canadian soccer player
