= Blagoy =

Blagoy (Bulgarian: Благой) is a Bulgarian masculine given name and may refer to:

- Blagoy Blagoev (born 1956), Olympic weightlifter for Bulgaria
- Blagoy Georgiev (born 1981), Bulgarian footballer
- Blagoy Makendzhiev (born 1988), Bulgarian footballer
- Blagoy Nakov (born 1985), Bulgarian footballer
- Blagoy Popov (1902–1968), co-defendant along with Georgi Dimitrov and Vasil Tanev in the Leipzig trial
- Blagoy Shklifov, Bulgarian dialectologist and phonologist
- Blagoy Ivanov, Bulgarian mixed martial artist

== See also ==
- Blagoje
- Blagoj
