= Vladimir Petrović =

Serbian footballer and manager (born 1955)

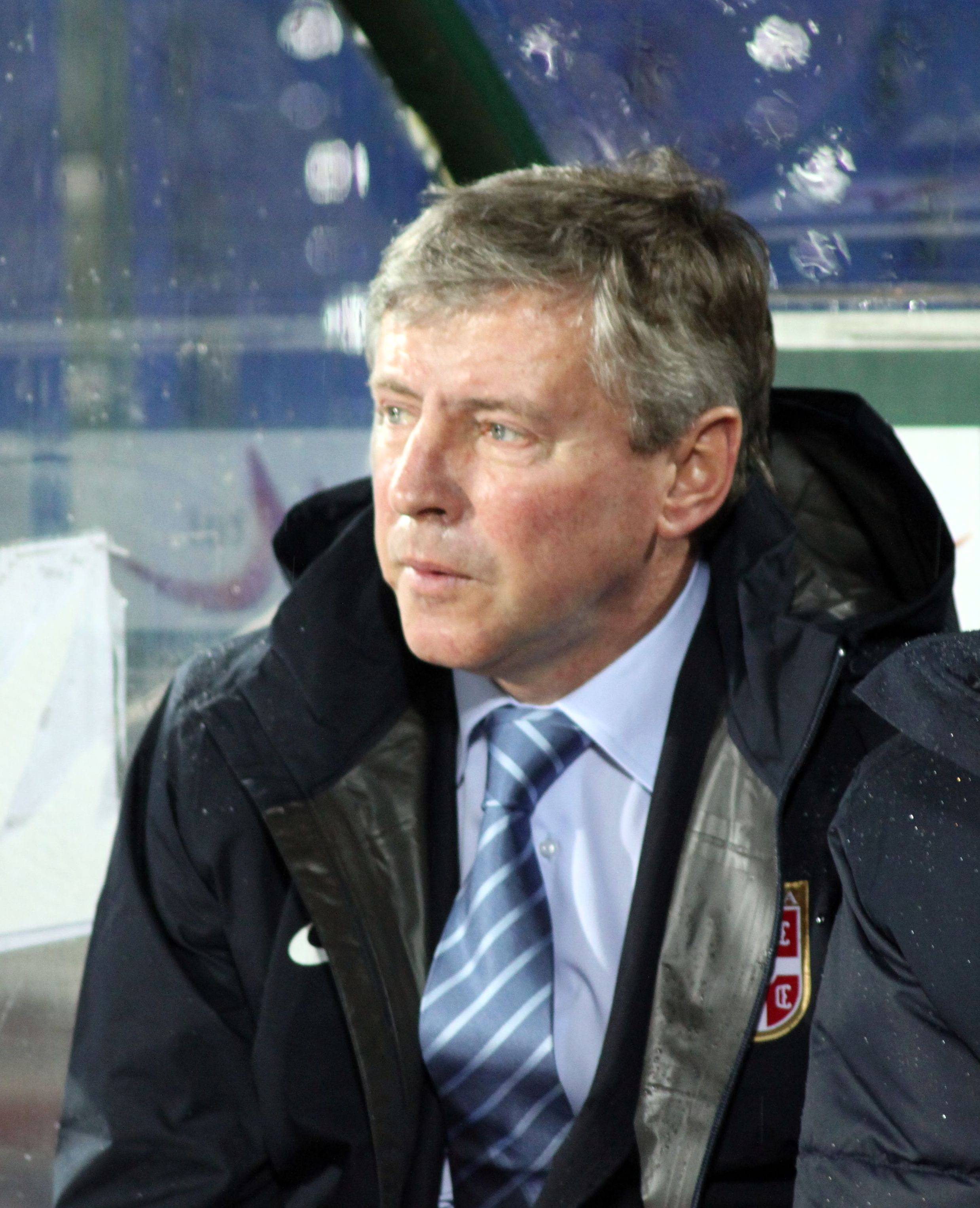
- Petrović as Serbia manager in 2010

Personal information
- Full name: Vladimir Petrović
- Date of birth: 1 July 1955 (age 71)
- Place of birth: Belgrade, PR Serbia, FPR Yugoslavia
- Height: 1.82 m (5 ft 11 1/2 in)
- Position: Midfielder

Senior career*
Years	Team	Apps	(Gls)
1972–1982	Red Star Belgrade	257	(49)
1982–1983	Arsenal	13	(2)
1983–1985	Royal Antwerp	48	(10)
1985–1986	Brest	37	(5)
1986–1987	Standard Liège	31	(5)
1987–1988	Nancy	29	(1)
Total		415	(72)

International career
1973–1982	Yugoslavia	34	(5)

Managerial career
- 1992: Radnički Beograd
- 1993: Borac Banja Luka
- 1996–1997: Red Star Belgrade
- 1999–2000: Atromitos
- 2000–2001: Slavia Mozyr
- 2002–2004: Serbia and Montenegro U21
- 2004: Vojvodina
- 2005–2006: Dalian Shide
- 2007–2008: China
- 2009–2010: Red Star Belgrade
- 2010: Timișoara
- 2010–2011: Serbia
- 2013: Iraq
- 2013–2014: Yemen
- 2015: OFK Beograd
Medal record
Men's football
Representing Serbia and Montenegro (as manager)
UEFA European Under-21 Championship
Runner-up	2004
- * Club domestic league appearances and goals

Vladimir Petrović (Serbian Cyrillic: Владимир Петровић, pronounced [ʋlǎdimiːr pětroʋitɕ]; born 1 July 1955) is a Serbian former football manager and player.

He is widely known domestically by his nickname Pižon (Serbian: Пижон), after the French for pigeon.

== Club career ==
During his playing career, he mostly played for Red Star Belgrade and is one of the five Zvezdine zvezde (The Stars of Red Star) — the legends of the club.

He started out at Red Star making his debut in 1971, at the age of 16. With the team, he won four Yugoslav First League titles, one Yugoslav Cup and reached the 1979 UEFA Cup final, losing to Borussia Mönchengladbach. In 1980, he was named the Yugoslav Footballer of the Year.

In 1982, he moved abroad, and briefly played for Arsenal; he joined the London side in December 1982 and made 22 appearances in the 1982–83 season. At Arsenal he had a brief but memorable career and helped them reach the semi-finals of both domestic cups (losing both to Manchester United). He scored twice in the league against Stoke City and West Ham United and once in the FA Cup quarter final against Aston Villa. In June 1983 he left Arsenal and subsequently played for Brest and AS Nancy in France, and Royal Antwerp (1) and Standard Liège (16) in Belgium. In all he played 526 matches for the clubs.

== International career ==
Petrović represented Yugoslavia 34 times and played in the 1974 World Cup and 1982 World Cups. His final international was an October 1982 European Championship qualification match away against Norway.

== Managerial career ==
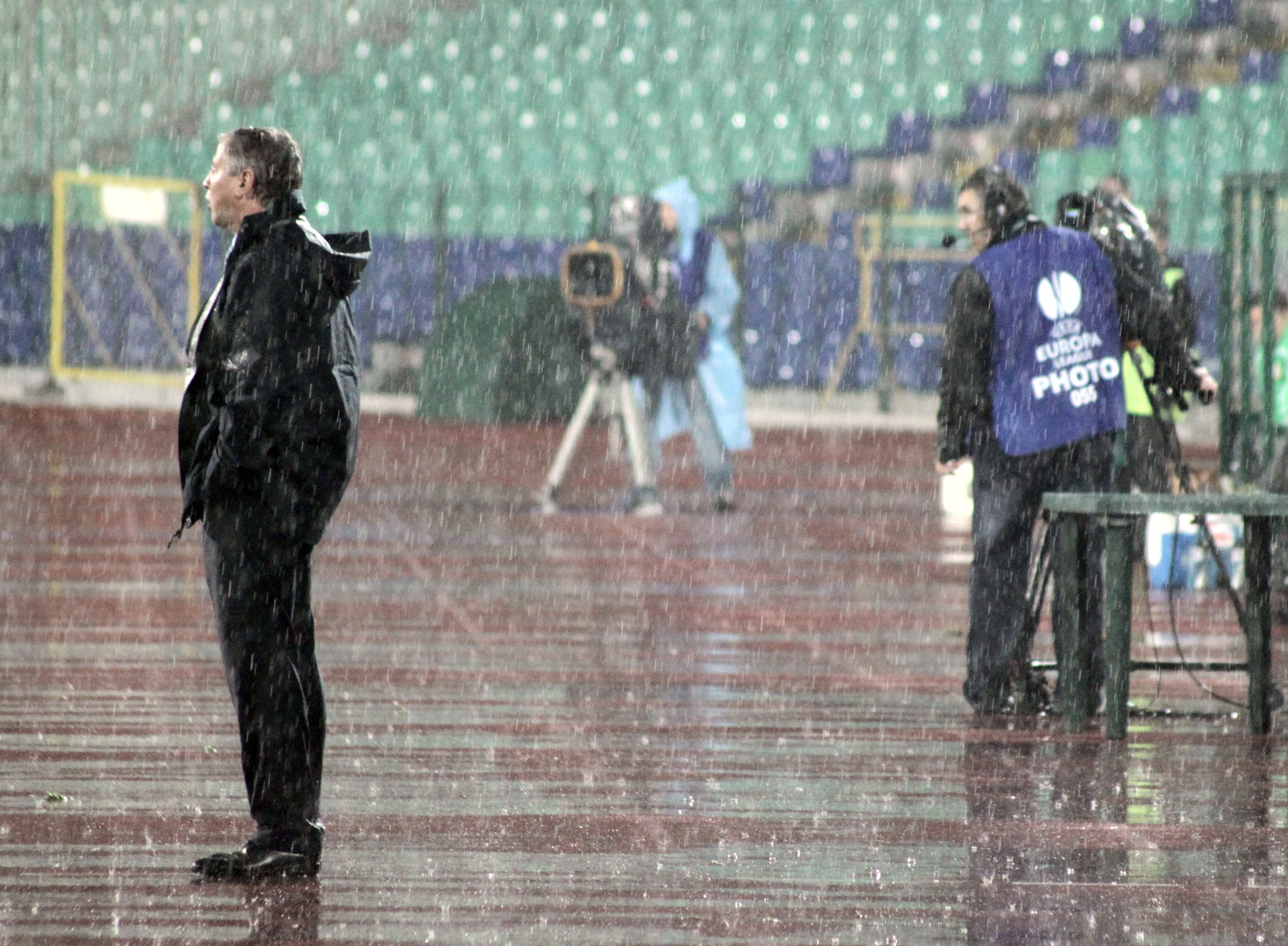
Petrović as Serbia manager during a friendly match against Bulgaria in Sofia on 17 November 2010

As assistant coach, Petrović won the 1990–91 European Cup with Red Star, and as head coach when they won the 1996–97 FR Yugoslavia Cup. He guided the Serbia and Montenegro national under-21 football team to a runners-up finish at the 2004 UEFA European Under-21 Championship.

In 2005, Petrović managed the Chinese Dalian Shide team to the double. On 14 September 2007, Petrović was named as coach of the Chinese national team. After China failed to qualify for the 2010 World Cup, he was sacked.

On 2 June 2009, Petrović returned to Red Star Belgrade. As manager, Petrović was part of takeover of Red Star by the club's veterans, replacing caretaker/interim coach Siniša Gogić. On 21 March 2010, Red Star officials unexpectedly sacked Petrović after a league defeat against Metalac.

On 4 June 2010, he was named the manager of Romanian club Politehnica Timișoara.

On 15 September 2010, Petrović was named the new head coach of Serbia. On 14 October 2011, the Football Association of Serbia announced they had terminated their contract with Petrović.

In 2013, he was the head coach of the Iraq national team. On 13 December 2013, he was named the head of coach of the Yemen national team. In May 2014, he resigned following the expiration of the contract. In 2015, Petrović managed OFK Beograd.

== Career statistics ==
Appearances and goals by club, season and competition
Club	Season	League		Cup		Continental		Total	
Club	Season	Apps	Goals	Apps	Goals	Apps	Goals	Apps	Goals
Red Star Belgrade	1972–73	27	2			2	0	29	2
Red Star Belgrade	1973–74	31	7			6	1	37	8
Red Star Belgrade	1974–75	26	5			6	1	32	6
Red Star Belgrade	1975–76	12	1			4	0	16	1
Red Star Belgrade	1976–77	10	0					10	0
Red Star Belgrade	1977–78	28	9			4	0	32	9
Red Star Belgrade	1978–79	27	5			10	1	37	6
Red Star Belgrade	1979–80	28	5			4	1	32	6
Red Star Belgrade	1980–81	23	6			5	2	28	8
Red Star Belgrade	1981–82	29	3			5	3	34	6
Red Star Belgrade	1982–83	16	6					16	6
Red Star Belgrade	Total	257	49			46	9	303	58

== Managerial statistics ==
As of 22 August 2015

Team	From	To	Record							
Team	From	To	Played	W	D	L	GF	GA	±	Win %
Red Star Belgrade	July 1996	August 1997	46	31	7	8	91	37	+54	67.39
Atromitos	September 1999	January 2000	0	0	0	0	0	0	+0	—
Slavia Mozyr	July 2000	August 2001	41	24	7	10	88	34	+54	58.54
Serbia and Montenegro U21	July 2002	June 2004	16	8	2	6	25	31	−6	50.00
Vojvodina	December 2004	December 2004	0	0	0	0	0	0	+0	—
Dalian Shide	July 2005	December 2006	26	21	2	3	57	18	+39	80.77
China	September 2007	July 2008	18	6	7	5	28	16	+12	33.33
Red Star Belgrade	June 2009	March 2010	25	20	1	4	47	18	+29	80.00
Politehnica Timișoara	June 2010	September 2010	11	3	6	2	33	8	+25	27.27
Serbia	September 2010	October 2011	13	5	3	5	13	14	−1	38.46
Iraq	February 2013	September 2013	7	1	0	6	2	12	−10	14.29
Yemen	December 2013	May 2014	3	1	1	1	3	2	+1	33.33
OFK Beograd	July 2015	August 2015	7	2	0	5	11	9	+2	28.57
Total			230	127	41	62	400	230	+170	55.22

== Honours ==
=== Player ===
Red Star Belgrade

- Yugoslav First League: 1972–73, 1976–77, 1979–80, 1980–81
- Yugoslav Cup: 1981–82
- UEFA Cup runner-up: 1978–79

=== Manager ===
Red Star Belgrade

- FR Yugoslavia Cup: 1996–97

Dalian Shide

- Chinese Super League: 2005
- Chinese FA Cup: 2005

Serbia and Montenegro U21

- UEFA European Under-21 Championship runner-up: 2004
