= Dušan Savić =

Serbian footballer

Personal information
- Full name: Dušan Savić
- Date of birth: 1 June 1955 (age 71)
- Place of birth: Ub, PR Serbia, FPR Yugoslavia
- Height: 1.80 m (5 ft 11 in)
- Position: Forward

Senior career*
Years	Team	Apps	(Gls)
1973–1982	Red Star Belgrade	202	(120)
1982–1983	Sporting Gijón	13	(3)
1983–1985	Lille	70	(25)
1985–1989	Cannes	103	(38)
Total		388	(186)

International career
1975–1982	Yugoslavia	12	(4)
- * Club domestic league appearances and goals

Dušan "Dule" Savić (Serbian Cyrillic: Душан "Дуле" Савић; born 1 June 1955) is a retired Serbian footballer.

== Playing career ==
=== Club ===
Savić started playing football in the local side Jedinstvo Ub in his hometown. He arrived for a tryout at Red Star's Marakana Stadium on 21 March 1972, and was promptly included in the club's youth system. Two years later in 1974, he became a first team player. He quickly grew into a feared striker and a fan favourite. He ended up playing more than 400 official matches for Red Star Belgrade.

After leaving Red Star halfway through the 1982–83 season, Savić had a six-month stint in La Liga with Sporting de Gijón where he was brought by countryman Vujadin Boškov who was the head coach at the Asturian club. Savić then spent six seasons in French Ligue 1: two with Lille OSC, and four with AS Cannes.

=== International ===
At still only 19, he made his national team debut for Yugoslavia in a May 1975 friendly match against the Netherlands. He would earn a total of 12 caps (4 goals) and won his final one in an October 1982 defeat away against Norway.

== Post-playing ==
Savić performed the role of Red Star's sporting director from 1998 until 2005 under club president Dragan Džajić.

== Personal life ==
Savić is married to TV journalist Marina Rajević who hosted a popular one-on-one talk-show Dok anđeli spavaju on RTS' third channel and later on BKTV.

They have two sons: Uroš and Vujadin and a daughter named Teodora. Vujadin was also a professional football player.

== In pop culture ==
In addition to being a Red Star former great, fondly remembered by football fans across Serbia, Savić unexpectedly grew into somewhat of a pop-culture hero during the late 1990s. Several things contributed to this.

The 1998 movie The Wounds directed by Srđan Dragojević, features a scene with two main characters chanting "Duuuule Savić" during sexual intercourse with a prostitute. The chant is delivered in fashion similar to the way neighbourhood kids exclaim their favourite player's name after scoring a goal on the playground. Also, name Dule Savić is yelled out by disabled soldier in Dragojević's 1996 movie Pretty Village, Pretty Flame when he tries to kick papaya thrown to him by couple of junkies.

Then in 1996, rock band Prljavi Inspektor Blaža i Kljunovi released a track titled "Dule Savić" that is playing on the new meaning of "Dule Savić" with sexual connotations introduced by The Wounds movie.

Finally, in the 2000 comedy Munje! by Radivoj Andrić, Savić plays himself as deus ex machina of sorts in a scene featuring the main characters being stranded with a broken down vehicle in the middle of the night. Just as they are discussing Savić's famous 1979 UEFA Cup 3rd round goal vs. Arsenal F.C. at Highbury, he suddenly appears out of nowhere in his oldtimer, dispenses some random life advice, and rides off into the night.

== Career statistics ==
Club	Season	League		Cup		Europe		Total	
Club	Season	Apps	Goals	Apps	Goals	Apps	Goals	Apps	Goals
Red Star Belgrade	1973–74	9	6	?	?	?	?	9	6
Red Star Belgrade	1974–75	30	20	?	?	?	?	30	20
Red Star Belgrade	1975–76	19	9	?	?	?	?	19	9
Red Star Belgrade	1976–77	25	15	?	?	?	?	25	15
Red Star Belgrade	1977–78	16	6	?	?	?	?	16	6
Red Star Belgrade	1978–79	30	24	?	?	?	?	30	24
Red Star Belgrade	1979–80	28	11	?	?	?	?	28	11
Red Star Belgrade	1980–81	Mandatory army service							
Red Star Belgrade	1981–82	30	16	?	?	?	?	30	16
Red Star Belgrade	1982–83	15	13	?	?	?	?	15	13
Red Star Belgrade	Total	202	120	?	?	?	?	202	120
