= Cvijetin Blagojević =

Yugoslav footballer

Personal information
- Full name: Cvijetin Blagojević
- Date of birth: 10 April 1955 (age 71)
- Place of birth: Lopare, FPR Yugoslavia
- Position: Midfielder

Senior career*
| Years | Team | Apps | (Gls) |
| 1976–1978 | Sloboda Tuzla | 34 | (2) |
| 1978–1983 | Red Star Belgrade | 107 | (8) |
| 1983–1984 | Egaleo | 7 | (1) |
| 1984–1985 | Vasalunds IF | | |
| 1985–1986 | Marítimo | 23 | (2) |
| 1986–1987 | Sloboda Tuzla | 4 | (1) |
| Total | | 175 | (14) |

Managerial career
- Železnik
- Kozara Gradiška
- 2002–2003: Radnički Obrenovac
- Red Star Belgrade (youth)
- 2007: Radnički Pirot
- 2013: Radnik Surdulica
- 2016: Drina Zvornik
- 2021: GSP Polet Dorćol
- * Club domestic league appearances and goals

Cvijetin Blagojević (Serbian Cyrillic: Цвијетин Благојевић; born April 10, 1955) is a Bosnian Serb football manager and former player.

== Playing career ==
Cvijetin was born in Lopare. During his playing career, he played in the Yugoslav First League clubs FK Sloboda Tuzla and Red Star Belgrade before deciding to continue his career abroad, playing first in Greece with Egaleo F.C., and then with Swedish club Vasalunds IF, and Portuguese CS Marítimo.

== Managerial career ==
After retiring, he became a football manager. He initially coached Šumarice and Plavi tim in Sweden, and then returned to the region of former-Yugoslavia where he coached Železnik, Kozara Gradiška, Radnički Obrenovac, Red Star Belgrade youth team, Radnički Pirot, Radnik Surdulica and Drina Zvornik.
