= Telephone numbers in Serbia =

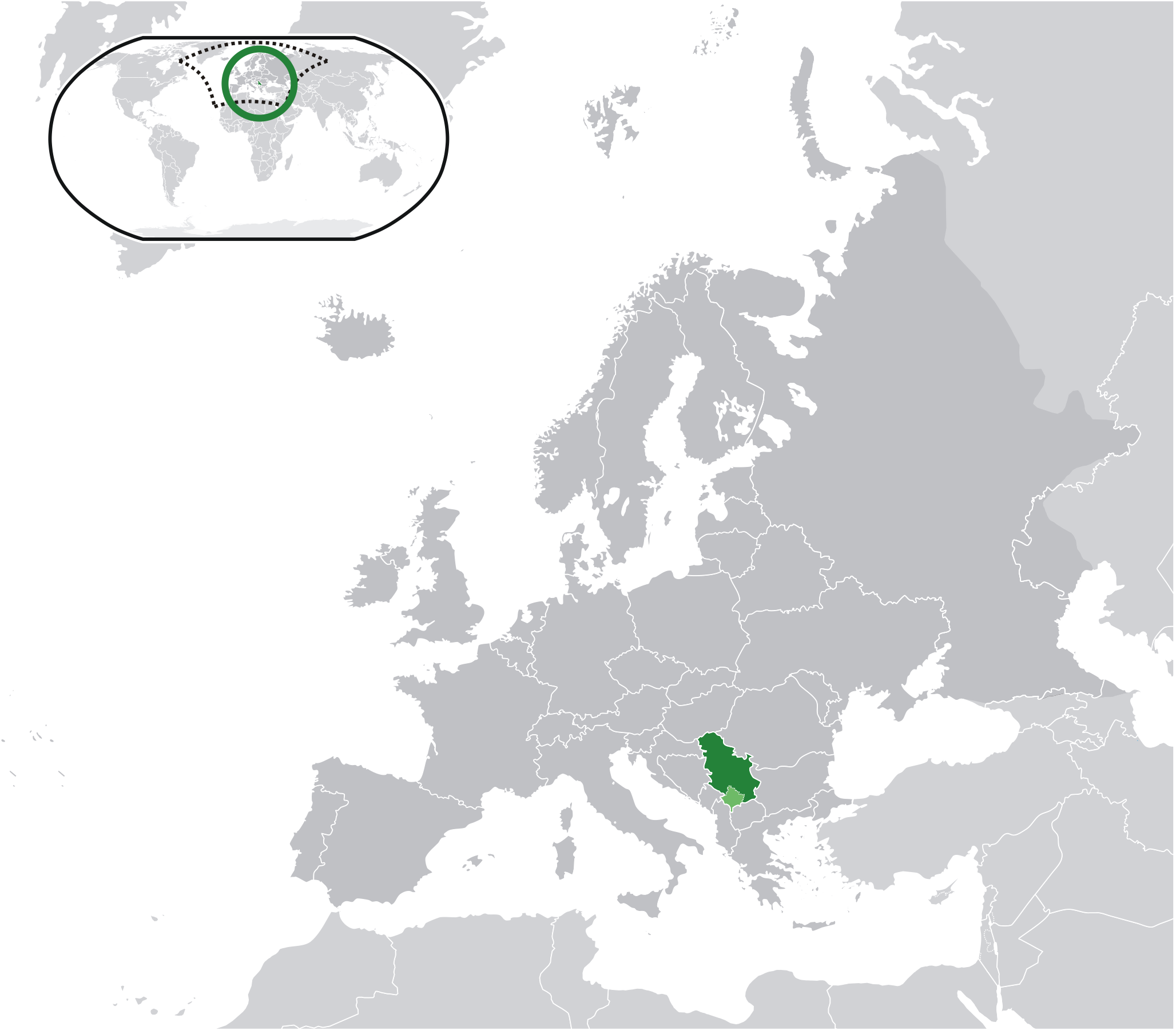
- Location of Serbia
- Country: Serbia
- Continent: Europe
- Regulator: RATEL
- Numbering plan type: Open
- Format: 0xx xxx xx xx
- Country code: 381
- International access: 00
- Long-distance: 0

Telephone numbers in Serbia are administered by Regulatory Authority for Electronic Communications and Postal Services (RATEL), an independent regulatory authority. The telephone country code of Serbia is 381. The country has an open telephone numbering plan, with most numbers consisting of a two- or three-digit area codes and six to seven digits for the subscriber number.

== Overview ==
The telephone country code of Serbia is 381. Serbia and Montenegro received this country code following the breakup of the Socialist Federal Republic of Yugoslavia in 1992, which used country code 38. Montenegro switched to 382 after its independence in 2006.

An example for calling telephones in Belgrade, Serbia is as follows:

- xxx xx xx (telephone number in Serbia)
- 011 xxx xx xx (house number in Belgrade)
- +381 xx xxx xx xx (outside Serbia)

For domestic calls (within the country), 0 must be dialled before the area code.

For calls from Serbia, the prefix for international calls was 99, but was changed to 00 on 1 April 2008, in accordance to the recommendations of the International Telecommunication Union (ITU), and matching the majority of European countries. (e.g. for a United States number 00 1 ... should be dialled).

== Landline telephony ==
Area codes in Serbia have been largely unchanged since the time of Socialist Federal Republic of Yugoslavia. As Socialist Republic of Serbia had been assigned codes starting with 1, 2 and 3, they were simply carried over by Serbia after the breakup.

Area codes:

Network Group	Code	Municipalities covered by code
Belgrade	11	Belgrade, Barajevo, Grocka, Lazarevac, Mladenovac, Obrenovac, Sopot, Surčin
Bor	30	Bor, Boljevac, Majdanpek
Čačak	32	Čačak, Gornji Milanovac, Ivanjica, Lučani
Jagodina	35	Jagodina, Ćuprija, Despotovac, Paraćin, Rekovac, Svilajnac
Kikinda	230	Kikinda, Čoka, Novi Kneževac
Kragujevac	34	Kragujevac, Aranđelovac, Batočina, Knić, Lapovo, Rača, Topola
Kraljevo	36	Kraljevo, Raška, Vrnjačka Banja
Kruševac	37	Kruševac, Aleksandrovac, Brus, Ćićevac, Ražanj, Trstenik, Varvarin
Leskovac	16	Leskovac, Bojnik, Crna Trava, Lebane, Medveđa, Vlasotince
Niš	18	Niš, Aleksinac, Bela Palanka, Doljevac, Gadžin Han, Merošina, Sokobanja, Svrljig
Novi Pazar	20	Novi Pazar, Sjenica, Tutin
Novi Sad	21	City of Novi Sad, Bač, Bačka Palanka, Bački Petrovac, Bečej, Beočin, Temerin, Titel, Srbobran, Sremski Karlovci, Vrbas, Žabalj
Pančevo	13	Pančevo, Alibunar, Bela Crkva, Kovačica, Kovin, Opovo, Plandište, Vršac
Pirot	10	Pirot, Babušnica, Dimitrovgrad
Požarevac	12	Požarevac, Golubac, Kučevo, Petrovac, Veliko Gradište, Žabari, Žagubica, Malo Crniće
Prijepolje	33	Prijepolje, Nova Varoš, Priboj
Prokuplje	27	Prokuplje, Blace, Kuršumlija, Žitorađa
Smederevo	26	Smederevo, Smederevska Palanka, Velika Plana
Sombor	25	Sombor, Apatin, Kula, Odžaci
Sremska Mitrovica	22	Sremska Mitrovica, Inđija, Irig, Pećinci, Ruma, Stara Pazova, Šid
Subotica	24	Subotica, Ada, Bačka Topola, Kanjiža, Mali Iđoš, Senta
Šabac	15	Šabac, Bogatić, Koceljeva, Krupanj, Ljubovija, Loznica, Mali Zvornik, Vladimirci
Užice	31	Užice, Arilje, Bajina Bašta, Čajetina, Kosjerić, Požega
Valjevo	14	Valjevo, Lajkovac, Ljig, Mionica, Osečina, Ub
Vranje	17	Vranje, Bosilegrad, Bujanovac, Preševo, Surdulica, Trgovište, Vladičin Han
Zaječar	19	Zaječar, Kladovo, Knjaževac, Negotin
Zrenjanin	23	Zrenjanin, Novi Bečej, Sečanj, Nova Crnja, Žitište

Until 2013, Telekom Srbija had a monopoly on fixed telephony services. When the new regulation came in force, competition became allowed in this field as well, and other operators entered the market, using alternative communication infrastructure:

- Orion Telekom – over CDMA
- SBB – over coaxial cable (cable TV infrastructure)
- Yettel Serbia – offering services only to business customers

== Mobile telephony ==
There are three active mobile operators in Serbia (without Kosovo):

- Mobile Telephony of Serbia, styled as mts – subsidiary of Telekom Srbija
- Yettel Serbia
- A1 Serbia

and three virtual mobile operators:

- SBB
- Globaltel
- Vectone Mobile

The calling codes are assigned to the operators using the following scheme:

Code	Usage
60, 61, 68	A1
62, 63, 69	Yettel Serbia
64, 65, 66	mts
677	Globaltel (MVNO)
678	Vectone Mobile (MVNO)

Calling codes in the table are assigned to new customers by the respective provider. However, since 2011 customers can change the operator and retain the old calling code (along with the rest of the phone number). Thus, calling codes do not necessarily reflect the operator. It is not possible, however, to transfer a mobile number to a land-based operator and vice versa.

== Special codes ==
The following special telephone numbers are valid across the country:

Code	Service
11 811	Subscribers numbers
19 011	International calls
19 191	BIA (Security Intelligence Agency)
192	Police
193	Fire service
194	Ambulance
195	Exact time
1961	Telegram service
1976	Military ambulance
19 771	Landline phone technical support
19 811	Wake-up service
19 812	Various information
19 813	Landline phone information center
19 822	Meteorological data, lottery, liturgical calendar
1985	Civil protection (major accidents)
19 860	Military police
1987	Road assistance (AMSS)

In 2012, 2-digit emergency numbers were replaced by 3-digit ones (i.e. 192, 193 and 194 instead of 92, 93 and 94). This also applied to 976 (becoming 1976), 985 (becoming 1985), 987 (becoming 1987) and 9860 (becoming 19 860). 112 redirects to 192 on mobile phones.

== Kosovo ==
The telephone country code for Kosovo is 383. This code is the property which it received by ITU through for the needs of the geographical region Kosovo as a result of the 2013 Brussels Agreement signed by the governments of Kosovo. Kosovo declared independence from in 2008, but retained country code 381 only for fixed-line telephony until 2016. Country code 383 was allocated on 15 December 2016.

=== Fixed-line telephony ===
Network Group	Code	Municipalities covered by code
Uroševac	290	Uroševac, Kačanik, Štrpce
Ðakovica	390	Ðakovica, Dečani
Gnjilane	280	Gnjilane, Kosovska Kamenica, Vitina
Kosovska Mitrovica	28	Kosovska Mitrovica, Leposavić, Srbica, Vučitrn
Peć	39	Peć, Istok, Klina
Priština	38	Priština, Gračanica, Kosovo Polje, Lipljan
Prizren	29	Prizren, Dragaš, Orahovac, Suva Reka

=== Mobile telephony ===
Code	Usage	Notes
44, 45	Vala	383; Country code 377 (Monaco) was used until 3 February 2017.
43, 49	IPKO	383; Country code 386 (Slovenia) was used until 3 February 2017.
47	mts	Telekom Srbija operates a network in northern Kosovo

== See also ==
- Telecommunications in Serbia
- Country codes of Serbia
