= Internet in Serbia =

The Internet in Serbia is well-developed. The Internet country code top-level domain (ccTLD) for Serbia is .rs and .срб. (Cyrillic)

== History ==
=== Introduction of the Internet ===
Linking of Yugoslavia into global electronic networks began at the end of the 1980s. The European Academic Research Network (EARN) was functioning in Europe at that time. In 1988 the Faculty of Natural Sciences and Mathematics in Belgrade, proposed that Yugoslav universities join the EARN. The University of Belgrade became a node of the EARN in 1989, when the first international connection of the academic network between Belgrade and Linz became active. The capacity of this link initially was 4800 bit/s and it was later doubled to 9600 bit/s.

The project of developing the academic network functioned within the project of developing the system of scientific-technological information (SNTIJ) and was managed by the University of Maribor and the institute Jožef Štefan from Ljubljana. These institutions took on the responsibility of organizing the first .yu domain register between 1990 and 1991.

=== 1990s ===
The development of the Internet in Serbia faced with very difficult circumstances, during the breakup of Yugoslavia. In the middle of 1992 the UN Security Council imposed all-inclusive sanctions against the newly formed Yugoslav federation of Serbia and Montenegro. The sanctions did not exclude telecommunications, and all such government-funded projects came under the sanctions. It was not long before the only Yugoslav Internet link, connecting the Yugoslav academic network to EARN, was shut down. The sanctions prevented foreign companies from doing any kind of business with Yugoslav firms, so it was impossible to establish any commercial Internet links with Yugoslavia. Before November 1995 the only way to access the Internet from Yugoslavia was by using an extremely expensive and slow X.25 packet network or by directly dialing ISPs abroad. These methods were used only by a few of the largest Yugoslav companies and by the academic network.

After the Dayton peace agreement was signed in the middle of November 1995 ending the war in Bosnia, some of the UN sanctions against Yugoslavia were lifted, opening the possibility of decent Internet access.

On 14 December 1995, Belgrade's Radio B92 formed an Internet division, which became known as Opennet. A 128 kbit/s leased phone line link between Radio B92 and the XS4All ISP in Amsterdam was sponsored by the Fund for an Open Society. Opennet became the first Yugoslav ISP to offer affordable public Internet access, e-mail accounts, and Webspace.

Like Radio B92, Opennet strongly supported the Internet as a means of free expression and promoting tolerance and open communication. The Electronic Frontier Foundation honored Opennet's director Drazen Pantic as the EFF Pioneer for 1999, in recognition of his continued promotion of these values and of his contribution to the development of civil society in Yugoslavia. Opennet was also the first Yugoslav ISP to offer public Internet access in three computer centers, known as "Opennet classrooms", in Belgrade.

Shortly after Opennet started up, on 26 February 1996 the first commercial Yugoslav ISP, Beotel, established a 512 kbit/s satellite link with the Norwegian ISP Taide.net. In April 1996 another commercial provider started up with a local branch of EUnet International (now KPNQwest). It started with a 2 Mbit/s digital ground link with Amsterdam and remains the largest and strongest ISP in Serbia. At the beginning of April 2001 EUnet owned two satellite and ground Internet links with an overall capacity of 10 Mbit/s.

During the 1999 NATO bombing of Yugoslavia, the Internet was a significant source of uncensored information for the population of Serbia, as well as a chance for Serbians to show their own view of the bombing to the world. Serbian analyses of the latter usually conclude that use of Internet for this was successful. However, it still didn't attain a widespread adoption due to various socioeconomic difficulties such as conflicts, general poverty, overall computer illiteracy (as a result of mentioned factors among others) and detrimental effects of sanctions and isolation, but still didn't lag dramatically in comparison to the countries in the region of somewhat higher level of economic development and similar socialist past, such as Romania.

=== 2000s ===
Dial-up was the only way to access the Internet until the early 2000s, when several ISPs started to offer wireless access via unlicensed hardware. The equipment required for access was too expensive for most people (about 200 euros), so this type of connection was popular only in limited urban areas.

The situation changed in 2002 when Serbia Broadband (SBB), then a growing cable operator, approached subscribers with a cable Internet option of a tariff based 128 kbit/s access. As of 2019 SBB offers speeds up to 300 Mbit/s.

In 2005 Telekom Srbija started offering ADSL2+ service and in 2013 added VDSL2 service.

=== Contemporary period ===
According to a survey conducted in 2015, there were 4.99 million Internet users, 71% of the population. In 2012 Serbia ranked 44th in the world with 1.1 million Internet hosts.

== Internet access ==
Internet access is available to businesses and home users in various forms, including DSL, cable, wireless, and fiber to the home or business. As of 2023 around 2.08 million households or 80% of all households have Internet connection.

Types of Internet access as of 2023:

- Cable: 38.75%
- FTTx: 30.9%
- xDSL: 25.5%
- Wireless: 4.25%
- Other (Ethernet, LAN): 0.6%

== Internet service providers ==
There are 212 Internet service providers (ISPs): 91 provide wireless access, 37 cable access, 24 fiber to the home/business access, 15 digital subscriber line (xDSL) access, 13 Ethernet/LAN access, and 3 mobile access.

The major Internet service providers are:

- Telekom Srbija (FTTx, xDSL, mobile): 46% market share
- SBB (cable): 21%
- Yettel (mobile): 7%
- Ikom (cable): 3%
- A1: 3%
- PoštaNet (xDSL, cable): 3%
- Orion Telekom (FTTx): 3%
- Kopernikus (cable): 3%
- EUnet (xDSL): 2%
- Radijus Vektor (cable): 2%
- Other: 10%

== Internet censorship and surveillance ==
There are no government restrictions on access to the Internet, e-mail, or Internet chat rooms. There are isolated reports that the government monitors e-mail. Individuals and groups are able to engage in the peaceful expression of views via the Internet, including by e-mail.

The constitution and law provides for freedom of speech and press. However, the constitution specifically allows restrictions on speech "to protect the rights and reputation of others, to uphold the authority and objectivity of the courts and to protect public health, morals of a democratic society and national security of the Republic of Serbia." While the law does not include a specific provision on hate speech, it is a criminal offense to "incite" national, racial, or religious intolerance. In June 2011 the Constitutional Court banned the extreme right-wing organization Nacionalni Stroj (National Front) for promoting racist hate speech.

The constitution prohibits arbitrary interference with privacy, family, home, or correspondence. While the law requires the Ministry of Interior to obtain a court order before monitoring potential criminal activity and police to obtain a warrant before entering property except to save persons or possessions, police occasionally fail to respect these laws. Most observers believe authorities selectively monitor communications, eavesdrop on conversations, and read mail and e-mail. Human rights leaders also believe that authorities monitor their communications.

The law obliges telecommunications operators to retain for one year data on the source and destination of a communication; the beginning, duration, and end of a communication; the type of communication; terminal equipment identification; and the location of the customer's mobile terminal equipment. While these data can be accessed by intelligence agencies without court permission, a court order is required to access the contents of these communications.

== See also ==
- Telecommunications in Serbia
