= Serbo-Croatian =

South Slavic language

- Bosnian-Croatian-Montenegrin-Serbian
- srpskohrvatski / српскохрватски
- Pronunciation: [sr̩pskoxř̩ʋaːtskiː]
- Native to: Serbia; Croatia; Bosnia and Herzegovina; Montenegro; Kosovo
- Ethnicity: Serbs; Croats; Bosniaks; Montenegrins
- Native speakers: 17 million (2020–2023)
- Language family: Indo-European: Balto-Slavic; Slavic; South Slavic; Western South Slavic; Serbo-Croatian
- Standard forms: Bosnian; Croatian; Montenegrin; Serbian
- Writing system: Latin (Gaj's (Note: The officially codified Montenegrin alphabet for the standard Montenegrin language expands on Gaj's Latin and Serbian Cyrillic alphabets with two additional letters (see the section § Writing systems); these language reforms, however, have not entered everyday use.)); Cyrillic (Serbian); Yugoslav Braille; Formerly: Glagolitic; Arabic (Arebica); Cyrillic (Bosančica)

Official status
- Official language in: Serbia (as Serbian); Croatia (as Croatian); Bosnia and Herzegovina (as Bosnian, Croatian, and Serbian); Montenegro (as Montenegrin); Kosovo (as Serbian); European Union (as Croatian)
- Recognised minority language in: North Macedonia; Hungary; Italy; Romania; Czech Republic; Slovakia
- Regulated by: Board for Standardization of the Serbian Language (Serbian); Institute of Croatian Language (Croatian); Language Institute of the University of Sarajevo (Bosnian); Faculty of Montenegrin Language and Literature (Montenegrin)

Language codes
- ISO 639-1: sh (deprecated)
- ISO 639-3: hbs – inclusive code Individual codes: bos – Bosnian cnr – Montenegrin hrv – Croatian srp – Serbian
- Glottolog: sout1528 Serbian-Croatian-Bosnian
- Linguasphere: 53-AAA-g
- IETF: sh
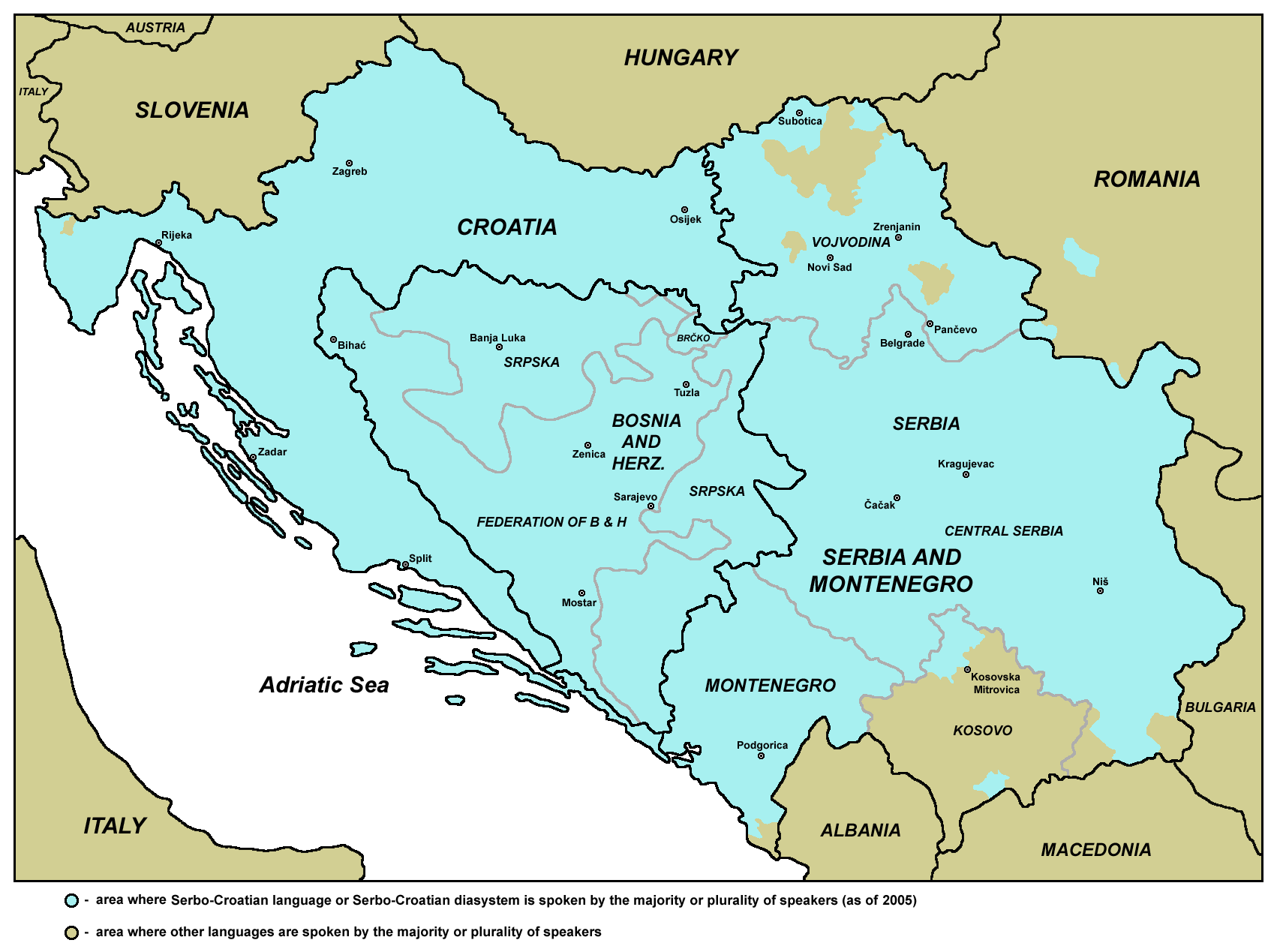
- Areas where Serbo-Croatian is spoken by a plurality of inhabitants (as of 2005)

Serbo-Croatian, (Note: English pronunciation: /ˌsɜːrboʊkroʊˈeɪʃən/ SUR-boh-kroh-AY-shən; alternatively, Serbo-Croat.) also known as Bosnian-Croatian-Montenegrin-Serbian (BCMS), (Note: BCMS expands on earlier designations such as Bosnian-Croatian-Serbian (BCS) or Serbo-Croat-Bosnian (SCB), following the codification and gradual recognition of Montenegrin as a standard language variety distinct from Serbian. These designations have also been alternatively separated with a forward slash (/), i.e. Bosnian/Croatian/Serbian or Bosnian/Croatian/Montenegrin/Serbian.) is a Western South Slavic language and the primary language of Serbia, Croatia, Bosnia and Herzegovina, and Montenegro. It is a pluricentric language with four mutually intelligible standard varieties, namely Serbian, Croatian, Bosnian, and Montenegrin.

The western Balkans' turbulent history, particularly due to the expansion of the Ottoman Empire, led to a complex dialectal and religious mosaic. Due to population migrations, Shtokavian became the most widespread supradialect in the region, encroaching westward into the area previously dominated by Chakavian and Kajkavian. Bosniaks, Croats, and Serbs differ in religion and were historically often part of different cultural spheres, although large portions of these populations lived side by side under foreign rule. During that period, the language was referred to by various names, such as "Slavic" in general, or "Serbian", "Croatian" or "Bosnian" in particular. In a classicizing manner, it was also referred to as "Illyrian".

The standardization of Serbo-Croatian was initiated in the mid-19th-century Vienna Literary Agreement by Croatian and Serbian writers and philologists, decades before a Yugoslav state was established. From the outset, literary Serbian and Croatian exhibited slight differences, although both were based on the same Shtokavian dialect—Eastern Herzegovinian. In the 20th century, Serbo-Croatian served as the lingua franca of the country of Yugoslavia, being the sole official language in the Kingdom of Yugoslavia (when it was called "Serbo-Croato-Slovenian"), and afterwards the official language of four out of six republics of the Socialist Federal Republic of Yugoslavia. The breakup of Yugoslavia influenced language attitudes, leading to the ethnic and political division of linguistic identity. Since then, Bosnian has likewise been established as an official standard in Bosnia and Herzegovina, and efforts to codify a separate Montenegrin standard continue.

Like other South Slavic languages, Serbo-Croatian has a relatively simple phonology, with the common five-vowel system and twenty-five consonants. Its grammar evolved from Common Slavic, with complex inflection, preserving seven grammatical cases in nouns, pronouns, and adjectives. Verbs exhibit imperfective or perfective aspect, with a moderately complex tense system. Serbo-Croatian is a pro-drop language with flexible word order, subject–verb–object being the default. It can be written in either the Latin (Gaj's Latin alphabet) or Cyrillic script (Serbian Cyrillic alphabet), and the orthography is highly phonemic in all standards. Despite the many linguistic similarities among the standard varieties, each possesses distinctive traits, although these differences remain minimal.

== Name ==
Throughout the history of the South Slavs, the vernacular, literary, and written languages (e.g., Chakavian, Kajkavian, Shtokavian) of various regions and ethnic groups developed and diverged independently. Before the 19th century, these languages were collectively called "Illyrian", "Slavic", "Slavonian", "Bosnian", "Dalmatian", "Serbian", or "Croatian". Since the 19th century, the term Illyrian or Illyric was frequently used, sometimes leading to confusion with the ancient Illyrian language. Although the word Illyrian was used occasionally before, its widespread usage began after Ljudevit Gaj and several other prominent linguists met at Ljudevit Vukotinović's house to discuss the issue in 1832. The term Serbo-Croatian was first used by Jacob Grimm in 1824, later popularized by the Viennese philologist Jernej Kopitar, and adopted by Croatian grammarians in Zagreb in 1854 and 1859. At that time, Serb and Croat lands were still part of the Ottoman and Austrian Empires.

Serbo-Croatian is typically referred to by the names of its standardized varieties—Serbian, Croatian, Bosnian, and Montenegrin. It is rarely referred to by the names of its sub-dialects, such as Bunjevac or Šokac. In the language itself, it is formally known as srpskohrvatski, српскохрватски ("Serbo-Croatian") and hrvatskosrpski, хрватскосрпски ("Croato-Serbian"). Historically, linguists and philologists, including Đuro Daničić and Tomislav Maretić, have referred to the language as "Serbian or Croatian" and "Croatian or Serbian". Serbo-Croatian is often colloquially called naš jezik ("our language") or naški (sic. "ourish" or "ourian") by native speakers. This term is frequently used by those who wish to avoid linguistic discussions. Native speakers traditionally describe their language as jedan ali ne jedinstven ("one but not uniform").

In 1988, Croatian linguist Dalibor Brozović advocated the term Serbo-Croatian, stating that, by analogy with Indo-European, it not only denotes the two components of the same language but also delineates the geographical region in which it is spoken, encompassing all language varieties within these boundaries, including Bosnian and Montenegrin. Croatian linguist Mate Kapović suggested Standard Shtokavian as the ethnically neutral and linguistically most precise term. Nowadays, the use of the term "Serbo-Croatian" is controversial due to the widespread perception that national identity and language should correspond. However, it is still used in academic and linguistic contexts due to the lack of a succinct alternative. Following the breakup of Yugoslavia, alternative designations have emerged, such as Bosnian/Croatian/Serbian (BCS), which is frequently used in political contexts, including by the International Criminal Tribunal for the former Yugoslavia.

== History ==
=== Standardization ===
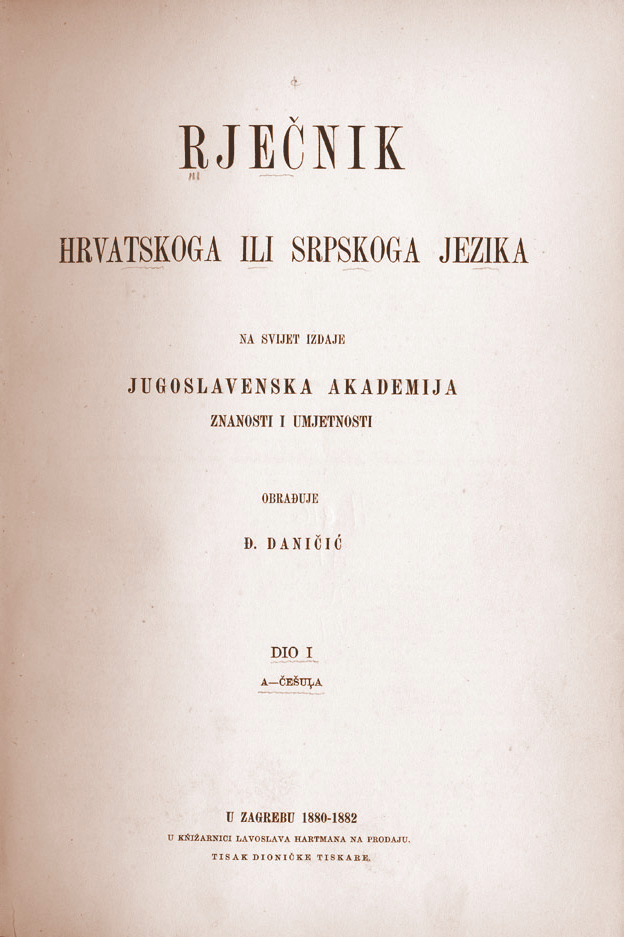
Đuro Daničić, Rječnik hrvatskoga ili srpskoga jezika (Croatian or Serbian Dictionary), 1882

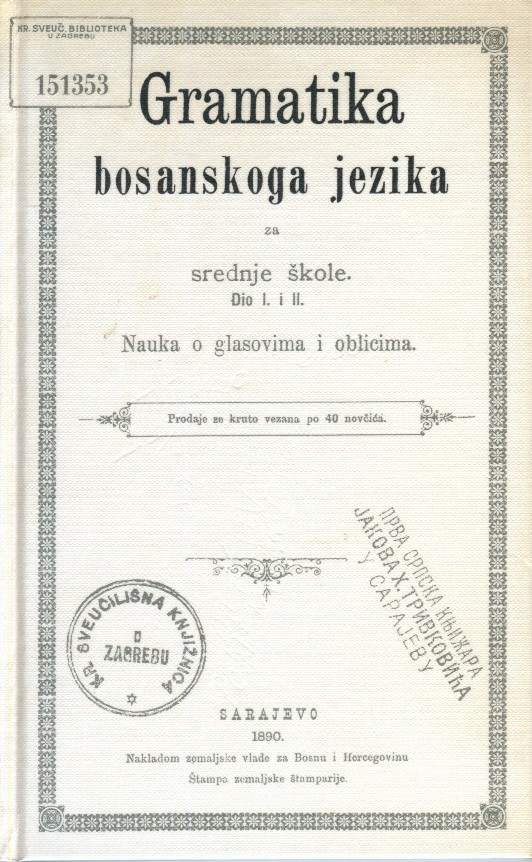
Gramatika bosanskoga jezika (Grammar of the Bosnian Language), 1890

In the mid-19th century, Serbian (led by self-taught writer and folklorist Vuk Stefanović Karadžić) and most Croatian writers and linguists (represented by the Illyrian movement and led by Ljudevit Gaj and Đuro Daničić), proposed the use of the most widespread dialect, Shtokavian, as the base for their common standard language. Karadžić standardised the Serbian Cyrillic alphabet, and Gaj and Daničić standardized the Croatian Latin alphabet, on the basis of vernacular speech phonemes and the principle of phonological spelling. In 1850 Serbian and Croatian writers and linguists signed the Vienna Literary Agreement, declaring their intention to create a unified standard. Thus a complex bi-variant language appeared, which the Serbs officially called "Serbo-Croatian" or "Serbian or Croatian" and the Croats "Croato-Serbian" or "Croatian or Serbian". Yet, in practice, the variants of the conceived common literary language served as different literary variants, chiefly differing in lexical inventory and stylistic devices. The common phrase describing this situation was that Serbo-Croatian or "Croatian or Serbian" was a single language. In 1861, after a long debate, the Croatian Sabor put up several proposed names to a vote of the members of the parliament; "Yugoslavian" was opted for by the majority and legislated as the official language of the Triune Kingdom. The Austrian Empire, suppressing Pan-Slavism at the time, did not confirm this decision and legally rejected the legislation, but in 1867 finally settled on "Croatian or Serbian" instead. During the Austro-Hungarian rule in Bosnia and Herzegovina, the language of all three nations in this territory was declared "Bosnian" until the death of administrator von Kállay in 1907, at which point the name was changed to "Serbo-Croatian".

With unification of the first Kingdom of the Serbs, Croats, and Slovenes, the approach of Karadžić and the Illyrians became dominant. The official language was called "Serbo-Croato-Slovenian" (srpsko-hrvatsko-slovenački) in the 1921 constitution. In 1929, the constitution was suspended, and the country was renamed the Kingdom of Yugoslavia, while the official language of Serbo-Croato-Slovene was reinstated in the 1931 constitution.

In June 1941, the Nazi puppet Independent State of Croatia began to rid the language of "Eastern" (Serbian) words, and shut down Serbian schools. The totalitarian dictatorship introduced a language law that promulgated Croatian linguistic purism as a policy that tried to implement a complete elimination of Serbisms and internationalisms.

On January 15, 1944, the Anti-Fascist Council of the People's Liberation of Yugoslavia (AVNOJ) declared Croatian, Serbian, Slovene, and Macedonian to be equal in the entire territory of Yugoslavia. In 1945 the decision to recognize Croatian and Serbian as separate languages was reversed in favor of a single Serbo-Croatian or Croato-Serbian language. In the Communist-dominated second Yugoslavia, ethnic issues eased to an extent, but the matter of language remained blurred and unresolved.

In 1954, major Serbian and Croatian writers, linguists, and literary critics, backed by Matica srpska and Matica hrvatska signed the Novi Sad Agreement, which in its first conclusion stated: "Serbs, Croats and Montenegrins share a single language with two equal variants that have developed around Zagreb (western) and Belgrade (eastern)". The agreement insisted on the equal status of Cyrillic and Latin scripts, and of Ekavian and Ijekavian pronunciations. It also specified that Serbo-Croatian should be the name of the language in official contexts, while in unofficial use the traditional Serbian and Croatian were to be retained. Matica hrvatska and Matica srpska were to work together on a dictionary, and a committee of Serbian and Croatian linguists was asked to prepare a pravopis. During the sixties both books were published simultaneously in Ijekavian Latin in Zagreb and Ekavian Cyrillic in Novi Sad. Yet Croatian linguists claim that it was an act of unitarianism. The evidence supporting this claim is patchy: Croatian linguist Stjepan Babić complained that the television transmission from Belgrade always used the Latin alphabet—which was true, but was not proof of unequal rights, but of frequency of use and prestige. Babić further complained that the Novi Sad Dictionary (1967) listed side by side words from both the Croatian and Serbian variants wherever they differed, which one can view as proof of careful respect for both variants, and not of unitarism. Moreover, Croatian linguists criticized those parts of the Dictionary for being unitaristic that were written by Croatian linguists. And finally, Croatian linguists ignored the fact that the material for the Pravopisni rječnik came from the Croatian Philological Society. Regardless of these facts, Croatian intellectuals brought the Declaration on the Status and Name of the Croatian Literary Language in 1967. On occasion of the publication's 45th anniversary, the Croatian weekly journal Forum published the Declaration again in 2012, accompanied by a critical analysis.

West European scientists judge the Yugoslav language policy as an exemplary one: although three-quarters of the population spoke one language, no single language was official on a federal level. Official languages were declared only at the level of constituent republics and provinces, and very generously: Vojvodina had five (among them Slovak and Romanian, spoken by 0.5% of the population), and Kosovo four (Albanian, Turkish, Romany, and Serbo-Croatian). Newspapers, radio, and television studios used sixteen languages, fourteen were used as languages of tuition in schools, and nine at universities. Only the Yugoslav People's Army used Serbo-Croatian as the sole language of command, with all other languages represented in the army's other activities; however, this is not different from other armies of multilingual states, or in other specific institutions, such as international air traffic control where English is used worldwide. All variants of Serbo-Croatian were used in state administration and republican and federal institutions. Both Serbian and Croatian variants were represented in respectively different grammar books, dictionaries, school textbooks, and books known as pravopis (which detail spelling rules). Serbo-Croatian was a kind of soft standardisation. However, legal equality could not dampen the prestige Serbo-Croatian had: since it was the language of three-quarters of the population, it functioned as an unofficial lingua franca. And within Serbo-Croatian, the Serbian variant, with twice as many speakers as the Croatian, enjoyed greater prestige, reinforced by the fact that Slovene and Macedonian speakers preferred it to the Croatian variant because their languages are also Ekavian. This is a common situation in other pluricentric languages: for example, the variants of German differ according to their prestige; likewise the variants of Portuguese. Moreover, all languages differ in terms of prestige: "the fact is that languages (in terms of prestige, learnability etc.) are not equal, and the law cannot make them equal".

=== Legal status ===
- 1921 constitution of the Kingdom of the Serbs, Croats, and Slovenes, Article 3: "The official language of the Kingdom is Serbo-Croato-Slovene." (Službeni jezik Kraljevine je srpsko-hrvatski-slovenački.; Службени језик Краљевине је српско-хрватски-словеначки.).
- 1931 constitution of the Kingdom of Yugoslavia, Article 3: "The official language of the Kingdom is Serbo-Croato-Slovene".
- 1963 constitution of the Socialist Federal Republic of Yugoslavia:
  - Article 42: "The languages of the peoples of Yugoslavia and their scripts shall be equal. Members of the peoples of Yugoslavia on the territories of republics other than their own shall have the right to school instruction in their own languages, in conformity with republican law. As an exception, in the Yugoslav People's Army, commands, military drill and administration shall be in the Serbo-Croatian language."
  - Article 131: "The federal laws and other general acts of the federal organs shall be made public in the official gazette of the Federation, in the authentic texts in the languages of the peoples of Yugoslavia: in Serbo-Croatian and Croato-Serbian, Slovene and Macedonian. In official communication the organs of the Federation shall abide by the principle of equality of languages of the peoples of Yugoslavia."
- 1974 constitution of the Socialist Autonomous Province of Kosovo, Article 5: "In the Socialist Autonomous Province of Kosovo, the equality of the Albanian, Serbo-Croatian and Turkish languages and their scripts is guaranteed."
- 1990 constitution of the (Socialist) Republic of Serbia, Article 8: "In the Republic of Serbia, the Serbo-Croatian language and the Cyrillic alphabet are in official use, while the Latin alphabet is in official use in the manner established by law."
- 1993 constitution of the Republic of Bosnia and Herzegovina, Article 4: "In the Republic of Bosnia and Herzegovina, the Serbo-Croatian or Croatian-Serbian language with the Ijekavian pronunciation is in official use. Both scripts — Latin and Cyrillic, are equal."

The 1946, 1953, and 1974 constitutions of the Socialist Federal Republic of Yugoslavia did not name specific official languages at the federal level. The 1992 constitution of the Federal Republic of Yugoslavia, in 2003 renamed Serbia and Montenegro, stated in Article 15: "In the Federal Republic of Yugoslavia, the Serbian language in its ekavian and ijekavian dialects and the Cyrillic script shall be official, while the Latin script shall be in official use as provided for by the Constitution and law."

The term "Serbo-Croatian" (or synonyms) is not officially used in any of the successor countries of former Yugoslavia. The current Serbian constitution of 2006 refers to the official language as Serbian, while the current Montenegrin constitution of 2007 proclaims Montenegrin as the official language but also grants other Serbo-Croatian varieties the right to official use. Croatian is the official language of Croatia, while Serbian is also official in municipalities with significant Serb population. In Bosnia and Herzegovina, all three standard varieties are recorded as official.

In Serbia, the Serbian standard has an official status countrywide, while both Serbian and Croatian are official in the province of Vojvodina. A large Bosniak minority is present in the southwest region of Sandžak, but the "official recognition" of Bosnian is moot. Bosnian is an optional course in first and second grade of the elementary school, while it is also in official use in the municipality of Novi Pazar. However, its nomenclature is controversial, as there is incentive that it is referred to as "Bosniak" (bošnjački) rather than "Bosnian" (bosanski) (see also: Bosnian language#Controversy and recognition).

=== Modern developments ===
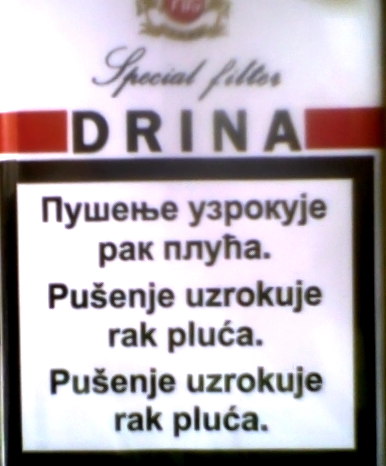
A trilingual health warning printed in both Latin and Cyrillic scripts on a pack of Drina cigarettes, with identical text across all three inscriptions

In 2017, numerous prominent writers, scientists, journalists, activists, and other public figures from Croatia, Bosnia and Herzegovina, Montenegro, and Serbia signed the Declaration on the Common Language, which states that all standard varieties are equal and belong to a common polycentric language, just like German, English, and Spanish.

== Demographics ==
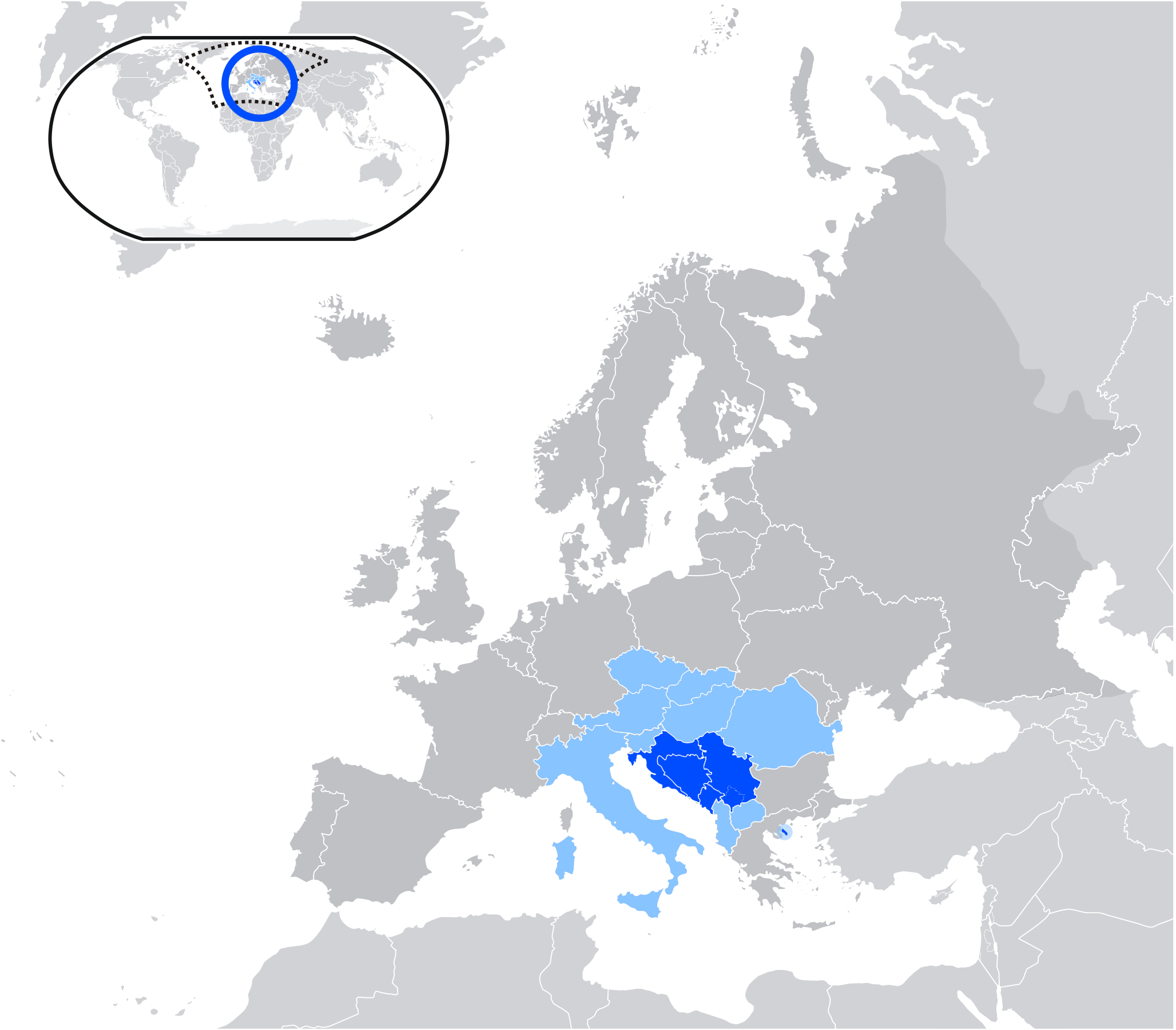
Countries where a standard form of Serbo-Croatian is an official language Countries where one or more forms are designated as minority languages

About 18 million people declare their native language as either "Bosnian", "Croatian", "Serbian", "Montenegrin", or "Serbo-Croatian".

Serbian is spoken by 10 million people around the world, mostly in Serbia (7.8 million), Bosnia and Herzegovina (1.2 million), and Montenegro (300,000). Besides these, Serbian minorities are found in Kosovo, North Macedonia, and Romania. In Serbia, there are about 760,000 second-language speakers of Serbian, including Hungarians in Vojvodina and the 400,000 estimated Roma. In Kosovo, Serbian is spoken by the members of the Serbian minority, which approximates between 70,000 and 100,000. Familiarity of Kosovar Albanians with Serbian varies depending on age and education, and exact numbers are not available.

Croatian is spoken by 6.8 million people in the world, including 4.1 million in Croatia and 600,000 in Bosnia and Herzegovina. A small Croatian minority that lives in Italy, known as Molise Croats, have somewhat preserved traces of Croatian. In Croatia, 170,000, mostly Italians and Hungarians, use it as a second language.

Bosnian is spoken by 2.7 million people worldwide, chiefly Bosniaks, including 2.0 million in Bosnia and Herzegovina, 200,000 in Serbia and 40,000 in Montenegro.

Montenegrin is spoken by 300,000 people globally. The notion of Montenegrin as a separate standard from Serbian is relatively recent. In the 2023 census, around 215,299 Montenegrins, of the country's 623,000, declared Montenegrin as their native language.

Serbo-Croatian is also a second language of many Slovenians and Macedonians, especially those born during the time of Yugoslavia. According to the 2002 census, Serbo-Croatian and its variants have the largest number of speakers of the minority languages in Slovenia.

== Grammar ==
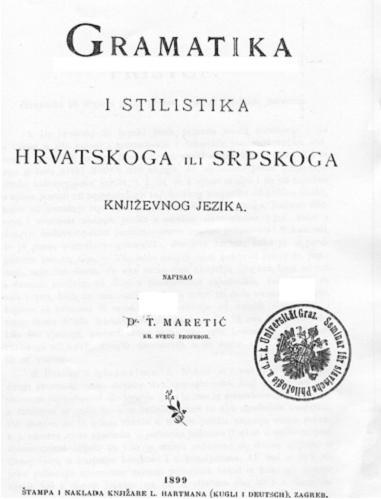
Tomislav Maretić's 1899 Grammar of Croatian or Serbian

Serbo-Croatian is a highly inflected language. Traditional grammars list seven cases for nouns and adjectives: nominative, genitive, dative, accusative, vocative, locative, and instrumental, reflecting the original seven cases of Proto-Slavic, and indeed older forms of Serbo-Croatian itself. However, in modern Shtokavian the locative has almost merged into dative (the only difference is based on accent in some cases), and the other cases can be shown declining; namely:

- For all nouns and adjectives, the instrumental, dative, and locative forms are identical (at least orthographically) in the plural: ženama, ženama, ženama; očima, očima, očima; riječima, riječima, riječima.
- There is an accentual difference between the genitive singular and genitive plural of masculine and neuter nouns, which are otherwise homonyms (seljáka, seljaka) except that on occasion an "a" (which might or might not appear in the singular) is filled between the last letter of the root and the genitive plural ending (kapitalizma, kapitalizama).
- The old instrumental ending "ju" of the feminine consonant stems and in some cases the "a" of the genitive plural of certain other sorts of feminine nouns is fast yielding to "i": noći instead of noćju, borbi instead of boraba and so forth.
- Almost every Shtokavian number is indeclinable, and numbers after prepositions have not been declined for a long time.

Like most Slavic languages, there are mostly three genders for nouns: masculine, feminine, and neuter, a distinction which is still present even in the plural (unlike Russian and, in part, the Čakavian dialect). They also have two numbers: singular and plural. However, some consider there to be three numbers (paucal or dual, too), since (still preserved in closely related Slovene) after two (dva, dvije/dve), three (tri) and four (četiri), and all numbers ending in them (e.g. twenty-two, ninety-three, one hundred four, but not twelve through fourteen) the genitive singular is used, and after all other numbers five (pet) and up, the genitive plural is used. (The number one jedan is treated as an adjective.) Adjectives are placed in front of the noun they modify and must agree with it in both case and number.

There are seven tenses for verbs: past, present, future, exact future, aorist, imperfect, and pluperfect; and three moods: indicative, imperative, and conditional. However, the latter three tenses are typically used only in Shtokavian writing, and the time sequence of the exact future is more commonly formed through an alternative construction.

In addition, like most Slavic languages, the Shtokavian verb also has one of two aspects: perfective or imperfective. Most verbs come in pairs, with the perfective verb being created out of the imperfective by adding a prefix or making a stem change. The imperfective aspect typically indicates that the action is unfinished, in progress, or repetitive; while the perfective aspect typically denotes that the action was completed, instantaneous, or of limited duration. Some Štokavian tenses (namely, aorist and imperfect) favor a particular aspect (but they are rarer or absent in Čakavian and Kajkavian). Actually, aspects "compensate" for the relative lack of tenses, because verbal aspect determines whether the act is completed or in progress in the referred time.

== Phonology ==
=== Vowels ===
The Serbo-Croatian vowel system is simple, with only five vowels in Shtokavian. All vowels are monophthongs. The oral vowels are as follows:

Latin script	Cyrillic script	IPA	Description	English approximation
a	а	/a/	open central unrounded	father
e	е	/e/	mid front unrounded	den
i	и	/i/	close front unrounded	seek
o	о	/o/	mid back rounded	lord
u	у	/u/	close back rounded	pool

The vowels can be short or long, but the phonetic quality does not change depending on the length. In a word, vowels can be long in the stressed syllable and the syllables following it, never in the ones preceding it.

=== Consonants ===
The consonant system is more complicated, and its characteristic features are series of affricate and palatal consonants. As in English, voice is phonemic, but aspiration is not.

Latin script	Cyrillic script	IPA	Description	English approximation
trill
r	р	/r/	alveolar trill	rolled (vibrating) r as in carramba
approximants
v	в	/ʋ/	labiodental approximant	roughly between vortex and war
j	ј	/j/	palatal approximant	year
laterals
l	л	/l/	alveolar lateral approximant	light
lj	љ	/ʎ/	palatal lateral approximant	roughly battalion
nasals
m	м	/m/	bilabial nasal	man
n	н	/n/	alveolar nasal	not
nj	њ	/ɲ/	palatal nasal	British news or American canyon
fricatives
f	ф	/f/	voiceless labiodental fricative	five
z	з	/z/	voiced dental sibilant	zero
s	с	/s/	voiceless dental sibilant	some
ž	ж	/ʒ/	voiced postalveolar fricative	television
š	ш	/ʃ/	voiceless postalveolar fricative	sharp
h	х	/x/	voiceless velar fricative	loch
affricates
c	ц	/t͡s/	voiceless dental sibilant affricate	pots
dž	џ	/d͡ʒ/	voiced postalveolar affricate	jam
č	ч	/t͡ʃ/	voiceless postalveolar affricate	check
đ	ђ	/d͡ʑ/	voiced alveolo-palatal affricate	roughly jeans
ć	ћ	/t͡ɕ/	voiceless alveolo-palatal affricate	roughly cheese
plosives
b	б	/b/	voiced bilabial plosive	book
p	п	/p/	voiceless bilabial plosive	top
d	д	/d/	voiced dental plosive	dog
t	т	/t/	voiceless dental plosive	stop
g	г	/ɡ/	voiced velar plosive	good
k	к	/k/	voiceless velar plosive	duck

In consonant clusters, the consonants are either all voiced or all voiceless. All are voiced if the last consonant is normally voiced, or voiceless if the last consonant is normally voiceless. This rule does not apply to approximants—a consonant cluster may contain voiced approximants and voiceless consonants; nor to foreign words (Washington would be transcribed as VašinGton) or personal names; nor when consonants are not inside of one syllable.

/r/ can be syllabic, playing the role of the syllable nucleus in certain words (occasionally, it can even have a long accent). For example, the tongue-twister navrh brda vrba mrda involves four words with syllabic /r/. A similar feature exists in Czech, Slovak, and Macedonian. Very rarely other sonorants can be syllabic, like /l/ (in bicikl), /ʎ/ (surname Štarklj), /n/ (unit njutn), and /m/ and /ɲ/ in slang.

=== Pitch accent ===
Apart from Slovene, Serbo-Croatian is the only Slavic language with a pitch accent (simple tone) system. This feature is present in some other Indo-European languages, such as Norwegian, Ancient Greek, and Punjabi. Neo-Shtokavian Serbo-Croatian, which is used as the basis for standard Bosnian, Croatian, Montenegrin, and Serbian, has four "accents", which involve either a rising or falling tone on either long or short vowels, with optional post-tonic lengths:

Serbo-Croatian accent system
Slavicist symbol	IPA symbol	Description
e	[e]	non-tonic short vowel
ē	[eː]	non-tonic long vowel
è	[ě]	short vowel with rising tone
é	[ěː]	long vowel with rising tone
ȅ	[ê]	short vowel with falling tone
ȇ	[êː]	long vowel with falling tone

The tone-stressed vowels can be approximated in English with set vs. setting? said in isolation for a short tonic e, or leave vs. leaving? for a long tonic i, due to the prosody of final stressed syllables in English.

General accent rules in the standard language:

1. Monosyllabic words may have only a falling tone (or no accent at all – enclitics);
2. Falling tone may occur only on the first syllable of polysyllabic words;
3. Accent can never occur on the last syllable of polysyllabic words.

There are no other rules for accent placement; thus the accent of every word must be learned individually. Furthermore, in inflection, accent shifts are common, both in type and position (the so-called "mobile paradigms"). The second rule is not strictly obeyed, especially in borrowed words.

Comparative and historical linguistics offer some clues for memorising the accent position: If one compares many standard Serbo-Croatian words to, for example, cognate Russian words, the accent in the Serbo-Croatian word will be one syllable before the one in the Russian word, with the rising tone. Historically, the rising tone appeared when the place of the accent shifted to the preceding syllable (the so-called "Neo-Shtokavian retraction"), but the quality of this new accent was different—its melody still "gravitated" towards the original syllable. Most Shtokavian (Neo-Shtokavian) dialects underwent this shift, but Chakavian, Kajkavian, and the Old-Shtokavian dialects did not.

Accent diacritics are not used in the ordinary orthography, but only in the linguistic or language-learning literature (e.g. dictionaries and orthography and grammar books). However, there are very few minimal pairs where an error in accent can lead to misunderstanding.

== Orthography ==
Serbo-Croatian orthography is almost entirely phonetic. Thus, most words should be spelled as they are pronounced. In practice, the writing system does not take into account allophones which occur as a result of interaction between words:

- bit će – pronounced biće (and written separately only in Bosnian and Croatian)
- od toga – pronounced otoga (in many vernaculars)
- iz čega – pronounced iščega (in many vernaculars)

Also, there are some exceptions, mostly applied to foreign words and compounds, that favor morphological/etymological over phonetic spelling:

- postdiplomski (postgraduate) – pronounced [pôzdiploːmskiː]

One systemic exception is that the consonant clusters ds and dš are not respelled as ts and tš (although d tends to be unvoiced in normal speech in such clusters):

- predstava [prětstaʋa] ('show')
- odšteta [ôtʃteta] ('damages')

Only a few words are intentionally "misspelled", mostly in order to resolve ambiguity:

- šeststo [ʃêːsto] ('six hundred') – pronounced šesto to avoid confusion with "šesto" [sixth], pronounced the same
- prstni [př̩sniː] (adj., 'finger') – pronounced prsni to avoid confusion with "prsni" [pr̩̂sniː] (adj., chest), differentiated by tone in some areas (where the short rising tone contrasts with the short falling tone.

=== Writing systems ===
Through history, this language has been written in a number of writing systems:

- Glagolitic alphabet, chiefly in Croatia.
- Arebica (mostly in Bosnia and Herzegovina).
- Cyrillic script: Serbian Cyrillic and Bosančica
- various modifications of the Latin and Greek alphabets.

The oldest texts since the 11th century are in Glagolitic, and the oldest preserved text written completely in the Latin alphabet is Red i zakon sestara reda Svetog Dominika, from 1345. The Arabic alphabet had been used by Bosniaks; Greek writing is out of use there, and Arabic and Glagolitic persisted so far partly in religious liturgies.

The Serbian Cyrillic alphabet was revised by Vuk Stefanović Karadžić in the 19th century. The Croatian Latin alphabet (Gajica) followed suit shortly afterwards, when Ljudevit Gaj defined it as standard Latin with five extra letters that had diacritics, apparently borrowing much from Czech, but also from Polish. All in all, this makes Serbo-Croatian the only Slavic language to officially use both the Latin and Cyrillic scripts (though the Latin version is more commonly used).

In both cases, spelling is phonetic and spellings in the two alphabets map to each other one-to-one:

Latin to Cyrillic
A	a	B	b	C	c	Č	č	Ć	ć	D	d	Dž	dž	Đ	đ	E	e	F	f	G	g	H	h	I	i	J	j	K	k
А	а	Б	б	Ц	ц	Ч	ч	Ћ	ћ	Д	д	Џ	џ	Ђ	ђ	Е	е	Ф	ф	Г	г	Х	х	И	и	Ј	ј	К	к
L	l	Lj	lj	M	m	N	n	Nj	nj	O	o	P	p	R	r	S	s	Š	š	T	t	U	u	V	v	Z	z	Ž	ž
Л	л	Љ	љ	М	м	Н	н	Њ	њ	О	о	П	п	Р	р	С	с	Ш	ш	Т	т	У	у	В	в	З	з	Ж	ж

Cyrillic to Latin
А	а	Б	б	В	в	Г	г	Д	д	Ђ	ђ	Е	е	Ж	ж	З	з	И	и	Ј	ј	К	к	Л	л	Љ	љ	М	м
A	a	B	b	V	v	G	g	D	d	Đ	đ	E	e	Ž	ž	Z	z	I	i	J	j	K	k	L	l	Lj	lj	M	m
Н	н	Њ	њ	О	о	П	п	Р	р	С	с	Т	т	Ћ	ћ	У	у	Ф	ф	Х	х	Ц	ц	Ч	ч	Џ	џ	Ш	ш
N	n	Nj	nj	O	o	P	p	R	r	S	s	T	t	Ć	ć	U	u	F	f	H	h	C	c	Č	č	Dž	dž	Š	š

Sample collation
Latin collation order		Cyrillic collation order
Latin	Cyrillic equivalent	Cyrillic collation order
Ina	Ина	Ина
Injekcija	Инјекција	Инјекција
Inverzija	Инверзија	Инверзија
Inje	Иње	Иње

The digraphs ⟨Lj⟩, ⟨Nj⟩, and ⟨Dž⟩ represent distinct phonemes and are considered to be single letters. In crosswords, they are put into a single square, and in sorting, lj follows l and nj follows n, except in a few words where the individual letters are pronounced separately. For instance, nadživ(j)eti "to outlive" is composed of the prefix nad- "out, over" and the verb živ(j)eti "to live". The Cyrillic alphabet avoids such ambiguity by providing a single letter for each phoneme: наджив(ј)ети.

⟨Đ⟩ used to be commonly written as ⟨Dj⟩ on typewriters, but that practice led to too many ambiguities. It is also used on car registration plates. Today ⟨Dj⟩ is often used again in place of ⟨Đ⟩ on the Internet as a replacement due to the lack of installed Serbo-Croat keyboard layouts.

Serbian, Bosnian and Montenegrin standards officially use both alphabets, while Croatian uses the Latin only.

Latin script has been rising in popularity in Serbia with the advent of the digital age and Internet in Serbia, whether due to restraints (Cyrillic letters use up twice the space and therefore cost on SMS), accessibility (intention to be readable internationally, as the Latin alphabet is taught in all four countries speaking the language), or ease of use. This has been perceived by Serbian government officials as a suppression and a threat to the existence of the national script that is Cyrillic, with the Ministry of Culture and Information of Serbia pushing for tighter language laws in addition to those stipulated by the existing Constitution.

The Montenegrin alphabet, adopted in 2009, provides replacements of ⟨sj⟩ and ⟨zj⟩ with an addition of an acute accent on ⟨s⟩ and ⟨z⟩, forming ⟨ś⟩ and ⟨ź⟩ in both Latin and Cyrillic, but they remain largely unused, even by the Parliament of Montenegro which introduced them.

Unicode has separate characters for three of the digraphs:

- ⟨lj⟩: ⟨Ǉ⟩, ⟨ǈ⟩, ⟨ǉ⟩
- ⟨nj⟩: ⟨Ǌ⟩, ⟨ǋ⟩, ⟨ǌ⟩
- ⟨dž⟩: ⟨Ǆ⟩, ⟨ǅ⟩, ⟨ǆ⟩.

== Dialectology ==
South Slavic historically formed a dialect continuum, i.e., each dialect has some similarities with the neighboring one, and differences grow with distance. However, migrations from the 16th to 18th centuries resulting from the spread of the Ottoman Empire throughout the Balkans have caused large-scale population displacement that broke the dialect continuum into many geographical pockets. Migrations in the 20th century, caused primarily by urbanization and wars, also contributed to the reduction of dialectal differences.

The primary dialects are named after the most common question word for what: Shtokavian uses the pronoun što or šta, Chakavian uses ča or ca, Kajkavian (kajkavski), kaj or kej. In native terminology they are referred to as nar(j)ečje, which would be equivalent of "group of dialects", whereas their many subdialects are referred to as dijalekti "dialects" or govori "speeches".

On the Serbo-Croatian language area, "no single dialectal characteristic exists that serves as a common trait for all members of one nation as opposed to another." The pluricentric Serbo-Croatian standard language and all four contemporary standard variants are based on the Eastern Herzegovinian subdialect of Neo-Shtokavian. Other dialects are not taught in schools or used by the state media. The Torlak dialect is often added to the list, though sources usually note that it is a dialect transitional between Shtokavian and the Bulgaro-Macedonian dialects.

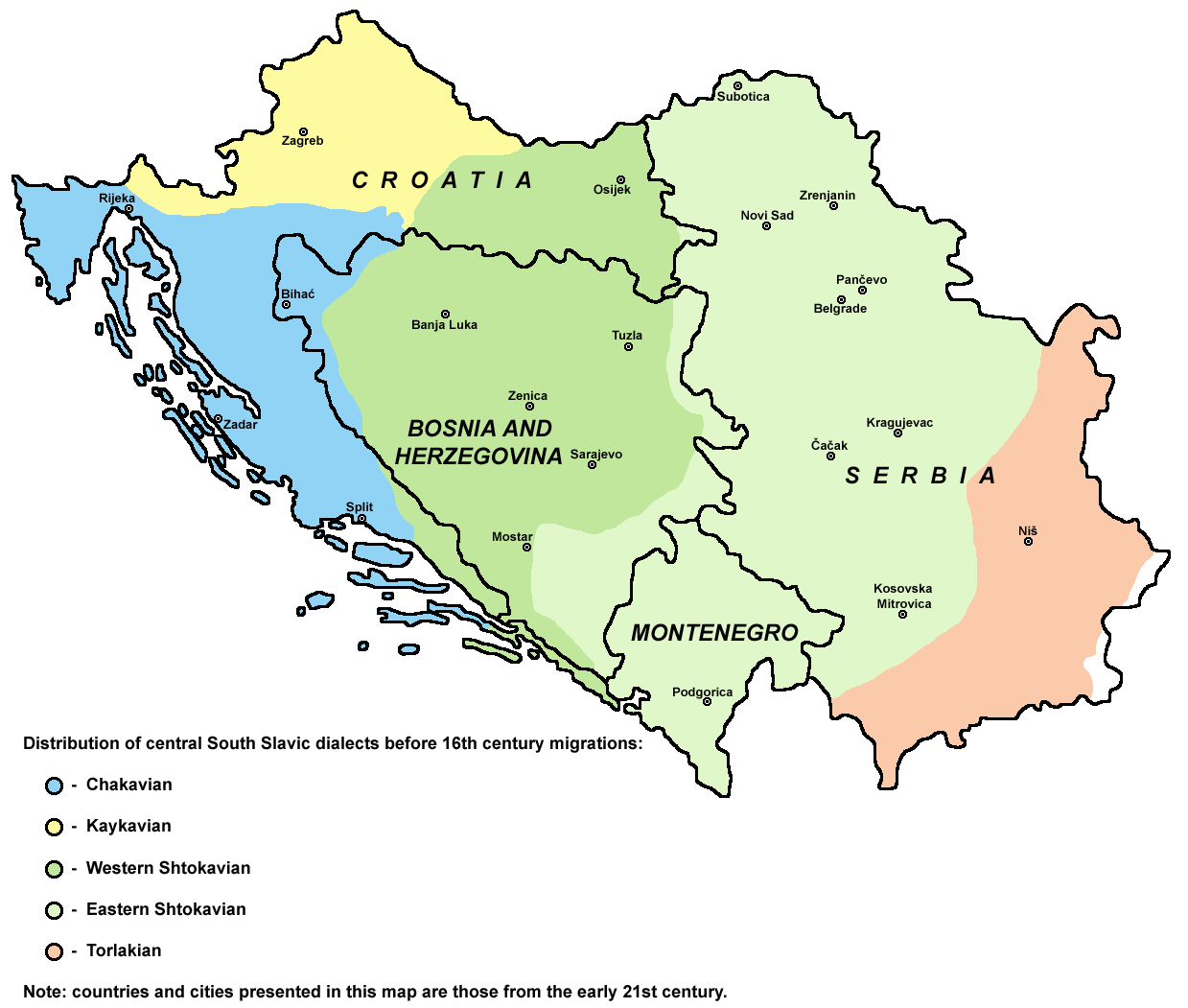
Map of distribution of supradialects prior to the 16th-century migrations

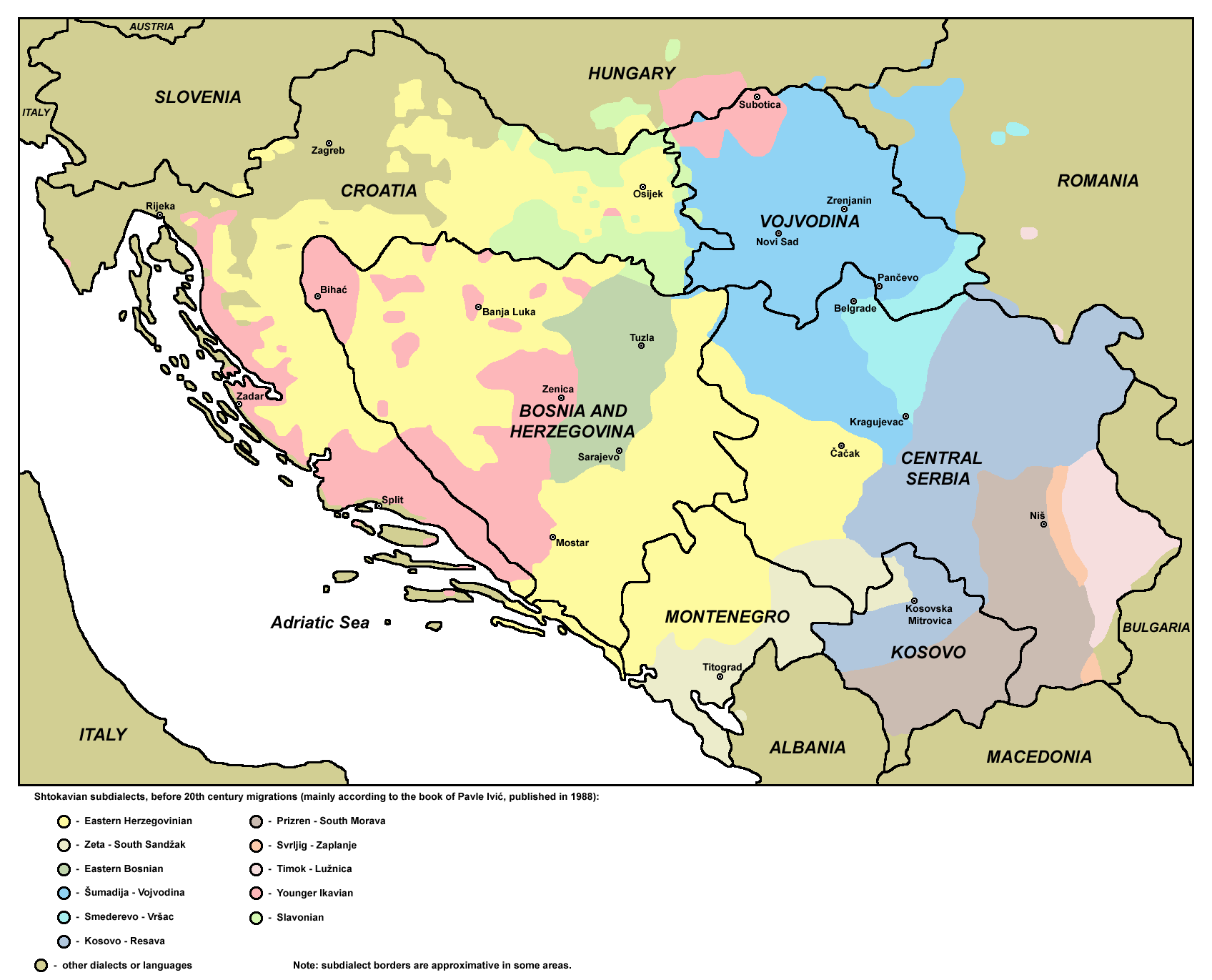
Map of distribution of Shtokavian subdialects prior to the 20th-century migrations. The Eastern Herzegovinian subdialect, shown in yellow, forms the basis of all standard varieties of Serbo-Croatian.

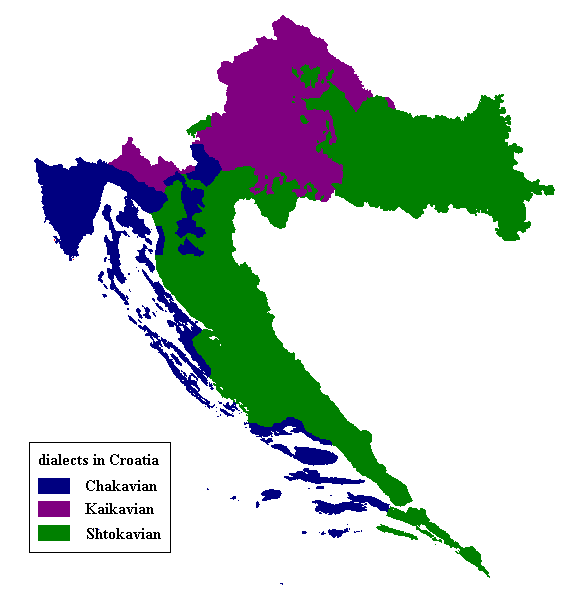
Map of distribution of dialects in Croatia, mid-20th century

The Serbo-Croatian dialects differ not only in the question word they are named after, but also heavily in phonology, accentuation and intonation, case endings and tense system (morphology) and basic vocabulary. In the past, Chakavian and Kajkavian dialects were spoken on a much larger territory, but were replaced by Štokavian during the period of migrations caused by Ottoman Turkish conquest of the Balkans in the 15th and the 16th centuries. These migrations caused the koinéisation of the Shtokavian dialects, that used to form the West Shtokavian (more closer and transitional towards the neighbouring Chakavian and Kajkavian dialects) and East Shtokavian (transitional towards the Torlak and the whole Bulgaro-Macedonian area) dialect bundles, and their subsequent spread at the expense of Chakavian and Kajkavian. As a result, Štokavian now covers an area larger than all the other dialects combined, and continues to make its progress in the enclaves where non-literary dialects are still being spoken.

=== Classification by yat reflex ===
A series of isoglosses crosscuts the main dialects. The modern reflexes of the long Common Slavic vowel yat, usually transcribed *ě, vary by location as /i/, /e/, and /ije/ or /je/. Local varieties of the dialects are labeled Ikavian, Ekavian, and Ijekavian, respectively, depending on the reflex. The long and short yat is reflected as long or short */i/ and /e/ in Ikavian and Ekavian, but Ijekavian dialects introduce a ije/je alternation to retain a distinction.

Standard Croatian and Bosnian are based on Ijekavian, whereas Serbian uses both Ekavian and Ijekavian forms (Ijekavian for Bosnian Serbs, Ekavian for most of Serbia). Influence of standard language through state media and education has caused non-standard varieties to lose ground to the literary forms.

The yat-reflex rules are not without exception. For example, when short yat is preceded by r, in most Ijekavian dialects developed into /re/ or, occasionally, /ri/. The prefix prě- ("trans-, over-") when long became pre- in eastern Ijekavian dialects but to prije- in western dialects; in Ikavian pronunciation, it also evolved into pre- or prije- due to potential ambiguity with pri- ("approach, come close to"). For verbs that had -ěti in their infinitive, the past participle ending -ěl evolved into -io in Ijekavian Neo-Štokavian.

The following are some examples:

English	Predecessor	Ekavian	Ikavian	Ijekavian	Ijekavian development
beautiful	*lěp	lep	lip	lijep	long ě → ije
time	*vrěme	vreme	vrime	vrijeme	long ě → ije
faith	*věra	vera	vira	vjera	short ě → je
crossing	*prělaz	prelaz	prilaz	prijelaz or prelaz	pr + long ě → prije
times	*vrěmena	vremena	vrimena	vremena	r + short ě → re
need	*trěbati	trebati	tribat(i)	trebati	r + short ě → re
heat	*grějati	grejati	grijati	grijati	r + short ě → ri
saw	*viděl	video	vidio	vidio	ěl → io
village	*selo	selo	selo	selo	e in root, not ě

== Sociolinguistic debate ==
The nature and classification of Serbo-Croatian has been the subject of long-standing sociolinguistic debate. The question is whether Serbo-Croatian should be called a single language or a cluster of closely related languages.

=== Views of linguists in the former Yugoslavia ===
==== Views of Croatian linguists ====
A prevailing view among Croatian linguists is that there has never been a Serbo-Croatian language, but rather two different standard languages that overlapped sometime in the course of history. However, Croatian linguist Snježana Kordić led an academic discussion on this issue in the Croatian journal Književna republika from 2001 to 2010. The editor of that magazine says: "I encouraged prominent Croatian linguists to respond to her. However, after a while it became obvious to everyone that Kordić was superior in the discussions". In the discussion, she shows that linguistic criteria such as mutual intelligibility, the huge overlap in the linguistic system, and the same dialect basis of the standard language are evidence that Croatian, Serbian, Bosnian, and Montenegrin are four national variants of the pluricentric Serbo-Croatian language. In 2010, Croatian writer Igor Mandić described the debate as "the longest, most thorough, and most incisive polemic [...] in 21st-century Croatian culture". Inspired by that discussion, a monograph on language and nationalism was published in 2010.

Some Croatian linguists, like Kordić, continue to argue that Serbo-Croatian is a single language. They argue that the Serbo-Croatian standard varieties (Bosnian, Croatian, Montenegrin, and Serbian) are completely mutually intelligible. In addition, Gaj's Latin and Serbian Cyrillic alphabets perfectly match each other due to the work of Ljudevit Gaj and Vuk Karadžić. Linguists supporting this perspective often cite the Swadesh list of 100 basic vocabulary items, which are identical across all four Serbo-Croatian varieties. According to Swadesh's criteria, an 81% overlap is sufficient to classify varieties as a single language. Furthermore, the standard varieties are typologically and structurally nearly identical in terms of grammar, including morphology and syntax. Serbo-Croatian was standardized in the mid-19th century, and subsequent efforts to dissolve its linguistic unity are seen by some scholars as politically motivated. According to phonology, morphology, and syntax, these standard varieties are considered part of the single language as they are all based on the Štokavian dialect.

On the other hand, a number of Croatian linguists argue against the view that Serbo-Croatian constitutes a single language. They acknowledge that similar arguments are made for other official standards derived from nearly identical material bases, such as Malaysian Malay and Indonesian (together called Malay), or Hindi and Urdu (together called Hindustani). However, they argue that these arguments have flaws, as phonology, morphology, and syntax are not the only defining features of a language. Other fields—semantics, pragmatics, stylistics, and lexicology—also exhibit differences. However, that is the case with other pluricentric languages. Some comparisons are drawn to the closely related North Germanic languages, although these languages are not fully mutually intelligible as the Serbo-Croatian standard varieties are.

Additionally, it is argued that the standardization of the Croatian language was a gradual process spanning several centuries. Croatian drew on Chakavian and Kajkavian influences, on the Dubrovnik subdialect—a specific western idiom of the Eastern Herzegovinian dialect rooted in Western Shtokavian—and on Western Shtokavian more generally. By contrast, Serbian draws primarily from Eastern Shtokavian, which includes the Eastern Herzegovinian dialect. Since the Croatian used in early Ragusan literature (e.g., in the works of Držić and Gundulić in the 16th and 17th centuries) is virtually the same as contemporary standard Croatian, aside from archaisms, the 19th-century formal standardization is considered by Croatian linguists to be the final step in a process that had already lasted over three centuries.

==== Views of Serbian linguists ====
In 2021, the Board for Standardization of the Serbian Language issued an opinion that Serbo-Croatian is one language, and that it should be referred to as "Serbian language", while "Croatian", "Bosnian", and "Montenegrin" are to be considered merely local names for Serbian language. This opinion was widely criticized by the Croatian government and representatives of the Croatian minority in Serbia. Serbian linguist Ranko Bugarski called this opinion "absurd" and a "legacy of the 19th century linguistics". He said that Serbo-Croatian should be considered one language in a scientific sense under the "Serbo-Croatian" label, but four different languages in an administrative sense. Legally, Croatian, Bosnian, and Montenegrin are all officially recognized minority languages in Serbia. The Serbian Government also officially recognized the Bunjevac language as a standard minority language in 2018, and the Serbian Ministry of Education approved it for learning in schools.

==== Views within nationalist linguistics ====
In nationalist linguistics there exist conflicting views on shared or related linguistical heritage. Those nationalists among the Croats claim either that they speak an entirely separate language from Serbs and Bosniaks or, contradictorily, that these two peoples have, due to the longer literary and lexicographic tradition of popular language among Croats, somehow "borrowed" their standard languages from them (e.g., Serbian literature until the early 19th century was written primarily in a Serbian recension of Church Slavonic and Slavonic-Serbian). There's a common debate about the positive or negative influence of the Croatian Vukovians, and the perception that Vuk Karadžić invented the Greater Serbian linguistic ideology which is culturally appropriating Croatian language, dialects, and literary tradition (although a great part of the criticism should be directed to the early Slavicists instead). Bosniak nationalists claim that both Croats and Serbs have "appropriated" the Bosnian language, since Ljudevit Gaj and Vuk Karadžić preferred the Neo-Štokavian Ijekavian dialect, widely spoken in Bosnia and Herzegovina, as the basis for language standardization. Whereas the nationalists among the Serbs claim either that any divergence in the standard language is artificial, and that the whole Shtokavian dialect is Serbian (and hence the Croatian, Bosnian, and Montenegrin standard languages are variations of the Serbian language), and only the Chakavian and Kajkavian dialects are Croatian, in more extreme formulations accusing the Croats to have "taken" or "stolen" their language from the Serbs.

=== Views of international linguists ===
Linguist Enisa Kafadar argues that there is only one Serbo-Croatian language with several varieties. This has made it possible to include all four varieties in new grammars of the language. Daniel Bunčić concludes that it is a pluricentric language, with four standard variants spoken in Serbia, Croatia, Montenegro, and Bosnia-Herzegovina. The mutual intelligibility between their speakers "exceeds that between the standard variants of English, French, German, or Spanish". "There is no doubt of the near 100% mutual intelligibility of (standard) Croatian and (standard) Serbian, as is obvious from the ability of all groups to enjoy each others' films, TV and sports broadcasts, newspapers, rock lyrics etc." Other linguists have argued that the differences between the variants of Serbo-Croatian are less significant than those between the variants of English, German, Dutch, and Hindustani.

Among pluricentric languages, Serbo-Croatian was the only one with a pluricentric standardisation within one state. The dissolution of Yugoslavia has made Serbo-Croatian even more of a typical pluricentric language, since the variants of other pluricentric languages are also spoken in different states.

As in other pluricentric languages, all Serbo-Croatian standard varieties are based on the same dialect (the Eastern Herzegovinian subdialect of the Shtokavian dialect) and consequently, according to the sociolinguistic definitions, constitute a single pluricentric language (and not, for example, several Ausbau languages). According to linguist John Bailyn, "An examination of all the major 'levels' of language shows that BCS is clearly a single language with a single grammatical system."

The prevailing view among Croatian linguists—that there is no single Serbo-Croatian language but rather several different standard languages—has been criticized by German linguist Bernhard Gröschel in his monograph Serbo-Croatian Between Linguistics and Politics.

The use of Serbo-Croatian as a linguistic label has been the subject of long-standing controversy. Linguist Wayles Browne calls it a "term of convenience" and notes the difference of opinion as to whether it comprises a single language or a cluster of languages. Ronelle Alexander refers to the national standards as three separate languages, but also notes that the reasons for this are complex and generally non-linguistic. She calls BCS (her term for Serbo-Croatian) a single language for communicative linguistic purposes, but three separate languages for symbolic non-linguistic purposes.

=== Views of international organizations ===
While it operated, the International Criminal Tribunal for the former Yugoslavia translated court proceedings and documents into what it referred to as "Bosnian/Croatian/Serbian", usually abbreviated as BCS. Translators were employed from all regions of the former Yugoslavia and all national and regional variations were accepted, regardless of the nationality of the person on trial (sometimes against a defendant's objections), on the grounds of mutual intelligibility.

Since February 18, 2000, the ISO 639 classification has recognized Serbo-Croatian as a macrolanguage, deprecating its original ISO 639-1 code sh. In ISO 639-3, Serbo-Croatian is assigned the code hbs, which has no equivalent in ISO 639-2.

Although the ISO 639‑1 code sh has been deprecated, it remains recognized as an IETF language tag under BCP 47.

The International Organization for Standardization (ISO) has also defined a Universal Decimal Classification (UDC) number for the Serbo-Croatian language group (811.163.4), with subdivisions for Serbian (811.163.41) and Croatian (811.163.42).

== Serbo-Croatian loanwords in English ==
- cravat, from French cravate "Croat", by analogy with Flemish Krawaat and German Krabate, from Serbo-Croatian Hrvat, as cravats were characteristic of Croatian dress
- polje, from Serbo-Croatian polje "field"
- slivovitz, from German Slibowitz, from Bulgarian slivovitza or Serbo-Croatian šljivovica "plum brandy", from Old Slavic *sliva "plum" (cognate with English sloe)
- tamburitza, Serbo-Croatian tamburica, diminutive of tambura, from Turkish, from Persian ṭambūr "tanbur"
- uvala, from Serbo-Croatian uvala "hollow"
- vampire, from Serbo-Croatian vampir via German Vampir or French vampire

== See also ==
- Comparison of Serbo-Croatian standard varieties
- Relative clause § Serbo-Croatian
- Serbo-Croatian kinship
