= Ivan Kukuljević Sakcinski =

Croatian politician (1816–1889)

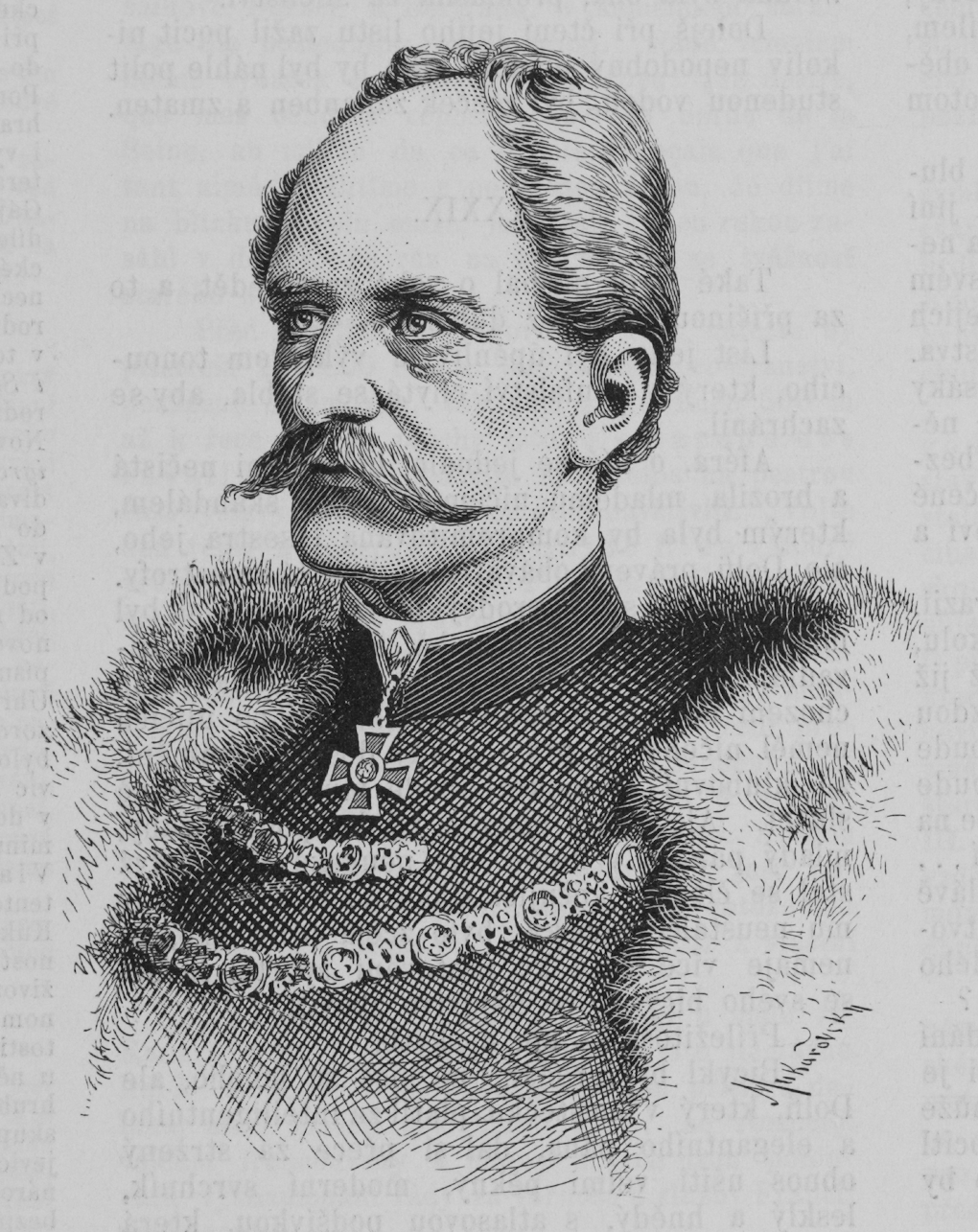
- A portrait of Kukuljević by Josef Mukařovský, 1889
- Born: 29 May 1816; Varaždin, Kingdom of Croatia, Austrian Empire
- Died: 1 August 1889 (aged 73); Puhakovec near Pustodol Začretski, Croatia-Slavonia, Austria-Hungary
- Occupations: politician, bibliographer, historian
- Known for: Illyrian movement activism, giving the first speech in Croatian in the Croatian parliament
- Spouse: Kornelija Novak (m. 1848)
- Children: Milutin Kukuljević Sakcinski

Ivan Kukuljević Sakcinski (pronounced [ǐʋan kukǔːʎeʋit͡ɕ sǎkt͡sinskiː]; 29 May 1816 – 1 August 1889) was a Croatian historian, politician, and writer, most famous for delivering the first speech in Croatian before Parliament. Considered a renowned patriot, Kukuljević was a proponent of Illyrian movement and avid collector of historical documents, primarily those for his work in Croatian historiography and bibliography.

== Early life ==
Kukuljević was born in Varaždin. He grew up on the family estate in Jurketinec, but was soon sent for schooling to Zajezda and then to Varaždinske Toplice. His family owned a number of estates in Hrvatsko Zagorje, including Jurketinec, Tonimir near Varaždinske Toplice and Puhakovec near Sveti Križ Začretje, and he spent some time in his life in each of these. Kukuljević Sakcinski himself wrote that a manuscript history of his family said they came from the environs of Imotski to Senj at the turn of the 17th century, then moving elsewhere in central Croatia and finally settling in Varaždin. Historian Josip Matasović wrote that the family originated from Rama in Bosnia. He was also a distant relative of Grgo Martić, a Bosnian Franciscan.

Kukuljević completed his secondary education in gymnasiums in his hometown and in Zagreb. He went to the Military Academy of Krems. As a student, Kukuljević started writing in German. In 1833, he joined the army and became an officer in Vienna three years later. He met Ljudevit Gaj and joined the Illyrian movement in 1837. He was ordered to move to Milan in 1840. In 1842, he resigned from his military duties and returned to Croatia, joining the political fight against Magyarization and censorship. He became one of the leaders of the Illyrian movement.

== Politician ==
Kukuljević was a member of the People's Party and was one of its leading members as early as 1843.

The political activity of Kukuljević can be separated into two periods: until 1850 and from 1860 to 1867. The gap from 1851 to 1860 was caused by the absolutism instituted by Minister Bach, which repressed political life in Croatia. In the first period, he was a partisan of the liberation of Croatia from Austria and Hungary, an uncompromising ideologue promoting revolutionary actions to achieve the unity of the South Slavs. Believing that the South Slavs can be delivered and unified only by force of arms, he lobbied among the Croats and Serbs at the Military Frontier. Swayed by his personality, the frontiersmen asked for the freedom and unity of the South Slav peoples in their People's Requests of spring 1848, referring to him as their inspiration.

Kukuljević was the first to make a speech in Croatian before the Croatian Parliament, on May 2, 1843. The speech promoted the struggle for national liberation, asking for Croatian to become the official language in schools and offices, with its gradual introduction in the public life. He also pointed out the danger of replacing Croatian with other languages. Until then, the language of discourse in the parliament was Latin. The speech caused much agitation. It was not an exception, though. All his speeches in the parliament and at county assemblies staunchly advocated the freedom and independence of Croatia, so they could be published only in Branislav, an illegal Illyrian magazine printed in Belgrade. On Kukuljević's urging, the parliament passed the decision to make Croatian the official language in 1847.

He became the chief judge of Varaždin County in 1845. During the Revolutions of 1848, Kukuljević was among the radical democrats. Under his influence, the ban Josip Jelačić convened the Croatian Parliament on June 5, 1848, opposing the explicit imperial order. Kukuljević also initiated the Slavic Congress in Prague.

However, the revolutions were crushed and imperial oppression set in. Kukuljević was removed from politics and kept under police surveillance. In the 1850s, his outlook radically changed. The second period of his political activity was the complete opposite of his early anti-Austrian and nationalist sentiments. After he became the prefect of Zagreb County in 1861, he was loyal to Vienna, implementing policies targeted against Croats and the South Slavs and hounding his former friends who remained faithful to their Illyrian ideals.

After the Compromise of 1867, he was removed from political positions and retired. He was later again elected to the Sabor. He died at the Puhakovec estate in Zagorje and was buried in Zagreb's Mirogoj Cemetery.

== Historian and cultural figure ==
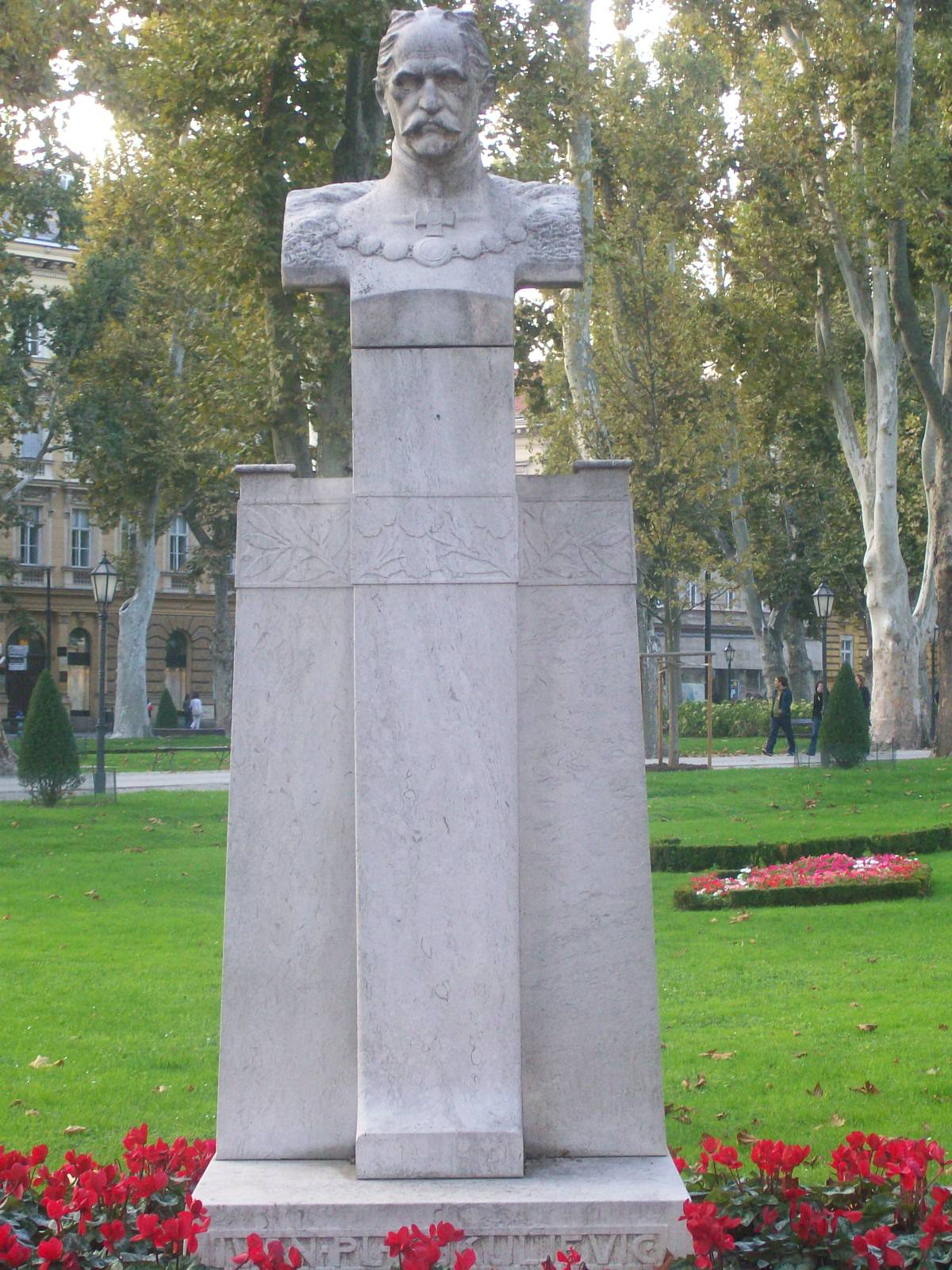
Statue of Ivan Kukuljević Sakcinski in Zagreb's Nikola Šubić Zrinski Square

Despite the sharp turn in his later political career, the early patriotic and historical poems of Kukuljević had a major influence on the patriotic sentiments among the Croats. He founded the Society for Yugoslavian History, edited the magazine called Arhiv za Povjesnicu jugoslavensku (Archive for Yugoslavian History), and published valuable historical monographs. Kukuljević's efforts earned him the title of the "father of modern Croatian historiography".

Kukuljević collected and published many source texts related to the history of Croatia. He wrote a lexicon with 800 artists' biographies. He is considered a pioneer of Croatian scientific bibliography.

In 1850, Kukuljević took part in the Vienna Literary Agreement.

Kukuljević was a prolific collector of Glagolitic manuscripts. Without him, many more would have perished. For example, during his visit to the monastery in Glavotok, the Italian abbot allowed him to take whatever Glagolitic manuscripts he wanted, but when the same abbot later found a number of Glagolitic manuscripts in a corner, he threw them in the sea, considering them "worthless cockroaches" (Italian: scarafacci senza valore). Ivan Milčetić recalled from his days in the Rijeka Gymnasium 1865–1873 that children back home in Dubašnica would send Kukuljević whatever Glagolitic manuscripts they could find in exchange for small coins (Serbo-Croatian: petače).

Kukuljević's Glagolitic note of purchase in Rule of Saint Benedict copy he designated Cod. Glag. X

Due to financial problems, Kukuljević was forced to sell his enormous library, numbering 12,000 volumes, which was acquired by the Croatian Academy of Arts and Sciences in Zagreb. One of manuscripts from his library is a tragedy, Skanderbeg, written on the basis of Andrija Kačić Miošić's work.

== Works ==
- Glasoviti Hrvati prošlih vjekova (Famous Croats of Ages Past)
- Slovnik umjetnikah jugoslavenskih od Ivana Kukuljevica Sakcinskoga
- Juran i Sofia ili Turci kod Siska: junačka igra u trih činih (Juran and Sofia or the Turks under Sisak: Heroic Play in Three Acts)
- Beatrica Frankopan i njezin rod (Beatrice Frankopan and Her Lineage)
- Pjesnici hrvatski 16 vieka by Ivan Kukuljević Sakcinski, Kršćan. Sadašnjost (reprint), 1983
- Borba Hrvatah: S Mongoli i Tatari: Povjestno-Kriticna Razprava by Ivan Kukuljević Sakcinski, Nakladom i brzotiskom A.Jakica, 1863
- Slavjanke: sa historičkimi primetbami by Ivan Kukuljević Sakcinski, Tiskom Franje Župana, 1848
- Monumenta historica Slavorum meriodionalium by Ivan Kukuljević Sakcinski, Društvo za Jugoslavensku povjest i starine, Brzotiskom narodne tiskarnice dra. Ljudevita Gaja
- Jure Glović, prozvan Julijo Klovio, hrvatski sitnoslikar (Jure Glović aka Giulio Clovio, Croatian miniaturist)
- Cronaca del secolo XVI - mentioned in When ethnicity did not matter in the Balkans: a study of identity in pre-nationalist Croatia, Dalmatia, and Slavonia in the Medieval and Early-Modern Periods by John Van Antwerp Fine

== See also ==
- Vienna Literary Agreement

== Notes ==
Cultural offices
Preceded by Matija Mesić	President of Matica hrvatska 1874–1889	Succeeded by Tadija Smičiklas
