= Vienna Literary Agreement =

1850 literary agreement

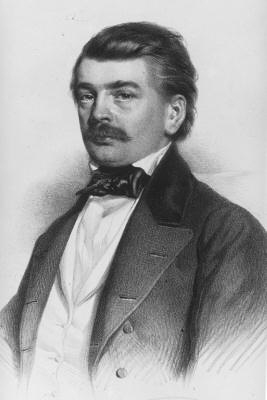
Franz Miklosich

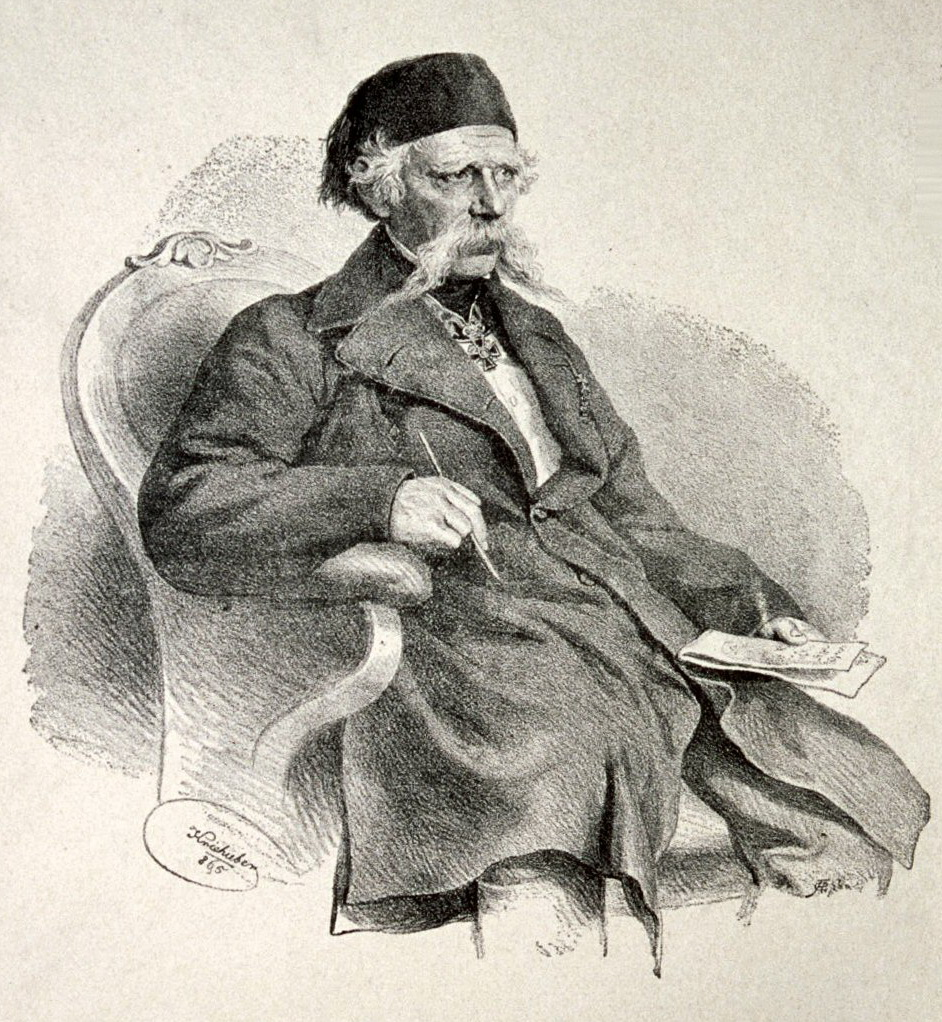
Vuk Karadžić

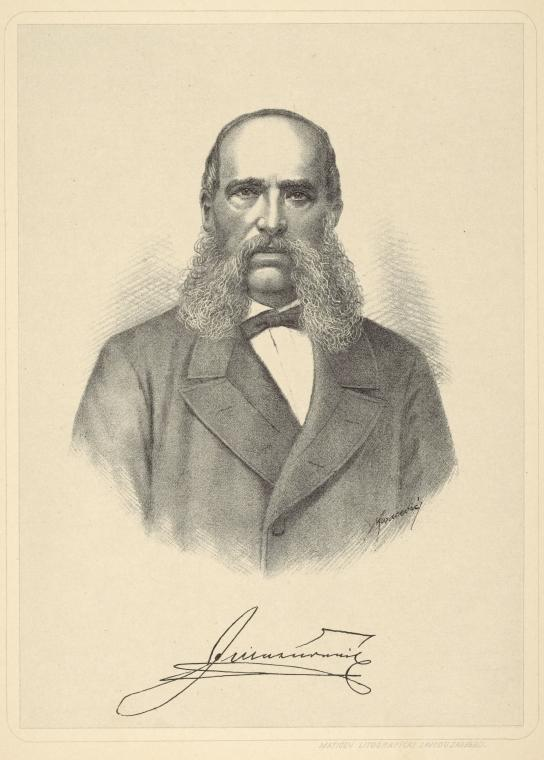
Ivan Mažuranić

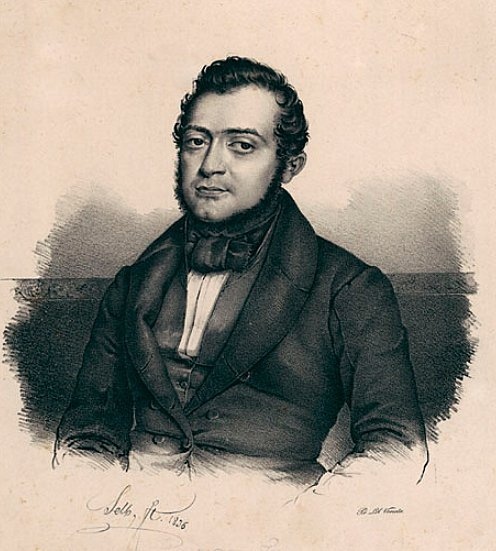
Dimitrije Demeter

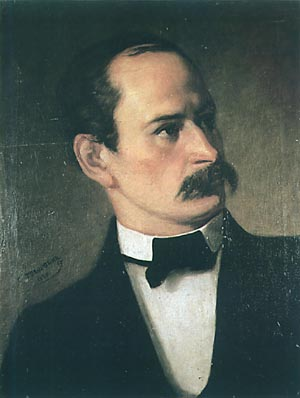
Đuro Daničić

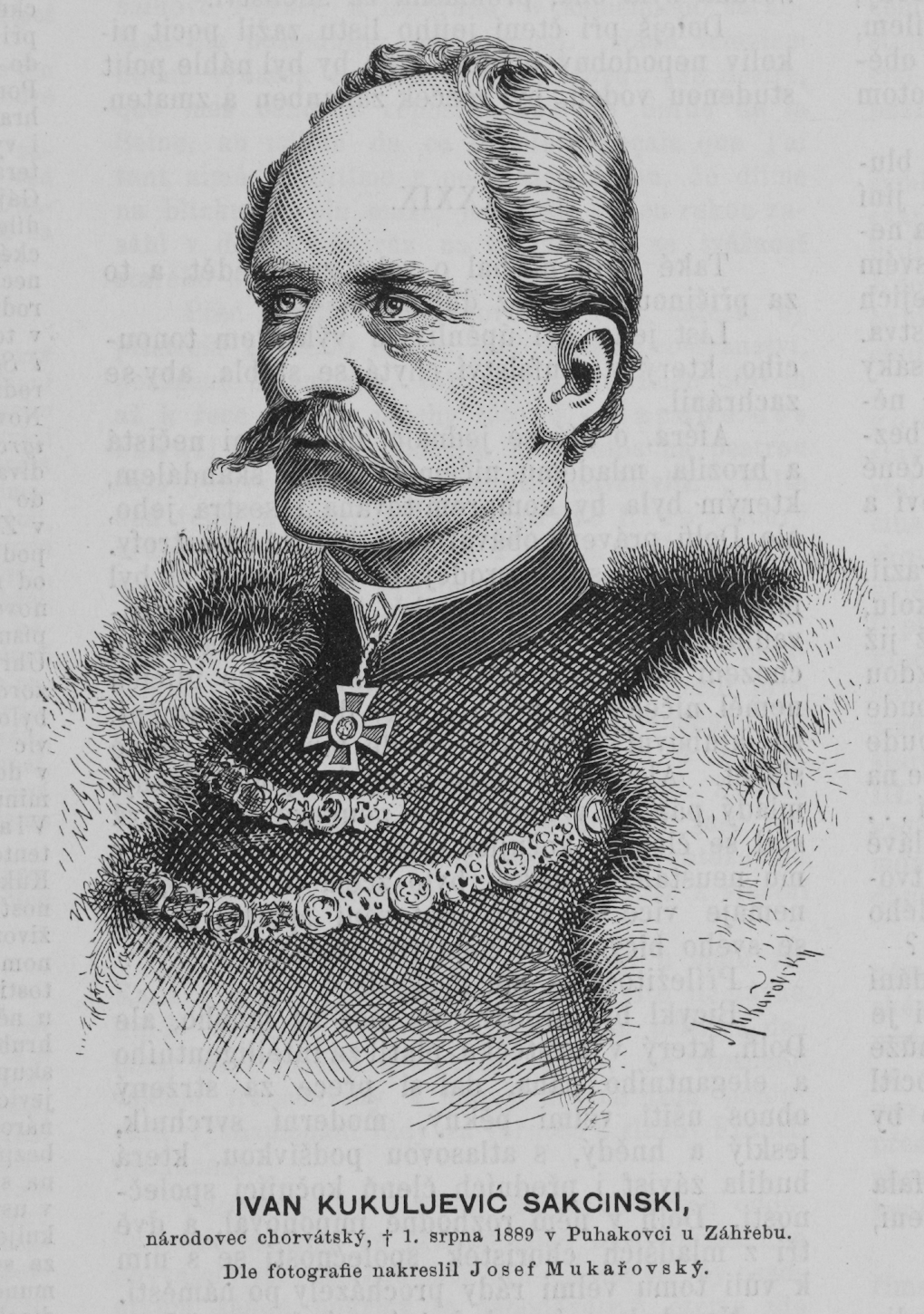
Ivan Kukuljević Sakcinski

The Vienna Literary Agreement (Serbo-Croatian: Bečki književni dogovor, Бечки књижевни договор) was the result of a meeting held in March 1850, when writers from Croatia, Serbia and Carniola (Slovenia) met to discuss the extent to which their literatures could be conjoined and united to create a standardized Serbo-Croatian language. The agreement recognized the commonality of South Slavic dialects and enumerated a basic set of grammar rules which they shared.

== Historical context ==
The first half of 19th century proved to be a turning point in Illyrian language conceptions. Around this time, Illyrians held individual debates with their opponents, and Zagreb, as the center of Croatian cultural and literary life, served as a stronghold for their implementation and propagation. However, with the years some of their adherents came to recognize the infeasibility of linguistic and literary unification of all South Slavs, realizing that the only real option left would be the creation of a common literary language for Croats and Serbs, which have in common both the Shtokavian dialect and Ijekavian accent.

== The agreement ==
In March 1850, the meeting was organized and attended by the self-taught Serbian linguist and folklorist Vuk Karadžić, his close follower Đuro Daničić; the most eminent Slavist of the period, Slovene philologist Franz Miklosich, and Croatian scholars and writers Ivan Kukuljević Sakcinski, Dimitrije Demeter, Ivan Mažuranić, Vinko Pacel, and Stjepan Pejaković.

General guidelines for the conceived development of the common literary language for Croats and Serbs were agreed on; these were in accordance with Karadžić's basic linguistic and orthographic premises, and they partly corresponded with the fundamental Croatian Neo-Shtokavian pre-Illyrian literary language which the concept of Illyrian suppressed at the expense of South-Slavic commonality. Ljudevit Gaj's Latin script and Karadžić's Cyrillic script were aligned to one-to-one congruence and both declared equal in a state of synchronic digraphia.

The signatories agreed on five points:

1. They decided not to merge existing dialects to create a new one that does not exist, but that they should, following German and Italian models, pick one of the peoples' dialects and choose this as the literary basis according to which all text would be written.
2. They unanimously accepted the selection of the "southern dialect" as the common literary language for all Serbs and Croats, and to write ije where this dialect had the disyllabic reflex of long jat, and je, e, or i where the reflex is monosyllabic (i.e. Ijekavian, Ekavian, or Ikavian). In order to ascertain precisely where the aforementioned dialect has two syllables and where only one, Vuk Karadžić was asked to write "general rules for the southern dialect" (opća pravila za južno narječje) on this issue, which he did.
3. They agreed that Serbian and Montenegrin writers should write h (/x/) everywhere it belongs etymologically, as Croatian writers do, and as some people in southern regions use in speech.
4. They all agreed that the genitive plurals of nouns and adjectives should not have h at the end because it doesn't belong there by etymology, because it is not necessary as a distinction from other cases in the paradigm, and because many writers don't write it at all.
5. It was agreed that before syllabic /r/, one should write neither a or e as some Croatian writers do, but only r, such as in the word prst ('finger'), because this is the spoken form, and the much more prevalent written form elsewhere.

During the second half of the 19th century, these conclusions were publicly called a "declaration" (objava) or "statement" (izjava). The title Vienna Literary Agreement dates from the 20th century.

== Implications and influence ==
The Vienna Literary Agreement was variously interpreted and referred to throughout the history of Croats, Slovenes, and Serbs. During the history of Yugoslavia, especially the Socialist Federal Republic of Yugoslavia, the official doctrine was that the agreement set firm grounds for the final codification of the Croatian and Serbian languages that soon followed. With the advent of national standard languages, i.e. Bosnian, Croatian and Serbian in the 1990s, criticism emerged on the relevance of the agreement.

For example, according to Malić, the event had no critical influence for the Croatian cultural milieu, but "managed to indicate developmental tendencies in the formation of the Croatian literary language which won out by the end of the century". Malić argues that it was only during the 20th century, in the framework of "unitarist language conceptions and language policy", that the meeting was given critical influence in the formation of a common Croatian and Serbian literary language.

Since the agreement was not officially organized, no one was bound by it, and thus it was not initially accepted by either the Croatian or the Serbian press. Croatia still had a very lively Illyrian conception of language, and the conservative Serbian cultural milieu was not ready to accept Karadžić's views of folk language being equal to the literary one, the Slavonic-Serbian. It was only in 1868 that his reform was accepted in Serbia, and not to a complete extent (the Ekavian accent was accepted as standard, rather than Ijekavian), and urban colloquial speech was tacitly given great influence in forming the standard language.

== See also ==
- Novi Sad Agreement
- Serbo-Croatian language
- Illyrian movement

== Bibliography ==
- Malić, Dragica (1997), "Razvoj hrvatskog književnog jezika", Hrvatska gramatika [Croatian grammar] (in Croatian), Zagreb: Školska knjiga, pp. 30–31, ISBN 953-0-40010-1
