= Novi Sad Agreement =

The Novi Sad Agreement (Serbo-Croatian: Novosadski dogovor / Новосадски договор) was a 1954 document composed by 25 Serbian, Croatian and Bosnian writers, linguists and intellectuals to build unity across the ethnic and linguistic divisions within Yugoslavia, and to create the Serbo-Croatian language standard to be used throughout the country.

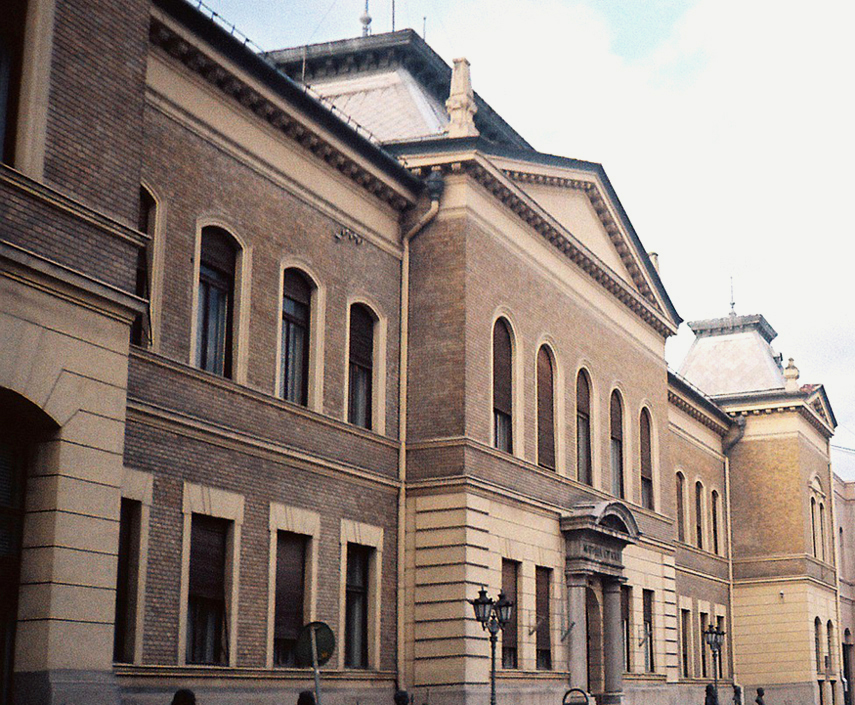
Matica srpska

Sponsored by the Serbian cultural organization's journal Letopis Matice srpske editorial board, talks on the use and acceptability of the Serbian, which uses Cyrillic and is centered on the city of Belgrade (known as the eastern variety of Serbo-Croatian) and Croatian dialect (which uses the Latin script, centered on the city of Zagreb, and is known as the western variety of Serbo-Croat) took place in the city of Novi Sad, in the Serbian province of Vojvodina. Two days of discussion, from 8 through 10 December 1954, resulted in the signing of the agreement, which laid out ten conclusions regarding the language.

The agreement focused on the similarities between the two dialects, and was primarily concerned with reconciling the different dialects for the benefit of a federalized Yugoslavia. The agreement stated that groups of linguists and intellectuals from both the eastern Serbian variant and the western Croatian variant would work together towards establishing a single dictionary and terminology.

The agreement also stated that the future language should develop naturally, although it was being forged by political will and pressure from both dialects.

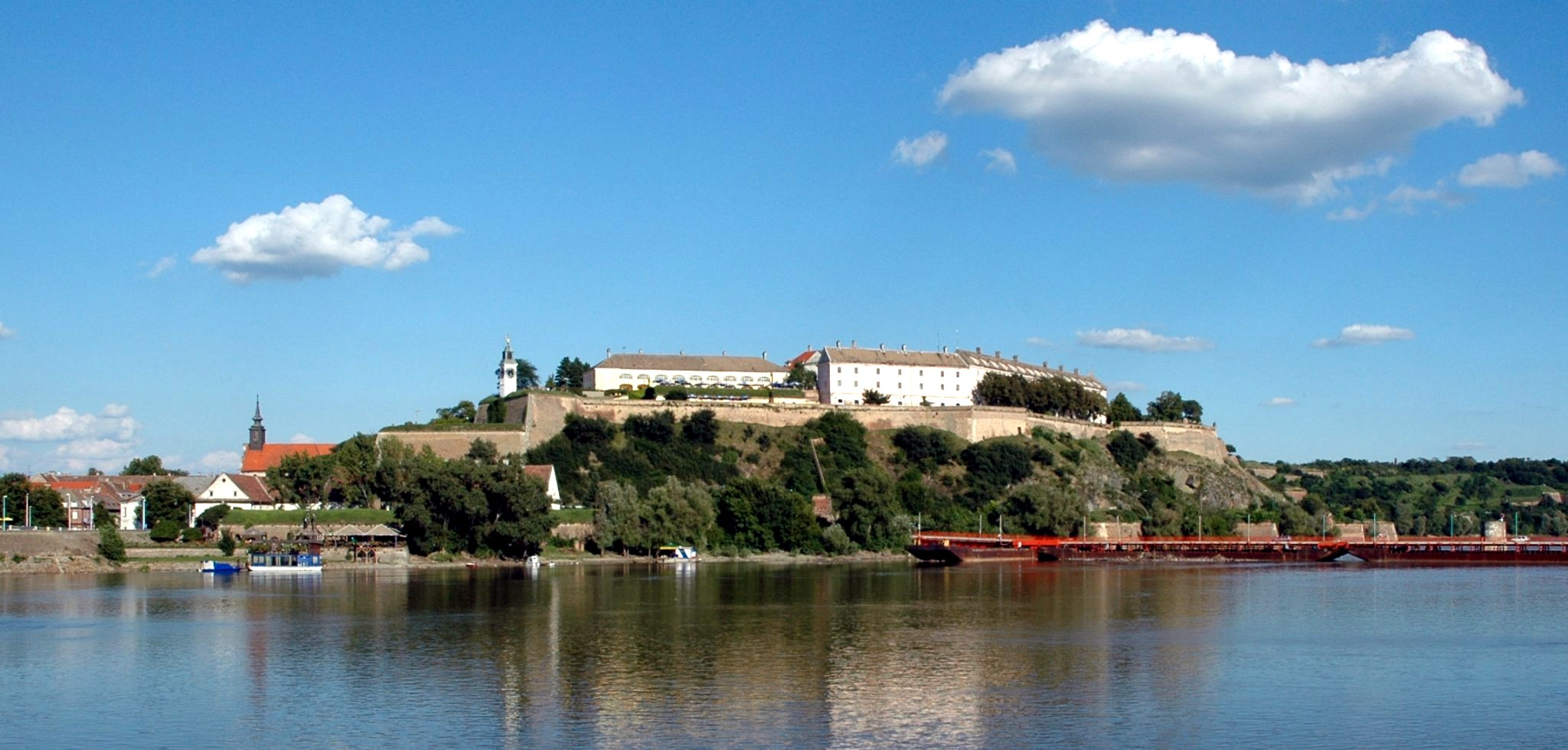
View from Novi Sad of Petrovaradin fortress over the Danube river (August 2005)

The new terminology and dictionary would have its roots in both varieties of the language, and the literary journal present at the agreement would have the same content published in both the Cyrillic and Latin script. However, many, such as Croatian intellectual Ljudevit Jonke, viewed the agreement as a veiled attempt to have Serbian become the official language of a federalized Yugoslavia, with only a passing nod given to Croatian.

As a direct result of the agreement, Matica srpska and its Croatian counterpart Matica hrvatska published an orthography manual in 1960. Although widely praised by all levels of Serbian and Yugoslav party officials and intellectuals, the orthography was roundly criticized by Croatian intellectuals, who saw the work as too Serb-centric. Their criticisms stemmed mainly from an analysis of the case of larger differences between the two dialects, claiming that the dictionary favored the eastern variant of the language over the western one.

== The text of the Novi Sad Agreement ==
The ten "conclusions", or zaključci:

1. The national language of the Serbs, Croats and Montenegrins is a single language. Therefore, the literary language that has developed around two main centers, Belgrade and Zagreb, is one language, with two pronunciations, Ijekavian and Ekavian.
2. The name of the language must make reference to its two constituent parts in official use.
3. The Latin and Cyrillic scripts are equal; therefore both Serbs and Croats are expected to learn both alphabets, which will be accomplished primarily by schooling.
4. Both pronunciations, Ekavian and Ijekavian, are also equal in all respects.
5. Matica srpska will cooperate with Matica hrvatska in the production of a new dictionary of the joint language.
6. The question of the creation of a unified terminology is also a problem that requires an immediate solution. A terminology for all spheres of economic, scholarly and cultural life needs to be created.
7. Both sides will cooperate in the compiling of a joint orthographic manual (pravopis).
8. The creation of artificial obstacles to the natural and normal development of the Croato-Serbian literary language must be decisively stopped. Harmful arbitrary "translations" of texts should be prevented and authors' original texts should be respected.
9. The Commission for the creation of an orthography and terminology will be decided by the three universities (in Belgrade, Zagreb, and Sarajevo), two academies (in Zagreb and Belgrade), and Matica srpska in Novi Sad and Matica hrvatska in Zagreb.
10. These conclusions will be made available by Matica srpska to the Federal Executive council, and the executive councils of: PR Serbia, PR Croatia, PR Bosnia and Herzegovina and PR Montenegro, and to the universities in Belgrade, Zagreb, and Sarajevo, the academies in Zagreb and Belgrade and Matica hrvatska in Zagreb, and will be published in daily newspapers and journals.

== See also ==
- Abstand and ausbau languages
- Comparison of Serbo-Croatian standard varieties
- Controversy over ethnic and linguistic identity in Montenegro
- Czechoslovak language
- Declaration on the Common Language
- Declaration on the Name and Status of the Croatian Literary Language
- Dialect continuum
- Language ideology
- Language policy
- Pluricentric language
- Political views on the Macedonian language
- Serbo-Croatian
- South Slavic languages
- Vienna Literary Agreement
