= Telecommunications in Serbia =

Telecommunication in Serbia is an important economic sector, accounting for 8.1% of country's GDP in 2023.

== Telephony ==
- Fixed-line telephones: 81% of households (2016)
- Telephone - fixed lines in use: 2.55 million, 36% penetration rate (2016)
- Telephone - mobile cellular: 9.09 million, 128% penetration rate (2016)
- International - country code: 381
- International - satellite earth station: 1 Intelsat (Atlantic Ocean)

=== Fixed telephony ===
Serbia has a developed and efficient telephone network infrastructure. Domestic line system is 100% digital, with digital cable trunk line connecting switching centres. A drop in fixed-line connections in the last decade has been more than offset by a sharp increase in mobile-cellular telephone use. Telekom Srbija, the former state monopoly, is the predominant player in landline telephony with 93.8% of market share. Since the liberalization of the telecommunications market in 2013, Telekom Srbija has been very slowly losing market share to 16 other telecom operators, of which the most significant ones include SBB and Orion Telekom.

=== Mobile telephony ===
As of December 2023 Serbia has three mobile networks, Telekom Srbija, Yettel, and A1, all of which are licensed for 2G GSM, 3G UMTS, and 4G LTE. The largest mobile operator is Telekom Srbija, marketed as mts, with 44.1% market share, followed by Yettel with 31.9% and A1 with 24% market share. In addition, SBB gained mobile virtual network operator licence in 2013 but is still not offering services.

== Radio and television ==
- Radios (2016): 75.7% of households
- Radio broadcast stations: 247 (including six national stations, 34 regional stations, and 207 local stations)
- Televisions (2016): 97.8% of households
- Television broadcast stations: 122 (including seven national stations, 26 regional stations, and 89 local stations)

=== Free-to-air terrestrial television ===
Digital television transition has been completed in 2015 with MPEG-4 compression standard and DVB-T2 standard for signal transmission.

=== Pay television ===
Some 67% of households are provided with pay television services (i.e. 38.7% cable television, 16.9% IPTV, and 10.4% satellite). There are 90 pay television operators (cable, IPTV, DTH), largest of which are SBB (mainly cable) with 48% market share, Telekom Srbija (mts TV) with 25%, followed by PoštaNet with 5%, and Ikom and Kopernikus with 4% and 3%, respectively.

== IT Industry ==
The Serbian IT industry is rapidly growing and changing pace. In 2018, IT services exports reached $1.3 billion. With 6,924 companies in the IT sector (2013 data), Belgrade is one of the information technology centres in this part of Europe, with strong growth. The Microsoft Development Center in Belgrade was, at the time of its establishment, the fifth such centre in the world. Many worlds IT companies choose Belgrade as regional or European centre such as Asus, Intel, Dell, Huawei, NCR, Ubisoft etc. These companies have taken advantage of Serbia's large pool of engineers and relatively low wages.

Large investments by global tech companies like Microsoft, typical of the 2000s, are being eclipsed by a growing number of domestic startups which obtain funding from domestic and international investors. What brought companies like Microsoft in the first place was a large pool of talented engineers and mathematicians. In just the first quarter of 2016, more than US$65 million has been raised by Serbian startups including $45 million for Seven Bridges (a Bioinformatics firm) and $14 million for Vast (a data analysis firm). One of the most successful startups have been Nordeus which was founded in Belgrade in 2010 and is one of Europe's fastest-growing companies in the field of computer games (the developer of Top Eleven Football Manager, a game played by over 20 million people).

== Internet ==
- Top-level domains: .rs and .срб (Cyrillic)
- Internet users: 5.8 million, 87.7% of the population (2024)
- Fixed internet access: 2.08 million households, 80% of households (2023)
  - Fixed internet access by type (2023):
    - Cable: 38.75%
    - FTTx: 30.92%
    - xDSL: 25.52%
    - Wireless: 4.25%
    - Other: 0.56%
- Internet hosts: 1.1 million (2012)
- Internet service providers (ISPs): 214 (2016)
  - Fixed internet service providers market share (2023):
    - Telekom Srbija: 55.77%
    - SBB: 28.41%
    - Yettel: 4.53%
    - Sat-Trakt: 2.64%
    - Orion telekom: 2.51%
    - Astra telekom: 1.08%
    - Jotel: 0.75%
    - Beotelnet-ISP: 0.55%
    - Krajnalić komunikacije: 0.46%
    - Orion telekom tim: 0.36%
    - Other: 2.94%

== See also ==
- Telekom Srbija
- Yettel
- A1
- Serbian Telecommunication Agency
