= Board for Standardization of the Serbian Language =

Linguistic institute for the Serbian language

The Board for Standardization of the Serbian Language (Serbian: Одбор за стандардизацију српског језика, romanized: Odbor za standardizaciju srpskog jezika) is a linguistic institute which purpose is to preserve and foster the Serbian language. It was founded in 1997 in Belgrade.

The founders of the board were:

- Serbian Academy of Sciences and Arts
- Montenegrin Academy of Sciences and Arts
- Academy of Sciences and Arts of the Republika Srpska
- Matica srpska
- Institute for the Serbian language
- Serbian Literary Guild
- Faculty of Philology of the University of Belgrade
- Faculty of Philosophy of the University of Novi Sad
- Faculty of Philosophy of the University of Niš
- Faculty of Philology and Arts of the University of Kragujevac
- Faculty of Philology of the University of Priština
- Faculty of Philosophy of the University of Banja Luka
- Faculty of Philosophy of the University of East Sarajevo
- Faculty of Philosophy of the University of Montenegro
