= Language Institute of the University of Sarajevo =

Public research center in Bosnia and Herzegovina

Institute for Language of the University of Sarajevo

Agency overview
- Formed: 1972; 54 years ago
- Preceding agency: Institute for Language and Literature in Sarajevo (1977–1991)
- Type: Public scientific institution
- Jurisdiction: Bosnia and Herzegovina
- Status: Organizational unit of the University of Sarajevo
- Headquarters: Sarajevo, Bosnia and Herzegovina; 43.859786°N 18.413489°E
- Agency executive: Jasmin Hodžić, Director
- Parent agency: University of Sarajevo
- Website: izj.unsa.ba

Language Institute of the University of Sarajevo (Bosnian: Institut za jezik) is a public scientific research institution in Bosnia and Herzegovina and an organizational unit of the University of Sarajevo. The Institute's primary activity is scientific research in the field of language. It was founded in 1972, and continued its work during the siege of Sarajevo (1992–1995).

Through four departments — for standard language, history of language, dialectology, and lexicography — the Institute conducts research, participates in normative projects, and promotes language culture. Among its publications are the scholarly journals Književni jezik and Radovi (Institute for Language), as well as the publication Dictionary of the Bosnian Language (2007).

== History ==
It was established in 1972 through the adoption of the Law on the Institute for Language (Official Gazette of SR BiH, no. 4/72). The establishment was preceded by the programmatic document Literary Language and Language Policy in Bosnia and Herzegovina (February 1971), which set the guidelines for language policy in SRBiH.

In 1977, it merged with the Institute for Literature into the joint institution Institute for Language and Literature in Sarajevo (Official Gazette of SRBiH, no. 20/77). Under that name, among other works, the collection Our Language in Practice (1979), edited by Josip Baotić, was published.

Based on the approval of the Assembly of SRBiH on 13 May 1991, the joint working organization was separated into two independent institutions: the Institute for Language and the Institute for Literature. During the period 1992–1995, the Institute continued operating under the conditions of the Siege of Sarajevo. In March 2022, the 50th anniversary was marked by the conference "Development of Bosnian Linguistics".

== Organization ==
The internal organization includes the Scientific Research Sector and the Administrative and Financial Sector. The Institute's bodies are the Director, the Council, and the Professional Collegium, together with permanent and temporary commissions.

=== Scientific Research Sector ===
The sector consists of four departments:

- Department for Standard Language
- Department for History of Language
- Department for Dialectology
- Department for Lexicography

=== Administrative and Financial Sector ===
The sector provides professional, administrative, and technical support to scientific work through:

- Service for Accounting, Planning, and Analysis
- Service for Publishing, Library, and Information
- Service for General Affairs

== Activities ==
The primary activity is scientific research in the field of language: the study of Bosnian language history, dialectology, and lexicography; the publication of normative manuals (orthography, grammar, dictionaries); organization of scientific conferences; and professional cooperation with educational and cultural institutions.

== Publishing and publications ==
The Institute publishes monographs, manuals, and two scholarly journals.

=== Bosnian Language Dictionary (2007) ===
A single-volume edition of 1313 pages; editor-in-chief Ibrahim Čedić (series "Special Editions", book 14).

=== Scholarly journals ===
==== Književni jezik ====
The journal has maintained continuity since 1972. It publishes original papers and reviews in the field of Central South Slavic languages.

==== Radovi (Institute for Language) ====
A serial publication indexed in international databases (ISSN 0352-969X).

== Directors ==
- Ibrahim Čedić (1948–2019)
- Alen Kalajdžija – linguist at the Institute; held managerial positions.
- Jasmin Hodžić
