= EUnet (Serbia) =

- Company type: LLC
- Industry: Telecommunication
- Founded: 1995
- Headquarters: Belgrade, Serbia
- Products: Broadband Internet; IPTV; VoIP; Cloud computing Web Hosting
- Owner: e& PPF Telecom Group
- Parent: Serbia Broadband
- Website: www.eunet.rs

EUnet is a Serbian internet brand, owned by United Group. The brand is used by two separate companies: EUnet DOO, which owns the brand and YUnet International DOO, where EUnet DOO is dedicated to Internet hosting and software development and YUnet to Internet connectivity services.

== History ==
ЕUnet Yugoslavia was established in 1995 as a signer of the franchise with EUnet International CS Amsterdam, then the largest Internet provider in Europe. The first international Internet link in Serbia, with 2 Mbit/s capacity, was launched in 1996, thus making ЕUnet the first commercial Internet service provider in Serbia and Montenegro.

EUnet d.o.o. was formed in 1997 as a special team responsible for the development of business software, hosting services and IT solutions. This additionally reinforced the company, which started introducing new services.

At a brand competition organised in 2007 by the international institution Superbrands, ЕUnet got the superbrand status for Serbia within the category of Digital media and Internet. EUnet was the only provider in Serbia that received such a status.

In 2015, EUnet d.o.o. was bought by The United Group (in Serbia parent company is SBB).

== Services ==
ЕUnet provides connectivity services via ADSL and dial up technologies, through a rented link of 1 Gbit/s capacity, as well as services of Internet domain registration and web hosting, renting dedicated servers and server collocation. The company's headquarters is located in Belgrade (Dorćol), whereas the central EUnet node is in New Belgrade, in Sava Centre. The connection from Sava Centre is redundant and secured with two independent lines.

In 2007, EUnet provided its services to more than 200,000 personal clients and over 15,000 business clients. EUnet hosts more than 6,500 Websites on its servers.

== See also ==
- EUnet
