= Serbian Telecommunication Agency =

Serbian Telecommunication Agency (RATEL) was founded at the end of May 2005, as one of the conditions for the implementation of Serbian telecommunication regulations prescribed by the law. However, it started operations on December 19, 2005, since there was a delay in providing the initial assets for the agency to start to work. Its role is the regulation of the local telecommunications market.

The chairman of the Managing Board is Jovan Radunovic.
