= A1 Srbija =

Serbian telecommunications company

A1 Srbija d.o.o.
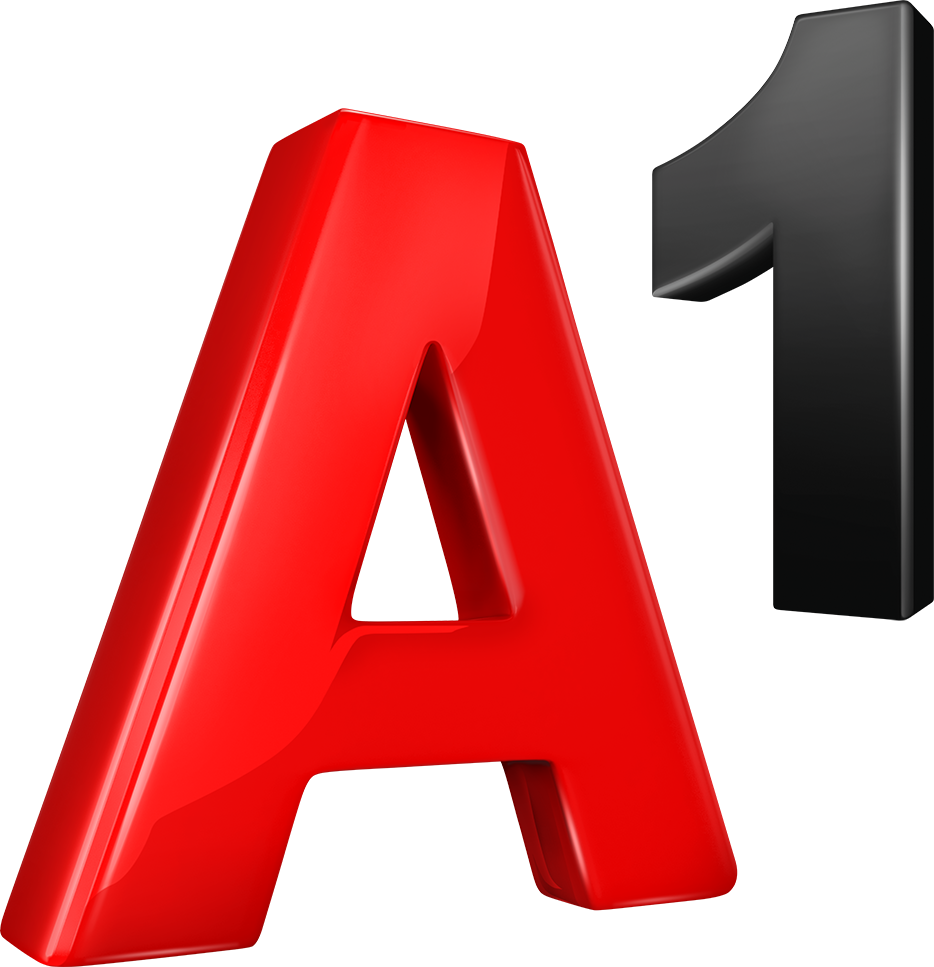
- Company type: d.o.o.
- Industry: Telecommunications
- Founded: June 11, 2007; 19 years ago
- Headquarters: Belgrade, Serbia
- Area served: Serbia
- Key people: Dejan Turk (CEO); Milan Zaletel (CFO); Đorđe Vuksanović; Nenad Zeljković
- Products: Mobile telephony
- Revenue: ▲€315.3 million (2021)
- Operating income: ▲€49.2 million(2021)
- Net income: ▲€40.3 million(2021)
- Total assets: ▲€462.5 million (2021)
- Number of employees: 1,456 (2021)
- Parent: A1 Telekom Austria Group
- Website: www.a1.rs
- Footnotes / references Business ID: 20220023; Tax ID: 104704549

A1 Srbija d.o.o. (formerly Vip mobile) is a Serbian mobile network operator owned by A1 Telekom Austria Group. As of 2020, it is the third largest mobile telephony operator with market share of 25.67%.

== History ==
On 1 December 2006, the mobilkom Austria group became the owner of the third mobile telephone license in Serbia for GSM 900/1800 and UMTS networks, through a payment of €320 million. The license was legally transferred to Vip.

Considering the great potential of the Serbian telecommunications market, the mobilkom Austria group has planned to invest up to €570 million in its first four years of operations, including the €320 million it spent on acquiring its operating license in Serbia in 2006. This makes Vip the biggest Greenfield investment in Serbia so far. In 2008, Vip became general sponsor of Serbian national volleyball team.

According to the 2015 annual financial report, company had revenue of €206.8 million, with 2.1 million customers it held a market share of 22,5%.

== Network information ==
The IMSI - Network Code of Vip is 220-05 and MSISDN Network Codes are 060 (international: +381 60), 061 (international: +381 61) and 068 (international: +381 68).

== Network technology ==
- 2G (GSM, GPRS, EDGE up to 250 kbit/s) on 900 MHz and 1800 MHz
- 3G (HSPA+ up to 42 Mbit/s) on 900 MHz and 2100 MHz
- 4G (LTE up to 225 Mbit/s) on 800 and 1800 MHz

Vip previously used national roaming with mt:s and Telenor.

License obligations for the end of 2010 require Vip to cover 80% of territory and 90% of population with its own quality signal. So far, all requirements in terms of coverage given by the license are achieved and Vip signal is available all over Serbia.

== See also ==
- Telecommunications in Serbia
