= Serbia Broadband =

Cable television and broadband internet service provider in Serbia

SBB - Serbia Broadband
- Final logo, used from 2012 to 2026.
- Native name: Српске кабловске мреже / Srpske kablovske mreže
- Type: d.o.o.
- Industry: Telecommunication
- Founded: 20 May 2002
- Defunct: 1 April 2026; 5 months ago
- Fate: Merged into Yettel Serbia
- Successor: Yettel Serbia
- Headquarters: Belgrade, Serbia
- Area served: Serbia
- Products: Cable television Broadband internet Fixed telephony
- Revenue: ▲€252.2 million (2022)
- Net income: ▲€34.88 million (2022)
- Total assets: ▲€622.38 million (2022)
- Total equity: ▲€273.85 million (2022)
- Number of employees: ▼1558 (2022)
- Website: www.sbb.rs
- Footnotes; Business ID: 17280554; Tax ID: 101038731

Serbia Broadband (branded as SBB; full legal name: Serbia Broadband - Srpske kablovske mreže d.o.o.) was a cable television and broadband internet service provider in Serbia.

Founder in 2002, SBB operated as part of the United Group from 2007 until 2025, when it became a part of e&PPF Telecom Group, which is the owner of fellow cable television and internet provider Yettel Serbia. Finally, SBB merged into Yettel Serbia in April 2026.

As of 2022, SBB was the second largest cable operator in the region, with a market share of 43%, the second largest Internet provider with a market share of 29,71%, and the second largest fixed-line telecommunication network, having a share of 21,2%.

== History ==
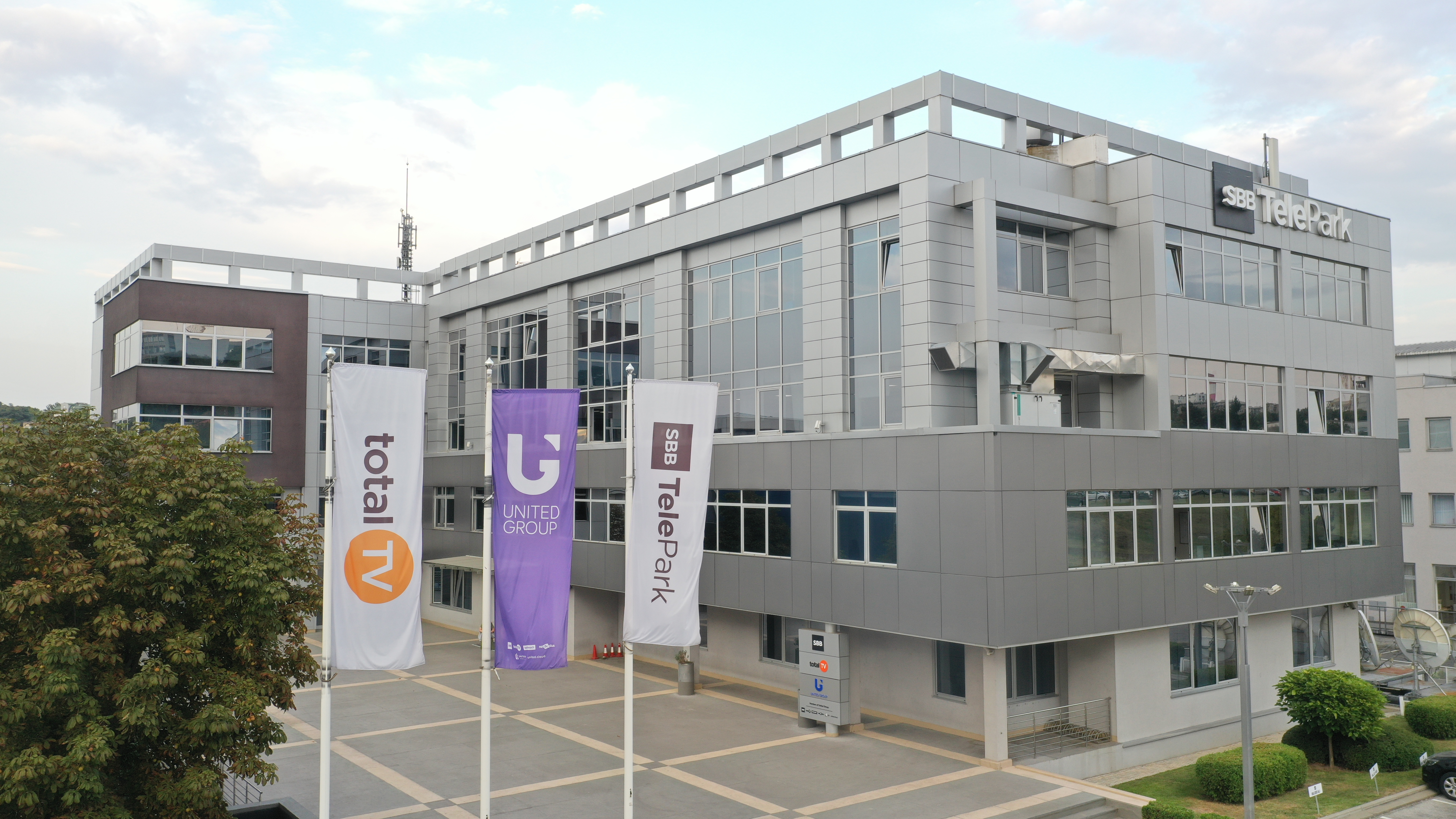
SBB company former headquarters - within Telepark kompleks

Logo used from 2002 until 2012.

The Serbia Broadband company – SBB – was formed in 2002 through the merger of KDS d.o.o Kragujevac, Telefonija Belgrade cable system, Media Plus Novi Sad, YU VOD Nis and a number of small operators.

In 2007, Serbia Broadband was acquired by Mid Europa Partners, which simultaneously purchased Telemach Slovenia followed by acquiring Telemach Bosnia and Herzegovina shortly afterwards, cable television and broadband internet providers in Slovenia and Bosnia and Herzegovina, respectively. Mid Europa then created United Group, a subsidiary to control its three new acquisitions in former Yugoslavia, with European Bank for Reconstruction and Development (EBRD) holding a minority stake in the newly created subsidiary. In the case of Serbia Broadband, the owners legally controlled it via the Amsterdam-based Adria Cable B.V.

In October 2013, an American private equity firm Kohlberg Kravis Roberts (KKR) purchased the majority stake in United Group from Mid Europa Partners for an enterprise valuation of US$1.3 billion, thus gaining control of Serbia Broadband. Once the new owners took over, they began legally controlling Serbia Broadband through the Amsterdam-based Adria Serbia Holdco B.V.

In April 2015, SBB bought Serbian internet provider EUnet for an undisclosed amount. In April 2017, SBB bought Serbian cable operator IKOM. In November 2017, SBB acquired Serbian minor cable company Kabel Group 85.

In September 2018, a British private equity firm BC Partners began the process of acquisition of the majority stakes of United Group from KKR for an enterprise valuation of 2.6 billion euros. Upon finalizing the acquisition, BC partners will officially gain ownership of Serbia Broadband.

In February 2025, United Group announced that SBB will be sold to the e&PPF Telecom Group for 825 million euros. Selling process will be finalized until the first half of the year. The e&PPF Telecom Group, owner of cable and mobile operator Yettel Serbia, is joint venture of the e& and PPF Telecom Group active in Serbia, Hungary, Bulgaria and Slovakia. On 1 April 2026, SBB was merged into Yettel Serbia, with the latter becoming its legal successor; SBB as a brand continued to exist.

== Services ==
=== Cable TV ===
When it was first launched, SBB offered cable TV services in seven cities. It doubled its market share through fast growth in 2003 and today provides television services in more than 30 cities and towns across Serbia.

SBB expanded its network and its TV channel offer to more than 220 now, including 80 in HD. That offer includes TV programming from United Media – news, sports, movies, children's TV, music, educational content among them N1, Nova S, Sport Klub, Pikaboo, Brainz and others.

The company also introduced the country's first 4K channel (Sport Klub) in October 2018. Furthermore, the operator added four multi-angle and multi-screen channels.

Development continued with the introduction of D3 services in 2007 bringing digital TV to users along with a richer offer of channels in HD with an electronic program guide.

In 2010, SBB started delivering managed services while holding a Cisco certificate.

=== Eon - TV Platform ===
SBB launched the Eon TV app on 5 September 2017.

The Eon Smart Box, the first regional solution to combine television with Android services and applications, was presented in October 2018, turning any TV into a Smart TV, followed by the Eon Smart TV app which allowed SBB users to watch TV outside the SBB network on any Internet provider in Serbia on their mobile devices, computers or Smart TV.

The Eon platform won the CSI award in the Best Mobile TV Technology or Service at the IBC 2018 global electronic media and technology conference.

=== Internet ===
Early in 2003, SBB became the first operator to offer broadband Internet to its clients.

The digitalization of Serbia was launched as part of a five-year plan with an investment worth 300 million Euro.

SBB also provides Internet access outside the homes of its clients both at home and abroad. The UNIFI app allows access to the largest WiFi network with more than 900,000 locations in the region and the UNIFI Travel app also access at more than 70 million locations across the world.

=== Fixed Telephony ===
The company was the first in Serbia to offer digital fixed telephony services in 2012 and has a market share of 20.5% (2020), ranking it second among landline service operators in Serbia.
