= Dejan Savićević =

Montenegrin footballer (born 1966)

- Дејан Савићевић
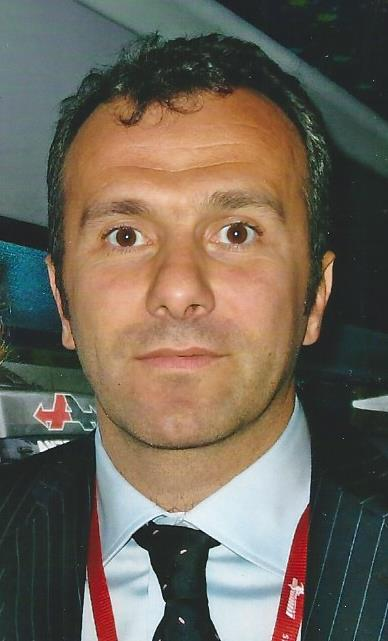
- Savićević in 2007

President of the Football Association of Montenegro (FSCG)
- Incumbent
- Assumed office 7 July 2001
- Preceded by: Office established

Personal details
- Born: 15 September 1966 (age 60) Titograd, SR Montenegro, Yugoslavia
- Party: Independent; DPS (affiliated)
- Occupation: Footballer; football coach; football administrator
Association football career
- Height: 1.78 m (5 ft 10 in)
- Positions: Attacking midfielder; winger; forward
Youth career
- 1979: Budućnost
- 1981–1983: OFK Titograd
- 1983–1984: Budućnost
Senior career*
Years	Team	Apps	(Gls)
1983–1988	Budućnost	130	(36)
1988–1992	Red Star Belgrade	72	(23)
1992–1998	Milan	97	(20)
1999	Red Star Belgrade	3	(0)
1999–2001	Rapid Wien	44	(18)
Total		346	(97)
International career
1986–1999	FR Yugoslavia (Note: Including 27 caps and 10 goals for SFR Yugoslavia.)	56	(19)
Managerial career
- 2001–2003: Serbia and Montenegro
Medal record
Representing Yugoslavia
Silver medal – second place	UEFA U-21 Euro	1990
- * Club domestic league appearances and goals

Dejan Savićević (Cyrillic: Дејан Савићевић, pronounced [dějan saʋǐːtɕeʋitɕ]; born 15 September 1966) is a Montenegrin former professional footballer who played as an attacking midfielder. Since 2001, he has been the president of the Montenegrin Football Association (FSCG), currently in his fifth term at the post.

Savićević was considered one of the best players in the world during the 1990s, and is regarded as one of the greatest Yugoslav footballers of all time. During his time in AC Milan, he was nicknamed Il Genio (The Genius) by the Italian sports press.

After beginning his professional career with hometown side Budućnost in Yugoslavia, Savićević moved to the more established Yugoslav First League club Red Star Belgrade in 1988 where he became prominent part of the team that won the 1990–91 European Cup—coming second in the 1991 Ballon d’Or voting—before making a big money transfer to Italian champions AC Milan in 1992. With Milan, he won three Serie A titles and the 1993–94 UEFA Champions League, among other trophies. He later returned to Red Star for half a season in 1999, before ending his career with Rapid Wien in 2001.

At the international level, he represented Yugoslavia at the 1990 and 1998 FIFA World Cups and, after retiring from playing, coached the Serbia and Montenegro national team from 2001 until 2003.

Following a professional playing career of 18 seasons, and a short unsuccessful head coaching stint during the early 2000's, Savićević became the president of the Montenegrin Football Association during the Summer of 2001.

== Early life ==
Born to father Vladimir Savićević, an employee of the state-owned Titograd railway transport company, and mother Vojislava "Vojka" Đurović, an administrative clerk in the same company, Dejan grew up with a younger brother Goran in the family's apartment located in Titograd's Drač neighbourhood near the Titograd railway station.

From early adolescence, he took up street football as an activity with neighbourhood friends—playing on outdoor surfaces in the vicinity of his apartment building, mostly on a nearby field called Đečevića Livada.

=== Futsal and youth football ===
Savićević's first attempt at playing structured association football took place at age 13 in the fall of 1979 within Budućnost's youth system under coach Dragan Šaković. Barely a teenager, Savićević arrived there on recommendation from lower league FK Grafičar Titograd goalkeeper Čedo Šaković, cousin of Budućnost's youth coach. However, only three months into young Savićević's participation at Budućnost, coach Šaković was transferred to the club's first team coaching staff and his successor at the youth coach position decided not to include Savićević in the squad being taken to a youth tournament in Borovo. Disappointed about being cut, young Savićević quit the team altogether and went back to playing street football.

His street football activity would soon take on a slightly more serious note with participation at outdoor concrete and clay surface futsal tournaments. Due to the popularity of this five-a-side "scaled-down football" in Titograd at the time (known as "mali fudbal" throughout the Balkans), many tournaments of semi-formal character were being organized in and around town, giving the youngster plenty of opportunities to showcase his skills. Savićević played for an informal futsal team—consisting of men from his street—named Tehnohemija after the entire block of apartment buildings in the neighbourhood where they lived. More than able to hold his own with and against men considerably older than him, the youngster quickly marked himself out as a skilled street baller with great ball control and good overall technical ability. During this time, Savićević often played with or against a neighbourhood friend three years his senior, Željko Gašić, who would go on to become widely recognized as the best futsal player in Montenegro and among the best in SFR Yugoslavia.

In the summer of 1981, following a two-year period (1979–1981) during which he only played street football and futsal, teenager Savićević's involvement with structured association football began in earnest in the youth teams of OFK Titograd under youth team coach Vaso Ivanović. Almost fifteen years of age at the time of joining OFK Titograd—considered fairly late to be starting out by professional football standards—Savićević continued playing street football in parallel with OFK.

After a year and a half at OFK Titograd's youth setup, in January 1983, sixteen-year-old Savićević was attached to the club's full squad struggling near the bottom of the Yugoslav Second League East Division. Within weeks of joining the full squad, as part of the winter break training, he played at a friendly tournament in Nikšić against the SR Montenegro-based Second League competitors Sutjeska Nikšić and Lovćen as well as top-tier league club Budućnost. Knowing that the appearance against Budućnost would be a good showcase for him but already running high fever following his appearance against Sutjeska in wintry conditions at the first match in the friendly tournament, teenage Savićević so desperately wanted to play that he kept silent about his health to his OFK Titograd coach. Despite lasting only a half against Budućnost, Savićević still did enough to get Budućnost head coach Milutin Folić's attention. And although Savićević's ailment soon progressed into full-blown pneumonia, by February 1983, the teenager got his wish of transferring across town to the more established Budućnost without appearing in any competitive matches for OFK Titograd's full squad.

== Club career ==
=== Budućnost ===
Teenage Savićević played at Budućnost's youth setup from January 1983 until summer 1984, a period during which he recorded nine league appearances (most of them substitute) for the full squad as well. The club signed him to a 4-year stipend-based agreement, which was not a professional contract. Furthermore, throughout this period, he had been receiving regular call-ups to the Yugoslavia national under-20 football team as well as SR Montenegro youth select team (alongside future notable professionals such as Božidar Bandović and Refik Šabanadžović) that competed at annual tournaments against other Yugoslav republics' select squads.

On 5 October 1983, week 10 of the league season, due to an injury incurred by the starting forward Željko Janović, head coach Folić gave the seventeen-year-old Savićević his first full-squad starting appearance at home versus Red Star Belgrade and the youngster ended up scoring on an 81st minute put-back that he chased down ahead of Red Star's defender Zoran Banković and its goalkeeper Tomislav Ivković. Savićević's first-ever top-flight goal ended up being the winning one as Budućnost recorded a famous 1-0 league victory over the heavily favoured Belgrade visitors.

==== 1984–85 season: regular playing time ====
In the summer of 1984, in preparation for the upcoming 1984–85 league season, newly arrived head coach Josip Duvančić made seventeen-year-old Savićević a full squad member at the expense of the thirty-two-year-old club legend Ante Miročević who was essentially incentivized to retire by being given a position on the club's coaching staff.

With a new coach, in addition to two established player acquisitions—goalkeeper Rade Zalad from Partizan and striker Radomir Savić who arrived from Spartak Subotica having previously gained big-match experience at Red Star Belgrade and FK Sarajevo—expectations were raised. After two consecutive seasons of finishing barely above the relegation zone, now with a squad featuring long-time club regulars Duško Vlaisavljević, forward Žarko Vukčević, Muhamed Koljenović, Rade Vešović, defender Zoran Vorotović, striker Željko Janović, midfielder Dragoljub Brnović, and defender Slavko Vlahović, the club was hoping for a top half of the table league performance. However, the season quickly turned into yet another disaster as Budućnost barely avoided relegation again with Duvančić sacked only six months into the league campaign. For Savićević personally, the campaign marked a bit of a breakthrough as he recorded 29 league appearances, scoring six goals and clearly establishing himself as the club's best young asset.

==== 1985–86 season: professional contract ====
I didn't take Džajić's advice [to reject Budućnost's professional contract offer]. Mostly out of concern that had I rejected them [and continued on as a stipend player], they probably would've purposely undermined me as revenge [for just waiting out my stipend agreement in Titograd before I could move to Red Star]. You know, things like leaving me on the bench, which would lead to a loss of form and then eventually even Red Star wouldn't be interested anymore. A footballer's job is uncertain. Any number of things can end your career. Having this professional contract was at least that little bit of security.

— Savićević on his summer 1985 thought process while pushing for a professional contract.

During the summer 1985 transfer window, not content with waiting around for the Budućnost management to accommodate him financially, soon to be nineteen-year-old Savićević looked to leave the club in search of a professional contract. To that end, he went to Red Star Belgrade on his own initiative and got to the club's technical director Dragan Džajić who in turn had retired referee Konstantin Zečević look at Savićević's stipend agreement at Budućnost with a view of examining the legal basis for a possible transfer. Zečević reportedly determined that in order to transfer to Red Star at this time, despite not being under a professional contract with Budućnost, Savićević would still require Budućnost's permission, which the Titograd club was unlikely to give. Another option was for Red Star to financially compensate Budućnost in order to let the player go, however, the Belgrade club was not sufficiently interested in Savićević at this particular time to do that. As a parting bit of career advice on this occasion, Džajić reportedly counseled Savićević not to sign a professional contract with Budućnost at all and then come to Red Star two years later in 1987 on a free transfer once his stipend agreement expires.

Wanting the security of a professional contract, Savićević continued pursuing it, going straight to Nikšić the same summer and getting a verbal commitment from FK Sutjeska that seemed ready to pay a large sum to Budućnost in order to have the talented youngster. However, the move soon fell through and Savićević was back home in Titograd where Budućnost offered him a four-year professional contract, which he decided to accept thus putting his stipend agreement with the club out of effect. In addition to the YUD35-40 million monthly salary, his Budućnost contract contained a stipulation about the entire deal being void if the club fails to provide him with a two-bedroom apartment by summer 1987.

The season, Savićević's first as a professional footballer, was marked by another desperate struggle to stay up until the very last week of league fixtures. With a new head coach Srboljub Markušević and a team featuring midfielder Dragoljub Brnović, Duško Vlaisavljević, Muhamed Koljenović, defender Zoran Vorotović, Rade Vešović, striker Željko Janović, and defender Slavko Vlahović, Budućnost managed to avoid relegation again amid a huge league-wide match-fixing scandal that erupted in Yugoslavia. For Savićević personally, despite good numbers, team-leading 10 goals in 32 league matches, the season was one of stagnation and antagonism as he butted heads with the club's management and head coach Markušević on a regular basis, even losing his starting spot and getting suspended over a row with teammate Vorotović towards the end of the league campaign.

==== 1986–87 season: renaissance under Živadinović, national team debut ====
Ahead of the 1986–87 season, head coach Milan Živadinović took over the reins, bringing in a number of new signings such as midfielder Miladin Pešterac.

The team started their league campaign off exceptionally well, continually keeping pace with teams at the top of the table. Among the notable results Budućnost posted during this great run was getting a 1–1 draw versus Partizan away at JNA Stadium in mid August 1986, beating Red Star Belgrade 1–2 away at their Marakana ground in mid October 1986, as well as winning over Hajduk Split by the same score away at their Poljud Stadium in late November 1986. As the league winter break commenced in mid December 1986, the Titograd club was in fourth place—behind Vardar, Partizan, and Velež.

You know, the way I see it, Milko Đurovski is the best player in Yugoslavia right now, but what good is that if he doesn't have a platform to show it to the world. Last season he didn't even play half of Red Star's league matches and then in the summer he transferred to Partizan thereby giving up a chance to play European competition. Season after season, he's not being showcased. D'you know what I mean, what good is it if he's the best? On the other hand, players that are a lot more modest in talent and ability compared to him like Marko Elsner and Milan Janković are constantly on the big stage either through the national team or Red Star's European Cup matches. So what's better I wonder? To be a talent and the best player no one sees or to be prudent and make sure I always play on the right stage even if I'm not the best. I read somewhere that Velibor Vasović is the most successful Yugoslav footballer of all time in terms of the silverware he's won. Not Šekularac, not Džajić, not Bobek—but Vasović. I'm a practical pragmatist and I'd prefer to have Vasović's fate over Šekularac's fate. This is why I'm still pondering my next move.

— Savićević in February 1987 on how he envisions his football career after Budućnost.

Talented Savićević had truly came into his own over those four months, becoming the team's focal point. The success led to increased attention, resulting in the skilled midfielder getting his first cap for the national side in October 1986 against Turkey in a Euro 1988 qualifier. Two months later, in late December 1986 during the league winter break, he was voted the league's "breakthrough player of the season". He furthermore placed high in Tempo magazine's 1986 Yugoslav Player of the Year poll—with the top prize going to Red Star's sweeper Marko Elsner while Velež's Semir Tuce, Savićević, and Željezničar's Haris Škoro placed just behind.

Discovering the young player's outspoken nature, as well as absence of qualms about openly discussing details of his personal life and professional career, Yugoslav print media began giving colourful Savićević a lot of attention, with numerous print interviews and electronic media appearances, with space not just in sports outlets, but lifestyle ones as well. With his future career plans dominating the conversations, young Savićević talked about wanting to avoid various pitfalls that had befallen some of the exceptionally talented young Yugoslav footballers before him such as Miralem Zjajo and Božidar Bandović, who had joined bigger Yugoslav clubs from their small local clubs early into their respective personal footballing development, only to then end up in an administrative scandal (Zjajo) or an undesirable footballing destination such as indoor football in the United States (Bandović). Savićević thus underscored his desire not to leave Titograd just for the sake of leaving without a clear plan for what happens after he joins the bigger club, mentioning Titograd and Yugoslavia as his "natural setting" before considering transferring abroad.

In the second half of the domestic league campaign, Budućnost quickly ran out of steam: with the league restarting on 22 February 1987, plavo-bijeli only managed a 1–1 draw away at bottom-placed Dinamo Vinkovci before drawing 1-1 at home versus Partizan the following week and then losing 2-0 away at another bottom-feeder Spartak Subotica the week after that. Losing 0-1 at home to yet another bottom-of-the-table team Sloboda Tuzla in mid March 1987 indicated the full scale of the team's post winter break malaise. Although the results somewhat improved after that with a home win versus Čelik Zenica, away draw at Rijeka and home win versus Dinamo Zagreb, Budućnost was back to losing winnable matches by mid April 1987, falling to Željezničar away and FK Priština away within a two-week span. The latter loss launched the team on yet another losing streak with losses to Red Star Belgrade at home and local rival Sutjeska Nikšić away. Eventually, the Titograd club finished the league season in 7th spot thus missing out on Europe.

Similarly, in the Marshal Tito Cup, after initially eliminating the 4th-tier Neretva Metković followed by overcoming the First League rivals Velež Mostar in a hard-fought two-legged tie (4-3 on aggregate) in the round of 16, and finally beating Radnički Kragujevac in the quarterfinals, each win coming throughout the fall of 1986, Budućnost eagerly awaited its semifinal clash versus Rijeka set for March and April 1987. Coinciding with the team's general loss of form following the league restart post winter break, Budućnost lost the opening leg 2-1 away in Rijeka before only managing a 1-1 draw at home three weeks later and getting eliminated from the competition, 3-2 on aggregate.

Despite Budućnost's season ending without a trophy, Savićević continued to develop as a playmaker and goalscorer, and speculation grew that he would move to another club.

==== 1987–88 season: weighing offers from big Yugoslav clubs ====
By the 1987–88 season, bigger Yugoslav teams—primarily Red Star Belgrade and Partizan—began expressing strong interest in the Montenegrin's services. The twenty-one-year-old became the most sought-after young asset in Yugoslav football resulting in his entire league season at Budućnost being marked by the chase for his signature. Though the player had often had issues with Budućnost's club management in the past, often openly stating so in Yugoslav sports media, this relationship further deteriorated when one of the main stipulations of his professional contract with the club—that of being given a two-bedroom apartment by summer 1987—was not met within the agreed-upon timeframe. Already talking to Red Star's Montenegro-born scout Nastadin Begović who had family in the Titograd area and often checked in on the young player whenever in town, Savićević wanted out of Budućnost and, via his media statements, began putting pressure on the club to sell him immediately.

Under new head coach Špaco Poklepović, the Budućnost roster went through some notable changes. Though forward Željko Janović was still the number one option up front, talented youth system prospects Predrag Mijatović and Anto Drobnjak were attached to the first team and immediately began getting regular opportunities at forward spots. Despite putting in another confident season under head coach Poklepović that would see Savićević score 10 league goals from 29 appearances, the player simultaneously butted heads with the Budućnost management, at one point, during the winter break, even resorting to refusal to travel to the mid-season training camp with the rest of the team.

Meanwhile, regarding Savićević's imminent transfer out of the club, Budućnost were reportedly more inclined on selling their prized asset to Partizan, with the player even travelling to Belgrade, accompanied by his father, for a meeting at the FK Partizan executive board president and JNA general Zdravko Lončar's apartment where Lončar presented them Partizan's offer. Also present at the meeting were club's representatives: general secretary Žarko Zečević, technical director Nenad Bjeković, and ex player Gajica Đurović. However, by January 1988, following a meeting in Budva between Budućnost's club management and Red Star's representatives—managing board member Miloš Slijepčević, scout Nastadin Begović, football director Dragan Džajić, and general secretary Vladimir Cvetković—the sought-after player suddenly seemed closer to going to Red Star. Savićević stated in later interviews that the personal relationship he had developed with Begović, and eventually Slijepčević, as well as Red Star's offer being "direct and financially more concrete than Partizan's" ultimately swung his decision where to continue his footballing career.

In late March 1988, Hajduk Split also joined the chase for Savićević's signature and, according to the player's claims in later interviews, offered the largest sum of money of the three suitors, but he still decided to honour his preliminary agreement with Red Star. It was precisely against Hajduk—a team finishing up a disastrous league season—that Savićević played one of his last matches in the Budućnost shirt, scoring twice away at Poljud on 15 May 1988 for a memorable 1-2 come-from-behind win.

=== Red Star Belgrade ===
On 20 June 1988, the first day of the summer transfer window, Savićević signed with the Yugoslav league champions Red Star Belgrade. Also signing with Red Star on the same day was striker Darko Pančev from Vardar Skopje. The midfielder and striker duo joined the squad led by twenty-three-year-old Dragan Stojković. The club additionally had nineteen-year-old midfielder Robert Prosinečki.

==== 1988–89 season: in the army and the sporting company ====
Barely a few days after signing with Red Star Belgrade, twenty-one-year-old Savićević promptly was called in to serve the mandatory Yugoslav People's Army (JNA) stint that would keep him out of action for the entire 1988–89 league season. The other new high-profile acquisition Pančev also got called up to the army right after signing. Many, including Savićević himself who stated so directly, speculated that the timing of the call-ups was FK Partizan's (Yugoslav army club with many ties to top military authorities) revenge on both players for signing with their biggest rivals. Right after reporting to the military, Savićević was transferred to the barracks in Skopje with an agreement that he'll be allowed to turn up for Red Star's European ties and national team matches.

JNA soldier Savićević, still stationed in the city of Skopje, was approved a leave to make his competitive debut for Red Star during early October 1988 in the return leg of the European Cup first-round clash versus Irish champions Dundalk. With the tie already decided with Red Star carrying a 5-goal first-leg advantage, Savicevic had a first training session after 4 months without any football activity and promptly had a severe muscle inflammation. At the return leg match itself, with Red Star leading 1–0 at the half, out-of-competitive-shape Savićević was sent on by head coach Branko Stanković as a second-half substitute for Robert Prosinečki. The Montenegrin ended up scoring his first goal in the new uniform as Red Star once again routed the Irish team, 3–0. Seeing that Savićević was completely out of competitive shape with the next round tie versus Milan coming up in a few weeks, in order to help him maintain his fitness and conditioning, Red Star dispatched their trainer and youth team coach Vojkan Melić to Skopje in order to work with the player individually for two weeks by putting him through a daily training regimen.

A few weeks later, soldier Savićević was approved another leave ahead of what would turn into an epic second-round tie against AC Milan played over three matches in late October and early November 1988. Surprising many, coach Stanković decided to play Savićević in the starting lineup in the first leg at San Siro—handing him an important role upfront instead of the player's customary position on the left wing that instead went to Miloš Bursać—as Red Star played to a hard-fought 1–1 draw with Dragan Stojković scoring the valuable away goal. Considering Savićević's lack of match fitness and striker Mitar Mrkela's good run of form, even Savićević himself expressed "surprise, even shock" at getting the start as a forward, stating that had he known of the coach's plans in advance he probably would have advised him against it. Two weeks after that, the return leg in Belgrade was even more eventful. Now better prepared fitness-wise, Savićević—who again got the start at forward ahead of Mrkela despite Mrkela scoring a brace three days earlier in a league derby win versus Dinamo Zagreb—had his team up 1–0 with an excellent 50th minute strike. However, seven minutes later in the 57th minute, the German referee Dieter Pauly stopped and voided the match because of thick fog that had engulfed the city. The second leg replay was played the very next day, resulting in a 1–1 scoreline again, taking the match to penalties where the Italians came up on top 2–4 as Savićević and Mrkela (who had entered the contest off the bench) failed to convert their spot-kicks.

In the meantime, Yugoslav FA president Miljan Miljanić was successful in his lobbying efforts with the JNA chief of staff Veljko Kadijević to form the so-called "sporting company" (sportska četa) within a Belgrade-based First Army battalion thereby allowing young professional footballers to serve their army stint together while also providing them with the conditions to continue with their sporting regiment. After five months of serving in SR Macedonia, in late fall 1988, Savićević thus got transferred back to the nearby Topčider barracks in Belgrade. Other recruits in the sporting company were fellow professional footballers: Savićević's Red Star teammate Pančev, Zvonimir Boban and Kujtim Shala from Dinamo Zagreb, Fadil Vokri, Goran Stevanović, Goran Bogdanović, Milinko Pantić, and Milko Đurovski from Partizan, Aljoša Asanović, Ante Miše, Dragi Setinov, Stjepan Andrijašević, and Dragutin Čelić from Hajduk Split, goalkeeper Ilica Perić from Osijek, Dragan Jakovljević from Sarajevo, Predrag Jurić from Velež, etc. Right after being established, the sporting company formed a select squad—occasionally referred to as the "Yugoslav People's Army representative team"—that was coached by Stanislav Karasi and toured the country, making appearances such as: playing friendly matches at the Republic Day tournament in Jajce in late November 1988, friendly match versus the third-tier club FK Rudo in Rudo on 22 December 1988, and Marjan tournament in Split during spring 1989.

Describing his time in the JNA's sporting company, Savićević said: "The players all served in Belgrade, which in and of itself was a perk since it meant we weren't in some godforsaken remote location. Furthermore, we only spent time in the barracks in the morning while in the afternoon we'd be at the stadium training. We were certainly privileged compared to other JNA soldiers".

Midway through the season, head coach Branko Stanković was let go and Dragoslav Šekularac was brought in as replacement. The change suited Savićević just fine as he and another key player Dragan Stojković never saw eye to eye with Stanković.

==== 1989–90 season ====
Savićević's first season in earnest with Red Star was 1989–90.

Savićević helped Red Star win three consecutive national titles – in 1989–90, 1990–91 and 1991–92, two national Cups in 1990 and 1992 as well as a European Cup and an Intercontinental Cup, both in 1991.

In 1991, following Red Star's European success, Savićević came joint second in the voting for the European Footballer of the Year (Ballon d'Or). In the Sport daily newspaper's choice, he was declared the best Yugoslav athlete.

=== AC Milan ===
Savićević's tremendous close control and vision convinced Serie A champions AC Milan to secure his services for the reported ITL10 billion or DM30 million (≈ £9.4 million) ahead of the 1992–93 season as part of the £34 million worth of transfer fees club owner Silvio Berlusconi injected into the team that summer. The player had reportedly been on the club's radar for more than a season, with Milan's sporting director Ariedo Braida coming to Belgrade in April 1991 to personally assess him at the European Cup semi-final return leg versus Bayern. Furthermore, sports agent Predrag Naletilić was the main operational liaison involved in the transfer. Also arriving to an already star-laden squad during the same transfer window were the world-class players Jean-Pierre Papin (world record signing for £10 million if only for a few weeks until Juve bought Gianluca Vialli from Sampdoria for £12 million), Zvonimir Boban, Gianluigi Lentini (another Berlusconi's world record signing for £13 million) and Stefano Eranio.

==== 1992–93 season: struggling for playing time under Capello ====
Savićević was thus handed the opportunity to demonstrate his abilities in the financial centre of European club football at the time—the league where the world's best footballers played. His competitive debut in AC Milan shirt saw him score twice in a 4-0 Coppa Italia rout at home versus lowly Serie B side Ternana. A week later, he added another goal in the return leg against the same opponent. His Serie A debut took place on 13 September 1992, week 2 of the season, away at Pescara, two days before his 26th birthday as Milan won 4–5 at Stadio Adriatico.

However, Savićević's first season for the Rossoneri under head coach Fabio Capello would turn out to be a rather modest affair, with only ten league appearances, contributing four goals to Milan's successful title defence. As Savićević was seen to be Berlusconi's rather than Capello's signing, the head coach overlooked him during the majority of the first half of the season. The all-star Milan squad already had a creative attacking presence in the highly influential Marco van Basten who, when healthy, was the preferred option by Capello throughout most of the season. Similarly, thirty-year-old Ruud Gullit, increasingly a peripheral figure under Capello, was still chosen ahead of Savićević in the pecking order most of the time. Due to UEFA enforcing the three foreigners rule at the time, Savićević often found himself omitted from the squad on matchdays as, in addition to Gullit and Van Basten, the Milan roster also featured several other high quality foreigners in midfield and attack, such as Frank Rijkaard, Papin and Boban. Additionally, Capello often preferred hard-working midfielders such as Demetrio Albertini and Stefano Eranio for his tactical setup over the high-priced creative imports. Not taken with the Montenegrin's superior technical abilities, though recognizing his talents, Capello's assessment of Savićević was that he played "a Yugoslav style—he was the star and the others had to run for him".

Furthermore, from the start of the Champions League competition in September 1992, Savićević was completely omitted from the squads selected for the European matches. Savićević and Capello quickly developed an antagonistic relationship with the former frustrated at being regularly dropped from the first team, and the latter unwilling to change the winning formula that had the team on an undefeated run in the league dating back to May 1991 (the streak would eventually end after 58 matches in March 1993 versus Parma). In November 1992, when asked how he copes with leaving out world class players such as Savićević or Papin, Capello responded:

It's very difficult for all these great players. At most clubs, there's a squad of 15 or 16. Here we have 24. They have to change their mentality just like I've had to change mine. This is a different way of doing the job. It means they have to be prepared to work hard even when they aren't in the team. Work, work, work. That's the only way. It's not easy for them.

By December 1992, Savićević was so unhappy with his status at the club that he made a firm decision to leave during the winter transfer window as he had offers from Marseille and Atlético Madrid that ended up falling through and the player staying put.

It was not until 24 January 1993 that Savićević scored his first league goal for Milan—a 78th-minute penalty kick effort at home versus Genoa that turned out to be the game-winner. Finally opening his scoring account encouraged Savićević somewhat, and two weeks later he got another one versus lowly Pescara. His shining moment in the otherwise forgettable debut league season in Italy came on 7 March 1993 at home versus Fiorentina when he scored a second-half brace for a 2–0 Milan win.

In mid-March 1993, Savićević finally made his European debut for Milan, entering the Champions League group stage match versus Porto as a 77th-minute substitute for Marco Simone. Three weeks later, in early April 1993, he got the full ninety minutes away at IFK Göteborg followed by another full ninety minutes two weeks after that at home versus PSV Eindhoven. To cap off the frustrating season, in late May 1993, Savićević was not included in the team Capello took to Munich to face Olympique de Marseille in the 1993 UEFA Champions League Final as the three foreigners chosen were van Basten, Rijkaard, and Papin.

At the end of the campaign, following his less-than-mediocre season, Savićević's fate at the club was being decided among Milan brass. Capello wanted him out while Berlusconi was adamant about the player staying and getting more opportunities to play.

==== 1993–94 season: continued rowing with Capello and 1994 Champions League Final ====
The summer 1993 off-season brought some player personnel changes that would end up benefiting Savićević. His main two attacking midfield competitors Gullit and Van Basten were gone; the former transferring to Sampdoria frustrated at seeing his role at Milan greatly reduced and the latter taking a year off to heal his ankle injury that would eventually turn out to be career-ending. Also, Frank Rijkaard transferred back to Ajax, which freed up even more room. New foreign summer arrivals Brian Laudrup and Florin Răducioiu would find little playing time in Capello's structure, all of which made the competition for three foreign spots easier for the remaining foreigners Savićević, Boban and Papin during the first part of the season.

The competitive season began on 21 August 1993 in Washington, D.C. in front of the half-empty RFK Stadium where Milan beat Torino 1–0 to win the Supercoppa Italiana with Savićević getting a start before being subbed off for Roberto Donadoni after 60 minutes.

A week later at the beginning of the new league campaign, it looked like Savićević would be getting more first-team opportunities as he started the league season opener away at Lecce before again making way for Donadoni fifteen minutes into the second half. However, it turned out to be a false dawn as Savićević didn't get a minute of action in the following five league matches as Capello preferred Donadoni. During that time, frustrated Savićević initiated another run-in with the head coach, deepening their simmering row. The Montenegrin gave an interview to the Italian papers, openly blasting Capello over the way he's running the team, and specifically about the lack of playing time he's been given by the coach. Decades later, in March 2013, Savićević talked about the incident:

I gave it to Capello real good in the papers and not too long after that, Boban came over during training telling me Capello wants to talk. I went over to talk, bringing Boban along as a translator since I didn't yet speak Italian all that well. Capello first wanted to know if everything that appeared in the papers was genuine. And after I confirmed it was, he was like 'How could you say things like that' to which my response was 'well, I could'. He then started lecturing me about this and that and how I can't be saying such things and I just told Boban to tell Capello that I said Capello can go fuck himself. Then Boban told me he won't translate that, and I just finally had it with the whole thing, saying 'fuck him' to Boban and walking away in the middle of Capello's little lecture.

It wouldn't be until week 7 in early October 1993 that Savićević reappeared with a home start and full ninety minutes versus Lazio. Although still not a regular, he finally began to establish himself in the club with confident displays when given a chance though Capello still wasn't convinced enough to play the Montenegrin in bigger matches, notably dropping him from the squad versus fellow title contenders Juventus in week 9 and city rivals Inter in week 11.

The player's tense relations with Capello soon inflamed again. First, as the Champions League group phase began in late November 1993, Capello named Savićević to the reserves for the opening match away at Anderlecht, which the player protested by refusing to travel to Brussels with the team. Then, in mid-December 1993, the row deepened when Capello dropped him from the squad altogether for the 1993 Intercontinental Cup in Tokyo versus Telê Santana's São Paulo, choosing Papin, freshly arrived Marcel Desailly, and Răducioiu as the three matchday foreigners. The omission sparked another round of antagonism between the player and the head coach through the Italian press. Years later, Capello admitted in hindsight that Savićević's big match quality probably would've swung the match in Milan's favour but that, at the time, he wanted to stick with Răducioiu in the lineup since the Romanian was among the group of players Capello had been preparing the Cup final with in the days leading up to the contest.

The playing setup Capello employed throughout this season was an extremely defensive 4–4–2 that resulted in the entire squad scoring only 36 goals in 34 league matches while letting in only 15, as they won their third consecutive Serie A title. Further solidifying the defensive focus was the November 1993 arrival of Desailly who became a regular right away. Still, for the Montenegrin's inspirational and creative play, Milan-based journalist Germano Bovolenta of La Gazzetta dello Sport hailed Savićević as Il Genio (The Genius), a nickname that initially drew snickers and even occasional ridicule from other Italian journalists—especially those writing for the Turin-based Tuttosport and Rome-based Corriere dello Sport—but would eventually gain wider acceptance in the country after Savićević's performance in the 1994 Champions League Final. For the time being, as of late 1993, his footballing talents had continually been admired by club president Berlusconi whom Savićević developed great rapport with, as it was basically Berlusconi's personal support that kept Savićević from leaving the club during various low points of the player's relationship with Capello.

Still, the season would end on a high note for Savićević. His performance in the 1994 UEFA Champions League Final at Athens' Olympic Stadium on 18 May was remarkable, scoring one goal and distracting his opponents in a 4-0 victory against Barcelona. He had displayed improved form and confidence in the second part of the Champions League season, scoring twice during March 1994 right after the winter break in consecutive home-and-away matches versus Werder Bremen. Still, despite finishing top of the group and winning the one-match semifinal, Milan was in disarray heading into the final as both central defenders Franco Baresi and Alessandro Costacurta, the core of Capello's tactical defensive setup, were suspended. Considering that the opponent was the high-flying Barcelona "dream team" which consisted of Romário, Hristo Stoichkov, Ronald Koeman, José Mari Bakero, Pep Guardiola, among others, Capello made a decision to fight fire with fire by sending out an offense-minded formation. With this changed approach, Savićević created the opening goal for Daniele Massaro and then scored a 35-yard half volley for 3–0 to put the game beyond Barcelona's reach.

==== 1994–95 season ====
As a result of his much publicized Champions League final outstanding performance, Savićević's stock at Milan was raised to the point of club chairman and CEO Adriano Galliani contacting him during the summer 1994 offseason to seek input regarding the club's intent of acquiring David Ginola from Paris Saint-Germain and Faustino Asprilla from Parma. Speaking to Galiani from a vacation, Savićević was reportedly vehemently against both proposed moves due to increasing the number of squad foreigners to five or six thus limiting his playing opportunities, even telling Galliani that if Ginola and Asprilla are brought in he would not show up for training camp and would be seeking to be transferred out of the club.

Though neither Ginola nor Asprilla ended up being acquired, the following 1994–95 season at Milan began much the same way for Savićević since Capello returned to his usual manner of running the team with tactics and defence dominating over offensive creativity, meaning the player was still forced to endure occasional omissions on match days (though the competition for foreign spots became easier with only returnee Gullit who left again by mid-season, Boban, and Desailly as competition). On top of that, nagging injuries followed Savićević throughout the season limiting the Montenegrin's league appearances to 19 matches out of 34. However, he managed to score nine league goals (his greatest single season scoring output in Serie A), including four goals in a single match on 14 January 1995 versus Bari at Stadio San Nicola, the site of his European Cup triumph with Red Star. In the second leg of the 1994 UEFA Super Cup Final against Arsenal in Milan, he set up Daniele Massaro's goal to give Milan a 2–0 aggregate victory.

Despite the team's mid-table Serie A form in 1995, Savićević continually played well for the rossoneri in the Champions League en route to their third successive final that, for him, culminated in a spectacular semi-final versus Paris Saint-Germain, where he scored twice in the return leg at San Siro. Two weeks prior in the first leg at the Parc des Princes, Savićević set up Boban in injury time for the only goal of the match. Despite his brilliant performance against PSG and his statistical importance to the team in 1995, he was not part of the team Capello took to Vienna for the 1995 Champions League Final due to 'injury', even though Savićević insisted he was fit. In the final, a very negative and defense-minded Milan side created few opportunities and ultimately lost 1–0 to Louis van Gaal's young Ajax side.

==== 1995–96 season ====
New foreign arrivals Paulo Futre and George Weah as well as the signing of Roberto Baggio increased the competition in both midfield and attack, but 29-year-old Savićević managed to turn in a successful season with 23 league appearances and six league goals as Milan managed to recapture the league title. His brightest moments occurred in the Derby della Madonnina as he finally scored a goal versus the cross-town rivals Inter. On more than one occasion Savićević displayed his amazing technical skills and ball control such as when he dribbled and danced around Parma defenders Fernando Couto and Luigi Apolloni to set up Baggio for the opening goal against Parma at San Siro, before scoring one of his own in the eventual 3–0 win.

==== Later seasons ====
Savićević's final seasons at Milan were less successful. The 1996–97 season saw the arrival of several new players, as well as manager Óscar Tabárez; Milan started the season with a 2–1 loss in the 1996 Supercoppa Italiana to Fiorentina, with Savićević scoring Milan's only goal of the match. A series of disappointing results in the league saw Milan's former coach Arrigo Sacchi return to the club as a replacement. Milan failed to retain their league title, finishing the season in a disappointing eleventh place, while they were once again knocked out in the quarter-finals of the Coppa Italia, and also suffered a group stage elimination in the UEFA Champions League.

The following season saw Fabio Capello recalled to the Milan bench and several more arrivals. Milan once again failed to qualify for Europe, placing tenth in Serie A, although they managed to reach the final of the Coppa Italia; Savićević's final goal for Milan came in the first leg of the quarter-finals of the tournament, on 8 January 1998, a 5–0 win against cross-city rivals Inter. Savićević was released by Milan during the summer 1998 transfer window.

In his total time at the San Siro, he won seven trophies, including three scudetti (Serie A championships) – 1992–93, 1993–94, 1995–96 - one European Cup – 1993–94 - and one European Super Cup, totalling 144 appearances and 34 goals between 1992 and 1998. In spite of his skill and success with Milan, he was also criticized in the Italian media during his time with the club for his poor work rate and lack of consistency, in particular for not always running or trying against smaller teams, and his performances regularly blew hot and cold.

=== Return to Red Star ===
In January 1999, following six months away from playing competitive football, thirty-two-year-old Savićević returned to his former club Red Star Belgrade under head coach Vojin Lazarević. Coming back to Marakana, the site of his great career successes, the club was third in the league at the winter break, behind Partizan and reigning league champions FK Obilić. Featuring a solid young team core of Goran Drulić, Goran Bunjevčević and Branko Bošković, the club had just sold its best young prospect Perica Ognjenović to Real Madrid, while simultaneously bringing in Mihajlo Pjanović from OFK Beograd.

Veteran Savićević—who was immediately given the captain's armband—made his debut as the league restarted following the winter break. His most notable outing took place on 20 March 1999 against cross-town rivals Partizan where he earned the man of the match performance. Four days later NATO attacked FR Yugoslavia, forcing the league season to be interrupted and eventually ended prematurely.

In total, Savićević made three league appearances during his second stint with Red Star.

=== Rapid Wien ===
He played his final two seasons with the Austrian side Rapid Wien, before retiring in 2001, after persistent injury struggles.

== International career ==
Spanning 13 years, Savićević's national team career is divided in two distinct parts: first six years under head coach Ivica Osim for Yugoslavia national team of SFR Yugoslavia and last five years under head coach Slobodan Santrač representing FR Yugoslavia, which consisted of Serbia and Montenegro.

His years under Osim were marked by the tumultuous relationship the two men shared, with conservative Osim often distrustful of Savićević's talents, preferring players he considered to be more mature and reliable for the forward and attacking midfield positions such as Zlatko Vujović, Mehmed Baždarević, Dragan Stojković, and even veteran Safet Sušić.

Under Santrač, Savićević was an automatic regular, but due to the UN embargo imposed on FR Yugoslavia and resulting sporting sanctions, he missed two and a half years of national team football altogether. Also, since Yugoslavia did not resume playing competitive matches until mid-1996, it meant Savićević was prevented from playing any competitive national team matches from the time he was 25 until almost turning 30.

=== Euro 88 qualifying ===
Twenty-year-old Budućnost midfielder Savićević made his national team debut on 29 October 1986 in a Euro 88 qualifier versus Turkey in Split. Head coach Ivica Osim—himself only in his fourth match overall coaching the national team (and his first doing it alone as he previously shared the coaching duties with Ivan Toplak)—put the talented twenty-year-old in as a 53rd-minute substitute for Haris Škoro with Yugoslavia up 2–0 through Zlatko Vujović's first-half brace. Debutante Savićević wasted no time in making a mark, scoring the 3–0 goal in the 73rd minute before Vujović completed a hat-trick for a 4–0 final scoreline. However, despite getting a goal on his debut, Savićević's thunder was somewhat stolen by another debutante—twenty-two-year-old sub Semir Tuce whose confident midfield display on the left wing grabbed all the headlines. Two weeks later, Osim did not call up Savićević for the important qualifier away at Wembley versus England while Tuce was called up, making a second-half substitute appearance. Yugoslavia lost 0–2.

Within months, furious over lack of playing time and overall status in the national team, young Savićević began viciously criticizing Osim in the Yugoslav press, questioning the coach's expertise and even professional integrity. In a February 1987 interview for the Duga magazine, twenty-year-old FK Budućnost attacking midfielder Savićević launched a blistering broadside at the Yugoslavia head coach:

Had I been playing my club football at Željezničar, I'd be a national team regular right now. Osim doesn't appreciate my skills and even declares so publicly. Well, I'm not gonna sit here and take that—I've got no respect for him as a coach, neither on the club nor the national team level. And it's not because he's not giving me national team call-ups, but because he completely privatized the national team head coaching post. None of the Yugoslav football officials have the guts to talk about this, but I do because I've got nothing to lose. Osim is giving unjustified opportunities to Željezničar players in the national team at the expense of the more deserving players from other clubs. And in that process, he's not only causing damage to those omitted players' careers but even more so to the national team itself. At the 10-day training camp in Topolšica ahead of the Turkey qualifier, Osim's favourite player Haris Škoro didn't even train once; he was constantly rehabbing his injury. But then he got the starting assignment against Turkey. Not only him but Radmilo Mihajlović, another Željo player, too. Then, once the team started playing badly, not result-wise obviously, but the overall play, Osim decided to take both Škoro and Mihajlović off with Yugoslavia up 2-0, a move that implied their supposed injuries thereby giving them a reprieve for both having poor outings. And afterwards, I'm the one who gets criticized even after scoring a goal after being on the pitch for 20 minutes. Osim also left Štef Deverić on for the entire match despite him having such a horrible performance that even his own father would have subbed him at the half. Osim did that, of course, because the match was being played in Split in front of Deverić's club fans..... And then finally the whole Wembley debacle. Don't even get me started on that. Before the England qualifier, I got a call-up notice without specifying if it was for the full squad or the under-21 one. So upon my club's insistence to clarify, the FA president Miljan Miljanić sent a follow-up telex that I've in fact been called up for the full squad and that I'll definitely be playing at Wembley. However, as we boarded the plane for England I got told I'll be playing for the u-21s, supposedly, as it was put to me because it's in 'the national team's best interest'. I was furious. I was the one promised a start at Wembley ahead of Škoro. But no, Osim gave him the start again and then took him off again supposedly because of injury while half of the Željo squad, a team that's near the bottom of our league, got to play at Wembley. Osim is not only making a mistake in loading the national team with so many Željo players since not all of them are on form, but he's also making a huge error for tinkering with their customary playing positions. He's forcing his former club's players to play positions in the national team that they never play in their club. Everyone can see that Škoro, and even Mirsad Baljić, play target forward positions at Željo while in the national team, Osim is overnight trying to make Baljić into a full back and Škoro into a midfielder. A magician wouldn't have been able to pull that off, let alone Osim, because the habits a player picks up in his club are too set to be changed in the national team..... Yes, Osim called me up for winter training in January, but he only did it to supposedly prove to me, and to some other players, that we have no place in the national team's full squad. We played a training match versus FK Velež' club side in Mostar and lost. It was embarrassing. He put Škoro, Piksi Stojković, Radmilo Mihajlović, myself, and Semir Tuce in midfield and upfront – all attractive names for the crowd, but players that can never make a good team. We're stars in our respective clubs where we have teammates that run for us. This time there was nobody who would run and it was a disaster. We all wanted to be the main guy, and the setup didn't work. But this isn't just the problem for the five of us, almost everyone Osim calls up has this issue. The national team can't be an All-Star squad, but a new entity. Osim still doesn't get that.

Youngster Savićević would wait a whole year for his second cap. In mid-October 1987, with Euro 1988 qualifying still on and Yugoslavia playing Northern Ireland at Grbavica in Sarajevo, the Budućnost attacking midfielder came on as a second-half sub again, this time in the 76th minute for the double scorer Fadil Vokrri. With the contest already decided, Osim brought Savićević and his Budućnost teammate Dragoljub Brnović on as part of the double substitution, with Brnović coming on for Marko Mlinarić. Yugoslavia won the game convincingly 3–0, and with England destroying Turkey 8–0 at home on the same day, the stage was set for a crucial Yugoslavia vs. England clash that would decide who goes to West Germany. England needed a win or draw to automatically qualify while for Yugoslavia the match was a must-win, though the Yugoslavs would then also have to later win away at Turkey in order to qualify and overtake England. The contest was played on 11 November 1987 in front of a packed house of 70,000 at Marakana in Belgrade and Savićević again did not get a chance to play as Yugoslavia was destroyed 1–4 by Bobby Robson's England, thus failing to qualify for the Euro.

A month later, Osim gave 21-year-old Savićević his first national team start in a meaningless remaining qualifier versus Turkey in İzmir.

Over the coming period between two qualifying cycles, Yugoslavia played six friendlies from March to September 1988 and Savićević featured only in the first two (full 90 minutes versus Wales and Italy in late March 1988) as his uneasy relationship with Osim – who was not fired by the Yugoslav FA despite the failure to qualify for Euro 88 – continued.

=== 1990 World Cup qualifying ===
The 1990 FIFA World Cup qualifying started in October 1988 with Savićević—who had in the meantime completed the big-time summer 1988 move to Red Star Belgrade and right away got sent to serve the mandatory army service—not being called up for the first match away at Scotland.

Then, a month later—perhaps surprisingly knowing the coach's conservative nature—Osim brought on Savićević (who had recently had a great performance in Red Star's European Cup tie versus Milan) as a 69th-minute substitution for Bora Cvetković right after France went ahead 1–2 a minute earlier on a goal by Franck Sauzée. The substitution had a big effect, as French players had no way to counter Savićević's energy and midfield creativity. Savićević initiated a Yugoslav offensive movement that ended with Sušić scoring the equalizing goal, then while under pressure from two defenders provided a perfect cross from the left for Red Star teammate Stojković to score the winning goal in the 83rd minute as Yugoslavia recorвed a big comeback 3–2 win at the JNA Stadium in Belgrade.

Savićević's great performance against France put him in Osim's good books, for the time being at least, as he got a chance to start the next qualifier at home versus Cyprus in December 1988. Dejan, still officially in his army service, returned the favour, scoring a hat-trick as Yugoslavia won 4–0 at Marakana. The following qualifier in late April 1989 was a crucial one away at France and Osim decided not to play Savićević, choosing instead to continue with his older regulars up front such as Zlatko Vujović, Sušić, and Baždarević as Yugoslavia eked out a hard-fought scoreless draw at the Parc des Princes.

Savićević would also not play in the next qualifier away at Norway, returning only as a second-half sub for Dragan Jakovljević in September 1989 at Maksimir in Zagreb versus Scotland. With the 3–1 win over Scotland, Yugoslavia overtook the Scots at the top of the table. So, with two matches remaining, Yugoslavia were now leading the pack with ten points (four wins and two draws), followed by Scotland with ten, and France and Norway with five. In such circumstances, conservative Osim certainly was not about to tinker with the team, which meant that Savićević only got his chance in friendlies. The match point for Yugoslavia took place at Koševo in Sarajevo versus Norway in October 1989, and not surprisingly Savićević again did not get a single minute of play. The team won 1–0, and combined with the fact that Scotland got beaten by France 0–3 in Paris, Yugoslavia clinched the top spot in the group, qualifying for the World Cup in Italy. The last qualifier was a meaningless affair away at Cyprus (the match was actually played in Athens since Cyprus were penalized for the riots during their match versus Scotland), and Savićević got a chance to start along with a slew of other young and up-and-coming players from the domestic league that Osim normally shied away from using in competitive matches such as Darko Pančev, Robert Prosinečki, Branko Brnović, and Slobodan Marović.

=== 1990 World Cup ===
Heading into the World Cup, Savićević's chances of playing a larger national team role looked to have received a bit of a boost as Mehmed Baždarević, one of his competitors for an attacking midfield spot, was suspended by FIFA for spitting at the Turkish referee Yusuf Namoğlu during the crucial qualifier versus Norway. However, Savićević did not get a single minute in the first two friendlies – in March 1990 at Poland and in May 1990 at home versus Spain – leading to conclusions that he would again be looking from the outside in. But then in early June, only seven days before the opening World Cup match, he got to play the full 90 minutes at the "dress rehearsal" at Maksimir in Zagreb versus Holland where he put in an inspired performance. The game itself, however, took a back seat to the controversy caused by nationalist Croatian fans who booed the Yugoslav national anthem and thoroughly insulted the players.

Savićević chose the number 19 jersey for the tournament "out of admiration for his childhood idol Vahid Halilhodžić" who wore the number for Yugoslavia at the 1982 FIFA World Cup.

At the San Siro on 10 June 1990, the same starting eleven that faced Holland in the final friendly also started versus West Germany, including Savićević. Playing in front of almost 75,000 fans (the largest crowd of the entire 1990 FIFA World Cup), the team was picked apart by the speed and strength of the German players as Lothar Matthäus and Jürgen Klinsmann had the Elf 2–0 up before halftime. Shortly after the break Davor Jozić pulled one back for Yugoslavia, which was a signal for head coach Osim to make changes in hopes of sparking a comeback. One minute later he took off Savićević who was mostly invisible, having a game to forget much like most of the Yugoslav team, and put Dragoljub Brnović on as part of the double midfield substitution that also saw Prosinečki replace Sušić. The move did not do much, though, as Matthäus rampaged through Yugoslav defense before unleashing a powerful shot for another score. The fourth German goal came as the final insult as goalkeeper Ivković made a mess of Brehme's easy shot.

Getting nothing from the West Germany match pretty much meant that the next group contest versus Colombia was a must-win. Osim made three changes in the starting lineup, and one of them was Savićević who got benched in favour of Brnović. Yugoslavia made tough work of the plucky Colombians but got a 1–0 victory in the end with Savićević not getting a single minute of action. More or less the same lineup faced minnows the United Arab Emirates in the final group match, which meant that Savićević was again surplus to Osim's requirements as Yugoslavia won easily 4–1.

In the knockout stages, Savićević was again on the bench for the start of the match against Spain in the excruciating late afternoon heat of Verona, but got his chance early into the second half with the score still tied at 0–0, coming on for largely ineffective club teammate Darko Pančev. Substituting a striker for a midfielder meant that Osim changed his formation from 3–5–2 to a bit more defensive 3–6–1 with only Zlatko Vujović upfront. The match was soon taken over by Dragan Stojković who scored a beautiful goal in the 78th minute, but the score at the end of 90 minutes was 1–1, with Savićević putting in a confident performance. In the extra time, Stojković scored his second of the match on a masterfully placed free-kick. Incidentally, the free-kick came after a foul on Savićević during one of his surging runs across the midfield from right to left.

Despite his satisfactory showing against the Spaniards, Savićević was benched again for the quarterfinal clash against reigning world champions Argentina four days later. Starting the match in a 4–5–1 formation, Osim had Zoran Vulić back in the lineup as part of the four-man defensive unit, and youngster Prosinečki replacing injured Katanec in midfield while Vujović was now alone in attack from the very start. Riding behind midfield playmaker Stojković, Yugoslavia looked very good throughout the match even when reduced to ten men following the 31st-minute expulsion of Refik Šabanadžović. Somewhat surprisingly, Osim did not make any substitutions after the sending-off, deciding to wait until 15 minutes into the second half to put on Savićević instead of Sušić. Savićević's fresh legs gave the team a much-needed infusion of energy and another target in the middle for Stojković to pass to after his surging runs, however, Savićević was not able to convert on any of them. The most glaring miss came early on in the extra time as Stojković masterfully got free on the right side before providing a perfect pass to Savićević who was unmarked 5–6 meters from the goal line. Alone in front of keeper Sergio Goycochea and with a goal at his mercy, Savićević somehow put the ball over the bar. It was one of the best chances created by either team throughout the entire match.

=== Euro 92 ===
Savićević was called by Yugoslavia national football team to UEFA Euro 1992, but the nation would be suspended due to the Yugoslav Wars.

=== 1998 World Cup ===
Savićević was picked as a part of Yugoslavia's national squad for the 1998 FIFA World Cup. He appeared in two games, the first one being a group-stage game against the United States and the second one against the Netherlands.

Savićević missed out on Euro 2000 due to straining a thigh muscle in a match against Sturm Graz.

== Player profile ==
=== Playing style ===
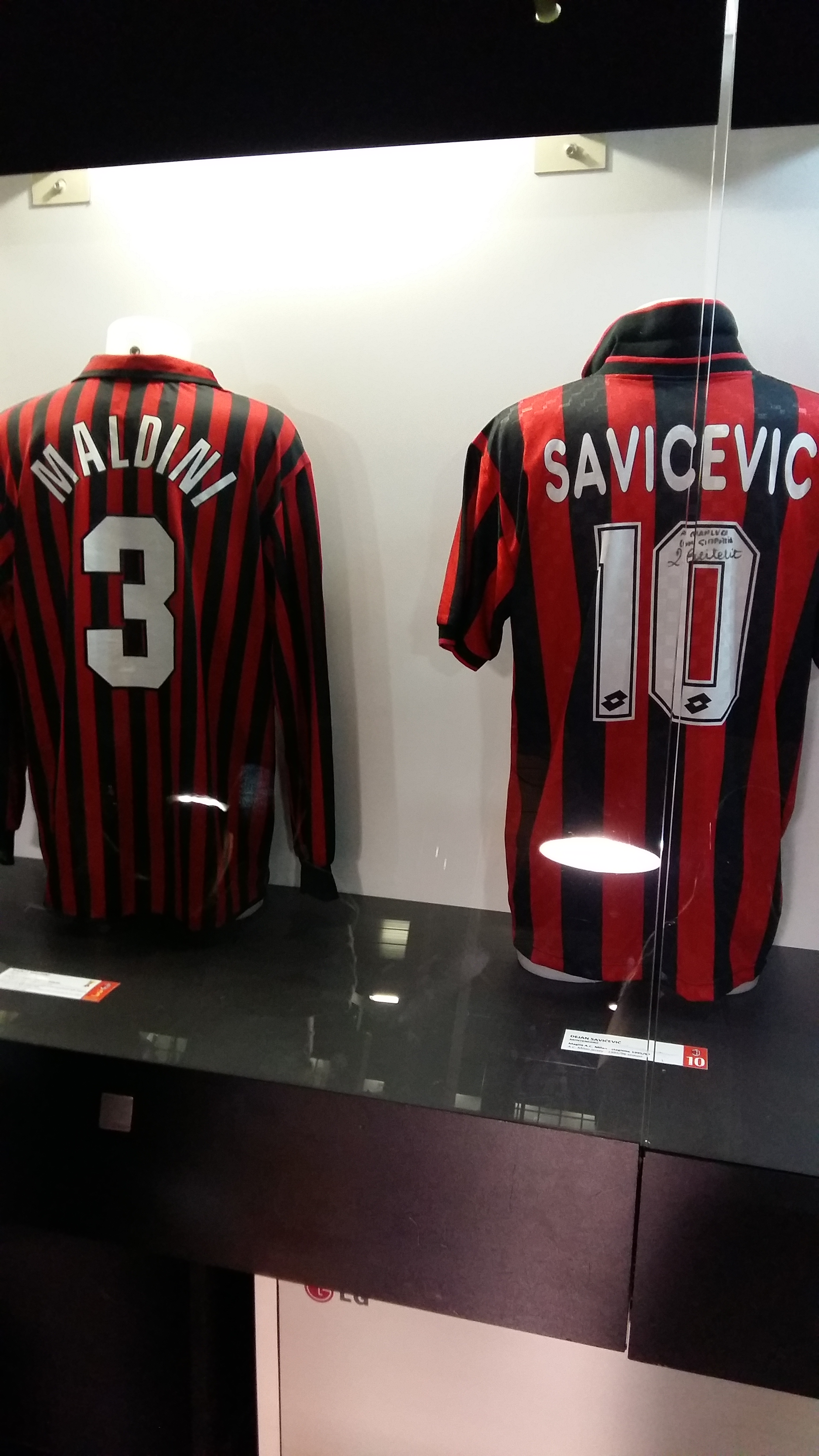
Savićević's number 10 Milan jersey (next to Paolo Maldini’s number 3 jersey) in the San Siro museum

Considered by many in the sport to be the best footballer that Montenegro has ever produced, Savićević was a classic number 10 who preferred functioning in a free role as a playmaker; throughout his career, he was usually deployed in an attacking midfield role, either in a central position behind the striker(s), or out wide on the wings, on either flank, due to his ability to provide crosses to teammates in the area from the left wing, or cut into the centre onto his stronger left foot from the right. He was also often deployed as a supporting forward, and occasionally in a central midfield role as a deep-lying playmaker in midfield, or, with even less frequency, along the front line as a main striker. A quick, technically gifted, and agile player, with an athletic physique, he was known in particular for his outstanding pace and acceleration on the ball, as well as his excellent dribbling ability, and close control, which allowed him to beat opposing players with ease; he was also highly regarded for his vision, tactical knowledge, and passing accuracy, which made him a highly effective assist provider, although he was also capable of scoring goals himself as well as creating them, due to his powerful and accurate shot on the run with either foot, as well as his precision from penalties. His talent, unpredictability and exploits during his time at Milan earned him the nickname "Il Genio" ("the genius", in Italian).

In addition to numerous accolades for his skill, technique, flair, class and creativity, he also received criticism over his poor work rate, limited stamina, lack of consistency, selfishness and his tactical indiscipline on the pitch, as well as his strong character, which led to frequent clashes with his managers and referees; he also frequently struggled with injuries throughout his career.

=== Reception ===
Savićević is widely regarded by pundits as the greatest Montenegrin player of all time, as well as one of the best players of his generation, and is considered to be one of the greatest Yugoslav footballers of all time. However, while he often received praise throughout his career from pundits, players, and managers, for his playing ability, technical skill, success, talent and creativity, he also came under criticism over his poor work-rate, lack of discipline and inconsistency. Sports journalist Gabriele Marcotti, for example, once described Savićević as "the languid genius who played the game at his own pace and, for long stretches, appeared to be in his own world".

Fabio Capello, who coached Savićević at Milan for four seasons, during which their relationship featured no shortage of confrontation and antagonism, said: "Without question, Savićević is the player with whom I had the most rows. He hardly trained, he hardly worked. And, when he was on the pitch, everybody else had to work twice as hard to make up for him. But he was an exceptional talent. And we turned him into a superstar". In 2018, Capello commented on the clashes that he and Milan's chairman at the time, Berlusconi, had over Savićević's role in the team during his time as the club's manager, stating: "I have always had an excellent relationship with Berlusconi, the only strong point of discussion was regarding Savićević. He wanted him to play, I told him that I would keep him on the pitch as long as he could run. We also had some problems with Savićević, but then we became great friends, he was one of the best players overall that I have ever coached. He was very important throughout the whole period that I was with Milan. Let us not forget that I had a half-fit Van Basten for a year, then everything that was done was done without Van Basten. He was a great player who lost himself a bit because he wanted to be operated without question."

Ivica Osim coached Savićević from 1986 until 1992 in the Yugoslav national team and butted heads with him regularly over playing time. In 2014, the retired coach said: "Yes, I had issues with him. He was a fiery character who felt he had to play. But what was I supposed to do, get rid of Zlatko Vujović who was every coach's dream and put in Savićević who was perhaps the better player, but with whom you never knew what he's going to give you on the pitch in a given match. Savićević is one of the best players I ever coached, but he also fell victim to some bad advice at that time. Today we've got decent relations, we talked it all out.... Back during the time of those frosty relations with Savićević, for me personally, it got to the point where I lost the will to coach. I got sick of going to training sessions knowing I'll be looking at Savićević, that we'll be staring each other down, and that he'll be unhappy for not playing.... I was unhappy about that too".

Talking in October 2015 about Savićević's playing days, the 1985–2001 Red Star Belgrade general-secretary Vladimir Cvetković said: "He really was a genius. When he felt like playing, that is. The problem is he frequently didn't feel like playing. But the things he did and the moves he pulled off [for us], for example in Munich and Manchester, are a thing of beauty—truly unbelievable stuff. Kind of like what Messi is doing today, only with even more flair and style. Yes, Savićević had more flair and style than Messi does today".

Red Star goalkeeper Stevan Stojanović, Savićević's teammate from 1988 until 1991, talked about the midfielder's quality and lack of application in training during a May 2021 interview: "He hated morning training sessions... When he felt like playing, he was virtually unstoppable. He was at his best when he's irritated".

A highly technical and skilful player, Savićević is considered to be one of the greatest dribblers all-time by several pundits, such as Allan Jiang and Sam Tighe of Bleacher Report, who included him in their list of the 50 greatest dribblers of all time in 2012 and 2013 respectively.

== Coaching career ==
Savićević's two-year spell as head coach of the national side was a polar opposite of his distinguished playing career.

Immediately after retiring from playing in May 2001, the thirty-four-year-old was named the FR Yugoslavia national team head coach, in succession to the short, tempestuous, and hugely disappointing 3-month tenure of Milovan Đorić. Despite Savićević's complete lack of any relevant coaching experience and the side's already faint chances of qualifying for the 2002 World Cup, the announcement was generally well received by the Yugoslav public. His appointment came as part of the general changing of the guard in the Yugoslav FA (FSJ) with Savićević's close friend Dragan Stojković taking over as FSJ president.

=== 2002 World Cup qualifying ===
At first, Savićević was part of a 3-man coaching commission with the experienced Vujadin Boškov and Ivan Ćurković by his side. At the time of their arrival to the bench, Yugoslavia was sitting in fourth place of the qualifying group with only 5 points from 4 matches, behind Russia (13 points), Switzerland (8), and Slovenia (7). However, Yugoslavia had a game in hand and with a win in Moscow had a chance to overtake Slovenia and join the Swiss tied on points in the second spot. On the other hand, a loss to Russia in Moscow would probably mean losing any hope of finishing in the top two.

Savićević thus faced a make-it-or-break-it prospect right on his coaching debut. Despite the fact that the national team was officially headed by the three-man commission, Savićević was the only one of the trio present on the sidelines during matches and was the only one available to the press. The team fielded on 2 June 2001 at Luzhniki Stadium was substantially the same as Đorić's, both in names called up and playing formation. Other than two debutants—goalkeeper Radovan Radaković and defensive midfielder Boban Dmitrović—the gist of the starting squad was still made up of old guard: players like Predrag Mijatović, Siniša Mihajlović, and Miroslav Đukić, all of whom were well over thirty, as well as longtime defensive mainstays such as Zoran Mirković and Goran Đorović. With a defensive approach and mostly unimaginative play with very little created through midfield, Yugoslavia never looked capable of winning. The match ended 1–1 as Russians went ahead following Radaković's poor reaction and Yugoslavia tied some fifteen minutes later on Mijatović's scrambled goal that he managed to put away after Savo Milošević's header hit the post. The press reaction was not overly negative as the tied score still had the team on course for a second-place finish.

After the next two qualifiers, home and away against Faroe Islands, in which Yugoslavia recorded easy wins, came the decision time – facing Switzerland in a must-win situation away on Saturday, 1 September 2001. Cheered on by a large expatriate crowd in Basel, Yugoslavia ended up winning 1–2 in what was easily the team's best showing under Savićević to date, setting up the deciding match at home versus Slovenia four days later.

Playing on a difficult surface as the Partizan Stadium pitch was soaked from the heavy rain that had been pouring throughout the match day, Yugoslavia went behind early and only managed to tie the score by the end, which was not enough for the second place. Despite dominating proceedings through veteran Mijatović who was the offensive focal point, the second goal proved elusive. The chance still existed in theory if the Faroe Islands managed to win or draw at Slovenia in the final match, however, such unlikely scenario did not happen. After the Slovenia game, Savićević bemoaned the bad luck, citing playing in the rain on a soaked surface without injured regulars Mirković and Vladimir Jugović as the main reasons why his team failed to beat Slovenia.

Savićević was handed the coaching duties all by himself in late December 2001. At the time, he claimed to have taken the solo job on a temporary basis only, since Dušan Bajević rejected it. Savićević also intimated the new permanent coach would take over by the summer of 2002. However, that did not happen and he remained in post until June 2003.

=== Euro 2004 qualifying ===
Savićević began the Euro 2004 qualifying campaign on 12 October 2002 against Italy. Savićević used a 3–5–2 formation as the match ended 1–1 with Nemanja Vidić making his debut.

Throughout his reign, he failed to achieve a settled team, and his personal disputes with Mateja Kežman precipitated the striker to temporarily retire from international football. Savićević finally resigned on 20 June 2003, after a humiliating 1–2 defeat to Azerbaijan in a Euro 2004 qualifier, which was also the team's fifth defeat in a row. His overall managerial record was 4 wins, 11 losses, and 2 draws, in addition to 4 wins, 2 losses, and 2 ties as part of the commission.

== Career statistics ==
=== Club ===
Appearances and goals by club, season and competition
Club	Season	League			National cup (Note: Includes Yugoslav Cup, Coppa Italia, Austrian Cup)		Europe		Other		Total	
Club	Season	Division	Apps	Goals	Apps	Goals	Apps	Goals	Apps	Goals	Apps	Goals
Budućnost Titograd	1982–83	Yugoslav First League	2	0			—		—		2	0
Budućnost Titograd	1983–84	Yugoslav First League	7	1			—		—		7	1
Budućnost Titograd	1984–85	Yugoslav First League	29	6			—		—		29	6
Budućnost Titograd	1985–86	Yugoslav First League	32	10			—		—		32	10
Budućnost Titograd	1986–87	Yugoslav First League	31	9			—		—		31	9
Budućnost Titograd	1987–88	Yugoslav First League	29	10			—		—		29	10
Budućnost Titograd	Total		130	36			—		—		130	36
Red Star Belgrade	1988–89	Yugoslav First League	0	0	0	0	3	1	—		3	1
Red Star Belgrade	1989–90	Yugoslav First League	25	10	7	4	6 (Note: Appearances in UEFA Cup)	3	—		38	17
Red Star Belgrade	1990–91	Yugoslav First League	25	8	7	3	7 (Note: Appearances in European Cup)	3	—		39	14
Red Star Belgrade	1991–92	Yugoslav First League	22	5	7	2	4	2	2 (Note: One appearance in UEFA Super Cup, one appearance in Intercontinental Cup)	0	35	9
Red Star Belgrade	Total		72	23	21	9	20	9	2	0	115	41
Milan	1992–93	Serie A	10	4	4	3	3 (Note: Appearances in UEFA Champions League)	0	—		17	7
Milan	1993–94	Serie A	20	0	3	1	7	3	2 (Note: One appearance in UEFA Super Cup, one appearance in Supercoppa Italiana)	0	32	4
Milan	1994–95	Serie A	19	9	1	0	6	2	3 (Note: Two appearances in UEFA Super Cup, one appearance in Intercontinental Cup)	0	29	11
Milan	1995–96	Serie A	23	6	3	2	3	1	—		29	9
Milan	1996–97	Serie A	17	1	2	0	2	0	1 (Note: Appearance in Supercoppa Italiana)	1	22	2
Milan	1997–98	Serie A	8	0	7	1	0	0	—		15	1
Milan	Total		97	20	20	7	21	6	6	1	144	34
Red Star Belgrade	1998–99	First League of FR Yugoslavia	3	0	0	0	0	0	—		3	0
Rapid Wien	1999–2000	Austrian Bundesliga	22	11	0	0	4	1	—		26	12
Rapid Wien	2000–01	Austrian Bundesliga	22	7	3	0	3	1	—		28	8
Rapid Wien	Total		44	18	3	0	7	2	—		54	20
Career total			346	97	44	16	48	17	8	1	446	131

=== International ===
Appearances and goals by national team and year
National team	Year	Apps	Goals
SFR Yugoslavia	1986	1	1
SFR Yugoslavia	1987	2	0
SFR Yugoslavia	1988	4	3
SFR Yugoslavia	1989	5	1
SFR Yugoslavia	1990	5	0
SFR Yugoslavia	1991	9	5
SFR Yugoslavia	1992	1	0
FR Yugoslavia	1993*	0	0
FR Yugoslavia	1994	2	0
FR Yugoslavia	1995	3	2
FR Yugoslavia	1996	6	4
FR Yugoslavia	1997	10	3
FR Yugoslavia	1998	4	0
FR Yugoslavia	1999	4	0
Total		56	19

- Note: Yugoslavia was banned from international football in 1993, since 1994 FR Yugoslavia became the successor of SFR Yugoslavia national team.

== Managerial statistics ==
As of match played 4 June 2022

Managerial record by team and tenure
Team	From	To	Record				
Team	From	To	P	W	D	L	Win %
Serbia and Montenegro	2001	2003	17	4	3	10	23.53
Total			17	4	3	10	23.53

== Honours ==
Red Star Belgrade

- SFR Yugoslavia Champions: 1989–90, 1990–91, 1991–92
- Yugoslav Cup: 1989–90
- European Cup: 1990–91
- Intercontinental Cup: 1991

AC Milan

- Serie A: 1992–93, 1993–94, 1995–96
- Supercoppa Italiana: 1993, 1994
- UEFA Champions League: 1993–94
- European Super Cup: 1994

Yugoslavia

- 1990 UEFA European Under-21 Football Championship (runners-up)

Individual

- Ballon d'Or second place: 1991
- AC Milan Hall of Fame
- Golden Badge for the best athlete of Yugoslavia: 1991
- SD Crvena Zvezda Best Athlete: 1991
- FR Yugoslavia Footballer of the Year: 1995
- ADN Eastern European Footballer of the Season: 1995
- The Sixth Star of Red Star (Šesta Zvezdina zvezda), as part of the 1991 Red Star team

== Administrative and political career ==
Savićević is active in the political life of Montenegro where he has been a member and public supporter of the Democratic Party of Socialists (DPS), a political organization that ruled Montenegro continually from 1990 until 2020. During the fall of 1996, while an active player with AC Milan, Savićević appeared in the DPS television campaign ads ahead of the 1996 parliamentary election in Montenegro. In 1997, during a split in the party leadership between Momir Bulatović and Milo Đukanović, Savićević came out in support of Đukanović who eventually ended up prevailing in the inter-party showdown thus cementing his hold on power in Montenegro.

In the summer of 2004, approximately one year after unceremoniously ending his Serbia and Montenegro national team head coaching stint, thirty-seven-year-old Savićević once again became the president of the Football Association of Montenegro (FSCG), a local regional football sub-association under the umbrella of the Football Association of Serbia and Montenegro (FSSCG).

On 10 July 2009, Savićević got re-elected as Montenegrin FA president for another four-year period at the FSCG delegate vote where he was the only candidate. On 11 July 2013, he got re-elected one more time, again as the only candidate. On 5 July 2017, he got re-elected for his fifth term until 2021, again as the only candidate.

With the DPS losing power in Montenegro after thirty years following the 2020 parliamentary election, reports appeared about Savićević's DPS-sponsored twenty-year FSCG reign also being challenged for the first time. During spring 2021, ahead of the late June 2021 FSCG presidential vote, it became clear Savićević would have a candidate running against him for the first time since he became the FSCG president.

As the FSCG president, Savićević has so far presided over eight national team qualifying cycles—2010 World Cup (with Zoran Filipović as head coach), Euro 2012 (Zlatko Kranjčar as head coach), 2014 World Cup (Branko Brnović as head coach), Euro 2016 (Brnović again as head coach), 2018 World Cup (Ljubiša Tumbaković as head coach), Euro 2020 (Tumbaković followed by Faruk Hadžibegić in the head coaching post), 2022 World Cup (Miodrag Radulović as head coach), and Euro 2024 (Radulović as head coach again)—with Montenegro failing to qualify each time; the best result coming in Euro 2012 qualifying when they managed to get to the two-leg play-offs, losing 0–3 on aggregate to Czech Republic. As of 2022, Montenegro remains among nineteen UEFA national teams—alongside Andorra, Armenia, Azerbaijan, Belarus, Cyprus, Estonia, Faroe Islands, Georgia, Gibraltar, Kazakhstan, Kosovo, Israel, Lichtenstein, Lithuania, Luxembourg, Malta, Moldova and San Marino – never to have qualified for a FIFA World Cup or UEFA Euro.

Additionally, the Montenegrin under-21 national team has participated in nine European U-21 Championship qualifying campaigns during Savićević's presidency—2009, 2011, 2013, 2015, 2017, 2019, 2021, 2023, and 2025—failing to make the final tournament each time.

Furthermore, Savićević's time on the job has been marked by frequent public feuding and controversy.

=== 2004–2005 media campaign against Milorad Kosanović ===
On 17 November 2004, the Serbia and Montenegro national under-21 team lost 0–4 against Belgium in a 2006 European Under-21 Championship qualifier played in Lokeren. In the wake of the disappointing result, FSCG president Savićević publicly came out against the U-21 head coach Milorad Kosanović, calling on the coach to resign over the loss and specifically taking issue with Kosanović not calling up any players from the Montenegro-based clubs for the Belgium match. In support of his claims, Savićević added that "twenty-one-year-old Miroslav Vujadinović from Budućnost Podgorica wasn't even called up for the under-21 squad despite being the best young goalkeeper in Europe" before concluding that such action constitutes "discrimination of Montenegro".

Over the coming months, Savićević exerted continuous pressure within the FSSCG ranks for Kosanović to be fired, even going so far as to semi-officially boycott the under-21 team by refusing to allow Montenegrin players to turn up for Kosanović's callups. In late 2004, in an effort to ease the tense internal FSSCG standoff, FSSCG president Dragan Stojković (Savićević's close personal friend and longtime Red Star and Yugoslavia teammate during their playing days) reportedly asked Kosanović to resign, which the coach vehemently refused. As a result of the episode, all four Serbia (FSS)-delegated members of the FSSCG expert council – Dušan Savić, Jovica Škoro, Milovan Đorić, and Miroslav Tanjga – resigned in protest, with Savić stating he "wants no part in this dirty political game" while criticizing Savićević and FSCG for interfering in the under-21 head coach's job.

After initially managing to resist, Kosanović eventually gave in, resigning some four months later on 8 March 2005.

=== Montenegrin independence referendum ===
Savićević then publicly came out in favour of Montenegrin independence, becoming an important part of the pro-independence campaign organized by the Movement for Independent Montenegro. He attended and spoke at rallies alongside Montenegrin Prime Minister Milo Đukanović. Savićević's face also appeared on billboards urging the citizens of Montenegro to vote 'Yes' at the referendum.

In the spring of 2006, while interviewed for Montenegrin local station NTV Montena, Savićević admitted to playing "in a couple of fixed matches" while with Budućnost in the old Yugoslav First League during the 1980s. He also claimed on the same occasion that most of the matches in that season's (2005–06) Serbia-Montenegro Superliga are fixed, but declined to elaborate or provide evidence, saying: "I don't want to be killed because of football like Branko Bulatović". Such controversial claims caused a lot of reaction. Serbia-Montenegro FA (FSSCG) announced a formal investigation, arranging a hearing for Savićević to provide details and evidence of his claims. Others, like FK Partizan vice-president Ratomir Babić, accused Savićević of "scoring political points for his mentors in the separatist-oriented Montenegrin regime by intentionally spreading explosive false rumours in order to bring the union's league into disrepute".

=== 2006 feud with Rajo Božović ===
In parallel, all throughout 2006, Savićević butted heads with his own second-in-command—FSCG vice-president and FK Zeta club president Radojica "Rajo" Božović.

Their feud began in mid-March 2006 in the aftermath of the Zeta vs. Budućnost Serbia-Montenegro SuperLiga fixture at Zeta's Trešnjica ground on 10 March 2006 that saw visitors Budućnost walk off the pitch 11 minutes before full time, an action initiated and carried out from the pitch sidelines by the club's director Žarko Vukčević in protest over Zeta's 2-2 equalizer that Budućnost felt was offside. Following a round of internal FSSCG investigations amid continual sniping in the press, the match was registered with a 3-0 administrative scoreline for Zeta and Budućnost was docked 3 points as punishment.

Initially, the row between the two leading FSCG executives culminated on 12 May 2006 during an FSSCG executive board meeting in Belgrade where Savićević and Božović participated as representatives of the provincial Montenegrin FA (FSCG) sub-association. At the said meeting, Savićević reportedly abruptly left the premises following a vicious two-minute shouting match with Božović that started after Božović introduced a motion for an FSSCG investigation of Savićević's media claims about match-fixing as well his mentions of FK Zeta in this regard.

Since Montenegro became independent some ten days later on 21 May 2006, the FSCG became the newly created country's top footballing body, responsible for organizing its football league as well as for assembling its national team. Savićević's FSCG presidential term continued with Božović as his vice president.

Several months later, during late summer 2006, the vicious public rift between the top two FSCG administrators was reignited following the cancellation of the FK Zeta versus Budućnost Montenegrin First League fixture that had been scheduled for 4 September 2006 but ended up not getting played due to threats of fan violence and incidents outside of Zeta's Trešnjica ground in the Podgorica suburb of Golubovci. As scuffles broke out between members of the two clubs' respective managements after Božović refused to let the rivals enter the stadium, Božović subsequently publicly accused Savićević of favouring his old club Budućnost, working against Zeta, and tampering with the Montenegrin First League referee selection process.

An element of the public feuding between two men—both with deep ties within Montenegro's ruling political party, the Democratic Party of Socialists (DPS)—also had a political background over a protracted contentious issue of the redrawing of Podgorica municipal borders and status of Golubovci within the potentially new boundaries. As different internal DPS factions pursued their own interests regarding the municipal borders issue, press outlets portrayed Savićević as closely aligned with the DPS' so-called 'Podgorica lobby' (centred around Podgorica mayor, high-ranking DPS member, and FK Budućnost's financial benefactor Miomir Mugoša as well as the city service manager and FK Budućnost club president Vladan Vučelić) while Božović was being mentioned as a protege of the powerful security state operative, presidential security advisor, and former DPS cabinet minister Vukašin Maraš who had been pushing the so-called 'Zeta lobby' within DPS with the help of the Montenegrin government cabinet minister Migo Stijepović. One day after the incident in Golubovci, Savićević responded by publicly calling on the Montenegrin government and ruling political party, the DPS, to "get involved and solve the issues within the FSCG".

In mid-October 2006, FSCG held an assembly meeting, convened by its president Savićević, during which the majority of delegates supported his motion to remove Božović, deciding by a 37–5 vote to relieve Božović of his FSCG vice-presidential duties as well as his seat on the FSCG executive committee. For his part, Božović, who was not present at the assembly due to "unforeseen family obligations", mostly accepted the turn of events and began keeping a lower profile, reportedly on instruction from senior DPS members.

==== Continued fallout ====
Three years later, on 6 May 2009, the FK Zeta versus Sutjeska Montenegrin First League fixture at Zeta's home ground in Golubovci got abandoned before kickoff due to the match referee Jovan Kaluđerović's claims of receiving verbal death threats from Zeta owner Rajo Božović. As stated in the match delegate Hazbo Mustajbašić's report based on Kaluđerović's claims, Božović verbally threatened Kaluđerović, allegedly saying "we have to win today" and "I'll take your head off" upon entering the referee's dressing room, all of which Božović denied while announcing intention of pressing charges against Kaluđerović for slander. Within weeks, based on the match delegate report, the Savićević-led FSCG's disciplinary commission punished Božović with a lifetime ban on performing football-related functions in competitions administered by the FSCG in addition to docking one point from FK Zeta.

Over the following decade, save for two prominent instances of Božović's ban being enforced by the Savićević-led FSCG—both occurring during the 2016–17 Montenegrin First League season, the antagonism between two men seemingly simmered down, with Božović even publicly praising Savićević as "brave, honourable, proud, and dignified" in a 2017 interview and later revealing that the two have supposedly settled their differences "in the manner of old Montenegrins" during an encounter at a party in Nikšić organized by Brano Mićunović and attended by Montenegrin president Milo Đukanović and other "very important people from the system".

=== 2006–2011 feud with Dan newspaper ===
Also in 2006, simultaneous to publicly feuding with his own FSCG vice-president Božović, Savićević began rowing with Podgorica's Dan daily newspaper, a protracted issue that continued off-and-on throughout the following five years.

Irritated by the paper's criticism of his work as FSCG's boss, his pro-independence political engagement during the 2006 referendum campaign, as well as his ties with the regime of Milo Đukanović, Savićević verbally abused, shouted at, and generally menaced Dan journalists during FSCG press conferences. He especially went after the Dan sports editor Veselin Drljević (former referee and former FSCG member) with whom he has a long-standing personal feud.

In March 2007, as the Montenegro national team was set to begin playing official matches, Savićević raised even more controversy when, in an unprecedented move, he personally banned Dan journalists from attending the national team's debut match, a home friendly versus Hungary. Savićević's ban on Dan journalists continued for the rest of 2007 and into 2008 as the paper's editor-in-chief Mladen Milutinović wrote appeals to various international bodies about the situation, including the International Sports Press Association (AIPS). During late April and early May 2009, the issue was discussed at the AIPS congress in Milan. Under pressure from AIPS, two-and-a-half years after initially issuing the ban, Savićević relented, allowing matchday accreditation for Dan journalists ahead of Montenegro's home friendly versus Wales in August 2009.

The antagonism reignited two years later during the Euro 2012 qualifying cycle. All throughout 2011, Savićević publicly expressed anger with Dan's criticism of the national team head coach Zlatko Kranjčar, calling the publication a "Serbian-oriented paper that never has and never will accept Montenegro as an independent state". Savićević even returned to his old ways on 7 October 2011, for the Montenegro vs. England Euro 2012 qualifier, refusing to issue accreditation for Dan. Because of this, a protest against Savićević was published in their pages.

Then, a month later in November 2011, for the deciding 2nd leg playoff qualifier at home against Czech Republic, Savićević again did the same thing, which led to more critical coverage by the paper. On 17 November 2011, in the wake of the playoff loss to the Czechs, Savićević appeared on TV Vijesti's talk show Načisto where he was asked by the host Petar Komnenić about his problems with Dan. Savićević's response was that Dan is an "unimportant media outlet" and that he prefers giving accreditation to "objective outlets". Dan responded with more pointed criticism of Savićević through sarcasm and ridicule, which led to Savićević scheduling a press conference on Saturday, 19 November 2011 where he delivered more verbal vitriol towards the paper including a bizarre offer of subjecting himself to a drug test and paying out €2 million to Dan if the test results come in positive while asking for €500,000 from the paper if the test result is negative. Dan responded in the paper's next day issue with more veiled ridicule of Savićević.

== Personal life ==
=== Marriage, relationships, and children ===
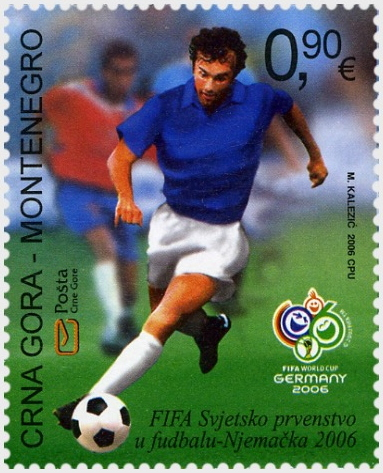
Savićević on a 2006 stamp of Montenegro

In the late 1980s, Savićević married Valentina "Vanja" Brajović. The couple had met and began dating a few years earlier in Titograd while Savićević played for FK Budućnost and teenage Vanja attended the local streamlined touristic high school. Their first child, son Vladimir, was born in November 1989 in Belgrade while Savićević played for Red Star. While living in Belgrade, Savićević and Brajović reportedly resided in an apartment they leased from Serbian professional handballer Svetlana Kitić who had been playing abroad in Italy during that time. Their second child, daughter Tamara, was born in 1992. The couple divorced in 2000.

Their son Vladimir Savićević would go on to pursue professional football as well, starting out with FK Mladost Podgorica youth teams, and being capped for the Montenegrin U19 team.

Since the mid-2010s, FSCG president Savićević has been in a relationship with Jelena Babić from Podgorica.

In November 2019, Savićević's daughter Tamara married professional footballer Aleksandar Kapisoda, three months after giving birth to their daughter, Savićević's grandchild.

Savićević has some Romani ancestry.

=== Traffic infractions ===
==== 2004 speeding incident ====
Following a night out in Trebinje on Saturday, 18 September 2004, Savićević was involved in an incident with Podgorica police on his way home, at around 2:30 am Sunday morning. After driving his Audi TT at a high speed through Podgorica streets and running a red light, he was stopped by a police patrol. According to the police, when stopped, Savićević insulted the policeman with a series of obscenities, including a statement: "I'm God, laws don't apply to me".

A misdemeanor investigation request (prekršajna prijava) was filed against Savićević by the police.

==== 2005 motorcycle crash ====
On Thursday, 29 September 2005 at around 5:30pm, Savićević was severely injured in a traffic accident on Stanko Dragojević Boulevard in Podgorica in front of the Montenegrin National Theatre (CNP) building. The thirty-nine-year-old FSCG president fractured both arms and a pelvic bone after crashing his Yamaha motorcycle into the rear end of a moving Volkswagen Golf Mk4 vehicle (driven by thirty-four-year-old Podgorica resident Ljubiša Golubović), becoming airborne, and landing hard on the pavement.

The same night, Savićević underwent a two-and-a-half-hour surgery at Podgorica's Kliničko-bolnički centar to contain the effects of his three fractures before being placed in intensive care. Some ten days later, the retired footballer arranged to be transported to a specialized orthopedic medical facility in Hanover, Germany where he had three more surgeries within a span of a week—one on each arm and one on his pelvic bone. His subsequent rehabilitation took about six months.

==== 2025 speeding incident and police detention ====
On Saturday night, 5 July 2025, Savićević was stopped by a police patrol in Herceg Novi for speeding and illegal overtaking. The 58-year-old FSCG president and FIFA Council member Savićević reportedly refused the breathalyzer test at which point he was apprehended by the police and handed over to the misdemeanour judge who promptly issued a €1,000 fine for refusing the breathalyzer along with a four-month ban on operating motor vehicles and three demerit points.

== In popular culture ==
In 1998, Serbian comedy rock band The Kuguars recorded the song "Dejo" (a cover of Harry Belafonte song "Day-O"), dedicating it to Savićević.

=== 1999 heckler viral video ===
Someone off to the side had been insulting me incessantly by swearing at me before I could no longer take it, so I turned – only to see this short guy with no more than two teeth in his mouth wearing a Croatian šahovnica jersey and track pants. And, I gave it right back to him. Then I told the filmmaker to edit that out and he assured me he would. A couple of months later, he called me in Vienna telling me the movie is done and asking my address to send me a tape. My stomach turned when I saw that he hadn't edited that out. You can imagine what I told him next time we talked.

— Savićević on his viral video from Het laatste Joegoslavische elftal.

Savićević is the protagonist of a widely circulated viral video from the 2000 Dutch documentary Het laatste Joegoslavische elftal (The Last Yugoslav Football Team) by Vuk Janić about the 1987 FIFA World Youth Championship winning SFR Yugoslavia under-20 team.

Conceptualized as a "what might've been" sentimental homage of sorts, ostensibly to SFR Yugoslavia's up-and-coming late 1980s football generation that never got a chance to play together on the sport's biggest stage but also to the disintegrated country, the documentary interviews different members of the 1987 youth side—such as Robert Prosinečki, Predrag Mijatović, and Zvonimir Boban—who were by 1999 split between the senior national teams of FR Yugoslavia and Croatia. Other individuals—including Savićević, who was winding down his playing career at Rapid Vienna and thirty-year-old SS Lazio star Siniša Mihajlović as well as fifty-eight-year-old coach Ivica Osim coaching Sturm Graz at the time—are featured prominently in the documentary film despite not being members of the 1987 youth team. In Savićević's case, the filmmaking crew had behind-the-scenes access to him at his home in Vienna as well as his club side's Austrian Bundesliga matches and FR Yugoslavia national team qualifying fixtures.

Some of the film's footage was shot in October 1999 against the backdrop of the FR Yugoslavia and Croatia national teams playing the deciding Euro 2000 qualifier in Zagreb. The particular part of the film that went viral shows thirty-three-year-old Savićević being interviewed the day before Croatia versus Yugoslavia match in front of the hotel where the Yugoslav team was staying. He is wearing Yugoslavia training gear and as such is easily spotted and recognized by people strolling by. As Dejan is answering a question, a man on the street, presumably a Croatian fan, is heard shouting off-camera: "You're a piece of shit!".

Savićević looks to the side and responds to the heckler by berating him with an obscenity-laced tirade of his own. After insulting him sufficiently, Savićević returns his attention to the interview and continues answering the question right where he left off without missing a beat.

In subsequent interviews after the video went viral, Savićević has claimed that the film's director Janić broke their verbal agreement that the swearing part would not be included in the final version of the film.

== Notes ==
Awards
Preceded by Dragutin Topić	(Socialist Federal Republic of Yugoslavia) The Best Athlete of Yugoslavia; 1991	Succeeded by Slobodan Branković (FR Yugoslavia)
