= List of FK Radnički Niš seasons =

This is a list of all seasons played by FK Radnički Niš in domestic and European football, from 1945 to the most recent completed season.

This list details the club's achievements in all major competitions, and the top scorers for each season (note that only goals scored in league matches are taken into account).

The tables below provide a summary of the club's performance by season in all official competitions, including domestic leagues, cups and European club competitions.

== Seasons ==
=== SFR Yugoslavia era (1945–1992) ===
| Season | Division | P | W | D^{[A]} | L | F | A | Pts | Pos | Cup | Competition | Round | Player | Goals |
| Season | League | | | | | | | | | Cup | European competitions | | Top goalscorer | |
|---|---|---|---|---|---|---|---|---|---|---|---|---|---|---|
| 1945–46 | County League - Niš | — | — | — | — | — | — | — | 2nd | —N/a | | | | |
| 1946–47^{[B]} | First League | 26 | 4 | 5 | 17 | 26 | 76 | 13 | 13th ↓ | —N/a | | | | |
| 1947–48 | Serbian IV Zone | – | — | — | — | — | — | – | 5th | | | | | |
| 1948–49 | Serbian IV Zone | – | — | — | — | — | — | – | 3rd ↑ | | | | | |
| 1950 | Republican League - Serbia | 24 | — | — | — | — | — | 26 | 5th | | | | | |
| 1951 | Republican League - Serbia | 26 | — | — | — | — | — | 21 | 12th ↓ | R16 | | | | |
| 1952 | Subassociation League - Niš | — | — | — | — | — | — | — | 1st | —N/a | | | | |
| 1952–53 | Subassociation League - Niš | — | — | — | — | — | — | — | 1st ↑ | R16 | | | | |
| 1953–54 | Republican League - Serbia East | — | — | — | — | — | — | — | 4th | | | | | |
| 1954–55 | Republican League - Serbia East | — | — | — | — | — | — | — | 2nd ↑ | R16 | | | | |
| 1955–56 | Second League - IV Zone | 24 | 9 | 5 | 10 | 47 | 32 | 23 | 9th | | | | | |
| 1956–57 | Second League - IV Zone | 24 | 15 | 2 | 7 | 63 | 37 | 32 | 2nd | | | | | |
| 1957–58 | Second League - IV Zone | 22 | 13 | 3 | 6 | 62 | 28 | 29 | 3rd | | | | | |
| 1958–59 | Second League - East | 22 | 8 | 4 | 10 | 48 | 36 | 20 | 9th | R32 | | | (Socialist Federal Republic of Yugoslavia) Vitomir Sovrović | 17 |
| 1959–60 | Second League - East | 22 | 7 | 6 | 9 | 43 | 46 | 20 | 9th | R16 | | | (Socialist Federal Republic of Yugoslavia) Stevan Balov | 12 |
| 1960–61 | Second League - East | 22 | 8 | 7 | 7 | 36 | 36 | 23 | 5th | | | | (Socialist Federal Republic of Yugoslavia) Vitomir Sovrović | 11 |
| 1961–62 | Second League - East | 22 | 11 | 5 | 6 | 48 | 39 | 27 | 2nd ↑ | R32 | | | (Socialist Federal Republic of Yugoslavia) Vitomir Sovrović | 14 |
| 1962–63 | First League | 26 | 10 | 6 | 10 | 43 | 33 | 26 | 6th | R32 | | | (Socialist Federal Republic of Yugoslavia) Vitomir Sovrović | 10 |
| 1963–64 | First League | 26 | 10 | 4 | 12 | 33 | 34 | 24 | 8th | R16 | Balkans Cup | GS | (Socialist Federal Republic of Yugoslavia) Stevan Ostojić | 14 |
| 1964–65 | First League | 30 | 9 | 10 | 9 | 39 | 33 | 28 | 7th | QF | Intertoto Cup | GS | (Socialist Federal Republic of Yugoslavia) Jovan Anđelković | 13 |
| 1965–66 | First League | 30 | 10 | 9 | 11 | 44 | 35 | 29 | 7th | | Intertoto Cup | GS | (Socialist Federal Republic of Yugoslavia) Milorad Janković | 13 |
| 1966–67 | First League | 30 | 13 | 4 | 13 | 32 | 35 | 30 | 9th | R16 | | | (Socialist Federal Republic of Yugoslavia) Jovan Anđelković | 9 |
| 1967–68 | First League | 30 | 13 | 2 | 15 | 36 | 48 | 28 | 9th | R16 | | | (Socialist Federal Republic of Yugoslavia) Milorad Janković | 10 |
| 1968–69 | First League | 34 | 12 | 10 | 12 | 35 | 36 | 34 | 7th | R16 | | | (Socialist Federal Republic of Yugoslavia) Nenad Cvetković | 14 |
| 1969–70 | First League | 34 | 14 | 9 | 11 | 36 | 33 | 37 | 8th | SF | | | (Socialist Federal Republic of Yugoslavia) Nenad Cvetković | 10 |
| 1970–71 | First League | 34 | 11 | 9 | 14 | 38 | 43 | 31 | 11th | | | | (Socialist Federal Republic of Yugoslavia) Nenad Cvetković | 13 |
| 1971–72 | First League | 34 | 11 | 7 | 16 | 38 | 49 | 29 | 15th | QF | | | (Socialist Federal Republic of Yugoslavia) Nenad Cvetković | 16 |
| 1972–73 | First League | 34 | 10 | 10 | 14 | 24 | 40 | 30 | 11th | —N/a | | | (Socialist Federal Republic of Yugoslavia) Pavle Grubješić | 6 |
| 1973–74 | First League | 34 | 11 | 9 | 14 | 29 | 43 | 31 | 15th | QF | | | (Socialist Federal Republic of Yugoslavia) Slobodan Antić | 7 |
| 1974–75 | First League | 34 | 9 | 14 | 11 | 31 | 37 | 32 | 16th | R32 | | | (Socialist Federal Republic of Yugoslavia) Miodrag Stojiljković | 9 |
| 1975–76 | First League | 34 | 7 | 15 | 12 | 30 | 41 | 29 | 16th | R16 | Balkans Cup | W | (Socialist Federal Republic of Yugoslavia) Dušan Mitošević (Socialist Federal Republic of Yugoslavia) Slobodan Antić | 6 |
| 1976–77 | First League | 34 | 13 | 8 | 13 | 40 | 43 | 34 | 7th | SF | | | (Socialist Federal Republic of Yugoslavia) Dušan Mitošević (Socialist Federal Republic of Yugoslavia) Miroslav Vojinović | 8 |
| 1977–78 | First League | 34 | 9 | 12 | 13 | 31 | 42 | 30 | 14th | R32 | | | (Socialist Federal Republic of Yugoslavia) Dušan Mitošević | 12 |
| 1978–79 | First League | 34 | 11 | 13 | 10 | 38 | 34 | 35 | 7th | QF | | | (Socialist Federal Republic of Yugoslavia) Vladimir Jocić | 12 |
| 1979–80 | First League | 34 | 14 | 11 | 9 | 49 | 32 | 39 | 3rd | R32 | | | (Socialist Federal Republic of Yugoslavia) Dušan Mitošević | 9 |
| 1980–81 | First League | 34 | 13 | 15 | 6 | 39 | 28 | 41 | 3rd | QF | UEFA Cup | R3 | (Socialist Federal Republic of Yugoslavia) Dušan Mitošević (Socialist Federal Republic of Yugoslavia) Dragan Pantelić (Socialist Federal Republic of Yugoslavia) Miodrag Stojiljković | 7 |
| 1981–82 | First League | 34 | 12 | 8 | 14 | 37 | 44 | 32 | 11th | R32 | UEFA Cup | SF | (Socialist Federal Republic of Yugoslavia) Dragan Radosavljević | 5 |
| 1982–83 | First League | 34 | 15 | 10 | 9 | 45 | 39 | 40 | 4th | R32 | | | (Socialist Federal Republic of Yugoslavia) Dušan Mitošević | 12 |
| 1983–84 | First League | 34 | 15 | 3 | 16 | 40 | 47 | 33 | 7th | QF | UEFA Cup | R3 | (Socialist Federal Republic of Yugoslavia) Miroslav Aleksić | 8 |
| 1984–85 | First League | 34 | 8 | 11 | 15 | 27 | 46 | 27 | 18th ↓ | R32 | | | (Socialist Federal Republic of Yugoslavia) Miroslav Aleksić (Socialist Federal Republic of Yugoslavia) Dragiša Binić | 4 |
| 1985–86 | Second League - East | 34 | 22 | 8 | 4 | 65 | 21 | 52 | 1st ↑ | QF | | | (Socialist Federal Republic of Yugoslavia) Slavoljub Nikolić | 19 |
| 1986–87 | First League | 34 | 11 | 8 | 15 | 39 | 49 | 30 | 16th | R32 | | | (Socialist Federal Republic of Yugoslavia) Slavoljub Nikolić | 8 |
| 1987–88 | First League | 34 | 14 | 4 | 16 | 48 | 46 | 32 | 7th | QF | | | (Socialist Federal Republic of Yugoslavia) Blagoja Kitanovski | 9 |
| 1988–89 | First League | 34 | 14 | 7 (3) | 13 | 42 | 35 | 31 | 7th | R16 | Balkans Cup | RU | (Socialist Federal Republic of Yugoslavia) Dejan Lukić | 11 |
| 1989–90 | First League | 34 | 12 | 8 (2) | 14 | 42 | 48 | 26 | 15th | R32 | | | (Socialist Federal Republic of Yugoslavia) Josip Višnjić | 16 |
| 1990–91 | First League | 36 | 14 | 5 (4) | 17 | 35 | 49 | 32 | 10th | R32 | | | (Socialist Federal Republic of Yugoslavia) Goran Stojiljković | 10 |
| 1991–92 | First League | 33 | 12 | 5 (2) | 16 | 37 | 45 | 26 | 11th | R32 | | | (Socialist Federal Republic of Yugoslavia) Dejan Petković | 9 |

=== FR Yugoslavia / Serbia and Montenegro era (1992–2006) ===
| Season | Division | P | W | D | L | F | A | Pts | Pos | Cup | Player | Goals |
| Season | League | | | | | | | | | Cup | Top goalscorer | |
|---|---|---|---|---|---|---|---|---|---|---|---|---|
| 1992–93 | First League | 36 | 15 | 7 | 14 | 40 | 36 | 37 | 7th | R32 | (Federal Republic of Yugoslavia) Goran Stojiljković | 16 |
| 1993–94^{[C]} | First League | 36 | 14 | 8 | 14 | 47 | 43 | 14 | 14th | SF | (Federal Republic of Yugoslavia) Radivoje Manić | 9 |
| 1994–95^{[C]} | First League | 36 | 15 | 9 | 12 | 50 | 34 | 47 | 12th | R16 | (Federal Republic of Yugoslavia) Radivoje Manić | 19 |
| 1995–96^{[C]} | First League | 36 | 11 | 10 | 14 | 42 | 56 | 44 | 9th | R16 | (Federal Republic of Yugoslavia) Radivoje Manić (Federal Republic of Yugoslavia) S. Jovanović | 7 |
| 1996–97^{[C]} | First League | 33 | 16 | 8 | 9 | 66 | 36 | 56 | 16th | R16 | (Federal Republic of Yugoslavia) Zoran Tomić | 11 |
| 1997–98^{[C]} | First League | 33 | 14 | 12 | 7 | 49 | 35 | 69 | 17th | R16 | (Federal Republic of Yugoslavia) B. Stevanović | 8 |
| 1998–99 | First League | 24 | 4 | 7 | 13 | 21 | 44 | 19 | 16th | R32 | (Federal Republic of Yugoslavia) Bojan Milenković | 5 |
| 1999–2000 | First League | 40 | 16 | 4 | 20 | 50 | 49 | 52 | 11th | R32 | (Federal Republic of Yugoslavia) Malesija Vojvoda | 13 |
| 2000–01 | First League | 34 | 9 | 5 | 20 | 30 | 60 | 32 | 17th ↓ | R32 | (Federal Republic of Yugoslavia) Ž. Buzić | 8 |
| 2001–02 | Second League - East | 34 | 26 | 5 | 3 | 79 | 27 | 83 | 1st ↑ | R32 | | |
| 2002–03 | First League | 34 | 2 | 5 | 27 | 23 | 78 | 11 | 18th ↓ | R32 | (Serbia and Montenegro) V. Milenković | 7 |
| 2003–04 | Second League - East | 36 | 17 | 7 | 12 | 62 | 45 | 58 | 3rd | R32 | | |
| 2004–05 | Second League - Serbia | 38 | 13 | 10 | 15 | 40 | 44 | 49 | 15th | R32 | | |
| 2005–06 | First League - Serbia | 38 | 14 | 9 | 15 | 37 | 40 | 51 | 10th | SF | | |

=== Serbia era (2006–present) ===
| Season | Division | P | W | D | L | F | A | Pts | Pos | Cup | Competition | Round | Player | Goals |
| Season | League | | | | | | | | | Cup | European competitions | | Top goalscorer | |
|---|---|---|---|---|---|---|---|---|---|---|---|---|---|---|
| 2006–07 | First League | 38 | 14 | 13 | 11 | 45 | 35 | 55 | 11th | R16 | | | | |
| 2007–08 | First League | 34 | 11 | 10 | 13 | 29 | 31 | 43 | 14th ↓ | R16 | | | | |
| 2008–09 | Serbian League - East | 28 | 21 | 6 | 1 | 59 | 16 | 69 | 1st ↑ | R32 | | | | |
| 2009–10 | First League | 34 | 11 | 10 | 13 | 29 | 31 | 43 | 14th ↓ | DNQ | | | | |
| 2010–11 | Serbian League - East | 30 | 19 | 6 | 5 | 55 | 21 | 63 | 1st ↑ | PR | | | | |
| 2011–12 | First League | 34 | 20 | 7 | 7 | 52 | 28 | 67 | 1st ↑ | R32 | | | (Serbia) Ivan Pejčić | 13 |
| 2012–13 | SuperLiga | 30 | 9 | 7 | 14 | 30 | 44 | 44 | 12th | R32 | | | (Serbia) Aleksandar Jovanović | 5 |
| 2013–14 | SuperLiga | 30 | 10 | 13 | 7 | 28 | 22 | 43 | 6th | R16 | | | (Serbia) Saša Stojanović | 6 |
| 2014–15 | SuperLiga | 30 | 9 | 10 | 11 | 25 | 31 | 37 | 9th | QF | | | (Serbia) Saša Marjanović | 15 |
| 2015–16 | SuperLiga | 37 | 16 | 9 | 12 | 40 | 35 | 35 | 5th | QF | | | (Serbia) Saša Marjanović | 12 |
| 2016–17 | SuperLiga | 37 | 15 | 9 | 13 | 47 | 46 | 32 | 5th | R32 | | | (Serbia) Lazar Arsić | 11 |
| 2017–18 | SuperLiga | 37 | 18 | 8 | 11 | 63 | 51 | 37 | 3rd | R32 | | | (Serbia) Milan Pavkov | 23 |
| 2018–19 | SuperLiga | 37 | 25 | 10 | 2 | 71 | 30 | 48 | 2nd | SF | UEFA Europa League | QR2 | (Bosnia and Herzegovina) Nermin Haskić | 24 |
| 2019–20 | SuperLiga | 30 | 16 | 4 | 10 | 51 | 37 | 52 | 5th | QF | UEFA Europa League | QR1 | (Serbia) Stefan Mihajlović | 15 |
| 2020–21 | SuperLiga | 38 | 13 | 10 | 15 | 37 | 39 | 49 | 13th | R16 | | | (Serbia) Nenad Gavrić | 9 |
| 2021–22 | SuperLiga | 37 | 12 | 15 | 10 | 40 | 39 | 51 | 4th | R16 | | | (Serbia) Stefan Mitrović | 10 |
| 2022–23 | SuperLiga | 37 | 9 | 8 | 20 | 37 | 61 | 35 | 14th | QF | UEFA Europa Conference League | QR2 | (Serbia) Nikola Štulić | 10 |
| 2023–24 | SuperLiga | 37 | 11 | 8 | 18 | 40 | 48 | 41 | 12th | R16 | | | (Serbia) Vanja Ilić | 9 |
| 2024–25 | SuperLiga | 37 | 11 | 10 | 16 | 50 | 67 | 43 | 13th | QF | | | (Jamaica) Trivante Stewart | 9 |

== Notes ==
- ^{A} Between the 1988–89 and 1991–92 season drawn games went to penalties with only the shootout winners gaining a point. Figures in brackets in the drawn games column represent points won in such shootouts.
- ^{B} In the 1946–47 season, Radnički was competed under the part of 14. Oktobar Niš.
- ^{C} Between the 1993–94 and 1997–98 season, the league was divided into 2 groups, A and B, consisting each of 10 clubs. Both groups were played in league system. By winter break all clubs in each group met each home and away, with the bottom four from A group moving to the group B, and being replaced by the top four from the B group. At the end of the season the same situation happened with four teams being replaced from A and B groups. The final placing are listed with a combined results of both groups.
