= Miralem =

Miralem is a Bosnian masculine given name. The name comes from Arabic أَمِير (ʾamīr) meaning "prince, commander" combined with عالم (ʿālam) meaning "world, realm". The name roughly translates to "prince of the world". People with the name include:

- Miralem Fazlić (born 1947), Bosnian footballer
- Miralem Halilović (born 1991), Bosnian basketball player
- Miralem Ibrahimović (born 1963), Bosnian footballer
- Miralem Pjanić (born 1990), Bosnian footballer
- Miralem Sulejmani (born 1988), Serbian footballer
- Miralem Zjajo (born 1960), Bosnian-Herzegovinian footballer
