= Doug Stephens =

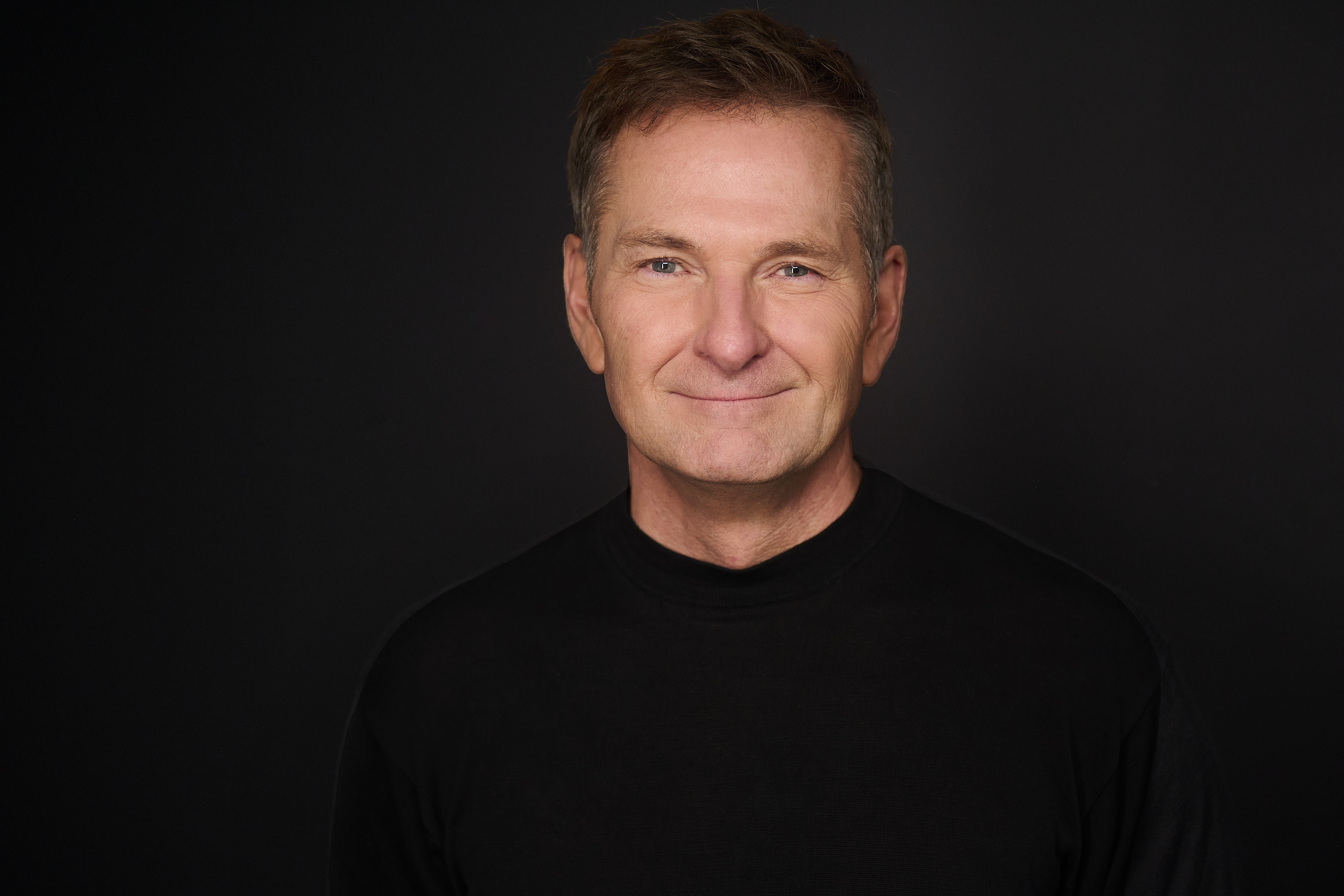
- Born: 17 April 1964 (age 62); Vancouver, British Columbia
- Occupations: Retail & Consumer Futurist, Speaker, Business Advisor, Author
- Website: Retailprophet.com

Doug Stephens (born April 17, 1964 in Vancouver, British Columbia) is a Canadian futurist, keynote speaker, author and business advisor on the future of retailing and consumerism.

== Retail Prophet ==
Following a twenty-year career in retail, including the leadership of New York City's iconic Janovic store chain, Stephens founded Retail Prophet, a consultancy specializing in the forecasting and articulation of future trends in technology, economics, demographics and consumer behavior.

== The Retail Revival ==
In 2013, Stephens authored the book The Retail Revival: Reimagining Business For The New Age of Consumerism. The book presents the case that the unique social and economic conditions leading to unimaginable growth in the retail and consumer goods sectors through the latter part of the twentieth century are giving way to radically altered demographic, economic and technological realities, yielding a new, more demanding yet vastly more positive and sustainable retail landscape.

== Reengineering Retail ==
In 2017, Stephens authored his second book Reengineering Retail: The Future of Selling in a Post-Digital World. The book examines the rapid evolution of ecommerce and changing role of physical retail spaces in the future. The book also forecasts a new future economic model for the retail industry.

== Resurrecting Retail ==
In 2021, Stephens authored his third book Resurrecting Retail: The Future of Business in a Post-Pandemic World. The book explores the impact of the pandemic on the global retail industry and consumer behavior as well as documents historic changes in the competitive landscape brought on by the crisis and the new competitive challenges and opportunities it catalyzed.

== The Future of Competitive Advantage ==
In 2026, Stephens published his fourth book The Future of Competitive Advantage: A Business Plan to Save Your Customers, Your Company and Democracy. The book explores the corrosive impact that half a century of shareholder primacy has had on society and positions the democratic values of economic fairness, organizational trust and collective human intelligence as the new and powerful pillars of competitive business advantage. .

== Media ==
Stephens is a regular business contributor for CBC Radio. He has written feature articles for Advertising Age and been quoted in Forbes, Profit Magazine, Canadian Business, The Globe and Mail, Toronto Star and a variety of other U.S. and Canadian media. He speaks internationally to both private and public sector organizations.

== Bibliography ==
- Doug Stephens (11 March 2013). The Retail Revival: Reimagining Business for the New Age of Consumerism. Wiley. ISBN 978-1-118-48967-3.
- Doug Stephens (11 April 2017). Reengineering Retail: The Future of Selling in a Post-Digital World. Figure1. ISBN 978-1927958-81-0.
- Doug Stephens (13 April 2021). Resurrecting Retail: The Future of Selling in a Post-Digital World. Figure1. ISBN 978-1773271439.
- Doug Stephens (2 June 2026). The Future of Competitive Advantage: A Business Plan to Save Your Customers, Your Company and Democracy. John Wiley & Sons. ISBN 978-1394364978.
