= Mitošević =

Mitošević (Serbian Cyrillic: Митошевић) is a Serbian surname, a patronymic derived from the Slavic given name Mitoš. It may refer to:

- Vuk Mitošević (born 1991), Serbian footballer
- Dušan Mitošević (born 1949), Serbian football manager and former player
