= Janović =

Janović (Serbian Cyrillic: Јановић) is a Serbian surname and Janovic is a Czech and Slovak surname. Both are patronymic surnames derived from the given name Jan. Notable people with the name include:

- Mlađan Janović, Montenegrin water polo player
- Nikola Janović (born 1980), Montenegrin water polo player and politician
- Tomáš Janovic
- Željko Janović (born 1963), Montenegrin footballer

== See also ==
- Janovický
- Janovics
- Janovitz
