= Zoran Vorotović =

Montenegrin footballer (1958–2024)

Personal information
- Date of birth: 12 August 1958
- Place of birth: Herceg Novi, PR Montenegro, FPR Yugoslavia
- Date of death: 4 July 2024 (aged 65)
- Height: 1.85 m (6 ft 1 in)
- Position: Left-back

Senior career*
Years	Team	Apps	(Gls)
1975–1976	Sutjeska Nikšić	23	(0)
1977–1986	Budućnost Titograd	238	(15)
1986–1987	Red Star Belgrade	8	(0)
1987–1990	Sarıyer	68	(0)
1990–1991	Spartak Subotica	7	(0)
- * Club domestic league appearances and goals

Zoran Vorotović (Serbian Cyrillic: Зоран Воротовић, 12 August 1958 – 4 July 2024) was a Montenegrin footballer who played left-back for clubs in the former Yugoslavia and in Turkey.

== Club career ==
Vorotović began playing football for local side Sutjeska Nikšić. Later, he played in the Yugoslav First League for Budućnost Titograd, Red Star Belgrade and Spartak Subotica.

In 1987, he moved to Turkey where he made 68 Süper Lig appearances in a three-year spell with Sarıyer.

== Personal life and death ==
Vorotović was seriously injured in a traffic accident on 19 December 2001.

Vorotović died on 4 July 2024, at the age of 65.
