= Slobodan Antić =

Serbian footballer

Personal information
- Full name: Slobodan Antić
- Date of birth: 13 November 1950 (age 75)
- Place of birth: Niš, FPR Yugoslavia
- Height: 1.74 m (5 ft 8 1/2 in)
- Position: Midfielder

Senior career*
| Years | Team | Apps | (Gls) |
| 1969–1979 | Radnički Niš | 236 | (32) |
| 1979–1980 | Nancy | 27 | (8) |
| 1980–1981 | Radnički Niš | 27 | (4) |
| 1981–1982 | Marseille | 22 | (2) |
| Total | | 312 | (46) |
- * Club domestic league appearances and goals

Slobodan Antić (Serbian Cyrillic: Слободан Антић; born 13 November 1950) is a Yugoslav former professional footballer who played as a midfielder.

He had a spell at French side Nancy, who brought him in as a replacement for the great Michel Platini in the playmaker role.

== Honours ==
Radnički Niš

- Balkans Cup: 1975
