= Dragoljub Brnović =

Yugoslav and Montenegrin footballer (born 1963)

Personal information
- Date of birth: 2 November 1963 (age 62)
- Place of birth: Titograd, SR Montenegro, Yugoslavia
- Height: 1.74 m (5 ft 9 in)
- Position: Midfielder

Senior career*
Years	Team	Apps	(Gls)
1980–1981	OFK Titograd	13	(0)
1981–1988	Budućnost Titograd	183	(12)
1988–1989	Partizan	27	(4)
1989–1992	Metz	89	(3)
1993	Örgryte IS	5	(0)
1994	Metz	6	(0)
1994–1996	Aris Bonnevoie	37	(4)
Total		360	(23)

International career
1982–1985	Yugoslavia U21	5	(0)
1988	Yugoslavia Olympic	3	(0)
1987–1990	Yugoslavia	25	(1)
- * Club domestic league appearances and goals

Dragoljub Brnović (Cyrillic: Драгољуб Брновић; born 2 November 1963) is a Montenegrin former professional footballer who played as a midfielder.

== Club career ==
In his country, Brnović played for OFK Titograd, Budućnost Titograd, and Partizan, winning the Yugoslav Cup with the Crno-beli in the 1988–89 season. He subsequently moved to France and joined Metz. Brnović also played professionally in Sweden and Luxembourg before retiring from the game.

== International career ==
Internationally, Brnović earned 25 caps for Yugoslavia at full level, from 1987 to 1990, scoring once. He was a member of the national team at the 1990 FIFA World Cup In addition, Brnović represented Yugoslavia at the 1988 Summer Olympics.

== Personal life ==
His younger brother, Branko, also represented Yugoslavia internationally. They played together for their hometown club Budućnost Titograd in the 1987–88 season.

== Honours ==
Partizan

- Yugoslav Cup: 1988–89
