= Žarko Vukčević =

Montenegrin footballer

Personal information
- Date of birth: 20 December 1957 (age 68)
- Place of birth: Herceg Novi, SFR Yugoslavia
- Position: Forward

Youth career
- –1975: Budućnost Titograd

Senior career*
Years	Team	Apps	(Gls)
1975–1985	Budućnost Titograd	207	(36)
1985–1987	Zonguldakspor	68	(16)
1987–1988	OFK Titograd		
1988	Lovćen		
- * Club domestic league appearances and goals

Žarko Vukčević (born 20 December 1957) is a former Montenegrin football forward who played in Yugoslavia and Turkey.

== Career ==
Born in Herceg Novi, Vukčević moved to Titograd at a young age and started playing football for the youth side of FK Budućnost Titograd. In 1975, he joined the club's senior side and competed in the Yugoslav First League for nine seasons.

He transferred to Zonguldakspor before the 1985–86 season, playing two seasons with the club in the Süper Lig. He returned to Yugoslavia and played one season for OFK Titograd and the following half season with FK Lovćen before retiring.

After his playing career ended, Vukčević became a director of FK Budućnost.
