= Željko Janović =

Montenegrin footballer

Personal information
- Full name: Željko Janović
- Date of birth: 20 January 1963 (age 63)
- Place of birth: Titograd, PR Montenegro, FPR Yugoslavia
- Height: 1.85 m (6 ft 1 in)
- Position: Forward

Youth career
- Budućnost Titograd

Senior career*
Years	Team	Apps	(Gls)
1981–1990	Budućnost Titograd	186	(45)
1990–1992	Salamanca	59	(18)
1992–1994	Istres	61	(15)
1994–1995	Penafiel	27	(9)
1995–1996	Gil Vicente	30	(4)
1996–1997	Moreirense	19	(4)
Total		382	(95)
- * Club domestic league appearances and goals

Željko Janović (Serbian Cyrillic: Жељко Јановић; born 20 January 1963) is a Montenegrin former professional footballer who played as a forward.

== Career ==
Between 1981 and 1990, Janović played for Budućnost Titograd, alongside the likes of Dejan Savićević and Predrag Mijatović, amassing 186 appearances and netting 45 goals in the Yugoslav First League.
