= Dejan Lukić =

Yugoslav footballer

Personal information
- Full name: Dejan Lukić
- Date of birth: September 28, 1965 (age 61)
- Place of birth: Belgrade, SFR Yugoslavia
- Position: Forward

Senior career*
Years	Team	Apps	(Gls)
1988–1989	Radnički Niš	48	(11)
1990	Budućnost Titograd	11	(1)
1990–1991	Borac Banja Luka	29	(10)
1991–1992	Lokeren	1	(0)
- * Club domestic league appearances and goals

Dejan Lukić (born 28 September 1965 in Belgrade) is a Yugoslav retired football player, from the 1980s and 1990s.

Lukić played for several clubs in Yugoslavia and Belgium. As a result of the mistake he's listed as a former KV Kortrijk player. The truth is that Dušan Lukić played for Kortrijk during the 1980s.
