= Miralem Zjajo =

Bosnian-Herzegovinian former footballer (born 1960)

Personal information
- Full name: Miralem Zjajo
- Date of birth: 7 November 1960 (age 65)
- Place of birth: Jajce, FPR Yugoslavia
- Height: 1.79 m (5 ft 10 1/2 in)
- Position: Midfielder

Senior career*
Years	Team	Apps	(Gls)
–1982	Elektrobosna Jajce		
1982–1985	Iskra Bugojno	59	(3)
1985–1987	Red Star Belgrade	4	(0)
1986–1987	→ Chicago Sting (loan)	12	(7)
1987–1988	Valenciennes	11	(1)
1988–1990	Chiasso		
- Locarno
- Verscio
- * Club domestic league appearances and goals

Miralem Zjajo (born 7 November 1960) is a Bosnian-Herzegovinian retired footballer best known for being subject of a player registration and contract ownership controversy in 1985. The entire protracted series of events became known in Yugoslavia as the 'Zjajo case' (slučaj Zjajo).

== Club career ==
Born in Jajce, SR Bosnia and Herzegovina, he begin playing in the local club Elektrobosna Jajce. Early in his career, Zjajo played for NK Iskra Bugojno in the Yugoslav Second League. In summer 1985 Zjajo will become the main figure in a major controversy. First he signed a contract with NK Dinamo Zagreb and played the pre-season matches with them, however Iskra made a complain to the Football Association of Yugoslavia and the contract was declared invalid. FK Partizan also made an attempt to sign him, however it was Red Star Belgrade that brought him that summer to their squad. He played in the 1985–86 UEFA Cup matches with Red Star, however it would be in the Yugoslav First League match that he played for Red Star against FK Vojvodina (a 3–1 win for Red Star) that the controversy will start again. His former club Iskra Bugojno had made a complaint to the Yugoslav FA claiming he was still their player, and Vojvodina claimed that Red Star had no right to use Zjajo as the FA did not rule out any decision about whose player Zjajo was. By the Yugoslav FA regulation, in this case, by the chapter 79, Vojvodina should be attributed a 3–0 win as the player hasn't been released by Iskra and thus his registration with Red Star had been frozen. However, as he had played for Red Star in the UEFA Cup against FC Aarau, and the Swiss club had announced that would complaint, the case was already internationalized. UEFA asked the Yugoslav FA for clarifications and it could end with sanctions for Red Star. Because of that, the Yugoslav FA decided that Zjajo was indeed Iskra Bugojno player, which was an undeniable fact as he had active contract with them, however it decided that the matches for Red Star which he played would count and Red Star would suffer no sanctions for linning him up. He ended up returning to Iskra Bugojno, and this case is known as the only one in which an irregular player was linned-up but the results in both, UEFA Cup and domestic championship, were kept.

Zjajo spent part of the 1986–87 season playing indoor soccer in the United States as Mickey Zyayo with the Chicago Sting of the MISL. Later, he would move abroad to play in France and Switzerland.
