= Dušan Mitošević =

Serbian footballer and manager

Dušan Mitošević Душан Митошевић
Personal information
- Full name: Dušan Mitošević
- Date of birth: 17 December 1949
- Place of birth: Žitište, FPR Yugoslavia
- Date of death: 1 January 2018 (aged 68)
- Position: Striker

Senior career*
Years	Team	Apps	(Gls)
1967–1970	Mladi Radnik		
1970–1975	Smederevo	96	(42)
1975–1981	Radnički Niš	142	(48)
1981–1982	Nîmes	18	(3)
1982–1983	Radnički Niš	57	(28)
1983–1984	Iraklis	15	(7)

Managerial career
- 1986–1988: IM Rakovica
- 1988–1990: Smederevo
- 1990–1991: Jastrebac Niš
- 1991–1994: Rad (assistant)
- 1994–1996: Iraklis
- 1996–2001: Anorthosis Famagusta
- 2001–2002: AEK Larnaca
- 2002–2003: Apollon Limassol
- 2004: Zemun
- 2004–2006: Panserraikos
- 2007: APOP Kinyras
- 2008–2009: Anagennisi Karditsa
- 2009–2010: Ermis Aradippou
- 2010–2012: Aris Limassol
- 2012–2013: Pierikos
- 2013–2014: Ayia Napa
- * Club domestic league appearances and goals

Dušan Mitošević (17 December 1949 – 1 January 2018) was a Serbian football player and manager.

== Playing career ==
Mitošević was a reputable striker during his playing career. He played for FK Radnički Niš during their golden era in the Yugoslav First League during the 1975–80 and transferred to Nîmes Olympique, France where he played in 1980–81 season. He returned to FK Radnički Niš for the next two years 1981–83 to participate in the European Competitions where the club reached the third Round and the semi Finals in the UEFA Cup. His goals during these years made him top scorer in clubs’ history. The next season, he was transferred to the Greek side Iraklis Thessaloniki, where he finished his career.

== Managerial career ==
=== Iraklis ===
Mitošević after eight years of coaching in amateur leagues and as assistant coach in FK Rad, took over Iraklis, as the first significant assignment in 1994. Mitošević attacking mentality aided the club to achieve a Uefa Cup Qualification and some great records. During his two years management the club achieved a point record (62) in clubs’ pro history, the biggest GD +24 and the most wins 18 and 17 respectively in the last thirty years. The attacking oriented character was evident in the impressive numbers and scoring performances similar to the Athens big three as the team scored in 31 out of 34 home games with a remarkable average of over two goals per home game for these two periods. The team lost only one out of eight games against the city's rival (PAOK & Aris) win three and draw four times. During Mitošević second season 1995/96 Iraklis finished in the fourth place behind the Athens big three with 12 points difference from Aris and 20 points from PAOK.

=== Anorthosis Famagusta ===
In 1996 Mitošević was appointed as the manager of the Cypriot club Anorthosis Famagusta FC. He created one of the most impressive teams in the Cypriot football history. During its dominance they won four consecutive championships, three super cups and a cup. The statistics are even more convincing, as they count 98 wins, 20 draws and 12 defeats in five years in official championship games. Scoring an astonishing 2.93 goals per game or 382 goals in 130 championship games. For three consecutive seasons, the team scored more than 80 goals in over 26 games. In 1997/98 and 1998/99 held the record of the highest goal scoring and goal difference in the league history. At that time Mitošević coached some of the best players in the Cypriot football history like Ioannis Okkas, Panagiotis Engomitis, Siniša Gogić, Vesko Mihajlović, Slobodan Krčmarević, Vassos Melanarkitis, and many more. He won the Coach of the Year award in Cyprus four consecutive seasons (1997, 1998, 1999 and 2000).

=== AEK Larnaca ===
In 2001 after five years in charge of Anorthosis Famagusta, where he became one of the most successful coaches in the history of the Cypriot football, Mitošević decided to step down from his position. He moved to the other big club of the city, AEK Larnaca. During his time in AEK he improved every number compared to last years’ performance, and achieved the third best scoring performance. However, AEK ended up again in the seventh position.

=== Apollon Limassol ===
Apollon Limassol was the next station in his Cypriot career, where under his management many young players and three current national team players (Athos Solomou, Giorgos Merkis and Constantinos Makrides) started their appearances in the first team.

=== Zemun ===
In 2003/04 Mitošević returned to his home country to coach FK Zemun at the newly established Serbia and Montenegro top division, where he managed a seventh position in the 16 teams league.

=== Panserraikos ===
In 2004 Mitosević returned to Greece this time for Panserraikos, where he stayed until 2006.

=== APOP Kinyras ===
In June 2007 Mitošević was hired by APOP Kinyras in the club's second appearance at the Cypriot top division.

=== Anagennisi Karditsa ===
Then came another spell in Greece in Anagennisi Karditsa in 2008/09 season.

=== Ermis Aradippou ===
In September 2009 the Serbian manager decided to continue his career at another newly appeared club of the top Cypriot division league, Ermis Aradippou, starting the season with 1 point in the first four games. The team played attacking football and enjoyed the most successful season in its history, achieving record points in top division, most goals scored and the Brazilian striker Joeano winning the top scorer award. He was released on 15 August, three weeks before the start of the championship due to transfer policy disagreement.

=== Aris Limassol ===
The next stop for Mitošević was Aris Limassol in October 2010, where he took over the club from 12th position of the second division league and ended up winning the championship for the first time ever. The same year Aris created the biggest upset in the cup by eliminating the neighbours and the next year's champion AEL Limassol. Mitošević led the club next year to the top division when Aris beat Anorthosis for first time in their history and got the first point ever from Omonoia. He was fired two games before the end of the season.

=== Ayia Napa ===
Second time in second division, second championship for Mitošević. The Serbian coach took charge of the club in a difficult period and he managed to lead Ayia Napa in an easy championship playing attacking football and scoring over 2.5 goals per game in average.

== Death ==
Dušan died on 1 January 2018. He was 68 years old. Born in Žitište, he was survived by his wife Biljana and his daughters Maša and Ivana.

== Honours ==
- Cypriot First Division: 1997, 1998, 1999, 2000
- Cypriot Second Division: 2011, 2014
- Cypriot Cup: 1998
- Cypriot Super Cup: 1998, 1999, 2000

=== Individual ===
- Coach of the Year (Cyprus): 1997, 1998, 1999, 2000
