= Mass media in Montenegro =

The mass media in Montenegro refers to mass media outlets based in Montenegro. Television, magazines, and newspapers are all operated by both state-owned and for-profit corporations which depend on advertising, subscription, and other sales-related revenues. The Constitution of Montenegro guarantees freedom of speech. As a country in transition, Montenegro's media system is under transformation.

== History ==
The first radio station in the Balkans and South-East Europe was established in Montenegro with the opening of a transmitter situated on the hill of Volujica near Bar by Knjaz Nikola I Petrović-Njegoš on 3 August 1904. Radio Cetinje commenced broadcasts on 27 November 1944 and in 1949, Radio Titograd was formed. In 1990 it changed its name to Radio Crna Gora.

In 1957, the first TV antenna was placed on Mount Lovćen. It was able to receive pictures from Italy. RTV Titograd was established in 1963 to produce original television programmes and later became RTCG. The first broadcast by TVCG in Belgrade was a news program in 1964.

== Legislative framework ==
The legal framework of Montenegro is deemed well structured and with a formally quite high level of media protection. The constitution and law provide for freedom of speech and press. Restrictions are justified only to protect the rights of others to dignity, reputation and honour, or on grounds of public morality and national security. The law criminalizes inciting hatred and intolerance on national, racial, and religious grounds, and there have been prosecutions on these grounds. In November 2014, violation of hate speech laws was turned into a cause of possible media distribution ban.

Other relevant laws with regard to media freedom and freedom of the press in Montenegro include the Law on the Public Broadcasting Services of Montenegro, the Law on Media, the Law on Electronic Media and the Law on Access to Information. Moreover, the Electoral Law stipulates the obligation on commercial media as well as on the Radio Television of Montenegro to guarantee equal visibility to all candidates. Their implementation, though, remains inconsistent.

Publications can be established without approval and are only subject to registration with the authorities. Broadcasters need to acquire a license. Individuals can criticize the government publicly or privately without reprisal. Following the repeal of the criminal libel law in 2011, parliament enacted a law on amnesty to pardon persons convicted of defamation and insult. Yet, there remains a backlog of cases. The right to reply and the right to a correction; censorship is forbidden. Institutions must guarantee the citizens' right to access to information.

The constitution and law prohibit arbitrary interference with privacy, family, home, or correspondence without court approval or legal necessity, and prohibit police from searching a residence or conducting undercover or monitoring operations without a warrant. The government generally respects the prohibitions relating to physical and property searches, but has been less compliant regarding digital privacy.

The law requires the National Security Agency to obtain court authorization for wiretaps, but authorities reportedly use wiretapping and surveillance inappropriately against opposition parties, the international community, NGOs, and other groups without appropriate legal authority. The NGO Alternativa stated that during 2011, the ANB performed secret surveillance and data collection against 113 persons. NGOs claimed that police and the state prosecutor's office illegally monitor citizens' electronic communications and fail to account for how many people or Internet addresses they monitor.

The Constitution guarantees the right to access to information and the 2005 Freedom of Information Law entitles journalists and citizens to request public information disclosure. Yet, and the executive remains wary of disclosing information about alleged corruption cases, and several cases have been registered in which authorities did not respect the deadline defined in the law. The media regulators lack financial independence and monitoring capacity.

The Agency for Electronic Media (AEM) and the Agency for Electronic Communications and Postal Affairs (EKIP) are the two regulatory bodies, entitled with broad tasks over the sector. Although defined as independent regulatory bodies, both entities have been exposed to the accusation of not being entirely independent, a condition resulting from the indebt interference exerted by politicians over these two bodies.

=== Status and self-regulation of journalists ===
No legal definition of journalist is provided by Montenegrin law. Any person producing information for the media is deemed a journalist, whether on a contract or freelancing. Job security for journalists is lacking, and part of their salaries are often transferred by editors under-the-table to avoid accounting and taxes. Average gross salaries were around 500 euros per month (the net average wage being €475/m) and can get as low as 200 euros per month for entry-levels.

Attacks on journalists and the media are also frequent, and impunity is a concern. No responsible has been found for the 2003 murder of Duško Jovanović, former Editor-in-Chief of the daily Dan. Tufik Softic, journalist for Vijesti and Monitor was injured by an explosive device activated in front of his house in August 2013.

Unionisation is on the rise, after the establishment in 2013 of a trade union for media workers, member of the national Association of Free Trade Unions.

The 2002 Journalists’ Code of Ethics is outdated, particularly with regards to online contents. The establishment of a self-regulation framework has long stalled. In March 2012, representatives of 19 print and electronic media outlets formed a media council for self-regulation. However, some of the most influential media declined to join what they described as an excessively pro-government group. They indicated that they would form a separate self-regulatory mechanism. A group of small local media outlets from the northern region of the country established their own self-regulation council.

Only three self-regulatory bodies in the country are counted as active: the Media Self-Regulation Council, the Self-regulatory Local Press Council and the TV Vijesti Ombudsman, established in 2013. The first of them is tasked with publishing reports and deciding on appeals. It also proposes itself as a mediator between media and dissatisfied customers even when the concerned media are not among its members (although this goes against the principle of self-regulation). Observers have detected instances of political bias in its work.

Professionalism among journalists is not widespread. Ethics principles are often breached, e.g. in terms of presumption of innocence, trial outcomes, misleading titles, and discredit of competitors. Media reports are rarely balanced.

Journalists are entitled to the protection of their sources, although this is not recognised by the Code of Journalists’ Ethics. Journalists' privilege is also often not respected by public authorities. The chief editor of Dan was asked in 2012 by the state prosecutor to reveal his sources on possible instances of corruption in the previously state-owned telecom company, during a trial for revelation of state secrets.

== Media environment ==
Montenegro has a diverse media environment for a small country, with around 24 television stations, 54 radio stations, 5 daily print outlets, 3 weeklies, and 30 monthlies.

=== Public service broadcaster ===
The public broadcasting organization in Montenegro is the state-owned Radio and Television of Montenegro (RTCG/РТЦГ), comprising Radio Montenegro and Montenegro Television. RTCG is a full member of the European Broadcasting Union since the country's independence in 2006. RTCG is regulated by the Law on Public Radio-Diffusion Services, requiring it to serve the interests of all Montenegro citizen, regardless of their political, religious, culture, racial or gender affiliation.

RTCG is managed by a Council of 9 members, who are experts proposed by civil society organisations and appointed by the Parliament by simple majority. The RTCG Council appoints the Director General of the RTCG and advocates in the public interest. Although its nomination procedure should ensure the independence of the Council, the fact that some of the nominating organisations receive state funding has led the OSCE and the Council of Europe to express concern about their lack of independence from the government coalition.

RTCG is widely seen as dependent from the Government, particularly after allegedly politically motivated dismissals of journalists in 2011. RTCG does not pay a broadcasting licence fee and is financed directly from the State budget (1,2% of the budget) as well as from advertising revenues (for a limited airtime) and sales revenues. Its finances have been in trouble lately, and it edged bankruptcy in 2012, further endangering its independence credentials. RTCG's financial viability is often at risk and relies heavily on the government as its primary source of funding. RTCG's debt stock (€2.4 million) was covered by the state budget in 2014.

=== Media market ===
Electronic media should inform the national regulator (AEM) of their ownership structure. Yet, no requirement are present of disclosure to the public, which is thus often unaware of real ownership structures. Information on ownership of foreign-based entities operating Montenegrin media is also not provided.

Media in Montenegro are funded by advertising revenues, the sale of own productions and other sources. State aid funds may be distributed, in accordance to the Law on the Media, for the production of educational, cultural, or minority media. The government-appointed Commission for the Control of State Aid found no irregolarities in the distribution of such subsidies in 2012.

State advertising is distributed without clear criteria and this raises concerns. In 2012, 89% of the funds for press advertisement by Ministries went to the daily Pobjeda, majority owned by the state. The public procurement law is not properly applied to advertisement services, and data are not available on the official web-portal.

The financial crisis has hit hard on Montenegrin media, with deteriorating economic viability of private media outlets. IN TV, previously hosted the most watched news programme, closed down in 2012. Its journalists are still in court for recovering due payments. Other media are still allowed to work by the national regulator AEM, notwithstanding their debt situation, raising concerns on favoritism and political pressures. The least-developed North was particularly affected by the effects of the crisis on the media industry.

A high number of media in a small market such as Montenegro's endanger their viability and sustainability. This is particularly true for electronic media, who have higher production costs and who have to pay a broadcasting fee. Dire financial conditions are deemed conducive to self-censorship.

The process of privatisation of state-owned and local administration-owned media, launched in 2003, is proceeding slowly. The national daily Pobjeda had to be privatised by 2014 but it remained mainly state-owned for lack of interested investors. A minority share of the newspaper was also allegedly linked to Darko Šarić's mafia gang. Foreign-owned media are deemed more critical of the government, contributing to the pluralism of the media panorama in Montenegro. Yet, the market has remained rather unattractive to foreign investors. The government is deemed particularly interfering in the national broadcaster RTCG, but also private Pink M TV has been accused of serving the ruling coalition's interests.

== Media outlets ==
=== Print media ===
The print press in Montenegro uses both Latin and Cyrillic alphabets, and both Serbian and Montenegrin languages. Dailies in Montenegro include Blic Montenegro (in Latin Serbian), Dnevne Novine (in Latin Montenegrin), Dan (in Cyrillic Serbian, Pobjeda (in Latin Montenegrin) and Vijesti (in Latin Montenegrin). Periodicals include Monitor (weekly in Latin Montenegrin) and Magazin BIT (monthly in Latin Montenegrin). Local and minority newspapers include Pljevaljske Novine (Pljevlja) and Koha Javore (Podgorica, in Albanian). PCnen (Prve crnogorske elektronske novine) is the main online media. The Montenegrin news agency is the Montenegrin News Agency (MINA).

The pro-governmental newspaper Pobjeda was fully privatized in November 2014, in accordance with a 2002 law requiring the state to sell its shares, after it went bankrupt in July 2014 despite heavy state subsidies through advertising. The new owner, Media Nea, by the Greek businessman Petros Stathis, planned to merge it with its other newspaper Dnevne Novine, laying off half of the staff and establishing a new editorial board.

=== Publishing ===
The Crnojević or Obod printing house was the first printing house in Southeastern Europe; the facility operated between 1493 and 1496 in Cetinje, Zeta.

=== Radio broadcasting ===
Montenegro hosts 14 local public radio stations and more than 40 private radio stations. The state-funded national radio-TV broadcaster operates 2 radio networks: Radio Crne Gore and Radio 98; Other radio stations with nationwide coverage are Atlas Radio, Montena Radio, ProFM, Radio Antena M Radio Crne Gore, Radio Svetigora, and Russkoye Radio (Russian Radio).

=== Television broadcasting ===
Montenegro hosts 4 public and some 20 private TV stations and 1 satellite TV channel. Other privately owned television broadcast stations mostly cover the major cities in Montenegro.

The state-funded national radio-TV broadcaster Radio Television of Montenegro (RTCG) operates 2 terrestrial TV networks: TVCG 1 for news and domestic production and TVCG 2 for sport and entertainment. TVCG Sat is broadcast to Australia and New Zealand via satellite. Government opponents claim that, despite some improvement, RTCG is still controlled by the ruling political structures and that the public broadcaster clearly favors the government in its programming and reporting.

The private TV stations with nationwide coverage are RTV Atlas, TV Vijesti, Pink M, Prva crnogorska televizija, NTV Montena and MBC. Former channels include Elmag RTV, IN TV and Pro TV.

Local TV channels include RTV APR (Rožaje), RTV Nikšić (Nikšić), TV Budva (Budva), RTV Panorama (Pljevlja), TV Teuta (Ulcinj, with coverage in Bar, Podgorica too) and TV BOiN (Tuzi, covering Ulcinj and Podgorica too).

=== Cinema ===
Considering its population of about 600,000 people, Montenegro has produced a number of outstanding film directors and actors including Dušan Vukotić, the first Yugoslav Oscar winner (for the short animated film category in 1961), Veljko Bulajić, and Živko Nikolić.

=== Telecommunications ===
Montenegro has 163,000 fixed telephone lines in use, provided by Crnogorski Telekom (owned by Hrvatski Telekom), and Mtel (owned by Telekom Srbija)..

Mobile telephony has boomed, with 1.1 million lines, provided by three GSM operators: One Montenegro (owned by 4iG), Crnogorski Telekom (owned by Hrvatski Telekom) and Mtel (owned by Telekom Srbija). 3G services were introduced in 2007. At 178% Montenegro had in 2013 the second highest mobile cellular phone penetration rate in Europe, behind only Russia, and ranked 9th worldwide.

=== Internet ===
Montenegro had 373,655 internet users in 2012, or 56.8% of the population.

Internet services are provided by Crnogorski Telekom (dial-up and ADSL), M-Kabl (DOCSIS) and MTEL (WiMAX). ADSL became available in Montenegro in 2005.

There are no government restrictions on access to the Internet. Until ordered to cease doing so in March 2011, one of the country's principal Internet service providers gave police direct access to all forms of communications carried on its servers. It is unknown whether authorities made use of this access to monitor e-mail or Internet Web sites or chat rooms. There is no evidence that the government collects or discloses personally identifiable information about individuals based on the individual's peaceful expression of political, religious, or ideological opinion or belief.

== Media ownership ==
=== Transparency of media ownership ===
Transparency of media ownership refers to the public availability of accurate, comprehensive and up-to-date information about media ownership structures. A legal regime guaranteeing transparency of media ownership makes possible for the public as well as for media authorities to find out who effectively owns, controls and influences the media as well as media influence on political parties or state bodies. Transparency of media ownership in Montenegro is insufficient and poorly regulated. This is among the reasons for the creation of media clusters that polarise the media system in the country where media ownership structures are widely believed to conceal the true identify of people and interests involved in the media scene.

In general terms, media laws contains only indirect regulations of ownership transparency which are only referred to print media sector. The issue of transparency of media ownership is not therefore addressed in any media-specific and separate law. Print media are recorded in a register kept by the Ministry of Culture, but such a register, which contains also data on ownership structure, is not public and only partial data are available through the Central Registry of Commercial Entities of the Tax Administration. Furthermore, the public and media experts challenge the quality of information which are publicly available claiming that they do not refer to the actual owners and do not give the full picture of ownership structures. According to media analysts, specific regulation on transparency of media ownership should be adopted for electronic media.

=== Concentration of media ownership and media pluralism ===
==== Overview ====
There is no illegal media concentration on the Montenegrin media market, according to the provisions set forth by existing legislation. However, in practice existing antimonopoly measures and rules on media concentration are weak and insufficient. This leads to the "creation of media clusters that deeply polarise the media scene in the country". Such clusters are organised around a single editorial line, which can either support or oppose the ruling regime, and are used by political powers to propagate their political agendas and to smear their opponents. In such a polarised context, both sides have developed a network of cross-owned media outlets.

The media landscape of Montenegro is characterized by a vast and diverse array of media outlets, i.e. six national television channels, 56 radio stations, four national newspapers, one political magazine and several editions of Serbian daily papers and tabloids, which only apparently provide pluralistic views to their audiences.

The following factors contributed to these developments: lack of rules on transparency of media ownership, state advertising, delayed privatisation of state-owned media, poor effectiveness of regulatory bodies in the areas of media financing, advertising and market competition. In 2014, when the tax administration made public the financial data of media companies for the first time, it was revealed that in such an overcrowded market, only few media outlets are able to sustain their activities. Such companies are either by the state or through several advertising companies which have political and business connections and that control major segments of the advertising revenues in the market.

Measures taken to prevent media concentration have had limited effects since they failed to guarantee that news and campaigns ran by connected media are not controlled from a single centre. The online media sector is an area where potentially concentration may occur, since there is no regulation covering these media outlets.

==== Media ownership ====
In Montenegro, the process of media privatisation was completed in 2014, with more than a decade of delay. The ownership patterns in the media in Montenegro shifted from a donor-supported model, developed during the process of democratisation of media in the late 1990s, to a more interest-driven media business model, dominated by foreign capital. In 2015, two out of the four national televisions are owned by foreign companies; as for the dailies, only one out of four had local owners.

===== Regulation of media ownership =====
Rules on media ownership are established in the Media Law (2002). The main objective of such a Law was to regulated the transfer of state owned media to their new private owners, a process that in practice took a decade more than expected to be completed. As far as media concentration is concerned, regulation in cases of print media are absent. According to the experts of the South East Europe Media Observatory this represents a "serious problem". Supporters of an abandoned draft law addressing the issue of concentration feared that without specific provisions one owner could own all Montenegrin dailies. In fact, since 2014 two out of four Montenegrin dailies are owned by the same people.

In order to prevent the creation of monopolies, the Electronic Media Law (2010), prohibits for a broadcaster with national coverage to hold more than 25 percent stake in another national broadcaster or more than 10 percent stake in a news agency or daily print media with a circulation of more than 3.000 copies. The regulatory body, i.e. the Agency for Electronic Media, has on several occasions effectively intervened to prevent illegal media concentration. However, as the law covers primarily the digital media sector, the provision that would limit simultaneous ownership over two or more print media has never been introduced in legislation. The case became relevant in 2014, when the same company became the owner of two daily papers. The unregulated market of online media leaves additional rooms for concentration of media power. For instance, the abovementioned owner of two dailies has also become the owner of two influential news web portals.

To comply with the rules on concentration introduced by the Electronic Media Law in 2010, the owners had to transfer their shares. In many cases, this transfer took place from the owners to their relatives, employees and other connected persons, while the owners maintained their management position. Experts claim that "if the purpose of the law was to limit excessive control over the media, then the effects of these rules are questionable".

==== Media market ====
As far as the broadcasting sector is concerned, Montenegro has six national television channels, including two public service broadcasting channels (TVCG1 and TVCG2). The small dimension of the Montenegrin media market has constrained possible media ventures, especially in the broadcasting sector where the operating costs are high. Many local media outlets that initiated their activities in the era of democratisation in the late 1990s and 2000s went bankrupt. Many others turned to foreign investors.

Another feature of Montenegrin broadcasting market is the investment of Serbian media companies that, with no language barriers, offered programs and content produced in Serbia to the Montenegrin market.

According to the South East Europe Media Observatory, competition between the major TV channels has not produced more quality content, nor can be considered fair.

As for the print sector, is characterised by editorial polarisation of government supporters versus opponents, according to an ownership pattern which is similar to that of the television market. The most important print media are held by prominent individuals, "whose oppositional editorial policies are rivalled by foreign owned media companies close to the government". 2011 marked the entrance of Greek capital in the Montenegrin media market, through the start-up company Media Nea. For instance, in 2014 the Greek company Media Nea, which already owned Dnevne novine, bought the newspaper Pobjeda, a formerly state-owned media which went through several unsuccessful privatisation attempts during 2007-2009. The Greek investors did not have clear business interests from the acquisition of Pobjeda. Their main business interests in Montenegro lays in the tourism sector. According to the South East Europe Media Observatory, such Greek acquisitions "secured continuation of favourable editorial policy to their partners in the government".

When it comes to online media - the youngest media market which has been significantly expanded over the past years, in terms of ownership, it is connected with traditional, print media, providing them new interactive spaces for attracting more audience. Also the online media market is widely non-regulated and specific ownership rules are not in place. They are mentioned in the Electronic Media Law (2010) but, according to the Agency for Electronic Media, the law does not clearly define the scope of its jurisdiction. The Agency has started elaborating some by-laws to clarify the issue.

==== Advertising agencies ====
The media buying market in Montenegro is completely dominated by foreign agencies, in the majority of cases affiliates with Serbian companies. Experts claim that this puts the Serbian owned media in Montenegro in a favourable position. This ownership structure is also relevant as it can potentially affect the clientelistic relations between the Serbian owned media and the Montenegrin government where the former are advantaged with a favourable business environment, thanks to the weakness of legal provisions and in favour of content affirmative of the ruling party's agenda. These connections lead to the strengthening of political relationships between the current political regimes of both countries. For instance, the Serbian tabloid Informed, that entered the Montenegrin media market, has close ties with both Serbian and Montenegrin Prime Ministers, namely Vučić in Serbia and Đukanović in Montenegro. Control and influence over one part of loyal media and hostile treatments of those with opposing positions has been criticized by the 2015 report of Human Rights Watch.

== Censorship and media freedom ==
In 2015, Freedom House scored Montenegro as "partly free", with an overall score of 39. The organisation recorded the persistence of hostile official rhetoric and serious physical attacks against journalists, whose investigations and prosecutions only rarely led to convictions.

In Montenegro, reporting often lacks objectivity and professionalism, and most journalism is tabloid-style.

The financial situation of the media is dire. Journalists are underpaid and pushed to biased coverage. The crisis has taken its toll, with some 500 journalists laid off since 2011 according to the media unions.

The media landscape in Montenegro is deeply and widely politicized. A sharp division can be traced between media outlets supporting the government and those criticizing it. This trend has been reinforced in recent years. There are several attempts to reduce the influence of some media outlets on the Montenegrin public sphere. “Hard” censorship has manifested also through the exercise of violence against journalists, see, for instance, the murder of the editor-in-chief of daily Dan, Dusko Javanovic, in 2014, which as of 2016 remains unresolved, as do the majority of attacks against journalists and media property, which prompts self-censorship among media practitioners.

Much more common in recent years is soft censorship, defined as indirect, “often financial pressure, intended to weaken the capacities and even threaten the viability” of media outlets, especially those that criticize the government and the ruling party. Specifically, soft censorship refers to the attempt by government to influence media outlets through various forms of pressures, without using legal bans, open censorship of content or physical attacks against journalists. There are at least three forms of soft censorship: abuse of public funds; abuse of regulatory and inspection authorities, and paralegal pressures. In Montenegro, soft censorship is exerted mainly through financial pressure, that is to say through allocation of advertising services by public institutions to favored media outlets, selective distribution of subsidies and other state funds, paid content, and the like.

According to a 2015 report by the World Association of Newspapers and News Publishers, in Montenegro public institutions attempt to manipulate media outlets and influence editorial policies and content by selective and non transparent allocation of funds. Also, the lack of transparency in state media funding and media ownership further opens opportunities for official actors to exploit media for partisan purposes.

Montenegrin legal framework does not provide specific regulation on allocation of public funding to media. No institution is responsible for monitoring how such funds are spent and allocated. Information and public record of public spending on advertising and other forms of public funds financing media outlets are not available. This opens opportunities for government intervention in the work of Montenegrin media.

=== Attacks and threats against journalists ===
Threats and assaults against journalists, both verbal and physical, are reported constantly and are a source of self-censorship. Many cases remain open, and convictions are the exception. A new governmental commission was set up in 2012 (with a one-year, renewable mandate) to supervise investigations on violent crimes against journalists. It was tasked to investigate 14 high-profile cases between 2004 and 2014, including:

- The 2004 murder of Dusko Jovanović, publisher and editor of Dan, was reopened in February 2014.
- A 2013 bomb attack against the house of the Vijesti journalist Tufik Softic
- The December 2013 explosion in front of Vijesti’s premises saw two suspects indicted in July 2014. Previous attacks, including four Vijesti cars set on fire in July 2011, August 2011, and February 2014, remain unsolved.

Several other high-profile cases of attacks and threats against journalists have happened in the last years.

- Olivera Lakic was physically attacked on 7 March 2012; the perpetrator was sentenced to nine months for violent assault, but his motives were not investigated. Lakic had been subject to several threats after having investigated on illegal cigarette manufacturing in Mojkovac.
- In December 2013 the public TV journalist Darko Ivanovic was threatened and got his car damaged after he ran a story on privatisations. The authorities assigned him a three-month protection and charged a man, but only for robbery. The man later admitted to have been given €5 and a hamburger by the police to admit to the crime. The charges were later dropped.
- In January 2014 Lidija Nikčević, reporter for Dan, was beaten with a baseball bat in Niksic. In December 2014, five persons were sentenced to terms from 11 to 15 months for the attack.
- On 13 February 2014, for the firth time, a car owned by Vijesti was set on fire in Podgorica.

The local NGO Human Rights Action (HRA) recorded 20 cases of attacks and harassment against Montenegrin journalists between 2010 and early 2014, all of them reported to the police. HRA reported that prosecutors would, as a rule, indict perpetrators for lesser crimes, and that judges would sentence them for the minimum terms, besides failing to investigate their motives.

The European Commission's 2014 Progress Report on Montenegro contains words of concern over the possibility that old and unsolved cases of violence against journalists might soon exceed the statute of limitations. It also called upon the executive to refrain from declarations that “may be understood as intimidation” – such as the March 2014 statement by Đukanović that he would “deal with all kinds of mafia, including the media mafia.”

OSCE's Media Freedom representative Dunja Mijatovic noted how the failure to investigate attacks against journalists in Montenegro "sends a message of impunity". According to HRW, the lack of progress in the investigation of old cases "helps maintain an environment in which journalists are yet to feel confident that authorities will respond forcefully to crimes committed against media workers".

=== Political interferences ===
Contents are influenced by business and political interests of media owners. Those media that are critical of the government do not receive advertising placement from state ministries and state-owned organisations. Independent journalists still face pressures from business leaders and government officials, who often behave with blatant favoritism towards the supportive media outlets. Journalists investigating corruption are often accused by officials to "seek to harm the state".

State aids and advertisement funding are the easiest ways for government to exert pressure on the media. The 2013 EU Progress Report on Montenegro noted that their management was unlawful and that it could endanger media competition. In 2013 91% of all government advertising was allocated to the government-owned Pobjeda daily.

=== Civil defamation lawsuits ===
Newspapers remain under the threat of civil damages cases. The independent media Vijesti, Dan and Monitor have been sued and fined thousands of euros for "insulting" the Prime Minister Milo Đukanović and his family. The justice system remains inadequately prepared to deal with media-related cases, since proceedings are slow, investigations inadequate, and judges untrained.

Montenegrin law make the media liable for the knowing or reckless publication of untrue facts. Journalists have reported the use of civil defamation by authorities for political interference purposes.

- The weekly Monitor received six pending lawsuits, including one by the PM's sister, Ana Kolarevic, after they investigated her role in the privatisation of the TLC company. Kolarevic sued Monitor, Dan and Vijesti for 100,000 euros (usual lawsuits are for 10,000). The first instance court acquitted Monitor but the appeal court sent the case back for re-trial.
- Opposition newspaper Dan is "struggling with lawsuits" according to its chief editor, reporting to have paid more than 200,000 euros, mostly to Đukanović and his circle, including Ana Kolarevic. At the end of 2012 Dan had 2 million euros in lawsuits pending, including a 1 million euro lawsuit by Đukanović from 2007.

=== Smear campaigns ===
Monitor, Dan and Vijesti appear to be under a "constant barrage of criticism" from pro-governmental media, according to HRW. The state-owned Pobjeda, instead, appears to push the governmental line and to discredit critics - up to regularly calling the editor of Monitor "a prostitute". Darko Ivanovic, from the public TV, was smeared by tabloids and pro-governmental media, including TV Pink, after revealing how the police had tried to inculpate a man for the attack on his car: "it's a whole system of parallel realities set up to discredit journalists.

Montenegro's prime minister Milo Đukanović has a track record of attacking critical journalists and media outlets, smearing them as a "media mafia", claiming they are linked to organised crime, and calling them "rats", "monsters", "enemies of the state".

In November 2013 a regional journalism conference inaugurated by Đukanović included an exhibition displaying the front pages of three Montenegro dailies as examples of "bad" journalism, presenting them as enemies of the state undermining the rule of law by manipulating public opinion in the country. A Bosnian journalist was threatened and smeared by pro-governmental Montenegrin media after she published a critical article about the conference, and was later harassed in person once she returned in Bosnia too.

== See also ==
- Telecommunications in Montenegro
- Transparency of media ownership in Europe
