= List of newspapers in Montenegro =

Newspapers covering Montenegro

This is a list of newspapers and news websites published in Montenegro.

== List of publications ==
=== News websites ===
- Cafe del Montenegro (CdM), Montenegrin in the Latin alphabet
- Portal Analitika, Montenegrin in the Latin alphabet
- The Montenegro Times, first English newspaper.
- Montenegro Times, first Russian news website. See mntimes.me

=== Daily newspapers ===
- Pobjeda (English: The Victory), Montenegrin in the Latin alphabet (since 1944)
- Vijesti (English: The News), Montenegrin in the Latin alphabet (since 1997)
- Dan (English: The Day), Serbian in the Cyrillic alphabet (since 1999)
- Dnevne Novine (English: the Daily news), Montenegrin in the Latin alphabet (since 2011)

=== Weekly publications ===
- Monitor, news magazine (Montenegrin in the Montenegrin Latin alphabet)
- Arena, sports newspaper (Montenegrin in the Montenegrin Latin alphabet)
- Revija D, news magazine (Serbian in the Serbian Cyrillic alphabet)
- Objektiv, film magazine (Montenegrin in the Montenegrin Latin alphabet)

=== Monthly publications ===
- Magazin ARS, cultural magazine (Montenegrin in the Montenegrin Latin alphabet)
- Svetigora, religious and cultural magazine (Serbian in the Serbian Cyrillic alphabet)
- Matica, cultural magazine (Montenegrin in the Montenegrin Latin alphabet)
- Magazin BIT, ICT magazine (Montenegrin in the Montenegrin Latin alphabet)

== Historical publications ==
- Crnogorac, cultural and political newspaper (from 1871 until 1873)
- Glas Crnogorca, periodical newspaper (from 1873 to 1916, 1917 until 1922)
- Narodna misao, periodical newspaper (from 1906 to 1907, 1916 until 1919)
- Cetinjski vjesnik periodical political newspaper (from 1908 until 1915)
