= Telephone numbers in Montenegro =

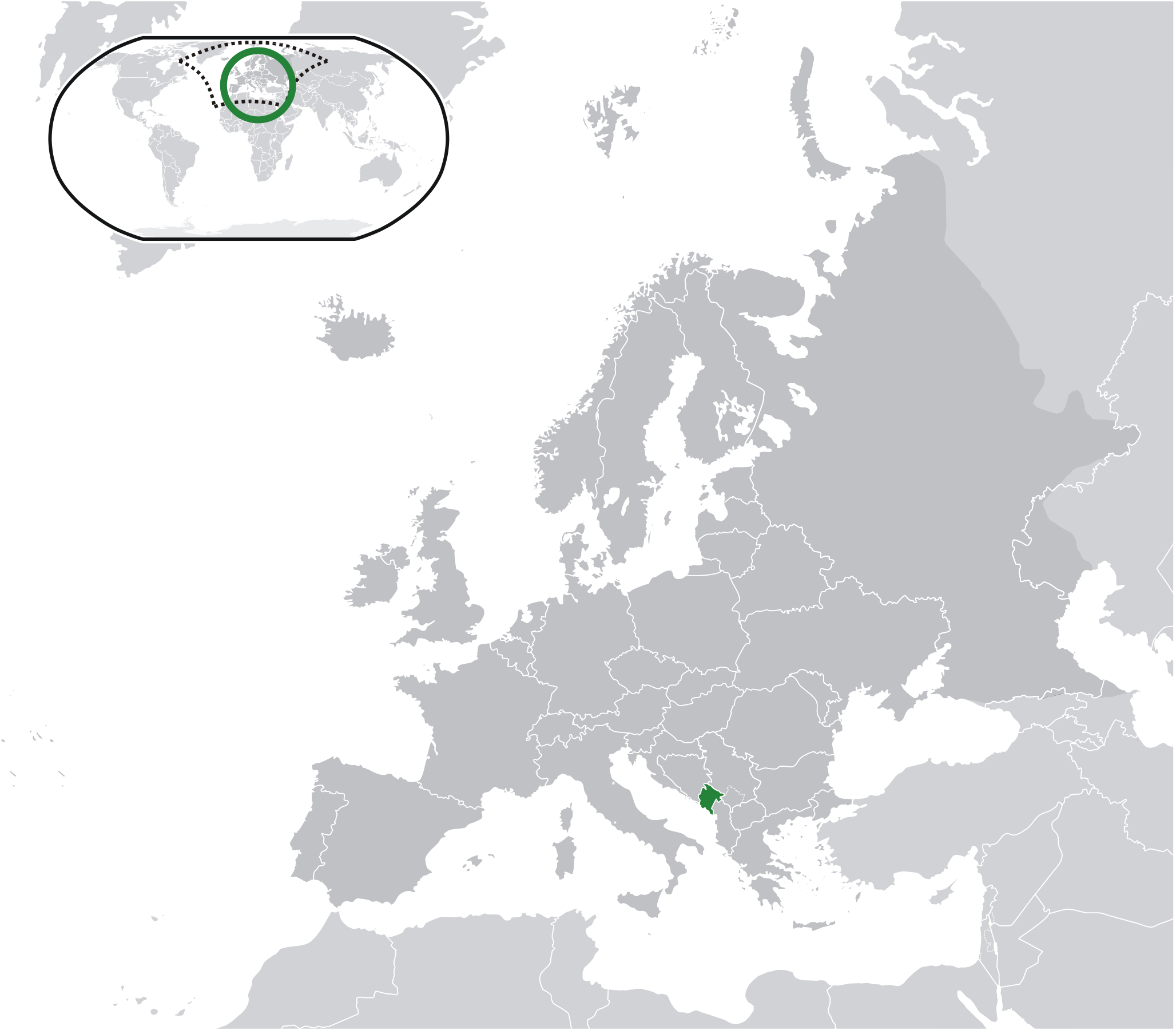
- Location of Montenegro (dark green)
- Country: Montenegro
- Continent: Europe
- Regulator: Agency of Telecommunications of Montenegro
- Numbering plan type: Closed
- Format: 0XX XXX XXX
- Country code: +382
- International access: 00
- Long-distance: 0

This is a list of dialing codes by town in Montenegro.

== History ==
Until Montenegro gained independence from Serbia and Montenegro, the nation was accessed through the international dialing code +381. The new dialing code +382 was introduced after independence and the two codes were used in parallel until February 2007, when +382 nominally became the only acceptable code. As of 1 October 2007, +381 is used only for Serbia and +382 is the only acceptable code for Montenegro.

== Dialing codes ==
=== Fixed telephony ===
Area codes have two digits after the initial '0' trunk prefix, and local numbers have six digits. The trunk prefix is omitted when calling from abroad.

The following code prefixes are used for network groups.

The old codes were used in parallel with the new codes until 1 October 2008:

| New code | Old code | Municipalities |
|---|---|---|
| 20 | 81 | Podgorica, Danilovgrad, Kolašin |
| 30 | 85 | Bar, Ulcinj |
| 31 | 88 | Herceg Novi |
| 32 | 82 | Kotor, Tivat |
| 33 | 86 | Budva, |
| 40 | 83 | Nikšić, Plužine, Šavnik |
| 41 | 86 | Cetinje |
| 50 | 84 | Bijelo Polje, Mojkovac |
| 51 | 87 | Berane, Plav, Rožaje, Andrijevica |
| 52 | 89 | Pljevlja, Žabljak |
| 77 | — | Corporate telephony |
| 78 | — | VoIP operators (including m:tel, Telemach Montenegro, etc.) |
| 80 | — | Toll-free |
| 94 | 44 | Pay-per-call |
| 95 | 45 | Pay-per-call |

VoIP – Area code 78

| Code block | Allocated operator |
|---|---|
| 100-000 to 119-999 | m:tel |
| 300-000 to 309-999 | Telemach |
| 500-000 to 504-999 | VoIP Telekom |
| 700-000 to 709-999 | Dimal Telcom |
| 800-000 to 819-999 | Dynacom |
| 900-000 to 909-999 | PTT Engineering |

=== Mobile telephony ===
- 60 – m:tel
- 63 – One
- 66 – Crnogorski Telekom
- 67 – Crnogorski Telekom
- 68 – m:tel
- 69 – One

=== Special codes ===
The following special telephone numbers are valid across the country:

==== New ====
- 112 – Emergency
- 122 – Police
- 123 – Fire brigade
- 124 – Ambulance
- 125 – Exact time
- 126 – Telegram sales over phone
- 127 – Telephone faults

==== Old ====
- 92 – Police
- 93 – Fire brigade
- 94 – Ambulance
- 95 – Exact time
- 96 – Telegram sales over phone
- 977 – Telephone faults
- 9802 – T-Com Montenegro dial-up number
- 9811 – Sports results
- 9890 – Information on ISDN services
- 0 800 800 00 – Customer service
