= Access to public information in Montenegro =

Access to public information and freedom of information (FOI) refer to the right of access to information held by public bodies also known as "right to know". Access to public information is considered of fundamental importance for the effective functioning of democratic systems, as it enhances governments' and public officials' accountability, boosting people participation and allowing their informed participation into public life. The fundamental premise of the right of access to public information is that the information held by governmental institutions is in principle public and may be concealed only on the basis of legitimate reasons which should be detailed in the law.

In Montenegro, access to information is a right guaranteed by the Constitution and regulated under the law. Montenegro first adopted the Law on Free Access to Information in 2005; in 2013 a new law entered into force, providing a better standard of protection for freedom of information than the previous legal act. However, despite some positive developments achieved with the adoption of the new Law, Montenegro still has problems with its implementation.

Recently, Montenegro started the process of reforming the current law: a draft proposal was formulated by the Culture of Ministry in 2016 following some pressure from the European Union to align Montenegrin legislation with EU standards.

== Legal framework ==
The Constitution of Montenegro states, in Article 51, that everyone shall have the right of access to public information held by state authorities and organisations exercising public functions. Furthermore, the 2013 Law on Free Access to Information establishes a precise procedure for obtaining public information. The law entitles any natural or legal person the right to access information held in any form by state and local authorities, public companies and other entities which exercise public functions. Public authorities have 15 working days for deciding on the disclosure of a required information.

The new law introduced a new supervisory body, called Agency for the Protection of Personal Data and Free Access to Information which works on the appeal process of freedom of information requests. Another positive development in the 2013 law is the introduction of fines to be imposed upon public bodies which fail to fulfill with their duties with regard to access to information.

== Access to public information in practice ==
According to the 2016 European Commission Progress Report on Montenegro, the law on Access to public information lack effective monitoring and supervision. According to the newspaper Vijesti, the experience of journalists and NGOs in the country shows that, despite FOI legal provisions, in practice it is difficult to get information of public importance.

In the last years the proportion of requests refused by public authorities in Montenegro improved from 24% in 2014 to 18% in 2015. Also, the 2016 budget of the Agency for the Protection of Personal Data and Access to Information was increased by 50%. The limited capacity and resources of the Agency was an issue of concern for some NGOs advocating for access to information.

In 2015, out of a total of 4.434 requests for access to information, the information requested was not provided in 805 cases. The Agency for Personal Data Protection and Free Access to Information received a total of 1.431 complaints in 2015. The majority of cases received by the Agency concerned administrative silence: in these cases the request remained unanswered.

The majority of FOI requests, around 70%, are filed by NGOs, among which stands the NGO MANS. This data shows the low awareness and knowledge by the general public of the right of access to information and its legal provisions. In the majority of cases applicants are get the required information with large delays, beyond the time frame established by the law, and often after having filed a complaint to the Ombudsbam.

Another issue of concern is that court decisions on cases concerning access to information are not effectively enforced. The report of the EC also points out that in some cases public authorities in Montenegro seem to abuse the possibility of declaring requested documents confidential in order to avoid their disclosure. Indeed, according to the NGO MANS, the law includes a series of unnecessary reasons for exceptions for limiting disclosure. The formulation of the exceptions enshrined in the law seems to be too vague and too general, thus giving room for public institutions to interpret it in a way that restricts access to information.

Another reason of concern is the high percentage of requests that remain unanswered.

According to the Balkan Investigative Reporting Network (BIRN), problems in realizing the right of access to public information arise in particular when journalists and NGOs seek information about the privatization process or seek information that could potentially reveal cases of corruption or illegal activity. According to the NGO MANS, the respect of the law on access to public information is particularly problematic when it comes to make public information concerning enterprises where the State owns the majority of shares.

The EC Progress Report recommends to enhance the implementation of the law especially in corruption-prone cases.

== See also ==
- Access to public information in Europe
- Freedom of information
- Freedom of information laws by country
- Transparency of media ownership in Europe
- Media of Montenegro
- Transparency of media ownership in Montenegro
