= Darko Šuković =

Montenegrin journalist

Darko Šuković (Cyrillic: Дарко Шуковић, born in Pavino Polje), is a Montenegrin journalist. He is the owner and editor in chief at Radio Antena M and at the news website Portal Antena M. He is also the editor and host of the TV talk show Živa istina.

== Career ==
He graduated with a law degree from the University of Law in Podgorica.

His career as a journalist started 1988 at Radio Titograd (now Radio Crne Gore). During 1990 he became the editor in chief of the magazine Krug, the first independent political newsletter in Montenegro. In 1991 he started working as a journalist at the weekly magazine, the Monitor.

From 1994–1996 he was the editor in chief at Antena M, the first independent news radio station in Montenegro. From 1998 to 2001 he was the deputy chief editor at Televizija Crne Gore. In October 2001 he returned to Antena M, as CEO, editor in chief and owner.

In 2016 he founded the online news platform Portal Antena M.

== Živa istina, talk show ==
Šuković is writer and host of TV talk show named Živa istina. The broadcasting of Živa istina commenced in 2002, first on TV IN, then TV Atlas, and from 2016, on TV Prva.
