= Živa istina =

- Country: Montenegro
- Broadcast area: Montenegro
- Network: TV Prva (Montenegro), Antena M
- Headquarters: Podgorica

Ownership
- Owner: Darko Šuković

History
- Launched: March 2002

Links
- Website: Živa istina

Živa istina (eng. translatated Whole truth) is political talk show in Montenegro. Occasionally, guests are scientists, artists, sportsmen, as well. The editor and host is Darko Šuković.

From March 2002 to April 2012, Živa istina has been broadcasting on TV IN. Next seasons were simultaneously shown on TV Atlas and TV Prva, and from September 2017 it is broadcast only on TV Prva (Montenegro).

From the very beginning, Živa istina is produced by Antena M, which broadcasts the talk show through its radio program. The new air term of Živa istina is Sunday from 14 P.M.

There is almost no significant politician from the former SFRY who was not a guest in the Živa istina (Milan Kučan, Stjepan Mesić, Raif Dizdarević, Haris Silajdžić, Ejup Ganić, Milorad Dodik, Zoran Đinđić, Vojislav Šešelj, Vuk Drašković, Boris Tadić, Aleksandar Vučić, Ramush Haradinaj...)

Some of the guests in the show were: Robert Gelbard, Miroslav Lajčák, Horhe Kapetanić and each of Montenegrin political leaders.

As a matter of fact, Živa istina is the only political talk show who hosted all leading politicians of its time.
