= Filip Kovačević =

Filip Kovacevic
- Born: 6 October 1975; Kotor, Montenegro, Yugoslavia
- Occupations: Author, human rights activist, university professor
- Spouse: Olga Bachynskaya-Kovačević
- Writing career
- Genres: Essays, columns, lectures

Filip Kovačević is a Montenegrin author, human rights activist, and university professor.

== Biography ==
Filip Kovačević was born in the Montenegrin town of Kotor on the coast of the Adriatic Sea, then part of the Socialist Federal Republic of Yugoslavia. He graduated summa cum laude from the California State University, Hayward in 1997. He continued his education at the University of Missouri in Columbia, Missouri receiving a PhD in political science in 2002. He taught at the Smolny College of Liberal Arts and Sciences, the first liberal arts college in Russia from 2003 to 2005. In 2005, he returned to Montenegro and was the first person to teach political psychology and psychoanalytic theory at the University of Montenegro and hold lectures on geopolitics and its key theoretical schools. Kovačević has been invited to lecture on contemporary psychoanalytic and critical social theory at the universities in Russia, Ukraine, Romania, Bulgaria, Hungary, Austria, Serbia and the United States. He writes geopolitical essays and commentaries for various print and digital media.

Since his return to Montenegro, Kovačević has been one of the leading intellectual figures campaigning for democratic reforms, the rule of law, and the protection of human rights. He has been sharply critical of the ruling oligarchy, its abuse of Montenegrin state resources and persecution of political opponents as well as its servile foreign policy. The only Montenegrin independent political weekly Monitor frequently conducts interviews with Kovačević on the issues of political and social importance. The Montenegrin daily newspaper Vijesti publishes Kovačević's columns. The Viennese newspaper Die Presse published an article which examines Kovacevic's views of the Montenegrin democratic process. According to the article, Kovačević believes that "in Montenegro, the wall of political repression has not yet fallen". He has also been cited as an expert on Montenegrin politics by the Southeastern European Times and Der Standard. He has frequently aired his views on TV. Kovačević is seen as one of the key advocates of the Montenegrin military neutrality and against the entrance of Montenegro into the North Atlantic Treaty Organization. He is a close associate of the former foreign minister of Montenegro Miodrag Lekić, who was the leader of the Democratic Front, the main opposition political alliance in Montenegro. Kovačević is the chairman of the Movement for Neutrality of Montenegro.

The Montenegrin sociologist and writer Milan N. Popović has made Kovačević into one of the main protagonists in his novel Ibrahim 2044-1994: Kratki roman o čovjeku i Bogu.

== Commentators and critics ==
The American author and university professor Ellie Ragland has stated that Kovačević's book Liberating Oedipus? Psychoanalysis as Critical Theory presents "a compelling critique of liberation theories, starting with Freud and Marx and going up to Alain Badiou... This book is a tour de force and necessary reading for anyone engaged in the contemporary study of politics and critical theory. The New Zealand sociologist Chamsy el-Ojeili wrote a detailed review of Kovačević's book for the journal of academic sociology Thesis Eleven. Liberating Oedipus? has also been cited in master's and doctoral theses on psychoanalysis as critical, social theory.

The Croatian philosopher Lino Veljak has written that Kovačević's study of the ideas of the French philosopher Michel Onfray represents "an important contribution to the affirmation of the values of the Enlightenment". This study was also positively reviewed by the theater director and art critic Zlatko Paković in the Serbian daily newspaper Danas. Kovačević has also published three other books and a dozen of essays and articles. His works have been translated into English, German, French, Russian, Bulgarian, and Turkish. He is one of the few Montenegrin authors whose work can be found in the libraries of the best American universities.

== Selected works ==
- Geopolitics of the Balkans and Beyond: What do Russia, China, and the United States Want? (Kindle E-Books, 2015).
- Teoretičari klasične geopolitike: Ciklus predavanja [Theorists of Classical Geopolitics: Lectures] (Centar za gradjansko obrazovanje, 2014).
- Marcuse in Yugoslavia, Radical Philosophy Review, Vol. 16, No. 1, 205–222, 2013.
- Masochism in Political Behavior: A Lacanian Perspective, International Journal of Applied Psychoanalytic Studies, Vol. 8, No. 1, 58–73, 2011.
- Nihilismus der Macht in Montenegro: von Dubrovnik bis Afghanistan in Sprich gunstig mit dem Balkan, eds. Vedran Džihić and Herbert Maurer, Atelier, 2011.
- Lakan u Podgorici: Ciklus predavanja [Lacan in Podgorica: Lectures] (Centar za gradjansko obrazovanje, 2010).
- Montenegrin Counter-Lustration, 1991–2009 (with Milan Popovic) in Conflict and Memory: Bridging Past and Future in South East Europe, eds. Wolfgang Petritsch and Vedran Džihić, Nomos, 2010.
- No Pasaran: Zbirka Tekstova, 2007–2009 [No Pasaran, Collection of Texts, 2007–2009] (Biro Konto, 2010).
- Montenegro and the Politics of Postcommunist Transition: 1990 to 2006, Mediterranean Quarterly: A Journal of Global Issues, Vol. 18, No.3, 72–93, 2007.
- Liberating Oedipus? Psychoanalysis as Critical Theory (Lanham, MD: Lexington Books, 2006).
