= Telecommunications in Serbia and Montenegro =

The state of Serbia and Montenegro ceased to exist in 2006. The following articles cover telecommunications in the successor states:

- Telecommunications in Serbia
- Telecommunications in Montenegro
