= Montenegro–Taiwan relations =

- Montenegro: Taiwan

Montenegro–Taiwan relations are foreign relations between Montenegro and Taiwan. Montenegro does not officially recognize Taiwan, instead recognizing the People's Republic of China as the one official government of China. Relations between Montenegro and the PRC began in 2006. However, Montenegro still maintains unofficial relations with Taiwan.

== History ==
Between 1918 and 2006, Montenegro was part of Yugoslavia, in which time its international relations were handled by Yugoslavia. Yugoslavia recognized the PRC as the sole official government of China. This policy remained in place following the breakup of Yugoslavia and establishment of Serbia and Montenegro. However, there were unofficial ties, such as trade agreements in the 1980s, which led to Yugoslavia as being labeled one of the most pro-Taiwan communist countries. While Taiwan typically ignored the Balkans as a potential diplomatic and economic partner, Yugoslavia was often the exception.

In the late 90s, Montenegro began to drift away from Serbia's foreign relation policies. For a brief time in 1999, the country considered establishing diplomatic relations with Taiwan, but this didn't come to pass.

In 2011, Montenegro and Taiwan established visa-free entry. This was due in part to the European Union cancelling Taiwanese visas. However, during the process, Montenegro reiterated its stance on Taiwan, stating that the PRC was the one government of China.

In September 2018, Montenegrin officials visited Taiwan to discuss bilateral relations. Following outcry by China, Montenegro apologized and emphasized that it solely recognizes the PRC's claim to China.

In June 2020, a joint police investigation between Montenegro and Taiwan led to 92 people being arrested in Montenegro for fraud, organized crime, and human trafficking. This followed an investigation in late 2019 and early 2020 between the two countries. The incident featured Taiwanese nationals committing fraud in Montenegro. Property was also confiscated in Taiwan. China tried to be involved in the case for extradition, but were unsuccessful due to the involvement of Taiwan.

In March 2024, Montenegrin newspaper Vijesti published an interview in which Liu Shih-chung, Taiwanese representative to Hungary, stated that Taiwan was an independent country. Following the interview, China released a statement demanding that it be retracted. However, Vijesti refused. During the interview, Liu also invited the Montenegrin government and industry representatives to attend Taiwan’s 2024 Intelligence Community Forum.
