= Boštjan Nachbar =

Slovenian basketball player (born 1980)

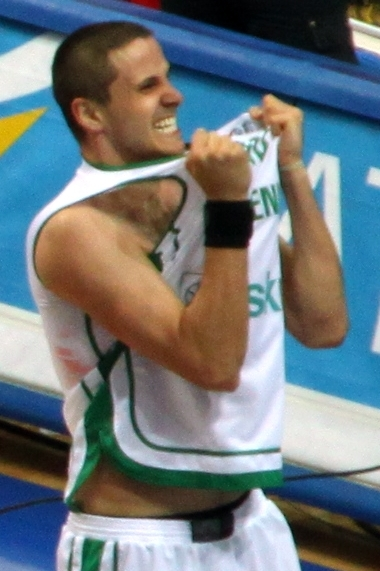
- Nachbar with Slovenia in 2009

Detroit Pistons
- Title: Scout
- League: NBA

Personal information
- Born: July 3, 1980 (age 46) Slovenj Gradec, SR Slovenia, Yugoslavia
- Listed height: 6 ft 9 in (2.06 m)
- Listed weight: 221 lb (100 kg)

Career information
- NBA draft: 2002: 1st round, 15th overall pick
- Drafted by: Houston Rockets
- Playing career: 1997–2017
- Position: Small forward / power forward
- Number: 9, 7, 10, 34

Career history
- 1997–1998: Union Olimpija
- 1998–1999: Maribor Ovni
- 1999–2000: Pivovarna Laško
- 2000–2002: Benetton Treviso
- 2002–2004: Houston Rockets
- 2004–2006: New Orleans Hornets (Note: During the 2005–06 and 2006–07 seasons, the team was known as the New Orleans/Oklahoma City Hornets during their temporary relocation to Oklahoma City due to Hurricane Katrina.)
- 2006–2008: New Jersey Nets
- 2008–2009: Dynamo Moscow
- 2009–2011: Efes Pilsen
- 2012: UNICS Kazan
- 2012–2013: Brose Baskets
- 2013–2015: FC Barcelona
- 2015–2017: Sevilla

Career highlights
- Liga ACB champion (2014); Spanish Supercup champion (2015); German BBL champion (2013); German Supercup winner (2012); German BBL All-Star (2013); All-Russian League First Team (2009); TBSL All-Star (2011); 2× Turkish Super Cup winner (2009, 2010); All-EuroCup First Team (2009); Italian Supercup winner (2001); 2× Slovenian League All-Star (1999, 2000); 2× Nike Hoop Summit (1999, 2000); Slovenian League champion (1998); Slovenian Cup champion (1998)
- Stats at NBA.com
- Stats at Basketball Reference
Medals
Representing Slovenia
FIBA Europe U-20 Championship
| Gold medal – first place | 2000 Macedonia | National Team |

Boštjan "Boki" Nachbar (born July 3, 1980) is a Slovenian former professional basketball player. A 2.06 m forward, he spent most of his career between the National Basketball Association (NBA) and the EuroLeague. Nachbar helped lead the Slovenian national basketball team to a fourth place at EuroBasket 2009.

== Professional career ==
=== Europe ===
Nachbar started his professional career by joining the Olimpija Ljubljana basketball club in the 1997–98 season. He played with Olimpija in Europe's top-level competition the EuroLeague, where he averaged 7 points and 2 rebounds per game. In the 2000–01 season he signed with Benetton Treviso basketball club, as the youngest Italian League player. With Benetton, he averaged 4 points and grabbed 2 rebounds in the EuroLeague. In the next season, he helped Benetton get to the Final Four of the EuroLeague, as he improved his statistics to 13 points and 4 rebounds per game. In his best game of the season, against Idea Slask Wroclaw, he scored 28 points, hitting 6 three-pointers. He won the Italian League championship and the Italian Supercup in 2002.

=== NBA ===
Nachbar was selected by the Houston Rockets as the 15th overall pick in the 2002 NBA draft. He played for the Rockets for three seasons, but only averaged about 10 minutes per game. In 2004, he went to the New Orleans Hornets, where he averaged about 8 points in 21 minutes per game. During the 2004–05 NBA season, he scored 21 points against his former team, the Rockets, which was a career high. In the 2005–06 season, however, he had a difficult time getting off the bench once again was traded to the New Jersey Nets just before the trading deadline in exchange for Marc Jackson, Linton Johnson, and cash considerations. He had a great season with New Jersey as the team's 6th man, making many contributions to the club before they lost in the Eastern Conference semis to the Cleveland Cavaliers.

Nachbar's final NBA game was played on April 16, 2008, in a 94–105 loss to the Boston Celtics where he recorded 11 points, 1 assist and 1 block.

=== Return to Europe ===
On July 20, 2008, Nachbar returned to Europe when he signed a 3-year €9.6 million euros net income contract with the Russian Superleague club Dynamo Moscow, giving him one of the most expensive contracts in European pro basketball history. The contract also included opt out clauses after each season. He averaged 16.1 points, 4.8 rebounds, 2.2 assists, and 1.4 steals in Europe's second-level competition, the EuroCup, during the 2008–09 season.

Nachbar opted out of his contract with Dynamo Moscow on May 17, 2009. In July 2009, he signed a 2-year contract with a team option for the second year with the Turkish League club Efes Pilsen. He averaged 6.7 points and 1.9 rebounds per game in the EuroLeague in the 2009-10 season. In his second year with Efes, Nachbar improved his stats in the EuroLeague to 8.3 points and 2.8 rebounds. On June 24, 2011, Nachbar announced via Twitter that he won't stay for a third season with the team.

Nachbar started the 2011–12 season out due to an ankle injury. After recovering from the injury, he was mentioned as a potential reinforcement for several NBA teams. After not getting a contract in the NBA, Nachbar signed with Russian League team UNICS Kazan in January 2012, until the end of the season. He wasn't able to perform well in UNICS, averaging only 3.1 PPG in the Russian league.

He joined Brose Baskets Bamberg in July 2012. He had a successful season, leading the team to the EuroLeague Top 16, finishing as EuroLeague's second best scorer with 16.1 points per game. He also helped the team regain their Basketball Bundesliga title, as they won 3–0 in the finals series against EWE Baskets Oldenburg.

On July 23, 2013, Nachbar signed a two-year deal with FC Barcelona.

On August 18, 2015, he signed a one-year deal with Baloncesto Sevilla.

On May 14, 2018, Nachbar announced his retirement.

== National team career ==
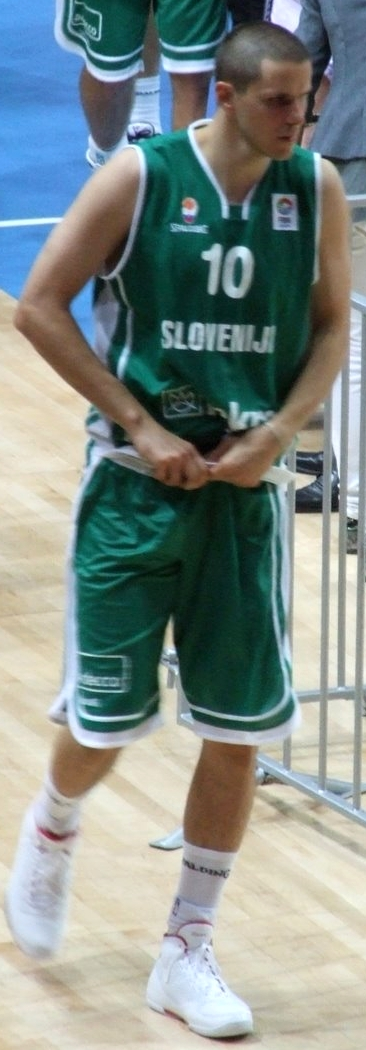
Nachbar with Slovenia at EuroBasket 2009

Nachbar was a member of the senior Slovenian national team. He participated at EuroBasket 2003, EuroBasket 2005, EuroBasket 2009 and EuroBasket 2013. During the 2005 FIBA EuroBasket, he averaged 11 points and 5 rebounds per game. He was also a member of Slovenia's national team that played at the 2006 FIBA World Championship in Japan.

He was also a member of Slovenia's national team that played at the 2010 FIBA World Championship in Turkey. EuroBasket 2013, which took place in his homeland of Slovenia, was his last one before his retirement from the national team.

== Post-playing career ==
Nachbar was hired as an international scout by the Detroit Pistons. Together with Anže Tomić and Boštjan Gorenc he runs the podcast Podrobnosti (eng. Details).

== Personal life ==
He is married and has two daughters, Tara and Ajda. His younger brother Grega is assistant coach of Premier A Slovenian Basketball League club Helios Suns.

== Career statistics ==
Legend
| GP | Games played | GS | Games started | MPG | Minutes per game |
| FG% | Field-goal percentage | 3P% | 3-point field-goal percentage | FT% | Free-throw percentage |
| RPG | Rebounds per game | APG | Assists per game | SPG | Steals per game |
| BPG | Blocks per game | PPG | Points per game | PIR | Performance index rating |
| **Bold** | Career high |

=== NBA ===
==== Regular season ====
| Year | Team | GP | GS | MPG | FG% | 3P% | FT% | RPG | APG | SPG | BPG | PPG |
|---|---|---|---|---|---|---|---|---|---|---|---|---|
| 2002–03 | Houston | 14 | 1 | 5.5 | .355 | .200 | .500 | .8 | .2 | .1 | .1 | 2.1 |
| 2003–04 | Houston | 45 | 3 | 11.5 | .356 | .365 | .724 | 1.6 | .7 | .3 | **.3** | 3.1 |
| 2004–05 | Houston | 16 | 2 | 12.8 | .349 | **.476** | .750 | 1.9 | .6 | .1 | .0 | 3.1 |
| 2004–05 | New Orleans | 55 | 4 | 20.7 | .397 | .371 | **.838** | 2.8 | **1.2** | .5 | **.3** | 8.1 |
| 2005–06 | NO/Oklahoma City | 25 | **13** | 16.2 | .339 | .298 | .694 | 2.0 | .9 | .5 | .2 | 5.0 |
| 2005–06 | New Jersey | 11 | 0 | 8.8 | .375 | .143 | .625 | 1.0 | .5 | .3 | .0 | 2.8 |
| 2006–07 | New Jersey | **76** | 1 | 20.2 | **.457** | .423 | .805 | 3.3 | .8 | .4 | **.3** | 9.2 |
| 2007–08 | New Jersey | 75 | 1 | **22.1** | .402 | .359 | .786 | **3.5** | **1.2** | **.6** | **.3** | **9.8** |
| Career | | 317 | 25 | 17.8 | .406 | .375 | .784 | 2.6 | .9 | .4 | .3 | 7.1 |

==== Playoffs ====
| Year | Team | GP | GS | MPG | FG% | 3P% | FT% | RPG | APG | SPG | BPG | PPG |
|---|---|---|---|---|---|---|---|---|---|---|---|---|
| 2004 | Houston | 5 | 0 | 8.2 | **.444** | .333 | **1.000** | 1.2 | .4 | .2 | .0 | 2.8 |
| 2006 | New Jersey | 1 | 0 | 1.0 | .000 | .000 | .000 | .0 | .0 | .0 | .0 | .0 |
| 2007 | New Jersey | **12** | 0 | **23.4** | .421 | **.375** | .955 | **2.9** | **1.5** | **.6** | **.1** | **9.9** |
| Career | | 18 | 0 | 17.9 | .423 | .373 | .963 | 2.3 | 1.1 | .4 | .1 | 7.4 |

=== EuroLeague ===
| Year | Team | GP | GS | MPG | FG% | 3P% | FT% | RPG | APG | SPG | BPG | PPG | PIR |
|---|---|---|---|---|---|---|---|---|---|---|---|---|---|
| 2000–01 | Benetton | 12 | 1 | 9.0 | .429 | .429 | .640 | 1.8 | .8 | .5 | .2 | 4.3 | 4.7 |
| 2001–02 | Benetton | 21 | **16** | 25.4 | .475 | .333 | .778 | **3.7** | **1.4** | **1.0** | .2 | 12.4 | 11.3 |
| 2009–10 | Efes Pilsen | 15 | 2 | 16.4 | .477 | .355 | .844 | 1.9 | .7 | .3 | **.5** | 6.7 | 6.7 |
| 2010–11 | Efes Pilsen | 15 | 0 | 19.3 | .418 | .379 | .822 | 2.8 | .3 | .4 | .3 | 8.3 | 6.6 |
| 2011–12 | UNICS Kazan | 7 | 0 | 14.1 | .370 | **.500** | .833 | 2.4 | .6 | .3 | .1 | 4.0 | 3.9 |
| 2012–13 | Brose Baskets | 23 | 13 | **26.7** | .431 | .370 | .800 | 3.4 | 1.1 | .5 | .4 | **16.1** | **13.8** |
| 2013–14 | Barcelona | **28** | 6 | 18.3 | .437 | .360 | .733 | 3.0 | 1.0 | .4 | .1 | 7.9 | 6.4 |
| 2014–15 | Barcelona | 24 | 2 | 12.2 | **.529** | .462 | **.923** | 2.0 | .6 | .3 | .1 | 5.3 | 5.0 |
| Career | | 146 | 40 | 18.6 | .449 | .378 | .788 | 2.7 | .9 | .5 | .2 | 8.8 | 7.8 |

== See also ==
- List of European basketball players in the United States
