= Dnevne novine =

Montenegrin daily newspaper

- Type: Daily newspaper
- Format: Berliner
- Owner: Boris Darmanović
- Editor: Boris Darmanović
- Founded: 10 October 2011
- Political alignment: Centre to centre-left politics Montenegrin nationalism Democratic Party of Socialists; Europeanism/Atlanticism
- Language: Montenegrin
- Headquarters: Podgorica, Montenegro
- Circulation: Print - est. 1.900 (2019)
- Website: www.dnevne.me

Dnevne novine (English translation: Daily newspaper) is a Montenegrin daily newspaper. Its first editor and owner is Boris Darmanović, who also owns Media Nea, a Montenegrin media agency.

== History ==
The paper was started on October 10, 2011, as the fourth Montenegrin daily newspaper (besides Pobjeda, Vijesti and Dan). It was advertised as an "anti-fascist and anti-nationalistic" newspaper, which promotes "social justice, tolerance and diversity and fights against corruption".

On May 7, 2012, Dnevne Novine became the first and, as of October 2012, only free newspaper in Montenegro. Željko Ivanović and Mladen Milutinović, owners of Vijesti and Dan, tried to sabotage the move by threatening to withdraw their papers from the main media distributors in the country (Tabacco, S Media and Štampa). Ivanović's and Milutinović's move was widely criticized by other media.

Its online edition has been available since June 2012.
