= Miodrag Perović =

Montenegrin journalist, publisher and professor

Miodrag "Miško" Perović (Serbian Cyrillic: Миодраг "Мишко" Перовић; born in Belgrade) is a Montenegrin journalist, media publisher, university professor, political activist, and businessman.

Most notable for starting various media outlets in Montenegro during the 1990s and 2000s such as FM radio station Antena M, weekly newsmagazine Monitor (1990), daily newspaper Vijesti (1997), and television station TV Vijesti (2008), Perović is a political opinion maker in Montenegro. His influence and prominence is also exerted through his family - his sister Milka Ljumović is a well known Montenegrin banker and the founder of Crnogorska komercijalna banka (CKB), which was sold to Hungarian OTP Group in late August 2006 for €105 million.

Perović was also a fierce proponent for the formation of a Montenegrin cultural society, today known as Matica crnogorska. He was a founding member and was chosen as the vice-president on 22 May 1993 during its founding assembly, but soon resigned because of Božina Ivanović's election to the position of president.

Though lauded for the anti-war stance of his media outlets during the early 1990s while armed conflicts raged throughout the Balkans as well as their pointed criticism of the pro-Milošević authorities in Montenegro led by Milo Đukanović, Momir Bulatović, and Svetozar Marović, Perović has also frequently been criticized by various public figures in Montenegro for "switching sides" in 1997 following the split in ruling DPS party and providing open support to Milo Đukanović.

== Early life ==
Born in Belgrade where his father attended professional development courses at the time, Perović's paternal family hails from Bare Radovića village in Lower Morača Valley. He left Belgrade as an infant of 3–4 months joining his father first in Kolašin. Then in Morača Monastery, and finally in Titograd where Perović spent his formative years.

He returned to Belgrade for university studies, graduating from the University of Belgrade, and later getting a MSc and PhD from the same institution.

== Career ==
In spring 1999, during NATO bombing of FR Yugoslavia, Perović's radio station Antena M refused to respect the orders under the federal state of emergency act that stipulates strict broadcasting rules under the wartime circumstances. Instead, Antena M continued carrying Western foreign service programmes such as Radio Free Europe, Voice of America, BBC, etc. contrary to Yugoslav army requests. In an editorial in his magazine Monitor, he also urged the Montenegrin government to stage a de facto coup by seizing control of the federal army bases located in the republic. Soon the Yugoslav army charged Perović on two counts - smearing the reputation of FR Yugoslavia and sabotaging the fight against the enemy - and issued a warrant for his arrest. In late April 1999, he shut down operations at both Antena M and Monitor rather than submit to military censorship and also went into hiding. On request from Montenegrin state security service chief Duško Marković, and Montenegrin president Đukanović, on May 12, 1999 Perović left the territory of FR Yugoslavia and relocated to Rome, Italy until the dust settled. After spending time in Italy and France, less than a month later, on June 6, he came back to Montenegro and couple of days later voluntarily appeared before the military court.

During the early 2000s, Perović became the vice-president of Doclean Academy of Sciences and Arts (DANU).
