= Željko Ivanović =

Montenegrin journalist, producer and human rights activist

Željko Ivanović is a Montenegrin journalist, producer and human rights activist. He was born in Nikšić.

== Education ==
After graduating from University of Belgrade's Faculty of Political Sciences, he became a journalist.

== Career ==
He was the first constant Montenegrin reporter for Nin, a newsmagazine published in Belgrade. He was a founder and one of the editors of the first Montenegrin political magazine Krug (1990) that promoted values of open society, democracy, and liberalism while nationalism was advancing in a dissolving SFRJ. After 11 issues, the magazine was no longer published. Ivanović then worked as a journalist and editor of a magazine Monitor, a respectable anti-war weekly. He was also a managing director of Monitor.

With a group of colleagues, Ivanović founded the first independent daily newspaper Vijesti, which started coming out on 1 September 1997. Over time, Vijesti became the most circulated and the most influential voice in Montenegro. Since the beginning, Vijesti went through various phases of the relationship with the authorities in Podgorica. The daily supported Đukanović’s government war with federal Milošević-led administration, but after the Belgrade Agreement was signed in March 2002, started to be more critical towards the government in Podgorica, since the Agreement postponed the referendum on Montenegrin independence.

Following the referendum in May 2006 and Montenegrin independence, Vijesti became the most vicious critic of Đukanović and his administration. Đukanović then began a long term campaign of pressures and attacks on Vijesti, in order to diminish their influence and change the editorial policy. This is how the attack on Ivanović happened on 1 September 2007, which democratic public recognized and marked as an attack on freedom of expression.

== Affiliations ==
Ivanović is a South East Europe Media Organisation (SEEMO) coordinator for Montenegro. The media organization in Vienna deals with protection of media freedoms in the Balkan and South East Europe.

Under his management in October 2003, daily Vijesti started the publishing action that counted over 3 million printed books of various content-from encyclopedias to belletristic and art books. This practice inspired other publishers from the region to follow the example of Vijesti.

== See also ==
- Filip Kovačević
- Jovo Martinović
