= Radijus Vektor =

Serbian company

- Official logo
- Native name: Радијус Вектор
- Company type: d.o.o.
- Industry: Telecommunications
- Founded: 25 May 1998; 28 years ago
- Headquarters: Belgrade, Serbia
- Key people: Predrag Lalić (Director)
- Products: Cable television Internet; Digital cable High-definition television
- Revenue: ▲€14.08 million (2018)
- Net income: ▼ (€0.07 million) (2018)
- Total assets: ▼€12.12 million (2018)
- Total equity: ▼€2.56 million (2018)
- Owner: Telekom Srbija
- Number of employees: 226 (2018)
- Website: www.vektor.net

Radijus Vektor (full legal name: Radijus Vektor d.o.o.) is a Serbian company providing cable television and high-speed Internet, headquartered in Belgrade

Radijus Vektor became Supernova in 2019 and with that they ended and shut down all the signal.

== History ==
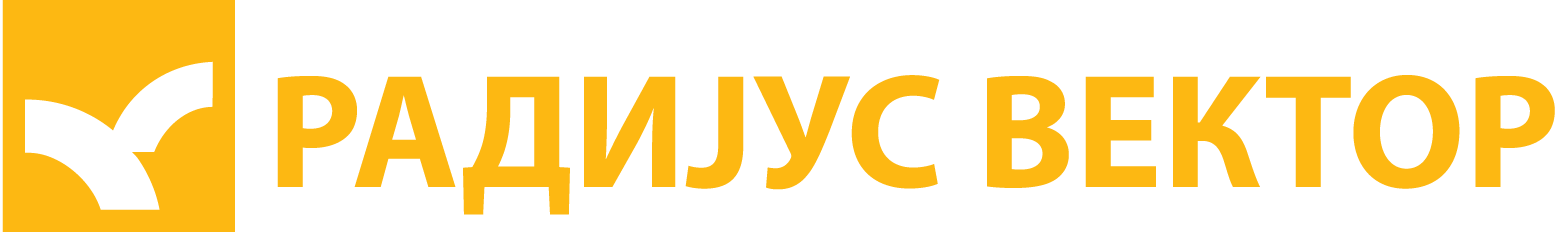
Radijus Vektor former logo

Radijus Vektor was established on 25 May 1998.

As of 2017, Radijus Vektor was the fifth-largest cable operator in Serbia, with 3% of market share. On 6 January 2019, the Serbian largest telecommunication company Telekom Srbija acquired Radijus Vektor for 108 million euros.
