= Anže Tomić =

Slovenian journalist

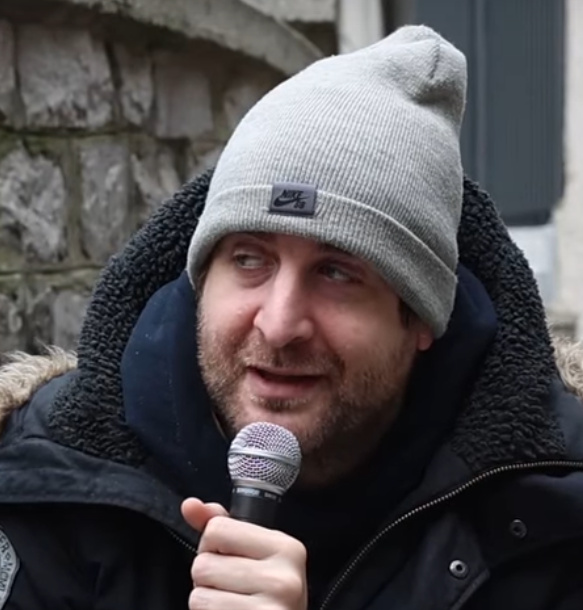
Tomić in 2023

Anže Tomić is a Slovenian journalist best known for his podcast network Apparatus. He worked for Slovenian weekly magazine Monitor covering mobile technology. He is currently working as an online web editor at RTV Slovenija's Val 202 public radio . He is known under various nicknames, most known being "Podcast Sultan", "Big Bird", and many more.
