= Jovo Martinović =

Jovo Martinović is a freelance investigative journalist in Montenegro, known for his reporting on organized crime in Europe and war criminals in the Balkans. His works appeared in The Economist, Time, Newsday and the Financial Times. Among his noteworthy projects was helping produce a Vice News documentary on a gang of jewel thieves known as the Pink Panthers. Since October 22, 2015 he has been in prison in Montenegro and has been charged with involvement in a drug trafficking ring. Rights groups such as the Committee to Protect Journalists, Reporters Without Borders and Human Rights Watch have criticized Montenegro’s government for failing to provide evidence justifying the charges or pre-trial detention for over one year.

== Works ==
Prior to his imprisonment, Martinović worked for 15 years on stories about crime and war criminals, and developed sources within criminal organizations. Martinović worked on an American Radioworks documentary, Massacre at Cuska, which focused on a 1999 attack on an ethnic Albanian village in Kosovo by a Serbian death squad that left 41 unarmed civilians dead. Furthermore, he worked for more than 10 years with Matt McAllester, a Pulitzer-winning reporter for Newsday, investigating war criminals and organized crime groups in the Balkans. In 2014, he worked with VICE on a documentary series called "Pink Panthers," about a renowned ring of Balkan thieves who are suspected of stealing hundreds of millions in gold and jewels from some of the world’s most-expensive jewelers. When he was detained, Martinović was producing a documentary film for CAPA Presse, a French production company.

== Arrest and imprisonment ==
Martinović has been accused of being part of a criminal organization and participating in a drug trafficking ring; a crime for which he was arrested on October 22, 2015. He faces up to 10 years in jail. Martinović was arrested along with 17 other suspects. On April 8, 2016 after almost six months in detention, Montenegro’s Special Prosecutor's Office filed charges against Martinović and 13 others. As of October 2016, no trial date had been set. During that operation that led to the arrests, the police seized 3.5 kilograms of cocaine, 1.5 kilos of heroin and 21 kilograms of marijuana.

Among those arrested with Martinović is a suspected former Pink Panther named Duško Martinović (no relation), who Jovo Martinović came into contact with during the production of the Vice documentary on the Pink Panthers and a 2013 documentary about the gang called "Smash and Grab". Also arrested with Jovo Martinović was Namik Selmanovic, who is believed to be an extra in the Vice series. He also worked with Jovo Martinović as a fixer on a film aired by the French station Canal Plus. When he was arrested, Martinović was working for CAPA Presse in a documentary about illegal smuggling of weapons from the Balkans into the Western Europe, "La Route de la Kalashnikov."

Jovo Martinović is suspect of "mediating in setting up of a criminal group for drug smuggling," according to the prosecution’s request for an investigation. His lawyers have complained about the length of his pre-trial detention, and their requests for bail have been denied. In addition, they say they haven’t received the documents from prosecutors that would allow them to prepare Martinović’s defence. For the moment, the only defense came from Martinović, arguing that his contact with the suspects was strictly linked to his journalistic work.

The Committee to Protect Journalists, Human Rights Watch and Reporters Without Borders wrote a letter on September 19, 2016 to Montenegrin Prime Minister Milo Đukanović in order to protest Martinović’s pretrial detention.

== Criticism of detention ==
In a letter written from Milo Đukanović, Montenegro’s Prime Minister, to Dunja Mijatović, the media freedom representative of the Organization for Security and Co-operation in Europe; Montenegro’s government said Martinović arrest was unrelated to his journalistic work. Among the international journalists who have publicly supported Martinović are. Bruce Clark of The Economist, Till Krause of Suddeutsche Zeitung, Michael Montgomery of the Center for Investigative Reporting and Philip Sherwell of the Daily Telegraph. On September 2, the International Federation of Journalists and its affiliate in Montenegro, the Trade Union of Media of Montenegro, also called for Martinović’s release.

In a broadcast interview in Germany, Milka Tadić-Mijović, a veteran media activist, talked argued that people in Montenegro’s government were afraid of Jovo Martinović. She explained that this was due to Martinović’s knowledge of criminal groups but also with state structures which are associated to them. Recently, Vijesti, an independent daily, alleged that a special prosecutor had applied pressure on other suspects to implicate Martinović.
