= TV Vijesti =

Televizija Vijesti
- Country: Montenegro
- Broadcast area: Montenegro
- Headquarters: Podgorica

Ownership
- Owner: Vijesti

History
- Launched: May 15, 2008

Links
- Website: www.vijesti.me

Televizija Vijesti is a national broadcaster in Montenegro. It is based in Podgorica.

Televizija Vijesti (TV Vijesti) aims to become the leader in informative programming in Montenegro. TV Vijesti employs around one hundred workers, including expert journalists and technical experts using the network's latest technology.

In June 2022, the United Group became the majority owner of the channel and its sister print operation.

== Programs ==
Informative programs

- Vijesti
- Bez granica
- Meteo centar
- Načisto sa Petrom Komnenićem
- Boje jutra
- Extra lifestyle
