= Cetinjski vjesnik =

Montenegrin newspaper

Cetinjski vjesnik (Cyrillic: Цетињски вјесник), later known only as Vjesnik was a Montenegrin political newspaper, published in Cetinje, then capital of Montenegrin monarchy. It was published twice a week, on Wednesdays and Saturdays, from 1908 to 1915.

== History ==
Cetinjski vjesnik was funded by the True People's Party-led Government of the Kingdom of Montenegro, to counter the then anti-Montenegrin propaganda spread by the authorities of the Kingdom of Serbia in those years.

The editors-in-chief of the newspaper were: Božo Novaković (until 1911) Lazar Čobeljić (from 1911 until 1914) and Radomir Krivokapić, until the party was abolished in 1915. The last issue of this newspaper was printed December 24, 1915.
