= NTV Montena =

Montena Radio
- Podgorica; Montenegro
- Frequencies: 96.8 MHz - Nikšić; 105.7 MHz - Danilovgrad; 105.7 MHz - Podgorica; 94.3 MHz - Boka Kotorska (Bay of Kotor); 99.4 MHz - Budva; 97.6 MHz - Bar

Ownership
- Owner: Prevalitana Holding d.o.o.

History
- First air date: 17 October 1997
- Last air date: 2013

Nezavisna Televizija Montena (NTV Montena) was a regional broadcaster in Montenegro. It was based in Podgorica. NTV Montena began broadcasting on 10 September 1998 from the studio in Podgorica, and ceased its operations at the beginning of 2015.

The station is controlled by Prevalitana Holding d.o.o., a limited-liability company that is majority-owned by Stevo Vučinić (55%), while his first cousin Đuro Vučinić has 28% stake and Miodrag Vukmanović owns the remaining 17%.

Initially, NTV Montena had a sizable viewership base in Montenegro, but the establishment of TV In in 2001, and the arrival of Pink brand through Pink M on the Montenegrin television market in 2002, eroded its market share, which is currently less than 2% nationally.

== Montena Radio ==
Montena Radio began broadcasts on 17 October 1997 from its studio in Nikšić. Montena Radio covered 450,000 listeners. It was controlled by a company called Prevalitana Holdings that holds a 36% stake in MINA, Montenegrin news wire agency.

In 2013, the radio closed down due to high debts for broadcasting. Its radio frequencies was taken over by the Montenegrin version of the Serbian TDI Radio.
