= Telekom Srbija =

Serbian telecommunication company

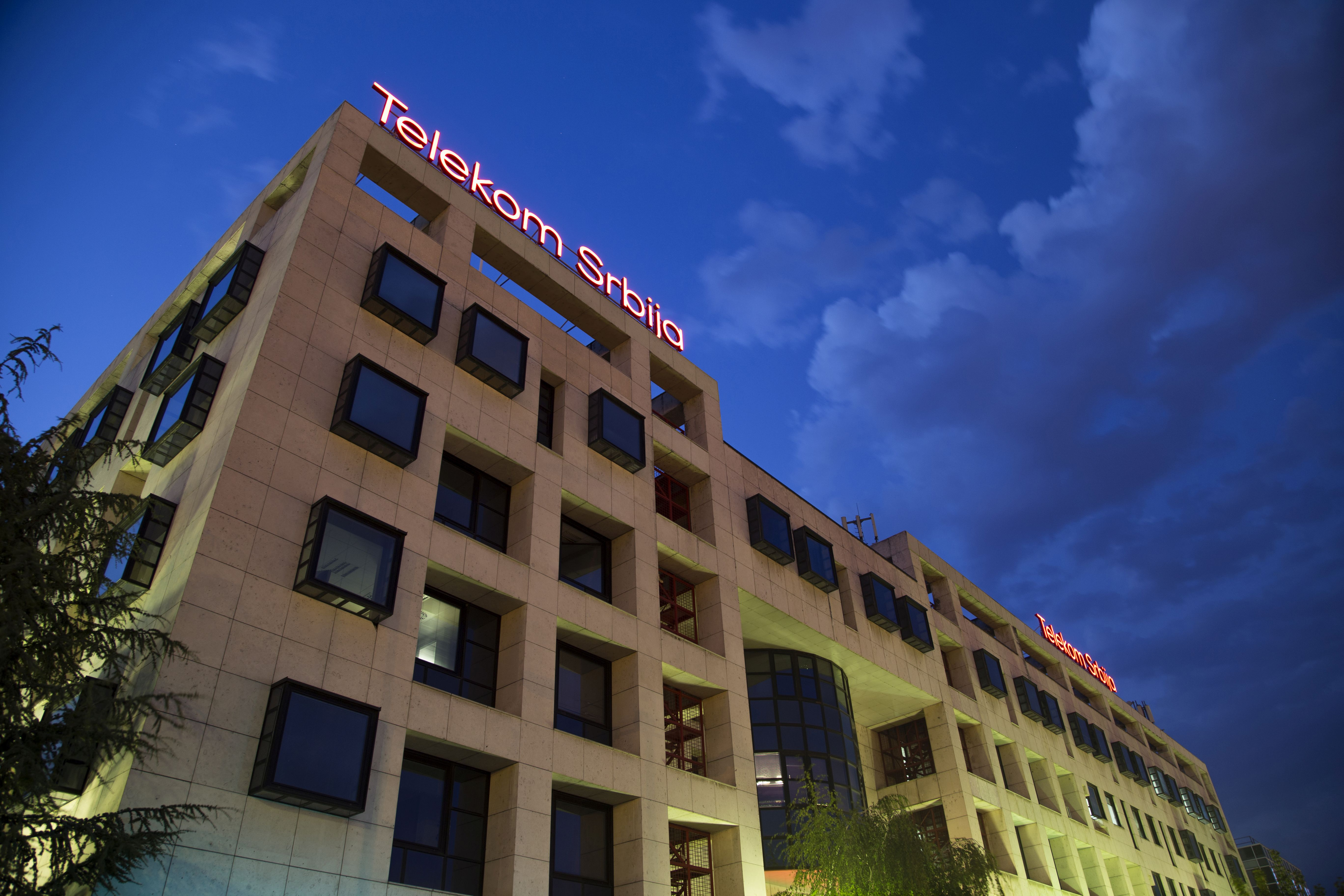
- Native name: Телеком Србија
- Type: Joint-stock company
- Industry: Telecommunications
- Founded: 23 May 1997; 29 years ago
- Headquarters: Bulevar umetnosti 16A, Belgrade, Serbia
- Area served: Serbia Mostly
- Key people: Vladimir Lučić (CEO)
- Products: Fixed telephony Mobile telephony Broadband Internet; IPTV; IT Services
- Revenue: ▲€2.278 billion (2025)
- Net income: ▲€162.22 million (2025)
- Total assets: ▲€8.938 billion (2025)
- Total equity: ▲€1.930 billion (2025)
- Owner: See Share capital structure
- Number of employees: 14,693 (2025)
- Website: telekomsrbija.com
- Footnotes; Business ID: 17162543; Tax ID: 100002887

Telekom Srbija a.d. Beograd (Serbian Cyrillic: Телеком Србија а.д. Београд) is a Serbian state-owned multinational telecommunications conglomerate holding company established in May 1997 as a joint-stock company by spinning off the telecommunications business from PTT Srbija (present-day Pošta Srbije) and headquartered in Belgrade. In April 2015, Telekom Srbija started providing most of its services in Serbia under the mts brand.

As of 2020, Telekom Srbija, including its Moja Supernova service platform, was the largest Internet provider in 2020 with a market share of 53.15%, was the second largest cable operator in 2020 with a market share of 44%, and the largest fixed-line telecommunications provider with a market share of 77.5%. It is also the largest mobile operator with a market share of 37.27%.

== History ==
Telekom Srbija's previous logo used from 1997 to 2015.

Telekom Srbija a.d. Beograd was set up in 1997, during the process of transformation of PTT sistema Srbije. In June that same year, it became the ownership of three shareholders – JP PTT Saobraćaja Srbija (present-day JP Pošta Srbije) (51%), Telecom Italia (29%), and OTE Greece (20%).

=== 2003–2015 ===
JP PTT saobraćaja Srbija (present-day JP Pošta Srbije) became the owner of 80% of the stake after purchasing the shares from the Italian partner, Telecom Italia in 2003.

In 2007, the Company regionally expanded into B-H and Montenegro. That same year, “Telekom Srpske“ a.d. Banja Luka and Društvo za telekomunikacije m:tel d.o.o. Podgorica were set up.

In August 2011, the company became the majority owner of Društvo za telekomunikacije HD WIN d.o.o. Beograd (Arena Sport TV Channels).

In January 2012, the company became the owner of 20% of the share capital which had been held by OTE Greece until then. That same year, the employees and former employees of Telekom Srbija a.d. Beograd, were presented with an opportunity to become owners of the shares.

=== 2015–present ===
On 6 January 2015, Telekom Srbija acquired a 55.8 percent of shares in the Dunav banka, becoming its majority owner. Afterwards, the bank changed its name to "mts banka".

As of 2016, it is the largest broadband internet provider (45.9% market share) and the second largest cable television provider (25.0% market share) in Serbia.

In November 2018, Telekom Srbija bought domestic cable operator "Kopernikus Technology" for 190 million euros. The transaction made public outrage in Serbia as Kopenikus' market worth at the time of purchase was several times lower than the amount it was purchased for; it was also revealed that major stakeholder in company was a close relative to ruling Serbian Progressive Party officer. Month later, Kopernikus' former owner used much of that money for the purchase of B92 and Prva Srpska Televizija, two television networks with national coverage.

On 6 January 2019, Telekom Srbija acquired domestic cable operators Radijus Vektor and "AVcom", in a transaction worth 120 million euros.

In July 2019, Telekom Srbija acquired another regional cable operator "Telemark". Later in July, Euronews and HD-WIN (majority owned by Telekom Srbija) signed a deal to launch the "Euronews Serbia" news channel.

Per 2019 financial report, the total company debt stood at 1.226 billion euros.

During the rule of Serbian Progressive Party (SNS), Telekom Srbija was under its direct political control, and over the years has financed over 30 TV stations that were close to the regime. Over the years, the company total debt increased to over 5 billion euros; per 2025 consolidated financial report, the total company debt was 7 billion euros.

== Services and business operations ==
Telekom Srbija's mobile network was established on 9 June 1997. The company launched the provision of mobile services in 1998. 3G technology and ADSL Internet services were introduced in 2006, multimedia services (IPTV) in 2008. Whereas LTE (4G) technology was introduced in 2015.

At present, Telekom Srbija provides the following services:

=== Mobile telephony ===
mts' logo was stylized as "mt:s" until 8 April 2015. This was the first variation of the "mt:s" logo, used from 2005 to 2006.

The Mobile Telephony of Serbia (mts) subdivision was created in June 1997 and started operating in August 1998.

=== Mobile network technology ===
- 2G on 900 MHz & 1800 MHz
- 3G on 900 MHz & 2100 MHz
- 4G on 800 MHz, 1800 MHz & 2100 MHz
- 5G on 700 MHz, 2600 MHz & 3500 MHz

The Mobile Telephony of Serbia signal covers 92.00% of Serbia's inhabited territory and 89.13% of Serbia's land area. Company has 1.521 active base transceiver stations (BTS). The mts mobile network codes are: 064 (international: +381 64), 065 (international +381 65) and 066 (international + 381 66).

=== Fixed-line telephony ===
Telekom Srbija formerly held a monopoly on all land-line services in Serbia until 2010, when Telenor Serbia became the second land-line operator in the country. Telekom Srbija has 2.42 million customers. It is the largest operator in Serbia on the fixed telephony market in 2018(the market share is 81.8%).

=== Digital Television ===
Telekom Srbija is the majority owner of sports television channels Arena Sport and Sport Klub which broadcast in Bosnia and Herzegovina, Croatia, Montenegro, North Macedonia and Serbia.

Mts offers cable television under the Supernova brand, digital terrestrial pay-TV under the Antena Plus brand, IPTV service under the brand Iris, as well as satellite television under the brand m:sat TV in Serbia and Montenegro.

=== Web portal ===
Mondo.rs – News portal (political, business, sports, entertainment and interviews from Serbia and around the world).

== Areas served ==
=== Austria ===
Telekom Srbija operates in Austria as a mobile virtual network operator MVNO under brand MTEL

=== Bosnia and Herzegovina ===
Telekom Srbija acquired a 65% controlling stake in Telekom Srpske for 646 million euros in 2006, outbidding Telekom Austria with an offer of 467 million euros. Telekom Srbija also broadcast cable channel Arena Sport 1,2,3 and 4.

=== Germany ===
Telekom Srbija operates in Germany as a mobile virtual network operator MVNO under brand MTEL

=== Montenegro ===
Telekom Srbija started its operations on Montenegrin market on 16 July 2007, after the company gained license as a third mobile operator as a part of the consortium with Ogalar B.V. company. The consortium offered for the license the sum of €16 million. The name for this subsidiary is m:tel, and is owned 51% by Telekom Srbija. On Montenegrin territory, Telekom Srbija also broadcasts cable channel Arena Sport 1, 2, 3 and 4.

=== North Macedonia ===
Telekom Srbija operates in North Macedonia as a mobile virtual network operator MVNO under brand MTEL

=== Switzerland ===
Telekom Srbija operates in Switzerland as a mobile virtual network operator MVNO under brand MTEL

== Share capital structure ==
As of 3 May 2012:

- The Republic of Serbia is the majority owner of the company (58.11%)
- Telekom Srbija a.d. Beograd (20%)
- Citizens of Republic of Serbia (14.95%)
- Employees and former employees of Telekom Srbija a.d. Beograd,(6.94%)

== Subsidiaries ==
Telekom Srbija a.d. Beograd shares in the capital of its related legal entities is as follows:

- "Telekom Srpske" a.d. Banja Luka – 65%
- m:tel d.o.o. Podgorica – 51%
- Telus a.d. Beograd – 100%
- HD-WIN d.o.o. Beograd – 100%
- GO4YU d.o.o. Beograd – 100%
- mts Antena TV d.o.o. Beograd – 50%
- mts d.o.o. – 100%
- YUNET INTERNATIONAL d.o.o. – 82.026%
- Kopernikus technology d.o.o. Beograd – 100%
- Preduzeće za audio i video komunikacije "AVCOM" d.o.o. Beograd – 100%
- Društvo za inženjering, trgovinu i usluge "Radijus vektor" d.o.o. Beograd – 100%
- Društvo za inženjering, trgovinu i usluge "MASKO" d.o.o. Beograd – 100%
- Preduzeće za promet, usluge, inženjering i telekomunikacije "BPP ING" Grocka – 100%
- Telemark systems d.o.o Čačak – 100%

These legal entities also constitute Telekom Srbija Group together with Telekom Srbija a.d. Beograd as the parent company.

== Gallery ==
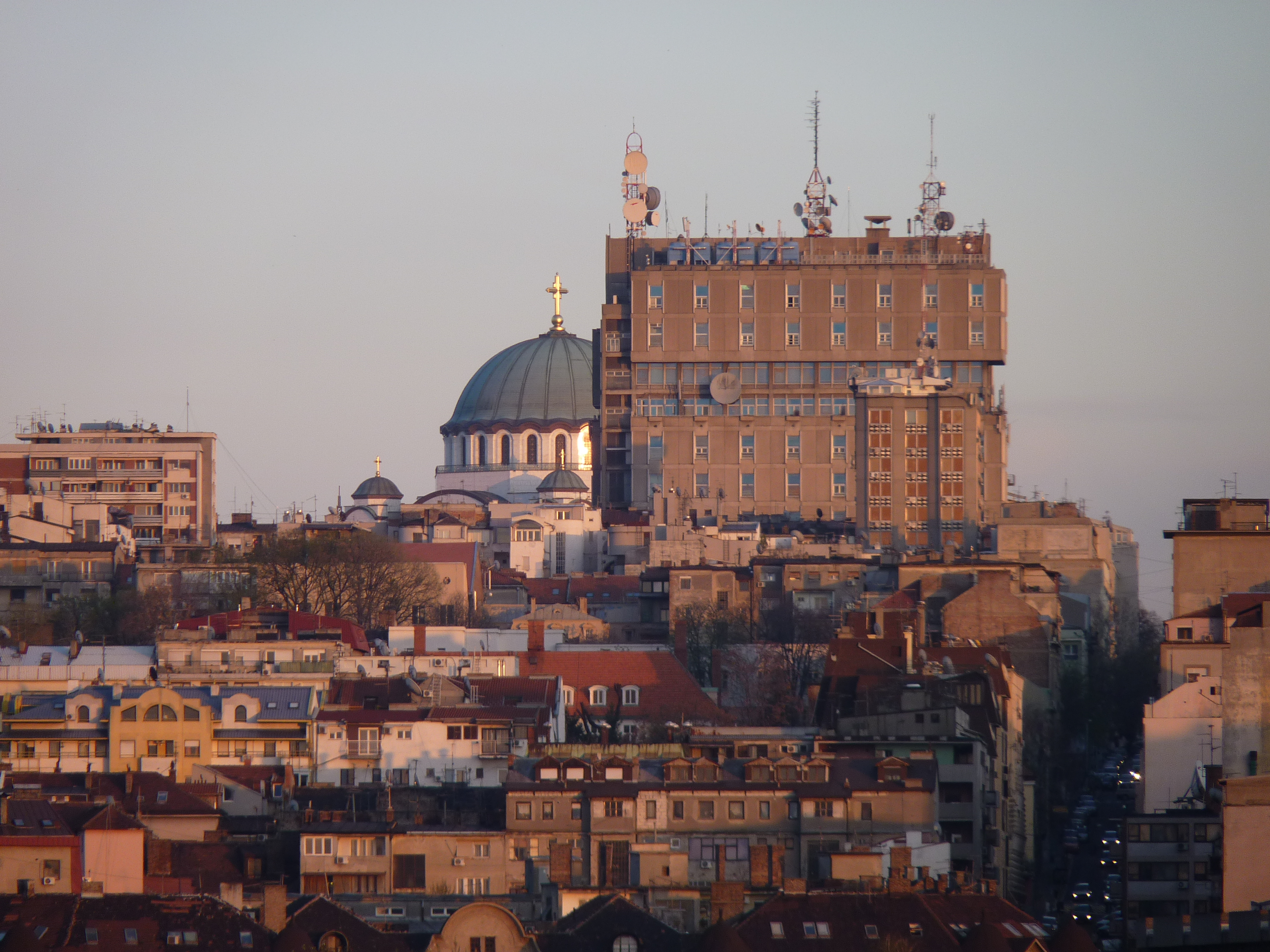
Telecommunication center

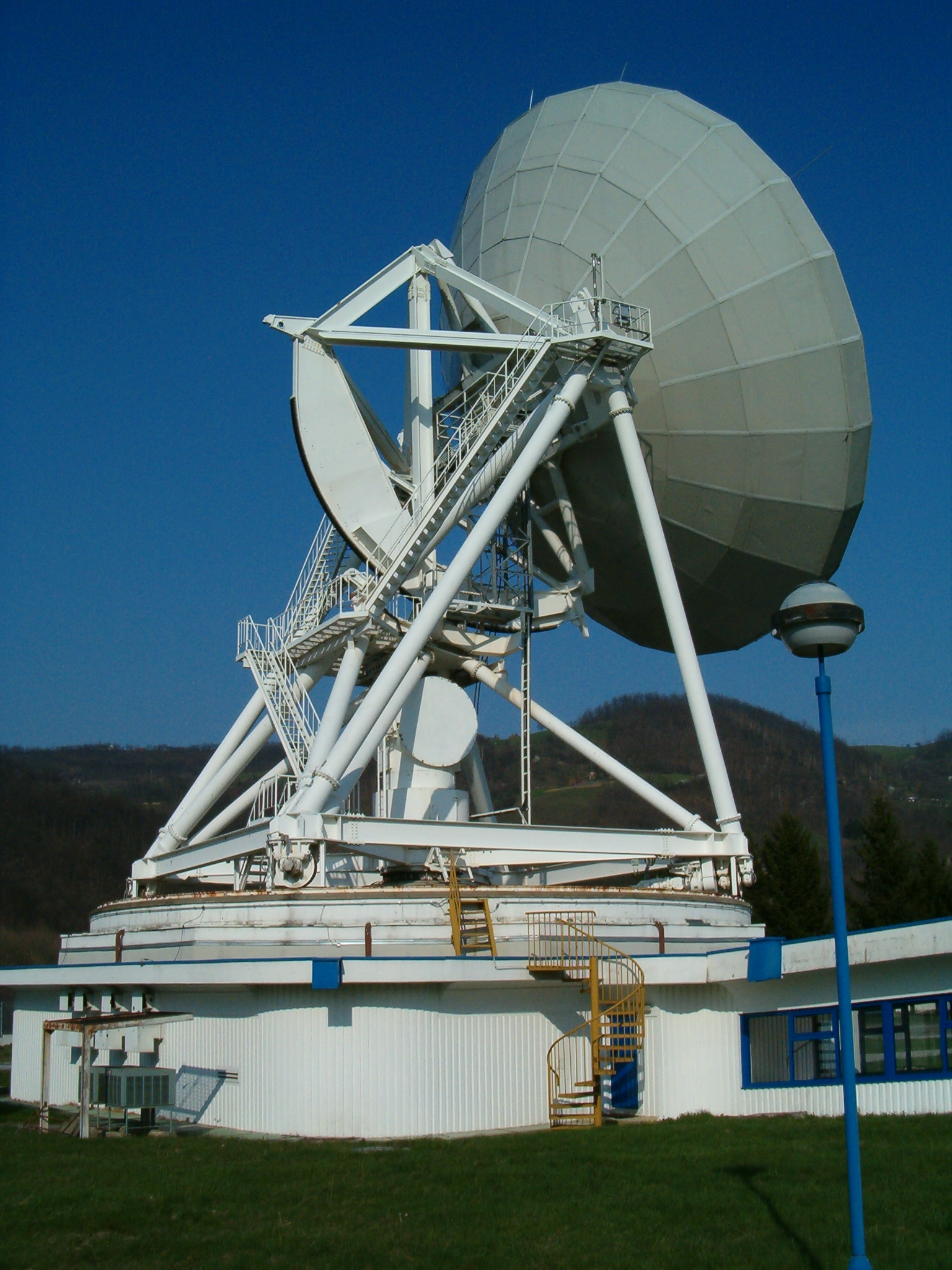
Ground satellite station

== See also ==
- Telecommunications in Serbia
