= Magazin BIT =

Magazin BIT (English: Magazine BIT) is a Montenegrin monthly magazine.

== History ==
It started out in 2006 as the first Montenegrin ICT magazine. In September 2009 it celebrated three years of publishing, thus entering its fourth year as only IT technologies-oriented paper magazine in Montenegro, with stable sources of funding and thousands of readers and subscribers.

Magazine was published by NVO "Udruženje za popularizaciju informacionih i komunikacionih tehnologija u Crnoj Gori" (English: Association for Popularization of Information and Communication Technologies in Montenegro), based in the capital, Podgorica.
