= Dan (newspaper) =

Daily newspaper published in Montenegro

Dan Дан

- Type: Daily newspaper
- Format: Berliner
- Owner: Jumedia Mont d.o.o
- Editor: Mladen Milutinović
- Founded: 31 December 1999; 26 years ago
- Political alignment: Centre-right to right-wing Anti-corruption; Moderate conservatism
- Language: Serbian (Cyrillic script)
- Headquarters: Podgorica, Montenegro
- Circulation: Print - est. 6.000 (2019); Online - 247.500/month
- ISSN: 1450-7943
- Website: dan.co.me

Dan (Serbian Cyrillic: Дан, pronounced [dâːn]; English: The Day) is a daily newspaper published in Montenegro. It took its name from the old day Cetinje monthly newspaper that was published in the old Montenegrin state at the beginning of the 20th century. As of 2009 it has the second-highest readership after Vijesti, with a share of an estimated 31.6% of the country's total readers.

== History and profile ==
=== Dan newspaper ===
The first issue of Dan appeared on 31 December 1999. Right from its start, Dan was one of the harshest critics of Milo Đukanović's regime in Montenegro. In May 2001, as Croatian magazine Nacional began a series of articles and insider interviews on state-sponsored cigarette smuggling in Montenegro under Djukanovic's regime, Dan was the only media outlet in the country to bring the details of the 'Nacional affair' to the Montenegrin public.

=== Assassination and violence ===
On 27 May 2004 Dan founder and editor-in-chief Duško Jovanović was assassinated on a Podgorica street in front of the paper's offices. Even though a prolonged police investigation led to a couple of arrests, along with an immediate suspected assassin currently on trial, the individuals behind the murder have still not been identified. It is alleged that the DPS-controlled government both sponsored and covered up the killing. Furthermore, on 11 July 2005, an unidentified male left an explosive device in front of the newspaper's Podgorica offices. However it did not detonate.

On 3 June 2006, Montenegrin state prosecutor Vesna Medenica decided to press charges against Dan columnist Dragan Rosandić due to the first post-referendum text in his regular column. The charge claims that through his piece titled Prokleta avlija ("Damned prison"), Rosandić "exposed to ridicule the peoples, national and ethnic groups of Montenegro that voted for Montenegrin independence". The charges were later dropped as unfounded.

=== Other media ===
In addition to the daily "Dan", publisher "Jumedia Mont" also includes the weekly "Revija D" newsmagazine, as well as two radio stations: "Radio D" and Radio "D plus", which in recent years have gained a lot of audience and popularity in Montenegro.
