= Radio Antena M =

Radio station in Montenegro

Antena M
Podgorica; Montenegro
- Broadcast area: Montenegro

Ownership
- Owner: Darko Šuković

History
- First air date: 1990s

Links
- Website: http://www.antenam.net

Antena M is an independent radio station and website in Montenegro.

== History ==
Founded in the early 1990s by university professor and businessman Miodrag Perović, the station was organizationally under the umbrella of his Montenegropublic company.

In September 1995, the station's place in the Montenegropublic's organizational structure got changed when it was registered within the company as a distinct entity whose managing director became Darko Šuković. On the same occasion, the same was done with Montenegropublic's other assets at the time: weekly newsmagazine Monitor and radio production studio Mouse.

The president and owner of the station is Darko Šuković, a Montenegrin journalist. Radio Antena M covers the whole territory of Montenegro.
