= Mtel (Montenegro) =

m:tel
- Type: Limited liability company
- Industry: Mobile phone operator
- Founded: April 2007
- Headquarters: Podgorica, Montenegro
- Key people: Zoran Milovanović (CEO)
- Products: Wireless, Mobile telephony, Cable Internet, Cable TV, Fixed telephone lines
- Owner: 51% Telekom Srbija; 49% Telekom Srpske
- Number of employees: 450
- Website: mtel.me

Društvo za telekomunikacije MTEL d.o.o. Podgorica, doing business as m:tel, is a telecommunications company in Montenegro. It is a 51–49% joint venture between Telekom Srbija and Telekom Srpske (Telekom Srbija owns 65% of Telekom Srpske).

== History ==
On 9 May 2007, the company obtained a licence to become the third mobile operator in Montenegro, along with a license for GSM and UMTS technologies. The company officially launched its business on 9 July 2007 using the 068 dialing prefix. Initially, the company was 51-49% joint venture between Telekom Srbija and Ogalar BV (Dutch-based company controlled by Delta Holding).

m:tel plans to invest €120 million, and eventually grow to 150 employees. Initially, its signal covered a relatively small area from Montenegrin coastline to capital Podgorica (about 30% of the country's territory). Initial goals were to have the m:tel signal available in most Montenegrin towns by September 2007. Plans to be achieved by the end of 2007 consisted of covering 90% of the country's territory and gaining 15-20% market-share in a country that at the time of m:tel's arrival had 690,000 mobile subscribers. The company announced plans to offer fixed telephony services as well as WiMax.

The company announced that it sold 12,000 prepaid packages with SIM cards during its first official day of operation.

As of the end of August 2007, Montenegin Telecommunications Agency has announced that m:tel held 12.8% of the Montenegrin mobile telephony market. Its more established competitors ProMonte and T-Mobile held 50% and 37.2%, respectively.

On October 19, 2007, m:tel announced the beginning of their fixed telephony operations in Montenegro, ending T-Com Montenegro's monopoly in the fixed telephony business. M:tel will be using the (0)78 prefix and is currently available in Podgorica. M:tel is hoping to provide fixed telephony and internet services to other cities throughout Montenegro by the end of the year.

During mid-November 2007, the company announced that its signal is present in every single one of Montenegro's 21 municipalities, accounting for the 80% of the country's populated territory, and able to reach 91% of the total population.

At the end of November 2007, Montenegin Telecommunications Agency announced that m:tel's market share in Montenegro (a market of 992,000 mobile sets at this time) increased to 22.66%. Its competitors ProMonte and T-Mobile at this time held 43.47% and 33.87%, respectively.

On February 3, 2010, Ogalar BV (Dutch-based company controlled by Delta Holding) sold its 49% share to m:tel Bosnia and Herzegovina (Telekom Srpske).
