= Monitor (magazine) =

Weekly news magazine published in Podgorica, Montenegro

- Editor-in-chief: Esad Kočan
- Categories: News magazine
- Circulation: Weekly
- First issue: October 19, 1990
- Company: Monitor Ltd.
- Country: Montenegro
- Based in: Podgorica
- Language: Montenegrin
- Website: monitor.co.me

Monitor (Montenegrin pronunciation: [mǒnitor]) is a weekly news magazine published in Podgorica, Montenegro.

== History ==
Started on October 19, 1990 by journalist Milka Tadić Mijović, media publisher Miodrag Perović and businessman Stanislav Koprivica, the magazine appeared at a time when the single-party political system in SFR Yugoslavia had been abolished and its constituent republics were preparing for multiple-party parliamentary elections.

The Socialist Republic of Montenegro was ruled by the Yugoslav Communist League's (SKJ) Montenegrin branch (SKCG); more specifically the triumvirate of Momir Bulatović, Milo Đukanović, and Svetozar Marović who had been swept into power the previous year during the anti-bureaucratic revolution, an administrative putsch within Montenegrin Communist League initiated by Slobodan Milošević and carried out with a great deal of help from the state security apparatus that he had gained control of by this time.

== Publications ==
The first issue of Monitor was printed in Sarajevo in 20,000 copies and then distributed in SR Montenegro where it sold in symbolic numbers—only couple of hundred of copies. Although the magazine listed 76 individuals as its founders (among them politicians Slavko Perović, Žarko Rakčević, Ljubiša Stanković, Dragiša Burzan, etc.), in actuality only the editor-in-chief Miodrag "Miško" Perović and main financier Stanislav "Ćano" Koprivica had actual influence on its editorial policy. Following the poor sales of the first issue, the magazine effectively went bankrupt and was only kept alive via individual donations. The subsequent eight issues were also printed in Sarajevo.

Since Koprivica also generously financed the Liberal Alliance of Montenegro (LSCG) and Social Democratic Party (SDP), Monitor was in essence another arm of the same political front. Somewhat similar in tone and political stance to other newly-launched liberal publications throughout Yugoslavia such as Belgrade's Vreme or Split's Feral Tribune, Monitor was also critical of the rising nationalism across the country, especially of the Slobodan Milošević-led authorities in SR Serbia. Furthermore, it also frequently criticized the SR Montenegro leadership, considering them to be Milošević's pawns.

As the League of Communists of Montenegro transformed into the Democratic Party of Socialists of Montenegro (DPS) in July 1991 and Yugoslavia began to disintegrate through war, Monitor adopted an anti-war stance with pointed criticism of Montenegro's involvement and effort in it through the attack on Konavle and the Siege of Dubrovnik. Managed out of a family house in Podgorica's Dalmatinska Street, the magazine intensely criticized the ruling DPS party and its leadership: Montenegrin Prime Minister Milo Đukanović, Montenegrin President Momir Bulatović as well as party's leader at the time Svetozar Marović. Its makeshift offices were even fire bombed during the Siege of Dubrovnik. During the same period, and especially following the creation of the Federal Republic of Yugoslavia after the 1992 Montenegrin referendum, Monitor was a strong supporter and advocate of Montenegrin independence, which even more aligned it politically and ideologically with LSCG and SDPCG.

By spring 1994, Koprivica mostly ended his financial support of Monitor, which is when Miško Perović took over that aspect of the magazine's operation as well. Organizationally, the magazine was under the umbrella of Perović's Montenegropublic company. Although George Soros already had a prominent part in Monitor's financing through the local branch of his newly founded Open Society Institute network, this affiliation became even more pronounced after Koprivica left.

In September 1995, the magazine's place in the Montenegropublic's organizational structure changed when it was registered within the company as a distinct entity with Željko Ivanović as its managing director. On the same occasion, the same was done with Montenegropublic's other assets: radio station Antena M and radio production studio Mouse.

By the late 1990s, most on the list of original owners signed their stake in the magazine over to Perović, who thus basically became the sole owner.

== See also ==
- Vreme, weekly news magazine based in Belgrade, Serbia
