= Vijesti =

Montenegrin daily newspaper

- Type: Daily newspaper
- Format: Berliner
- Owner(s): 4 founders (59%); Styria Medien AG (25%); MDIF (16%)
- Founder(s): Miodrag Perović; Željko Ivanović; Ljubiša Mitrović; Slavoljub Šćekić
- Editor: Srdan Kosović
- Founded: September 1, 1997
- Political alignment: Centre to centre-left Pro-Europeanism; Anti-corruption
- Language: Montenegrin
- Headquarters: Podgorica, Montenegro
- Circulation: Print - est. 2.900 (2019); Online - 6.09 mil./month
- ISSN: 1800-6264
- Website: vijesti.me

Nezavisni dnevnik Vijesti (Montenegrin pronunciation: [ʋijêːsti]; lit. 'News') is a Montenegrin daily newspaper.

The paper is published and managed by an entity called Daily Press d.o.o. - a limited liability company based in Podgorica. The company's ownership is currently split among Montenegrin partners (59%), Austrian Styria Medien AG (25%), and an independent US-based fund MDIF (16%), formerly MDLF, which has received funding from multiple investors and foundations, including Open Society Foundations.

Published under the "nezavisni dnevnik" (independent daily) mantra, the paper's editorial policy was initially very much in favour of Milo Đukanović and his government's policies and of his relations with Serbia. However, this editorial policy changed sometime after the 2006 Montenegrin independence referendum when Vijesti turned into Đukanović's critic.

On 9 May 2018, Olivera Lakić, Vijesti's investigative reporter who covers crime and corruption in Montenegro, was shot and injured in an attack outside her home in the capital, Podgorica.

== History ==
The legal and financial entity behind the paper, Daily Press d.o.o. company, was founded on November 25, 1996 and registered on December 16, 1996. The company's founding capital of $5,000 was provided by three entities: Miodrag Perović's company Montenegropublic, journalist Milka Tadić, and Slavica Popović acting on the behalf of Podgorica Tobacco Factory director Dragoljub "Mićo" Dautović.

The paper was launched on September 1, 1997 as only the second daily newspaper in Montenegro at that point with the long running state-owned Pobjeda being their only competition. Listed as the paper's owners were four individuals: Miodrag Perović, Ljubiša Mitrović, Slavoljub Šćekić, and Željko Ivanović.

At the precise time of the paper's launch, the political situation in Montenegro was fairly tense as former longtime DPS (ruling political party) allies Milo Đukanović and Momir Bulatović were in the middle of a campaign for the 1997 presidential elections. Montenegro, at the time a part of FR Yugoslavia (federal country that also consisted of Serbia), was choosing between a pro-Milošević leader in Bulatović, and Đukanović who at that time started to cautiously distance himself from his former mentor Milošević although he still favoured the idea of a unified country with Serbia. Vijesti openly supported Đukanović who eventually won the highly controversial elections and thus became the president of Montenegro.

Vijesti from November 1998: The paper often went to great lengths to be affirmative in its coverage of president Milo Đukanović even if it required leaving out key parts from foreign media reports when referencing them.

Vijesti generated plenty of criticism during the initial period from all sides of the political spectrum in Montenegro. Pro-Serbian camp saw it as an aggressive proponent of Montenegro's separation from Serbia. On the other end, the pro-independence camp (especially members and sympathizers of LSCG party) wasn't entirely happy with it either, criticizing the paper's pro-independence stance as being tailored for and by Đukanović's day to day political needs. Some (most notably LSCG leader Slavko Perović) have even claimed that the initial funds for paper's launch were in fact provided by Đukanović who needed a seemingly independent media support at a time when he was distancing himself from Milošević. Similar criticism came from journalist Nebojša Redžić who worked at Vijesti for six months - in 1999 he accused the individuals behind the newspaper of creating it "solely for the purposes of manipulating the electorate in Montenegro and steering the pro-independence voters towards Đukanović and DPS", referring to his own involvement in the paper's formation as the "biggest mistake in my career". Although occasionally critical of Đukanović and the Democratic Party of Socialists on minor municipal issues in the years to come, Vijesti firmly supported his government's policies on all the major issues such as the relations with Serbia. Furthermore, the paper ignored all the evidence and foreign reports of widespread tobacco and oil state-sponsored smuggling that took place in Montenegro under Đukanović as well as his involvement in Milošević's war efforts during the early 1990s.

=== WAZ-Mediengruppe arrives ===
During May 2002, Vijesti announced a strategic partnership with German media concern WAZ, which bought a 50% stake in Vijesti. The amount was not disclosed. On March 15, 2003 at a ceremony attended by WAZ director Bodo Hombach, the deal was officially inaugurated.

After the acquisition, the paper has slightly shifted its focus towards citizens' everyday problems.

=== 2006 Montenegrin independence referendum ===
In the dawn of 2006 Montenegrin independence referendum, Vijesti was a moderate supporter of independence, but eventually fully joined the campaign by shipping traditional Montenegrin flags, bracelets and caps with Montenegrin insignia used by pro-independence bloc, along with copies of the newspaper. Still, OSCE/ODIHR gave it the best marks among the all Montenegrin media for observing professional journalistic standards during the referendum.

Since the referendum, Vijesti has switched in a more opposing view and is greatly criticizing Milo Đukanović and his Democratic Party of Socialists (DPS).

The portier of the newspaper, Luka Đukić, was threatened to quit under allegations that something bad will happen to his family, two suspects were arrested on Monday 3 September 2007.

=== Ivanović assaulted ===
On Saturday, September 1, 2007, at around 4am, Vijesti director Željko Ivanović was approached on the street near Ribnica restaurant and severely beaten by three men, two of whom were masked. As he was being attended to in the hospital, Ivanović publicly accused DPS president Milo Đukanović's "biological or criminal family" for orchestrating the attack in an attempt to "..destroy the very last fringes of journalist freedom". Ivanović also referred to them as the people who want to control every aspect of life in Montenegro.

Milo Đukanović in turn sued Ivanović for libel and the trial began in Podgorica on November 26, 2007 under the presiding judge Nenad Otašević. Đukanović is represented at the trial by a legal team consisting of his sister Ana Kolarević and Dragoljub Đukanović, while Ivanović is represented by Branislav Lutovac and Milan Đukić.

Vijesti was the first newspaper in Montenegro to publish books like a collection of 20th century authors (on the string of other European newspapers), an anthology of Montenegrin authors (in 2006) and Pečat umjetnosti (2007), an interesting (but not original) edition of the greatest painters.

=== WAZ leaves ===
In early October 2007, after four-and-a-half years of co-ownership, German media concern WAZ sold its stake in Vijesti to the other ownership party (four individuals). In a vague public statement following the sudden decision, WAZ's representative Andreas Rudas said: "The weight of the past was too strong, and this had to be done".

Vijesti established its television division in October, 2007 and was launched throughout Montenegro on 11 May 2008.

In mid March 2009, Styria Medien AG bought 25% in the Daily Press company that oversees the publishing of Vijesti.

== Television division ==
Launched on 11 May 2008, Televizija Vijesti (TV Vijesti) aims to become the leader in informative programming in Montenegro. TV Vijesti employs around one hundred workers, including expert journalists and technical experts using the network's latest technology. Over 50 percent of the network's programming is informative, with an addition of external programming, including films and television series and diverse sports and educational programming.
