= List of radio stations in Montenegro =

The following is a list of radio stations in Montenegro.

Radio stations in Montenegro
Name	Municipality	Frequency (MHz)
Arena Radio	Bar	95.4
Arena Radio	Bijelo Polje	93.9
Arena Radio	Budva	103.4
Arena Radio	Herceg Novi	92.7
Arena Radio	Kotor	102.0
Arena Radio	Nikšić	103.6
Arena Radio	Podgorica	106.2
City Radio	Podgorica	93.3
El Radio	Podgorica	97.4
Elmag Radio	Bar	96.0
Elmag Radio	Berane	104.6
Elmag Radio	Bijelo Polje	107.2
Elmag Radio	Budva	105.3
Elmag Radio	Cetinje	97.3
Elmag Radio	Herceg Novi	96.0
Elmag Radio	Kolašin	104.6
Elmag Radio	Kotor	88.0
Elmag Radio	Mojkovac	98.5
Elmag Radio	Nikšić	106.9
Elmag Radio	Plav	99.9
Elmag Radio	Podgorica	96.0
Elmag Radio	Rožaje	90.0
Elmag Radio	Ulcinj	99.9
Gradski Radio	Podgorica	103.0
PLAY Montenegro	Bar	107.3
PLAY Montenegro	Bijelo Polje	87.9
PLAY Montenegro	Budva	88.2
PLAY Montenegro	Cetinje	100.4
PLAY Montenegro	Herceg Novi	104.6
PLAY Montenegro	Kolašin	103.0
PLAY Montenegro	Kotor	93.4
PLAY Montenegro	Mojkovac	103.4
PLAY Montenegro	Nikšić	93.9
PLAY Montenegro	Plav	100.7
PLAY Montenegro	Pljevlja	102.3
PLAY Montenegro	Podgorica	102.5
PLAY Montenegro	Rožaje	105.0
PLAY Montenegro	Ulcinj	88.4
PLAY Montenegro	Šavnik	90.9
PLAY Montenegro	Žabljak	100.7
Radio 98	Bar	89.6
Radio 98	Berane	95.3
Radio 98	Bijelo Polje	103.8
Radio 98	Budva	93.7
Radio 98	Cetinje	98.0
Radio 98	Kolašin	88.3; 99.3
Radio 98	Mojkovac	107.8
Radio 98	Nikšić	98.9
Radio 98	Plav	97.2
Radio 98	Pljevlja	98.3
Radio 98	Plužine	102.0
Radio 98	Podgorica	89.3; 105.3
Radio 98	Rožaje	94.2
Radio 98	Ulcinj	93.4
Radio 98	Šavnik	93.0
Radio 98	Žabljak	91.3
Radio Adriatic	Bijelo Polje	91.0
Radio Andrijevica	Andrievica	95.8
Radio Antena M	Bar	102.1
Radio Antena M	Budva	100.5
Radio Antena M	Herceg Novi	106.7
Radio Antena M	Nikšić	102.5
Radio Antena M	Podgorica	87.6
Radio Bar	Bar	91.8; 106.7
Radio Bar	Ulcinj	105.6
Radio Berane	Berane	88.2; 105.4
Radio Bijelo Polje	Bijelo Polje	95.5; 101.1; 105.8
Radio Budva	Bar	106.0
Radio Budva	Budva	98.7
Radio Cetinje	Cetinje	94.5
Radio Crne Gore	Bar	99.8
Radio Crne Gore	Berane	89.1
Radio Crne Gore	Bijelo Polje	94.6
Radio Crne Gore	Budva	92.2
Radio Crne Gore	Cetinje	94.9
Radio Crne Gore	Kolašin	92.1; 93.5; 94.0
Radio Crne Gore	Kotor	107.9
Radio Crne Gore	Mojkovac	101.8
Radio Crne Gore	Nikšić	88.0
Radio Crne Gore	Plav	89.9
Radio Crne Gore	Pljevlja	96.8
Radio Crne Gore	Plužine	94.5
Radio Crne Gore	Podgorica	95.5; 96.5; 97.1
Radio Crne Gore	Rožaje	89.5; 92.6
Radio Crne Gore	Ulcinj	97.3
Radio Crne Gore	Šavnik	87.6
Radio Crne Gore	Žabljak	96.1
Radio D	Bar	107.7
Radio D	Budva	103.0
Radio D	Cetinje	104.0
Radio D	Herceg Novi	100.0
Radio D	Kolašin	87.7
Radio D	Nikšić	93.4
Radio D	Podgorica	88.6
Radio D Plus	Bar	101.3
Radio D Plus	Berane	100.9
Radio D Plus	Bijelo Polje	98.8
Radio D Plus	Budva	103.8
Radio D Plus	Cetinje	93.0
Radio D Plus	Herceg Novi	105.8
Radio D Plus	Kolašin	89.7
Radio D Plus	Kotor	106.3
Radio D Plus	Nikšić	94.4
Radio D Plus	Pljevlja	107.5
Radio D Plus	Podgorica	90.2
Radio D Plus	Žabljak	88.5
Radio DRS	Bar	93.0
Radio DRS	Bijelo Polje	104.8
Radio DRS	Budva	97.1
Radio DRS	Herceg Novi	95.5
Radio DRS	Nikšić	90.3
Radio DRS	Podgorica	101.5
Radio DUX	Herceg Novi	100.8
Radio DUX	Kotor	97.4
Radio Danilovgrad	Danilovgrad	92.9
Radio Elita	Ulcinj	93.9
Radio Fatih	Berane	98.2; 106.0
Radio Fatih	Bijelo Polje	96.6
Radio Fatih	Plav	88.4; 90.9
Radio Fatih	Podgorica	92.5
Radio Fatih	Rožaje	88.6
Radio Fatih	Ulcinj	104.0
Radio Herceg Novi	Herceg Novi	90.0; 102.7
Radio Jupok	Rožaje	98.7; 102.5
Radio Kotor	Herceg Novi	107.3
Radio Kotor	Kotor	95.3; 99.0
Radio Krš	Podgorica	99.0
Radio Laki Plus	Bijelo Polje	103.0
Radio Mag	Budva	90.0
Radio Mag	Nikšić	106.3
Radio Mag	Podgorica	90.7
Radio Mojkovac	Mojkovac	92.8
Radio Nikšić	Nikšić	89.8; 92.0; 100.0
Radio Petnjica	Berane	90.7
Radio Pljevlja	Pljevlja	94.8; 101.3
Radio Rožaje	Rožaje	101.4; 104.4; 107.4
Radio S1	Bar	96.6
Radio S1	Bijelo Polje	91.6
Radio S1	Budva	89.2; 89.2
Radio S1	Cetinje	90.1
Radio S1	Herceg Novi	89.2; 96.6
Radio S1	Kolašin	101.3
Radio S1	Kotor	89.0; 89.0
Radio S1	Nikšić	102.8; 104.4
Radio S1	Pljevlja	93.2
Radio S1	Plužine	100.4
Radio S1	Podgorica	99.7
Radio S1	Ulcinj	100.6
Radio S1	Šavnik	92.5
Radio S1	Žabljak	99.9
Radio S3	Budva	106.8
Radio S3	Podgorica	107.3
Radio Star FM	Cetinje	99.4
Radio Svetigora	Bar	91.0
Radio Svetigora	Berane	106.7
Radio Svetigora	Bijelo Polje	97.9
Radio Svetigora	Cetinje	88.2
Radio Svetigora	Herceg Novi	91.5
Radio Svetigora	Kolašin	105.8; 107.0
Radio Svetigora	Kotor	105.0
Radio Svetigora	Mojkovac	105.3
Radio Svetigora	Nikšić	95.7
Radio Svetigora	Pljevlja	106.7
Radio Svetigora	Plužine	106.5
Radio Svetigora	Podgorica	104.7
Radio Svetigora	Ulcinj	106.4
Radio Svetigora	Žabljak	95.1
Radio Teuta	Ulcinj	90.4
Radio Titograd	Podgorica	101.1
Radio Tivat	Herceg Novi	90.8
Radio Tivat	Tivat	88.5
Radio Ulcinj	Ulcinj	91.3; 102.6
Radio Zeta	Podgorica	93.8
Radio Ćirilica	Nikšić	89.0; 107.5
Radio Ćirilica	Podgorica	101.9
Srpski Radio	Bar	104.7
Srpski Radio	Berane	99.8
Srpski Radio	Bijelo Polje	100.3
Srpski Radio	Herceg Novi	101.4
Srpski Radio	Mojkovac	89.0
Srpski Radio	Nikšić	91.3
Srpski Radio	Pljevlja	97.6
Srpski Radio	Podgorica	88.1
TDI Radio	Bar	97.6
TDI Radio	Berane	93.3
TDI Radio	Budva	99.4
TDI Radio	Cetinje	105.1
TDI Radio	Herceg Novi	94.3
TDI Radio	Nikšić	96.8
TDI Radio	Podgorica	105.7
