= Television in Montenegro =

Television in Montenegro was first introduced in 1956. This is a list of television channels that broadcast in Montenegro.

== National ==
=== RTCG ===
- TVCG 1, since 1963
- TVCG 2, since 1971
- TVCG 3, since 2021
- TVCG MNE – satellite

=== Private ===
- Vijesti, since 2008
- Prva TV, since 2011
- Nova M, since 2018
- Adria TV, since 2021
- TV E, since 2022 (cable only)

== Local ==
- Gradska RTV - From Podgorica, seen in Podgorica and neighboring area
- TV 7 - From Podgorica, seen in Podgorica and neighboring area
- RTV APR – From Rožaje, seen in Rožaje and Berane
- RTV Nikšić – From Nikšić, seen in and around Nikšić
- TV Budva – From Budva, seen in and around Budva
- RTPV – From Pljevlja, seen in and around Pljevlja
- TV Teuta – From Ulcinj, seen in Ulcinj, Bar, Podgorica
- TV Novi - From Herceg Novi, seen in Herceg Novi and neighboring area
- TV BOiN – From Tuzi, seen in Tuzi, Ulcinj, Podgorica
- TV SUN – From Bijelo Polje, seen in and around Bijelo Polje

== Defunct TV stations ==
- Elmag (Podgorica) (until 2010)
- Montena (Podgorica) (from 2001 to 2015)
- IN TV (Podgorica) (from 2002 to 2013)
- MBC (Podgorica) (until 2014)
- Pink M (Budva and Podgorica) (from 2002 to 2018)
- Atlas (Podgorica) (from 2006 to 2017)
- RTV A1 (Podgorica) (from 2018 until 2021)
- NTV Apollo (Tivat)

== See also ==
- List of television stations in Serbia and Montenegro
