= List of television stations in Serbia and Montenegro =

This list of television stations in Serbia and Montenegro comprises those television stations which existed in the former union of Serbia and Montenegro during 2003 and 2006:

== National television stations ==
- RTS 1 - Serbia
- RTS 2 - Serbia
- RTS 3 - Serbia
- TV Avala - Serbia
- Prva - Serbia
- Happy TV - Serbia
- B92 - Serbia
- RTV Pink - private, Serbia and Montenegro, Bosnia, Satellite - Private
- Nova - Serbia and Montenegro, Satellite
- TVCG 1 - Montenegro
- TVCG 2 - Montenegro
- TVCG 3 - Montenegro

== Private television stations ==
- BKTV - belongs to BK Group, Serbia (lost license in June 2006 and is no longer on the air, revived in 2017 as a new name of Nova.rs and was closed in 2020)
- Studio B - city of Belgrade, Serbia
- Art - Serbia (closed as of 2016)
- Politika - Serbia (now closed)
- Hallmark - Serbian version, Serbia (became Universal Channel and then Diva)
- MTV Adria - Serbian version, Serbia (now closed)
- Sport Klub - Serbian version, Serbia (rebranded to SK 1)
- Discovery Channel - Serbian version, Serbia

== See also ==
- List of Serbian language television channels
- Television in Montenegro
- Television in Serbia
