= Radio Television Cetinje =

Public broadcaster in Cetinje, Montenegro

Radio televizija Cetinje
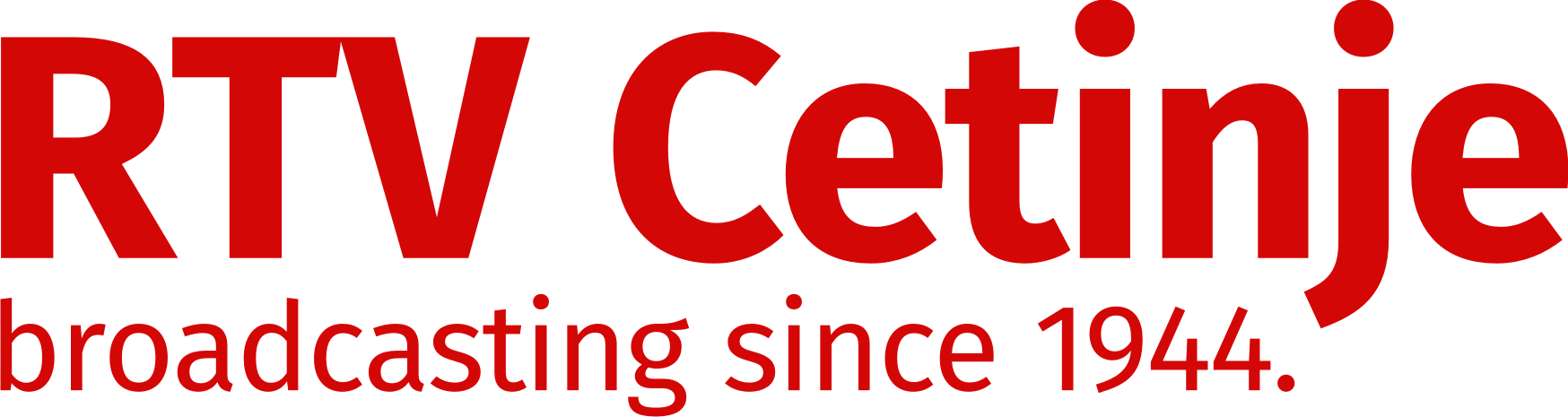
- Type: Broadcast radio, internet television and online
- Country: Montenegro
- Availability: Local (via Radio Cetinje); International (via Internet)
- Owner: City of Cetinje
- Launch date: November 27, 1944
- Former names: Radio Cetinje (1944–2011)
- Radio station: Radio Cetinje
- Internet television: TV Cetinje
- Website: CETINJE.TV
- Webcast: Listen Live
- Official website: www.cetinje.tv

RTV Cetinje (Serbian: Радио телевизија Цетиње, romanized: Radio televizija Cetinje, lit. "Radio Television Cetinje") is the local public broadcaster in Cetinje, Montenegro. It broadcasts and produces news, cultural and sports programming through radio and the Internet.
It's the oldest electronic broadcaster in Montenegro, founded on 27 November 1944.
RTV Cetinje has three media services - Radio Cetinje, Internet television and Web portal.

== History ==
From 1944 to 2011, RTV Cetinje existed as Radio Cetinje. During 2011 and 2012, after the transformation, company became a public broadcaster with three media services.

Radio Cetinje is founded on 27 November 1944, two weeks after the liberation of Cetinje in World War II. In 1949, following the process of changing the administrative seat of Montenegro (instead of Cetinje, Podgorica became capital of SR Montenegro), radio station was moved to Podgorica. New station was named Radio Titograd (old name for Podgorica), and Radio Cetinje was closed.

Radio Cetinje continued its operation in 1992, as a public FM broadcaster. In 2012, after the transformation, RTV Cetinje founded Web portal named Cetinjski list. Year later, they established Television Cetinje, as first Internet television in Montenegro.

== Media services ==
=== Radio Cetinje ===
Radio Cetinje is the oldest broadcaster in Montenegro. Founded at 1944, moved to Podgorica at 1949, Radio Cetinje continued its operation in 1992, as a public FM broadcaster. From 2017, Radio Cetinje broadcasts program online.
Radio offers a well balanced mixture of musical and informative programs 24 hours a day. It's one of rare radio stations in Montenegro which doesn't play folk music. The central program elements are local politics, educational, weather, traffic, cultural and sports information, as well as information on events taking place in Cetinje.

=== Web portal ===
In 2013, RTV Cetinje launched a Web portal named Cetinjski list. Four years later, a new website was revealed, as an online platform with news, internet radio and internet television. From 2018, although the address remained the same (cetinjskilist.com), Web portal was renamed (RTV Cetinje instead Cetinjski list).

=== Video service ===
Video service Television Cetinje is founded at 2013, as a first internet television in Montenegro. Today, videos are available via YouTube and special platform on Web portal.

== See also ==
- Radio Cetinje
- Cetinje
