= The Voice Srbija =

- Created by: John de Mol; Roel van Velzen
- Presented by: Marija Kilibarda
- Country of origin: Serbia
- Original language: Serbian
- No. of series: 1

Production
- Production location: Belgrade

Original release
- Network: Prva TV

The Voice Srbija is an unreleased Serbian reality television singing competition on Prva TV. It is based on the reality singing competition The Voice of Holland, originally created by the Dutch television producer, John de Mol, as part of The Voice franchise.

== See also ==
- Prva Srpska Televizija
- Zvezde Granda
- The Voice (TV series)
