= Super Bowl XLI =

2007 National Football League championship game

Indianapolis Colts (3) (AFC) (12–4)	Chicago Bears (1) (NFC) (13–3)
29	17
Head coach: Tony Dungy	Head coach: Lovie Smith
	1	2	3	4	Total
IND	6	10	6	7	29
CHI	14	0	3	0	17
- Date: February 4, 2007
- Stadium: Dolphin Stadium; Miami Gardens, Florida
- MVP: Peyton Manning, quarterback
- Favorite: Colts by 7
- Referee: Tony Corrente
- Attendance: 74,512

Ceremonies
- National anthem: Billy Joel
- Coin toss: Dan Marino and Norma Hunt
- Halftime show: Prince and the Florida A&M University Marching 100

TV in the United States
- Network: CBS
- Announcers: Jim Nantz, Phil Simms, Steve Tasker, Solomon Wilcots, Sam Ryan, and Lesley Visser
- Nielsen ratings: 42.6 (national) (est. 93.2 million viewers); 50.2 (Chicago); 55.5 (Indianapolis)
- Market share: 64 (national); 77 (Chicago); 83 (Indianapolis)
- Cost of 30-second commercial: US$2.6 million

Radio in the United States
- Network: Westwood One
- Announcers: Marv Albert, Boomer Esiason, John Dockery, and Bonnie Bernstein

Super Bowl XLI was an American football game played between the American Football Conference (AFC) champion Indianapolis Colts and the National Football Conference (NFC) champion Chicago Bears to decide the National Football League (NFL) champion for the 2006 season. The Colts defeated the Bears by the score of 29–17, winning their first championship since Super Bowl V in 1971 and fourth NFL championship overall. The game was played on February 4, 2007, at Dolphin Stadium in Miami Gardens, Florida. This was the first, and to date only, Super Bowl win for an AFC South team. This was also the first major professional sports championship ever won by an Indianapolis-based team.

This was the first Super Bowl since Super Bowl XXX in which neither team was seeking its first title; however, it featured two teams ending long Super Bowl appearance droughts. The Colts, who finished with a 12–4 regular season record, were making their first Super Bowl appearance since winning Super Bowl V in the 1970 season during the team's tenure in Baltimore; they had moved to Indianapolis in 1984. Meanwhile, the Bears, who posted an NFC-best 13–3 regular season record, were making their first appearance since winning Super Bowl XX in the 1985 season.

In the first Super Bowl played in rainy conditions, the Colts overcame a 14–6 first-quarter deficit to outscore the Bears 23–3 in the last three quarters. The Bears posted the then-earliest lead in Super Bowl history when returner Devin Hester ran back the opening kickoff 92 yards for a touchdown after 14 seconds had elapsed (a record later broken in Super Bowl XLVIII when the Seattle Seahawks scored a safety 12 seconds into the game). The Colts forced five turnovers, including cornerback Kelvin Hayden's 56-yard interception return for a touchdown. Colts kicker Adam Vinatieri also scored three field goals. Colts quarterback Peyton Manning was named the game's Most Valuable Player (MVP), completing 25 of 38 passes for 247 yards and a touchdown, with one interception for a passer rating of 81.8.

CBS's broadcast of the game was watched by an estimated average of 93.2 million viewers, making it at the time the fifth most watched program in U.S. television history. The halftime show, headlined by the musician Prince, peaked at 140 million viewers, and was widely acclaimed by music critics.

== Background ==
=== Host selection process ===
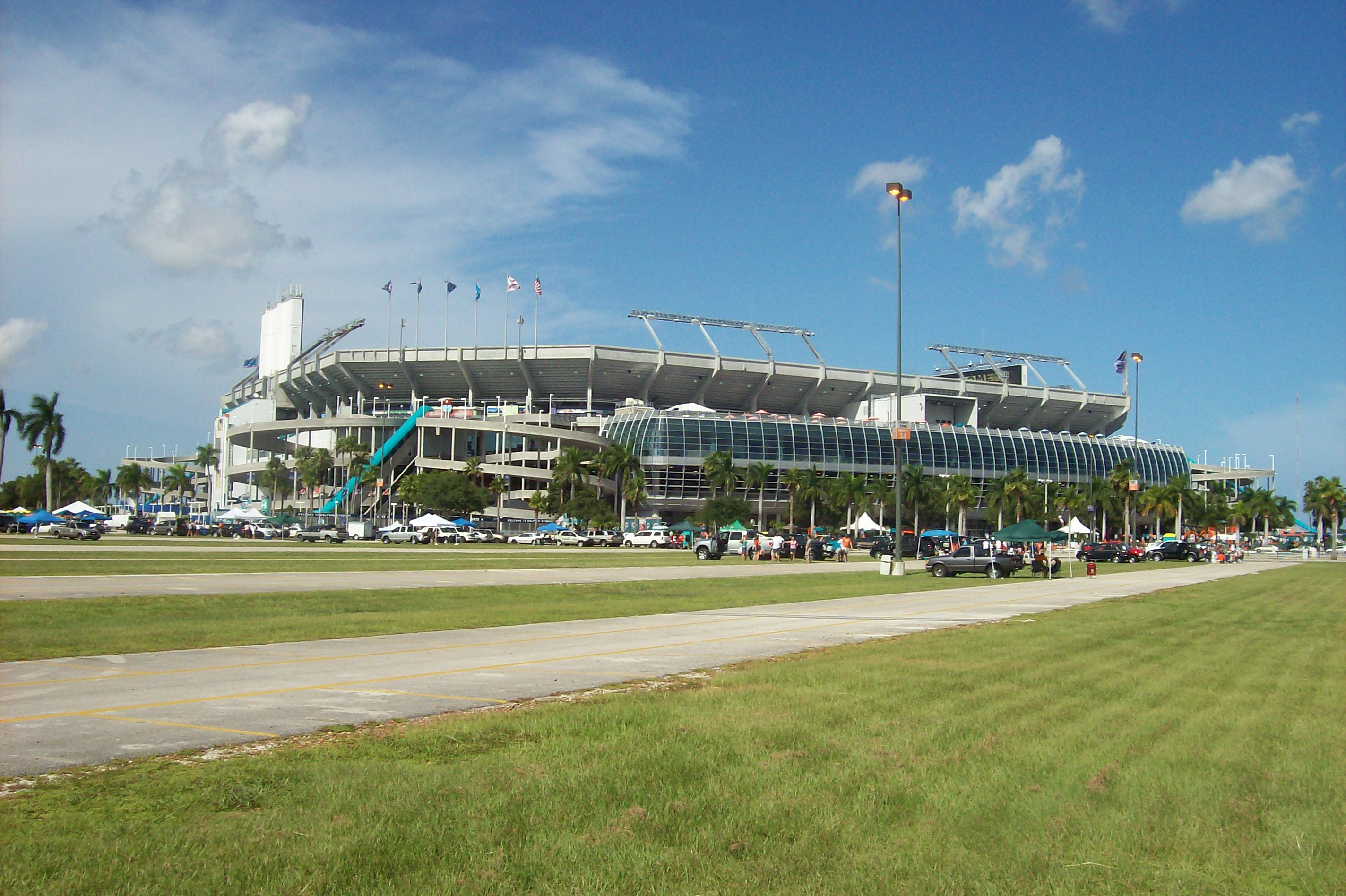
Dolphin Stadium (now Hard Rock Stadium) was selected to be the host site for Super Bowl XLI

NFL owners voted to award Super Bowl XLI to Miami Gardens during their September 17, 2003 meeting held in Washington, D.C. It marked the ninth Super Bowl in the Miami area, tying New Orleans for the most times hosting. Four cities were part of the initial bid process: Miami (Dolphin Stadium), Tampa (Raymond James Stadium), New York/New Jersey (Giants Stadium), and Washington (FedEx Field). In early 2002, during his annual "State of the League" press conference, NFL commissioner Paul Tagliabue publicly floated the idea of awarding XLI to New York City, contingent on a renovation of Giants Stadium. If selected, it would be the first outdoor Super Bowl in a cold-weather locale. Hosting the game at the Meadowlands in East Rutherford, New Jersey was conceived in-part as an effort to boost economic recovery in the wake of 9/11. As such, Washington, D.C. was also invited to submit a bid. Tagliabue stated at the time that hosting the Super Bowl only in warm-weather cities (or in domed stadiums) was considered "passé in our league" and directed the Super Bowl Advisory Committee to study the feasibility of hosting it outdoors in a northern city.

Both the New York/New Jersey and the Washington, D.C. contingents made special presentations during the NFL's fall owners meeting in New York on October 30–31, 2002. The NY/NJ group included representatives from both the Giants and the Jets, and had support from Senators Chuck Schumer and Robert Torricelli. The Jets at the time happened to be in the early planning stages of West Side Stadium, though the league noted that the proposed stadium's status would not be a factor in the decision. Instead, substantial renovations to aging Giants Stadium would be the driving issue. The D.C. group included representatives from the Redskins. Following the meeting, however, the bids for both NY/NJ and Washington were tabled, and instead reassigned and refocused towards XLII. The next day, the league announced that Miami and Tampa would be the only candidates going forward for XLI. Los Angeles/Pasadena was also a "distant possibility", but only if renovations were made to the Rose Bowl.

During the March 26, 2003 owners meeting in Phoenix, Paul Tagliabue stated that Miami had become the front-runner to land XLI, and that Tampa had been dropped from consideration. This despite neither city having yet made a formal presentation. League officials noted that Tampa had just hosted XXXV in January 2001, while Miami had not hosted since XXXIII in January 1999. Furthermore, Miami had lost out on the vote for XXXIX in somewhat unexpected fashion, and XLI was simply the next game available to them. With an adequate stadium, and a lengthy history of successfully hosting the Super Bowl, the only condition that the Miami hosting committee would be required to satisfy was to have contracts already in place for hotel rooms and ancillary events. This procedural change was made after Detroit's bid for XL in which these critical items were still pending at the time of award. A formal vote was scheduled for September 2003, and Miami won without opposition.

Originally known as Joe Robbie Stadium, this was the fourth Super Bowl held at the facility. It previously hosted XXIII, XXIX, and XXXIII. Super Bowls II, III, V, X, and XIII were also in Miami, but held at the Miami Orange Bowl. At the time of the awarding, the stadium was known as Pro Player Stadium. However, by the time the game was held, the stadium's name had been changed to Dolphin Stadium. This was the first Super Bowl played at the stadium since the city of Miami Gardens (where the stadium is located) was incorporated on May 13, 2003. After being rejected, Tampa would eventually land XLIII. NY/NJ would ultimately host XLVIII at new MetLife Stadium.

In February 2006, the NFL and the South Florida Super Bowl XLI Host Committee unveiled the slogan "one game, one dream" for the game, referring to the entire South Florida region working together to present the event. The Super Bowl XLI logo was also unveiled, featuring the colors orange (to represent the sun) and blue (for the ocean). The "I" in the Roman numeral "XLI" was drawn to resemble a pylon placed at each corner of an end zone because "the goal is to get to the game". The logo had the same shade of orange as the logo of the host city's home team, the Miami Dolphins.

=== Teams ===
==== Indianapolis Colts ====
The Colts' first trip to the Super Bowl in 36 years set a record for longest time between appearances by a team (since broken by the Kansas City Chiefs). Their return was the culmination of a nine-year-long building process. In 1998, they drafted quarterback Peyton Manning to lead the team. Over the next four seasons, Manning, along with other stars such as receiver Marvin Harrison and running back Edgerrin James, turned the Colts into one of the best offensive teams in the NFL, but the team struggled to find consistency on defense and always ended up with either a losing season or elimination from the playoffs in the first round. After the 2001 season, the Colts fired head coach Jim Mora and replaced him with Tony Dungy. Dungy had developed one of the best defenses in the NFL while coaching the Tampa Bay Buccaneers, and it was hoped he could solve the Colts' defensive problems as well.

Over the next four seasons, the Colts won 48 of 64 games, but still could not find much success in the postseason. In 2002, they were blown out 41–0 in the Wild Card playoffs by the New York Jets. In 2003, they won their first two playoff games behind impressive offensive performances, and reached the AFC Championship Game. There, they lost to the New England Patriots 24–14, with Manning throwing four interceptions. In 2004, the Colts had one of the most spectacular offensive seasons in NFL history, scoring 522 points and gaining 6,582 yards, while Manning set NFL records for most touchdown passes and highest passer rating. But again the New England Patriots' defense (and snowy conditions) proved too formidable, as they lost 20–3 in the Divisional playoffs.

In 2005, the Colts' defense improved, making the team the clear favorites in the NFL. They won the first 13 games of the season and finished with a 14–2 record, while ranking second in the NFL in both points scored and fewest points allowed. But once again they lost in Divisional playoffs, this time to the #6 seeded Pittsburgh Steelers, 21–18. The Colts' playoff runs ended with a loss to the eventual Super Bowl champions in three consecutive years preceding this season. After another disappointing loss, Manning had developed a reputation of being unable to make it to a championship, a reputation that followed him from college after he was unable to win an NCAA title with the Tennessee Volunteers (who won a title the year after he graduated). The Colts lost some key players after the 2005 season, including James, who departed the Colts for the Arizona Cardinals, and kicker Mike Vanderjagt, the NFL's all-time leader in field goal percentage, who left for the Dallas Cowboys. However, they did gain one key addition: 31-year old special teams returner Terrence Wilkins. Though he had been out of the NFL for three years, Wilkins finished the season with 52 kickoff returns for 1,272 yards (9th in the NFL).

Still, the Colts remained one of the AFC's top teams in the 2006 season. Manning made the Pro Bowl for the 7th time in his career, completing 362 of 555 passes for 4,397 yards and an NFL-best 31 touchdowns, with an additional 4 rushing touchdowns and with only 9 interceptions and 15 sacks. His favorite target was Harrison, who caught 95 passes for 1,366 yards and 12 touchdowns. Receiver Reggie Wayne was also a major deep threat with 86 receptions for 1,310 yards and 9 touchdowns. Tight ends Ben Utecht and Dallas Clark were also reliable targets, each recording over 30 receptions for over 300 yards. On the ground, rookie running back Joseph Addai led the team with 1,081 yards and a 4.8 yards-per-carry average despite not starting any games in the regular season. He also caught 40 receptions for 325 yards and scored 8 touchdowns. Running back Dominic Rhodes was also a major contributor, rushing for 641 yards and catching 36 passes for 251 yards. The offensive line was led by Pro Bowlers Jeff Saturday and Tarik Glenn. On special teams, the Colts signed kicker Adam Vinatieri to replace Vanderjagt. While Vinatieri's career field goal percentage was lower, the Colts considered him to be an improvement because of his reputation for making "clutch" kicks, a reputation aided by his game winning field goals in Super Bowl XXXVI and Super Bowl XXXVIII.

The Colts' defense ranked second in the NFL in fewest passing yards allowed. Dwight Freeney (5.5 sacks and 4 forced fumbles) and Robert Mathis (9.5 sacks, 4 forced fumbles, 2 fumble recoveries) were widely considered to be among the best pass-rushing defensive ends in the NFL. Behind them, linebacker Cato June led the team in tackles (142) and interceptions (3). Cornerback Nick Harper added 3 interceptions and 75 tackles. The Colts' run defense, however, was a major problem, giving up 2,768 yards on the ground, an average of 173 per game and last in the NFL. Another major issue for the Colts was their coverage teams, as they ranked 30th out of 32 teams in average kickoff return yardage allowed and 31st in average punt return yardage allowed. One key issue for the team was the loss of safeties Mike Doss and Bob Sanders, who had missed most of the seasons with injuries.

The Colts started out the season winning their first nine games, but ended up losing four of their next seven and finished with a 12–4 record, giving them the #3 playoff seed. Therefore, they had to play in a wild card playoff game. In the Wild Card playoffs, they defeated the Kansas City Chiefs 23–8, then defeated the Baltimore Ravens 15–6 in the Divisional playoffs, and advanced to Super Bowl XLI with a 38–34 win over the New England Patriots in the AFC Championship Game after rallying from a 21–3 deficit.

==== Chicago Bears ====
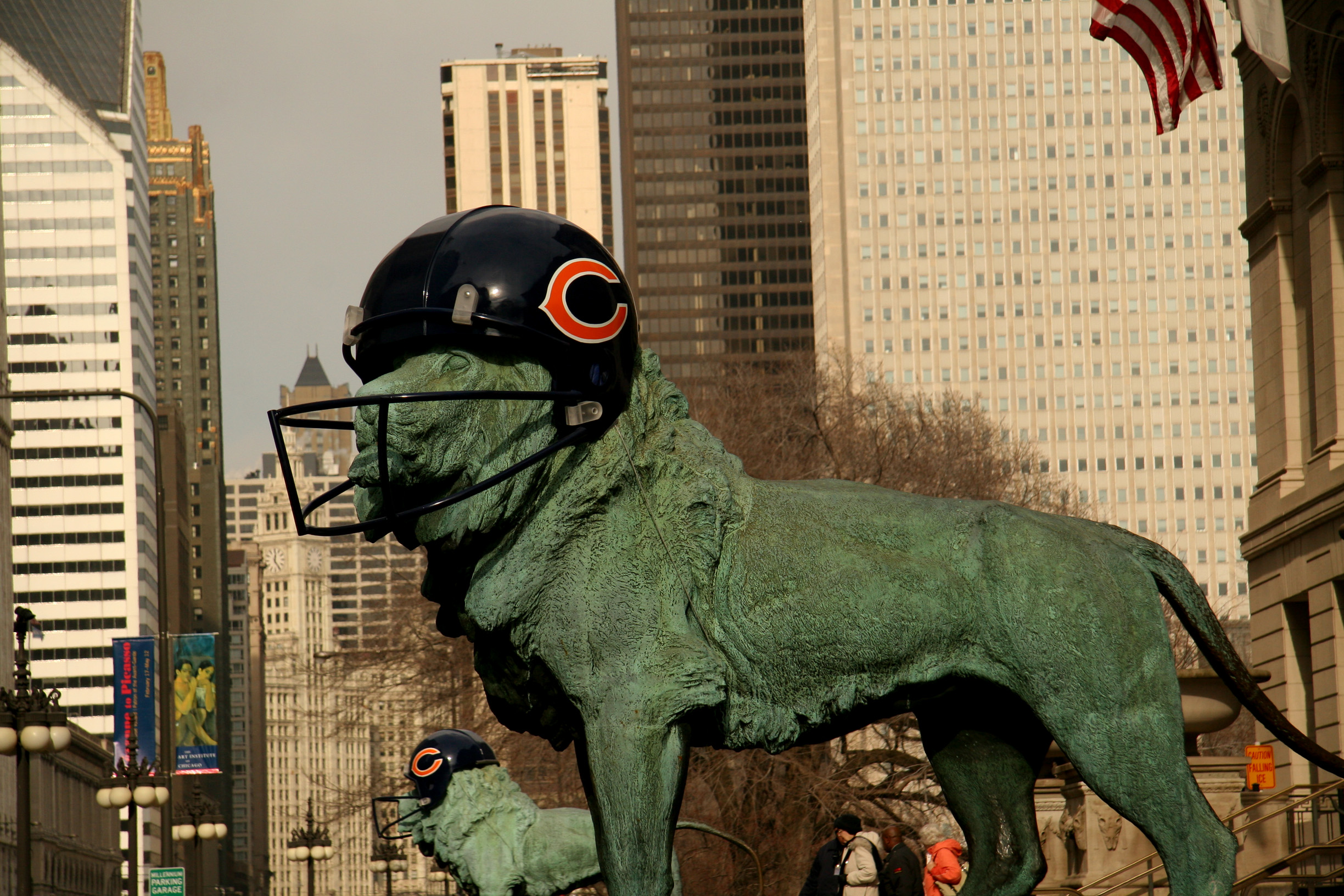
The Art Institute of Chicago's lion sculptures were decorated to show support for the Chicago Bears

The Bears finished the season with an NFC best 13–3 record and advanced to the second Super Bowl in franchise history. They defeated the Seattle Seahawks 27–24 in overtime in the divisional round of the playoffs, and the New Orleans Saints 39–14 in the NFC Championship game to advance to Super Bowl XLI. The team excelled on defense, ranking third in fewest points allowed (255) and second in fewest points allowed per drive. They also ranked second in scoring (427 points), although only tenth in points per offensive drive thanks to a league leading 65 points scored on defensive or special teams plays.

The Bears' offense was led by quarterback Rex Grossman, the team's first-round draft pick in 2003. Over the previous three seasons, Grossman had played in just 8 regular season games due to injuries, but he recovered to start in all 16 games in 2006. By the end of the season, he finished with 3,193 yards and 23 touchdowns, the most by a Bears quarterback since 1995. Grossman had difficulty avoiding turnovers, however, and threw 20 interceptions and lost five fumbles during the year. In the last seven games of the season, he turned the ball over 18 times. Many fans and sports writers expected head coach Lovie Smith to bench him at some point, but Smith insisted that Grossman would be the starter throughout the entire season.

Receivers Muhsin Muhammad (60 receptions, 863 yards, 5 touchdowns) and Bernard Berrian (51 receptions, 775 yards, 7 touchdowns) provided the main deep threat on the team, along with tight end Desmond Clark, who caught 45 passes for 626 yards and 6 touchdowns. The Bears' running game was led by running backs Thomas Jones and Cedric Benson. Jones rushed for 1,210 yards and caught 36 passes, while Benson rushed for 647 yards and scored 6 touchdowns.

The Bears' defense allowed the 5th least total yardage, allowed less than 100 yards per game on the ground, and allowed the fewest yards per drive of any NFL team. The line was anchored by Adewale Ogunleye, who had 6.5 sacks, and Pro Bowler Tommie Harris, who recorded 5, along with rookie Mark Anderson, who led the team with 12 sacks. Behind them, two of the three Bears starting linebackers, Lance Briggs, and Brian Urlacher, were selected to the 2007 Pro Bowl. In the secondary, cornerbacks Ricky Manning and Charles Tillman each recorded five interceptions. The defense was also able to make up for the offense's poor performance earlier in the season, as explained in the win against the Cardinals in Week 6.

The loss of Harris to injury after the 12th game of the season coincided with a decline in defensive performance. Before his loss, the Bears allowed only two opponents to score more than 20 points (23 points to the Arizona Cardinals in week six and 31 to the Miami Dolphins in week 9). After his injury, Bears opponents scored more than 20 points in six of the seven remaining games, including two of three playoff games. Only the New Orleans Saints in the NFC Championship Game were held below 21 points.

The Bears' special teams sent three players to the Pro Bowl, including special teams ace Brendon Ayanbadejo, kicker Robbie Gould (who led all NFL kickers with 143 points), and rookie return man Devin Hester, who gained 600 punt return yards with a 12.8 yards per return average, the second highest in the NFL. He also set a league record with 6 touchdowns on special teams.

==== Regular season statistical comparison ====
The chart below provides a comparison of regular season statistics in key categories (overall rank amongst 32 teams in parentheses).

Statistic	Indianapolis Colts	Chicago Bears
Points scored per game	26.7 (2nd, tied)	26.7 (2nd, tied)
Points allowed per game	22.5 (23rd)	15.9 (3rd)
Rushing yards gained per game	110.1 (18th)	119.9 (15th)
Rushing yards allowed per game	173.0 (32nd)	99.4 (6th)
Passing yards gained per game	269.2 (2nd)	205.1 (14th)
Passing yards allowed per game	159.2 (2nd)	194.8 (11th)
Yards gained per play	6.0 (2nd)	5.0 (21st)
Yards allowed per play	5.5 (29th)	4.6 (2nd)
Time of possession per game	29:32 (23rd)	30:56 (11th)
Third-down conversion percentage	56 (1st)	37 (22nd)
Third-down conversion percentage allowed	47 (32nd)	31 (2nd)
Fourth-down conversion percentage	0 (32nd)	69 (4th, tied)
Fourth-down conversion percentage allowed	79 (30th, tied)	62 (27th)
Total turnover differential	+7 (7th)	+8 (4th)

=== Playoffs ===
Although the Colts' rushing defense looked extremely weak during the season, it ended up being a key factor on their road to the Super Bowl. First, the Colts defeated the Kansas City Chiefs 23–8, holding Chiefs running back Larry Johnson (who rushed for 1,789 yards during the season) to just 32 yards on 13 carries. Then, they defeated the Baltimore Ravens 15–6, winning on a playoff record-tying five field goals by Vinatieri and holding running back Jamal Lewis (who rushed for 1,132 yards during the season) to just 53 yards.

Then the Colts faced their arch-rival New England Patriots in the AFC Championship Game. The Patriots jumped to an early 21–3 lead, but the Colts stormed back in the second half, outscoring the Patriots 32–13 with an additional field goal late in the first half. With 2:22 left in the game, the Colts had the ball on their own 20-yard line trailing 34–31. On the first four plays of the drive, Manning completed three passes, moving the ball 69 yards to the Patriots' 11-yard line in just 24 seconds. Three plays later, Addai scored a 3-yard touchdown run to put them in the lead, 38–34 with only 60 seconds left in regulation. The Patriots responded with a drive to the Colts' 45-yard line, but defensive back Marlin Jackson ended the drive with an interception to give the Colts the win. With their 18-point comeback win, the Colts set the record for biggest comeback in AFC-NFC Conference Championship history (since tied by the 2021 Cincinnati Bengals).

Meanwhile, the Bears started out their post-season with a 27–24 win over the Seattle Seahawks with Robbie Gould's 49-yard field goal in overtime. One week later, they defeated the New Orleans Saints 39–14 in the NFC Championship Game. The Bears dominated most of the game, jumping to a 16–0 early lead. Two touchdown passes from Saints quarterback Drew Brees, cut the score to 16–14, but the Bears responded with 23 unanswered points to propel them to their first Super Bowl since the 1985 season. Thomas Jones finished the game with a franchise postseason record 123 rushing yards and two touchdowns.

It was the first time since the 1996 postseason that the home team won both of the conference championship games. The Colts were the first dome team to win the Super Bowl in an outdoor game (the St. Louis Rams were the first dome team to win a Super Bowl, XXXIV inside the Georgia Dome in Atlanta). The 2006 Indianapolis Colts were the first division champion to win a Super Bowl with four postseason wins and the second division champion (2003 Carolina Panthers) to win a conference title with three postseason wins.

For the Bears, this marked the first time that a Chicago sports team not owned by Jerry Reinsdorf had reached the championship game/series in their league since the Blackhawks lost in the 1992 Stanley Cup Final.

=== Super Bowl pre-game practices and notes ===
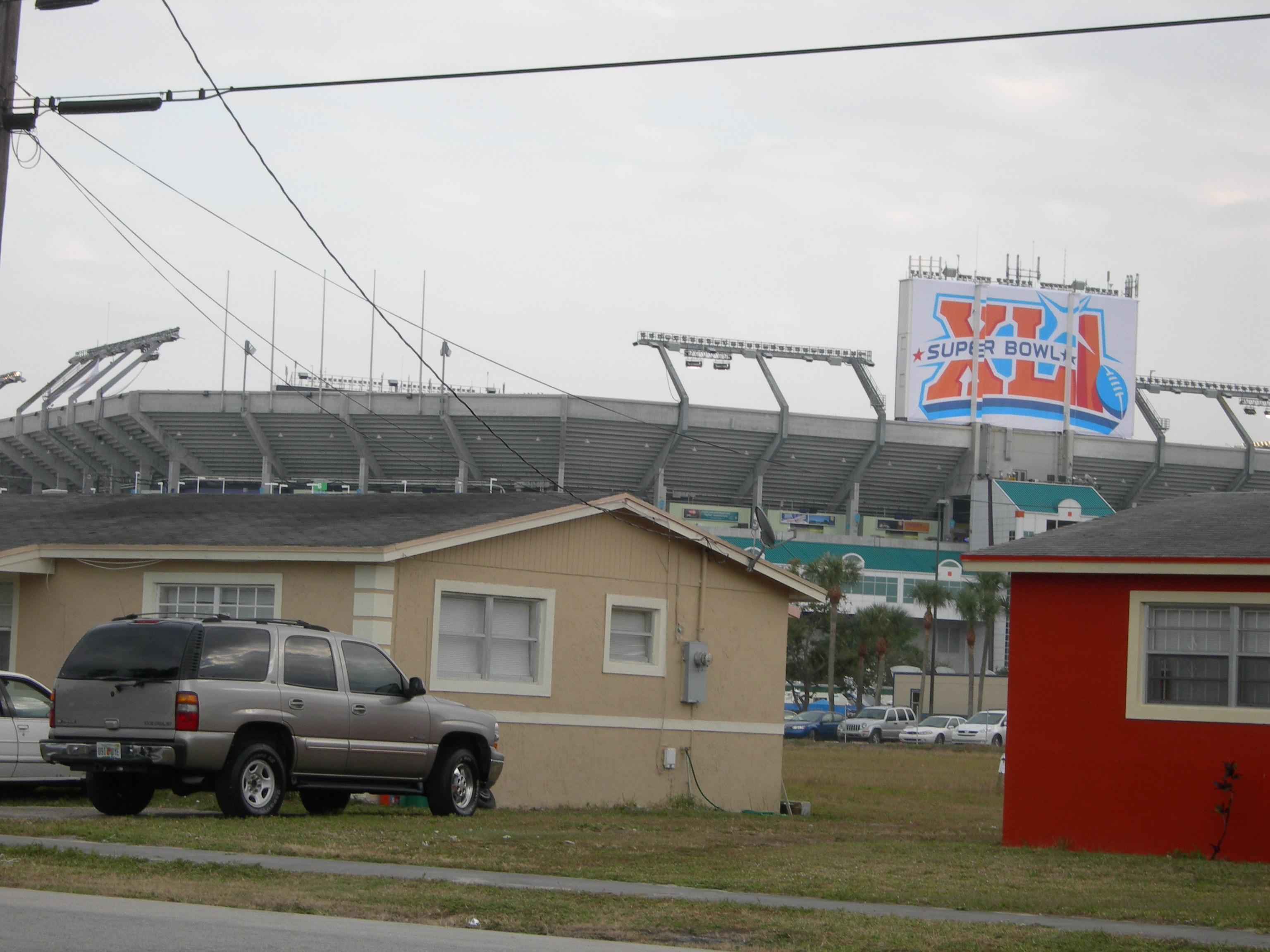
Dolphin Stadium prepares for Super Bowl XLI

The Indianapolis Colts held pre-game practices for Super Bowl XLI at the Miami Dolphins Training Facility on the campus of Nova Southeastern University in Davie, Florida. The Colts' "Team and Family" hotel was the Marriott Harbor Beach. At the 2007 Indianapolis 500 pre-race ceremonies on May 27, 2007, eventual Super Bowl XLI MVP Peyton Manning stated to ABC Sports commentator Brent Musburger the day before the game that two-time Indianapolis 500 winner Hélio Castroneves gave a pep talk to the Colts team.

The Chicago Bears held pre-game practices for Super Bowl XLI at the Miami Hurricanes football facility on the campus of the University of Miami in Coral Gables, Florida.

Bears defensive tackle Tank Johnson was required to request a judge's order to leave the state of Illinois due to an arrest for unlicensed ownership of six firearms and two assault rifles. On January 23, 2007, the judge granted him permission to travel out of state to play in the Super Bowl.

Chicago and Indianapolis are the two closest cities, geographically, to ever play in a Super Bowl; at 182 miles (293 km) apart (connected by a route that is mostly Interstate 65), they are slightly closer than New York and Baltimore, whose teams played each other at III (207 miles) and XXXV (188 miles). This prompted Colts head coach Tony Dungy to joke to Jim Nantz, at the end of the AFC Championship game, that the two teams should split the difference and play the game in Fort Wayne.

This was the first Super Bowl since Super Bowl V that all players on both teams wore black shoes. As the designated home team in the annual rotation between AFC and NFC teams, the Bears elected to wear their home navy uniforms with white pants, while the Colts wore their road white uniforms with white pants.

Tony Dungy and Lovie Smith had a history with each other. Smith had previously worked under Dungy as linebackers coach for the Tampa Bay Buccaneers from 1996 to 2000.

== Broadcasting ==
=== United States ===
==== Television ====
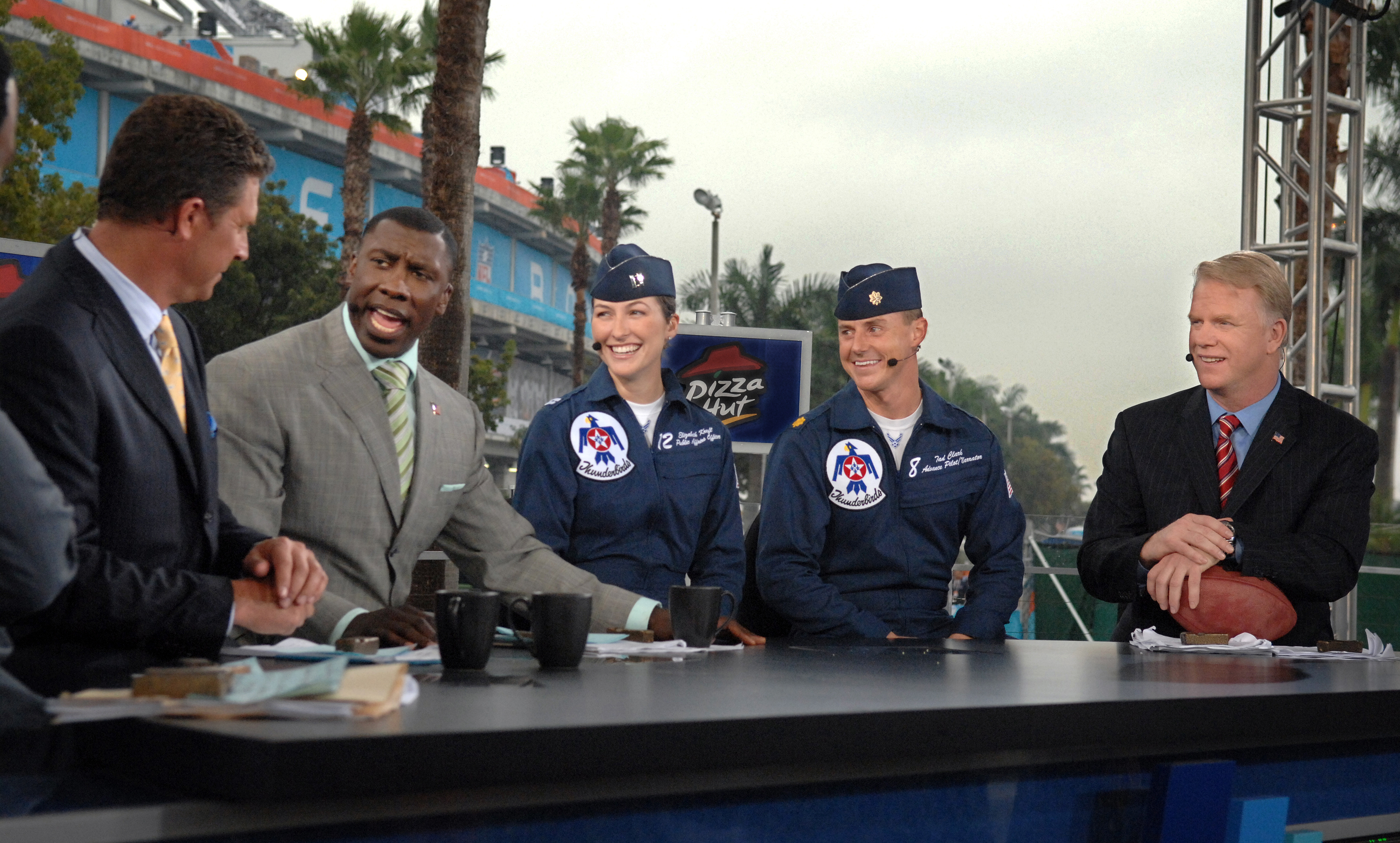
The NFL Today pre-game show with officers of the U.S. Air Force Thunderbirds

The game was televised in the United States by CBS in high-definition.

Jim Nantz called his first Super Bowl as a play-by-play announcer. He was joined in the booth by color commentator Phil Simms. Additionally, Solomon Wilcots (Bears sideline) and Steve Tasker (Colts sideline) reported on the sidelines and Lesley Visser (Bears sideline) and Sam Ryan (Colts sideline) in the stands.

Extensive pre-game coverage, hosted by The NFL Today team of James Brown, Shannon Sharpe, Boomer Esiason and Dan Marino, began at noon ET with NFL Films' "Road to the Super Bowl" year in review (narrated by Tom Selleck). This was followed by "The Phil Simms All-Iron Team", and a four-and-a-half-hour Super Bowl Today pre-game show followed by game coverage at 6:25 PM. Other contributors to the pre-game show included Katie Couric, anchor of the CBS Evening News, Armen Keteyian, CBS News Chief Investigative Correspondent, Randy Cross, who reported from Iraq where U.S. military forces played a touch football game known as "The Baghdad Bowl" and Dick Enberg, who participated in his 12th Super Bowl telecast as a host, play-by-play announcer, or contributor.

The opening title sequence of CBS television coverage featured the composition Lux Aeterna, by artist Clint Mansell, in the background.

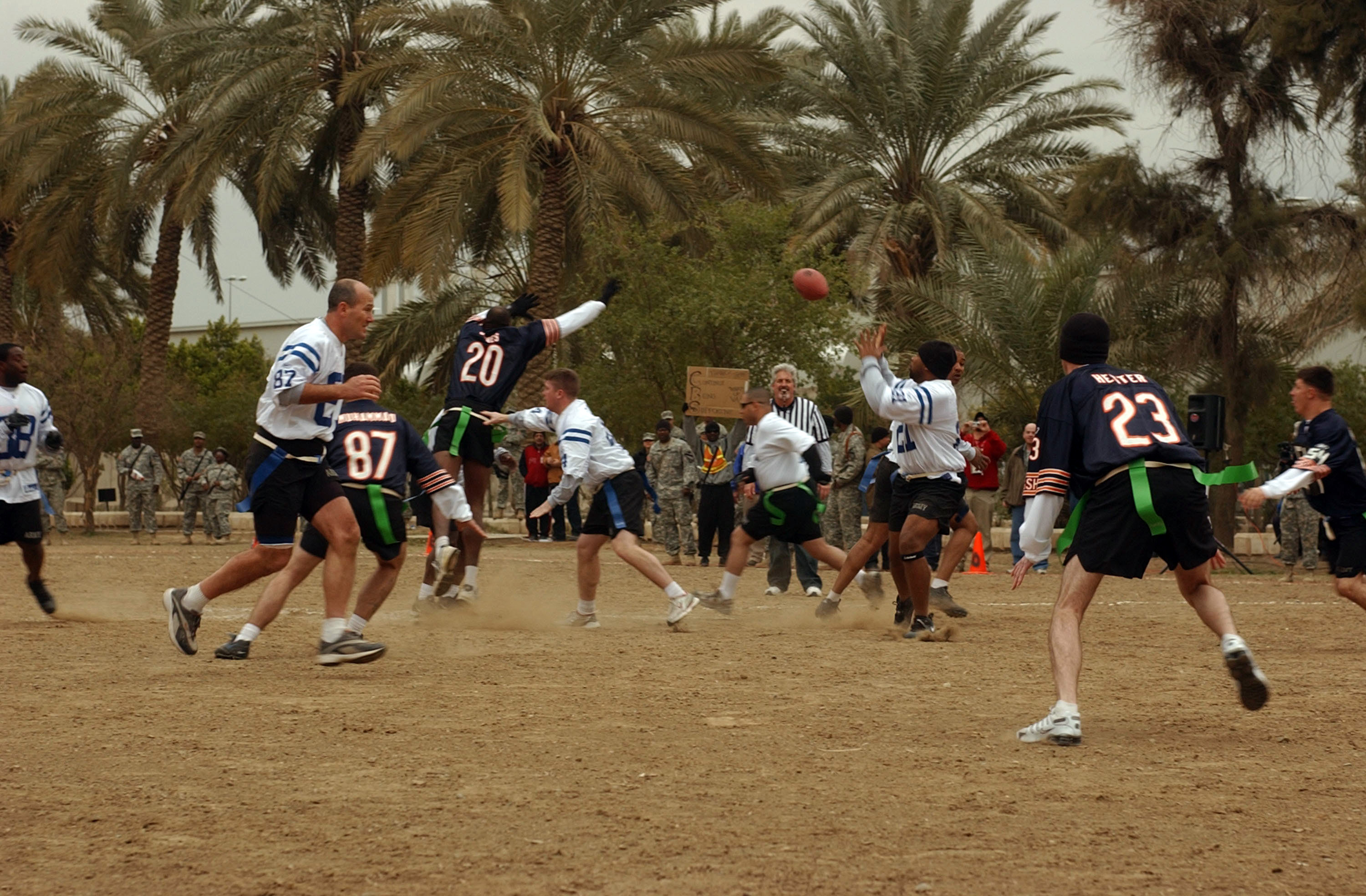
"The Baghdad Bowl" flag football game played in Iraq

The American Forces Network (AFN) provided coverage of the Super Bowl for U.S. forces stationed overseas and to all U.S. Navy ships at sea.

==== Ratings ====
Nielsen Media Research reported 93 million viewers for Super Bowl XLI, making it at the time the fifth most watched program in U.S. television history (trailing only the M*A*S*H finale and Super Bowls XLIII, XXX, and XLII).

==== Advertising ====
Advertising rates were reported as being slightly higher than in the year before, with CBS confirming a price of $2.6 million for some 30-second spots, compared with $2.5 million during Super Bowl XL. However, CNN reported that after discounts, the average price is likely closer to $1.8 to $2 million. Familiar advertisers in recent years such as Anheuser-Busch, CareerBuilder, General Motors and Coca-Cola bought multiple advertising spots, and other popular advertisers like Go Daddy and Emerald Nuts had commercials this year.

The only major hype related to commercials in the months leading up to Super Bowl XLI involved various campaigns to allow consumers to be involved in the creation of Super Bowl ads, inspired by consumer-generated content sites like YouTube. Frito-Lay announced a campaign in September 2006 to allow the public to submit ads for their Doritos brand and vote on the best one, which aired during the Super Bowl. Doritos actually aired two of the ads due to a close voting margin; the winning ad (featuring a chance meeting with a man and a woman that feature the qualities of Doritos) aired in the first quarter, while a second (with a checkout lady overly enamored with the product) aired in the second quarter. The five finalists each received $10,000 in this contest. General Motors announced a similar contest, open only to college students, for their Chevrolet brand; however, the ad would be produced professionally based on ideas suggested by the public. The winning ad featured men gathering around an HHR model with women in it and stripping off their clothes and giving it a car wash. The NFL itself advertised a similar contest to generate suggestions for a commercial promoting the league, with the winning concept featuring fans' disappointment that their teams' season was over.

The annual USA Today Super Bowl Ad Meter survey chose a Budweiser ad featuring crabs worshiping an ice chest with that particular beer inside as the top ad of Super Bowl XLI, followed by another Budweiser commercial featuring a stray dog with mud spots climbing onto the brewery's trademark Clydesdale-drawn wagon in a parade. In all, Anheuser-Busch took seven of the top ten spots in the annual survey, sweeping the top three spots. A YouTube user survey chose the Doritos "Snack Hard" ad (produced for the incredible price of $12, the cost of three bags of the snack product) as their top ad, that ad finished fourth in the USA Today survey. ADBOWL results were slightly different with only 6 of Anheuser-Busch's ads finishing in the top ten. The highest ranked being the Bud Light "Rock, Paper, Scissors" spot. Also in the top ten were Blockbuster Video's "Mouse", Doritos' "Car Wreck", GM's "Robot" and Taco Bell's "Lion's Talk 'Carne'."

One ad that drew criticism from the gay community was for the Snickers candy bar featuring two men accidentally "kissing" each other after sharing the product in question, then proceeded to rip chest hairs as a manly act as homophobic. The ad proved to be controversial, and the ad was cancelled the next day by Masterfoods USA (Mars, Incorporated's snack food division), and three other versions were deleted from the snickers.com web site. The ad was ninth in the USA Today ad survey, and according to a Masterfoods publicist, not intended to harm anyone.

A different ad for General Motors featured a laid off assembly line robot contemplating suicide, which drew criticism from the American Foundation for Suicide Prevention. The group asked for an apology from GM, and that the ad be taken off the air and the company's website. The suicide scene was replaced with a scene of the robot watching a car being crushed at a junkyard when it was shown again during the 79th Academy Awards on February 25.

==== Radio ====
Westwood One provided radio coverage of the event, with Marv Albert and Boomer Esiason as announcers.

=== International ===
The Super Bowl was broadcast live in Canada on CBS (which is available in Canada) as well as Global TV and NTV which both took the main CBS commentary, and on the French cable channel RDS. In the United Kingdom the Super Bowl was broadcast on ITV1, Sky Sports 1 & Sky Sports HD1 with Sky Sports taking the main CBS commentary and ITV taking the NFL supplied international commentary feed of Spero Dedes and Sterling Sharpe.

Super Bowl XLI was broadcast in over 200 countries. Amongst the television networks who broadcast Super Bowl XLI were:

- Argentina – ESPN Argentina and Fox Sports
- Australia – SBS, Fox Sports and ESPN broadcast the game live (All International Feed).
- Austria – ORF 1, DSF
- Belize – Channel 5, Channel 7 (both CBS feed)
- Brazil – BandSports and ESPN International; Bandeirantes also broadcast a condensed version of the game
- Canada – Global, NTV (English) and RDS (French)
- Chile – ESPN Latin-America and Fox Sports
- Colombia – ESPN Latin-America and Fox Sports
- China – CCTV-5
- Croatia – Z1
- Denmark – TV2 Zulu
- Finland – MTV3
- France – France 2
- Germany – ARD (international feed), NASN (international feed), DSF (on tape delay)
- Hungary – Sport 1
- Iceland – Sýn
- Ireland – TV3, Sky Sports
- Italy – Sky Sport Italia (in HDTV)
- India – ESPN Asia
- Japan – NHK BS-1, Nippon Television
- South Korea – Seoul Broadcasting System
- North Macedonia – Sport 4
- Mexico – Televisa, TV Azteca (in HDTV)
- Montenegro – Elmag RTV
- Netherlands – NASN (HDTV)
- New Zealand – Sky Sports, ESPN
- Norway – Viasat SportN
- Peru – Fox Sports, ESPN
- Philippines – Studio 23, Solar Sports
- Poland – Canal +
- Portugal – SportTV 1
- Romania – Sport 1
- Russia – NTV Plus
- Spain – Canal +
- Serbia – SportKlub
- Sweden – TV6 (Sweden)
- Thailand – True Vision Super Sport ch.61, ESPN
- Turkey – Fox Sports Turkey
- United Kingdom – ITV1 (would be their last Super Bowl broadcast until 2023), Sky Sports and Sky Sports HD (CBS feed and announcers)

== Entertainment ==
=== Pre-game ceremonies ===
Before the game, Cirque du Soleil, Romero Britto and Little Louie Vega performed as the pre-game act, and Billy Joel sang the National Anthem, accompanying himself on piano. He also performed at Super Bowl XXIII, which was played at the same venue. Joel became the second person to sing the National Anthem twice for a Super Bowl; Aaron Neville sang the national anthem before Super Bowl XXIV, in New Orleans, and Super Bowl XL (along with Aretha Franklin), in Detroit. This was also the last time until Luke Bryan sang at Super Bowl LI that a male artist had sung the national anthem at a Super Bowl.

Two days before the game, 4 tornadoes devastated Central Florida, causing over $200 million in damage, and causing numerous injuries and 21 deaths. A moment of silence was held before kickoff, in honor of the victims of the severe weather.

Marlee Matlin and Jason Hay-Southwell performed the National Anthem in American Sign Language. The anthem was concluded by the first ever Super Bowl flyover from the U.S. Air Force Thunderbirds demonstration squadron in their custom painted F-16C Fighting Falcons.

Besides participating in the CBS telecast of the pre-game show, Dan Marino also participated in the coin toss along with Norma Hunt, who was the widow of Lamar Hunt, the former owner of the Kansas City Chiefs and the man who gave the Super Bowl its name.

=== Halftime show ===
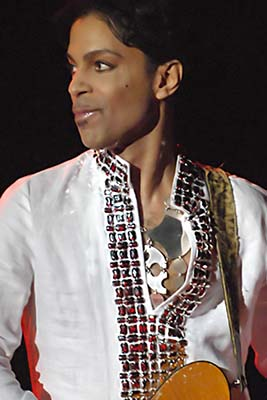
American singer and musician Prince headlined the halftime show

American singer and musician Prince performed in the halftime show. The setlist for Prince's performance was a short rendition of "We Will Rock You" by Queen; Prince's hit songs "Let's Go Crazy" and "Baby I'm a Star"; covers of Creedence Clearwater Revival's "Proud Mary", Bob Dylan's "All Along the Watchtower", and Foo Fighters' "Best of You"; and finally his signature song "Purple Rain" in the downpour. The 12-minute performance featured Prince accompanied by two dancers he called "The Twinz" (Maya and Nandy McClean) and the Florida A&M University marching band, the Marching 100. Prince had rehearsed with the drum line for a week before the performance. The performance was on a large, central stage which was shaped like Prince's logo, and was outlined with lights. He played before 74,512 fans at Dolphin Stadium, who had been given flashlights to point at the stage during the performance of "Purple Rain". The event was carried "to the biggest audience of his life" with 140 million television viewers. Overall, the show was energetic and well received by the rain-soaked audience surrounding the stage. Music critics were extremely enthusiastic about his performance, one calling it "arguably the best halftime show in Super Bowl history", and others saying it was one of the best ever.

Following the game, controversy emerged about a silhouetted camera shot of Prince, projected against a large sheet by a bright light on the other side of him. The controversy centered around his guitar, which detractors claimed seemed phallic, and critics stating that it "looked embarrassingly rude, crude and unfortunately placed". Though the guitar has been considered by some an extension of a male player's sexuality (especially highlighted by such artists as Jimi Hendrix, Eddie Van Halen, and even Prince himself), supporters of Prince say that the show did not, in fact, become any more sexually charged than usual, noting that "a guitar at waist level does look like an enormous phallus". In 2015, Entertainment Tonight listed the silhouetted camera shot, naming it "Prince's Demon Phallus", as one of the top seven Super Bowl halftime moments. In 2016, shortly after Prince's death, the halftime show's producer Don Mischer said that having a silhouetted camera shot of Prince was his idea, but denied it was meant to be a phallic statement.

=== Post-game ceremonies ===
Former Colts and Dolphins head coach Don Shula presented the Vince Lombardi Trophy to the Colts after the game, and Peyton Manning was named MVP.

== Game summary ==
External videos
- Full game broadcast on CBS on YouTube

=== First quarter ===
The Bears won the coin toss and elected to receive. For the first time in Super Bowl history, the game was played in the rain, which was continuous throughout the game.

The rain did not hinder Bears return specialist Devin Hester, who ran back the opening kickoff 92 yards for a touchdown to give the Bears the then earliest lead in Super Bowl history, after only 14 seconds. The Colts avoided kicking to Hester for the rest of the game, allowing him only one punt return, and choosing to squib kick whenever Hester was in the deep kickoff return position.

On the Colts' first drive of the game, Bears safety Chris Harris intercepted a deep third-down pass from quarterback Peyton Manning and returned it 6 yards to the Bears' 35-yard line. However, the Bears could not gain a first down on their ensuing possession and they were forced to punt. After several short runs and passes, Manning beat the Bears' defense with a 53-yard touchdown pass to wide receiver Reggie Wayne, cutting the Bears' lead to 7–6 after punter/holder Hunter Smith fumbled the snap on the extra point attempt. The touchdown occurred because of a mental error on the Bears' secondary defense. Cornerback Charles Tillman passed Wayne onto safety Danieal Manning. However, Manning chose to follow tight end Ben Utecht over the middle, leaving Wayne all alone. On the ensuing kickoff, Bears tight end Gabe Reid fumbled Adam Vinatieri's bouncing kickoff while being tackled by defensive end Robert Mathis; linebacker Tyjuan Hagler recovered the loose ball for the Colts on the Bears' 34-yard line. However, on the next play, the Colts gave the ball right back when running back Joseph Addai fumbled the hand-off and defensive end Mark Anderson recovered it for the Bears.

On the first play after the turnover, running back Thomas Jones' 52-yard run set up 1st-and-goal at the Colts' 5-yard line. Three plays later, quarterback Rex Grossman threw a 4-yard touchdown pass to wide receiver Muhsin Muhammad, increasing the Bears' lead to 14–6. After forcing a Colts punt, the Bears turned the ball over again when safety Bob Sanders forced a fumble on running back Cedric Benson, with defensive end Dwight Freeney making the recovery on the Bears' 43-yard line. The Colts subsequently advanced to the 36-yard line, but decided to punt rather than risk a 53-yard field goal attempt.

=== Second quarter ===
After forcing a Bears punt, the Colts drove 47 yards and scored with Vinatieri's 29-yard field goal to cut their deficit to 14–9. The Bears were forced to punt again on their next drive, and wide receiver Terrence Wilkins returned the ball 12 yards to his own 42-yard line. Manning started out the drive with a 22-yard completion to wide receiver Marvin Harrison. His next pass went to tight end Dallas Clark for 17 yards. Two more completions moved the ball to the Bears' 11-yard line, and then running back Dominic Rhodes took the ball to the end zone with three consecutive carries, the last one a 1-yard touchdown run to give his team a 16–14 lead with 6:09 left in the half.

After yet another Bears punt, the Colts advanced to the Bears' 36-yard line before Tillman ended the drive by forcing and recovering a fumble from tight end Bryan Fletcher. But on the next play, Grossman fumbled the snap, and defensive tackle Raheem Brock recovered the ball for Indianapolis. A reception and a run for 18 total yards by Rhodes led the Colts to the Bears' 17-yard line. With two seconds left, Vinatieri attempted a 36-yard field goal, but his kick sailed wide left, and the Colts' lead remained 16–14 at halftime.

=== Third quarter ===
Wilkins returned the second half kickoff 26 yards to the Colts' 38-yard line. On the ensuing possession, Addai rushed five times for 25 yards and caught four passes for 19 yards as the Colts drove 56 yards in 13 plays and scored on a 24-yard field goal by Vinatieri, increasing their lead to 19–14. On the Bears' next drive, Jones started out with a 14-yard run, and then Muhammad caught a 9-yard pass, bringing up 2nd-and-1 on the Colts' 45-yard line. But on the next play, Grossman was sacked for an 11-yard loss by defensive tackle Anthony McFarland. Then on third down, he fumbled the snap and recovered it himself, but the Bears were forced to punt, and Wilkins returned the ball 12 yards to the Colts' 36-yard line. Rhodes then gained 52 yards on three carries, with a face-mask penalty on Danieal Manning adding another 10 yards. The Bears managed to halt the drive at their own 2-yard line, but Vinatieri kicked a 20-yard field goal to increase the Colts' lead to 22–14.

Bears tight end John Gilmore picked up Vinatieri's bouncing kickoff and returned it 9 yards to his own 45-yard line, with an unnecessary roughness penalty on Mathis adding another 15 yards and giving the Bears a first down on the Colts' 40-yard line. The Bears could only gain 14 yards on three runs by Jones, but they were enough for kicker Robbie Gould to make a 44-yard field goal, cutting their deficit to 22–17.

=== Fourth quarter ===
After forcing the Colts to punt going into the fourth quarter, the Bears started on their own 20-yard line with 13:38 left in the game. But three plays later, cornerback Kelvin Hayden intercepted a pass intended for Muhammad and returned it 56 yards for a touchdown, increasing the Colts' lead to 29–17.

From that point on, the Colts held the Bears scoreless for the rest of the game. Four plays after the ensuing kickoff, Sanders intercepted Grossman's pass and returned it 38 yards to the Bears' 41-yard line. The Bears' defense eventually forced a punt, but Smith's 32-yard kick pinned the Bears back at their own 8-yard line. The Bears drove to their own 47, but on a fourth down conversion attempt, tight end Desmond Clark dropped a potential first down reception after being leveled by safety Matt Giordano. The Colts subsequently called eight consecutive runs by Rhodes before turning the ball over on downs themselves, leaving only 1:42 remaining in regulation. Afterwards, the Bears ran five meaningless plays to reach the Colts' 36-yard line before the game ended.

=== Box score ===
Super Bowl XLI: Indianapolis Colts 29, Chicago Bears 17

Quarter	1	2	3	4	Total
Colts (AFC)	6	10	6	7	29
Bears (NFC)	14	0	3	0	17

at Dolphin Stadium, Miami Gardens, Florida

- Date: February 4, 2007
- Game time: 6:25 p.m. EST
- Game weather: 67 °F (19 °C), rainy (Note: This was the first Super Bowl to be played in rain.)
- Game attendance: 74,512
- Referee: Tony Corrente
- TV announcers (CBS): Jim Nantz, Phil Simms, Steve Tasker, Solomon Wilcots, Sam Ryan, Lesley Visser
- Recap

Scoring summary

Quarter	Time	Drive			Team	Scoring information	Score	
Quarter	Time	Plays	Yards	TOP	Team	Scoring information	IND	CHI
1	14:46	—	—	—	CHI	Devin Hester 92-yard kickoff return for a touchdown, Robbie Gould kick good	0	7
1	6:50	9	80	4:30	IND	Reggie Wayne 53-yard touchdown reception from Peyton Manning, Adam Vinatieri kick no good (snap fumbled)	6	7
1	4:34	4	57	2:00	CHI	Muhsin Muhammad 4-yard touchdown reception from Rex Grossman, Gould kick good	6	14
2	11:17	8	47	3:52	IND	29-yard field goal by Vinatieri	9	14
2	6:09	7	58	3:08	IND	Dominic Rhodes 1-yard touchdown run, Vinatieri kick good	16	14
3	7:26	13	56	7:34	IND	24-yard field goal by Vinatieri	19	14
3	3:16	6	62	2:07	IND	20-yard field goal by Vinatieri	22	14
3	1:14	6	14	2:02	CHI	44-yard field goal by Gould	22	17
4	11:44	—	—	—	IND	Interception returned 56 yards for touchdown by Kelvin Hayden, Vinatieri kick good	29	17
"TOP" = time of possession. For other American football terms, see Glossary of American football.							29	17

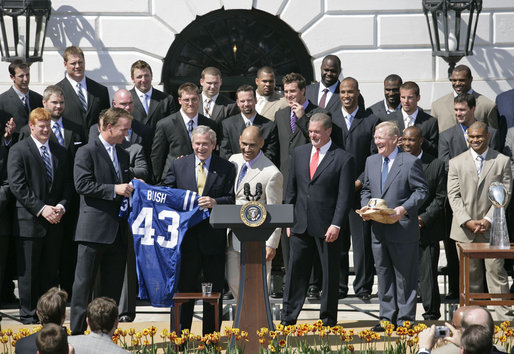
U.S. President George W. Bush congratulates the Colts on their win

=== Statistical overview ===
This was the third Super Bowl to have two players rush for more than 100 yards as Dominic Rhodes had 113 for the Colts and Thomas Jones had 112 for the Bears. Tony Dungy is the third man to win the Super Bowl as a head coach as well as a player, following Tom Flores and Mike Ditka.

For the Colts, Rhodes rushed for 113 yards and a touchdown, while also catching an 8-yard reception. Addai rushed for 77 yards and caught 10 passes for 66 yards. Wilkins returned four kickoffs for 89 yards and 3 punts for 42 yards in what turned out to be his final NFL game. Adam Vinatieri became the first kicker ever to play in five Super Bowls and the first to win four Super Bowl rings. Vinatieri's three field goals and two extra points gave him 49 points for the entire 2006 post-season, an NFL record. The Colts' win was the first major professional championship for Indiana since the Indiana Pacers' ABA title in the 1972–73 season.

Hester's touchdown for the Bears on the opening kickoff was the first one in Super Bowl history, and the ninth kick return for a touchdown in a Super Bowl; only three of the nine teams who did this went on to win the game (the Green Bay Packers in Super Bowl XXXI, the Baltimore Ravens in Super Bowls XXXV and XLVII, and the Seattle Seahawks in Super Bowl XLVIII). Hester's return also kept a streak alive for there being a kickoff return for a touchdown in each Super Bowl played at Dolphin Stadium. Hester's and Wayne's touchdowns in the first quarter marked the first time in Super Bowl history the first two touchdowns were scored by players from the same college (University of Miami). Jones was the Bears' top rusher with 112 yards, while also catching four passes for 18 yards. Desmond Clark was the Bears' top receiver with six receptions for 64 yards. Grossman completed 20 of 28 passes for 165 yards and a touchdown, with two interceptions, leaving him with a passer rating of 68.3 for the game. Muhsin Muhammad became the third player ever to score a touchdown in the Super Bowl for two teams, joining Ricky Proehl and Jerry Rice.

As mentioned previously, this was only the third time in Super Bowl history to have two 100 yard rushers. In Super Bowl III, Colts halfback Tom Matte and Jets fullback Matt Snell rushed for 116 and 121 yards, respectively. 22 years later in Super Bowl XXV, Bills halfback Thurman Thomas rushed for 135 yards while the Giants O.J. Anderson (the game's MVP) rushed for 102 yards.

== Final statistics ==
Sources: NFL.com Super Bowl XLI, Super Bowl XLI Play Finder Ind, Super Bowl XLI Play Finder Chi

=== Statistical comparison ===
	Indianapolis Colts	Chicago Bears
First downs	24	11
First downs rushing	12	3
First downs passing	11	8
First downs penalty	1	0
Third down efficiency	8/18	3/10
Fourth down efficiency	0/1	0/1
Net yards rushing	191	111
Rushing attempts	42	19
Yards per rush	4.5	5.8
Passing – Completions-attempts	25/38	20/28
Times sacked-total yards	1–8	1–11
Interceptions thrown	1	2
Net yards passing	239	154
Total net yards	430	265
Punt returns-total yards	3–42	1–3
Kickoff returns-total yards	4–89	6–138
Interceptions-total return yards	2–94	1–6
Punts-average yardage	4–40.5	5–45.2
Fumbles-lost	2–2	4–3
Penalties-yards	6–40	4–35
Time of possession	38:04	21:56
Turnovers	3	5

=== Individual statistics ===
Colts passing
	C/ATT^{1}	Yds	TD	INT	Rating
Peyton Manning	25/38	247	1	1	81.8
Colts rushing
	Car^{2}	Yds	TD	LG^{3}	Yds/Car
Dominic Rhodes	21	113	1	36	5.38
Joseph Addai	19	77	0	14	4.05
Dallas Clark	1	1	0	1	1.00
Peyton Manning	1	0	0	0	0.00
Colts receiving
	Rec^{4}	Yds	TD	LG^{3}	Target^{5}
Joseph Addai	10	66	0	12	10
Marvin Harrison	5	59	0	22	11
Dallas Clark	4	36	0	17	6
Reggie Wayne	2	61	1	53	4
Bryan Fletcher	2	9	0	6	2
Dominic Rhodes	1	8	0	8	2
Ben Utecht	1	8	0	8	2
Aaron Moorehead	0	0	0	0	1

Bears passing
	C/ATT^{1}	Yds	TD	INT	Rating
Rex Grossman	20/28	165	1	2	68.3
Bears rushing
	Car^{2}	Yds	TD	LG^{3}	Yds/Car
Thomas Jones	15	112	0	52	7.47
Rex Grossman	2	0	0	0	0.00
Cedric Benson	2	–1	0	4	–0.50
Bears receiving
	Rec^{4}	Yds	TD	LG^{3}	Target^{5}
Desmond Clark	6	64	0	18	9
Bernard Berrian	4	38	0	14	7
Thomas Jones	4	18	0	14	4
Muhsin Muhammad	3	35	1	22	4
Jason McKie	2	8	0	4	2
Rashied Davis	1	2	0	2	2

^{1}Completions/attempts ^{2}Carries ^{3}Long gain ^{4}Receptions ^{5}Times targeted

== Starting lineups ==
Hall of Fame‡

Indianapolis	Position	Position	Chicago
Offense
Reggie Wayne	WR		Muhsin Muhammad
Tarik Glenn	LT		John Tait
Ryan Lilja	LG		Ruben Brown
Jeff Saturday	C		Olin Kreutz
Jake Scott	RG		Roberto Garza
Ryan Diem	RT		Fred Miller
Dallas Clark	TE		Desmond Clark
Marvin Harrison‡	WR		Bernard Berrian
Peyton Manning‡	QB		Rex Grossman
Dominic Rhodes	RB		Thomas Jones
Ben Utecht	H-B	FB	Jason McKie
Defense
Robert Mathis	LE		Adewale Ogunleye
Booger McFarland	LDT		Tank Johnson
Raheem Brock	RDT		Ian Scott
Dwight Freeney‡	RE		Alex Brown
Cato June	WLB		Lance Briggs
Gary Brackett	MLB		Brian Urlacher‡
Rob Morris	SLB		Hunter Hillenmeyer
Nick Harper	LCB		Charles Tillman
Jason David	RCB		Nathan Vasher
Antoine Bethea	SS		Chris Harris
Bob Sanders	FS		Danieal Manning

== Officials ==
- Referee: Tony Corrente #99 (first Super Bowl)
- Umpire: Carl Paganelli #124 (second Super Bowl, also XXXIX, XLVI and XLVIII)
- Head linesman: George Hayward #54 (first Super Bowl)
- Line judge: Ron Marinucci #107 (first Super Bowl)
- Field judge: Jim Saracino #58 (first Super Bowl)
- Side judge: John Parry #132 (first Super Bowl, also XLVI and LIII as referee)
- Back judge: Perry Paganelli #46 (first Super Bowl, also LII)
- Alternate referee: Jeff Triplette #42
- Alternate umpire: Butch Hannah #40
- Alternate line judge: Carl Johnson #101
- Alternate field judge: Buddy Horton #82
- Alternate back judge: Richard Reels #83

== Controversies prohibiting fan parties and presentations ==
=== Prohibiting tailgating ===
The NFL upset many fans by banning the traditional practice of tailgating at Super Bowl XLI. Originally, spokesmen for Dolphin Stadium announced that tailgating would be permitted as usual. However, the NFL quickly contradicted this statement, announcing an NFL owner-imposed ban on all tailgating and prohibiting non-ticketed fans within a two-block-radius of the stadium.

=== Prohibiting church display ===
The NFL upset a large number of fans by threatening churches with lawsuits if they had Super Bowl parties. National Football League assistant counsel Rachel L. Margolies sent a letter to the Fall Creek Baptist Church in Indianapolis, ordering the church to cancel its party and remove the trademarked Super Bowl name from its website. She said that the church could not use the words "Super Bowl" as it violates trademark law, could not charge admission as that violates copyright law, could not use its projection screen (only one television could be used and it could not be over 55 inches), and could not "promote a message" in connection with the game. Regarding the last point, the Fall Creek Baptist church planned to also show an extra video to highlight the Christian testimonies of Colts coach Tony Dungy and Chicago Bears coach Lovie Smith. "While this may be a noble message", Rachel L. Margolies wrote, "we are consistent in refusing the use of our game broadcasts in connection with events that promote a message, no matter the content." Sports bars nationwide were allowed to show the game, as were businesses that televised sports as part of their everyday operations because they did not charge admission and they left the message the NFL intended intact.

The Indianapolis Star picked up the story, and soon pastors across the U.S. were working to cancel their parties. Immediately the NFL received a backlash of bad publicity, with indignant football fans in constant sarcasm (akin to rules imposed about on-field behavior i.e. taunting opposition teams) referring to the NFL as the "No Fun League." For example, the enforcement of this policy earned the NFL a "Worst Person in the World" silver on the edition of February 2, 2007, of Countdown with Keith Olbermann.

After a long series of bad press, the NFL issued a written statement clarifying their policy, saying that they did not object to churches hosting Super Bowl parties so long as they did not charge admission and showed the game on "a television of the type commonly used at home". This statement did not attempt to forbid coordination of any other message with the game, something typically done by churches, nor did it attempt to forbid the use of the term "Super Bowl."
