= Television in Serbia =

Television in Serbia was introduced in 1958. It remains the most popular of the media in Serbia—according to 2009 survey, Serbian people watch on average 6 hours of television per day, making it the highest average in Europe.

== Free-to-air terrestrial television ==
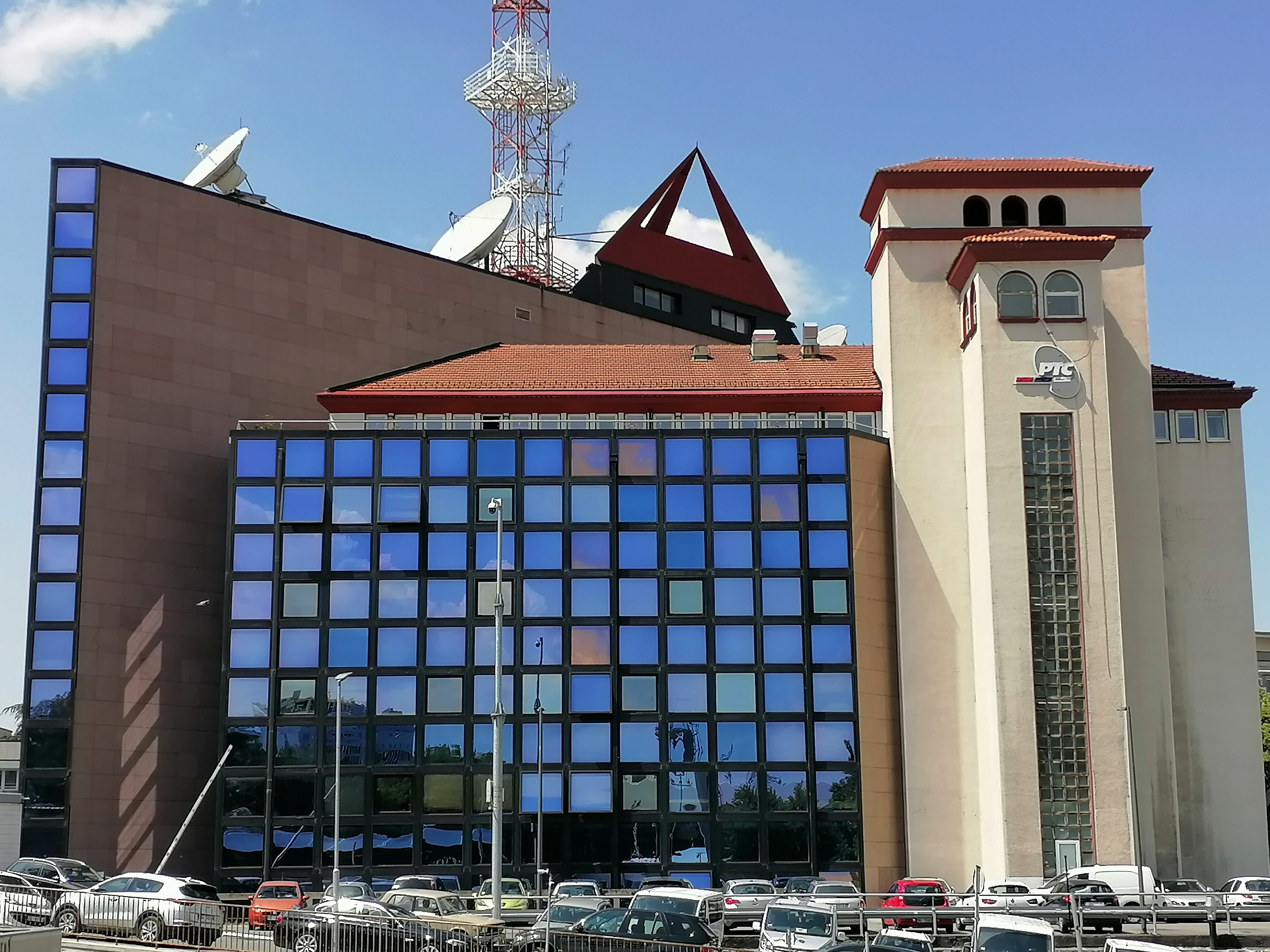
Headquarters of the national public media service Radio Television of Serbia (RTS)

Digital television transition has been completed in 2015 with MPEG-4 compression standard and DVB-T2 standard for signal transmission.

=== National broadcasting ===
Serbia has a total of 7 national free-to-air channels, which can be viewed throughout the country. These are RTS 1, RTS 2 and RTS 3 from the country’s public network Radio Television of Serbia, as well as private channels Prva, B92, Pink and Happy.

=== Regional and local broadcasting ===
There are 28 regional and 74 local television channels. Serbia’s northern province, Vojvodina, has a public broadcaster, Radio Television of Vojvodina. It airs 2 channels throughout Vojvodina – RTV1 and RTV2. Via pay tv services those 2 channels can be viewed throughout Serbia, like many regional broadcasters. One of the largest and most watched regional broadcasters is Studio B, which airs across Belgrade's metropolitan area.

== Pay television ==
Some 67% of households are provided with pay television services (i.e. 38.7% cable television, 16.9% IPTV, and 10.4% satellite). There are 90 pay television operators (cable, IPTV, DTH), largest of which are SBB (mainly cable) with 48% market share, Telekom Srbija (mts TV) with 25%, followed by PoštaNet with 5%, and Ikom and Kopernikus with 4% and 3%, respectively.

=== Cable television ===
Nearly 39% of households in Serbia have cable television. As a result there are many cable television companies, by far the largest of which is SBB. Cable operators offer not only Serbian channels in their packages but also foreign channels - on average there are 90 channels in basic cable packages.

=== Internet protocol television ===
About 17% of households have IPTV. First IPTV was successfully launched in 2008 by Telekom Srbija and its IPTV service, called mts TV, is today by far the largest IPTV platform in terms of numbers of subscribers. In 2013 SBB has launched an OTT service called D3i.

=== Satellite television ===
There are 10.4% of households equipped with satellite dishes. Three dominant DTH services are: SBB platform called Total TV, followed by Polaris (owned by Bulgarian Bulsatcom) and Digi TV (owned by Romanian RCS & RDS).

== List of channels ==
=== Public channels broadcasting nationally ===
Channel	Logo	Notes
RTS 1		First television channel in Serbia launched on 23 August 1958 as Televizija Beograd or TVB (Television Belgrade).
RTS 2		First colour channel in Serbia launched on the last day of 1971 as Televizija Beograd 2 (TVB2).
RTS 3		Channel began broadcasting on 26 November 2008 in DVB-T format in Belgrade and Novi Sad area, since 21 March 2012 it was available across Serbia over trial DVB-T2 network.

=== Private channels broadcasting nationally ===
Channel	Logo	Notes
B92		Launched on October 6, 2000. From 2017 to 2020, it was rebranded as O2.TV.
Happy		Launched on August 22, 1998. Rebranded as Happy in 2010.
Pink		RTV Pink launched on September 16, 1994 at 8pm. It has since become significant media group which owns several television networks across the Balkans.
Prva		Prva launched on December 31, 2006 at 7pm as FOX. It is part of Greek Antenna Group since December 2009. On September 20, 2010 at 6pm it changed its name to Prva.

=== Public channels broadcasting regionally ===
Channel	
RTV 1	First launched as Radio Television Novi Sad (RTNS 1) the network was renamed to Radio Television of Vojvodina in 2006. It is broadcast across Serbia's province of Vojvodina. It can also be seen throughout Serbia via pay television services.
RTV 2	RTV 2 caters mostly for the minority groups living in the Serbian province of Vojvodina with a large number of foreign language content. It can only be seen in Vojvodina and is not broadcast via pay television services to the rest of Serbia.

=== Private channels broadcasting regionally ===
There are 27 private channels broadcasting with a regional licence. Due to pay television services being widely used across the country, many local and regional channels can be viewed throughout the country.

Channel	Notes
Regionalna TV	Airs from Novi Pazar
SAT TV	Airs from Požarevac
TV Banat	Airs from Vršac
TV Belle Amie	Airs from Niš
TV Bor	Airs from Bor
TV Enigma	Airs from Prijepolje
Info Kanal	Airs from Subotica
TV K23	Airs from Subotica
TV Kanal 9	Airs from Kragujevac
TV Kikinda	Airs from Kikinda
RTV Kragujevac	Airs from Kragujevac
TV Kraljevo	Airs from Kraljevo
TV Kruševac	Airs from Kruševac
TV Leskovac	Airs from Leskovac
TV Lav plus	Airs from Užice
TV Most	Airs from Novi Sad
TV Palma Plus	Airs from Jagodina
TV Panonija	Airs from Novi Sad
Pannon RTV	Airs from Subotica
TV Pirot	Airs from Pirot
TV Podrinje	Airs from Loznica
TV Raška	Airs from Raška
TV Santos	Airs from Zrenjanin
TV Studio MT	Airs from Leskovac
Sremska TV	Airs from Šid
TV Studio B	Airs from Belgrade
TV Šabac	Airs from Šabac
TV Vranje	Airs from Vranje
TV Vujić	Airs from Valjevo
TV YU Eco	Airs from Subotica
RTV Trstenik	Airs from Trstenik
TV Jasenica	Airs from Smederevska Palanka

=== Domestic pay-tv channels ===
- Arena Sport (available in HD)
- N1 (available in HD)
- Nova (Serbia) (available in HD)

=== International pay-tv channels ===
- Star Channel (available in HD)
- Star Crime (available in HD)
- Star Life (available in HD)
- Star Movies (available in HD)
- Star Comedy (available in HD)
- AXN
- AXN Spin
- CBS Drama
- Comedy Central Extra
- Universal
- Sci Fi
- HBO (available in HD)
- HBO 2 (available in HD)
- HBO 3 (available in HD)
- Cinemax (available in HD)
- Cinemax 2 (available in HD)
- CineStar
- CineStar Action
- Viasat Kino
- AMC
- Klasik TV
- Viasat Explorer
- Viasat History
- Viasat Nature
- Viasat Nature/History HD
- National Geographic (available in HD)
- Nat Geo Wild (available in HD)
- Discovery
- ID X (available in HD)
- Discovery Science (available in HD)
- Discovery Showcase HD
- Discovery World
- Animal Planet (available in HD)
- Travel Channel (available in HD)
- History (available in HD)
- H2
- CI
- CBS Reality
- Nickelodeon (available in HD)
- Nick Jr.
- Nicktoons
- Disney Channel
- Disney Junior
- JimJam
- Minimax
- Cartoon Network
- Cartoonito
- Duck TV
- Baby TV
- Eurosport (available in HD)
- Eurosport 2 (available in HD)
- Eurosport News
- Extreme Sports
- Motors TV
- Motorvision
- Fight Channel
- Fight Sports (available in HD)
- Fight Network (available in HD)
- Outdoor (available in HD)
- Trace Sport Stars HD
- Fashion TV (available in HD)
- World Fashion
- FLN
- E!
- TLC
- 24kitchen (available in HD)
- Food Network (available in HD)
- Ginx
- MTV
- MTV Live HD
- MTV Dance
- MTV Hits
- MTV Rocks
- VH1
- VH1 Classic
- Trace Urban (available in HD)
- Trace Tropical (available in HD)
- Mezzo
- Mezzo Live HD

== Viewership ==
Following is table of viewership for 7 national free-to-air channels:

Audience share % (4+)
Channel	2003	2004	2005	2006	2007	2008	2009	2010	2011	2012	2013	2014	2015	2016	2017	2018	2019	2020	2021	2022	2023
RTS 1	19.5	20.1	22.4	27.4	26.5	26.2	26.0	25.1	23.6	23.6	19.9	21.7	18.5	19.2	20.2	19.4	19.3	18.4	17.6	17.5	16.3
RTS 2	7.4	8.2	6.3	6.7	6.8	7.6	5.7	4.6	4.2	3.6	3.0	3.1	2.3	3.1	2.5	1.9	1.6	1.2	1.2	1.0	1.0
Pink	21.9	20.0	22.5	23.3	23.5	21.7	23.7	25.6	20.4	19.7	21.4	19.0	15.8	14.8	14.1	16.7	17.6	17.2	16.9	16.4	15.7
Fox / Prva	—N/a	—N/a	—N/a	—N/a	4.7	6.4	7.8	10.6	15.1	16.1	16.0	13.2	10.7	9.7	9.0	10.9	10.5	11.7	10.7	10.0	8.1
B92 / O2.TV	3.4	5.3	6.8	9.1	9.3	8.7	8.0	6.3	7.6	8.2	7.7	7.3	6.8	5.8	4.7	4.6	4.1	3.5	3.0	2.5	2.2
Happy	—N/a	—N/a	—N/a	—N/a	—N/a	—N/a	—N/a	5.4	4.3	2.8	4.1	4.7	9.8	7.9	9.4	8.3	6.9	6.8	7.8	7.9	7.5

== See also ==
- Media of Serbia
- List of Serbian language television channels
