= Radio Cetinje =

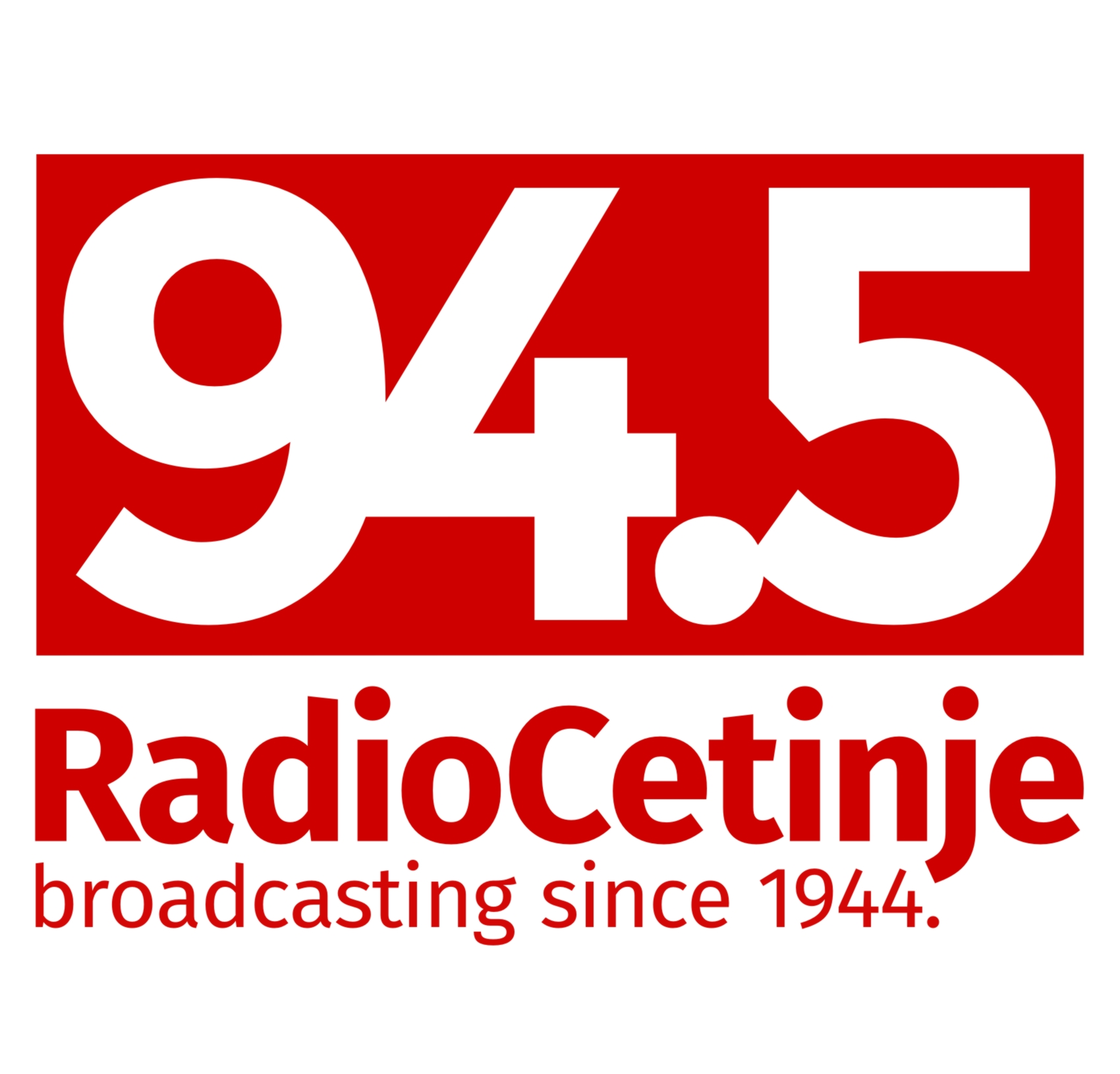
- Cetinje; Montenegro
- Frequency: 94.5 MHz

Programming
- Format: Public

Ownership
- Owner: RTV Cetinje

History
- First air date: November 27, 1944

Links
- Webcast: Listen Live
- Website: www.cetinjskilist.com

Radio Cetinje is the public radio station in Cetinje, Montenegro. It is the oldest electronic broadcaster in Montenegro, founded on 27 November 1944. Radio Cetinje is part of RTV Cetinje and operates via FM and Internet.

== History ==
Radio Cetinje was founded on 27 November 1944, two weeks after the liberation of Cetinje in World War II. During the first years, it broadcast news for the territories of central and coastal Montenegro and Sanjak towns.
In 1949, following the process of changing the administrative seat of Montenegro (instead of Cetinje, Podgorica became the capital of SR Montenegro), the radio station was moved to Podgorica. The new station was named Radio Titograd (old name for Podgorica), and Radio Cetinje was closed.
Radio Cetinje re-started its operation in 1992, as a public FM broadcaster. Since then, the radio has broadcast local political, cultural, and sports information, different shows and foreign and domestic music. From 2017, Radio Cetinje broadcasts program online.

== Program ==
Radio Cetinje offers a mixture of musical and informative programs 24 hours a day. It is one of rare radio stations in Montenegro which does not play folk music. The central program elements are local politics, educational, weather, traffic, cultural and sports information, as well as information on events taking place in Cetinje.
As well as their own production and music shows, Radio Cetinje broadcasts informative programs of Radio Free Europe and Radio Montenegro.

== See also ==
- Radio Television Cetinje
- Cetinje
