= RTV Šabac =

Television station in Šabac, Serbia

Radio Televizija Šabac
- Country: Serbia

History
- Launched: 1994

Links
- Website: www.sabac.tv

Radio Television Šabac (RTV Šabac; Serbian: Радио Телевизија Шабац or Radio Televizija Šabac) is one of four local television stations in Šabac, Serbia and regional television stations in Mačva, Pocerina and Podrinje Region. They are trying to become not only commercial but educational stations too.

== News and current affairs ==
- Jutrenje (morning programme)
- Vesti u tri (major bulletins at 15.00)
- Šabačka Hronika (show with news and current affairs from Šabac)
- Vesti (major bulletins at 19.00 and at 22.00)
