= Radio Pljevlja =

Radio Pljevlja is an FM radio station in Montenegro. Its headquarters are in Pljevlja.
