= List of Serbian-language television channels =

The List of Serbian-language television channels includes the following channels:

== Other countries ==
Country	Name	Owner	Notes
Austria	Pink Plus	Pink TV	Headquartered in Vienna, it mostly targets Serbian diaspora
Bosnia and Herzegovina	Radio Televizija Republike Srpske	RTRS	public broadcasting service of the Republika Srpska
Bosnia and Herzegovina	Nova BH	United Group	
Bosnia and Herzegovina	RTV BN		
Bosnia and Herzegovina	ATV Banja Luka		
Montenegro	Nova M	United Group	
