= RTV Nikšić =

Radio/TV station in Montenegro

Radio Televizija Nikšić (English: Radio Television Nikšić), abbreviated as RTNK, is a local radio-television company based in Nikšić, Montenegro. Founded in 1995, it is Montenegro's first local electronic media outlet. RTNK consists of three segments: Television, Radio, and an information web portal, and employs approximately 80 people. The primary mission of Radio Television Nikšić is to satisfy public interests by providing a wide range of content, including informative, educational, and documentary programs.

== Television Nikšić ==
Television Nikšić produces and broadcasts a variety of programs, including news, educational content, cultural shows, and documentaries. It is known for its high percentage of in-house production, with over 7,000 hours of both original and acquired content broadcast annually. The channel's programming is designed to provide accurate, timely, and comprehensive information to the public, emphasizing local news and events.

Television Nikšić boasts the highest percentage of in-house production in Montenegro, with 58.53% of its content being produced internally. This focus on in-house production allows for a high level of quality and relevance in its programming.

Television Nikšić is available in the Nikšić municipality via terrestrial signal and through cable operators such as Extra TV, M-tel, m:SAT, Orion Telekom, and Telemach.

== Radio Nikšić ==
Radio Nikšić complements the television segment by offering a wide range of radio programs that cater to different tastes and interests. It covers local news, cultural events, and provides entertainment through music and talk shows. The radio segment plays a crucial role in engaging with the community and addressing local issues. Radio Nikšić broadcasts on frequencies 89.8 MHz and 100 MHz, providing accessible and relevant content to its listeners.

== Portal rtnk.me ==
The information web portal, rtnk.me, serves as a digital extension of RTNK's media services, providing up-to-date news, articles, and multimedia content. The portal covers various topics, including politics, culture, sports, and lifestyle, ensuring that the audience has access to a broad spectrum of information online. With approximately 120,000 unique visitors monthly and around 400,000 visits, rtnk.me serves as a dynamic online space for content delivery, providing an accessible and interactive medium for the audience.

== Community Role and Engagement ==
Radio Television Nikšić plays a significant role in the local community, offering not only news and entertainment but also serving as a platform for local cultural and social issues. It provides a variety of programs aimed at different age groups and interests, ensuring a diverse audience. The station collaborates with local organizations and participates in community events, reinforcing its position as a key local institution.

== Commitment to Quality and Trust ==
Through its commitment to high-quality journalism and community engagement, Radio Television Nikšić continues to be a trusted and influential media outlet in Montenegro.

National Broadcasting and Trust: Radio Television Nikšić holds the status of a national broadcaster, meaning it has national coverage. According to research conducted by the Center for Monitoring and Research (CEMI) in 2023, it ranks third in trust among all types of media in Montenegro. Furthermore, it is the most-watched television station in Nikšić, based on research by De Facto Agency in 2022.

== Modernization efforts ==
In September 2024, the opening of a new, modern Radio Television Nikšić building marked the completion of the media's technical and organizational modernization. This new facility is expected to enhance the station's capabilities and improve the overall quality of its broadcasts.

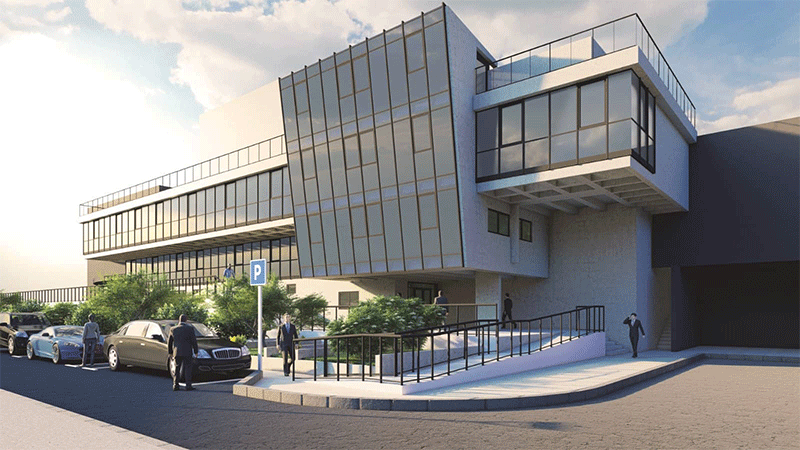
The newly inaugurated Radio Television Nikšić building, completed in September 2024, showcasing the modern architecture and advanced facilities that mark the media's technical and organizational modernization.

== Management team ==
- Executive director of Radio Television Nikšić: Nikola Marković
- Editor-In-Chief: Vladimir Utješinović
- Editor of Portal RTNK: Biljana Brašnjo
- Editor of Radio Nikšić: Lidija Džaković
