= Elmag RTV =

Montenegrin broadcasting corporation

Radio Television Elmag is a broadcasting company based in Podgorica, Montenegro. RTV Elmag consists of TV Elmag and Radio Elmag.

Radio Elmag was the first private FM radio station in Montenegro and is receivable throughout the country. Its transmission frequency in Podgorica is 96.00 FM.

The owner is Orhan Hodzic, president of Oki Air group. Radio Elmag won many awards and is considered as the best radio station in Montenegro.
