= Radio Crne Gore =

Радио Црне Горе Radio Crne Gore

National; Montenegro
- Broadcast area: Montenegro
- Frequencies: 94.9 MHz (Cetinje); 92.1, 94.0 MHz (Kolašin); 95.5, 96.5, 97.1 MHz (Podgorica); 101.8 MHz (Mojkovac); 96.8 MHz (Pljevlja); 94.6 MHz (Bijelo Polje); 89.5, 96.3 MHz (Rožaje); 89.1 MHz (Berane); 99.8 MHz (Bar); 92.2 MHz (Budva); 97.3 MHz (Ulcinj); 89.9 MHz (Plav); 96.1 MHz (Žabljak); 88.0 MHz (Nikšić)

Programming
- Format: Public, generalist

Ownership
- Owner: Radio Televizija Crne Gore (RTCG)

History
- First air date: 27 November 1944; 81 years ago
- Former names: Radio Titograd (until 1990)

Links
- Webcast: Slušaj uživo
- Website: www.rtcg.me

Radio Crne Gore is a radio station in Montenegro that is part of Radio Televizija Crne Gore (Radio-Television of Montenegro). Radio Crne Gore broadcasts from Podgorica.

== History ==
In 1949, Radio Titograd was formed. In 1963, RTV Titograd was established, making Radio Titograd a part of it. In 1990, Radio Titograd changed its name to Radio Crne Gore. RTV Titograd eventually was renamed to Radio Televizija Crne Gore, making Radio Crna Gora a part of it ever since.

== Radio Montenegro Trophy ==
In 2014, Football Association of Montenegro, together with Radio Montenegro founded Radio Montenegro Trophy, commemorating the 70th anniversary of the radio. The trophy is awarded to best scorer of the Montenegrin First League.
