= 1987 in Australian soccer =

Soccer in Australia
- Season: 1987

Men's soccer
- National Soccer League: APIA Leichhardt
- NSL Cup: Sydney Croatia

The 1987 season was the 18th season of national competitive soccer in Australia and 104th overall.

== National teams ==
=== Australia men's national soccer team ===
==== Results and fixtures ====
===== 1988 OFC Men's Olympic Qualifying Tournament =====
====== First round ======
15 November 1987	Chinese Taipei	0–3	Australia	Taipei, Taiwan
		Report	Arnold 21', 50'; Farina 53'

===== 1987 President's Cup International Football Tournament =====
====== Group B ======
Pos	Team	Pld	W	D	L	GF	GA	GD	Pts	Qualification
1	Australia	5	4	1	0	10	1	+9	9	Advance to knockout stage
2	South Korea B	5	3	1	1	6	5	+1	7	Advance to knockout stage
3	Fortuna Sittard	5	1	3	1	5	8	−3	5	
4	Morocco	5	2	0	3	6	6	0	4	
5	Chile B	5	1	2	2	3	6	−3	4	
6	Shamrock Rovers	5	0	1	4	0	4	−4	1	

Source: RSSSF

9 June 1987	Australia	1–0	Morocco	Gangneung, South Korea
	Farina 55'	Report

====== Knockout stage ======
19 June 1987 Semi-finals	Australia	0–0 (a.e.t.) (4–3 p)	Egypt	Seoul, South Korea
		Report		Stadium: Seoul Olympic Stadium
	Penalties
	(penalty missed) Crino		Abdel-Hamid (penalty missed); Youssef (penalty missed)

21 June 1987 Final	South Korea	1–1 (a.e.t.) (5–4 p)	Australia	Seoul, South Korea
	Kim Pan-keun 72'	Report	Arnold 83'	Stadium: Seoul Olympic Stadium
	Penalties
	Chung Hae-won (penalty scored); Choi Soon-ho (penalty missed); Kim Pan-keun (penalty scored); Kim Sam-soo (penalty scored); Kim Joo-sung (penalty scored); Yeo Bum-kyu (penalty scored)		(penalty scored) Crino; (penalty scored) Yankos; (penalty scored) Davidson; (penalty missed) Farina; (penalty scored) Dunn; (penalty missed) Raskopoulos

===== 1987 Trans-Tasman Cup =====
2 September 1987	Australia	1–1	New Zealand	Melbourne, Australia
	Zinni 68'	Report	Ironside 82'	Stadium: Olympic Park; Attendance: 5,000; Referee: Chris Bambridge (Australia)

9 September 1987	New Zealand	1–0	Australia	Lower Hutt, New Zealand
	de Jong 18'	Report		Stadium: Hutt Recreation Ground; Attendance: 5,000; Referee: Gary Fleet

=== Australia women's national soccer team ===
==== Results and fixtures ====
===== 1987 Women's World Invitation Tournament =====
====== Preliminary round ======
Pos	Team	Pld	W	D	L	GF	GA	GD	Pts	Qualification
1	Australia	3	2	0	1	8	1	+7	4	Qualification for tournament proper
2	Canada	3	2	0	1	4	2	+2	4	Qualification for tournament proper
3	Chinese Taipei B	3	2	0	1	4	2	+2	4	
4	Hong Kong	3	0	0	3	0	11	−11	0	

Source: RSSSF

12 December 1987	Australia	2–0	Canada	Kaohsiung, Taiwan
	Oakley ?', ?'	Report

13 December 1987	Australia	6–0	Hong Kong	Kaohsiung, Taiwan
	Iserief ?', ?'; Priestley ?', ?'; Monteath ?'; Murray ?'	Report

====== Tournament proper ======
Pos	Team	Pld	W	D	L	GF	GA	GD	Pts
1	Chinese Taipei	5	5	0	0	8	1	+7	10
2	United States	5	3	0	2	12	3	+9	6
3	SSG Bergisch Gladbach	5	3	0	2	4	2	+2	6
4	New Zealand	5	3	0	2	3	2	+1	6
5	Canada	5	0	1	4	0	8	−8	1
6	Australia	5	0	1	4	0	11	−11	1

Source: RSSSF

15 December 1987	Chinese Taipei	2–0	Australia	Taipei, Taiwan
	Iserief ?', ?'; Priestley ?', ?'; Monteath ?'; Murray ?'	Report

16 December 1987	United States	6–0	Australia	Taipei, Taiwan
		Report

17 December 1987	Canada	0–0	Australia	Taipei, Taiwan
		Report

19 December 1987	New Zealand	1–0	Australia	Taipei, Taiwan
		Report

=== Australia men's national under-20 soccer team ===
==== Results and fixtures ====
===== 1987 FIFA World Youth Championship =====
====== Group A ======
Pos	Team	Pld	W	D	L	GF	GA	GD	Pts	Qualification
1	Yugoslavia	3	3	0	0	12	3	+9	6	Advance to knockout stage
2	Chile (H)	3	2	0	1	7	4	+3	4	Advance to knockout stage
3	Australia	3	1	0	2	2	6	−4	2	
4	Togo	3	0	0	3	1	9	−8	0	

Source: RSSSF
(H) Hosts

11 October 1987	Togo	0–2	Australia	Santiago, Chile
17:00		Report	Edwards 7'; Reynolds 13'	Stadium: Estadio Nacional; Attendance: 15,000; Referee: Abdullah Al Nasir (Saudi Arabia)

14 October 1987	Yugoslavia	4–0	Australia	Santiago, Chile
17:00	Brnović 7'; Šuker 22', 71'; Boban 67'	Report		Stadium: Estadio Nacional; Attendance: 20,000; Referee: Mohamed Hansal (Algeria)

17 October 1987	Chile	2–0	Australia	Santiago, Chile
17:00	Pino 22', 52'	Report		Stadium: Estadio Nacional; Attendance: 75,000; Referee: Emilio Soriano Aladrén (Spain)

=== Australia men's national under-17 soccer team ===
==== Results and fixtures ====
===== 1987 FIFA U-16 World Championship =====
====== Group C ======
Pos	Team	Pld	W	D	L	GF	GA	GD	Pts	Qualification
1	Australia	3	2	0	1	3	4	−1	4	Advance to knockout stage
2	France	3	1	1	1	4	3	+1	3	Advance to knockout stage
3	Saudi Arabia	3	1	1	1	2	1	+1	3	
4	Brazil	3	0	2	1	0	1	−1	2	

Source: RSSSF

13 July 1987	Saudi Arabia	0–1	Australia	Montreal, Canada
20:00		Report	Horvat 71'	Stadium: Complexe sportif Claude-Robillard; Attendance: 5,400; Referee: Tony Evangelista (Canada)

15 July 1987	France	4–1	Australia	Montreal, Canada
20:00	Debève 14', 23', 31'; Rincon 24' (pen.)	Report	Georgakis 73'	Stadium: Complexe sportif Claude-Robillard; Attendance: 4,400; Referee: Simon Bantsimba (Congo)

17 July 1987	Brazil	0–1	Australia	Montreal, Canada
18:00		Report	Richardson 74'	Stadium: Complexe sportif Claude-Robillard; Attendance: 5,400; Referee: Lee Do-Ha (South Korea)

====== Knockout stage ======
19 July 1987 QF	Australia	0–1	Nigeria	Montreal, Canada
14:00		Report	Nwosu 59'	Stadium: Complexe sportif Claude-Robillard; Attendance: 5,200; Referee: Tony Evangelista (Canada)

== OFC competitions ==
=== Oceania Cup Winners' Cup ===
8 March 1987
15:30 UTC+12

North Shore United (New Zealand)	0–2	(Australia) Sydney City
	Report	Saad 29'; McCulloch 39'

Fuji Film Stadium, Auckland
Attendance: 1,000

=== Oceania Club Championship ===
15 March 1987

Adelaide City (Australia)	1–1	(New Zealand) Mount Wellington
Mullen 15'	Report	Whiteveen 20'
Penalties
	4–1

Hindmarsh Stadium, Adelaide
Attendance: 3,500
Referee: Don Campbell (Australia)

== Domestic soccer ==
=== National Soccer League ===
Pos	Team	Pld	W	D	L	GF	GA	GD	Pts	Qualification or relegation
1	APIA Leichhardt (C)	24	13	9	2	39	21	+18	35	Qualification for the Finals series (Note: The Finals series was not considered the championship for the 1987 National Soccer League.)
2	Preston Makedonia	24	11	7	6	32	22	+10	29	Qualification for the Finals series
3	St George-Budapest	24	12	5	7	31	24	+7	29	Qualification for the Finals series
4	Marconi Fairfield	24	11	5	8	41	25	+16	27	Qualification for the Finals series
5	Sydney Croatia	24	10	6	8	31	25	+6	26	Qualification for the Finals series
6	South Melbourne	24	9	7	8	32	34	−2	25	
7	Sydney Olympic	24	7	9	8	29	32	−3	23	
8	Brunswick Juventus	24	9	5	10	18	23	−5	23	
9	Melbourne Croatia	24	9	5	10	22	30	−8	23	
10	Adelaide City	24	6	10	8	29	23	+6	22	
11	Footscray JUST	24	7	8	9	17	27	−10	22	
12	Sunshine George Cross	24	3	9	12	26	42	−16	15	
13	Heidelberg United (R)	24	3	7	14	25	44	−19	13	Relegation to the Victorian State League
14	Sydney City	0	0	0	0	0	0	0	0	Withdrew

Updated to match(es) played on unknown. Source: rsssf.com
Rules for classification: 1) points; 2) goal difference; 3) number of goals scored.
(C) Champions; (R) Relegated

=== NSL Cup ===
==== Final ====
14 October 1987
19:30 AEDT

Sydney Croatia	1–0	South Melbourne
Slater 85'	Report

St George Stadium, Sydney
Attendance: 3,845
Referee: Rob Davies
18 October 1987
14:30 AEDT

South Melbourne	0–1	Sydney Croatia
	Report	Arnold ?'

Olympic Park, Melbourne
Attendance: 3,900

== Retirements ==
- 24 February 1987: Mark Jankovics, 30, former Australia, Saints and Marconi Fairfield striker.
