= Slaviša Đurković =

Montenegrin footballer (1968–2025)

Personal information
- Date of birth: 18 August 1968
- Place of birth: SFR Yugoslavia
- Date of death: 10 June 2025 (aged 56)
- Place of death: Nikšić, Montenegro
- Position: Defender

Youth career
- Sutjeska Nikšić

Senior career*
Years	Team	Apps	(Gls)
1987–1990	Sutjeska Nikšić	36	(3)
1990–1991	Leotar	21	(5)
- Jedinstvo Priština
- Budućnost Valjevo

International career
1987	Yugoslavia U20	2	(0)
Medal record
Representing Yugoslavia
Gold medal – first place	FIFA U-20 World Cup	1987
- * Club domestic league appearances and goals

Slaviša Đurković (Serbian: Славиша Ђурковић; 18 August 1968 – 10 June 2025) was a Montenegrin footballer who played as a defender.

== Career ==
Đurković played in the juvenile ranks of Sutjeska Nikšić and featured in the Yugoslavia U20 national team that won the title at the 1987 FIFA World Youth Championship. He stayed at Second league team Sutjeska, where his career did not prosper with the start of the Yugoslav Wars. Đurković joined Leotar and had spells with Jedinstvo and Budućnost.

Đurković started coaching FC Polet Stars and later he became the coach of Sutjeska Nikšić's youth academy. In 2011, he and former youth World Cup teammate Ranko Zirojević were denied a pension for their sport achievements by the Montenegrin authorities. In August 2011 he joined the UEFA A-license course for trainers.

== Death ==
Đurković died in Nikšić on 10 June 2025, at the age of 56.
