= Croatia at the 1998 FIFA World Cup =

At the 1998 FIFA World Cup Croatia participated in the event for the first time. The country went on to finish third.

== Qualifications ==
Croatia was drawn in Group A of UEFA's World Cup qualifications along with Bosnia and Herzegovina, Denmark, Greece, and Slovenia. Croatia finished second, behind Denmark, and qualified for the World Cup. The team had the following results:

Results
Date	Venue	Opponent	Score
October 8, 1996	Stadio Renato Dall'Ara, Bologna	Bosnia and Herzegovina	4:1
November 10, 1996	Maksimir Stadium, Zagreb	Greece	1:1
March 29, 1997	Poljud Stadium, Split	Denmark	1:1
April 2, 1997	Poljud Stadium, Split	Slovenia	3:3
April 30, 1997	Toumba Stadium, Thessaloniki	Greece	1:0
September 6, 1997	Maksimir Stadium, Zagreb	Bosnia and Herzegovina	3:2
September 10, 1997	Parken Stadium, Copenhagen	Denmark	1:3
October 11, 1997	Bežigrad Stadium, Ljubljana	Slovenia	3:1

The final standings were the following:

Team	Pts	Pld	W	D	L	GF	GA	GD
Denmark	17	8	5	2	1	14	6	8
Croatia	15	8	4	3	1	17	12	5
Greece	14	8	4	2	2	11	4	7
Bosnia and Herzegovina	9	8	3	0	5	9	14	-5
Slovenia	1	8	0	1	7	5	20	-15

=== Players ===
Team captain Zvonimir Boban is the only player that appeared in all 10 qualifying matches. Davor Šuker was top scorer with 5 goals. Ardian Kozniku, Petar Krpan, Anthony Šerić and Vladimir Vasilj did not appear in any of the qualifying matches but made the final World Cup squad.

Complete list of players in the qualifying matches

#	Name	Games Played	Goals
1	Zvonimir Boban	10	3
2	Davor Šuker	9	5
2	Alen Bokšić	9	4
2	Slaven Bilić	9	3
2	Aljoša Asanović	9	0
6	Goran Vlaović	8	2
6	Robert Jarni	8	0
8	Zvonimir Soldo	7	1
8	Dario Šimić	7	1
8	Goran Jurić	7	0
8	Dražen Ladić	7	0
12	Robert Prosinečki	6	1
12	Igor Cvitanović	6	0
14	Nikola Jerkan	4	0
14	Krunoslav Jurčić	4	0
16	Silvio Marić	3	1
16	Niko Kovač	3	0
16	Marjan Mrmić	3	0
16	Igor Štimac	3	0
20	Tomislav Erceg	2	0
20	Tonči Gabrić	2	0
20	Nenad Pralija	2	0
20	Mario Stanić	2	0
24	Nikola Jurčević	1	0
24	Zoran Mamić	1	0
24	Daniel Šarić	1	0
24	Igor Tudor	1	0

Source: Croatian Football Federation

Player was not selected for the 1998 FIFA World Cup squad

== World Cup squad ==
Head coach: Miroslav Blažević

No.	Pos.	Player	Date of birth (age)	Caps	Club
1	GK	Dražen Ladić	1 January 1963		Croatia Zagreb
2	FW	Petar Krpan	1 July 1974		(Croatia) NK Osijek
3	MF	Anthony Šerić	15 January 1979		(Croatia) Hajduk Split
4	DF	Igor Štimac	6 September 1967		(England) Derby County
5	DF	Goran Jurić	5 February 1963		Croatia Zagreb
6	DF	Slaven Bilić	11 September 1968		(England) Everton
7	MF	Aljoša Asanović	14 December 1965		(Italy) Napoli
8	MF	Robert Prosinečki	12 January 1969		Croatia Zagreb
9	FW	Davor Šuker	1 January 1968		(Spain) Real Madrid
10	MF	Zvonimir Boban	8 October 1968		(Italy) AC Milan
11	MF	Silvio Marić	20 March 1975		Croatia Zagreb
12	GK	Marijan Mrmić	6 May 1965		(Turkey) Beşiktaş
13	MF	Mario Stanić	10 April 1972		(Italy) Parma
14	DF	Zvonimir Soldo	2 November 1967		(Germany) VfB Stuttgart
15	DF	Igor Tudor	16 April 1978		(Croatia) Hajduk Split
16	FW	Ardian Kozniku	27 October 1967		(France) Bastia
17	MF	Robert Jarni	26 October 1968		(Spain) Real Betis
18	DF	Zoran Mamić	30 September 1971		(Germany) VfL Bochum
19	FW	Goran Vlaović	7 August 1972		(Spain) Valencia
20	DF	Dario Šimić	12 November 1975		Croatia Zagreb
21	MF	Krunoslav Jurčić	26 November 1969		Croatia Zagreb
22	GK	Vladimir Vasilj	6 July 1975		(Croatia) NK Hrvatski Dragovoljac

== Croatia at the World Cup ==
At the World Cup, Croatia was drawn into Group H along with Argentina, Jamaica, Japan. The team advanced to the round of sixteen, finishing in second place in the group. The team had the following results:

Team	Pts	Pld	W	D	L	GF	GA	GD
Argentina	9	3	3	0	0	7	0	+7
Croatia	6	3	2	0	1	4	2	+2
Jamaica	3	3	1	0	2	3	9	-6
Japan	0	3	0	0	3	1	4	-3

Croatia	3 - 1	Jamaica
Croatia	1 - 0	Japan
Croatia	0 - 1	Argentina

June 14, 1998

Jamaica	1 - 3 (1-1)	Croatia	21:00 - Stade Félix Bollaert, Lens; Ref: Vítor Pereira (Portugal); Attendance: 38,058
Earle 45'		Stanić 27'	21:00 - Stade Félix Bollaert, Lens; Ref: Vítor Pereira (Portugal); Attendance: 38,058
		Prosinečki 53'	21:00 - Stade Félix Bollaert, Lens; Ref: Vítor Pereira (Portugal); Attendance: 38,058
		Šuker 69'

June 20, 1998

Japan	0 - 1 (0-0)	Croatia	14:30 - Stade de la Beaujoire, Nantes; Ref: Ramesh Ramdhan (Trinidad and Tobago); Attendance: 35,500
		Šuker 77'	14:30 - Stade de la Beaujoire, Nantes; Ref: Ramesh Ramdhan (Trinidad and Tobago); Attendance: 35,500

June 26, 1998

Argentina	1 - 0 (1-0)	Croatia	16:00 - Parc Lescure, Bordeaux; Ref: Said Belqola (Morocco); Attendance: 31,800
Pineda 36'			16:00 - Parc Lescure, Bordeaux; Ref: Said Belqola (Morocco); Attendance: 31,800

Croatia went on to face the Romanian squad in the round of sixteen.

June 30, 1998

Romania	0 - 1 (0-1)	Croatia	16:30 - Parc Lescure, Bordeaux; Ref: Javier Castrilli (Argentina); Attendance: 31,800
		Šuker (p) 45'+2'	16:30 - Parc Lescure, Bordeaux; Ref: Javier Castrilli (Argentina); Attendance: 31,800

Croatia then played the heavily favoured German squad in the quarter-finals after their victory over Romania.

July 4, 1998

Germany	0 - 3 (0-1)	Croatia	21:00 - Stade Gerland, Lyon; Ref: Rune Pedersen (Norway); Attendance: 39,100
		Jarni 45'+3'	21:00 - Stade Gerland, Lyon; Ref: Rune Pedersen (Norway); Attendance: 39,100
		Vlaović 80'	21:00 - Stade Gerland, Lyon; Ref: Rune Pedersen (Norway); Attendance: 39,100
		Šuker 85'

After this surprise victory, Croatia played the host French team.

July 8, 1998

France	2 - 1 (0-0)	Croatia	21:00 - Stade de France, Saint-Denis; Ref: José Garcia Aranda (Spain); Attendance: 76,000
Thuram 47'		Šuker 46'	21:00 - Stade de France, Saint-Denis; Ref: José Garcia Aranda (Spain); Attendance: 76,000
Thuram 69'			21:00 - Stade de France, Saint-Denis; Ref: José Garcia Aranda (Spain); Attendance: 76,000

Croatia lost the match against France, ending their World Cup dreams. However, they advanced to the match for third place against the Netherlands.

July 11, 1998

Netherlands	1 - 2 (1-2)	Croatia	21:00 - Parc des Princes, Paris; Ref: Epifanio Gonzalez Chavez (Paraguay); Attendance: 45,500
Zenden 21'		Prosinečki 13'	21:00 - Parc des Princes, Paris; Ref: Epifanio Gonzalez Chavez (Paraguay); Attendance: 45,500
		Šuker 35'	21:00 - Parc des Princes, Paris; Ref: Epifanio Gonzalez Chavez (Paraguay); Attendance: 45,500

With this victory, Croatia finished in third, becoming the surprise of the tournament. Striker Davor Šuker also earned the tournament's Golden Boot for his six goals.
