= 1987 FIFA World Youth Championship =

Copa Mundial Juvenil de la FIFA Chile 1987

Tournament details
- Host country: Chile
- Dates: 10–25 October
- Teams: 16 (from 6 confederations)
- Venue: 4 (in 4 host cities)

Final positions
- Champions: Yugoslavia (1st title)
- Runners-up: West Germany
- Third place: East Germany
- Fourth place: Chile

Tournament statistics
- Matches played: 32
- Goals scored: 86 (2.69 per match)
- Attendance: 712,000 (22,250 per match)
- Top scorer: (West Germany) Marcel Witeczek (7 goals)
- Best player: (Socialist Federal Republic of Yugoslavia) Robert Prosinečki
- Fair play award: East Germany

The 1987 FIFA World Youth Championship took place in Chile from 10 to 25 October 1987. The 1987 championship was the 6th edition of the FIFA World Youth Championship and won for the first time by Yugoslavia. Remarkably, in the course of the tournament the Yugoslavs defeated each of the three other semi-finalists, and eliminated the defending champions Brazil. The tournament took place in four venues: Antofagasta, Valparaíso, Concepción and Santiago.

== Qualification ==
Confederation	Qualifying Tournament	Qualifier(s)
AFC (Asia)	1986 AFC Youth Championship	Bahrain^{1} Saudi Arabia
CAF (Africa)	1987 African Youth Championship	Nigeria; Togo^{1}
CONCACAF (North, Central America & Caribbean)	1986 CONCACAF U-20 Tournament	Canada; United States
CONMEBOL (South America)	Host nation	Chile^{1}
CONMEBOL (South America)	1987 South American Youth Championship	Brazil; Colombia
OFC (Oceania)	1986 OFC U-20 Championship	Australia
UEFA (Europe)	1986 UEFA European Under-18 Football Championship	Bulgaria; East Germany^{1} Italy; Scotland; West Germany; Yugoslavia

1.Teams that made their debut.

== Squads ==
For a list of all squads that played in the final tournament, see 1987 FIFA World Youth Championship squads

== Group stage ==
The 16 teams were split into four groups of four teams. Four group winners, and four second-place finishers qualify for the knockout round.

=== Group A ===
Pos	Team	Pld	W	D	L	GF	GA	GD	Pts	Group stage result
1	Yugoslavia	3	3	0	0	12	3	+9	6	Advance to knockout stage
2	Chile (H)	3	2	0	1	7	4	+3	4	Advance to knockout stage
3	Australia	3	1	0	2	2	6	−4	2	
4	Togo	3	0	0	3	1	9	−8	0	

(H) Hosts
10 October 1987
17:00

Chile	2–4	Yugoslavia
Tudor 17'; Pino 67'	(Report)	Boban 14'; Štimac 19'; Šuker 61', 63'

Estadio Nacional, Santiago
Attendance: 67,000
Referee: Juan Carlos Loustau (Argentina)

11 October 1987
17:00

Togo	0–2	Australia
	(Report)	Edwards 7'; Reynolds 13'

Estadio Nacional, Santiago
Attendance: 15,000
Referee: Abdullah Al Nasir (Saudi Arabia)

13 October 1987
17:00

Chile	3–0	Togo
Pino 8' (pen.); Tudor 32', 75'	(Report)

Estadio Nacional, Santiago
Attendance: 60,000
Referee: Vincent Mauro (United States)

14 October 1987
17:00

Yugoslavia	4–0	Australia
Brnović 7'; Šuker 22', 71'; Boban 67'	(Report)

Estadio Nacional, Santiago
Attendance: 20,000
Referee: Mohamed Hansal (Algeria)

17 October 1987
17:00

Chile	2–0	Australia
Pino 22', 52'	(Report)

Estadio Nacional, Santiago
Attendance: 75,000
Referee: Emilio Soriano Aladrén (Spain)

18 October 1987
17:00

Yugoslavia	4–1	Togo
Mijatović 20', 33'; Zirojević 53'; Šuker 84' (pen.)	(Report)	Ali 75'

Estadio Nacional, Santiago
Attendance: 12,000
Referee: Rune Larsson (Sweden)

=== Group B ===
Pos	Team	Pld	W	D	L	GF	GA	GD	Pts	Group stage result
1	Italy	3	2	1	0	5	2	+3	5	Advance to knockout stage
2	Brazil	3	2	0	1	5	1	+4	4	Advance to knockout stage
3	Canada	3	0	2	1	4	5	−1	2	
4	Nigeria	3	0	1	2	2	8	−6	1	

11 October 1987
17:00

Brazil	4–0	Nigeria
Alcindo 20'; André Cruz 29'; William 35', 62' (pen.)	(Report)

Estadio Municipal de Concepción, Concepción
Attendance: 27,000
Referee: Allan Gunn (England)

12 October 1987
17:00

Italy	2–2	Canada
Impallomeni 50' (pen.); Melli 82'	(Report)	Grimes 9'; Mobilio 44'

Estadio Municipal de Concepción, Concepción
Attendance: 13,500
Referee: Enrique Labo Revoredo (Peru)

14 October 1987
17:00

Brazil	0–1	Italy
	(Report)	Rizzolo 60'

Estadio Municipal de Concepción, Concepción
Attendance: 18,000
Referee: Rodolfo Martínez Mejía (Honduras)

15 October 1987
17:00

Nigeria	2–2	Canada
Effa 5'; Adekola 44'	(Report)	Jansen 6'; Domezetis 88'

Estadio Municipal de Concepción, Concepción
Attendance: 5,000
Referee: Soetoyo Hartasardjono (Indonesia)

17 October 1987
17:00

Brazil	1–0	Canada
André Cruz 82'	(Report)

Estadio Municipal de Concepción, Concepción
Attendance: 8,000
Referee: Octavio Sierra Mesa (Colombia)

18 October 1987
17:00

Nigeria	0–2	Italy
	(Report)	Carrara 23'; Melli 24'

Estadio Municipal de Concepción, Concepción
Attendance: 9,000
Referee: Guenther Abermann (East Germany)

=== Group C ===
Pos	Team	Pld	W	D	L	GF	GA	GD	Pts	Group stage result
1	East Germany	3	2	0	1	6	3	+3	4	Advance to knockout stage
2	Scotland	3	1	2	0	5	4	+1	4	Advance to knockout stage
3	Colombia	3	1	1	1	4	5	−1	3	
4	Bahrain	3	0	1	2	1	4	−3	1	

11 October 1987
17:00

East Germany	1–2	Scotland
Prasse 32'	(Report)	McLeod 30' (pen.); Butler 36'

Estadio Municipal de Valparaíso, Valparaíso
Attendance: 10,000
Referee: Arnaldo Coelho (Brazil)

12 October 1987
17:00

Colombia	1–0	Bahrain
Tréllez 10'	(Report)

Estadio Municipal de Valparaíso, Valparaíso
Attendance: 5,000
Referee: John B. Meachin (Canada)

14 October 1987
17:00

East Germany	3–1	Colombia
Sammer 9', 30', 70'	(Report)	Tréllez 90' (pen.)

Estadio Municipal de Valparaíso, Valparaíso
Attendance: 4,000
Referee: Rune Larsson (Sweden)

15 October 1987
17:00

Scotland	1–1	Bahrain
Nisbet 76'	(Report)	Al Kharraz 24'

Estadio Municipal de Valparaíso, Valparaíso
Attendance: 3,000
Referee: Badou Jasseh (Gambia)

17 October 1987
17:00

East Germany	2–0	Bahrain
Liebers 78'; Wosz 83'	(Report)

Estadio Municipal de Valparaíso, Valparaíso
Attendance: 2,000
Referee: Richard Lorenc (Australia)

18 October 1987
17:00

Scotland	2–2	Colombia
Wright 61'; McLeod 74' (pen.)	(Report)	Guerrero 48', 58'

Estadio Municipal de Valparaíso, Valparaíso
Attendance: 5,000
Referee: Claude Bouillet (France)

=== Group D ===
Pos	Team	Pld	W	D	L	GF	GA	GD	Pts	Group stage result
1	West Germany	3	3	0	0	8	1	+7	6	Advance to knockout stage
2	Bulgaria	3	2	0	1	3	3	0	4	Advance to knockout stage
3	United States	3	1	0	2	2	3	−1	2	
4	Saudi Arabia	3	0	0	3	0	6	−6	0	

11 October 1987
17:00

United States	0–1	Bulgaria
	(Report)	Trendafilov 26'

Estadio Regional de Antofagasta, Antofagasta
Attendance: 18,000
Referee: Jean-Fidele Diramba (Gabon)

12 October 1987
17:00

Saudi Arabia	0–3	West Germany
	(Report)	Epp 6'; Strehmel 27'; Witeczek 31'

Estadio Regional de Antofagasta, Antofagasta
Attendance: 8,000
Referee: Carlo Longhi (Italy)

14 October 1987
17:00

United States	1–0	Saudi Arabia
Unger 73'	(Report)

Estadio Regional de Antofagasta, Antofagasta
Attendance: 5,000
Referee: Stjepan Glavina (Yugoslavia)

15 October 1987
17:00

Bulgaria	0–3	West Germany
	(Report)	Witeczek 50' (pen.), 53'; Reinhardt 59'

Estadio Regional de Antofagasta, Antofagasta
Attendance: 8,000
Referee: Enrique Marín Gallo (Chile)

17 October 1987
17:00

United States	1–2	West Germany
Constantino 44'	(Report)	Witeczek 36'; Möller 73'

Estadio Regional de Antofagasta, Antofagasta
Attendance: 3,500
Referee: Toshikazu Sano (Japan)

18 October 1987
17:00

Bulgaria	2–0	Saudi Arabia
Slavchev 31'; Kalaydzhiev 37'	(Report)

Estadio Regional de Antofagasta, Antofagasta
Attendance: 8,000
Referee: Yi-Fa Chow (Chinese Taipei)

== Knockout stage ==
Quarter-finals
October 21 - Santiago
Yugoslavia	2
Brazil	1
October 21 - Valparaíso
East Germany	2
Bulgaria	0
October 21 - Concepción
Italy	0
Chile	1
October 21 - Antofagasta
West Germany (p)	1 (4)
Scotland	1 (3)

Semi-finals
October 23 - Santiago
Yugoslavia	2
East Germany	1
October 23 - Concepción
Chile	0
West Germany	4

Final
October 25 - Santiago
Yugoslavia (p)	1 (5)
West Germany	1 (4)
Third place
October 25 - Santiago
East Germany (p)	1 (3)
Chile	1 (1)

=== Quarter-finals ===
21 October 1987
16:15

Italy	0–1	Chile
	(Report)	Pino 73' (pen.)

Estadio Municipal de Concepción, Concepción
Attendance: 35,000
Referee: Rune Larsson (Sweden)

21 October 1987
16:15

East Germany	2–0	Bulgaria
Steinmann 70' (pen.); Wosz 83'	(Report)

Estadio Municipal de Valparaíso, Valparaíso
Attendance: 3,000
Referee: Allan Gunn (England)

21 October 1987
16:15

West Germany	1–1 (a.e.t.)	Scotland
Reinhardt 8'	(Report)	Nisbet 45'
Penalties
	4–3

Estadio Regional de Antofagasta, Antofagasta
Attendance: 4,000
Referee: Juan Carlos Loustau (Argentina)

21 October 1987
19:15

Yugoslavia	2–1	Brazil
Mijatović 52'; Prosinečki 89'	(Report)	Alcindo 44'

Estadio Nacional, Santiago
Attendance: 60,000
Referee: Emilio Soriano Aladrén (Spain)

=== Semi-finals ===
23 October 1987
16:15

Chile	0–4	West Germany
	(Report)	Eichenauer 9'; Dammeier 15'; Witeczek 36', 69'

Estadio Municipal, Concepción
Attendance: 36,000
Referee: Claude Bouillet (France)

23 October 1987
19:15

Yugoslavia	2–1	East Germany
Štimac 30'; Šuker 70'	(Report)	Sammer 49'

Estadio Nacional, Santiago
Attendance: 35,000
Referee: Richard Lorenc (Australia)

=== Third place play-off ===
25 October 1987
15:00

East Germany	1–1 (a.e.t.)	Chile
Kracht 73'	(Report)	González 84'
Penalties
Neitzel (penalty scored); Zimmerling (penalty scored); Jähnig (penalty scored)	3–1	(penalty scored) Pino; (penalty missed) Navarrete; (penalty missed) Estay; (penalty missed) González

Estadio Nacional, Santiago
Attendance: 65,000
Referee: Arnaldo Coelho (Brazil)

=== Final ===
25 October 1987
18:00

Yugoslavia	1–1 (a.e.t.)	West Germany
Boban 85'	(Report)	Witeczek 87' (pen.)
Penalties
Pavličić (penalty scored); Šuker (penalty scored); Brnović (penalty scored); Zirojević (penalty scored); Boban (penalty scored)	5–4	(penalty missed) Witeczek; (penalty scored) Strehmel; (penalty scored) Luginger; (penalty scored) Spyrka; (penalty scored) Reinhardt

Estadio Nacional, Santiago
Attendance: 65,000
Referee: Juan Carlos Loustau (Argentina)

== Result ==
1987 FIFA World Youth Championship winners

Yugoslavia
First title

== Awards ==
Golden Shoe	Golden Ball	Fair Play Award
(West Germany) Marcel Witeczek	(Socialist Federal Republic of Yugoslavia) Robert Prosinečki	East Germany

== Goalscorers ==
Marcel Witeczek of West Germany won the Golden Boot award for scoring seven goals. In total, 86 goals were scored by 51 different players, with none of them credited as own goal.

7 goals

- (West Germany) Marcel Witeczek

6 goals

- (Socialist Federal Republic of Yugoslavia) Davor Šuker

5 goals

- (Chile) Camilo Pino

4 goals

- (East Germany) Matthias Sammer

3 goals

- (Chile) Luka Tudor
- (Socialist Federal Republic of Yugoslavia) Predrag Mijatović
- (Socialist Federal Republic of Yugoslavia) Zvonimir Boban

2 goals

- (Brazil) Alcindo Sartori
- (Brazil) André Cruz
- (Brazil) William
- (Colombia) John Jairo Trellez
- (Colombia) Miguel Guerrero
- (East Germany) Dariusz Wosz
- (Italy) Alessandro Melli
- (Scotland) Joe McLeod
- (Scotland) Scott Nisbet
- (West Germany) Knut Reinhardt
- (Socialist Federal Republic of Yugoslavia) Igor Štimac

1 goal

- (Australia) Alistair Edwards
- (Australia) Kurt Reynolds
- (Bahrain) Mohamed Al Kharraz
- (Bulgaria) Dimitar Trendafilov
- (Bulgaria) Ivo Slavtchev
- (Bulgaria) Radko Kalaydjiev
- (Canada) Billy Domezetis
- (Canada) Domenic Mobilio
- (Canada) James Grimes
- (Canada) Steve Jansen
- (Chile) Pedro González Vera
- (East Germany) Jörg Prasse
- (East Germany) Heiko Liebers
- (East Germany) Rico Steinmann
- (East Germany) Torsten Kracht
- (Italy) Antonio Rizzolo
- (Italy) Marco Carrara
- (Italy) Stefano Impallomeni
- (Nigeria) David Adekola
- (Nigeria) Okon Ene Effa
- (Scotland) John Butler
- (Scotland) Paul Wright
- (Togo) Salissou Ali
- (United States) Christian Unger
- (United States) Michael Constantino
- (West Germany) Alexander Strehmel
- (West Germany) Andreas Möller
- (West Germany) Detlev Dammeier
- (West Germany) Henrik Eichenauer
- (West Germany) Thomas Epp
- (Socialist Federal Republic of Yugoslavia) Branko Brnović
- (Socialist Federal Republic of Yugoslavia) Ranko Zirojević
- (Socialist Federal Republic of Yugoslavia) Robert Prosinečki

== Final ranking ==
Pos	Team	Pld	W	D	L	GF	GA	GD	Pts	Final result
1	Yugoslavia	6	5	1	0	17	6	+11	11	Champions
2	West Germany	6	4	2	0	14	3	+11	10	Runners-up
3	East Germany	6	3	1	2	10	6	+4	7	Third place
4	Chile (H)	6	3	1	2	9	9	0	7	Fourth place
5	Italy	4	2	1	1	5	3	+2	5	Eliminated in Quarter-finals
6	Scotland	4	1	3	0	6	5	+1	5	Eliminated in Quarter-finals
7	Brazil	4	2	0	2	6	3	+3	4	Eliminated in Quarter-finals
8	Bulgaria	4	2	0	2	3	5	−2	4	Eliminated in Quarter-finals
9	Colombia	3	1	1	1	4	5	−1	3	Eliminated in Group stage
10	Canada	3	0	2	1	4	5	−1	2	Eliminated in Group stage
11	United States	3	1	0	2	2	3	−1	2	Eliminated in Group stage
12	Australia	3	1	0	2	2	6	−4	2	Eliminated in Group stage
13	Bahrain	3	0	1	2	1	4	−3	1	Eliminated in Group stage
14	Nigeria	3	0	1	2	2	8	−6	1	Eliminated in Group stage
15	Saudi Arabia	3	0	0	3	0	6	−6	0	Eliminated in Group stage
16	Togo	3	0	0	3	1	9	−8	0	Eliminated in Group stage

Source: rsssf.com
(H) Hosts
