= Robert Prosinečki =

Croatian footballer and manager (born 1969)

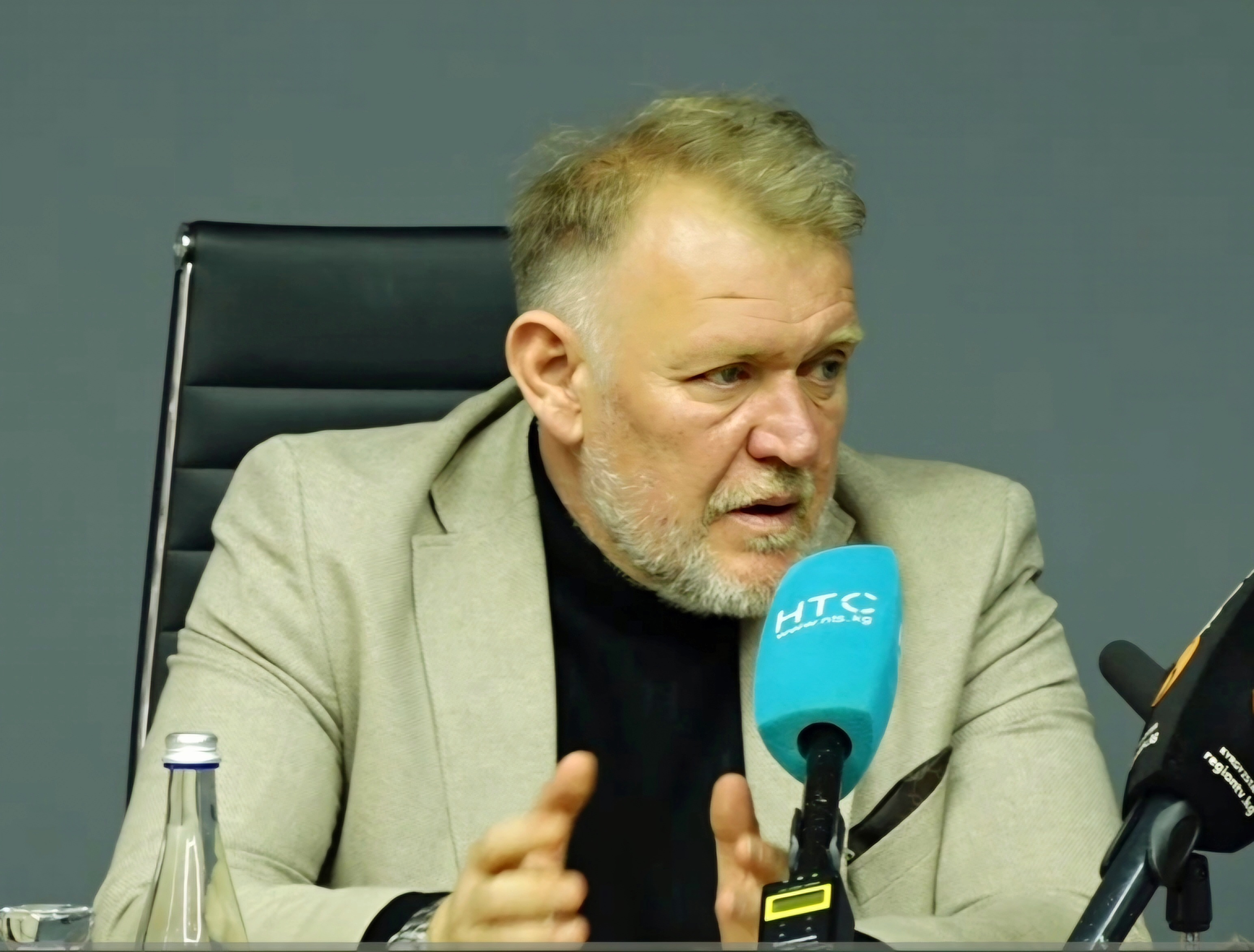
- Prosinečki as Kyrgyzstan manager in 2025

Personal information
- Date of birth: 12 January 1969 (age 57)
- Place of birth: Schwenningen, West Germany
- Height: 1.82 m (6 ft 0 in)
- Position: Midfielder

Youth career
- 1974–1980: Stuttgarter Kickers
- 1980–1986: Dinamo Zagreb

Senior career*
Years	Team	Apps	(Gls)
1986–1987	Dinamo Zagreb	2	(1)
1987–1991	Red Star Belgrade	117	(25)
1991–1995	Real Madrid	55	(10)
1994–1995	→ Oviedo (loan)	30	(5)
1995–1996	Barcelona	19	(2)
1996–1997	Sevilla	20	(4)
1997–2000	Croatia Zagreb	50	(14)
2000	Hrvatski Dragovoljac	4	(1)
2000–2001	Standard Liège	21	(4)
2001–2002	Portsmouth	33	(9)
2002–2003	Olimpija Ljubljana	23	(3)
2003–2004	NK Zagreb	26	(5)
2005	Savski Marof	4	(1)
Total		404	(84)

International career
1987	Yugoslavia U20	5	(1)
1989–1991	Yugoslavia	15	(4)
1994–2002	Croatia	49	(10)

Managerial career
- 2006–2010: Croatia (assistant)
- 2010–2012: Red Star Belgrade
- 2012–2014: Kayserispor
- 2014–2017: Azerbaijan
- 2018–2019: Bosnia and Herzegovina
- 2019–2020: Kayserispor
- 2020: Denizlispor
- 2022: Olimpija Ljubljana
- 2023: Rudeš
- 2024–2025: Montenegro
- 2025–2026: Kyrgyzstan
Medal record
Men's football
Representing Yugoslavia
FIFA U-20 World Cup
Winner	1987 Chile
UEFA European Under-21 Championship
Runner-up	1990
Representing Croatia
FIFA World Cup
Third place	1998 France
- * Club domestic league appearances and goals

Robert Prosinečki (Croatian pronunciation: [rǒbert prosinětʃkiː]; born 12 January 1969) is a professional football manager and former player who played as a midfielder. Born in West Germany, he represented Yugoslavia and later Croatia at international level.

Prosinečki began his senior career at Red Star Belgrade, winning three Yugoslav First League titles and the European Cup in 1991. He later played in Spain for Real Madrid, Barcelona, Oviedo and Sevilla. He subsequently won three Croatian league titles with Dinamo Zagreb, and also played in Belgium, England and Slovenia.

At international level, Prosinečki was named best player of the tournament as Yugoslavia won the 1987 FIFA World Youth Championship, and finished runner-up with the under-21 side at the 1990 European Championship. He was also voted Best Young Player at the 1990 FIFA World Cup. For Croatia, he won 49 caps between 1994 and 2002, featuring at UEFA Euro 1996 and the World Cups of 1998 and 2002, and helping the team to third place in 1998.

After retiring, Prosinečki served as assistant manager of the Croatia national team from 2006 to 2010 before being appointed manager of Red Star Belgrade in December 2010. He left in 2012 and, two months later, took charge of Turkish club Kayserispor. At international level, he coached the Azerbaijan national team from 2014 to 2017 and Bosnia and Herzegovina from 2018 to 2019. He later returned to manage Kayserispor and also coached Denizlispor, Olimpija Ljubljana and Rudeš.

== Early life and career ==
Prosinečki was born in Schwenningen, West Germany, into a family of Yugoslav gastarbeiters. His father Đuro Prosinečki (1939–2003) was a Croat, hailing from the Gornji Čemehovec village near Kraljevec na Sutli, and his mother Emilija Đoković is a Serb, originally from the Ježevica village near Čačak.

A few years after his birth, the family moved to Nürtingen near Stuttgart where, by the decision of his passionate football enthusiast father who ran a construction business for a living, five-year-old Robert was signed up for the Stuttgarter Kickers youth system. Closely monitored by his father, who reportedly drove him to and from every practice and watched his every match, the youngster progressed along in the club's youth categories. The parents decided to move back to the Zagorje region of SR Croatia within SFR Yugoslavia in 1979, bringing ten-year-old Robert and his two siblings along. Once in Croatia, just like in West Germany prior, his father Đuro signed up his adolescent son to the youth setup of Dinamo Zagreb and continued monitoring his progress closely.

== Club career ==
=== Dinamo Zagreb ===
After moving up the youth ranks for years, Prosinečki started getting occasional first team appearances during the 1986–87 league season under head coach Miroslav Blažević. On his league debut versus Željezničar on 2 November 1986, the seventeen-year-old managed to score in a 2–1 home win. By the end of the season, he recorded one more league appearance: playing the second half versus Sloboda Tuzla on 12 April 1987, a goalless home draw.

Wanting to secure his son's financial future, Prosinečki's father Đuro started pushing within the club hierarchy for a professional contract to be given to his eighteen-year-old son. However, coach Miroslav Blažević sent him away, once famously claiming while doing a guest spot on a local radio phone-in sports show that he would "eat his coaching diploma if Prosinečki ever became a proper football player".

=== Red Star Belgrade ===
In the summer of 1987, Đuro Prosinečki took 18-year-old Robert over to Belgrade and got the professional contract they were after. Dragan Džajić, Red Star's then technical director, remembers how the transfer got initiated:

[In late May 1987], during one of our away trips to Zagreb, we stayed at Hotel Esplanade where I got approached by a man who introduced himself as Robert Prosinečki's uncle. He told me his nephew wasn't happy at Dinamo and asked me if we could arrange a tryout. I told them to come to Belgrade in a couple of days and they did. At the tryout I saw this kid do wonders with the ball and I immediately asked our head coach Velibor Vasović to schedule an afternoon practice session at the main stadium so that I could see the kid one more time. It was obvious we had a classy player on our hands, and I initiated the contract proceedings right away. Our lawyer informed us that we wouldn't have to pay a transfer fee to Dinamo so Robert's father Đuro and I agreed everything in five minutes.

Despite evident quality and obvious technical ability, in order to further assess an unproven prospect who hadn't been on their radar, Red Star management reportedly also inquired about Prosinečki—as well as about the player-management relations and overall atmosphere within Dinamo—with their own defender Milivoj Bračun who had spent years at Dinamo before moving to Belgrade.

Within weeks, in late June 1987, as the league season ended and the summer transfer window opened, Prosinečki and his father went back to Belgrade where he took part in a few more training sessions with the Red Star Belgrade squad that was temporarily missing some of its marquee players such as Dragan Stojković, Boro Cvetković and newly-signed Refik Šabanadžović, who were in Zagreb competing at 1987 Universiade with the Yugoslavia national team. Furthermore, Prosinečki played a friendly match versus the recently promoted Second League side FK Rad. Satisfied again with his skills, technical director Džajić wanted to sign the professional contract right away, however, Prosinečki and his father wanted to go back to Zagreb one more time, ostensibly to get more of their personal belongings before coming back to sign. Afraid that young Prosinečki might try to leverage the accolades from his Belgrade tryouts in order to improve his standing back in Dinamo and possibly stay in Zagreb, Džajić insisted on contract being signed immediately, but eventually relented by taking Prosinečki's father's word that they will indeed come back to Belgrade and sign with Red Star.

After signing, young Prosinečki's initial accommodation—a room in Hotel Srbija—was paid for by the club.

==== 1987-88 season: immediate breakthrough, World Youth champion ====
Immediately upon joining his new club, Prosinečki started. Playing under head coach Vasović, the he secured a regular spot in Red Star's midfield alongside Dragan Stojković, Žarko Đurović and Goran Milojević just a few weeks into the 1987–88 league season, opening his Red Star scoring account in the process during only his second match for the club—a 7–1 home rout of Priština on 9 August 1987. Several weeks later on 6 September 1987 at the Večiti derbi against cross-town rival FK Partizan in front of 55,000 spectators at Stadion JNA, Prosinečki set up teammate Bora Cvetković with a long-distance through pass that the forward put away for a 1–3 lead early into the second half, putting the out of Partizan's reach.

In October 1987, he was part of the Yugoslav youth squad which won the World Youth Championship in Chile, with Prosinečki winning the Golden Ball award as the tournament's best player. Playing in Chile meant that he was away from the club for the entire month of October, and he was already held in such high regard at Red Star, that the club brass attempted to bring him back from South America after the tournament's group stages, so that he could play in their 1987–88 UEFA Cup second round tie versus Club Brugge. The Yugoslav team players protested to FIFA, and João Havelange, the organisation's chairman at the time, intervened to keep Prosinečki in Chile.

After Prosinečki's return from Chile to rejoin Red Star, the club's executive board decided to provide him with a two-bedroom apartment where the player moved to from his initial hotel accommodation.

During his four-year spell at the club, Prosinečki helped Red Star win three Yugoslav First League titles and one Yugoslav Cup, as well as participating in the club's greatest success in history by winning the 1991 European Cup.

=== Real Madrid ===
Prosinečki joined Spanish giants Real Madrid during the summer of 1991 for a transfer fee of ₧ 450 million (€15 million). Led by club president Ramón Mendoza and head coach Radomir Antić, the club had huge expectations from their expensive and highly rated signing. Real were coming off a difficult season during which they made two coaching changes before barely managing a UEFA Cup spot by finishing third in La Liga under Antić, their third head coach that season.

However, pretty much immediately, 22-year-old Prosinečki got sidelined with a string of muscular injuries. Administered by team doctors, he underwent a series of tests as well as a strict dietary regime in addition to getting forced into changing many lifestyle-related habits. Still, the first season turned out to be a complete write-off: he appeared in only three league matches with a notable shining moment — scoring a free-kick goal versus Barcelona in El Clásico on 19 October 1991.

Although injury-riddled as well, Prosinečki's second season at Real did provide a hint of a breakthrough with 29 league appearances and three goals, however, it was still far off the expectations indicated by his reputation and price tag.

His best season at Real, 1993–94, would incidentally turn out to be his last with the club, with six league goals.

==== Loan to Oviedo ====
During the 1994 summer transfer window, after three indifferent seasons in Madrid, Real brass decided that Prosinečki's physical fragility and injuries were too much to deal with, offloading the twenty-five-year-old to Real Oviedo on a loan deal. Reuniting with Radomir Antić—the same head coach who had brought him to Real three years earlier—Prosinečki ended up playing his best season yet in Spain, even winning a league match against his former club Real Madrid in May 1995. He stood out for his good performances as an organizer, he recovered his best level and he felt more satisfied with his physical and psychological state. He also started being a regular in the Croatia national team. In his statements to the press reflected "I'm enjoying my football" and reaffirmed his intention to leave Real Madrid without fulfilling the fifth year of contract he had left.

=== Barcelona ===
The summer 1995 arrival of Radomir Antić to Atlético Madrid motivated Atlético to reach an agreement with Real Madrid, whom Prosinečki was still contracted to. However, Barcelona stepped in by presenting Zoran Vekić, the Croatian's agent, with a better offer. While the interest of the Colchoneros was made public, the other bid was not leaked to the press. At the end, Prosinečki became a free agent, he rejected Atlético and signed on 20 July 1995 to Barcelona with a contract of €3 million for three seasons, plus two optional. Ramón Mendoza did not want his eternal rival to take the midfielder free, but the bad economic situation of Real Madrid precipitated his departure.

In Barcelona, he suffered muscle injuries again that made him miss the first part of the season. By the time he recovered, coach Johan Cruyff did not trust him and relegated him to the substitution bench, so he only played 19 games in the 1995–96 season.

The following season, 1996–97, new manager Bobby Robson reduced Prosinečki to friendly matches. After this, Prosinečki wanted to leave. On 14 December 1996, he was sold to Sevilla for €1.67 million.

=== Sevilla ===
Prosinečki spent the rest of the 1996-97 season in Sevilla and was always a first choice pick for the team.

=== Croatia Zagreb ===
In 1997, he returned home to play for Croatia Zagreb (Dinamo's name at the time) for a fee of €2.5 million. His arrival was very well received by the fans and meant the return of the midfielder to the club where he began his professional career.

During his first season, he won the double with the team and reached the UEFA Cup third round, where Prosinečki's performances where a key factor to victory against MTK Hungária and Grasshopper.

The next two seasons saw Prosinečki lead, as captain, one of the best generations of Dinamo Zagreb, winning the league twice and playing in the UEFA Champions League in consecutive seasons. In their European campaign, Dinamo reached their best result in the competition. Prosinečki is remembered by the fans most notably for his performances against Celtic and Manchester United.

=== Hrvatski Dragovoljac and Standard Liège ===
On 14 July 2000, Prosinečki signed to Hrvatski Dragovoljac as a free agent. The club president Stjepan Spajić said Prosinečki would sign a two-year contract with a clause that he could leave if a foreign club would make an offer to him.

In January 2001, he moved again to Standard Liège where he played until the end of the season, finishing third in the Belgian First Division.

=== Portsmouth ===
In summer of 2001, 32-year-old Prosinečki signed for First Division (second-tier of the English football league system) side Portsmouth on a one-year deal. He was signed by the club's Yugoslav owner, Milan Mandarić. His goals and assists in the 2001–02 season were instrumental in saving the team from relegation, the highlight of which was scoring a hat-trick against Barnsley in a 4–4 home draw on 2 February 2002. It was the only hat-trick of his career, but he refused the customary match ball at the end of the game, as his team had not won. Prosinečki is still held as a folk hero at Portsmouth for his performances in his sole season with the club. At the end of the 2007–08 season, the readers of The News picked Prosinečki as part of an all-time best Portsmouth eleven. He was the only non-British player to be among the selection. After speaking with Prosinečki, fellow Croat Niko Kranjčar made the decision to sign for Portsmouth in the summer of 2006.

=== Later career ===
Prosinečki then had a one-year stint at Olimpija Ljubljana. With Olimpija Ljubljana Prosinečki won his last trophy, the 2002–03 Slovenian Cup; he even scored a goal in the final.

In the summer of 2003, Prosinečki moved back to his home country to play one more professional season for NK Zagreb. He then ended his playing career with low tier club Savski Marof in the spring of 2005.

== International career ==
Prosinečki had 49 caps for Croatia and scored 10 goals for his country. He was also capped 15 times, scoring four goals, for Yugoslavia. In 1987, he was named the tournament's best player as Yugoslavia won the World Youth Championship in Chile along with fellow Croatians Zvonimir Boban, Robert Jarni, Davor Šuker and Igor Štimac.

Prosinečki then played for Yugoslavia at the 1990 World Cup, and for Croatia at Euro 1996 and the 1998 and 2002 World Cups. It was at the 1998 World Cup that Prosinečki and the Croatian squad managed a historic third-place finish, with Prosinečki scoring two goals throughout the tournament, including one in Croatia's 2–1 victory over the Netherlands in the bronze-medal match; as a result, he is the only player in history to have scored World Cup finals goals for two different national teams.

In 1990, Prosinečki scored one goal for Yugoslavia in a group match against the United Arab Emirates and eight years later, he added two goals for Croatia by scoring in a group match against Jamaica and in the third place match against the Netherlands. He played in a total of nine World Cup matches, three for Yugoslavia in 1990 and six for Croatia in 1998 and 2002.

== Style of play ==
Prosinečki, nicknamed Žuti (the Yellow One) throughout his career due to his blond hair, was considered one of the most creative and technically skilled footballers who emerged from Eastern Europe in the 1980s. His favourite position was that of a pure midfielder, although he often also played as a right winger or as an attacking midfielder, and delayed his relocation to the centre of the pitch in order to elaborate and organize the attacking plays of his teammates with his passing, as the number 10 role best utilized his excellent vision of the game. He used to retain possession due to his dribbling skills and would impose his pace on rivals with his passing and ability to exploit spaces. On a technical level, he stood out for his ability to pass short, dribble, and drive forward with the ball. He also had a strong shot that made him dangerous from set pieces.

His style was criticized at times by some Real Madrid fans, although he was often played out of position during his time in the Spanish capital. Vicente del Bosque, his last coach with the team, recovered him for the playmaker role and defined his performances in the following way:

It cannot be denied that he is an individualist. But you also have to think that you need the partners. Many times the audience whistles at him because he keeps the ball, without thinking that maybe he does it because he has no other choice.

— Vicente del Bosque in 1994

Prosinečki has stated that out of the coaches he played for his favourite was Johan Cruyff.

His biggest weaknesses as a footballer were his proneness to muscle injuries (which saw him sidelined for almost the entire 1991–92 season), his poor defensive work-rate, his inconsistency, and his motivation. He also reproached himself for his addiction to tobacco.

== Managerial career ==
=== Early career ===
Prosinečki began his managerial career in 2004 as an assistant to Mile Petković at NK Zagreb.

In 2006, he was named the assistant to head coach Slaven Bilić in the Croatia national football team. He went with them to UEFA Euro 2008.

=== Red Star Belgrade ===
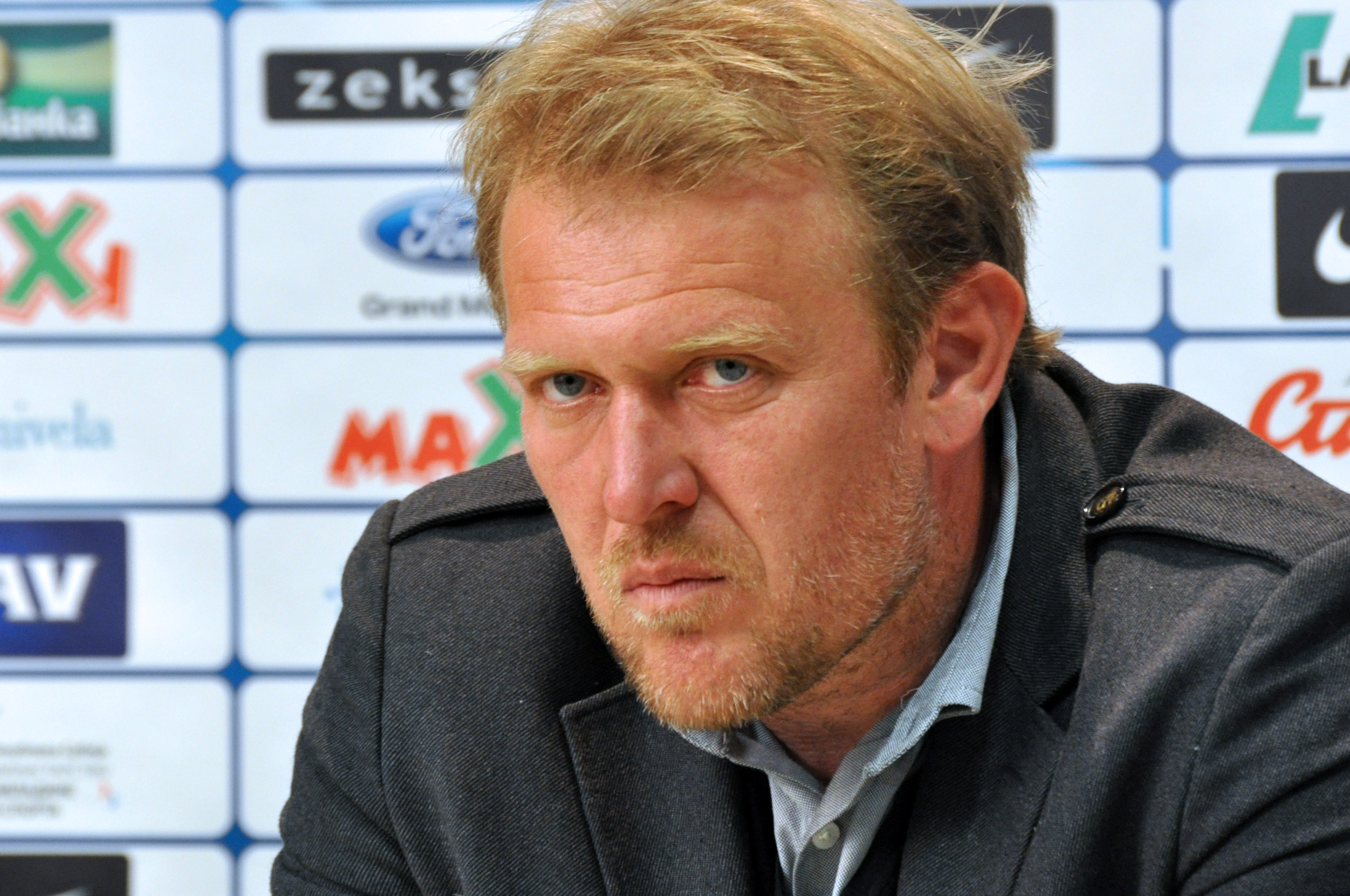
Prosinečki during a press conference with Red Star Belgrade in 2012

In December 2010, during the 2010–11 Serbian SuperLiga mid-season winter break, Prosinečki was announced as the new manager of Red Star Belgrade, replacing recently released Aleksandar Kristić. Returning to the club of his biggest playing successes, the announcement made major headlines all over the Balkans and also generated plenty of buzz in the rest of Europe. The angle of Prosinečki being the first Croatian to coach in Serbia following the Yugoslav Wars also got a lot of attention. His annual salary was not officially disclosed, however, Serbian press speculated with figures from US$100,000 to $250,000 per year.

At the time of Prosinečki taking over, fifteen matches into the league season, the famous yet recently beleaguered Serbian club was in second place, five points behind league leaders Partizan. Red Star brass led by club president Vladan Lukić (Prosinečki's former teammate at Marakana) thus steered clear of stating league title as an explicit requirement for the club legend, still, it was understood that making an outside run at the title remained a priority. Prosinečki announced his intent to mold Red Star into an attacking team that utilizes short-passing game to break down opponents, picking Slobodan Marović and Žarko Đurović (also Red Star colleagues from playing days) to be his assistants. Immediately, however, the issue of Prosinečki's pro coaching licence came up when it was discovered that he may not yet meet criteria for one, which according to Serbian SuperLiga rules would preclude him from being physically present on the sidelines during official matches. The things were straightened out by the time league restarted and Prosinečki's bench debut, which was scheduled to take place versus Smederevo at Marakana on 26 February 2011.

His side finished in second place, six points off bitter rivals Partizan. The following season, 2011–12, his side again finished in second place and again second to Partizan, this time the margin was doubled from six to twelve points. In August 2012, Prosinečki resigned as manager of Red Star, even though he won the 2011–12 Serbian Cup after beating Borac Čačak in the final 2–0, on 16 May 2012.

=== Kayserispor ===
On 15 October 2012, it was announced that Prosinečki would replace Shota Arveladze as manager of struggling Kayserispor in the Turkish Super League. He became the new head coach of Kayserispor at the eighth week of the 2012–13 Süper Lig, and he gained 13 wins in 27 league matches and finished the league at fifth position.

The start of the 2013–14 season was not so successful for Prosinečki and his team. After achieving only one victory in eleven rounds, Kayserispor was at the bottom of the league table. In November 2013, Prosinečki resigned but his resignation was not accepted by the club board. A month and a half later, the club record had not improved. Kayserispor was 17th on the Süper Lig table and lost to Tokatspor in the Turkish Cup. In the last days of 2013, Prosinečki definitively resigned as manager of Kayserispor.

=== Azerbaijan ===
On 3 December 2014, Prosinečki was named the new manager of the Azerbaijan national football team, replacing Berti Vogts with a two-year contract until UEFA Euro 2016. His contract fee was reported around $1.5 million. After three years spent in Azerbaijan, it was announced that he did not extend his contract for two more years with the Azerbaijan Football Association, and left the team shortly after. Prosinečki is considered one of the finest coaches of Azerbaijan national team, along with Berti Vogts. Under his guidance Azerbaijan played well, having drawn against Croatia 0–0, undefeated against Norway, an away draw against Czech Republic, victory over Qatar 2–0, victory over Malta 2–0, and biggest victory in Azerbaijan history – 5–1 against San Marino. Despite this, he opted to leave Azerbaijan, having failed to guide Azerbaijan to qualify for any major competitions.

=== Bosnia and Herzegovina ===
On 4 January 2018, Prosinečki was named the new manager of the Bosnia and Herzegovina national football team.

On 15 November 2018, after a goalless draw against Austria in the 2018–19 UEFA Nations League, Bosnia and Herzegovina topped its group and got promoted to the League A of the 2020–21 UEFA Nations League. With that draw, Prosinečki tied Safet Sušić's record with a 10-game unbeaten run in all official matches as Bosnia and Herzegovina national team manager. He secured play-offs for Euro 2020 by topping the group.

On 18 November, Prosinečki had a chance to make a new, eleven-game unbeaten run record against Spain in a friendly match, but he did not, as Bosnia and Herzegovina lost 1–0 with a 78th-minute goal from Brais Méndez to secure Spain a win. Even though Bosnia and Herzegovina lost, throughout the whole match they were considered an equal opponent by some and some thought it showed what kind of change Prosinečki had made to the players and to their mentality and style of play.

His biggest win as the Bosnia and Herzegovina national team head coach came on 5 September 2019, in a 5–0 home win against Liechtenstein in the UEFA Euro 2020 qualifiers.

On 8 September 2019, three days after the victory over Lichtenstein, Prosinečki resigned from the position of Bosnia and Herzegovina national team head coach after a 2–4 away loss against Armenia, thus losing almost every direct chance of qualifying for the Euros. Two days later, on 10 September, Prosinečki decided to remain as head coach. He stated that after talks with the Bosnia and Herzegovina FA board of directors, they eventually convinced him to withdraw the decision. His campaign during the qualifying had already been depressing, as Bosnia and Herzegovina suffered a shock 0–2 away loss to Finland, a poor 2–2 home draw with Greece and a 1–2 away defeat to Italy before the humiliating 2–4 loss away to Armenia.

Upon his first games following his decision to withdrawal the resignation as coach of the national team, Bosnia and Herzegovina managed to convincingly defeat Finland 4–1 at home soil to keep them on the race for the Euro spot. However, Bosnia and Herzegovina fell 1–2 away to already eliminated Greece, that unofficially eliminated Bosnia and Herzegovina from qualifying directly.

On 27 November 2019, it was announced that Prosinečki and the Bosnia and Herzegovina FA had reached mutual agreement for him to leave his role.

=== Return to Kayserispor ===
On 29 December 2019, Prosinečki came back to Kayserispor, managing the club for a second time in his managerial career and managing a club for the first time in over six years. On 6 August 2020, he left the club after rejecting a two-year contract extension because of the club's transfer policy for the following season, which was conditioned by a transfer limit determined by the Turkish Football Federation.

=== Denizlispor ===
On 10 August 2020, Prosinečki was named the new manager of Denizlispor. He resigned on 24 November after a disappointing start to the season.

=== Olimpija Ljubljana ===
On 22 March 2022, Prosinečki signed a two-year contract with Slovenian PrvaLiga side Olimpija Ljubljana, replacing fellow countryman Dino Skender. He left the club on 1 July 2022, together with sporting director Mladen Rudonja, after a dispute with club owner Adam Delius.

=== Rudeš ===
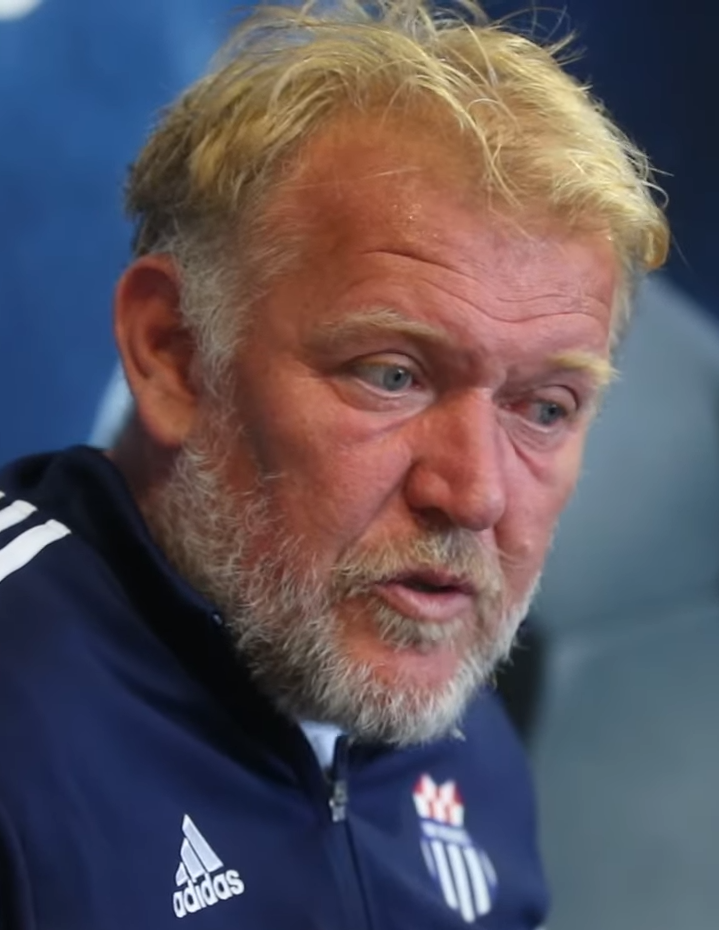
Prosinečki with Rudeš in 2023

After a year without a club, Prosinečki became the manager of newly promoted Croatian top division side Rudeš on 7 June 2023, replacing Davor Mladina.

=== Montenegro ===
Prosinecki took over Montenegro in February 2024. As national team manager he led Montenegro national football team for 17 matches. His last match as national team manager was against Croatia in September 2025.

=== Kyrgyzstan ===
In December 2025 Prosinecki was unveiled as the new Kyrgyzstan national football team manager. He signed a one year contract with an option to extend contingent on Kyrgyzstan’s good performance at the 2027 AFC Asian Cup.

== Minifootball ==
Both during and after his career as a professional footballer, Prosinečki has also participated at the Kutija Šibica Minifootball tournaments in Zagreb. He won first place in 1989 with a team called Termotehna Šela, then in 1998 with team Moby Dick Segafredo and in 2002, 2003, 2004 with team Riva Grupa. In 1997, Moby Dick came in second place. In 2003, Prosinečki was awarded best player of the tournament.

Prosinečki even coached a team named Promotionplay in 2006 where they lost 5–0 in the final.

On 26 December 2017, Prosinečki played at a humanitarian tournament Četiri kafića (Four cafés), receiving a standing ovation from the fans in Arena Gripe during his performances while playing.

== Entrepreneurship ==
In March 2007, several years following the end of his football playing career, Prosinečki decided to invest some of his earnings into launching a restaurant in Zagreb. Named Prosikito, after the nickname Spanish press gave him during his time in La Liga, the restaurant is located in the Zagreb neighbourhood of Stara Peščenica and is run day-to-day by his younger brother Sven Daniel.

In late February 2016, in partnership with another retired footballer, Janko Janković, Prosinečki opened an 8-court indoor padel commercial facility called Padel.hr at the Zagreb Fair. Prosinečki and Janković became aware of padel — a simplified version of tennis with elements of squash — during their respective professional footballing stints in Spain and decided to try to monetize it back home where it is largely unknown. After struggling to attract patrons initially, the facility has reportedly recorded significant growth since with 7,000 registered players.

== Controversy ==
=== Relationship with Ćiro Blažević ===
During the late 1980s and early 1990s, parallel with Prosinečki's rise to football superstardom at Red Star Belgrade, Real Madrid, Barcelona as well as Yugoslav and Croatia national teams, the story of him being chased away from Dinamo Zagreb in 1987 by the famous coach Ćiro Blažević grew in Croatian and Yugoslav media and public. To this day it is often cited and referenced as an example of football mismanagement, poor player selection, and bad work with youth categories. Colourful Blažević, the villain of the piece, rarely talked on the record about the circumstances of Prosinečki's departure. However, in 2010, Blažević deflected responsibility for the flap by claiming he actually gave the youngster a four-year contract that was eventually, according to Blažević, annulled by Dinamo president Ante Pavlović on a technicality due to not being processed administratively by the subfederation responsible. On the same occasion, Blažević went on to accuse Prosinečki's father Đuro of not negotiating in good faith with Dinamo by saying "he already had his combination with Red Star". Asked about his famous quote about eating his diploma if Prosinečki ever became a player, Blažević responded that he only used it as a motivation tool.

Blažević and Prosinečki would reignite their simmering feud eleven years later during the 1998 World Cup where they were part of the Croatia national team that made it all the way to the semi-finals. In the semi-final match that Croatia lost 1–2 versus eventual winners France after going ahead 1–0, Blažević decided to leave 29-year-old Prosinečki on the bench (he eventually entered the contest in the 90th minute, coming on for Mario Stanić), which led to a lot of criticism.

=== Court case versus Dinamo ===
In the summer of 1997, twenty-eight-year-old Prosinečki came back to Zagreb in order to play for the club where he had started his professional career eleven years earlier, Dinamo Zagreb. Now called NK Croatia Zagreb, the club was turned into a state project bankrolled by the Croatian government's highest echelons and personally supported by the country's president Franjo Tuđman. By 2000, Prosinečki left Croatia Zagreb, but in late 2001, decided to initiate a lawsuit against the club (whose name had been restored back to Dinamo in the meantime due to continuous fan protests) over DM1,550,000 (€750,000) in unpaid wages.

Years later in 2009, the court ruled against Prosinečki, asserting that the lawsuit against Dinamo had no merit since Prosinečki played for Croatia Zagreb, and not Dinamo Zagreb. Commenting on the verdict in late 2009, Prosinečki said he was cheated out of his money.

== Career statistics ==
=== Club ===
Appearances and goals by club, season and competition
Season	Club	League			National cup		League cup		Continental		Total	
Season	Club	Division	Apps	Goals	Apps	Goals	Apps	Goals	Apps	Goals	Apps	Goals
Yugoslavia		League			Cup		League Cup		Continental		Total	
1986–87	Dinamo Zagreb	Yugoslav First League	2	1	0	0	—		—		2	1
1987–88	Red Star Belgrade	Yugoslav First League	23	4	3	2	—		4	0	30	6
1988–89	Red Star Belgrade	Yugoslav First League	33	4	2	0	—		2	0	37	4
1989–90	Red Star Belgrade	Yugoslav First League	32	5	8	3	—		6	1	46	9
1990–91	Red Star Belgrade	Yugoslav First League	29	12	6	2	—		9	4	44	18
Spain		League			Copa del Rey		Supercopa		Europe		Total	
1991–92	Real Madrid	La Liga	3	1	0	0	—		2	1	5	2
1992–93	Real Madrid	La Liga	29	3	2	1	—		5	0	36	4
1993–94	Real Madrid	La Liga	23	6	4	0	2	0	5	0	32	6
1994–95	Real Oviedo	La Liga	30	5	2	0	0	0	—	—	32	5
1995–96	Barcelona	La Liga	19	2	4	0	—		0	0	23	2
1996–97	Barcelona	La Liga	—		—		0	0	3	0	3	0
1996–97	Sevilla	La Liga	20	4	2	0	—		—		22	4
Croatia		League			Croatian Cup		League Cup		Europe		Total	
1997–98	Croatia Zagreb	Prva HNL	16	5	3	1	—		10	5	29	11
1998–99	Croatia Zagreb	Prva HNL	15	4	0	0	—		3	2	18	6
1999–2000	Croatia Zagreb	Prva HNL	19	5	3	5	—		6	1	28	11
2000–01	Hrvatski Dragovoljac	Prva HNL	4	1	0	0	—		—		4	1
Belgium		League			Belgian Cup		League Cup		Europe		Total	
2000–01	Standard Liège	Belgian First Division	21	4	2	1	—		—		23	5
England		League			FA Cup		League Cup		Europe		Total	
2001–02	Portsmouth	English First Division	33	9	1	0	1	0	—		35	9
Slovenia		League			Slovenian Cup		League Cup		Europe		Total	
2002–03	Olimpija Ljubljana	Slovenian PrvaLiga	23	3	4	1	—		—		27	4
Croatia		League			Croatian Cup		League Cup		Europe		Total	
2003–04	NK Zagreb	Prva HNL	26	5	1	0	—		0	0	27	5
Career total			400	83	47	16	3	0	55	14	505	113

=== International ===
Appearances and goals by national team and year
Team	Year	Apps	Goals
National team	Year	Apps	Goals
Yugoslavia	1989	5	1
Yugoslavia	1990	7	2
Yugoslavia	1991	3	1
Total		15	4
Croatia	1994	5	1
Croatia	1995	5	2
Croatia	1996	9	0
Croatia	1997	7	1
Croatia	1998	8	4
Croatia	1999	0	0
Croatia	2000	2	0
Croatia	2001	8	2
Croatia	2002	5	0
Total		49	10

Scores and results list Yugoslavia's and Croatia's goal tally first, score column indicates score after each Prosinečki goal.

List of international goals scored by Robert Prosinečki
No.	Date	Venue	Opponent	Score	Result	Competition
Yugoslavia goals
1	20 September 1989	Vojvodina Stadium, Novi Sad, Yugoslavia	Greece	2–0	3–0	Friendly
2	19 June 1990	Stadio Renato Dall'Ara, Bologna, Italy	United Arab Emirates	4–1	4–1	1990 FIFA World Cup
3	12 September 1990	Windsor Park, Belfast, Northern Ireland	Northern Ireland	2–0	2–0	UEFA Euro 1992 qualifying
4	16 May 1991	Red Star Stadium, Belgrade, Yugoslavia	Faroe Islands	2–0	7–0	UEFA Euro 1992 qualifying
Croatia goals
1	23 March 1994	Estadio Luís Casanova, Valencia, Spain	Spain	1–0	2–0	Friendly
2	25 March 1995	Stadion Maksimir, Zagreb, Croatia	Ukraine	3–0	4–0	UEFA Euro 1996 qualifying
3	26 April 1995	Stadion Maksimir, Zagreb, Croatia	Slovenia	1–0	2–0	UEFA Euro 1996 qualifying
4	2 April 1997	Stadion Poljud, Split, Croatia	Slovenia	1–0	3–3	1998 FIFA World Cup qualification
5	3 June 1998	Stadion Kantrida, Rijeka, Croatia	Iran	1–0	2–0	Friendly
6	6 June 1998	Stadion Maksimir, Zagreb, Croatia	Australia	3–0	7–0	Friendly
7	14 June 1998	Stade Félix Bollaert, Lens, France	Jamaica	2–1	3–1	1998 FIFA World Cup
8	11 July 1998	Parc des Princes, Paris, France	Netherlands	1–0	2–1	1998 FIFA World Cup
9	5 September 2001	Stadio Olimpico, Serravalle, San Marino	San Marino	2–0	4–0	2002 FIFA World Cup qualification
10	5 September 2001	Stadio Olimpico, Serravalle, San Marino	San Marino	4–0	4–0	2002 FIFA World Cup qualification

== Managerial statistics ==
As of match played 9 June 2026

Team	From	To	Record				
Team	From	To	G	W	D	L	Win %
Red Star Belgrade	9 December 2010	20 August 2012	62	43	10	9	69.35
Kayserispor	15 October 2012	10 January 2014	48	18	12	18	37.50
Azerbaijan	3 December 2014	5 November 2017	23	6	6	11	26.09
Bosnia and Herzegovina	4 January 2018	27 November 2019	22	9	6	7	40.91
Kayserispor	13 January 2020	6 August 2020	19	6	5	8	31.58
Denizlispor	10 August 2020	24 November 2020	9	1	2	6	11.11
Olimpija Ljubljana	22 March 2022	1 July 2022	8	5	1	2	62.50
Rudeš	7 June 2023	3 September 2023	7	0	1	6	0.00
Montenegro	2 February 2024	19 September 2025	17	6	1	10	35.29
Kyrgyzstan	10 December 2025	present	4	0	2	2	0.00
Total			219	94	46	79	42.92

== Honours ==
=== Player ===
Red Star Belgrade

- Yugoslav First League: 1987–88, 1989–90, 1990–91
- Yugoslav Cup: 1989–90
- European Cup: 1990–91

Real Madrid

- Copa del Rey: 1992–93
- Supercopa de España: 1993
- Copa Iberoamericana: 1994

Dinamo Zagreb

- Croatian First League: 1997–98, 1998–99, 1999–2000
- Croatian Cup: 1997–98

Olimpija Ljubljana

- Slovenian Cup: 2002–03

Yugoslavia

- FIFA U-20 World Cup: 1987
- UEFA European Under-21 Championship runner-up: 1990

Croatia

- FIFA World Cup third place: 1998

Individual

- FIFA U-20 World Cup Golden Ball: 1987
- FIFA World Cup Best Young Player: 1990
- Yugoslav Footballer of the Year: 1990
- Večernji list football player of the year: 1990, 1997
- ADN Eastern European Footballer of the Season: 1990
- Bravo Award: 1991
- 1991 FIFA World Player of the Year: 4th place
- 1991 Ballon d'Or: 5th place
- Croatian Footballer of the Year: 1997
- Franjo Bučar State Award for Sport (2): 1997, 1998
- PFA First Division Team of the Year: 2001–02
- Portsmouth F.C. All-time XI
- Only non-British player to be voted into all-time best Portsmouth eleven
- 6th Zvezdina zvezda

=== Manager ===
Red Star Belgrade

- Serbian Cup: 2011–12

=== Orders ===
- Order of Danica Hrvatska with the face of Franjo Bučar: 1995
- Order of the Croatian Trefoil: 1998

== Personal life ==
In June 1999, Prosinečki married his girlfriend Vlatka. The couple have two daughters.

Prosinečki was an avid cigarette smoker throughout his career playing professional football, which many of his former teammates talked about in form of anecdotes.

In 2019, Bosnia-Herzegovina national team head coach Prosinečki's name was in the news in Croatia due to his wife Vlatka's purchase of a Range Rover Sport SDV6 HSE vehicle from a local Croatia-based vendor that was found to be part of a Croatian-Slovenian organized crime luxury vehicle import ring, offering vehicles at lower prices by evading value-added tax payments through fraudulent invoices. In addition to Prosinečki's wife, his brother Sven Daniel was also interviewed by the Croatian police during their investigation.
