= Robert Jarni =

Croatian footballer and manager

Personal information
- Date of birth: 26 October 1968 (age 58)
- Place of birth: Čakovec, Republic of Croatia
- Height: 1.80 m (5 ft 11 in)
- Position: Wing-back

Youth career
- MTČ Čakovec
- Hajduk Split

Senior career*
Years	Team	Apps	(Gls)
1986–1991	Hajduk Split	128	(17)
1991–1993	Bari	52	(3)
1993–1994	Torino	23	(0)
1994–1995	Juventus	15	(1)
1995–1998	Real Betis	98	(19)
1998	Coventry City	0	(0)
1998–1999	Real Madrid	27	(1)
1999–2001	Las Palmas	43	(6)
2001–2002	Panathinaikos	5	(0)
Total		391	(47)

International career
1987	Yugoslavia U20	6	(0)
1990–1991	Yugoslavia	7	(1)
1990–2002	Croatia	81	(1)
2003	Croatia (futsal)	2	(2)

Managerial career
- 2007–2008: Hajduk Split
- 2010–2011: Istra 1961
- 2012–2013: Hajduk Split U19
- 2013–2014: Sarajevo
- 2014–2015: Pécs
- 2015–2016: Puskás Akadémia
- 2017–2019: Croatia U19
- 2019–2020: NorthEast United
- 2022–2024: Croatia U17
Medal record
Men's football
Representing Yugoslavia
FIFA World Youth Championship
Winner	1987 Chile
UEFA European Under-21 Championship
Runner-up	1990
Representing Croatia
FIFA World Cup
Third place	1998 France
- * Club domestic league appearances and goals

Robert Jarni (born 26 October 1968) is a Croatian former professional footballer who played as a left winger or wing-back.

Jarni started his professional career with Hajduk Split in 1986, and went on to spend 10 years playing for various clubs in Italy and Spain before finishing his career as a player in Greece with Panathinaikos in 2002.

He was a regular in the Croatia national team between 1990 and 2002, winning a total of 80 international caps for Croatia and being the national team's record cap holder until June 2006, when his record was beaten by Dario Šimić. Prior to Croatia's independence, he also won seven international caps for the Yugoslavia.

Jarni participated in three FIFA World Cups, in 1990 with Yugoslavia and in 1998 and 2002 with Croatia, making a total of eleven appearances in the competition. The crowning moment of his career was the 1998 World Cup in France, where he appeared in all of Croatia's seven matches at the tournament and helped them win the bronze medal in their first World Cup appearance. He also scored his only international goal for Croatia during the tournament, netting the opening goal in their 3–0 win over Germany in the quarter-finals. During the last qualifying match of Euro 2000 where Croatia played Yugoslavia, Jarni collided with defender Zoran Mirković and insulted Mirković after he went down, only for Mirković to grab and twist Jarni's testicles, in which the referee sent him off and banned him for three matches, which made him miss Yugoslavia's Euro 2000 campaign.

After his retirement from professional football as a player, he spent several seasons playing futsal, even winning two international caps for Croatia in the sport, and also started his managerial career with Hajduk Split in 2007.

== Club career ==
Born in Čakovec, Jarni started his career in his hometown with MTČ Čakovec. In June 1985, he was spotted by Hajduk Split while playing for MTČ in a cup match in Split and started his professional career by joining the club in February 1986. He stayed with Hajduk until 1991, when he moved abroad for the first time in his career, signing with Italian side Bari.

After spending two seasons with Bari, he moved to Torino in 1993, and spent one season with the club before moving to local rivals Juventus in 1994. He also spent just one season with Juventus, and went on to move to Spanish side Real Betis in 1995. He had a fairly successful spell with the Seville club, appearing in 98 Primera División matches for the club over the following three seasons, also scoring a total of 19 goals in the league.

In the summer of 1998, Jarni initially moved to English side Coventry City, signing for £2.6 million from Real Betis. However, when Real Madrid decided they wanted the player, they successfully bought him from Coventry for £3.4 million, with Jarni having made no appearances whatsoever. Some believe this was a joint Coventry City and Real Madrid tactic, as Betis refused to sell him to the Madrid club.

At Real Madrid, Jarni struggled to get his place in the starting line-up and often found himself receiving little playing time as a substitute, although he did manage to finish the season with a total of 27 Primera División appearances on his tally. His only league goal for Real Madrid came in their 5–1 win at Extremadura on 31 October 1998, when he netted the opening goal of the match in the first minute. One of the highlights of his spell with Real Madrid came ten days earlier in their third UEFA Champions League group match that season, when he netted a brace in their 6–1 win at home to Sturm Graz.

In the summer of 1999, Jarni left Real Madrid for Segunda División side Las Palmas, going on to help the club gain promotion to the Primera División for the 2000–01 season, which saw him making another 26 appearances in the Spanish top flight, scoring two goals. After losing his place as a regular at Las Palmas and making no appearances for the club in the first half of the 2001–02 season, Jarni went on to move to Greek side Panathinaikos on 30 January 2002, signing a short-term contract until the end of the season.

Jarni only appeared in five matches for Panathinaikos in the Greek league, although he also made three appearances for the club in the UEFA Champions League in February and March 2002. Despite his remarkable performances, he was ruled out due to a serious head injury due to excessive zeal in a match against Porto. His contract was not renewed at the end of the season, and he subsequently retired from professional football as a player, aged 33.

== International career ==
As a youngster, Jarni played for the Yugoslav national under-21 football team. He was part of the Yugoslav squad that won the 1987 FIFA World Youth Championship in Chile, alongside his future Croatia team-mates Davor Šuker, Zvonimir Boban, Robert Prosinečki and Igor Štimac.

In 1990, Jarni became a full international with Yugoslavia. He won seven international caps with the team in 1990 and 1991, scoring one goal. He was also part of the Yugoslav squad for the 1990 FIFA World Cup finals in Italy, where he made his World Cup debut as a half-time substitute for Srečko Katanec in the team's second group match, a 1–0 win against Colombia.

Jarni's international debut for Croatia came on 22 December 1990 in a friendly match against Romania. He quickly established himself as a regular with the team and was also part of the Croatian squad for the country's first appearance in the finals of a major tournament, at the UEFA Euro 1996 in England. He appeared in all of Croatia's four matches at the tournament before they were knocked out in the quarter-finals after losing 2–1 to Germany, who went on to win the tournament.

Two years later, Jarni was named in the Croatian squad for the country's first World Cup appearance, at the 1998 finals in France, and was an important member of the team that went on to win the bronze medals at the tournament. He appeared in all of Croatia's seven matches during the tournament, with his highlight being the opening goal in Croatia's 3–0 win over Germany in the quarter-finals. It was his only international goal for Croatia, although he set up a number of other goals for the national team with numerous assists resulting from his fast runs through the left flank and precise crosses or passes into the box. One of those assists came later during 1998 World Cup, when he set up Robert Prosinečki's opening goal in Croatia's 2–1 win against the Netherlands in the third-place match.

Jarni continued to play regularly for Croatia until 2002, when he retired from football as a player. His final international was a June 2002 World Cup finals match against Ecuador. He also appeared in all of their three group matches at the 2002 FIFA World Cup finals in Japan, where Croatia were eliminated following the group stage. The three appearances made Jarni the only player to feature in all of Croatia's 10 matches in their first two World Cup appearances. Having been a Croatian international for 11 1/2 years, Jarni won a total of 81 international caps for the team and was their record cap holder before Dario Šimić beat his record on 18 June 2006 in Croatia's 0–0 draw against Japan during the 2006 FIFA World Cup finals.

== Managerial career ==
Jarni started his managerial career in professional football as assistant manager to Sergije Krešić at Hajduk Split in late August 2007. After Krešić's resignation on 26 October 2007, Jarni was appointed head coach at the club and was initially presented as caretaker manager until the end of the first part of the Croatian league season in December. His first match as head coach at Hajduk Split was a 1–0 away victory at Inter Zaprešić on 27 October 2007. He went on to sign a one-year contract with the club after the match. The season proved to be a disappointment for Hajduk as they only managed to finish fifth in the league, 30 points behind the champions and arch-rivals Dinamo Zagreb. Jarni was eventually replaced by Goran Vučević on 20 May 2008, ten days after the club's final league game of the season.

On 4 August 2010, Jarni was appointed new manager at Istra 1961, where he replaced Ante Miše, who had been sacked after the club lost their first two matches of the 2010–11 season in the Croatian first division. On 7 August 2010, he had his first match in charge of the club, suffering a 1–0 defeat in an away fixture at Lokomotiva Zagreb in the Croatian top flight. He resigned from the managerial post on 19 September 2010, after recording two draws and four defeats in six league matches in charge of the club.

In 2012, he took charge of Hajduk's U-19 team. In July 2013 his contract with Hajduk was mutually terminated.

=== Sarajevo ===
Sarajevo on 1 December 2013, after suffering a total of seven defeats in the league and getting knocked out of the UEFA Europa League second qualification round, sacked Husref Musemić and appointed Jarni as the head coach; Jarni lost just one game after taking over as the head coach and finished in fourth position in the table. On 9 April, toward the end of the 2013–2014 season, he was asked to leave, following internal tension of the club's inability to win the league. Sarajevo finished third in the league this season, trailing one point behind Široki Brijeg, and were also winners of the Bosnia Football Cup.

=== Pécs ===
On 24 November 2014, Jarni was announced as the new manager of Hungarian side Pécs. When Jarni took over the club, it was in second last position in the league table, and he successfully finished the season in eleventh place. Despite finishing eleventh in the 2014–15 season, the club lost its professional licence due to financial difficulties and gained admittance to the fourth tier of the Hungarian league system in time for the start of the following season. The relegation saw owner Dezső Matyi leaving the club after eight years, when he sold his share to the city of Pécs and this forced Jarni also to quit the club, ending his stint with Pécs.

=== Puskás Akadémia ===
On 16 April 2016, on the 30th matchday and three matches before the end of 2015–16 season, Puskás Akadémia lost to relegation rivals Békéscsaba at the Pancho Arena, falling to last position and a relegation spot for the first time in the season. As a result, Jarni was dismissed as head coach.

=== Croatia U19 ===
From June 2017 to 2019, Jarni was the head coach of the Croatia U19 national football team.

=== NorthEast United ===
From August 2019, Jarni was appointed as the head coach of Indian club NorthEast United, a club based in Guwahati, Assam. It competes in the Indian Super League. His former World Cup teammate Igor Stimac is the head coach of India national football team.

On 10 February 2020, he was dismissed as head coach, in what was called a mutual agreement, after a poor streak of eleven winless matches left the team ninth out of ten teams in the table.

== Futsal career ==
Following his retirement from professional football, Jarni went on to play futsal for Croatian club MNK Split. He had his first spell with the club between 2002 and 2007, before leaving due to his managerial duties with Hajduk Split during the 2007–08 season. After being replaced as Hajduk's manager, he returned to MNK Split and continued his career as a futsal player in the summer of 2008.

He also won two international caps and scored two goals for the Croatia national futsal team in November 2003 during their qualifying campaign for the FIFA Futsal World Cup. As of 2016, he is the only Croatian footballer with international caps in both football and futsal.

== Other activities ==
In association with Astrea, a sportswear brand based near Čakovec, Jarni's hometown, he started his own line of sportswear under the brand name Jarni. The line includes various pieces of sportswear such as football kits, polo shirts and tracksuits, and became quite popular among football and handball clubs in the north Croatian region of Međimurje. For some seasons, Jarni was also the kit supplier of NK Međimurje, a Čakovec-based football club that spent several seasons competing in the Croatian First League.

Jarni also made several appearances as a pundit on Croatian commercial TV station RTL Televizija during their live broadcasts of various international football matches, mostly the away matches of the Croatia national team that were regularly broadcast by the station between 2004 and 2007. Since 2008, however, all of the national team's matches are again broadcast by Croatia's public broadcaster HRT.

== Career statistics ==
=== Club ===
Appearances and goals by club, season and competition
Season	Club	League			National cup (Note: Includes Coppa Italia, Copa del Rey, Greek Cup.)		League cup		Continental		Other		Total	
Season	Club	Division	Apps	Goals	Apps	Goals	Apps	Goals	Apps	Goals	Apps	Goals	Apps	Goals
Hajduk Split	1986–87	Yugoslav First League	21	0	5	0	–		5	0	–		31	0
Hajduk Split	1987–88	Yugoslav First League	15	0	2	0	–		1	0	–		18	0
Hajduk Split	1988–89	Yugoslav First League	31	6	0	0	–		–		–		31	6
Hajduk Split	1989–90	Yugoslav First League	31	2	7	0	–		–		–		38	2
Hajduk Split	1990–91	Yugoslav First League	29	8	8	4	–		–		–		37	12
Hajduk Split	1991–92	Yugoslav First League	–		–		–		2	0	–		2	0
Hajduk Split	Total		127	16	22	4	0	0	8	0	0	0	159	20
Bari	1991–92	Serie A	24	0	1	0	–		–		–		25	0
Bari	1992–93	Serie A	28	3	5	1	–		–		–		33	4
Bari	Total		52	3	6	1	0	0	0	0	0	0	58	4
Torino	1993–94	Serie A	23	0	4	0	–		3	1	1 (Note: Appearance in Supercoppa Italiana)	0	30	1
Juventus	1994–95	Serie A	15	1	6	0	–		9	0	–		30	1
Real Betis	1995–96	La Liga	34	8	1	0	–		5	1	–		40	9
Real Betis	1996–97	La Liga	36	5	6	0	–		–		–		42	5
Real Betis	1997–98	La Liga	28	6	3	0	–		6	0	–		37	6
Real Betis	Total		98	19	10	0	0	0	11	1	0	0	119	20
Real Madrid	1998–99	La Liga	27	1	2	0	–		5	2	1 (Note: Appearance in Intercontinental Cup)	0	35	3
Las Palmas	1999–2000	Segunda División	17	4	–		–		–		–		17	4
Las Palmas	2000–01	La Liga	26	2	1	0	–		–		–		27	2
Las Palmas	Total		43	6	1	0	0	0	0	0	0	0	44	6
Panathinaikos	2001–02	Alpha Ethniki	5	0	–		–		3	0	–		8	0
Career total			390	46	51	5	0	0	39	4	2	0	482	54

=== International ===
Appearances and goals by national team and year
National team	Year	Apps	Goals
Yugoslavia	1990	4	1
Yugoslavia	1991	3	0
Total		7	1
Croatia	1992	1	0
Croatia	1993	1	0
Croatia	1994	7	0
Croatia	1995	6	0
Croatia	1996	12	0
Croatia	1997	6	0
Croatia	1998	14	1
Croatia	1999	9	0
Croatia	2000	6	0
Croatia	2001	11	0
Croatia	2002	7	0
Total		80	1

== Honours ==
=== Player ===
Hajduk Split

- Yugoslav Cup:1986–87, 1990–91

Juventus

- Serie A: 1994–95
- Copa Italia: 1994–95

Real Madrid

- Intercontinental Cup: 1998

Las Palmas

- Segunda Division: 1999–00

Yugoslavia Youth

- FIFA World Youth Championship: 1987
- UEFA European Under-21 Championship runner-up: 1990

Croatia

- FIFA World Cup third place: 1998

== Orders ==
- Order of Danica Hrvatska with face of Franjo Bučar: 1995
- Order of the Croatian Trefoil: 1998
