= David Adekola =

Nigerian footballer (born 1968)

Personal information
- Full name: David Adeolu Adekola
- Date of birth: 19 May 1968 (age 58)
- Place of birth: Lagos, Nigeria
- Height: 6 ft 0 in (1.83 m)
- Position: Forward

Senior career*
Years	Team	Apps	(Gls)
1987–1990	Julius Berger		
1993–1994	Bury	35	(12)
1994	→ Exeter City (loan)	3	(1)
1994	AFC Bournemouth	1	(0)
1994–1995	Wigan Athletic	4	(0)
1995	Halifax Town	2	(0)
1995	Hereford United	0	(0)
1995	Bath City	7	(2)
1995	Cambridge United	5	(1)
1995	→ Bishop's Stortford (loan)		
1995–1996	BFC Preussen		
1996	Viktoria Köln		
1996	Brighton & Hove Albion	1	(0)
1998–1999	Billericay Town		
1999–2000	Slough Town	24	(5)
2000	Walton & Hersham		
2000–2001	Hendon	30	(7)

International career
1987	Nigeria U20	3	(1)
1989–1991	Nigeria	2	(1)
- * Club domestic league appearances and goals

David Adeolu Adekola (born 18 May 1968) is a Nigerian former professional footballer who played for various English clubs in the 1990s and 2000s.

== Club career ==
Adekola was born in Lagos. He joined Bury in January 1993, amid claims that he had played top-flight football in France and Belgium, although it later transpired that his entire international background was untrue. He joined Exeter City on loan in February 1994 and left Bury to join AFC Bournemouth on a free transfer in September 1994. A month later he joined Wigan Athletic, but played only four times before being released in February 1995. He joined Halifax Town, playing twice in the Conference. He had a brief spell with Hereford United before joining Bath City in March 1995, where he scored 3 goals from 9 games in all competitions.

He joined Cambridge United in July 1995, but once more struggled to establish himself and was loaned to Bishop's Stortford. Released by Cambridge in December 1995, Adekola moved to Germany to play for BFC Preussen and Viktoria Köln.

He returned to English football in October 1996 when he signed for Brighton & Hove Albion. He played just once for Brighton, in a 2–1 home defeat to Cambridge United on 12 October, before being released the following month.

In July 1998 he joined Billericay Town, moving to Slough Town in August 1999. He joined Hendon during the 2000–01 season.

In May 2005, Adekola finished runner-up (to Craig Madden) in a vote for Bury's Cult Hero organised by the BBC show Football Focus.

== International career ==
Adekola played for Nigeria's youth side at the 1987 FIFA World Youth Championship in Chile. He also played for the senior Nigeria national football team, scoring on goal on his debut in a 1990 African Cup of Nations qualifier against Guinea in 1989.
