= Miguel Guerrero =

Colombian footballer (born 1967)

Personal information
- Full name: Miguel Ángel Guerrero Paz
- Date of birth: 7 September 1967 (age 59)
- Place of birth: Cali, Colombia
- Height: 1.75 m (5 ft 9 in)
- Position: Forward

Senior career*
Years	Team	Apps	(Gls)
1985–87	Atlético Bucaramanga		
1988–90	América de Cali	48	(20)
1990–91	Málaga	8	(3)
1991–92	América de Cali	20	(1)
1992–94	Atlético Junior	64	(39)
1994–95	AS Bari	34	(2)
1995–96	CP Mérida	21	(0)
1996–99	AS Bari	61	(13)
2000	Junior	8	(0)

International career
1990–1995	Colombia	5	(1)
- * Club domestic league appearances and goals

Miguel Ángel Guerrero Paz (born 7 September 1967) is a Colombian football forward who played for Colombia in the 1990 FIFA World Cup. He also played for América de Cali.
