= Ranko Zirojević =

Montenegrin footballer

Personal information
- Full name: Ranko Zirojević
- Date of birth: 1 September 1967 (age 59)
- Place of birth: Nikšić, SR Montenegro, SFR Yugoslavia
- Height: 1.85 m (6 ft 1 in)
- Position: Midfielder

Youth career
- Sutjeska Nikšić

Senior career*
Years	Team	Apps	(Gls)
1985–1992	Sutjeska Nikšić	140	(20)
1992–1993	Mogren	32	(6)
1993–1994	Ethnikos Piraeus	8+	(2+)
1995	Sutjeska Nikšić	16	(5)
1995–1996	Maribor	27	(1)
1998	Vrbas	28	(9)
Total		251+	(43+)

International career
1987	Yugoslavia U20	4	(1)
Medal record
Gold medal – first place	FIFA World Youth Championship	1987
- * Club domestic league appearances and goals

Ranko Zirojević (Serbian Cyrillic: Ранко Зиројевић; born 1 September 1967) is a Montenegrin former professional footballer who played as a midfielder.

== Club career ==
Zirojević made his senior debut with Sutjeska Nikšić in the 1985–86 Yugoslav First League. He spent seven seasons with the club, including three in the Yugoslav Second League, amassing a total of 140 league appearances and scoring 20 goals. In 1992, Zirojević joined newly promoted First League of FR Yugoslavia side Mogren.

In 1993, Zirojević moved abroad to Greece to play for Beta Ethniki club Ethnikos Piraeus. He helped them win promotion to the top flight in his debut season. In the first half of the 1994–95 Alpha Ethniki, Zirojević appeared in eight games and scored two goals, before returning to Sutjeska Nikšić.

In 1995, Zirojević moved to Slovenian side Maribor, scoring once in 27 appearances during the 1995–96 Slovenian PrvaLiga. He later played for Vrbas in the second half of the 1997–98 season, helping them win promotion to the Second League of FR Yugoslavia, as well as in the first half of the 1998–99 season.

== International career ==
Zirojević represented Yugoslavia at the 1987 FIFA World Youth Championship. He made four appearances in the tournament and scored one goal, helping the nation win the gold medal.
