= Adrian Spyrka =

German footballer

Personal information
- Date of birth: 1 August 1967 (age 59)
- Place of birth: Zabrze, Poland
- Height: 1.86 m (6 ft 1 in)
- Position: Midfielder

Team information
- Current team: Borussia M'Gladbach II (Assistant Manager)

Youth career
- –1986: SV Vestia Disteln

Senior career*
Years	Team	Apps	(Gls)
1986–1988	Borussia Dortmund	12	(0)
1988–1991	1. FC Saarbrücken	80	(6)
1991–1992	Stuttgarter Kickers	19	(0)
1992–1993	1. FC Köln	5	(0)
1993–1995	Rot-Weiss Essen	62	(7)
1995–1996	SG Wattenscheid 09	15	(1)
1996–2002	Mainz 05	108	(4)
Total		301	(18)

International career
1988–1989	West Germany U-21	6	(0)

Managerial career
- 2009–2010: SV Wehen Wiesbaden II
- * Club domestic league appearances and goals

Adrian Spyrka (born 1 August 1967) is a German former professional footballer who played as a midfielder.
