= Scott Nisbet =

Scottish footballer

Personal information
- Full name: Scott Nisbet
- Date of birth: 30 January 1968 (age 58)
- Place of birth: Edinburgh, Scotland
- Position: Midfielder

Youth career
- 1982–1985: Rangers

Senior career*
Years	Team	Apps	(Gls)
1985–1993	Rangers	90	(6)
1986–1987	→ East Fife (loan)	6	(0)
2007–2008	Arniston Rangers		

International career
1988–1989	Scotland U21	5	(0)
- * Club domestic league appearances and goals

Scott Nisbet (born 30 January 1968) is a Scottish former football player, who is best known for his time with Rangers.

== Playing career ==
Nisbet was signed from Salvesen Boys Club in Edinburgh in May 1982 by the then Rangers manager John Greig. He made his Rangers debut on 7 December 1985, as a forward, a 1–0 win against Motherwell. Nisbet only converted to centre-back after featuring in that position during a reserve game against Dundee and his display impressed then manager Graeme Souness.

He scored what was described as a lucky goal in a 1992-93 UEFA Champions League match against Club Brugge on 17 March 1993, when his deflected effort towards goal went over the Brugge goalkeeper Dany Verlinden before going into the net. He had to retire from football in 1993 through injury after initially suffering a groin strain that later developed into a serious pelvic injury.

He made a short comeback aged 38 and played for junior outfit Arniston Rangers. Nisbet also made a surprise appearance as a trialist for Clyde in a friendly against Manchester United on Sunday 18 October 2009. Clyde manager John Brown was unable to sign Nisbet, as Arniston still held his playing registration.

Nisbet represented Scotland at under-21 level, making five appearances for the side.

== In popular culture ==
Nisbet is referenced in the novel Trainspotting by Irvine Welsh in the story Speedy Recruitment. Spud uses him as an example of somebody from Craigroyston who has gone on to be successful in the wider world:

"It's jist when cats see 'Craigroyston' oan the form, they likesay think, well everybody thit went tae Craigie's a waster right? But eh, ye ken Scot Nisbet, the fitba player likesay? He's in the... eh Rangers first team, haudin his ain against the aw they expensive international signins ay Souness's ken? That cat wis the year below us at Craigie, man."
