= Yugoslavia national under-20 football team =

Former national under-20 association football team representing Yugoslavia

Yugoslavia Under-20
- Association: Football Association of Yugoslavia
- Confederation: UEFA (Europe)
- FIFA code: YUG
First colours	Second colours

FIFA U-20 World Cup
- Appearances: 2 (first in 1979)
- Best result: Winners: 1987

The Yugoslavia national under-20 football team (Serbo-Croatian: Omladinska reprezentacija Jugoslavije) represented the Socialist Federal Republic of Yugoslavia at the FIFA World Youth Championship and various friendly youth tournaments in the period between the mid-1970s and the country's dissolution in the early 1990s. It was a feeder team to the Yugoslavia national under-21 football team (which was itself formed following the realignment of UEFA's youth competitions in 1976). However, since FIFA employs the Under-20 format for the World Youth Championship ever since its inception in 1977, the Under-20 selection was only occasionally formed to compete specifically at the tournament, in addition to a handful of other less official friendly tournaments which employ the same age format.

The team which would compete at the World Championship essentially consisted of players who had earlier participated in the UEFA Junior Tournament, which was the European Under-18 championship (held annually from 1957 to 1984 and then bi-annually from 1986 to 1992) and which doubled as the European qualifying tournament for the World Championship.

== History ==
Yugoslavia Under-20 had appeared at two World Youth Championships throughout their existence. Their first appearance came at the 1979 tournament, where they were knocked out in the group stage after two defeats (0–2 against Poland and 0–1 against Argentina) and one win (5–0 against Indonesia). Their second appearance in the 1987 tournament was much more successful, as they won the competition, remarkably defeating each of the three other semi-finalists and eliminating the defending champions Brazil during the course of the tournament, with Robert Prosinečki winning the Golden Ball award for Best Player of the tournament.

In their two appearances Yugoslavia set a FIFA World Youth Championship scoring record which still stands today, scoring an average of 3.66 goals per game, finishing with 22 goals for and 9 against. The team, coached by Mirko Jozić, had included a number of players who later appeared at FIFA World Cups, such as Zvonimir Boban, Davor Šuker, Robert Jarni, Igor Štimac, Branko Brnović and Predrag Mijatović.

The last European U-18 tournament (and therefore the last U-20 World Cup qualifiers) in which Yugoslavia participated before the country dissolved was the 1992 European Under-18 Championship, and the Under-18's last competitive game was played on 17 October 1991 against Czechoslovakia national under-18 football team.

FIFA attributes all Yugoslav national team's records to the present-day Serbia national football team and as such the Yugoslavia Under-20 results and records are officially inherited by Serbia. Only Croatia and Serbia under-20 teams have managed to qualify for the World Youth Championship since the dissolution of Yugoslavia and are thus the only under-20 ex-Yugoslav teams to have fielded teams for competitive matches at that age level since 1992.

== Tournament records ==
FIFA World Youth Championship Record

Year	Round	GP	W	D*	L	GS	GA
(Tunisia) 1977	did not qualify	–	–	–	–	–	–
(Japan) 1979	First round	3	1	0	2	5	3
(Australia) 1981	did not qualify	–	–	–	–	–	–
(Mexico) 1983	did not qualify	–	–	–	–	–	–
(Soviet Union) 1985	did not qualify	–	–	–	–	–	–
(Chile) 1987	Champions	6	5	1	0	17	6
(Saudi Arabia) 1989	did not qualify	–	–	–	–	–	–
(Portugal) 1991	did not qualify	–	–	–	–	–	–
(Australia) 1993	did not qualify	–	–	–	–	–	–
Total	2/9	9	6	1	2	22	9

*Denotes draws including knockout matches decided on penalty kicks.

== Players ==
The following players were members of Yugoslavia Under-20 squads at the FIFA U-20 World Cup as well as various national squads at FIFA World Cup tournaments.

Player	Position	Youth World Cup	World Cup(s)	Refs
Tomislav Ivković	Goalkeeper	1979	1990 (YUG)	
Ivan Pudar	Goalkeeper	1979	1982 (YUG)	
Zvonko Živković	Forward	1979	1982 (YUG)	
Ivan Gudelj	Forward	1979	1982 (YUG)	
Dragoje Leković	Goalkeeper	1987	1990 (YUG), 1998 (FRY)	
Branko Brnović	Defender	1987	1998 (FRY)	
Robert Jarni	Defender	1987	1990 (YUG), 1998 (CRO), 2002 (CRO)	
Igor Štimac	Defender	1987	1998 (CRO)	
Zvonimir Boban	Midfielder	1987	1998 (CRO)	
Robert Prosinečki	Midfielder	1987	1990 (YUG), 1998 (CRO), 2002 (CRO)	
Predrag Mijatović	Forward	1987	1998 (FRY)	
Davor Šuker	Forward	1987	1990 (YUG), 1998 (CRO), 2002 (CRO)	

Letters in brackets denote national teams players represented at World Cups:

- YUG – Yugoslavia
- CRO – Croatia
- FRY – Federal Republic of Yugoslavia

=== Scorers ===
The following players scored goals for the Yugoslavia Under-20 team at Youth World Cups. The team's overall top scorer was Davor Šuker, who scored 6 goals for Yugoslavia at the 1987 U-20 World Cup, and went on to become top scorer at the 1998 FIFA World Cup eleven years later, where he represented Croatia and also scored 6 goals.

Rank	Player	Goals	Tournament	Refs
1	Davor Šuker	6	1987	
2	Zvonimir Boban	3	1987	
2	Predrag Mijatović	3	1987	
4	Nedeljko Milosavljević	2	1979	
4	Haris Smajić	2	1979	
4	Igor Štimac	2	1987	
7	Branko Brnović	1	1987	
7	Marko Mlinarić	1	1979	
7	Robert Prosinečki	1	1987	
7	Ranko Zirojević	1	1987	

== Head-to-head record ==
The following table shows Yugoslavia's head-to-head record in FIFA U-20 World Cup.

Opponent	Pld	W	D	L	GF	GA	GD	Win %
Argentina	1	0	0	1	0	1	−1	0.00
Australia	1	1	0	0	4	0	+4	100.00
Brazil	1	1	0	0	2	1	+1	100.00
Chile	1	1	0	0	4	2	+2	100.00
East Germany	1	1	0	0	2	1	+1	100.00
Germany	1	0	1	0	1	1	+0	0.00
Indonesia	1	1	0	0	5	0	+5	100.00
Poland	1	0	0	1	0	2	−2	0.00
Togo	1	1	0	0	4	1	+3	100.00
Total	9	6	1	2	22	9	+13	66.67

=== Full squads ===
- 1979 FIFA World Youth Championship squad
- 1987 FIFA World Youth Championship squad

== See also ==
- Serbia national under-20 football team
- Yugoslavia national under-21 football team
- Yugoslavia national under-20 football team
- Yugoslavia national under-19 football team
- Yugoslavia national under-16 football team
- Yugoslavia national under-12 football team
- Yugoslavia national football team

=== Teams from successor states ===
Following the country's dissolution in 1992, the team was succeeded by Under-20 teams of the newly formed ex-Yugoslav states' national teams:

- Bosnia and Herzegovina national football team (1993–present)
- Croatia national football team (1990–present)
- Macedonia national football team (1993–present)
- Slovenia national football team (1992–present)
- FR Yugoslavia national football team (1993–2003) - renamed Serbia and Montenegro national football team and competed under that name 2003–2006 when it was dissolved and succeeded by:
  - Serbia national football team (2006–present)
  - Montenegro national football team (2006–present)
