= Camilo Pino =

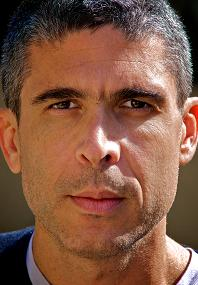
Camilo Pino by Rafael E Rodriguez

Camilo Pino La Corte is a Venezuelan novelist. He was born in Caracas, Venezuela in 1970, the son of historian Elias Pino Iturrieta. He is the author of Crema Paraíso (Alianza, 2020), Mandrágora (SED, 2017) and Valle Zamuro, (Pre-Textos and Punto Cero, 2011).

Pino studied journalism at the Universidad Central de Venezuela and communications at the University of Westminster. He also studied poetry at the Centro de Estudios Latinoamericanos Rómulo Gallegos.

In 1986, Pino founded the magazine Al Encuentro.

In 2010 he was awarded the Carolina Coronado Prize for literature in Venezuela for his debut novel Valle Zamuro. In evaluating the work, Spanish novelist Almudena Grandes said, "[Pino] has debuted with an extraordinary and splendid work" which has "...changed the way I read novels."

A selected group of Venezuelan intellectuals and writers included Valle Zamuro in the Prodavinci.com list of ten best books of the year 2011.

Pino currently lives in Miami, Florida, where he develops literary adaptations for television.
