= Kurt Reynolds =

British ice hockey player

- Born: 31 October 1986 (age 38); Basingstoke, England
- Height: 5 ft 10 in (178 cm)
- Weight: 167 lb (76 kg; 11 st 13 lb)
- Position: Defence
- Shoots: Left
- EIHL team: Basingstoke Bison
- Playing career: 2007–present

Kurt Reynolds (born 31 October 1986 in Basingstoke) is a British professional ice hockey defenceman currently without a club. He most recently played for the Basingstoke Bison in the Elite Ice Hockey League.

Reynolds began his hockey career in his native England in Guildford playing for their various teams. In 2003, Reynolds moved to the United States, playing for the Soo Indians. After spending time with the Great Britain under 18 team, and playing in the World Junior Hockey Championship, Reynolds moved to the Atlantic Junior Hockey League with the Hartford Jr. Wolfpack in a two-year spell. In 2007, Reynolds returned to the UK with the Bracknell Bees of the English Premier Ice Hockey League. He also played two games in the Elite League with the Nottingham Panthers. In 2008, Reynolds signed with the Elite League's Basingstoke Bison. In 2018, the club held a testimonial match to honour his career, as he took a time-out from hockey.
