= Igor Štimac =

Croatian football manager (born 1967)

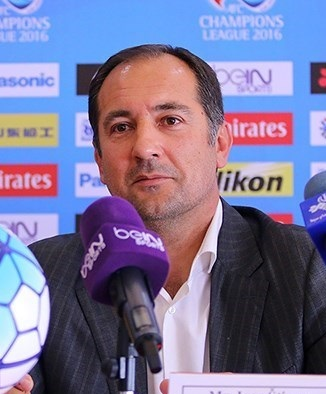
- Štimac as Sepahan manager in 2016

Personal information
- Date of birth: 6 September 1967 (age 59)
- Place of birth: Metković, SR Croatia, SFR Yugoslavia
- Height: 1.88 m (6 ft 2 in)
- Position: Centre-back

Youth career
- Neretva Metković
- 1984–1985: Hajduk Split

Senior career*
Years	Team	Apps	(Gls)
1985–1992	Hajduk Split	64	(3)
1986–1987	→ Dinamo Vinkovci (loan)	31	(2)
1992–1994	Cádiz	62	(4)
1994–1995	Hajduk Split	27	(2)
1995–1999	Derby County	84	(3)
1999–2001	West Ham United	43	(1)
2001–2002	Hajduk Split	11	(2)
Total		322	(17)

International career
1987	Yugoslavia U20	14	(2)
1990–2002	Croatia	53	(2)

Managerial career
- 2005: Hajduk Split
- 2006: Cibalia
- 2009–2010: NK Zagreb
- 2012–2013: Croatia
- 2015: Zadar
- 2015–2016: Sepahan
- 2016–2017: Al-Shahania
- 2019–2024: India
- 2021–2024: India U23
- 2025–2026: Zrinjski Mostar
Medal record
Men's football
Representing Yugoslavia
Gold medal – first place	FIFA U-20 World Cup	1987
Silver medal – second place	UEFA U-21 Euro	1990
Representing Croatia
Bronze medal – third place	FIFA World Cup	1998
- * Club domestic league appearances and goals

Igor Štimac (pronounced [îgor ʃtǐːmats]; born 6 September 1967) is a Croatian professional football manager and former player.

In his playing career, Štimac had three spells with Hajduk Split and also played for Cádiz in Spain, and for Derby County and West Ham United in England. He represented the Croatia national team 53 times, playing at Euro 1996 and at the 1998 World Cup, when Croatia finished third. He also represented Yugoslavia when they won the 1987 FIFA World Youth Championship.

As a manager, Štimac was in charge of the Croatia national team from 2012 to 2013. In club football, he has had brief spells in charge of Hajduk Split, Cibalia, NK Zagreb, Zadar, Iranian club Sepahan and Qatari club Al-Shahania. On 15 May 2019, he was appointed as the head coach of the India national football team on a two-year contract, where he served as the head coach until 2024. Štimac then became manager of Bosnian Premier League side Zrinjski Mostar in 2025.

== Club career ==
At the club level Štimac played for his local Croatian club Hajduk Split and, most notably, the English club Derby County. Štimac arrived at the Baseball Ground on 31 October 1995 for a fee of £1.5 million from Hajduk Split. He scored a goal on his debut for the Rams away at Tranmere, but the Rams fell to a heavy 5–1 defeat. The rest of the season was more successful, as Derby gained promotion and remained unbeaten in 20 consecutive matches. During this time he formed a strong partnership with Dean Yates in the centre of Derby's defence.

Štimac played nearly four years with the Rams, and made 84 league appearances for the Rams, in addition to seven FA Cup appearances and two League Cup appearances. He was sold on 29 August 1999 to West Ham United for £600,000, where he scored once, against Newcastle United.

== International career ==
Štimac played for the Croatia national team, winning 53 caps and scoring two goals, and formed part of a Croatia squad that won the bronze medal at the 1998 FIFA World Cup. His final international was a February 2002 friendly match against Bulgaria.

Previously, Štimac was a member of the highly talented Yugoslavia under-20 team that won the 1987 FIFA World Youth Championship in Chile, playing four games and scoring two goals in the tournament.

=== International goals ===
Goal	Date	Venue	Opponent	Score	Result	Competition
1	3 September 1995	Maksimir, Zagreb, Croatia	Estonia	6 – 1	7 – 1	Euro 1996 Qualifying
2	26 March 1996	Stadion Varteks, Varaždin, Croatia	Israel	1 – 0	2 – 0	Friendly

== Managerial career ==
=== Early days ===
Štimac started his managerial career in 2001, taking charge of the Hajduk Split football academy and also acting as the club's sport director. Hajduk won two championships during this time (2003–04 and 2004–05). In 2004–05 season he took managerial position for the last 10 games after replacing Blaž Slišković. With many difficulties he managed to win championship but lost the cup final to HNK Rijeka. In the spring of 2006, he also spent a few months coaching Croatian first division side Cibalia, saving them from relegation. On 14 September 2009, he was appointed as the new NK Zagreb manager after they lost the first seven games of the season, replacing Luka Pavlović. However Štimac managed to save NK Zagreb from relegation and left the club at the end of the season.

=== Croatia national team ===
On 5 July 2012, Štimac was appointed as the new Croatia national football team manager, after the departure of his former national team teammate Slaven Bilić. His first match as Croatia manager came in a friendly game against Switzerland at Poljud Stadium, which ended in a disappointing 2–4 loss. Despite that loss, Croatia entered the 2014 World Cup qualifies in decent fashion, taking 16 points from first six games. However, the results were not representative of Croatia's form on the pitch, as the team only had a goal difference of +7 from those six matches and scored the majority of their goals from set pieces, counterattacks, and defensive errors by their opponents. Then started a period of very poor results starting with a 0–1 loss to Scotland at Maksimir on 7 June 2013. Following this Croatia lost 0–1 in a friendly match to Portugal on 10 June 2013 and then barely beat 148th ranked Liechtenstein 3–2 in a friendly match thanks to an 86th-minute goal by Eduardo on 14 August 2013.

In their next world cup qualifying match, Croatia drew 1–1 against rivals Serbia in Belgrade, despite only having one shot on target and two shots overall. This was followed by another loss at home at Maksimir, this time to eventual group winners Belgium with a result of 1–2. With only one World Cup qualifying match to go, Štimac had become widely unpopular in Croatia with one poll conducted by popular domestic newspaper 24sata resulting in 98% of voters in favor of sacking Štimac. On 15 October 2013, Croatia lost their final World Cup qualifying match 0–2 against Scotland. After the 0–2 loss to Scotland, Štimac tendered his resignation to the HNS president, former star footballer and national team teammate of Štimac, Davor Šuker. The following day, Šuker accepted his resignation. Croatia ending qualifying as the second to last ranked second place team, having only one more point than last placed Denmark, thus taking the final play-off round spot.

Despite some criticism Štimac managed to take the FIFA Ranking of Croatia to 4th position just behind Spain, Germany and Argentina, respectively. Players like Mateo Kovačić and Alen Halilović also made their debuts for the Croatia national team during Štimac's stint.

=== Zadar ===
In the beginning of 2015, Štimac was named as new manager at Prva HNL club Zadar. Štimac quit after only six months in charge, as club was administratively relegated to second division by the licensing board of the HNS due to financial irregularities 3 games before the league ended. Following Štimac's resignation, Zadar club president Josip Bajlo said, "I would like to thank Mr. Štimac for the five months that he has worked in Zadar, and he has still done the best in such situation".

=== Sepahan ===
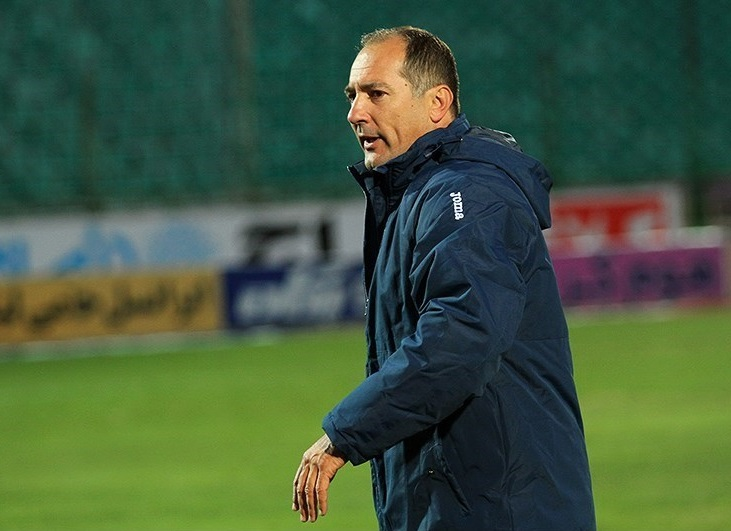
Štimac managing Sepahan in 2015

On 12 November 2015, Štimac became manager of Sepahan, replacing Hossein Faraki. He resigned as Sepahan head coach on 20 April 2016, after a run of unsuccessful results which led Sepahan in the 11th place and out of both season's cups, Hazfi Cup and AFC Champions League.

=== India national team ===
On 15 May 2019, the All India Football Federation announced Štimac as the country's head coach after the departure of Stephen Constantine. His first campaign with India was 2019 King's Cup where his first match as head coach was against Curaçao, which ended up as a 3−1 loss where he gave six players their international debut but in the next match against the host Thailand he managed the team to a 1−0 victory earning third place in the tournament and his first win as head coach.

For 2022 World Cup qualification, Štimac's campaign with India started with a 1–2 home loss to Oman, but he steered the team to a respectable draw against the 2019 Asian Champion and 2022 FIFA World Cup hosts Qatar. Despite this, India only managed draws against much lower ranked teams, Bangladesh at home and Afghanistan away. India were beaten by Oman and Qatar, gained only a draw with Afghanistan, and their only win in qualification came with a 2–0 victory over neighbour Bangladesh. A third place finish with only six points meant India did not qualify for the 2022 FIFA World Cup. However, it was India's highest position since the 2002 qualification and guaranteed India a place in the upcoming 2023 AFC Asian Cup qualification.

Under Štimac, India reached the 2023 AFC Asian Cup finals in Qatar after a 2–0 victory over Cambodia, a 2–1 victory over Afghanistan and a 4–0 victory over Hong Kong, on 8, 11 and 14 June 2022 respectively, at the Vivekananda Yuba Bharati Krirangan stadium in Kolkata. This was the first time India qualified twice in a row for the AFC Asian Cup.

==== 2023: unbeaten runs ====
As coach of the India national team, Štimac achieved 12 victories (up to 9 June 2023) when India overcame Mongolia 2–0 at the Kalinga Stadium in Bhubaneshwar, Odisha. This surpassed his previous best of 11 wins as coach for NK Zagreb.

On 22 and 28 March 2023 respectively, Štimac led India to a 1–0 victory over Myanmar and a 2–0 victory over Kyrgyzstan at the Khuman Lampak in Imphal. These were the first internationals to be played in northeast India and culminated in India winning the 2023 Tri-Nations Series Trophy, under Štimac's guidance.

On 18 June 2023, under Štimac's leadership, India won a second Intercontinental Cup after overcoming Lebanon 2–0 in the final at the Kalinga Stadium.

Under Štimac, on 24 June 2023 at the Sree Kanteerava Stadium in Bengaluru, India achieved eight consecutive clean sheets with a 2–0 victory over Nepal, breaking the previous record of seven between 3 June 1948 and 23 March 1952. It was also India's ninth consecutive clean sheet at home (stretching back to the 4–0 victory over Hong Kong on 14 June 2022), the 11th of an undefeated run (from the 22 March 2023 victory over Myanmar), and the 15th undefeated at home (since a 15 October 2019 draw with Bangladesh). The latter run includes 10 wins, three draws and two draws that ended as penalty shoot-out wins - the last being an extended penalty shoot-out victory at home against Kuwait on 4 July 2023 in the 2023 SAFF Championship Final.

Štimac became the first foreign head coach to win back-to-back SAFF Championship titles. The 2023 SAFF Championship was the first time India had defeated two West Asian countries in back-to-back matches, after winning the semi-final against Lebanon, also on penalties.

==== 2024: Poor run and termination ====
India lost all matches in the group stage, against Australia (0–2), Uzbekistan (0–3), and Syria (0-1). India was the worst-ranked according to points table and goal difference in the competition. Following the poor run of results during the AFC Asian cup and India's second round exit during the 2026 FIFA World Cup qualification campaign, Štimac was sacked by the AIFF on 24 June 2024.

=== Zrinjski Mostar ===
On 1 August 2025, Štimac was appointed as the new manager of Bosnian Premier League club Zrinjski Mostar. He debuted as manager on 7 August in the UEFA Europa League third qualifying round first leg against Icelandic side Breiðablik, drawing 1–1. In October 2025, he courted controversy by using the acronym of the World War II Ustasha salute Za dom spremni (ZDS) in a social media post. Štimac led the team to a 23rd place finish in the UEFA Conference League league phase, eventually getting knocked out in the knockout phase play-offs by Crystal Palace.

Štimac oversaw some poor performances in the league after early success, which included a 3–0 loss to title challengers and rivals Borac Banja Luka in February 2026, led by Stefan Savić who assisted all three goals. Nonetheless, he guided Zrinjski to the Bosnian Supercup title against Sarajevo on 18 March, which marked his first trophy with the club. Zrinjski finished the league season in second place, and managed to defeat cross-town rivals Velež in the two-legged Bosnian Cup final in May.

On 12 June 2026, Zrinjski announced that Štimac had left the club by mutual consent.

== Managerial statistics ==
As of match played 26 May 2026

Managerial record by team and tenure
Team	Nat	From	To	Record				
Team	Nat	From	To	P	W	D	L	Win %
Hajduk Split	(Croatia)	10 April 2005	1 July 2005	12	4	5	3	33.3
NK Zagreb	(Croatia)	14 September 2009	14 May 2010	23	9	6	8	39.1
Croatia	(Croatia)	5 July 2012	16 October 2013	15	8	2	5	53.3
Zadar	(Croatia)	8 January 2015	16 July 2015	19	5	4	10	26.3
Sepahan	(Iran)	11 November 2015	21 April 2016	21	3	9	9	14.3
Al-Shahania	(Qatar)	28 December 2016	23 May 2017	14	1	7	6	7.1
India	(India)	15 May 2019	11 June 2024	53	19	14	20	35.8
India U23	(India)	1 October 2021	11 June 2024	3	2	0	1	66.7
Zrinjski Mostar	(Bosnia and Herzegovina)	1 August 2025	12 June 2026	57	31	14	12	54.4
Total				217	82	61	74	37.8

== Honours ==
=== Player ===
Hajduk Split

- Croatian First League: 1992, 1994–95
- Croatian Cup: 1995
- Yugoslav Cup: 1991
- Croatian Super Cup: 1994

Derby County

- First Division runner-up: 1995–96

Yugoslavia U-20

- FIFA U-20 World Cup: 1987

Croatia

- FIFA World Cup third place: 1998

=== Manager ===
Hajduk Split

- Croatian First League: 2004–05

India

- SAFF Championship: 2021, 2023
- Tri-Nation Series: 2023
- InterContinental Cup: 2023

Zrinjski Mostar

- Bosnian Cup: 2025–26
- Bosnian Supercup: 2025

=== Orders ===
- Order of Danica Hrvatska with face of Franjo Bučar – 1995
- Order of the Croatian Trefoil – 1998
