= Zvonimir Boban =

Croatian footballer (born 1968)

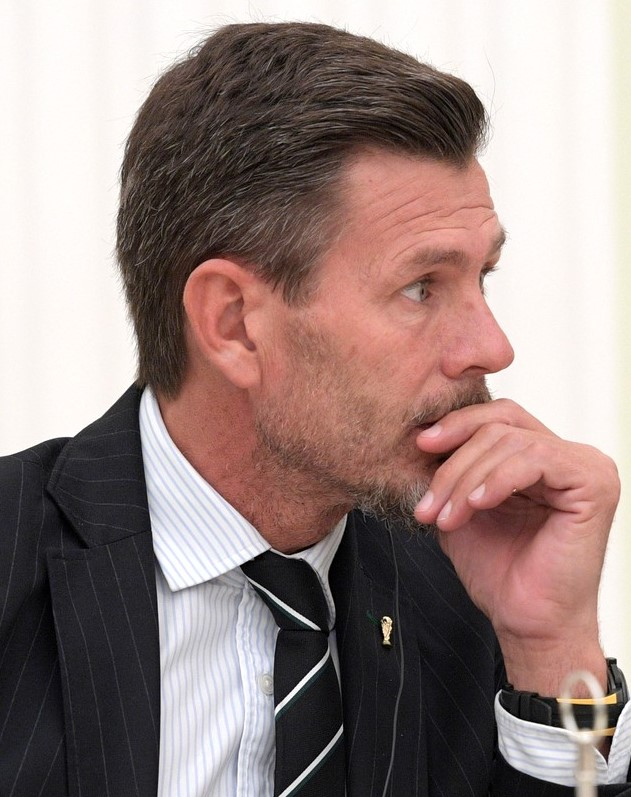
- Boban in 2018

President of Dinamo Zagreb
- Incumbent
- Assumed office 16 September 2025
- Preceded by: Velimir Zajec

Personal details
- Born: 8 October 1968 (age 58) Imotski, Croatia
- Height: 1.83 m (6 ft 0 in)
- Spouse: Leonarda Lončar (m. 1994)
- Children: 5
- Education: University of Zagreb (BA)
- Occupation: Footballer; Football administrator
Association football career
- Position: Midfielder
Youth career
- 1978–1981: Mračaj Runović
- 1981–1982: Hajduk Split
- 1983–1985: Dinamo Zagreb
Senior career*
Years	Team	Apps	(Gls)
1985–1991	Dinamo Zagreb	112	(45)
1991–2001	AC Milan	178	(21)
1991–1992	→ Bari (loan)	17	(2)
2001	→ Celta Vigo (loan)	4	(0)
Total		311	(68)
International career
1987	Yugoslavia U20	6	(3)
1988–1991	Yugoslavia	7	(1)
1992–1999	Croatia	49	(12)
Medal record
Men's football
Representing Yugoslavia
FIFA U-20 World Cup
Winner	1987 Chile
UEFA European Under-21 Championship
Runner-up	1990
Representing Croatia
FIFA World Cup
Third place	1998 France
- * Club domestic league appearances and goals

Zvonimir Boban (Croatian pronunciation: [zʋônimiːr bǒban]; born 8 October 1968) is a Croatian former professional footballer who played as a midfielder, deployed mostly as a central or attacking midfielder. He was known for his technical ability, long-range shooting, and game intelligence. He has served as president of Dinamo Zagreb since 2025. From 2016 to 2019, he worked as Deputy Secretary General of FIFA, helping develop the implementation of VAR technology. He was an advisor to UEFA from 2021 to 2024. Boban is a football pundit on Croatian and Italian television, working most notably for Sky Italia and RTL Televizija.

Boban began his career in Dinamo Zagreb, scoring 45 goals for the club between 1985 and 1991. He played the majority of his career at AC Milan from 1991 to 2001, where he won three Italian Super Cups (1992, 1993, 1994), four Serie A titles (1993, 1994, 1996, 1999) and the 1994 UEFA Champions League. He debuted for Croatia national football team in 1990, where he led the nation's "Golden Generation" as its third longest-serving captain. The team won third place at the 1998 FIFA World Cup, securing the country's first World Cup medal. He was named Croatian Footballer of the Year in 1991 and 1999.

== Club career ==
=== Dinamo Zagreb ===
Born in Imotski, Boban started his career with Dinamo Zagreb. He made his debut for the team in the 1985–86 season, aged 16. He would play 109 games for the club over six seasons, scoring 45 goals and becoming club captain aged 19.

==== Dinamo Zagreb–Red Star Belgrade riot ====
In a game against Red Star Belgrade on 13 May 1990, Boban kicked a police officer in the face for assaulting a Dinamo supporter after a riot broke out in the stadium. This incident made Boban an icon of resistance in Croatia.

It is cited by some as the expression of Croatian discontent with the Yugoslav regime. It also earned him a suspension from the Yugoslav national team, causing him to miss the 1990 World Cup in Italy. In January 2011, the match (due to the incident) was named by CNN as one of "five football games that changed the world". The police officer (who turned out to be a Bosniak) later forgave Boban for his action.

=== Serie A ===
AC Milan signed Boban in 1991 in a deal worth £8 million. Milan immediately loaned him to Bari, as they felt he needed time to settle in Italy without counting as one of the 3 non-Italian players the club was limited to at the time. Bari were relegated in this season, but Boban ably demonstrated his ability in the team and was recalled to Milan. He stayed in the club for nine seasons, and enjoyed great success with them, helping the team to the 1994 Champions League title and contributing to the 1995 campaign in which they ended as runners-up. Playing 251 games for Milan and scoring 30 goals, Boban won four Serie A titles, as well as three Italian Supercups. In the second leg of the 1994 European Super Cup final against Arsenal in Milan, he scored the opening goal in Milan's 2–0 aggregate victory. In August 2001, with his role at Milan diminished due to the signing of Rui Costa, he was loaned to La Liga side Celta Vigo where he played in only four league matches. Unhappy with his role as a substitute, he retired in October 2001 and finished his last season earlier than he intended.

== International career ==
=== Yugoslavia ===
Boban played a big part in Yugoslavia's win in 1987 World Youth Championship. He scored three goals for Yugoslavia in this tournament, and also scored a decisive penalty in the final shootout. At the full international level, he earned seven caps for Yugoslavia between 1988 and 1991, debuting against the Republic of Ireland on 27 April 1988. He played his last game for Yugoslavia on 16 May 1991 against the Faroe Islands, during which he scored his only goal for Yugoslavia.

=== Croatia ===
When the nation of Croatia declared its independence of Yugoslavia, Boban left Yugoslavia to play for Croatia. He played his first international match for Croatia against a Romanian side on 22 December 1990. The match was considered unofficial because Croatia at that time was not affiliated to FIFA. This match was only the second fixture Croatia had played as an independent nation since 1956. Boban played his last match for the national team in a friendly against France on 13 November 1999. He blamed back pain for his decision to quit international football, but would go on to play in two more seasons of club football. In his career with the Croatia national team, Boban won 49 international caps and scored 12 goals.

==== 1998 World Cup ====
Boban was a member of the Croatian team that finished third at the 1998 World Cup, captaining the squad at that tournament, as he had at the UEFA Euro 1996. At the tournament, he sported a slightly unusual haircut with his number 10 shaved onto the back of his head and highlighted in red dye. A mistake he made in the semi-final allowed France to equalize immediately after Croatia had fought hard to earn a one-goal lead. To make matters worse, Boban was injured and wanted to come off at half time but stayed on until the 65th minute, when he was replaced by Silvio Marić. France won the match 2–1 and eventually won the tournament. Croatia went on to defeat the Netherlands, with Boban providing the pass to Davor Šuker to score the winner, allowing Croatia to attain third place and receive the bronze medal.

== Style of play ==
Nicknamed Zorro, Boban was a talented and creative yet tenacious and hard-working player, known for his use of feints to beat opponents. He was gifted with excellent vision, passing range, dribbling skills, technical ability, and an eye for the final ball; he mixed these attributes with a unique tactical versatility and intelligence, which enabled him to be deployed in several midfield and offensive positions throughout his career. In addition to his preferred playmaking role behind the forwards as an attacking midfielder, he was also capable of playing on the wing, as a central midfielder, or even as a supporting striker, due to his powerful and accurate bending shots from distance; he was also effective from set-pieces. Throughout his career, he also became known for his vocal presence, determination and aggression on the pitch, as well as his strong character.

== Post-playing career ==
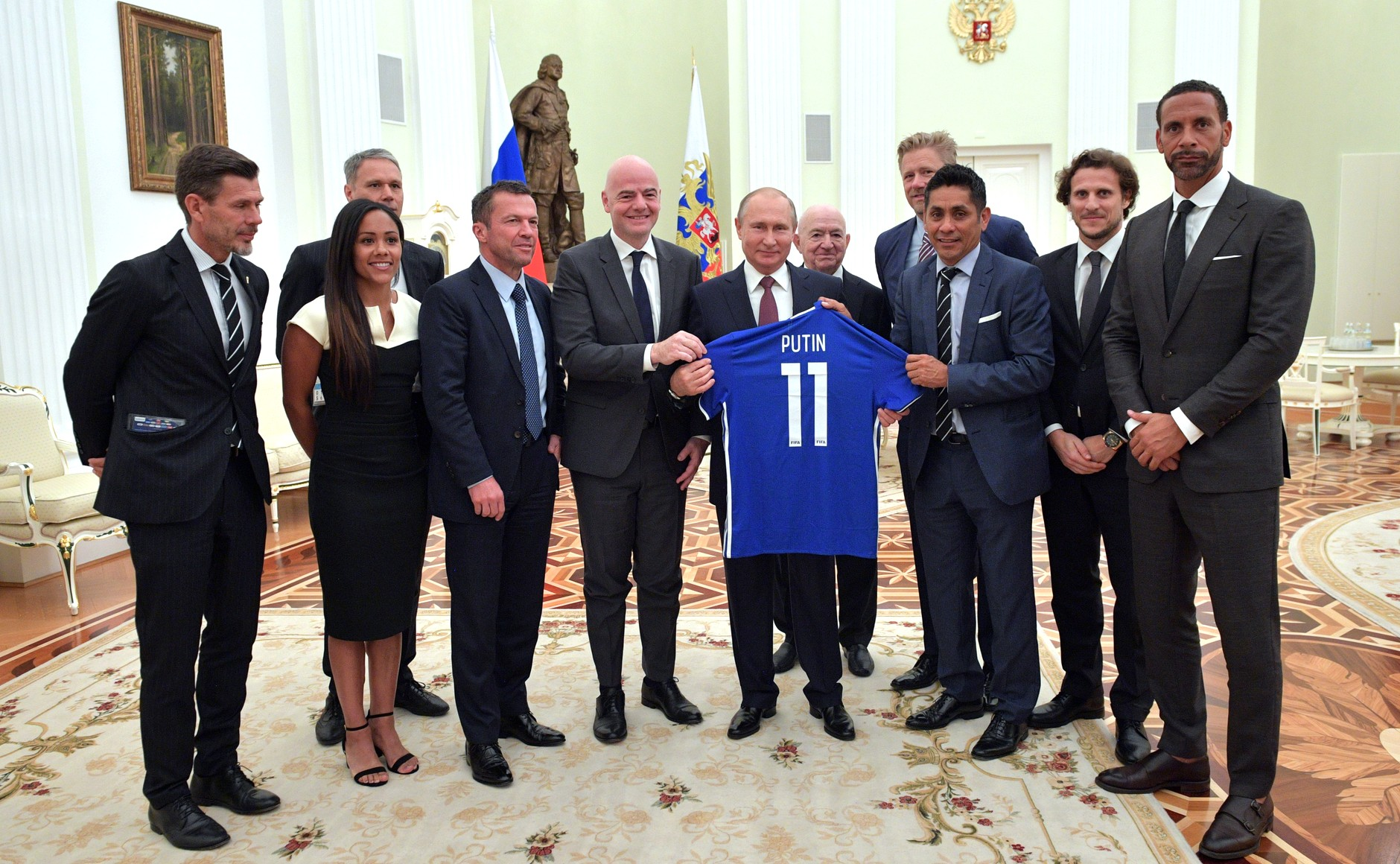
Boban (far left) with Russian President Vladimir Putin (centre) at the 2018 FIFA World Cup in Russia

Boban officially retired from football in 2002 after receiving little pitch time at Celta Vigo. On 7 October 2002, Boban organised and played in a farewell testimonial, with Croatia's 1998 World Cup team supported by tennis star Goran Ivanišević matching up against a World XI featuring such stars as Rivaldo, Marco van Basten and Lothar Matthäus.

Since retiring from football, Boban, always known to be a literary man, completed his history degree at the University of Zagreb. He graduated from the Faculty of Humanities and Social Sciences, University of Zagreb in 2004, with a thesis named "Christianity in the Roman Empire".

He also started a career in sports journalism, being the administration president for the Croatian daily sports newspaper Sportske novosti, a co-commentator during live broadcasts of the Croatia national team's away matches on the country's commercially funded national TV station RTL Televizija as well as a commentator for SKY Italia and columnist for La Gazzetta dello Sport. As a commentator, Boban has become known as frank and outspoken. Boban also owns a restaurant in Zagreb, called "Boban".

Boban has always maintained that he would never become a coach.

Football has broadened my horizons. For a while, I will take a rest from it but one thing is certain. Never, never shall I become a coach. My nerves are not up to it.

— Zvonimir Boban, interview after retirement

=== FIFA ===
On 30 May 2016, Boban was appointed FIFA's Deputy Secretary-General, focusing on developing the game and the organization of competitions. He has been immediately among the endorsers of the implementation of technology on the field and played a fundamental role in the development of the video assistant referee. In fact, during the 2018 World Cup played in Russia, the first-ever with the VAR, he lived in Moscow alongside Pierluigi Collina, chairman of FIFA's Referees' Committee, and Massimo Busacca, head of FIFA's Refereeing Department, thus bringing referees' world closer to the Institutions. On 14 June 2019, after three years in office, he resigned. FIFA President Gianni Infantino had words of thanks for the Croatian: "I cannot thank Zvonimir enough for everything he has done for FIFA and for the game of football over the last three years by our side. Nobody embodies football better than he does and he has always worked for the good of the game. Many of the positive changes that we have made over the last three years could not have been achieved without Zvone. He has shown the same commitment, heart, and passion at FIFA that characterized his attitude on the pitch. We will miss him a lot at FIFA." One of Infantino's collaborators at FIFA said it was a massive loss, especially now that his work was beginning to make a difference for the whole organization.

=== AC Milan ===
In June 2019, Boban resigned from his FIFA job to return to his former club AC Milan where he was hired as a Chief Football Officer, the closest cooperator of the club's technical director Paolo Maldini. However, he was sacked on 7 March 2020, after he publicly criticized club CEO Ivan Gazidis, who negotiated a possible job offer with German manager Ralf Rangnick for the 2020−21 season behind Boban and Maldini's backs.

=== UEFA ===
In April 2021, Boban was hired by UEFA as the Chief of Football, first ever person to hold that position. He later resigned in January 2024 in protest against proposed changes to UEFA's statutes that could have allowed Aleksander Čeferin to seek another term as president after 2027, arguing that altering the rules would create a serious governance issue. Boban described the proposal as "fatal" and said that accepting such a decision would go against his principles and values.

=== GNK Dinamo ===
In April 2025, Boban was announced as new chairman of the board of GNK Dinamo Zagreb returning to the club he was captain of after almost 34 years. Boban would run entire sports policy of the club. His official term as chairman of the board started at 1 June 2025.

== Personal life ==
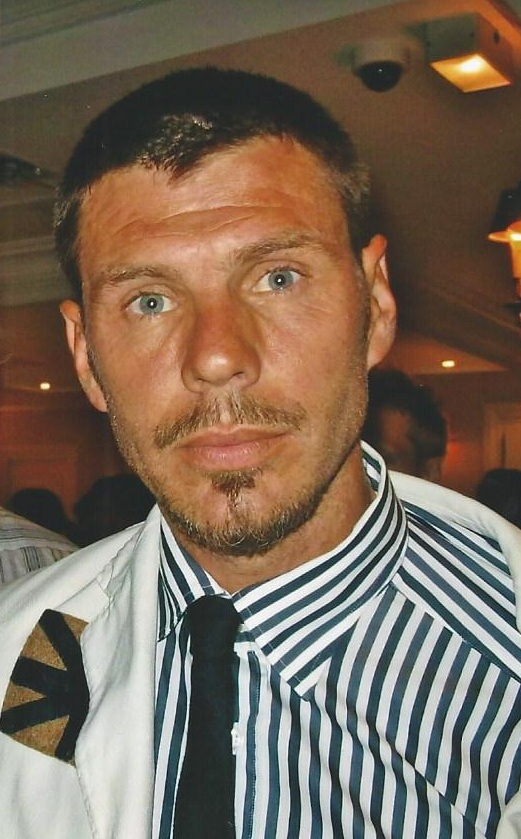
Boban in 2008

Boban married Leonarda Lončar, a fashion designer, in 1994. They have five children. In 2021, the couple separated, but they reunited in 2024.

Boban is a keen tennis player. He is known to be close friends with Goran Ivanišević, with whom he plays at his private indoor clay tennis court.

== Career statistics ==
=== Club ===
Appearances and goals by club, season and competition
Club	Season	League			National cup (Note: Includes Yugoslav Cup, Coppa Italia, Copa del Rey.)		Continental		Other		Total	
Club	Season	Division	Apps	Goals	Apps	Goals	Apps	Goals	Apps	Goals	Apps	Goals
Dinamo Zagreb	1985–86	Yugoslav First League	2	0	0	0	0	0	–		2	0
Dinamo Zagreb	1986–87	Yugoslav First League	28	8	0	0	0	0	–		28	8
Dinamo Zagreb	1987–88	Yugoslav First League	30	13	1	1	0	0	–		31	14
Dinamo Zagreb	1988–89	Yugoslav First League	0	0	0	0	0	0	–		0	0
Dinamo Zagreb	1989–90	Yugoslav First League	26	9	2	1	2	0	–		30	10
Dinamo Zagreb	1990–91	Yugoslav First League	26	15	2	0	2	1	–		30	16
Dinamo Zagreb	Total		112	45	5	2	4	1	0	0	121	48
Bari	1991–92	Serie A	17	2	0	0	0	0	–		17	2
AC Milan	1992–93	Serie A	13	0	3	0	6	1	–		22	1
AC Milan	1993–94	Serie A	20	4	2	0	8	0	1 (Note: Appearance in Supercoppa Italiana)	0	31	4
AC Milan	1994–95	Serie A	21	1	3	0	11	2	2 (Note: One appearance in Intercontinental Cup; in Supercoppa Italiana)	0	37	3
AC Milan	1995–96	Serie A	13	3	2	0	5	3	1	0	21	7
AC Milan	1996–97	Serie A	28	1	3	0	5	1	–		36	2
AC Milan	1997–98	Serie A	23	2	6	1	0	0	–		29	3
AC Milan	1998–99	Serie A	27	2	4	0	0	0	–		31	2
AC Milan	1999–2000	Serie A	17	6	3	0	2	0	–		22	6
AC Milan	2000–01	Serie A	16	2	3	1	7	0	–		26	3
AC Milan	Total		178	21	29	2	44	7	4	0	255	31
Celta Vigo	2001–02	La Liga	4	0	0	0	2	0	–		6	0
Career total			311	68	34	4	50	8	4	0	399	81

=== International ===
Appearances and goals by national team and year
National team	Year	Apps	Goals
Yugoslavia	1988	2	0
Yugoslavia	1989	1	0
Yugoslavia	1990	2	0
Yugoslavia	1991	2	1
Total		7	1
Croatia	1992	1	0
Croatia	1993	1	0
Croatia	1994	5	0
Croatia	1995	5	2
Croatia	1996	9	2
Croatia	1997	8	3
Croatia	1998	13	5
Croatia	1999	7	0
Total		49	12

Scores and results list Yugoslavia's and Croatia's goal tally first, score column indicates score after each Boban goal.

List of international goals scored by Zvonimir Boban
No.	Date	Venue	Opponent	Score	Result	Competition
Yugoslavia goals
1	16 May 1991	Red Star Stadium, Belgrade, Yugoslavia	Faroe Islands	5–0	7–0	UEFA Euro 1992 qualifying
Croatia goals
1	25 March 1995	Stadion Maksimir, Zagreb, Croatia	Ukraine	1–0	4–0	UEFA Euro 1996 qualifying
2	3 September 1995	Stadion Maksimir, Zagreb, Croatia	Estonia	4–1	7–1	UEFA Euro 1996 qualifying
3	2 June 1996	Lansdowne Road, Dublin, Republic of Ireland	Republic of Ireland	2–1	2–2	Friendly
4	16 June 1996	Hillsborough, Sheffield, England	Denmark	2–0	3–0	UEFA Euro 1996
5	2 April 1997	Stadion Poljud, Split, Croatia	Slovenia	2–0	3–3	1998 FIFA World Cup qualification
6	2 April 1997	Stadion Poljud, Split, Croatia	Slovenia	3–1	3–3	1998 FIFA World Cup qualification
7	6 September 1997	Stadion Maksimir, Zagreb, Croatia	Bosnia and Herzegovina	3–2	3–2	1998 FIFA World Cup qualification
8	22 April 1998	Stadion Gradski vrt, Osijek, Croatia	Poland	1–0	4–1	Friendly
9	6 June 1998	Stadion Maksimir, Zagreb, Croatia	Australia	4–0	7–0	Friendly
10	6 June 1998	Stadion Maksimir, Zagreb, Croatia	Australia	7–0	7–0	Friendly
11	14 October 1998	Stadion Maksimir, Zagreb, Croatia	Macedonia	2–1	3–2	UEFA Euro 2000 qualifying
12	14 October 1998	Stadion Maksimir, Zagreb, Croatia	Macedonia	3–2	3–2	UEFA Euro 2000 qualifying

== Honours ==
AC Milan

- Serie A: 1992–93, 1993–94, 1995–96, 1998–99
- Supercoppa Italiana: 1992, 1993, 1994
- UEFA Champions League: 1993–94
- UEFA Super Cup: 1994

Yugoslavia

- FIFA World Youth Championship: 1987
- UEFA European Under-21 Championship runner-up: 1990

Croatia

- FIFA World Cup third place: 1998

Individual

- FIFA World Youth Championship Silver Ball: 1987
- Croatian Footballer of the Year: 1991, 1999
- Ballon d'Or: 1994 (24th place). Nominated: 1995, 1996, 1998
- SN Yellow Shirt Award: 1991
- Franjo Bučar State Award for Sport: 1998, 2002
- UEFA Jubilee Poll (2004): #92
- AC Milan: The 20 Greatest Rossoneri of All-Time
- AC Milan Hall of Fame
- Fair Play Menarini Award 2017
- Globe Soccer Awards 2018: Special Career Award

Orders

- Order of Danica Hrvatska with face of Franjo Bučar: 1995
- Order of the Croatian Trefoil: 1998
