= 2014 UEFA European Under-17 Championship qualifying round =

The 2014 UEFA European Under-17 Championship qualifying round was the first round of qualification for the final tournament of the 2014 UEFA European Under-17 Championship in Malta. Fifty-two teams entering in this round were drawn into 13 groups of four teams, where they played each other in a single round-robin mini-tournament hosted by one of the group's teams. The 13 group winners, 13 group runners-up and the best third-placed team advanced to the elite round, the second round of qualification.

As hosts, Malta qualified directly for the final tournament, while Germany received a bye to the elite round as the side with the highest competition coefficient. The draw for the qualifying round was held on 5 December 2012 in Nyon, and matches took place between 21 September and 19 November 2013.

== Seeds ==
A total of fifty-two participating teams were divided in two draw pots based on the UEFA Under-17 coefficient ranking. Before the draw UEFA confirmed that, for political reasons, Armenia and Azerbaijan would not host the mini-tournament if they are drawn in the same group due to the dispute concerning territory of Nagorno-Karabakh, with the same rule applying for Georgia and Russia due to the dispute regarding the territory of South Ossetia. The UEFA Executive Committee admitted Gibraltar as a provisional member of UEFA on 1 October 2012. Gibraltar Football Association was admitted as a full member of UEFA at the XXXVII Ordinary UEFA Congress in London in May 2013.

Pot A	Pot B
England; France; Netherlands; Spain; Czech Republic; Portugal; Denmark; Serbia; Georgia; Hungary; Belgium; Turkey; Greece; Switzerland; Republic of Ireland; Italy; Croatia; Romania; Poland; Iceland; Norway; Northern Ireland; Sweden; Scotland; Russia; Belarus	Slovakia; Austria; Ukraine; Luxembourg; Bosnia and Herzegovina; Finland; Israel; Bulgaria; Wales; Lithuania; Montenegro; Azerbaijan; Slovenia; Kazakhstan; Albania; Estonia; Armenia; Macedonia; Cyprus; Latvia; Faroe Islands; Andorra; Moldova; San Marino; Liechtenstein; Gibraltar

== Tiebreakers ==
If two or more teams are equal on points on completion of the group matches, the following criteria are applied to determine the rankings.

1. Higher number of points obtained in the group matches played among the teams in question
2. Superior goal difference from the group matches played among the teams in question
3. Higher number of goals scored in the group matches played among the teams in question
4. If, after applying criteria 1) to 3) to several teams, two teams still have an equal ranking, the criteria 1) to 3) will be reapplied to determine the ranking of these teams. If this procedure does not lead to a decision, criteria 5) and 6) will apply
5. Results of all group matches:
  1. Superior goal difference
  2. Higher number of goals scored
6. Drawing of lots

Additionally, if two teams which have the same number of points and the same number of goals scored and conceded play their last group match against each other and are still equal at the end of that match, their final rankings are determined by the penalty shoot-out and not by the criteria listed above. This procedure is applicable only if a ranking of the teams is required to determine the group winner or the runners-up and the third-placed team.

== Groups ==
The hosts of the thirteen mini-tournament groups are indicated below.

All times are CEST (UTC+02:00) until 26 October 2013 and CET (UTC+01:00) starting from 27 October 2013.

=== Group 1 ===
Pos	Team	Pld	W	D	L	GF	GA	GD	Pts	Qualification
1	Romania	3	3	0	0	4	0	+4	9	Elite round
2	Albania (H)	3	1	1	1	2	2	0	4	Elite round
3	Belarus	3	1	0	2	2	4	−2	3	
4	Finland	3	0	1	2	0	2	−2	1	

(H) Hosts
18 October 2013
14:30

Belarus	1–0	Finland
Vasilyew 67'	Report

Gjorgji Kyçyku Stadium, Pogradec
Referee: Georgi Vadachkoria (Georgia)
18 October 2013
18:00

Romania	1–0	Albania
Ivan 48'	Report

Skënderbeu Stadium, Korçë
Referee: Sergiu Derenov (Moldova)

20 October 2013
14:30

Finland	0–1	Romania
	Report	Ivan 76'

Gjorgji Kyçyku Stadium, Pogradec
Referee: Georgi Vadachkoria (Georgia)
20 October 2013
18:00

Belarus	1–2	Albania
Kozlov 37'	Report	Toli 22'; Bakalli 80+5'

Skënderbeu Stadium, Korçë
Referee: Chris Reisch (Luxembourg)

23 October 2013
14:30

Romania	2–0	Belarus
Stoica 13'; Manea 80+2'	Report

Gjorgji Kyçyku Stadium, Pogradec
Referee: Sergiu Derenov (Moldova)
23 October 2013
14:30

Albania	0–0	Finland
	Report

Skënderbeu Stadium, Korçë
Referee: Chris Reisch (Luxembourg)

=== Group 2 ===
Pos	Team	Pld	W	D	L	GF	GA	GD	Pts	Qualification
1	Italy	3	2	1	0	5	1	+4	7	Elite round
2	Sweden	3	1	1	1	3	3	0	4	Elite round
3	Ukraine	3	0	2	1	2	3	−1	2	Elite round
4	Lithuania (H)	3	0	2	1	1	4	−3	2	

(H) Hosts
19 October 2013
12:00

Italy	2–1	Ukraine
Panico 3', 61'	Report	Taranukha 39'

ARVI Football Arena, Marijampolė
Referee: Radu Petrescu (Romania)
19 October 2013
15:00

Sweden	3–0	Lithuania
Tshakasua 35', 73'; Reuterswärd 39'	Report

Alytus Stadium, Alytus
Referee: Suren Baliyan (Armenia)

21 October 2013
17:00

Italy	0–0	Lithuania
	Report

Alytus Stadium, Alytus
Referee: Suren Baliyan (Armenia)
22 October 2013 ^{†}
14:00

Ukraine	0–0	Sweden
	Report

Darius and Girėnas Stadium, Kaunas
Referee: Nikola Popov (Bulgaria)

24 October 2013
17:00

Sweden	0–3	Italy
	Report	Panico 27'; Locatelli 36'; Caronte 80+1'

ARVI Football Arena, Marijampolė
Referee: Radu Petrescu (Romania)
24 October 2013
17:00

Lithuania	1–1	Ukraine
Fastov 38' (o.g.)	Report	Taranukha 1'

Darius and Girėnas Stadium, Kaunas
Referee: Nikola Popov (Bulgaria)

^{†} On 21 October 2013, the match between Ukraine and Sweden to be played at the ARVI Football Arena in Marijampolė was postponed to the next day due to heavy rain.

=== Group 3 ===
Pos	Team	Pld	W	D	L	GF	GA	GD	Pts	Qualification
1	France	3	2	1	0	7	2	+5	7	Elite round
2	Czech Republic	3	2	0	1	7	5	+2	6	Elite round
3	Israel (H)	3	1	1	1	12	6	+6	4	
4	Liechtenstein	3	0	0	3	0	13	−13	0	

(H) Hosts
22 October 2013
16:00

Czech Republic	4–2	Israel
Pulkrab 34', 39', 47'; Mihálik 80+4'	Report	Hamzey 22' (pen.); Isakov 53'

Itztadion Ramat Gan, Ramat Gan
Referee: Nikola Dabanović (Montenegro)
22 October 2013
16:00

France	2–0	Liechtenstein
Jamrozik 17'; Kwateng 62'	Report

National team complex, Shefayim
Referee: Kevin Azzopardi (Malta)

24 October 2013
16:00

Czech Republic	3–0	Liechtenstein
Januška 7'; Quaderer 27' (o.g.); Štěpánek 79'	Report

National team complex, Shefayim
Referee: Danilo Grujić (Serbia)
24 October 2013
16:00

Israel	2–2	France
Yizhak 18'; Zenati 27'	Report	Dembele 43', 58'

Itztadion Ramat Gan, Ramat Gan
Referee: Nikola Dabanović (Montenegro)

27 October 2013
18:30

France	3–0	Czech Republic
Lusamba 29' (pen.); Saint-Maximin 36', 51'	Report

National team complex, Shefayim
Referee: Danilo Grujić (Serbia)
27 October 2013
18:30

Liechtenstein	0–8	Israel
	Report	Yizhak 4', 28', 29', 33', 62'; Yerushalmi 15', 78'; Hershkovich 48'

Itztadion Ramat Gan, Ramat Gan
Referee: Kevin Azzopardi (Malta)

=== Group 4 ===
Pos	Team	Pld	W	D	L	GF	GA	GD	Pts	Qualification
1	Scotland	3	2	1	0	5	2	+3	7	Elite round
2	Wales	3	1	2	0	8	5	+3	5	Elite round
3	Slovenia (H)	3	1	0	2	5	8	−3	3	
4	Hungary	3	0	1	2	8	11	−3	1	

(H) Hosts
23 September 2013
16:00

Scotland	3–1	Slovenia
Wighton 40' (pen.), 42', 71'	Report	Šušnjara 53'

Bistrica, Bistrica
Referee: Enea Jorgji (Albania)
23 September 2013
16:00

Hungary	5–5	Wales
Sallai 19'; Damásdi 26', 31'; Hursán 38'; Pávkovics 52'	Report	Morrell 12' (pen.); Harries 50'; James 59'; Wilson 62'; Evans 80'

ŠRC Bakovci Stadium, Bakovci
Referee: Aliyar Aghaev (Azerbaijan)

25 September 2013
16:00

Scotland	0–0	Wales
	Report

Bistrica, Bistrica
Referee: Alexandre Boucaut (Belgium)
25 September 2013
16:00

Slovenia	4–2	Hungary
Repas 12'; Tijanić 31', 52'; Šušnjara 72'	Report	Csonka 68'; Pávkovics 77'

ŠRC Bakovci Stadium, Bakovci
Referee: Enea Jorgji (Albania)

28 September 2013
16:00

Hungary	1–2	Scotland
Sallai 38'	Report	Kiltie 37', 66'

ŠRC Bakovci Stadium, Bakovci
Referee: Alexandre Boucaut (Belgium)
28 September 2013
16:00

Wales	3–0	Slovenia
Wilson 37', 66'; G. Thomas 78'	Report

Bistrica, Bistrica
Referee: Aliyar Aghaev (Azerbaijan)

=== Group 5 ===
Pos	Team	Pld	W	D	L	GF	GA	GD	Pts	Qualification
1	Portugal	3	3	0	0	5	1	+4	9	Elite round
2	Bosnia and Herzegovina (H)	3	1	1	1	2	2	0	4	Elite round
3	Croatia	3	1	0	2	1	3	−2	3	
4	Montenegro	3	0	1	2	1	3	−2	1	

(H) Hosts
8 October 2013
15:00

Croatia	1–0	Montenegro
Mrkonjić 80+2'	Report

SRC Slavija, Sarajevo
Referee: Mads-Kristoffer Kristoffersen (Denmark)
8 October 2013
15:00

Portugal	2–0	Bosnia and Herzegovina
Sambu 9', 16'	Report

Asim Ferhatović Hase Stadium, Sarajevo
Referee: Christos Nicolaides (Cyprus)

10 October 2013
15:00

Croatia	0–2	Bosnia and Herzegovina
	Report	Plantak 12' (o.g.); Lelić 76'

Asim Ferhatović Hase Stadium, Sarajevo
Referee: Alexandr Aliyev (Kazakhstan)
10 October 2013
15:00

Montenegro	1–2	Portugal
Vujnović 56'	Report	Rodrigues 50' (pen.); Delgado 77' (pen.)

SRC Slavija, Sarajevo
Referee: Mads-Kristoffer Kristoffersen (Denmark)

13 October 2013
15:00

Portugal	1–0	Croatia
Sanches 24'	Report

Asim Ferhatović Hase Stadium, Sarajevo
Referee: Christos Nicolaides (Cyprus)
13 October 2013
15:00

Bosnia and Herzegovina	0–0	Montenegro
	Report

SRC Slavija, Sarajevo
Referee: Alexandr Aliyev (Kazakhstan)

=== Group 6 ===
Pos	Team	Pld	W	D	L	GF	GA	GD	Pts	Qualification
1	Serbia (H)	3	2	1	0	10	1	+9	7	Elite round
2	Greece	3	2	1	0	4	1	+3	7	Elite round
3	Estonia	3	1	0	2	4	7	−3	3	
4	Andorra	3	0	0	3	0	9	−9	0	

(H) Hosts
1 October 2013
15:30

Greece	3–1	Estonia
Angelopoulos 42'; Dimitriadis 57'; Xiros 80+3'	Report	Käit 80'

FK Obilić, Belgrade
Referee: Thorvaldur Árnason (Iceland)
1 October 2013
15:30

Serbia	6–0	Andorra
Karišić 10'; Jović 27', 32'; Šaponjić 51'; Duronjić 70'; Zlatković 80+3' (pen.)	Report

FK Srem, Jakovo
Referee: Mervyn Smyth (Northern Ireland)

3 October 2013
15:30

Greece	1–0	Andorra
Stathopoulos 79'	Report

FK Obilić, Belgrade
Referee: Thorvaldur Árnason (Iceland)
3 October 2013
15:30

Estonia	1–4	Serbia
Kokla 26'	Report	Šaponjić 29'; Jović 42', 69'; Mijailović 50'

FK Srem, Jakovo
Referee: Aleksandrs Anufrijevs (Latvia)

6 October 2013
15:30

Serbia	0–0	Greece
	Report

FK Rad, Belgrade
Referee: Mervyn Smyth (Northern Ireland)
6 October 2013
15:30

Andorra	0–2	Estonia
	Report	Golovljov 52', 72'

FK Srem, Jakovo
Referee: Aleksandrs Anufrijevs (Latvia)

=== Group 7 ===
Pos	Team	Pld	W	D	L	GF	GA	GD	Pts	Qualification
1	England	3	3	0	0	18	0	+18	9	Elite round
2	Republic of Ireland	3	2	0	1	6	7	−1	6	Elite round
3	Armenia (H)	3	1	0	2	2	7	−5	3	
4	Gibraltar	3	0	0	3	2	14	−12	0	

(H) Hosts
24 October 2013
13:00

England	4–0	Armenia
Roberts 3'; Armstrong 32', 80'; Solanke 75'	Report

FFA Academy Stadium, Yerevan
Referee: Antonis Giachos (Greece)
24 October 2013
15:00

Republic of Ireland	4–1	Gibraltar
Holland 26'; Elworthy 31', 36'; Kinsella 68'	Report	Wink 17'

Yerevan Republican Stadium, Yerevan
Referee: Adrien Jaccottet (Switzerland)

26 October 2013
13:00

Gibraltar	0–8	England
	Report	Armstrong 29', 34'; Ojo 36'; Solanke 42', 74'; Brewitt 48'; Brown 52'; Roberts 62'

FFA Academy Stadium, Yerevan
Referee: Antonis Giachos (Greece)
26 October 2013
15:00

Republic of Ireland	2–0	Armenia
Poynton 30' (pen.); Devers 59'	Report

Yerevan Republican Stadium, Yerevan
Referee: Igor Pristovnik (Croatia)

29 October 2013
13:00

England	6–0	Republic of Ireland
Brown 19', 52'; Armstrong 37', 44'; Roberts 57'; Ledson 80+1'	Report

Yerevan Republican Stadium, Yerevan
Referee: Adrien Jaccottet (Switzerland)
29 October 2013
13:00

Armenia	2–1	Gibraltar
Ilangyozyan 66'; Panosyan 76'	Report	Wink 12'

FFA Academy Stadium, Yerevan
Referee: Igor Pristovnik (Croatia)

=== Group 8 ===
Pos	Team	Pld	W	D	L	GF	GA	GD	Pts	Qualification
1	Spain	3	3	0	0	6	0	+6	9	Elite round
2	Norway	3	1	1	1	5	5	0	4	Elite round
3	Cyprus (H)	3	1	0	2	4	5	−1	3	
4	Moldova	3	0	1	2	1	6	−5	1	

(H) Hosts
25 September 2013
14:30

Norway	4–2	Cyprus
Svendsen 44' (pen.); Lorentzen 49', 80+1'; Berg Gjerstrøm 57'	Report	Christodoulou 15' (pen.), 67'

Kouklia Community Stadium, Paphos
Referee: Andris Treimanis (Latvia)
25 September 2013
14:30

Spain	3–0	Moldova
Villalibre 11'; Canós 14'; Altamirano 23'	Report

Pafiako Stadium, Paphos
Referee: Sergey Tsinkevich (Belarus)

27 September 2013
14:30

Norway	1–1	Moldova
Lorentzen 16'	Report	Cebotari 20'

Pafiako Stadium, Paphos
Referee: Vladimír Vnuk (Slovakia)
27 September 2013
14:30

Cyprus	0–1	Spain
	Report	Meré 68'

Kouklia Community Stadium, Paphos
Referee: Andris Treimanis (Latvia)

30 September 2013
14:30

Spain	2–0	Norway
Villalibre 53'; Canós 65'	Report

Pafiako Stadium, Paphos
Referee: Vladimír Vnuk (Slovakia)
30 September 2013
14:30

Moldova	0–2	Cyprus
	Report	Fragkou 17'; Christodoulou 23'

Kouklia Community Stadium, Paphos
Referee: Sergey Tsinkevich (Belarus)

=== Group 9 ===
Pos	Team	Pld	W	D	L	GF	GA	GD	Pts	Qualification
1	Turkey	3	2	1	0	5	2	+3	7	Elite round
2	Latvia	3	2	0	1	3	1	+2	6	Elite round
3	Northern Ireland (H)	3	1	0	2	3	4	−1	3	
4	Luxembourg	3	0	1	2	3	7	−4	1	

(H) Hosts
14 November 2013
15:00

Turkey	2–2	Luxembourg
Alıcı 16'; E. Ünal 44'	Report	Sousa 9'; Flies 15' (pen.)

Shamrock Park, Portadown
Attendance: 47
Referee: Petur Reinert (Faroe Islands)
14 November 2013
20:00

Northern Ireland	0–1	Latvia
	Report	Juhnevičs 27'

Stangmore Park, Dungannon
Attendance: 300
Referee: Anatolii Zhabchenko (Ukraine)

16 November 2013
15:00

Latvia	0–1	Turkey
	Report	E. Ünal 74'

Solitude, Belfast
Attendance: 54
Referee: Anatoli Zhabchenko (Ukraine)
16 November 2013
20:00

Northern Ireland	3–1	Luxembourg
Salley 1'; Thompson 32'; Mooney 80+4'	Report	Sousa 57'

Solitude, Belfast
Attendance: 524
Referee: Dennis Antamo (Finland)

19 November 2013
15:00

Turkey	2–0	Northern Ireland
E. Ünal 53'; Alıcı 66'	Report

Stangmore Park, Dungannon
Attendance: 105
Referee: Dennis Antamo (Finland)
19 November 2013
15:00

Luxembourg	0–2	Latvia
	Report	Vavilovs 48'; Gulbis 57'

Shamrock Park, Portadown
Attendance: 30
Referee: Petur Reinert (Faroe Islands)

=== Group 10 ===
Pos	Team	Pld	W	D	L	GF	GA	GD	Pts	Qualification
1	Iceland	3	2	1	0	9	6	+3	7	Elite round
2	Russia (H)	3	2	0	1	4	3	+1	6	Elite round
3	Slovakia	3	1	0	2	7	8	−1	3	
4	Azerbaijan	3	0	1	2	5	8	−3	1	

(H) Hosts
21 September 2013
11:00

Iceland	3–3	Azerbaijan
Einarsson 20'; Sigthorsson 62'; Bjarnason 72'	Report	Kama 11'; Jafarov 50'; Jabrailov 68' (pen.)

Olimpia Stadium, Volgograd
Attendance: 550
Referee: Dejan Jakimovski (Macedonia)
21 September 2013
15:00

Russia	2–1	Slovakia
Pronichev 22'; Yevtushenko 80+4'	Report	Špalek 76'

Olimpia Stadium, Volgograd
Attendance: 2,760
Referee: Georgi Kabakov (Bulgaria)

23 September 2013
11:00

Slovakia	2–4	Iceland
Gorelčík 24'; Krč 40+3'	Report	Einarsson 15'; Larusson 55', 79'; Guðmundsson 61'

Olimpia Stadium, Volgograd
Attendance: 150
Referee: Dejan Jakimovski (Macedonia)
23 September 2013
15:00

Russia	1–0	Azerbaijan
Obolski 6'	Report

Olimpia Stadium, Volgograd
Attendance: 1,250
Referee: Michael Tykgaard (Denmark)

26 September 2013
15:00

Iceland	2–1	Russia
Gunnarsson 31'; Guðmundsson 50'	Report	Yamschikov 35'

Olimpia Stadium, Volgograd
Attendance: 2,150
Referee: Georgi Kabakov (Bulgaria)
26 September 2013
15:00

Azerbaijan	2–4	Slovakia
Kama 62' (pen.); Akmurzaev 69'	Report	Gorelčík 10'; Krč 25'; Špalek 68' (pen.); Kondrlík 78'

Zenit Stadium, Volgograd
Attendance: 170
Referee: Michael Tykgaard (Denmark)

=== Group 11 ===
Pos	Team	Pld	W	D	L	GF	GA	GD	Pts	Qualification
1	Netherlands	3	3	0	0	17	0	+17	9	Elite round
2	Georgia (H)	3	2	0	1	5	2	+3	6	Elite round
3	Faroe Islands	3	1	0	2	1	6	−5	3	
4	San Marino	3	0	0	3	1	16	−15	0	

(H) Hosts
17 October 2013
14:00

Netherlands	4–0	Faroe Islands
Slabbekoorn 32'; Verloo 40'; Owobowale 46'; Nouri 54'	Report

Boris Paichadze National Stadium, Tbilisi
Attendance: 107
Referee: Alexander Harkam (Austria)
17 October 2013
16:00

Georgia	3–1	San Marino
Beridze 8'; Mamuchashvili 19'; Lashkhia 33'	Report	Tamagnini 67'

Mikheil Meskhi Stadium, Tbilisi
Attendance: 800
Referee: Ioannis Anastasiou (Cyprus)

19 October 2013
12:00

San Marino	0–12	Netherlands
	Report	Bergwijn 9' van der Moot 23', 59', 71'; Nouri 25'; Slabbekoorn 33'; Walian 52', 64', 66', 68', 76'; Owobowale 78'

Tsentraluri, Gori
Attendance: 800
Referee: Ioannis Anastasiou (Cyprus)
19 October 2013
14:00

Georgia	2–0	Faroe Islands
Mikeltadze 15'; Jobava 80+5'	Report

Mikheil Meskhi Stadium, Tbilisi
Attendance: 400
Referee: Elmir Pilav (Bosnia and Herzegovina)

22 October 2013
13:30

Netherlands	1–0	Georgia
Slabbekoorn 26'	Report

Mikheil Meskhi Stadium, Tbilisi
Attendance: 600
Referee: Alexander Harkam (Austria)
22 October 2013
13:30

Faroe Islands	1–0	San Marino
Olsen 76'	Report

Tsentraluri, Gori
Attendance: 250
Referee: Elmir Pilav (Bosnia and Herzegovina)

=== Group 12 ===
Pos	Team	Pld	W	D	L	GF	GA	GD	Pts	Qualification
1	Switzerland	3	2	1	0	7	0	+7	7	Elite round
2	Austria	3	2	0	1	4	4	0	6	Elite round
3	Denmark (H)	3	1	1	1	1	2	−1	4	
4	Kazakhstan	3	0	0	3	0	6	−6	0	

(H) Hosts
26 September 2013
16:30

Denmark	1–0	Kazakhstan
Rasmussen 35' (pen.)	Report

Varde Idrætspark, Varde
Referee: Mitja Žganec (Slovenia)
26 September 2013
19:00

Switzerland	4–0	Austria
Ajeti 10', 80+2'; Alves 31'; Cani 40'	Report

Sport og Event Park Esbjerg, Esbjerg
Referee: Mete Kalkavan (Turkey)

28 September 2013
13:00

Kazakhstan	0–3	Switzerland
	Report	Ajeti 26', 51' (pen.); Alves 66'

Varde Idrætspark, Varde
Referee: Mete Kalkavan (Turkey)
28 September 2013
18:00

Denmark	0–2	Austria
	Report	Yılmaz 7', 65'

Haderslev, Haderslev
Referee: Robert Rogers (Republic of Ireland)

1 October 2013
15:00

Switzerland	0–0	Denmark
	Report

Varde Idrætspark, Varde
Referee: Mitja Žganec (Slovenia)
1 October 2013
15:00

Austria	2–0	Kazakhstan
Gugganig 28'; Yılmaz 40+1'	Report

Haderslev, Haderslev
Referee: Robert Rogers (Republic of Ireland)

=== Group 13 ===
Pos	Team	Pld	W	D	L	GF	GA	GD	Pts	Qualification
1	Poland	3	3	0	0	8	2	+6	9	Elite round
2	Belgium	3	2	0	1	7	2	+5	6	Elite round
3	Macedonia (H)	3	1	0	2	4	9	−5	3	
4	Bulgaria	3	0	0	3	1	7	−6	0	

(H) Hosts
17 October 2013
14:00

Belgium	2–0	Bulgaria
Verreth 2'; Dimata 69'	Report

Boris Trajkovski, Skopje
Referee: Ádám Németh (Hungary)
17 October 2013
14:00

Poland	3–2	Macedonia
Kozak 50'; Siemaszko 73', 76'	Report	Georgiev 19'; Krstevski 43'

FFM Training Centre, Skopje
Referee: Tore Hansen (Norway)

19 October 2013
14:00

Belgium	5–0	Macedonia
Weymans 20'; Bocevski 26' (o.g.); Verkindere 43'; Verreth 48'; Callebaut 54'	Report

Boris Trajkovski, Skopje
Referee: Mikhail Vilkov (Russia)
19 October 2013
14:00

Bulgaria	0–3	Poland
	Report	Jagiełło 60'; Siemaszko 72'; Skrzecz 74'

FFM Training Centre, Skopje
Referee: Ádám Németh (Hungary)

22 October 2013
14:00

Poland	2–0	Belgium
Vershueren 25' (o.g.); Ryczkowski 55'	Report

Boris Trajkovski, Skopje
Referee: Tore Hansen (Norway)
22 October 2013
14:00

Macedonia	2–1	Bulgaria
Jevtoski 38'; Petkovski 54'	Report	Maksimov 77'

FFM Training Centre, Skopje
Referee: Mikhail Vilkov (Russia)

== Ranking of third-placed teams ==
To determine the best third-ranked team from the qualifying round, only the results of the third-placed team against the winners and runners-up in each group are taken into account.

Pos	Grp	Team	Pld	W	D	L	GF	GA	GD	Pts	Qualification
1	2	Ukraine	2	0	1	1	1	2	−1	1	Elite round
2	3	Israel	2	0	1	1	4	6	−2	1	
3	12	Denmark	2	0	1	1	0	2	−2	1	
4	10	Slovakia	2	0	0	2	3	6	−3	0	
5	8	Cyprus	2	0	0	2	2	5	−3	0	
6	1	Belarus	2	0	0	2	1	4	−3	0	
7	5	Croatia	2	0	0	2	0	3	−3	0	
8	9	Northern Ireland	2	0	0	2	0	3	−3	0	
9	6	Estonia	2	0	0	2	2	7	−5	0	
10	4	Slovenia	2	0	0	2	1	6	−5	0	
11	13	Macedonia	2	0	0	2	2	8	−6	0	
12	7	Armenia	2	0	0	2	0	6	−6	0	
13	11	Faroe Islands	2	0	0	2	0	6	−6	0	
