= 2014 UEFA European Under-17 Championship elite round =

Football tournament qualifying

The 2014 UEFA European Under-17 Championship elite round was the second round of qualification for the final tournament of the 2014 UEFA European Under-17 Championship in Malta. The 27 teams advancing from the qualifying round plus Germany, who received a bye to the elite round, were drawn into seven groups of four teams, where they played each other in a single round-robin mini-tournament hosted by one of the group's teams. The seven group winners qualified for the final tournament.

As the team with the highest UEFA under-17 coefficient, Germany were given a bye to this round. The draw for the elite round was held on 28 November 2013 and matches took place between 20 and 31 March 2014.

== Seeding ==
The draw for the elite round was held at the UEFA headquarters in Nyon, on 28 November 2013. Each team was placed in one of four drawing pots, according to their qualifying round results. The seven sides with the best records were seeded in Pot A, and this continued down to Pot D, which contained the seven teams with the weakest records. During the draw, each group was filled with one team from every pot, taking into account that teams that played each other in the first qualifying round could not be drawn into the same group again.

Pot A	Pot B	Pot C	Pot D
Germany; England; Netherlands; Poland; Spain; Portugal; Romania	Serbia; Switzerland; France; Italy; Iceland; Scotland; Turkey	Greece; Belgium; Georgia; Czech Republic; Latvia; Russia; Austria	Republic of Ireland; Wales; Norway; Sweden; Bosnia and Herzegovina; Albania; Ukraine

== Tiebreakers ==
If two or more teams are equal on points on completion of the group matches, the following criteria are applied to determine the rankings.

1. Higher number of points obtained in the group matches played among the teams in question
2. Superior goal difference from the group matches played among the teams in question
3. Higher number of goals scored in the group matches played among the teams in question
4. If, after applying criteria 1) to 3) to several teams, two teams still have an equal ranking, the criteria 1) to 3) will be reapplied to determine the ranking of these teams. If this procedure does not lead to a decision, criteria 5) and 6) will apply
5. Results of all group matches:
  1. Superior goal difference
  2. Higher number of goals scored
6. Drawing of lots

Additionally, if two teams which have the same number of points and the same number of goals scored and conceded play their last group match against each other and are still equal at the end of that match, their final rankings are determined by the penalty shoot-out and not by the criteria listed above. This procedure is applicable only if a ranking of the teams is required to determine the group winner.

== Groups ==
The hosts of the seven mini-tournament groups are indicated below.

All times are CET (UTC+01:00) until 29 March 2014 and CEST (UTC+02:00) starting from 30 March 2014.

=== Group 1 ===
Pos	Team	Pld	W	D	L	GF	GA	GD	Pts	Qualification
1	Switzerland	3	2	1	0	3	1	+2	7	Final tournament
2	Russia (H)	3	1	2	0	4	2	+2	5	
3	Spain	3	1	1	1	2	2	0	4	
4	Wales	3	0	0	3	0	4	−4	0	

(H) Hosts
26 March 2014
12:00

Switzerland	1–0	Wales
Babic 77'	Report

Rubin Stadium, Kazan
Referee: Fran Jović (Croatia)
26 March 2014
16:00

Spain	1–1	Russia
Antonio 40'	Report	Kipiani 50'

Rubin Stadium, Kazan
Referee: Benoît Millot (France)

28 March 2014
12:00

Spain	1–0	Wales
Meré 71'	Report

Rubin Stadium, Kazan
Referee: Jens Maae (Denmark)
28 March 2014
16:00

Russia	1–1	Switzerland
Yamschikov 62'	Report	Ajeti 80+2'

Rubin Stadium, Kazan
Referee: Fran Jović (Croatia)

31 March 2014
16:00

Switzerland	1–0	Spain
Alpsoy 75'	Report

Trudovye Rezervy Stadium, Kazan
Referee: Benoît Millot (France)
31 March 2014
16:00

Wales	0–2	Russia
	Report	Pronichev 4' (pen.); Melkadze 80+3'

Rubin Stadium, Kazan
Referee: Jens Maae (Denmark)

=== Group 2 ===
Pos	Team	Pld	W	D	L	GF	GA	GD	Pts	Qualification
1	Turkey	3	2	1	0	4	2	+2	7	Final tournament
2	Poland	3	2	1	0	4	2	+2	7	
3	Greece (H)	3	1	0	2	4	3	+1	3	
4	Norway	3	0	0	3	3	8	−5	0	

(H) Hosts
25 March 2014
13:00

Poland	2–1	Greece
Kownacki 26', 49'	Report	Xiros 63'

Kostas Davourlis Stadium, Patras
Referee: Denis Scherbakov (Belarus)
25 March 2014
15:00

Turkey	3–2	Norway
Enes Ünal 27', 46'; Doğuş Can 63'	Report	Svendsen 7'; Lorentzen 29'

Pampeloponnisiako Stadium, Patras
Referee: Manuel Schüttengruber (Austria)

27 March 2014
13:00

Poland	2–1	Norway
Ryczkowski 33'; Kownacki 67'	Report	Lorentzen 65'

Pampeloponnisiako Stadium, Patras
Referee: Manuel Schüttengruber (Austria)
27 March 2014
15:00

Greece	0–1	Turkey
	Report	Enes Ünal 60'

Kostas Davourlis Stadium, Patras
Referee: Bastian Dankert (Germany)

30 March 2014
15:00

Turkey	0–0	Poland
	Report
Penalties
Aydoğan (penalty missed); Karakoç (penalty scored); Ersoy (penalty scored); Bekaroğlu (penalty scored); Enes Ünal (penalty scored); Özfesli (penalty scored)	5 – 4	(penalty scored) Wieteska; (penalty scored) Jagiełło; (penalty scored) Drągowski; (penalty missed) Borecki; (penalty scored) Kownacki; (penalty missed) Skrzecz

Pampeloponnisiako Stadium, Patras
Referee: Bastian Dankert (Germany)
30 March 2014
15:00

Norway	0–3	Greece
	Report	Manthatis 16', 60'; Angelopoulos 31' (pen.)

Kostas Davourlis Stadium, Patras
Referee: Denis Scherbakov (Belarus)

=== Group 3 ===
Pos	Team	Pld	W	D	L	GF	GA	GD	Pts	Qualification
1	Netherlands (H)	3	3	0	0	7	2	+5	9	Final tournament
2	France	3	2	0	1	6	4	+2	6	
3	Austria	3	1	0	2	3	4	−1	3	
4	Sweden	3	0	0	3	0	6	−6	0	

(H) Hosts
20 March 2014
16:00

France	3–0	Sweden
Saint-Maximin 3'; Gelin 13'; Michelin 49'	Report

Sportpark Oude Landen, Nuenen
Referee: Paul Mclaughlin (Ireland)
20 March 2014
19:00

Netherlands	2–1	Austria
Berenstein 71', 80+3'	Report	Prokop 66'

Sportpark Parkzicht, Uden
Referee: Bartosz Frankowski (Poland)

22 March 2014
14:00

Austria	1–2	France
Posch 33' (pen.)	Report	Dembele 75', 80+1'

Sportpark Parkzicht, Uden
Referee: Marco Guida (Italy)
22 March 2014
17:00

Netherlands	2–0	Sweden
Slabbekoorn 28'; Bergwijn 56'	Report

Sportpark Oude Landen, Nuenen
Referee: Bartosz Frankowski (Poland)

25 March 2014
19:00

France	1–3	Netherlands
Thuram 58'	Report	van de Beek 42'; Bergwijn 45', 60'

Sportpark Parkzicht, Uden
Referee: Bartosz Frankowski (Poland)
25 March 2014
19:00

Sweden	0–1	Austria
	Report	Peric 56'

Sportpark Oude Landen, Nuenen
Referee: Paul Mclaughlin (Ireland)

=== Group 4 ===
Pos	Team	Pld	W	D	L	GF	GA	GD	Pts	Qualification
1	England	3	3	0	0	4	1	+3	9	Final tournament
2	Czech Republic (H)	3	2	0	1	4	2	+2	6	
3	Italy	3	1	0	2	4	5	−1	3	
4	Albania	3	0	0	3	1	5	−4	0	

(H) Hosts
26 March 2014
14:00

Italy	2–1	Albania
Felicioli 28' de Santis 61' (pen.)	Report	Bare 14'

Letná Stadion, Zlín
Referee: Bojan Pandžić (Sweden)
26 March 2014
17:00

England	1–0	Czech Republic
Solanke 53'	Report

Městský fotbalový stadion Miroslava Valenty, Uherské Hradiště
Referee: Edin Jakupović (Bosnia and Herzegovina)

28 March 2014
14:00

England	1–0	Albania
Brown 49'	Report

Městský fotbalový stadion Miroslava Valenty, Uherské Hradiště
Referee: Bojan Pandžić (Sweden)
28 March 2014
17:00

Czech Republic	2–1	Italy
Klíma 78'; Černý 80+1'	Report	Bonazzoli 27'

Letná Stadion, Zlín
Referee: Alejandro Hernandez (Spain)

31 March 2014
17:00

Italy	1–2	England
Trani 54'	Report	Armstrong 20'; Solanke 72'

Letná Stadion, Zlín
Referee: Alejandro Hernandez (Spain)
31 March 2014
17:00

Albania	0–2	Czech Republic
	Report	Černý 10'; Macek 40'

Městský fotbalový stadion Miroslava Valenty, Uherské Hradiště
Referee: Edin Jakupović (Bosnia and Herzegovina)

=== Group 5 ===
Pos	Team	Pld	W	D	L	GF	GA	GD	Pts	Qualification
1	Germany	3	2	1	0	8	1	+7	7	Final tournament
2	Serbia (H)	3	2	1	0	5	2	+3	7	
3	Republic of Ireland	3	0	1	2	3	7	−4	1	
4	Georgia	3	0	1	2	2	8	−6	1	

(H) Hosts
26 March 2014
15:00

Germany	4–0	Georgia
Ochs 4', 58'; Fiore-Tapia 78'; Henrichs 80'	Report

Sportski centar Suvača, Pećinci
Referee: Bart Vertenten (Belgium)
26 March 2014
15:00

Serbia	2–1	Republic of Ireland
Šaponjić 7'; Jović 80+3' (pen.)	Report	Duggan 67'

Sportski centar Kuća Fudbala, Stara Pazova
Referee: Alexandru Tean (Moldova)

28 March 2014
15:00

Germany	3–0	Republic of Ireland
Besuschkow 1'; Ferati 9'; Ochs 52'	Report

Obilić Stadium, Belgrade
Referee: Zbynek Proske (Czech Republic)
28 March 2014
15:00

Georgia	0–2	Serbia
	Report	Šaponjić 64'; Karišić 69'

Sportski centar Kuća Fudbala, Stara Pazova
Referee: Bart Vertenten (Belgium)

31 March 2014
14:00

Republic of Ireland	2–2	Georgia
Tvaradze 23' (o.g.); McDonnell 75'	Report	Kiknadze 77'; Kamladze 80+2'

Obilić Stadium, Belgrade
Referee: Alexandru Tean (Moldova)
31 March 2014
15:00

Serbia	1–1	Germany
Šaponjić 13'	Report	Aydogan 62'

Karađorđe Stadium, Novi Sad
Referee: Zbynek Proske (Czech Republic)

=== Group 6 ===
Pos	Team	Pld	W	D	L	GF	GA	GD	Pts	Qualification
1	Scotland (H)	3	3	0	0	6	1	+5	9	Final tournament
2	Bosnia and Herzegovina	3	2	0	1	4	2	+2	6	
3	Romania	3	0	1	2	0	2	−2	1	
4	Belgium	3	0	1	2	1	6	−5	1	

(H) Hosts
24 March 2014
13:00

Romania	0–0	Belgium
	Report

Cappielow Park, Greenock
Referee: Sergei Ivanov (Russia)
24 March 2014
19:00

Scotland	2–0	Bosnia and Herzegovina
Lang 21'; Wighton 52' (pen.)	Report

Rugby Park, Kilmarnock
Referee: Tvetan Krastev (Bulgaria)

26 March 2014
13:00

Romania	0–1	Bosnia and Herzegovina
	Report	Gojak 55'

Somerset Park, Ayr
Referee: Ville Nevalainen (Finland)
26 March 2014
19:00

Belgium	1–3	Scotland
Damraoui 28'	Report	Nesbitt 44'; Ballantye 52'; Sheppard 64'

Cappielow Park, Greenock
Referee: Tvetan Krastev (Bulgaria)

29 March 2014
16:00

Scotland	1–0	Romania
Wright 2'	Report

Rugby Park, Kilmarnock
Referee: Sergei Ivanov (Russia)
29 March 2014
16:00

Bosnia and Herzegovina	3–0	Belgium
Gojak 6', 69'; Kremenović 56'	Report

Cappielow Park, Greenock
Referee: Ville Nevalainen (Finland)

=== Group 7 ===
Pos	Team	Pld	W	D	L	GF	GA	GD	Pts
1	Portugal (H)	3	3	0	0	9	0	+9	9
2	Ukraine	3	2	0	1	7	4	+3	6
3	Iceland	3	0	1	2	0	5	−5	1
4	Latvia	3	0	1	2	1	8	−7	1

(H) Hosts
26 March 2014
15:00

Iceland	0–2	Ukraine
	Report	Hutsulyak 40+2'; Taranukha 43'

Estádio Municipal de Tábua, Tábua
Attendance: 150
Referee: Zaven Hovhannisyan (Armenia)
26 March 2014
16:30

Portugal	3–0	Latvia
Gonçalves 9'; Rodrigues 39'; Sanches 41'	Report

Estádio Municipal Sérgio Conceição, Coimbra
Attendance: 350
Referee: Sascha Amhof (Switzerland)

28 March 2014
15:00

Latvia	0–0	Iceland
	Report

Complexo Desportivo da Tocha, Tocha
Attendance: 50
Referee: Zaven Hovhannisyan (Armenia)
28 March 2014
16:30

Portugal	3–0	Ukraine
Silva 39'; Buta 57'; Neves 76'	Report

Centro de Treinos, Luso
Attendance: 600
Referee: Roi Reinshreiber (Israel)

31 March 2014
17:00

Iceland	0–3	Portugal
	Report	Rodrigues 20'; Neves 64'; Neto 67'

Estádio Municipal Sérgio Conceição, Coimbra
Attendance: 150
Referee: Roi Reinshreiber (Israel)
31 March 2014
17:00

Ukraine	5–1	Latvia
Bērziņš 7' (o.g.); Mykhaylychenko 30'; Schcebetun 48'; Sautin 70', 76'	Report	Tumanovs 74'

Estádio Carlos Duarte, Pampilhosa
Attendance: 50
Referee: Sascha Amhof (Switzerland)

== Qualified teams ==
Country	Qualified as	Previous appearances in tournament^{1}
Malta	Hosts	**0** (debut)
Switzerland	Group 1 winner	**6** (**2002**, 2005, 2008, 2009, 2010, 2013)
Turkey	Group 2 winner	**5** (2004, **2005**, 2008, 2009, 2010)
Netherlands	Group 3 winner	**7** (2002, 2005, 2007, 2008, 2009, **2011**, **2012**)
England	Group 4 winner	**8** (2002, 2003, 2004, 2005, 2007, 2009, **2010**, 2011)
Germany	Group 5 winner	**5** (2006, 2007, **2009**, 2011, 2012)
Scotland	Group 6 winner	**1** (2008)
Portugal	Group 7 winner	**4** (2002, **2003**, 2004, 2010)

^{1} Only counted appearances for under-17 era (bold indicates champion for that year, while italic indicates hosts)
