= 2014 UEFA European Under-17 Championship =

UEFA Kampjonat Ewropew ta’ taħt is-17-il sena 2014
- The official logo of the tournament

Tournament details
- Host country: Malta
- Dates: 9–21 May
- Teams: 53 (qualification); 8 (finals)
- Venue: 3 (in 3 host cities)

Final positions
- Champions: England (2nd title)
- Runners-up: Netherlands

Tournament statistics
- Matches played: 15
- Goals scored: 46 (3.07 per match)
- Attendance: 42,388 (2,826 per match)
- Top scorer(s): (England) Dominic Solanke (Netherlands) Jari Schuurman (4 goals)
- Best player: (Netherlands) Steven Bergwijn

The 2014 UEFA European Under-17 Championship was the 13th edition of the UEFA European Under-17 Championship, an annual football competition between men's under-17 national teams organised by UEFA. The final tournament was hosted for the first time in Malta, from 9 to 21 May 2014, after their bid was selected by the UEFA Executive Committee on 20 March 2012 in Istanbul, Turkey.

Fifty-three teams participated in a two-round qualification stage, taking place between September 2013 and March 2014, to determine the seven teams joining the hosts. Players born after 1 January 1997 were eligible to participate in this competition. This edition marked the first appearance of a national team from Gibraltar, and was the first UEFA competition allowing referees to use a vanishing spray when setting free kicks. Live broadcast was provided by Eurosport 2 and Eurosport International.

England beat the Netherlands in the final on penalties to secure their second European under-17 title, four years after their first, and the second to be won by coach John Peacock. The 2013 champions, Russia, failed to qualify for the final tournament.

== Qualification ==
Qualification for the final tournament of the 2014 UEFA European Under-17 Championship consisted of two rounds: a qualifying round and an elite round. In the qualifying round, 53 national teams competed in 13 groups of four teams, with each group winner and runner-up, plus the best third-placed team, advancing to the elite round. There, the 27 first-round qualifiers plus Germany, who was given a bye, were distributed in seven groups of four teams. The winner of each group qualified for the final tournament.

=== Qualified teams ===
Country	Qualified as	Previous appearances in tournament^{1}
Malta	Hosts	**0** (debut)
Switzerland	Group 1 winner	**6** (**2002**, 2005, 2008, 2009, 2010, 2013)
Turkey	Group 2 winner	**5** (2004, **2005**, 2008, 2009, 2010)
Netherlands	Group 3 winner	**7** (2002, 2005, 2007, 2008, 2009, **2011**, **2012**)
England	Group 4 winner	**8** (2002, 2003, 2004, 2005, 2007, 2009, **2010**, 2011)
Germany	Group 5 winner	**6** (2002, 2006, 2007, **2009**, 2011, 2012)
Scotland	Group 6 winner	**1** (2008)
Portugal	Group 7 winner	**4** (2002, **2003**, 2004, 2010)

^{1} Only counted appearances for under-17 era (bold indicates champion for that year, while italic indicates hosts)

=== Final draw ===
The draw for the group stage of the final tournament was held on 9 April 2014 at Saint James Cavalier in Valletta. It was conducted by UEFA's Youth and Amateur Football Committee chairman Jim Boyce, along with Fr. Hilary Tagliaferro and former Maltese international David Carabott. The host team, Malta, was automatically assigned as team one in group A, while the remaining teams were drawn successively in the order B1, A2, B2, A3, B3, A4 and B4.

== Venues ==
2014 UEFA European Under-17 Championship is located in Malta	Ta' Qali	Paola	Xewkija
2014 UEFA European Under-17 Championship is located in Malta	Ta' Qali National Stadium	Tony Bezzina Stadium	Gozo Stadium
2014 UEFA European Under-17 Championship is located in Malta	Capacity: 16,997	Capacity: 2,968	Capacity: 1,644

== Match officials ==
Referees

- Nikola Dabanović (Montenegro)
- Alexander Harkam (Austria)
- Andreas Ekberg (Sweden)
- Aleksandrs Anufrijevs (Latvia)
- Jonathan Lardot (Belgium)
- Aliyar Aghayev (Azerbaijan)

Assistant referees

- István Albert (Hungary)
- Audrius Jagintavičius (Lithuania)
- Dag-Roger Nebben (Norway)
- Mesrop Ghazaryan (Armenia)
- David Elias Biton (Israel)
- Oleksandr Korniyko (Ukraine)
- Jure Praprotnik (Slovenia)
- (Georgia (country)) David Chigogidze (Georgia)

Fourth officials

- Clayton Pisani (Malta)
- Alan Mario Sant (Malta)

== Group stage ==
Map of the 2014 UEFA European Under-17 Championship finalist teams and their performances. The inset shows Malta (host).

Fixtures and match schedule were confirmed by UEFA on 15 April 2014.

Tie-breaking

If two or more teams were equal on points on completion of the group matches, the following tie-breaking criteria were applied:

1. Higher number of points obtained in the matches played between the teams in question;
2. Superior goal difference resulting from the matches played between the teams in question;
3. Higher number of goals scored in the matches played between the teams in question;

If, after having applied criteria 1 to 3, teams still have an equal ranking, criteria 1 to 3 are reapplied exclusively to the matches between the teams in question to determine their final rankings. If this procedure does not lead to a decision, criteria 4 to 7 apply.

4. Superior goal difference in all group matches;
5. Higher number of goals scored in all group matches;
6. Respect Fair play ranking of the teams in question (final tournament);
7. Drawing of lots.

If only two teams are tied (according to criteria 1–7) after having met in the last match of the group stage, their ranking is determined by a penalty shoot-out.

All times are in Central European Summer Time (UTC+02:00).

=== Group A ===
Pos	Team	Pld	W	D	L	GF	GA	GD	Pts	Qualification
1	Netherlands	3	3	0	0	10	4	+6	9	Knockout stage
2	England	3	2	0	1	7	3	+4	6	Knockout stage
3	Turkey	3	1	0	2	7	7	0	3	
4	Malta (H)	3	0	0	3	2	12	−10	0	

(H) Hosts
9 May 2014
11:00

Netherlands	3–2	Turkey
Verdonk 54' (pen.); Nouri 69'; Ould-Chikh 75'	Report	Ünal 43'; Aktay 79'

Ta' Qali National Stadium, Attard
Attendance: 3,947
Referee: Nikola Dabanović (Montenegro)
9 May 2014
18:00

Malta	0–3	England
	Report	Roberts 15', 48'; Armstrong 25'

Ta' Qali National Stadium, Attard
Attendance: 7,015
Referee: Aleksandrs Anufrijevs (Latvia)

12 May 2014
11:15

England	4–1	Turkey
Solanke 22', 49'; Kenny 58'; Armstrong 64'	Report	Ünal 16'

Gozo Stadium, Xewkija
Attendance: 1,631
Referee: Jonathan Lardot (Belgium)
12 May 2014
15:15

Malta	2–5	Netherlands
Mbong 37'; Friggieri 64'	Report	Schuurman 5', 27', 42'; Bergwijn 13', 69'

Gozo Stadium, Xewkija
Attendance: 1,145
Referee: Aliyar Aghayev (Azerbaijan)

15 May 2014
11:00

Turkey	4–0	Malta
Alici 43', 58'; Aktay 70', 76'	Report

Ta' Qali National Stadium, Attard
Attendance: 8,129
Referee: Jonathan Lardot (Belgium)
15 May 2014
11:00

England	0–2	Netherlands
	Report	Verdonk 45' van der Moot 68'

Hibernians Ground, Paola
Attendance: 1,240
Referee: Alexander Harkam (Austria)

=== Group B ===
Pos	Team	Pld	W	D	L	GF	GA	GD	Pts	Qualification
1	Portugal	3	3	0	0	4	0	+4	9	Knockout stage
2	Scotland	3	2	0	1	4	3	+1	6	Knockout stage
3	Germany	3	0	1	2	1	3	−2	1	
4	Switzerland	3	0	1	2	2	5	−3	1	

9 May 2014
11:15

Germany	1–1	Switzerland
Henrichs 58'	Report	Babic 72'

Gozo Stadium, Xewkija
Attendance: 1,448
Referee: Alexander Harkam (Austria)
9 May 2014
15:15

Scotland	0–2	Portugal
	Report	Sanches 18'; Mata 78'

Gozo Stadium, Xewkija
Attendance: 341
Referee: Andreas Ekberg (Sweden)

12 May 2014
11:00

Switzerland	0–1	Portugal
	Report	Mata 54'

Hibernians Ground, Paola
Attendance: 2,563
Referee: Nikola Dabanović (Montenegro)
12 May 2014
18:00

Germany	0–1	Scotland
	Report	Wright 41'

Hibernians Ground, Paola
Attendance: 1,206
Referee: Aleksandrs Anufrijevs (Latvia)

15 May 2014
18:00

Portugal	1–0	Germany
P. Rodrigues 51'	Report

Ta' Qali National Stadium, Attard
Attendance: 1,172
Referee: Andreas Ekberg (Sweden)
15 May 2014
18:00

Switzerland	1–3	Scotland
Oberlin 20'	Report	Wighton 45'; Sheppard 56'; Hardie 63'

Hibernians Ground, Paola
Attendance: 514
Referee: Aliyar Aghayev (Azerbaijan)

== Knockout stage ==
In the knockout stage, penalty shoot-out is used to decide the winner if necessary (no extra time is played).

=== Bracket ===
Semi-finals
18 May – Attard
Netherlands	5
Scotland	0
18 May – Attard
Portugal	0
England	2

Final
21 May – Attard
Netherlands	1 (1)
England (p)	1 (4)

=== Semi-finals ===
18 May 2014
17:45

Portugal	0–2	England
	Report	Solanke 52'; Roberts 74'

Ta' Qali National Stadium, Attard
Attendance: 2,107
Referee: Alexander Harkam (Austria)

18 May 2014
20:45

Netherlands	5–0	Scotland
Verdonk 35' (pen.); Nouri 38'; Bergwijn 57'; Owobowale 59'; Van der Moot 73'	Report

Ta' Qali National Stadium, Attard
Attendance: 508
Referee: Jonathan Lardot (Belgium)

=== Final ===
21 May 2014
19:00

Netherlands	1–1	England
Schuurman 40'	Report	Solanke 25'
Penalties
Van der Moot (penalty missed); Schuurman (penalty scored); Verdonk (penalty missed)	1–4	(penalty scored) Ledson; (penalty scored) Moore; (penalty scored) Cooke; (penalty scored) Kenny

Ta' Qali National Stadium, Attard
Attendance: 9,422
Referee: Andreas Ekberg (Sweden)

== Team of the Tournament ==
Goalkeepers

- (Netherlands) Yanick van Osch
- (Switzerland) Gregor Kobel

Defenders

- (England) Jonjoe Kenny
- (England) Tafari Moore
- (England) Joe Gomez
- (Netherlands) Calvin Verdonk
- (Portugal) Ferro
- (Germany) Lukas Boeder

Midfielders

- (England) Ryan Ledson
- (Scotland) Aidan Nesbitt
- (Netherlands) Jari Schuurman
- (Portugal) Rúben Neves
- (Portugal) Renato Sanches
- (Switzerland) Dimitri Oberlin

Forwards

- (Netherlands) Steven Bergwijn
- (Turkey) Enes Ünal
- (England) Patrick Roberts
- (Portugal) Alexandre Silva

== Goalscorers ==
4 goals

- (England) Dominic Solanke
- (Netherlands) Jari Schuurman

3 goals

- (England) Patrick Roberts
- (Netherlands) Calvin Verdonk
- (Netherlands) Steven Bergwijn
- (Turkey) Fatih Aktay

2 goals

- (England) Adam Armstrong
- (Netherlands) Abdelhak Nouri
- (Netherlands) Dani van der Moot
- (Portugal) Luís Mata
- (Turkey) Enes Ünal

1 goal

- (England) Jonjoe Kenny
- (Germany) Benjamin Henrichs
- (Malta) Aidan Friggieri
- (Malta) Joseph Mbong
- (Netherlands) Bilal Ould-Chikh
- (Netherlands) Segun Owobowale
- (Portugal) Pedro Rodrigues
- (Portugal) Renato Sanches
- (Scotland) Ryan Hardie
- (Scotland) Jake Sheppard
- (Scotland) Craig Wighton
- (Scotland) Scott Wright
- (Switzerland) Boris Babic
- (Switzerland) Dimitri Oberlin
- (Turkey) Hayrullah Alici
