= Croatia at the 2014 FIFA World Cup =

Croatia participated in the 2014 FIFA World Cup. This was their fourth appearance having missed out on 2010.

== Qualifying ==
Croatia was in Group A of UEFA's World Cup qualifications. They played alongside Belgium, Serbia, Scotland, Wales and Macedonia. Croatia finished as runner-up in the group and entered the Second Round play-offs where the team beat Iceland and qualified for the 2014 FIFA World Cup.

Croatia national team was led by manager Igor Štimac until October 16, 2013 when he was, due to a series of bad results, replaced by Niko Kovač.

The complete results of the group stage

7 September 2012
20:15 UTC+2

Croatia	1–0	North Macedonia
Jelavić 69'	Report

Stadion Maksimir, Zagreb
Attendance: 13,883
Referee: Alon Yefet (Israel)

11 September 2012
20:45 UTC+2

Belgium	1–1	Croatia
Gillet 45+1'	Report	Perišić 6'

King Baudouin Stadium, Brussels
Attendance: 39,987
Referee: Alberto Undiano Mallenco (Spain)

12 October 2012
20:30 UTC+2

North Macedonia	1–2	Croatia
Ibraimi 16'	Report	Ćorluka 33'; Rakitić 60'

Philip II Arena, Skopje
Attendance: 25,230
Referee: Peter Rasmussen (Denmark)

16 October 2012
20:00 UTC+2

Croatia	2–0	Wales
Mandžukić 27'; Eduardo 57'	Report

Stadion Gradski vrt, Osijek
Attendance: 17,500
Referee: Alexandru Tudor (Romania)

22 March 2013
18:00 UTC+1

Croatia	2–0	Serbia
Mandžukić 23'; Olić 37'	Report

Stadion Maksimir, Zagreb
Attendance: 35,722
Referee: Cüneyt Çakır (Turkey)

26 March 2013
19:45 UTC±0

Wales	1–2	Croatia
Bale 21' (pen.)	Report	Lovren 77'; Eduardo 87'

Liberty Stadium, Swansea
Attendance: 12,534
Referee: Luca Banti (Italy)

7 June 2013
20:15 UTC+2

Croatia	0–1	Scotland
	Report	Snodgrass 26'

Stadion Maksimir, Zagreb
Attendance: 25,016
Referee: David Fernández Borbalán (Spain)

6 September 2013
20:45 UTC+2

Serbia	1–1	Croatia
Mitrović 66'	Report	Mandžukić 53'

Stadion Crvena Zvezda, Belgrade
Attendance: 30,000
Referee: Felix Brych (Germany)

11 October 2013
18:00 UTC+2

Croatia	1–2	Belgium
Kranjčar 84'	Report	Lukaku 16', 38'

Stadion Maksimir, Zagreb
Attendance: 13,000
Referee: Howard Webb (England)

15 October 2013
20:00 UTC+1

Scotland	2–0	Croatia
Snodgrass 28'; Naismith 73'	Report

Hampden Park, Glasgow
Attendance: 30,172
Referee: Ovidiu Hațegan (Romania)

The final standings were the following:

Pos	Team	Pld	W	D	L	GF	GA	GD	Pts	Qualification	Belgium national football team	Croatia national football team	Serbia national football team	Scotland national football team	Wales national football team	North Macedonia national football team
1	Belgium	10	8	2	0	18	4	+14	26	Qualification to 2014 FIFA World Cup	—	1–1	2–1	2–0	1–1	1–0
2	Croatia	10	5	2	3	12	9	+3	17	Advance to second round	1–2	—	2–0	0–1	2–0	1–0
3	Serbia	10	4	2	4	18	11	+7	14		0–3	1–1	—	2–0	6–1	5–1
4	Scotland	10	3	2	5	8	12	−4	11		0–2	2–0	0–0	—	1–2	1–1
5	Wales	10	3	1	6	9	20	−11	10		0–2	1–2	0–3	2–1	—	1–0
6	Macedonia	10	2	1	7	7	16	−9	7		0–2	1–2	1–0	1–2	2–1	—

Croatia qualified for the Second round where they eliminated Iceland with a 2-0 aggregate score after a two-round play-off series.

15 November 2013
19:00 UTC±0

Iceland	0–0	Croatia
	Report

Laugardalsvöllur, Reykjavík
Attendance: 9,767
Referee: Alberto Undiano Mallenco (Spain)

19 November 2013
20:15 UTC+1

Croatia	2–0	Iceland
Mandžukić 27'; Srna 47'	Report

Stadion Maksimir, Zagreb
Attendance: 22,612
Referee: Björn Kuipers (Netherlands)

=== Players ===
Stipe Pletikosa and Mario Mandžukić are the only players that appeared in all 12 qualifying matches. Further more Pletikosa played the full 90 minutes of all the matches while Mandžukić was the top scorer with 4 achieved goal. Midfielder Marcelo Brozović and goalkeepers Danijel Subašić and Oliver Zelenika did not appear in any of the qualifying matches but made the final World Cup squad.

Complete list of players in the qualifying matches

#	Name	Games Played	Goals
1	Mario Mandžukić	12	4
1	Stipe Pletikosa	12	0
3	Darijo Srna	11	1
4	Ivan Perišić	10	1
4	Luka Modrić	10	0
6	Vedran Ćorluka	9	1
6	Ivan Rakitić	9	1
6	Ivan Strinić	9	0
6	Josip Šimunić	9	0
10	Eduardo	7	2
10	Dejan Lovren	7	1
10	Ivica Olić	7	1
10	Ognjen Vukojević	7	0
14	Nikica Jelavić	6	1
14	Niko Kranjčar	6	1
14	Mateo Kovačić	6	0
14	Domagoj Vida	6	0
18	Nikola Kalinić	5	0
19	Gordon Schildenfeld	4	0
20	Milan Badelj	3	0
20	Sammir	3	0
22	Danijel Pranjić	2	0
22	Ante Rebić	2	0
24	Leon Benko	1	0
24	Ivo Iličević	1	0
24	Josip Radošević	1	0
24	Šime Vrsaljko	1	0

Source: Croatian Football Federation

Player was not selected for the 2014 FIFA World Cup squad

== World Cup preparation ==
The Croatian national team's World Cup camp was in luxurious Tivoli Ecoresort near Praia do Forte and Mata de São João in Bahia. The team played three friendly matches before the tournament.

5 March 2014 Friendly	Switzerland	2–2	Croatia	St. Gallen, Switzerland
19:30 GMT	Drmić 33', 41'	Report	Olić 39', 54'	Stadium: AFG Arena; Attendance: 17,200; Referee: Hugo Filipe Ferreira de Campos Moreira Miguel (Portugal)

31 May 2014 Friendly	Croatia	2–1	Mali	Osijek, Croatia
14:00 GMT	Perišić 15', 63'	Report	Diarra 79'	Stadium: Gradski vrt Attendance: 15,212; Referee: István Vad (Hungary)

6 June 2014 Friendly	Croatia	1–0	Australia	Salvador, Brazil
	Jelavić 58'	Report		Stadium: Estádio de Pituaçu; Referee: Francisco Carlos do Nascimento (Brazil)

== Draw ==
Croatia was drawn into Group A. Croatia's opponents in the first stage were Brazil, Cameroon and Mexico. The match between the Brazil and Croatia opened the World Cup tournament.

== 2014 World Cup squad ==
Coach: Niko Kovač

The final squad was announced on 31 May 2014. With less than 48 hours until the opening game against Brazil, Milan Badelj was called up to replace the injured Ivan Močinić, after having previously been excluded from the final squad.

No.	Pos.	Player	Date of birth (age)	Caps	Club
1	GK	Stipe Pletikosa	8 January 1979 (aged 35)	111	(Russia) Rostov
2	DF	Šime Vrsaljko	10 January 1992 (aged 22)	7	(Italy) Genoa
3	DF	Danijel Pranjić	2 December 1981 (aged 32)	50	(Greece) Panathinaikos
4	MF	Ivan Perišić	2 February 1989 (aged 25)	29	(Germany) VfL Wolfsburg
5	DF	Vedran Ćorluka	5 February 1986 (aged 28)	72	(Russia) Lokomotiv Moscow
6	DF	Dejan Lovren	5 July 1989 (aged 24)	25	(England) Southampton
7	MF	Ivan Rakitić	10 March 1988 (aged 26)	62	(Spain) Sevilla
8	MF	Ognjen Vukojević	20 December 1983 (aged 30)	55	(Ukraine) Dynamo Kyiv
9	FW	Nikica Jelavić	27 August 1985 (aged 28)	33	(England) Hull City
10	MF	Luka Modrić	9 September 1985 (aged 28)	75	(Spain) Real Madrid
11	DF	Darijo Srna (c)	1 May 1982 (aged 32)	112	(Ukraine) Shakhtar Donetsk
12	GK	Oliver Zelenika	14 May 1993 (aged 21)	0	(Croatia) Lokomotiva
13	DF	Gordon Schildenfeld	18 March 1985 (aged 29)	21	(Greece) Panathinaikos
14	MF	Marcelo Brozović	16 October 1992 (aged 21)	1	(Croatia) Dinamo Zagreb
15	MF	Milan Badelj	25 February 1989 (aged 25)	9	(Germany) Hamburger SV
16	FW	Ante Rebić	21 September 1993 (aged 20)	5	(Italy) Fiorentina
17	FW	Mario Mandžukić	21 May 1986 (aged 28)	50	(Germany) Bayern Munich
18	FW	Ivica Olić	14 September 1979 (aged 34)	92	(Germany) VfL Wolfsburg
19	MF	Sammir	23 April 1987 (aged 27)	6	(Spain) Getafe
20	MF	Mateo Kovačić	6 May 1994 (aged 20)	10	(Italy) Internazionale
21	DF	Domagoj Vida	29 April 1989 (aged 25)	23	(Ukraine) Dynamo Kyiv
22	FW	Eduardo	25 February 1983 (aged 31)	63	(Ukraine) Shakhtar Donetsk
23	GK	Danijel Subašić	27 October 1984 (aged 29)	6	(France) Monaco

Team captain: Darijo Srna

== Standings ==
Legend
Group winners and runners-up advanced to the round of 16

Pos	Team	Pld	W	D	L	GF	GA	GD	Pts	Qualification
1	Brazil (H)	3	2	1	0	7	2	+5	7	Advance to knockout stage
2	Mexico	3	2	1	0	4	1	+3	7	Advance to knockout stage
3	Croatia	3	1	0	2	6	6	0	3	
4	Cameroon	3	0	0	3	1	9	−8	0	

Source: FIFA
Rules for classification: Tie-breaking criteria
(H) Hosts

== Matches ==
=== Brazil vs Croatia ===
The two teams had met in two previous matches, including in the 2006 FIFA World Cup group stage, won by Brazil 1–0. Croatia forward Mario Mandžukić was suspended for the match, after being sent off in the team's final qualifier against Iceland.

Croatia opened the scoring through a Marcelo own goal, as the ball bounced off him into the net after Nikica Jelavić deflected Ivica Olić's cross. Neymar equalised for the hosts with a 25-yard (23 m) shot after receiving a pass from Oscar. In the second half, Brazil took the lead with Neymar's penalty after Dejan Lovren was judged to have fouled Fred in the penalty area. Croatia had a potential equaliser disallowed, after a foul was called on the Brazilian goalkeeper, Júlio César. In added time, Oscar sealed the win, toe-poking the third goal for Brazil from 22 yards (20 m) after receiving a pass from Ramires.

Post-match, FIFA referees chief Massimo Busacca defended the officials for awarding the penalty and insisted there had been some contact between Lovren and Fred, even if it was minimal. On the other hand, renowned former top-level FIFA referee Markus Merk criticised FIFA for having Yuichi Nishimura as the referee in the opening match, labelling the refereeing in the match as "embarrassing".

The game was notable for a number of pioneering events. This was the first occasion in FIFA World Cup history on which an own goal (which was also the first ever own goal scored by Brazil in World Cup finals) opened scoring in the tournament. As the first game played at this World Cup, the match also saw the first use of vanishing spray to mark free kick spots, and the advent of goal-line technology, two innovations introduced during the tournament.

12 June 2014
17:00 UTC−3

Brazil	3–1	Croatia
Neymar 29', 71' (pen.); Oscar 90+1'	Report	Marcelo 11' (o.g.)

Arena de São Paulo, São Paulo
Attendance: 62,103
Referee: Yuichi Nishimura (Japan)

Brazil	Croatia

GK	12	Júlio César
RB	2	Dani Alves
CB	3	Thiago Silva (c)
CB	4	David Luiz
LB	6	Marcelo
DM	8	Paulinho		(substituted off) 63'
DM	17	Luiz Gustavo	(yellow card) 88'
RW	7	Hulk		(substituted off) 68'
AM	11	Oscar
LW	10	Neymar	(yellow card) 27'	(substituted off) 88'
CF	9	Fred
Substitutions:
MF	18	Hernanes		(substituted on) 63'
MF	20	Bernard		(substituted on) 68'
MF	16	Ramires		(substituted on) 88'
Manager:
Luiz Felipe Scolari

GK	1	Stipe Pletikosa
RB	11	Darijo Srna (c)
CB	5	Vedran Ćorluka	(yellow card) 65'
CB	6	Dejan Lovren	(yellow card) 69'
LB	2	Šime Vrsaljko
CM	10	Luka Modrić
CM	7	Ivan Rakitić
RW	4	Ivan Perišić
AM	20	Mateo Kovačić		(substituted off) 61'
LW	18	Ivica Olić
CF	9	Nikica Jelavić		(substituted off) 78'
Substitutions:
MF	14	Marcelo Brozović		(substituted on) 61'
FW	16	Ante Rebić		(substituted on) 78'
Manager:
Niko Kovač

Man of the Match:
Neymar (Brazil)

Assistant referees:
Toru Sagara (Japan)
Toshiyuki Nagi (Japan)
Fourth official:
Alireza Faghani (Iran)
Fifth official:
Hassan Kamranifar (Iran)

=== Cameroon vs Croatia ===
The two teams had never met before.

In a match where both teams needed at least a point to stay alive in the competition, Croatia opened scoring when Ivica Olić scored from close range from Ivan Perišić's pass. Just before half time, Cameroon was reduced to ten men when Alex Song was dismissed for an off the ball incident with Mario Mandžukić. Perišić scored at the beginning of the second half when he intercepted Cameroonian goalkeeper Charles Itandje's goal kick and ran 50 yards before slotting in at the near post. Mandžukić scored the last two goals, the first a header from Danijel Pranjić's corner and the second a tap in after Itandje parried Eduardo's shot into his path. The result confirmed Cameroon's elimination from the tournament.

In a case of infighting, Cameroonian defender Benoît Assou-Ekotto was caught on camera head-butting teammate Benjamin Moukandjo. Song later apologised to Mandžukić and his country for his ejection, while Cameroonian coach Volker Finke said he was very disappointed with their performance.

On 1 July 2014, Cameroon officials announced that they had opened an investigation on claims that seven of the Cameroon's players were involved in fixing the result. FIFA, however, said there was no evidence that there were any match fixing in any of Cameroon's matches.

Olić, who previously scored a goal in the 2002 World Cup, became the second player to have a 12-year gap between World Cup goals, after Michael Laudrup in 1986 and 1998. Mandžukić became the first Croatian player to score a brace in a World Cup game. The 4–0 scoreline was also the biggest win by Croatia in the World Cup.

18 June 2014
18:00 UTC−4

Cameroon	0–4	Croatia
	Report	Olić 11'; Perišić 48'; Mandžukić 61', 73'

Arena da Amazônia, Manaus
Attendance: 39,982
Referee: Pedro Proença (Portugal)

Cameroon	Croatia

GK	16	Charles Itandje
RB	17	Stéphane Mbia
CB	14	Aurélien Chedjou		(substituted off) 46'
CB	3	Nicolas N'Koulou (c)
LB	2	Benoît Assou-Ekotto
DM	21	Joël Matip
CM	6	Alex Song	(red card) 40'
CM	18	Eyong Enoh
RW	13	Eric Maxim Choupo-Moting		(substituted off) 75'
LW	8	Benjamin Moukandjo
CF	10	Vincent Aboubakar		(substituted off) 70'
Substitutions:
DF	5	Dany Nounkeu		(substituted on) 46'
FW	15	Pierre Webó		(substituted on) 70'
MF	20	Edgar Salli		(substituted on) 75'
Manager:
(Germany) Volker Finke

GK	1	Stipe Pletikosa
RB	11	Darijo Srna (c)
CB	5	Vedran Ćorluka
CB	6	Dejan Lovren
LB	3	Danijel Pranjić
CM	10	Luka Modrić
CM	7	Ivan Rakitić
RW	4	Ivan Perišić		(substituted off) 78'
AM	19	Sammir		(substituted off) 72'
LW	18	Ivica Olić		(substituted off) 69'
CF	17	Mario Mandžukić
Substitutions:
FW	22	Eduardo	(yellow card) 89'	(substituted on) 69'
MF	20	Mateo Kovačić		(substituted on) 72'
FW	16	Ante Rebić		(substituted on) 78'
Manager:
Niko Kovač

Man of the Match:
Mario Mandžukić (Croatia)

Assistant referees:
Bertino Cunha (Portugal)
Tiago Trigo (Portugal)
Fourth official:
Walter López (Guatemala)
Fifth official:
Leonel Leal (Costa Rica)

=== Croatia vs Mexico ===
The two teams had met in three previous matches, including in the 2002 FIFA World Cup group stage, won by Mexico 1–0.

Coming into the final round of matches, Croatia needed to win to guarantee qualification to the knockout stage regardless of the result of Cameroon vs Brazil, while Mexico only needed a draw to do so. The game was goalless for the first 70 minutes, until a Héctor Herrera corner to the back post allowed Rafael Márquez to score from a header, outleaping the Croatian defenders. With Croatia progressing only by way of a win, they were caught out on a break a short time later where Andrés Guardado scored after receiving a pass from Oribe Peralta. Mexico scored their third goal when Márquez flicked on Guardado's corner with substitute Javier Hernández scoring at the back post. Ivan Perišić scored in his second consecutive World Cup match after a neat back pass from Ivan Rakitić to get a consolation goal for Croatia in the closing minutes of the game, before Croatia's Ante Rebić was sent off for a foul on Carlos Peña. Mexico qualified as group runners-up (behind Brazil on goal difference) on virtue of the win, while Croatia were eliminated.

With his goal, Márquez joined Cuauhtémoc Blanco as the only Mexican player to score in three World Cups.

23 June 2014
17:00 UTC−3

Croatia	1–3	Mexico
Perišić 87'	Report	Márquez 72'; Guardado 75'; Hernández 82'

Arena Pernambuco, Recife
Attendance: 41,212
Referee: Ravshan Irmatov (Uzbekistan)

Croatia	Mexico

GK	1	Stipe Pletikosa
RB	11	Darijo Srna (c)
CB	5	Vedran Ćorluka
CB	6	Dejan Lovren
LB	2	Šime Vrsaljko		(substituted off) 58'
CM	7	Ivan Rakitić	(yellow card) 9'
CM	3	Danijel Pranjić		(substituted off) 74'
RW	4	Ivan Perišić
AM	10	Luka Modrić
LW	18	Ivica Olić		(substituted off) 69'
CF	17	Mario Mandžukić
Substitutions:
MF	20	Mateo Kovačić		(substituted on) 58'
FW	16	Ante Rebić	(red card) 89'	(substituted on) 69'
FW	9	Nikica Jelavić		(substituted on) 74'
Manager:
Niko Kovač

GK	13	Guillermo Ochoa
CB	2	Francisco Rodríguez
CB	4	Rafael Márquez (c)	(yellow card) 39'
CB	15	Héctor Moreno
RWB	22	Paul Aguilar
LWB	7	Miguel Layún
DM	23	José Juan Vázquez	(yellow card) 66'
CM	6	Héctor Herrera
CM	18	Andrés Guardado		(substituted off) 84'
SS	10	Giovani dos Santos		(substituted off) 62'
CF	19	Oribe Peralta		(substituted off) 79'
Substitutions:
FW	14	Javier Hernández		(substituted on) 62'
MF	21	Carlos Peña		(substituted on) 79'
MF	8	Marco Fabián		(substituted on) 84'
Manager:
Miguel Herrera

Man of the Match:
Rafael Márquez (Mexico) Assistant referees:
Abdukhamidullo Rasulov (Uzbekistan)
Bakhadyr Kochkarov (Kyrgyzstan)
Fourth official:
Néant Alioum (Cameroon)
Fifth official:
Djibril Camara (Senegal)
