= Lacković =

Lacković may refer to:

- House of Lacković, a medieval Croatian-Hungarian noble family
- Blaženko Lacković (born 1980) (born 1980), Croatian handball player
- Goran Lacković (born 1970), Croatian footballer and manager
- Ivan Lacković Croata (1932–2004), Croatian naive painter
