= Plantak =

Plantak is a Croatian surname.

It is among the most common surnames in Varaždin County of Croatia.

It may refer to:

- Karlo Plantak (born 1997), Croatian football player
