= Niko Kovač =

Football manager (born 1971)

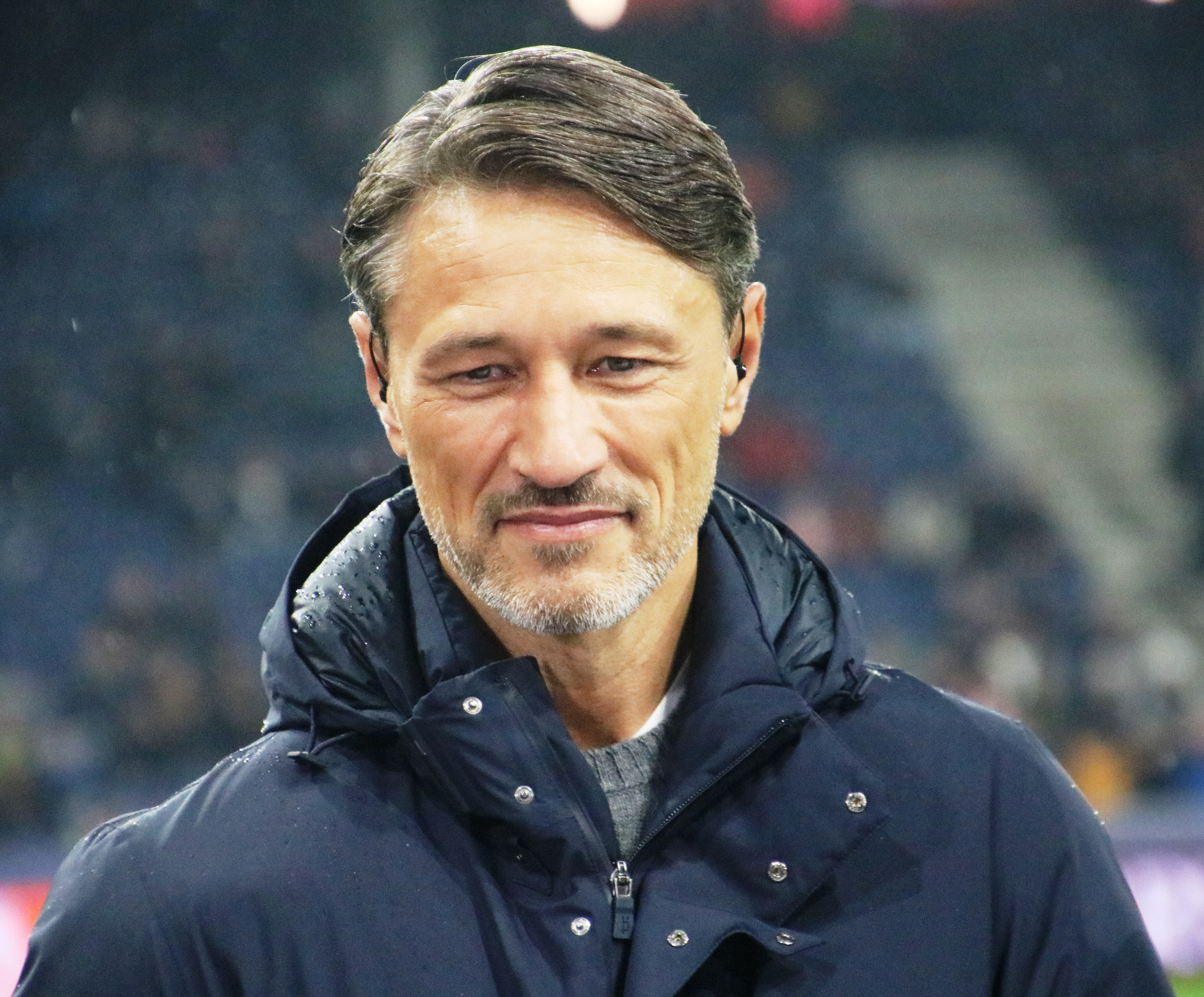
- Kovač in 2024

Personal information
- Full name: Niko Kovač
- Date of birth: 15 October 1971 (age 55)
- Place of birth: West Berlin, West Germany
- Height: 1.76 m (5 ft 9 in)
- Position: Defensive midfielder

Team information
- Current team: Borussia Dortmund (manager)

Youth career
- 1987–1989: Rapide Wedding
- 1989–1990: Hertha Zehlendorf

Senior career*
Years	Team	Apps	(Gls)
1990–1991	Hertha Zehlendorf	25	(7)
1991	Hertha BSC II	12	(1)
1992–1996	Hertha BSC	138	(15)
1996–1999	Bayer Leverkusen	77	(8)
1999–2001	Hamburger SV	55	(12)
2001–2003	Bayern Munich	34	(3)
2003–2006	Hertha BSC	75	(8)
2006–2009	Red Bull Salzburg	65	(9)
Total		491	(63)

International career
1996–2008	Croatia	83	(14)

Managerial career
- 2012–2013: Croatia U21
- 2013–2015: Croatia
- 2016–2018: Eintracht Frankfurt
- 2018–2019: Bayern Munich
- 2020–2022: Monaco
- 2022–2024: VfL Wolfsburg
- 2025–: Borussia Dortmund
- * Club domestic league appearances and goals

Niko Kovač (Croatian pronunciation: [nǐːko kǒʋaːtʃ, – kô-]; born 15 October 1971) is a professional football manager and former player who is the manager of Bundesliga club Borussia Dortmund.

Born and raised in West Germany, Kovač was the long-standing captain of the Croatia national team until his retirement from international football in January 2009. A defensive midfielder who was known for his passing and tackling skills, Kovač was, at the time of his retirement, the oldest player in the Croatian squad and had captained them at the 2006 FIFA World Cup and UEFA Euro 2008. He has also enjoyed a high level of top club action, having spent most of his club career in the German Bundesliga, including spells with Hertha BSC, Bayer Leverkusen, Hamburger SV and Bayern Munich.

He ended his playing career with Austrian club Red Bull Salzburg, where he then took the non-playing role of the reserve team coach and eventually became assistant manager under team manager Ricardo Moniz. In January 2013, Kovač took over the Croatia national under-21 team and in October 2013 he took over the Croatia senior team following the dismissal of Igor Štimac. Kovač managed Croatia at the 2014 FIFA World Cup, then became head coach of Eintracht Frankfurt in 2016, winning the 2018 DFB-Pokal Final with the club. At Bayern, Kovač won the domestic double in 2019 after a strong ending to the season, but lost his job later in autumn. He then managed Monaco from 2020 to 2022 before returning to the German football league. Initially managing Wolfsburg from 2022 to 2024, Kovač took over Borussia Dortmund in January 2025.

== Club career ==
=== Early career (1987–1996) ===
Kovač started training football as an eight-year old with Rapide Wedding in Berlin. After that, he joined Hertha Zehlendorf and soon became a member of the first team. He moved to Hertha BSC in 1991 and started his professional career with the club that competed in the 2. Bundesliga at the time.

During his youth, Kovač in parallel with football practiced judo, earning the blue belt. After finishing high school (gymnasium), he continued his education at Free University of Berlin. He pursued a degree in business studies while playing for Hertha BSC. After eight semesters, he left university when he secured a contract with Bayer Leverkusen.

Kovač joined Hamburger SV in the summer of 1999 and spent two seasons with the club, making 55 Bundesliga appearances and scoring 12 goals in the Bundesliga.

=== Red Bull Salzburg (2006–2009) ===
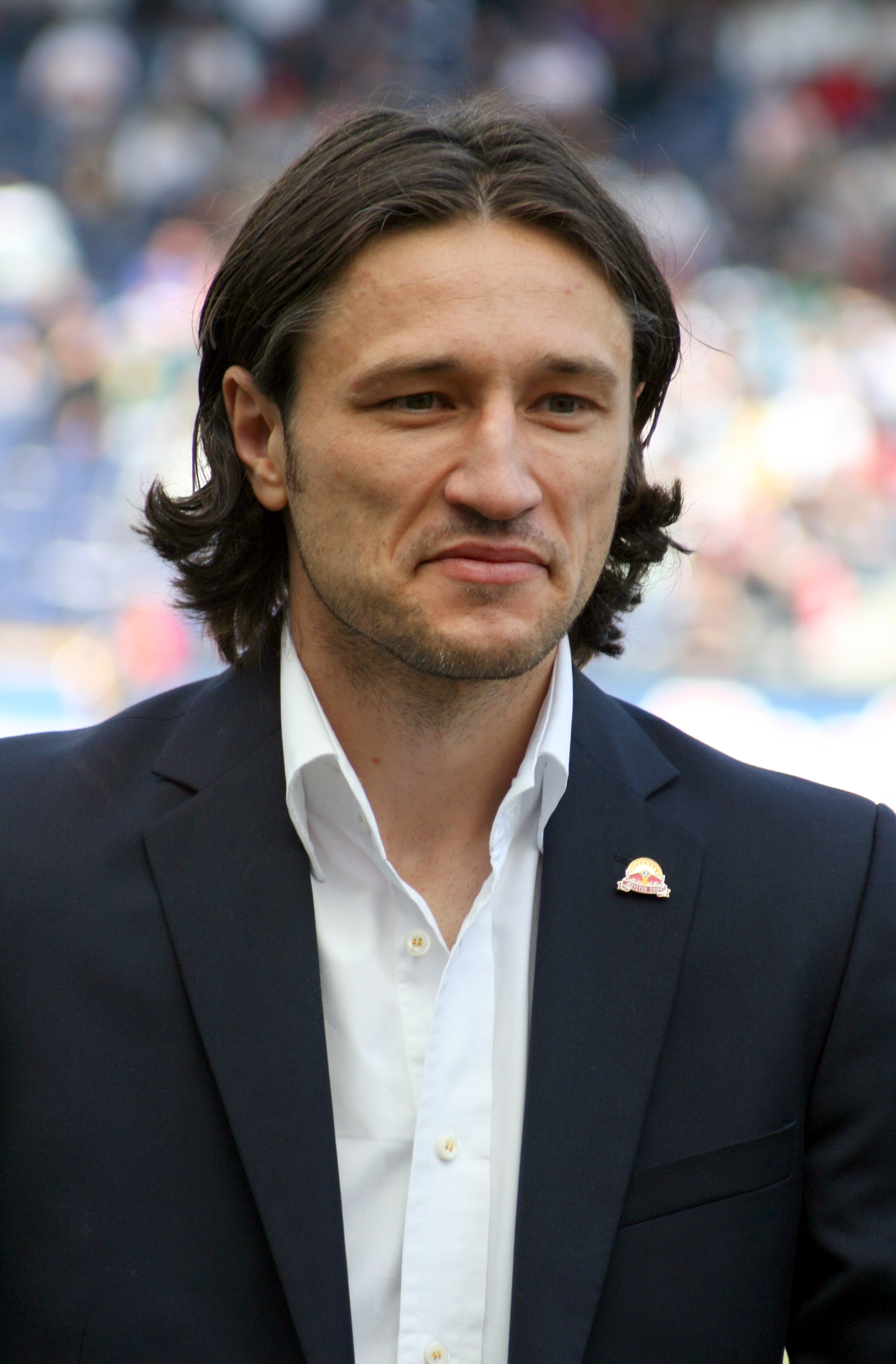
Kovač in 2009

After the 2006 FIFA World Cup, Kovač left Hertha after three seasons for Austrian Bundesliga side Red Bull Salzburg. He was a regular in the Salzburg team and also appeared in all of their four UEFA Champions League qualifiers in the summer of 2006. On 26 August 2006, he scored his first goal for Red Bull Salzburg in the Bundesliga, netting the second goal in their 4–0 home victory over Wacker Tirol. He signed one more year until summer 2009 in May 2008. On 29 May 2009, Kovač left after three years with Red Bull and retired from professional football. He played his last match for Red Bull in a friendly against former club Bayern Munich; he was substituted off after the first 15 minutes.

== International career ==
Kovač made his senior international debut in Croatia's friendly match against Morocco on 11 December 1996 in Casablanca.

After Euro 2004, Kovač became the Croatia national team's captain and led the team through the qualifying campaign for the 2006 FIFA World Cup finals in Germany. He appeared in nine of ten qualifying matches and scored two goals, both in Croatia's 4–0 victory over Iceland at home in Zagreb. At the final tournament, he appeared in all three of Croatia's group matches, despite sustaining an injury which forced him to leave the pitch after 40 minutes of the team's opening match against Brazil. Kovač scored the goal that put Croatia 2–1 up in the final group match against Australia.

Kovač finally announced his international retirement on 7 January 2009, stating a desire that younger players should be given experience in the Croatia side.

== Coaching career ==
=== Red Bull Salzburg ===
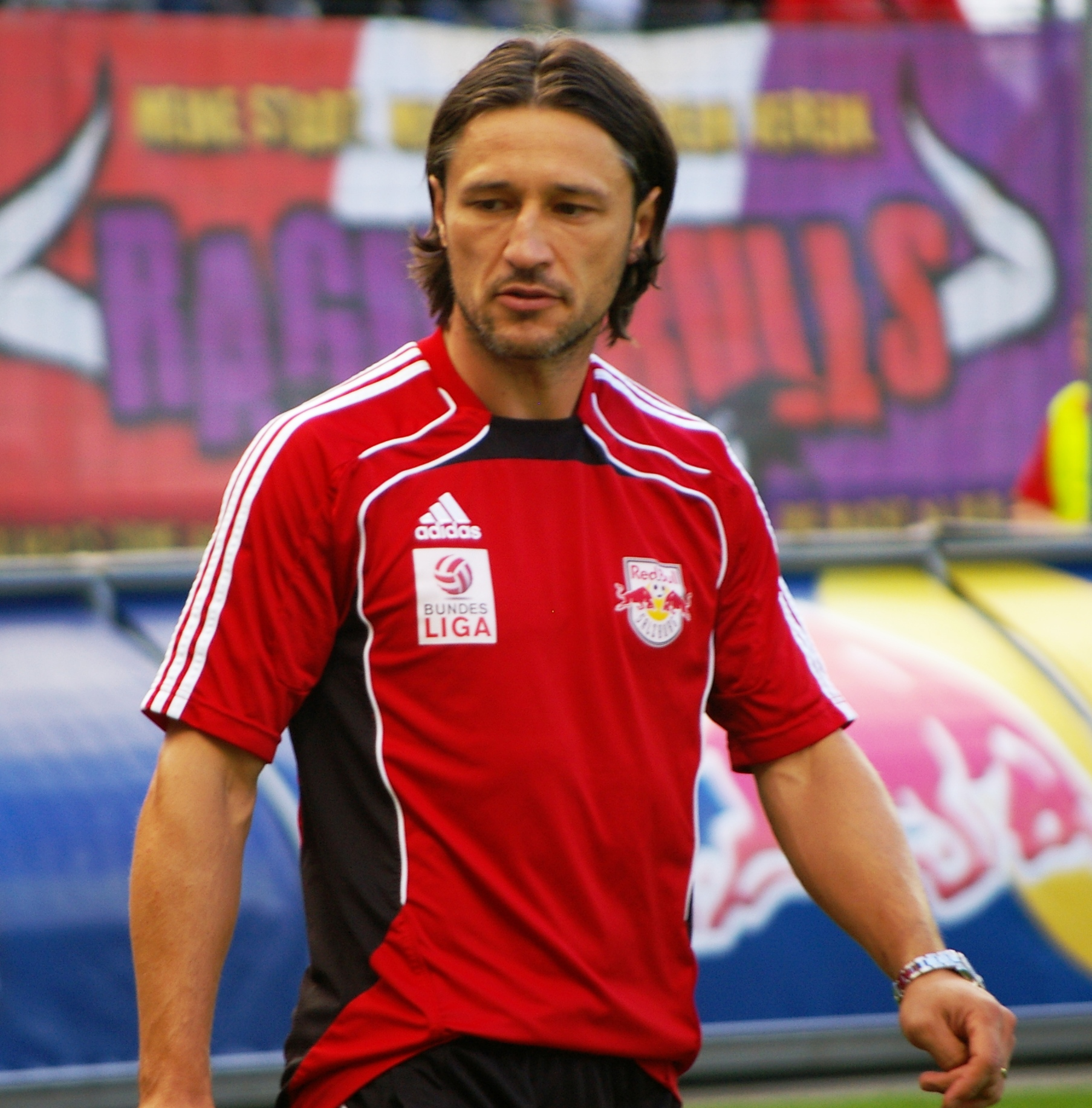
Kovač as the assistant coach for Red Bull Salzburg, 2011

After his retirement from professional football, Kovač became coach of the reserve team of Red Bull Salzburg, Red Bull Juniors, between 16 June 2009 to 7 April 2011. In the 2009–10 season, he finished in sixth place and were knocked out in the Austrian Cup in the second round in a shootout. He was with the second team until 7 April 2011. His final match was a 1–1 draw against SV Seekirchen. In 2011, he was promoted to being assistant coach of the first squad together with Ricardo Moniz as head coach. After Moniz resigned as a first-team coach in June 2012, Kovač was one of the favourites for taking his position. However, the position went to Roger Schmidt and Kovač subsequently left Salzburg.

=== Croatia ===
==== Under-21 ====
On 21 January 2013, Igor Štimac, head coach of the Croatia national team, announced that Kovač, alongside his brother Robert as assistant coach, would take over as the under-21 team head coach.

==== Senior ====
On 16 October 2013, Davor Šuker, president of the Croatian Football Federation, announced that Niko Kovač was appointed caretaker manager of the Croatia senior team. He replaced Štimac, who was sacked after Croatia scraped into the World Cup play-offs having taken only one point from their last four qualifiers. However, one day later, in an inaugural press conference, Šuker stated HNS signed a two-year contract with Kovač and his staff including his brother Robert Kovač, Vatroslav Mihačić and Goran Lacković, until the end of Croatia's UEFA Euro 2016 campaign. His first two matches for Croatia were in the World Cup play-offs against Iceland. Croatia managed to qualify for the 2014 FIFA World Cup in Brazil after winning the play-off tie against Iceland 2–0 on aggregate. At the World Cup, Croatia won 4–0 against Cameroon and lost 3–1 against Brazil and Mexico. Croatia did not qualify from their group. On 9 September 2015, HNS terminated Kovač's contract after Croatia lost 2–0 against Norway in the UEFA Euro 2016 qualifying.

=== Eintracht Frankfurt ===
Kovač was appointed as head coach of Eintracht Frankfurt on 8 March 2016. He made his managerial debut for Eintracht in a 3–0 loss against Borussia Mönchengladbach. The club only finished the season in 16th place, requiring them to play in the relegation play-offs against 1. FC Nürnberg. After drawing the first leg 1–1 at home, Kovač ensured Eintracht's survival in the Bundesliga after Haris Seferovic's goal won the second leg 1–0. Kovač received a Fair Play Prize from the DOSB for his gesture of comforting Nürnberg's players after their defeat.

In the 2016–17 season, Eintracht managed to finish mid-table in eleventh position, as well as notably reaching the 2017 DFB-Pokal Final, club's first final since 2006, where Eintracht lost 1–2 against Borussia Dortmund. In the 2017–18 season, Eintracht competed for a place in European competition for the following season. Kovač has typically used a 3–4–2–1 formation with emphasis on defensive stability and wing play. He took Eintracht to the 2018 DFB-Pokal Final, the second in succession for the club, where he beat his future employer, Bayern Munich. With that victory, Kovač led Eintracht to its first trophy since 1988. He finished with a record of 38 wins, 20 draws and 33 losses in 91 matches. Adi Hütter became his successor.

=== Bayern Munich ===
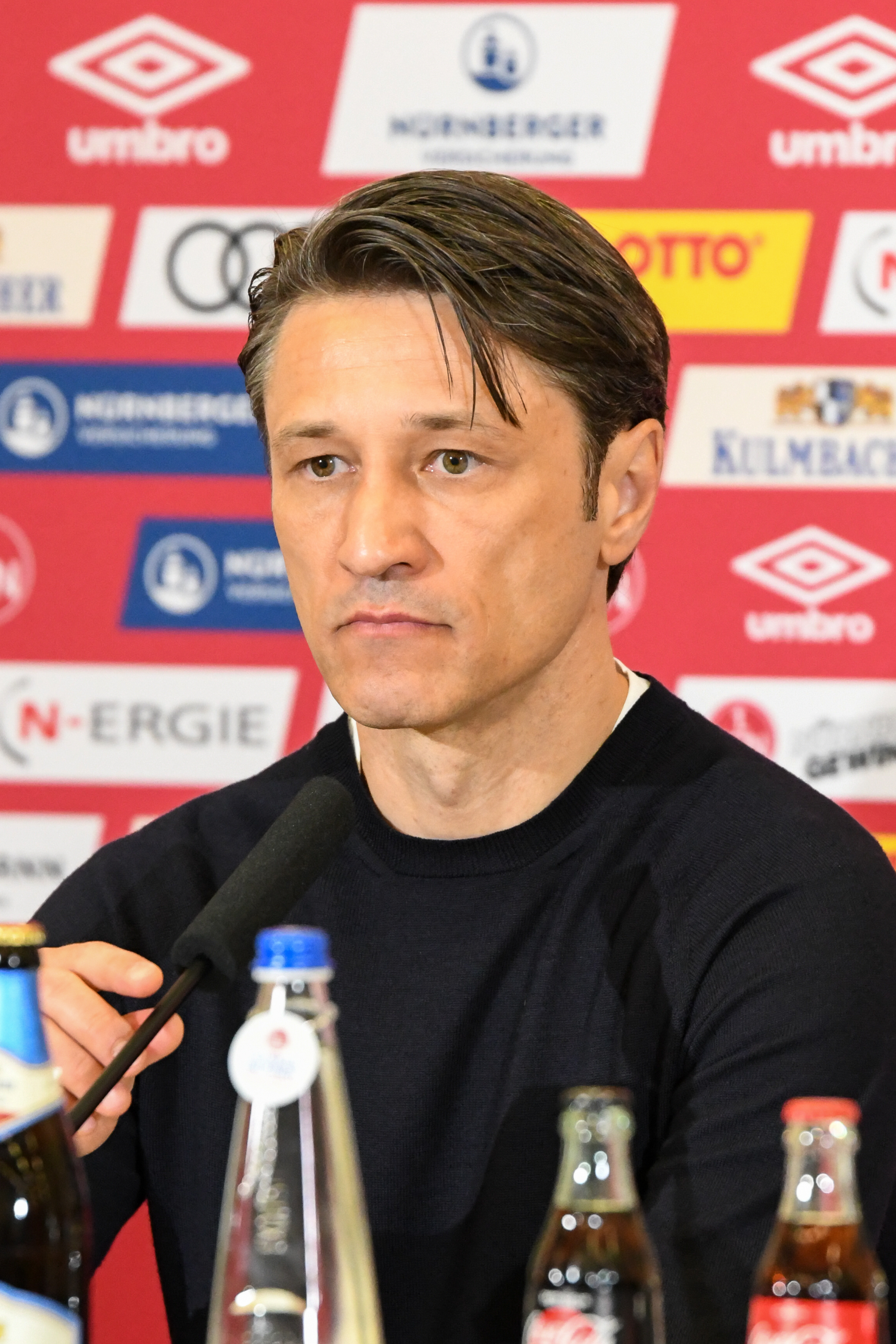
Kovač with Bayern Munich in 2019

On 13 April 2018, Bayern Munich announced that Kovač would succeed Jupp Heynckes as head coach of the club for the 2018–19 season, with a three-year contract lasting until 30 June 2021. Kovač's brother, Robert, served as assistant coach to him. Kovač had a contract with Frankfurt until 30 June 2018 and Bayern had to pay a release clause in his contract reported to be around €2.2 million. Kovač is just the fourth former player to manage Bayern Munich after Søren Lerby, Franz Beckenbauer and Jürgen Klinsmann. Kovač was the third Croatian to manage Bayern after Zlatko Čajkovski and Branko Zebec.

On 12 August, Kovač won his first match as coach of Bayern 5–0 in the German Super Cup against his former club, Eintracht Frankfurt. He won his first Bundesliga game in charge as Bayern defeated 1899 Hoffenheim 3–1 at home on 25 August.

On 25 May 2019, Kovač led Bayern to a league and cup double when Bayern defeated RB Leipzig 3–0 in the 2019 DFB-Pokal Final. It was Kovač's second consecutive cup victory as he became the first coach since Felix Magath in 2005 and 2006 to win back-to-back cup titles. Kovač also became the first person to win a league and cup double both as a player and coach in German football. On 1 October, Bayern defeated Tottenham Hotspur 7–2 in the Champions League, with Serge Gnabry scoring four goals. It was Bayern's second highest victory in European competitions, only behind their 7–1 victory against Roma in October 2014. On 3 November, Kovač left by mutual agreement after a 5–1 loss to his former club, Eintracht Frankfurt.

=== Monaco ===
On 19 July 2020, Kovač was appointed as head coach at Ligue 1 club Monaco. In his first game as Monaco coach on 23 August, Kovač secured a 2–2 draw after being two goals down against Reims. On 20 November, Monaco beat French champions and Champions League finalists Paris Saint-Germain 3–2 after falling behind 0–2. On 21 February 2021, he defeated Paris Saint-Germain once again, this time 2–0. It was the first time since March 2016 that Monaco won at Parc des Princes. Kovač was subsequently widely praised by French sports media. On 19 May, Monaco lost 2–0 to Paris Saint-Germain in the Coupe de France Final. On 1 January 2022, Monaco announced the departure of Kovač.

=== VfL Wolfsburg ===
VfL Wolfsburg announced the appointment of Kovač on 24 May 2022, marking his return to the Bundesliga after three years. He was sacked in March 2024.

=== Borussia Dortmund ===
Kovač signed an 18-month deal with Borussia Dortmund on 29 January 2025. Kovač took charge with the team in 11th place. Under his leadership, Dortmund reached the Champions League quarter-finals, where they were eliminated by Barcelona. On the final matchday, the club climbed to fourth, securing Champions League qualification for the next season. On 26 August 2025, he extended his contract until 2027.

== Managerial style ==
Throughout his career at various clubs, Kovac has implemented a mix of 4-2-3-1 and 4-3-3 formations with a clear focus on how the team plays without possession. He works on increasing his team's intensity behind the ball so they are able to defend in a compact, mid-high press to force their opponents wide. As soon as they would win the ball, they make use of their quick players in fast transitions.

== Personal life ==
Kovač was born on 15 October 1971 in Wedding, West Berlin, to a Bosnian Croat family hailing from Livno, Bosnia and Herzegovina. His parents, Mato and Ivka, emigrated from SFR Yugoslavia to West Germany in 1970 as part of the gastarbeiter program. He has two younger siblings, brother Robert and sister Nikolina. Kovač is also a German national, thus eligible to represent Germany, Croatia, and Bosnia and Herzegovina at international level; he opted for Croatia.

Kovač married his primary school sweetheart in 1999. They have a daughter named Laura. Kovač is a Roman Catholic. He generally lives a quiet family life, and considers a family of great value and tries to convey that to his players.

I am Niko Kovač, captain of the Croatia national football team. I was born and I am living in diaspora. I look forward to every appearance under our flag and national anthem. My brother Robert, as well! Now, some people say we should not have a right to vote. And that's why – HDZ and Dr Ivo Sanader!

— Niko Kovač in the Croatian Democratic Union (HDZ)'s election campaign video, 2007

In 2007, Kovač appeared in Croatian Democratic Union (HDZ)'s campaign video for that year's parliamentary election. The video focuses on Croatian diaspora's right to vote, and depicts Kovač talking about his connection with his homeland. One of the lines from the video, "Moj brat Robert, također!" (My brother Robert, as well), entered Croatian popular culture and is frequently quoted by the people and the media in the country when referring to the brothers.

== Career statistics ==
=== Club ===
Club	Season	League			Cup		League Cup		Continental		Other		Total	
Club	Season	Division	Apps	Goals	Apps	Goals	Apps	Goals	Apps	Goals	Apps	Goals	Apps	Goals
Hertha Zehlendorf	1990–91	Oberliga Berlin	25	7	—		—		—		—		25	7
Hertha BSC II	1990–91	Oberliga Berlin	12	1	—		—		—		—		12	1
Hertha BSC	1991–92	2. Bundesliga Nord	12	0	0	0	—		—		—		12	0
Hertha BSC	1992–93	2. Bundesliga	42	1	3	0	—		—		—		45	1
Hertha BSC	1993–94	2. Bundesliga	32	1	0	0	—		—		—		32	1
Hertha BSC	1994–95	2. Bundesliga	31	2	1	0	—		—		—		32	2
Hertha BSC	1995–96	2. Bundesliga	31	11	2	0	—		—		—		33	11
Hertha BSC	Total		148	15	6	0	—		—		—		154	15
Bayer Leverkusen	1996–97	Bundesliga	32	3	1	0	—		—		—		33	3
Bayer Leverkusen	1997–98	Bundesliga	18	1	3	1	1	0	7 (Note: Appearances in the UEFA Champions League.)	0	—		29	2
Bayer Leverkusen	1998–99	Bundesliga	27	4	1	0	2	0	4 (Note: Appearances in the UEFA Cup.)	0	—		34	4
Bayer Leverkusen	Total		77	8	5	1	3	0	11	0	—		96	9
Hamburger SV	1999–2000	Bundesliga	30	8	1	0	—		—		—		31	8
Hamburger SV	2000–01	Bundesliga	25	4	1	0	1	0	9 (Note: Appearances in the UEFA Champions League and UEFA Cup.)	1	—		36	5
Hamburger SV	Total		55	12	2	0	1	0	9	1	—		67	13
Bayern Munich	2001–02	Bundesliga	16	2	3	1	1	0	4	0	2 (Note: Appearances in the UEFA Super Cup and Intercontinental Cup.)	0	26	3
Bayern Munich	2002–03	Bundesliga	18	1	4	0	1	0	2	1	—		25	2
Bayern Munich	Total		34	3	7	1	2	0	6	1	2	0	51	5
Hertha BSC	2003–04	Bundesliga	17	1	3	0	—		1	0	—		21	1
Hertha BSC	2004–05	Bundesliga	30	4	1	0	—		—		—		31	4
Hertha BSC	2005–06	Bundesliga	28	3	3	1	1	0	4	0	—		36	4
Hertha BSC	Total		75	8	7	1	1	0	5	0	—		88	9
Red Bull Salzburg	2006–07	Austrian Bundesliga	28	6	1	0	—		6	0	—		35	6
Red Bull Salzburg	2007–08	Austrian Bundesliga	25	3	—		—		4	0	—		29	3
Red Bull Salzburg	2008–09	Austrian Bundesliga	12	0	0	0	—		3	0	—		15	0
Red Bull Salzburg	Total		65	9	1	0	—		13	0	—		79	9
Career total			491	63	28	3	7	0	44	2	2	0	572	68

=== International goals ===
Goal	Date	Venue	Opponent	Score	Final	Competition
1	29 March 2000	Maksimir, Zagreb	Germany	1–1	1–1	Friendly
2	5 September 2001	Olimpico, Serravalle	San Marino	1–0	4–0	World Cup 2002 Qualifying
3	8 May 2002	PMFC, Pécs	Hungary	2–0	2–0	Friendly
4	11 June 2003	A. Le Coq Arena, Tallinn	Estonia	1–0	1–0	Euro 2004 Qualifying
5	6 September 2003	Comunal, Aixovall	Andorra	1–0	3–0	Euro 2004 Qualifying
6	21 June 2004	Estádio da Luz, Lisbon	England	1–0	2–4	Euro 2004
7–8	26 March 2005	Maksimir, Zagreb	Iceland	1–0	4–0	World Cup 2006 Qualifying
7–8	26 March 2005	Maksimir, Zagreb	Iceland	3–0	4–0	World Cup 2006 Qualifying
9	22 June 2006	Gottlieb-Daimler, Stuttgart	Australia	2–1	2–2	World Cup 2006
10–11	22 August 2007	Koševo, Sarajevo	Bosnia and Herzegovina	3–2	5–3	Friendly
10–11	22 August 2007	Koševo, Sarajevo	Bosnia and Herzegovina	5–3	5–3	Friendly
12	24 May 2008	Kantrida, Rijeka	Moldova	1–0	1–0	Friendly
13	31 May 2008	Szusza Ferenc, Budapest	Hungary	1–0	1–1	Friendly
14	6 September 2008	Maksimir, Zagreb	Kazakhstan	1–0	3–0	World Cup 2010 Qualifying

== Managerial statistics ==
As of 21 November 2026

Managerial record by team and tenure
Team	From	To	Record								Ref.
Team	From	To	G	W	D	L	GF	GA	GD	Win %	Ref.
Croatia U21	21 January 2013	16 October 2013	7	5	0	2	18	5	+13	71.43	
Croatia	16 October 2013	9 September 2015	19	10	5	4	36	16	+20	52.63	
Eintracht Frankfurt	8 March 2016	30 June 2018	91	38	20	33	111	108	+3	41.76	
Bayern Munich	1 July 2018	3 November 2019	65	45	12	8	169	73	+96	69.23	
Monaco	19 July 2020	1 January 2022	74	42	16	16	131	76	+55	56.76	
VfL Wolfsburg	24 May 2022	17 March 2024	66	23	17	26	96	93	+3	34.85	
Borussia Dortmund	2 February 2025	present	90	55	17	18	183	106	+77	61.11	
Total			413	218	88	107	744	476	+268	52.78	

== Honours ==
=== Player ===
Bayern Munich

- Bundesliga: 2002–03
- DFB-Pokal: 2002–03
- Intercontinental Cup: 2001

Red Bull Salzburg

- Austrian Bundesliga: 2006–07

=== Manager ===
Eintracht Frankfurt

- DFB-Pokal: 2017–18; runner-up: 2016–17

Bayern Munich

- Bundesliga: 2018–19
- DFB-Pokal: 2018–19
- DFL-Supercup: 2018

Monaco

- Coupe de France runner-up: 2020–21
