= Rubin Stadium =

Football stadium in Kazan, Russia

Coordinates: 55.8494°N 49.0864°E

Rubin Stadium is a football stadium in Kazan, Russia. It is located in the training ground of FC Rubin Kazan, and served as their home stadium until 1960. It has a capacity of 7,847. It was used as a venue for the 2013 Summer Universiade.
