= Jari Schuurman =

Dutch footballer (born 1997)

Personal information
- Full name: Jari Schuurman van Klaveren
- Date of birth: 22 February 1997 (age 29)
- Place of birth: Gorinchem, Netherlands
- Height: 1.80 m (5 ft 11 in)
- Position: Midfielder

Team information
- Current team: Willem II
- Number: 10

Youth career
- GJS
- 2004–2015: Feyenoord

Senior career*
Years	Team	Apps	(Gls)
2016–2019	Feyenoord	1	(0)
2016–2017	→ Willem II (loan)	11	(3)
2017–2018	→ NEC (loan)	18	(2)
2019	→ Dordrecht (loan)	16	(4)
2019–2025	Dordrecht	164	(20)
2025–	Willem II	8	(0)

International career
2013	Netherlands U16	1	(0)
2013–2014	Netherlands U17	10	(4)
2015–2016	Netherlands U19	21	(4)
- * Club domestic league appearances and goals as of 6 December 2025

Jari Schuurman van Klaveren (born 22 February 1997) is a Dutch professional footballer who plays as a midfielder for Eredivisie club Willem II.

== Club career ==
=== Feyenoord ===
Schuurman made his senior debut on 8 May 2016, coming on as 87th-minute substitute for Tonny Vilhena in a 1–0 Eredivisie win over NEC. He played this one match for Feyenoord. He moved to Willem II on a loan for the 2016–17 season, and the season after moved to NEC on a loan.

=== Dordrecht ===
On 30 January 2019, Schuurman moved to Dordrecht on a loan for the remainder of the 2018–19 season. After the season, he signed a three-year contract at the club.

=== Return to Willem II ===
In July 2025, Schuurman returned to Willem II with a two-year contract.

== International career ==
Schuurman represented Dutch youth teams at U15, U16, U17, and U19 levels.

== Career statistics ==
As of match played 23 December 2023

Appearances and goals by club, season and competition
Club	Season	League			KNVB Cup		Other		Total	
Club	Season	Division	Apps	Goals	Apps	Goals	Apps	Goals	Apps	Goals
Feyenoord	2015–16	Eredivisie	1	0	0	0	0	0	1	0
Willem II (loan)	2016–17	Eredivisie	11	3	0	0	0	0	11	3
NEC (loan)	2017–18	Eerste Divisie	18	2	1	0	0	0	3	1
Dordrecht (loan)	2018–19	Eerste Divisie	16	4	0	0	—		16	4
Dordrecht	2019–20 (Note: Season curtailed due to COVID-19 pandemic in the Netherlands)	Eerste Divisie	25	5	2	0	—		27	5
Dordrecht	2020–21	Eerste Divisie	29	2	0	0	—		29	2
Dordrecht	2021–22	Eerste Divisie	24	1	0	0	—		24	1
Dordrecht	2022–23	Eerste Divisie	34	0	1	0	—		35	0
Dordrecht	2023–24	Eerste Divisie	17	1	2	0	—		19	1
Dordrecht	Total		129	9	5	0	—		134	9
Career total			175	18	6	0	0	0	181	18

== Honours ==
=== Club ===
Feyenoord

- KNVB Cup: 2015–16
- Johan Cruyff Shield: 2018
