= Goran Lacković =

Croatian footballer and manager

Personal information
- Date of birth: 4 May 1970 (age 56)
- Place of birth: Zagreb, SFR Yugoslavia

Youth career
- Lokomotiva

Senior career*
Years	Team	Apps	(Gls)
- Lokomotiva
- Jugokoramika
- Trešnjevka
- Sesvete
- Špansko
- Trnje

Managerial career
- 2005–2007: Dinamo Zagreb Academy
- 2009–2010: Lučko
- 2010–2011: Radnik Sesvete
- 2011–2012: Croatia U21 (assistant)
- 2012–2013: Croatia U21 (assistant)
- 2013–2015: Croatia (assistant)
- 2020–2022: AS Monaco (assistant)
- 2022–Present: Bahrain (assistant)
- * Club domestic league appearances and goals

Goran Lacković (born 4 May 1970) is a retired Croatian footballer and was most recently assistant manager at AS Monaco

== Playing career ==
He played for Lokomotiva Zagreb in the Yugoslav third level Inter-Republic League. In the same league he also played for Jugokoramika Zaprešić. Then he played for four teams from Zagreb in Croatian Second Football League: Trešnjevka, Sesvete, Špansko and Trnje.

== Managerial career ==
After his playing career, he graduated from the Faculty of Kinesiology at University of Zagreb in 2000, attained a UEFA Pro coaching license and became a lecturer at the Football Academy of the Croatian Football Federation on UEFA A and UEFA B courses, and a leader and a lecturer on C course for trainers at the Zagreb regional football association. In addition to various coaching activities in the Zagreb regional football association and Football center of Zagreb, he was the youths' coach in Dinamo Zagreb Football Academy "Hitrec-Kacian" and coached the first team of NK Lučko and NK Radnik Sesvete with whom he won first place in Croatian Third Football League and won promotion to the Croatian Second Football League.

On two occasions, he was the assistant coach of the Croatia national under-21 football team, first at head coach Ivo Šušak's headquarters, then at head coach Niko Kovač's headquarters, with whom on 16 October 2013, along with Robert Kovač and Vatroslav Mihačić enters the newly established headquarters of the Croatian A team just before two successful decisive game of the playoffs with the Iceland national football team (0:0 and 2:0) to qualify for the 2014 FIFA World Cup in Brazil. After the World Cup in Brazil, the same headquarters began and led the qualifying for the UEFA Euro 2016 in France. In those qualifying national team played 8 games; 4 wins, 3 draw and 1 defeat, after which the Croatian Football Federation replaced Niko Kovač and his headquarters.

He was later, also alongside Mihačić and Robert Kovač, an assistant to head coach Niko Kovač at Ligue 1 side AS Monaco.
