= Vanishing spray =

Temporary marking substance

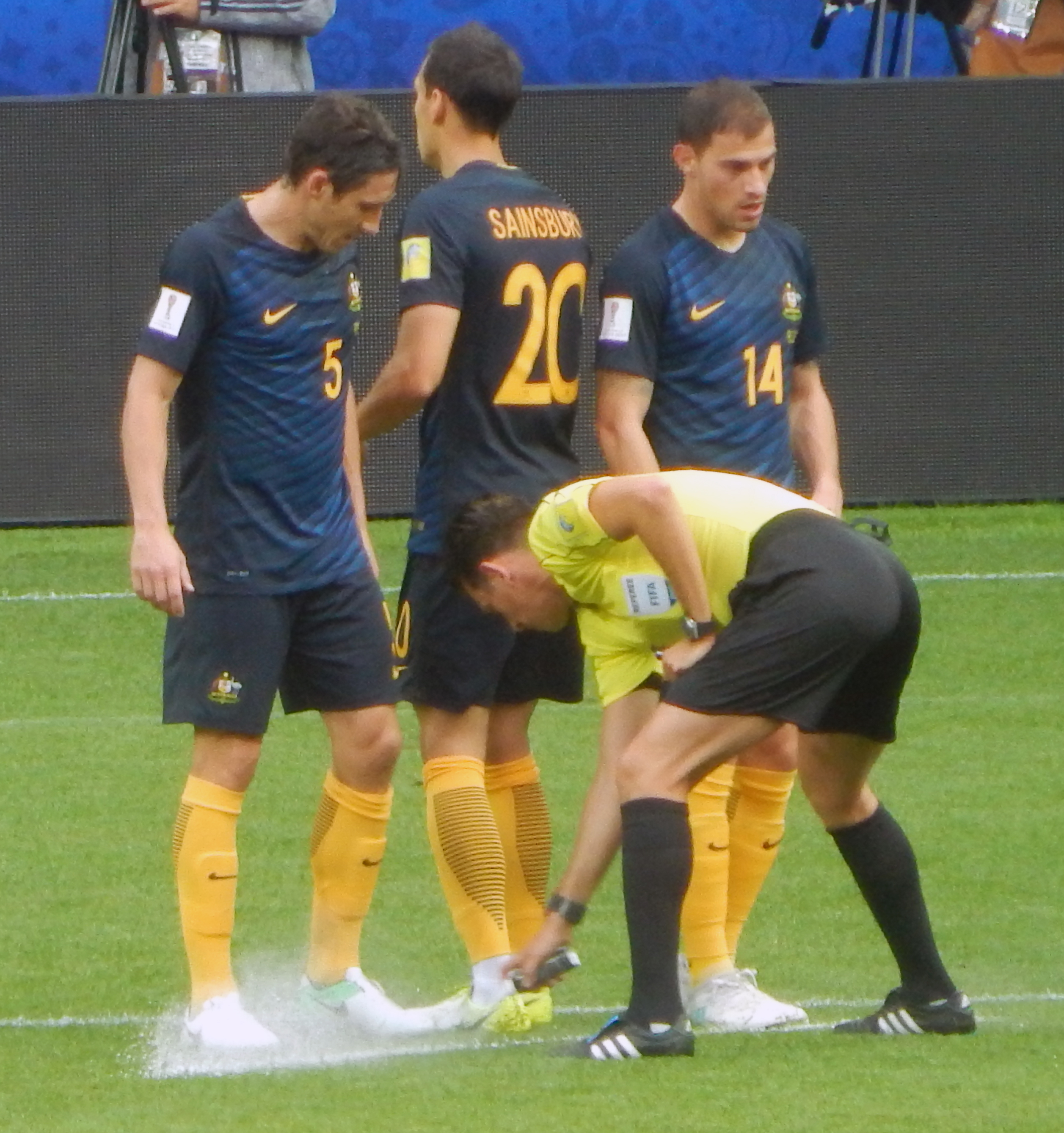
A referee applying vanishing spray before a free kick

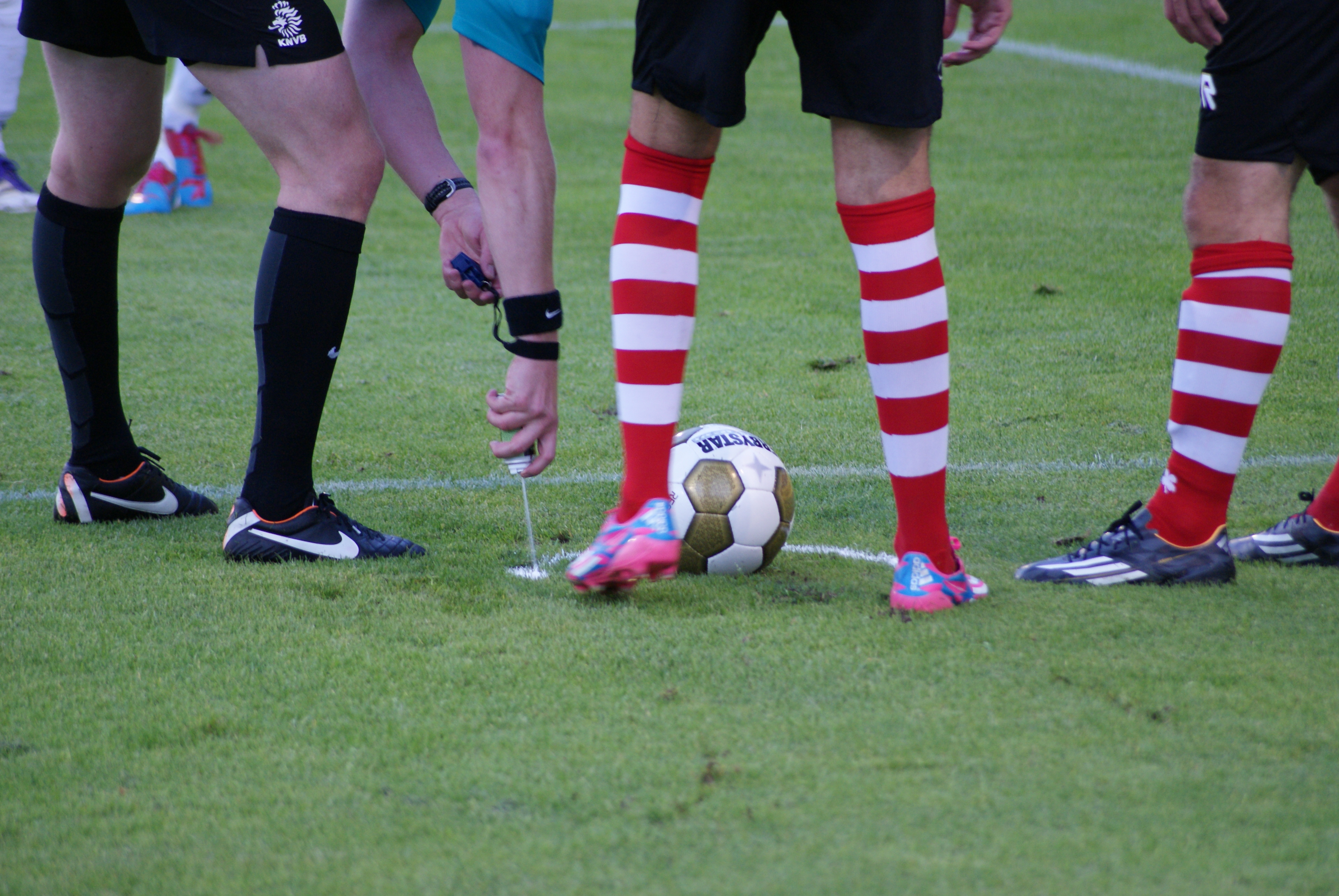
Vanishing spray used in the match between Achilles '29 and Sparta Rotterdam

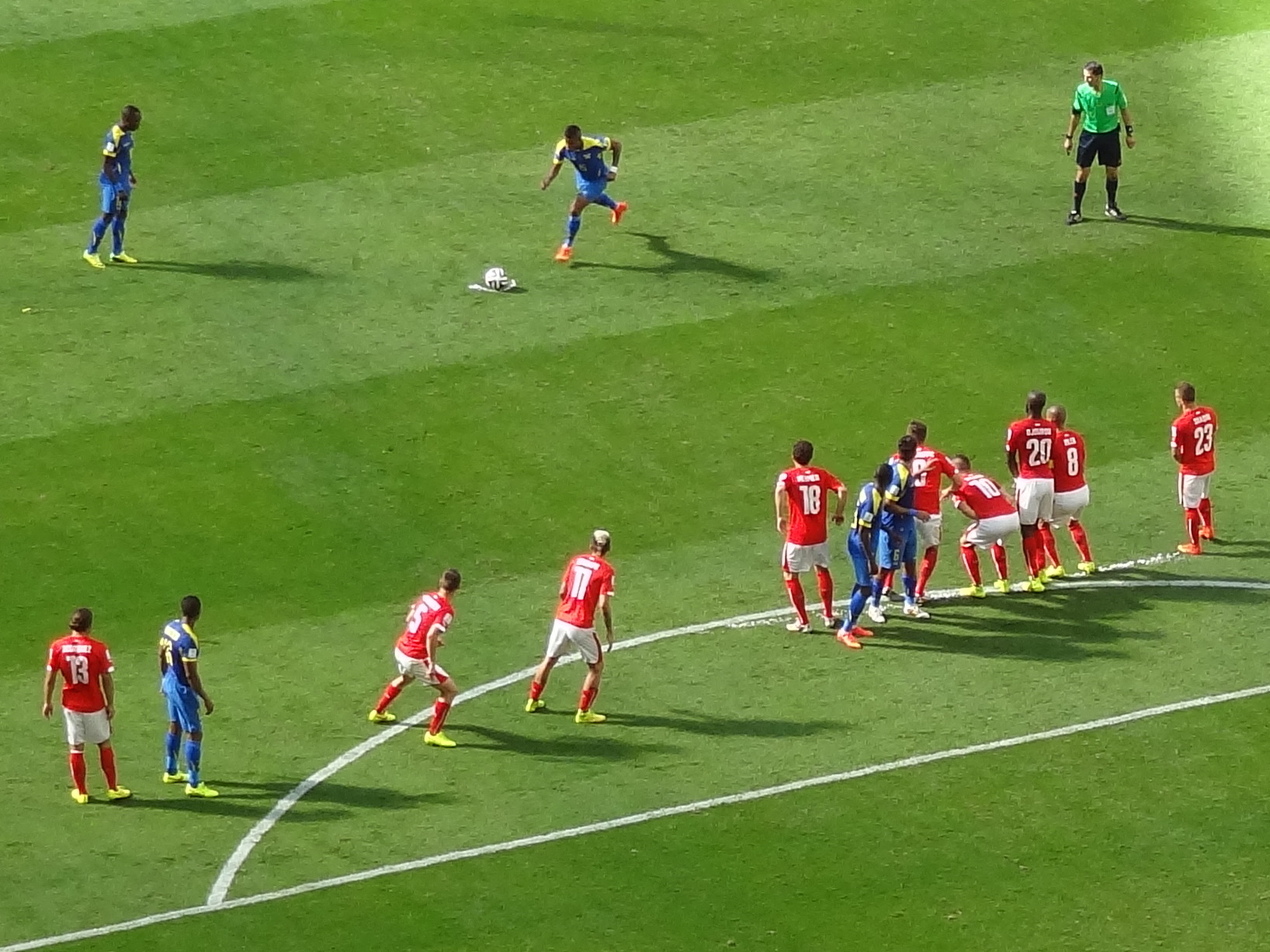
Vanishing spray in use at the 2014 FIFA World Cup

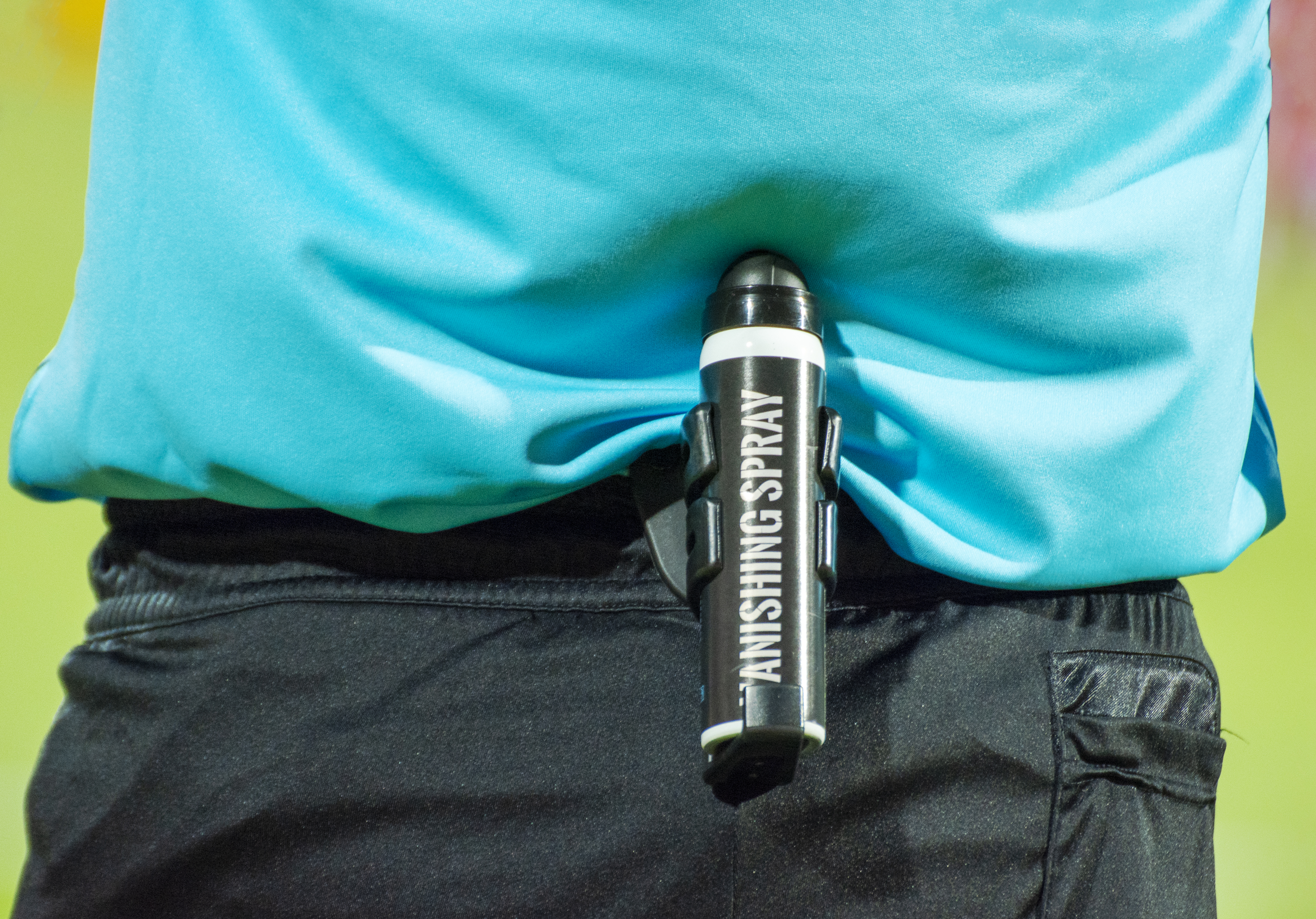
Vanishing spray can be clipped to a referee's waist

Vanishing spray, also known as vanishing foam, is a substance applied to an association football pitch in order to provide a temporary visual marker. It is most often used by the referee to indicate the minimum distance that the defending team may position themselves from the ball during a direct free kick, as well as to indicate the spot from where the kick is taken. The spray appears similar to white paint or watered-down shaving foam when initially applied. It completely disappears within a minute, leaving no visible residue behind.

Used mainly at the highest levels of competition, vanishing spray is said to help prevent unnecessary delays by preventing the defensive team from encroaching closer than the mandated 10 yards (9.15 meters) from the ball during a free kick, and also by preventing the attacking team from illegally moving the ball from the spot where the referee awarded the kick. Its use in football is not regulated by the Laws of the Game, with authorisation being in the hands of the governing body of a match, league, or tournament.

== Overview ==
Vanishing spray is applied from an aerosol can carried by the referee in a holster secured to their shorts. The referee has full discretion on whether or not to use vanishing spray, and opponents are required to retreat 10 yards from the spot of a free kick regardless of whether vanishing spray is used (unless the team awarded the kick elects to take a "quick" free kick with opponents still within 10 yards). It is generally only used when a free kick is awarded where a goal-scoring attempt is highly likely to develop (e.g. it is usually not used when a team is awarded a free kick in its own half of the pitch). When the referee chooses to use vanishing spray, they will usually mark the spot of the ball, then pace 10 yards in the direction of the attack, then spray a line marking that distance. Finally, the referee will indicate for the free kick to be taken, usually by blowing the whistle. The marks disappear after about one minute.

== Technical details ==
The can contains water (~80%), butane gas (~17%), surfactant (~1%), and other ingredients including vegetable oil (~2%). The liquefied butane expands when the product is ejected from the can. The butane evaporates instantly, forming bubbles of gas in the water/surfactant mixture. The surfactant(s) cause the bubbles to have stability and hence a gas-in-liquid colloid (foam) forms. The bubbles eventually collapse and the foam disappears, leaving only water and surfactant residue on the ground. More technical details can be found in the US patent applications for two of the commercial products available: Spuni (2001) and 9-15 (2010).

== History ==
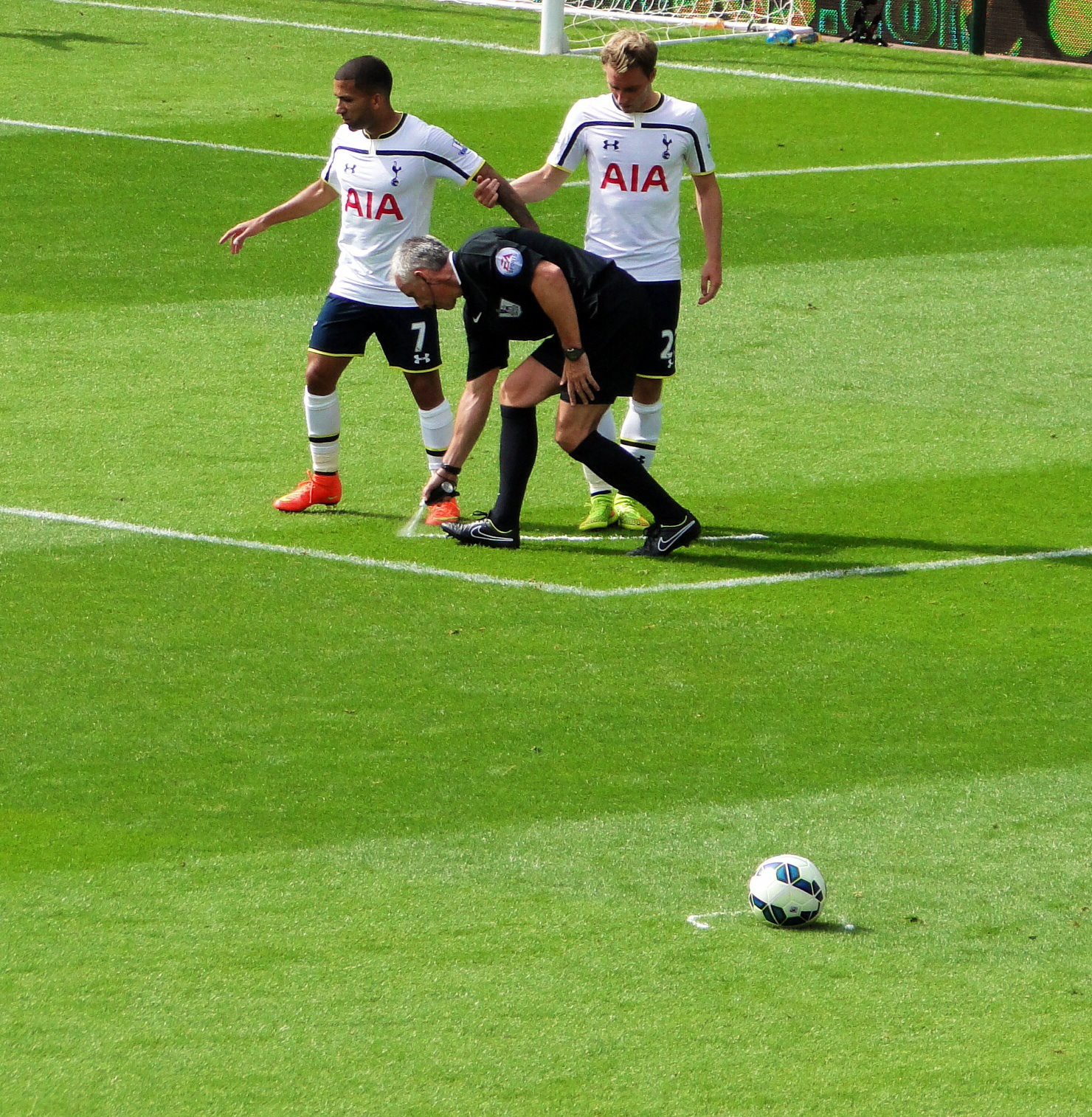
Referee Chris Foy uses the spray on the opening day of the 2014–15 Premier League season.

In 2000, Brazilian inventor Heine Allemagne developed the spray under the name "Spuni" (from espuma, the Portuguese word for foam). Its first use in a professional level was in the 2001 Brazilian Championship, Copa João Havelange. Referees unanimously approved its use and the spray was since adopted in Brazilian competitions. An international patent application for "Spuni" was filed by its inventor on March 31, 2000 and the patent granted on October 29, 2002. Since then, the spray has been used in many international football competitions. In June 2014 the spray's latest commercial version, "9-15", made its debut in the FIFA 2014 World Cup. "9-15" was developed by Argentinian entrepreneur Pablo Silva and its commercial production started in 2008.

In 2018, Allemagne publicly alleged that FIFA have not paid him for the spray, instead continuing to produce and use the spray without paying royalties. In December 2017, a Brazilian court acknowledged Allemagne's patent and ordered FIFA to stop using the spray in its competitions; FIFA have refused to comply, arguing that the Brazilian courts have no jurisdiction over them.

The 2011 Copa América tournament was the first tournament for national teams to use the spray. Its success caused it to be adopted by several national leagues in 2011 in America, including Major League Soccer. It has also been used in the 2013 FIFA U-20 World Cup in Turkey, the 2014 UEFA European Under-17 Championship in Malta and Gozo, and the 2014 FIFA World Cup in Brazil.

== Modern use ==
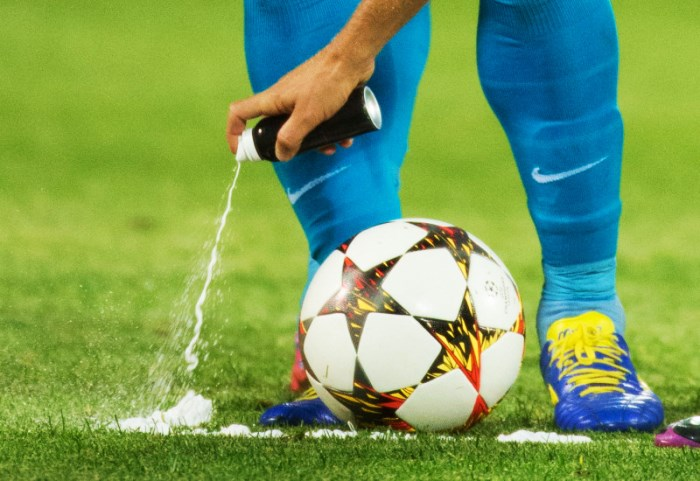
Referee seen spraying vanishing spray before a free kick.

The first World Cup match to feature the vanishing spray was the opening game of the 2014 FIFA World Cup between Brazil and Croatia on 12 June, used by referee Yuichi Nishimura. The spray is now authorised for use in top flight football for the Bundesliga in Germany (though Germany's consumer protection agency, TÜV, initially banned it due to environmental concerns), Serie A in Italy, Ligue 1 in France, La Liga in Spain, the Premier League in England, Major League Soccer in the United States of America and Canada, the Iran Pro League, the Czech First League, the Hong Kong Premier League, the A-League in Australia, the Thai Premier League, the Primeira Liga in Portugal, the Ekstraklasa in Poland, the Danish Superliga, the Indian Super League, the J-League in Japan, and the V.League 1 in Vietnam.
