= Jan Kokla =

Estonian footballer

Personal information
- Full name: Jan Kokla
- Date of birth: 29 May 1997 (age 29)
- Place of birth: Tallinn, Estonia
- Height: 1.87 m (6 ft 1 1/2 in)
- Position: Defensive midfielder

Youth career
- 2007–2008: Oper Academy
- 2009–2013: Nõmme United

Senior career*
Years	Team	Apps	(Gls)
2013	Nõmme United	19	(6)
2014–2016	Flora U21	51	(3)
2015–2017	Flora	21	(0)
Total		91	(9)

International career
2012	Estonia U16	2	(0)
2012–2013	Estonia U17	9	(1)
2014	Estonia U18	2	(0)
2014–2015	Estonia U19	11	(1)
2015–2016	Estonia U21	6	(1)
2016	Estonia	1	(0)
- * Club domestic league appearances and goals

Jan Kokla (born 29 May 1997) is an Estonian former professional footballer who played as a defensive midfielder.

== Club career ==
Kokla started playing football with Andres Oper's Academy before moving to Nõmme United. In 2014, he signed for Meistriliiga club Flora, spending the 2014 season in the reserve team Flora II. Kokla made his debut in the Meistriliiga on 13 July 2015, in a 4–0 away win against Tulevik, playing the full 90 minutes and picking up a yellow card. He retired from football in 2017 due to mononucleosis.

== International career ==
Kokla started his international youth career in 2012 with the Estonia U16 team and has captained the Estonia U19 team. He earned his first senior cap for Estonia on 1 June 2016, in a 2–0 friendly home win against Andorra, making a good first impression by producing an assist to opening goal scored by Dmitri Kruglov.

== Honours ==
=== Club ===
Flora

- Estonian Cup: 2015–16
- Estonian Supercup: 2016
