= Roberto Alves (footballer) =

Swiss footballer

Personal information
- Full name: Roberto Emanuel Oliveira Alves
- Date of birth: 8 June 1997 (age 29)
- Place of birth: Wetzikon, Switzerland
- Height: 1.80 m (5 ft 11 in)
- Position: Midfielder

Team information
- Current team: Radomiak Radom
- Number: 10

Youth career
- Gossau
- Hinwil
- –2015: Grasshoppers

Senior career*
Years	Team	Apps	(Gls)
2015–2020	Grasshoppers	9	(1)
2017–2018	→ FC Wil (loan)	16	(2)
2018–2019	→ FC Winterthur (loan)	33	(6)
2020–2022	FC Winterthur	75	(18)
2022–	Radomiak Radom	98	(9)

International career
2012–2013	Switzerland U16	5	(3)
2013–2014	Switzerland U17	11	(5)
2014–2015	Switzerland U18	8	(3)
2015–2016	Switzerland U19	6	(1)
2017	Switzerland U20	3	(1)
- * Club domestic league appearances and goals as of 21:18, 25 October 2026 (UTC)

Roberto Emanuel Oliveira Alves (born 8 June 1997) is a Swiss professional footballer who plays as a midfielder for Ekstraklasa club Radomiak Radom.

== Early life ==
Alves was born in 1997 in Wetzikon, Switzerland, to Portuguese immigrants.

== Club career ==
In 2019, Alves signed for Swiss second-tier side FC Winterthur, helping them earn promotion to the Swiss top flight. In 2022, he signed for Polish side Radomiak Radom.

== International career ==
Alves has represented Switzerland internationally at youth level and is eligible to represent Portugal internationally through his parents.

== Style of play ==
Alves mainly operates as an attacking midfielder and is known for his ability to create goalscoring opportunities.

== Personal life ==
Alves has regarded Portugal international Cristiano Ronaldo as one of football idols. He has a brother.
