= Karlo Plantak =

Croatian footballer (born 1997)

Personal information
- Date of birth: 11 November 1997 (age 28)
- Place of birth: Zagreb, Croatia
- Height: 1.80 m (5 ft 11 in)
- Position: Midfielder

Team information
- Current team: Politehnica Timișoara
- Number: 19

Youth career
- –2016: Dinamo Zagreb

Senior career*
Years	Team	Apps	(Gls)
2016–2019	Dinamo Zagreb II	52	(1)
2019	Slaven Belupo	13	(1)
2019–2020	Celje	24	(0)
2020–2022	Kustošija	32	(0)
2022	Alumnij	10	(0)
2022–	Politehnica Timișoara	5	(0)

International career
2012	Croatia U16	5	(0)
2013	Croatia U17	7	(0)
2014	Croatia U18	1	(0)
2015–2016	Croatia U19	11	(1)
- * Club domestic league appearances and goals as of 18 September 2022

Karlo Plantak (born 11 November 1997) is a Croatian professional footballer who plays as a midfielder for SSU Politehnica Timișoara.

== Honours ==
Celje

- Slovenian PrvaLiga: 2019–20
