= Dani van der Moot =

Dutch footballer (born 1997)

Personal information
- Full name: Dani van der Moot
- Date of birth: 7 March 1997 (age 29)
- Place of birth: Zaandam, Netherlands
- Height: 1.85 m (6 ft 1 in)
- Position: Forward

Team information
- Current team: Rijnsburgse Boys
- Number: 9

Youth career
- Hellas
- –2008: Volendam
- 2008–2012: AZ
- 2012–2014: PSV

Senior career*
Years	Team	Apps	(Gls)
2014–2016	PSV	0	(0)
2014–2018	Jong PSV	14	(1)
2016–2017	→ Jong Utrecht (loan)	27	(3)
2019	Jong Volendam	15	(20)
2019	Volendam	8	(1)
2019–	Rijnsburgse Boys	120	(52)

International career
2012	Netherlands U15	4	(0)
2012–2013	Netherlands U16	9	(6)
2013–2014	Netherlands U17	14	(5)
- * Club domestic league appearances and goals as of 06:48, 21 April 2024 (UTC)

Dani van der Moot (born 7 March 1997) is a Dutch footballer who plays as a forward for Rijnsburgse Boys in the Tweede Divisie.

== Career ==
Born in Zaandam, van der Moot started his youth career with Hellas Sport Combinatie. He then played with FC Volendam and AZ Alkmaar, before joining PSV Eindhoven in 2012. He made his professional debut as Jong PSV player in the second division on 19 December 2014 against SC Telstar. He replaced Elvio van Overbeek after 62 minutes in a 1–1 home draw.

On 15 January 2019, van der Moot joined FC Volendam, which he also played for as a youth player. He left the club on 2 September 2019 to join Tweede Divisie club Rijnsburgse Boys. He made his debut for the club on 7 September 2019 in a 0–1 loss to VV Noordwijk, coming on as a substitute for Edo Knol in the 66th minute. On 28 September, he scored his first goals – a hat-trick – in a 5–2 away win over SVV Scheveningen.
