= List of Croatia international footballers =

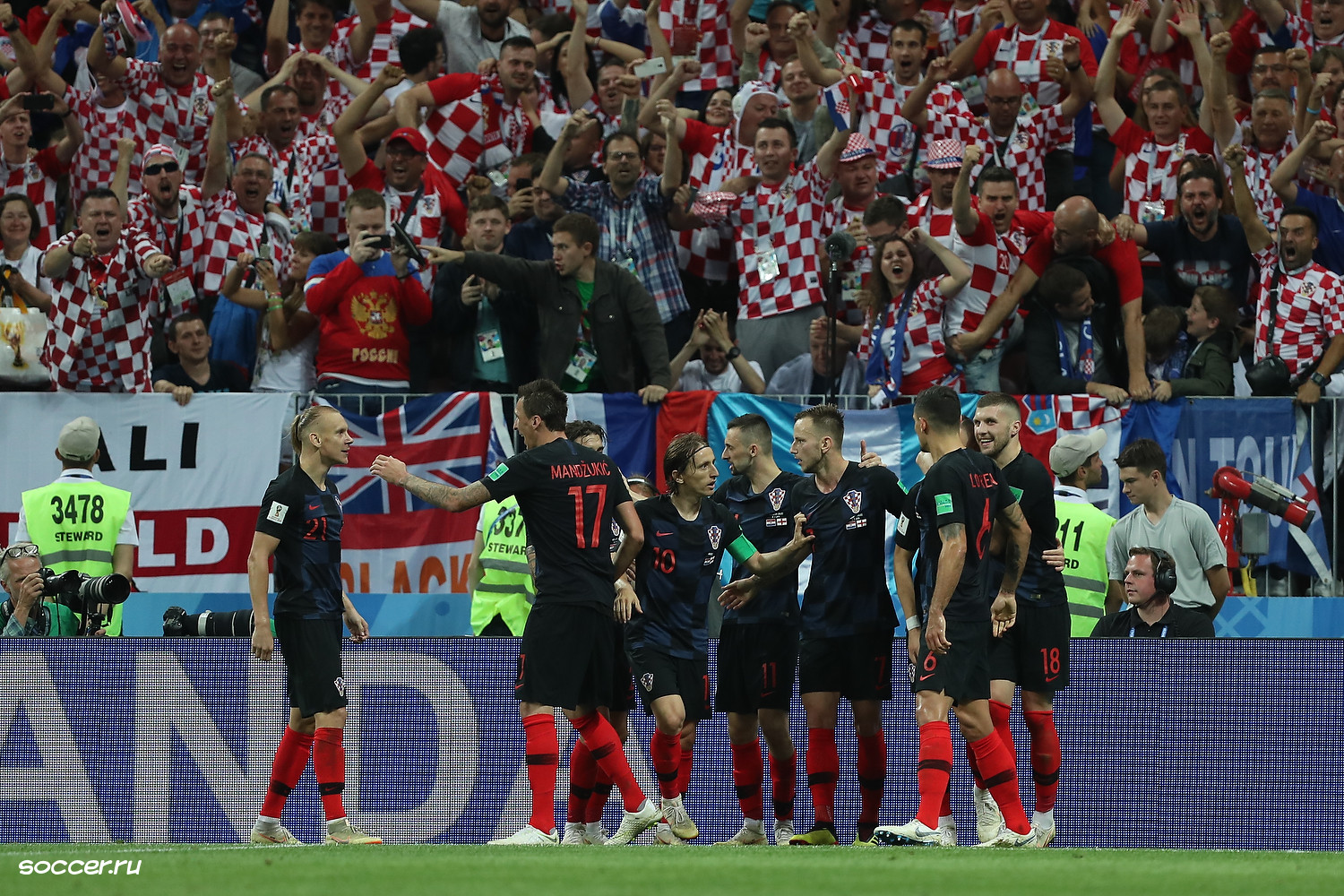
Croatian footballers, supporters, and staff during the 2018 FIFA World Cup

This list includes players for the Croatia national football team following the independence of Croatia, with prior history stretching back to the late 19th century. Active since 2006, Croatian midfielder Luka Modrić is the nation's most capped player, one of the world's few players with 200 or more caps. Modrić is the most decorated Croatian player in the history of football with 34 major trophies. Playing between 1990–2002, Croatian forward Davor Šuker has the all-time goal-scoring record for Croatia, with 45 international goals in 68 matches.

== Players ==
This list is about Croatia national football team players with at least 20 appearances. There is a separate list of footballers born outside of Croatia who played for the national team. For a list of all national team players with a Wikipedia article, see the Croatia international footballers category. For the current national team squad, see current squad.

Appearances and goals are composed of FIFA World Cup and UEFA European Championship and each competition's required qualification matches, as well as the UEFA Nations League and international friendlies. Players are listed by number of caps, then by goals scored. If they are still tied the players are listed alphabetically. Statistics correct as of 6 October 2026 and the UEFA Nations League match against Spain.

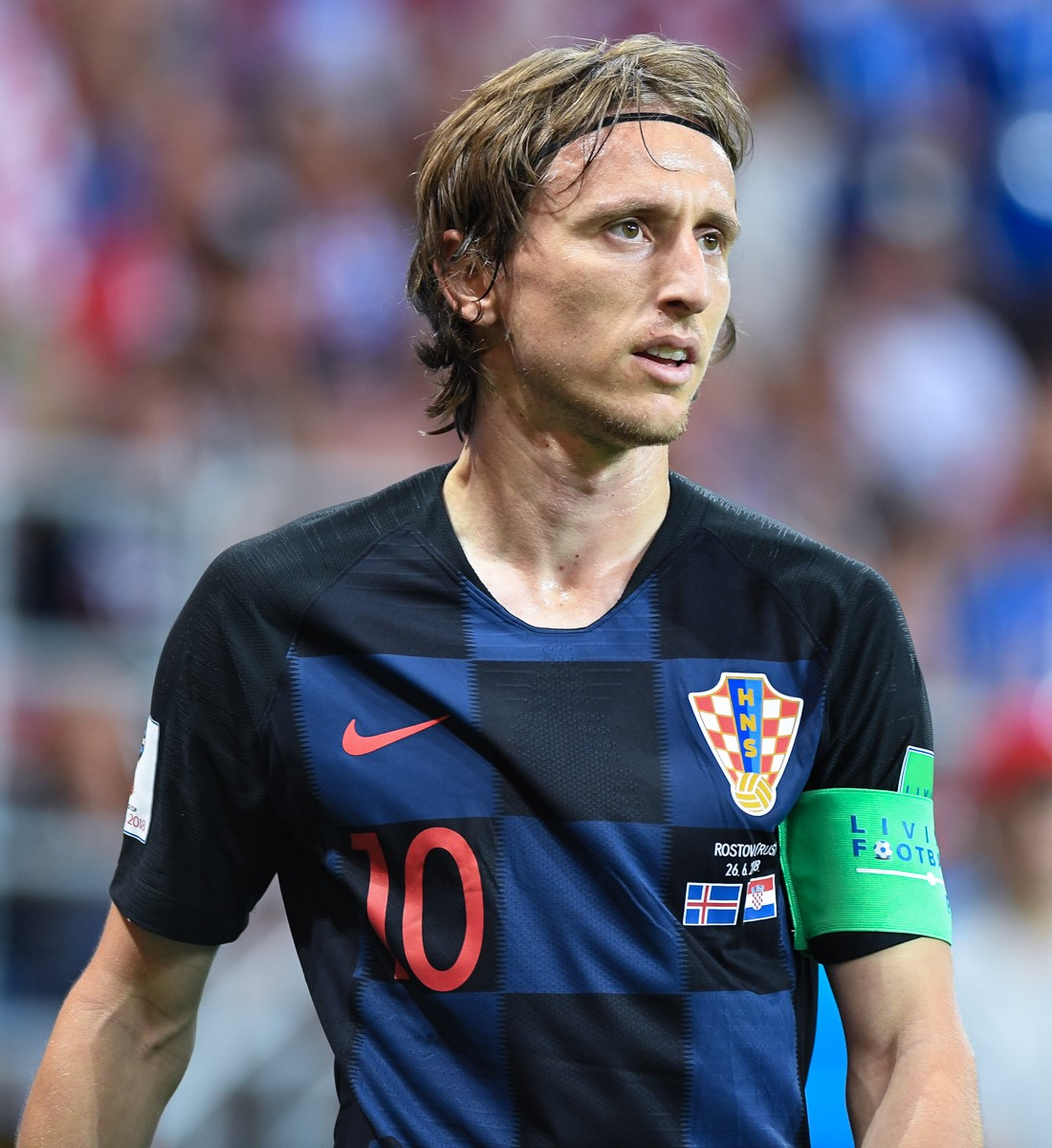
Current Croatia captain, Luka Modrić (206 caps, 30 goals) is the most-capped player.

Key
§	Still active for the national team (Note: Players considered active are the ones who have been called up for the national team in the last 12 months. Excludes players that have officially announced their retirement from the national team.)
*	Still playing active football
GK	Goalkeeper
DF	Defender
MF	Midfielder
FW	Forward

Croatia national team football players with at least 20 appearances
#	Name	Position	National team career	Caps	Goals	FIFA World Cup (Note: Years in brackets indicate that the player was part of the squad but did not play in any matches.)	UEFA Euro	UEFA Nations League	Ref
1	Luka Modrić^{§}	MF	2006–	206	30	2006, 2014, 2018 (silver) , 2022 (bronze) , 2026	2008, 2012, 2016, 2020, 2024	2023 (silver)	
2	Ivan Perišić^{§}	FW	2011–	162	40	2014, 2018 (silver) , 2022 (bronze) , 2026	2012, 2016, 2020, 2024	2023 (silver)	
3	Darijo Srna	DF	2002–2016	134	22	2006, 2014	2004, 2008, 2012, 2016	–	
4	Mateo Kovačić^{§}	MF	2013–	121	5	2014, 2018 (silver) , 2022 (bronze) , 2026	2016, 2020, 2024	2023 (silver)	
5	Andrej Kramarić^{§}	FW	2014–	119	36	2018 (silver) , 2022 (bronze) , 2026	2016, 2020, 2024	2023 (silver)	
6	Stipe Pletikosa	GK	1999–2014	114	0	2002, 2006, 2014	2008, 2012	–	
7	Ivan Rakitić	MF	2007–2019	106	15	2014, 2018 (silver)	2008, 2012, 2016	–	
8	Domagoj Vida *	DF	2010–2024	105	4	(2014), 2018 (silver) , (2022) (bronze)	2012, 2016, 2020, (2024)	2023 (silver)	
8	Josip Šimunić	DF	2001–2013	105	3	2002, 2006	2004, 2008, (2012)	–	
10	Ivica Olić	FW	2002–2015	104	20	2002, 2006, 2014	2004, 2008	–	
11	Vedran Ćorluka	DF	2006–2018	103	4	2014, 2018 (silver)	2008, 2012, 2016	–	
12	Dario Šimić	DF	1996–2008	100	3	1998 (bronze) , 2002, 2006	1996, 2004, 2008	–	
13	Marcelo Brozović *	MF	2014–2024	99	7	2014, 2018 (silver) , 2022 (bronze)	2016, 2020, 2024	2023 (silver)	
14	Mario Pašalić^{§}	MF	2014–	93	12	2022 (bronze) , 2026	2020, 2024	2023 (silver)	
15	Mario Mandžukić	FW	2007–2018	89	33	2014, 2018 (silver)	2012, 2016	–	
16	Robert Kovač	DF	1999–2009	84	0	2002, 2006	2004, 2008	–	
17	Niko Kovač	MF	1996–2008	83	14	2002, 2006	2004, 2008	–	
17	Dominik Livaković^{§}	GK	2017–	83	0	(2018) (silver) , 2022 (bronze) , 2026	2020, 2024	2023 (silver)	
19	Niko Kranjčar	MF	2004–2013	81	16	2006	2008, 2012	–	
19	Robert Jarni	MF	1990–2002	81	1	1998 (bronze) , 2002	1996	–	
21	Dejan Lovren *	DF	2009–2022	78	5	2014, 2018 (silver) , 2022 (bronze)	2020	–	
22	Nikola Vlašić^{§}	MF	2017–	69	11	2022 (bronze) , 2026	2020, (2024)	2023 (silver)	
23	Davor Šuker	FW	1990–2002	68	45	1998 (bronze) , 2002	1996	–	
24	Eduardo da Silva	FW	2004–2014	64	29	2014	2012	–	
25	Aljoša Asanović	MF	1990–2000	62	3	1998 (bronze)	1996	–	
26	Zvonimir Soldo	DF	1994–2002	61	3	1998 (bronze) , 2002	1996	–	
27	Jerko Leko	MF	2002–2009	59	2	2006	2004, 2008	–	
27	Dražen Ladić	GK	1990–2000	59	0	1998 (bronze)	1996	–	
29	Danijel Pranjić	MF	2004–2015	58	1	2014	2008, 2012	–	
30	Joško Gvardiol^{§}	DF	2021–	56	4	2022 (bronze) , 2026	2020, 2024	–	
31	Ognjen Vukojević	MF	2007–2014	55	4	(2014)	2008, 2012	–	
31	Igor Tudor	DF	1997–2006	55	3	1998 (bronze) , 2006	2004	–	
31	Milan Badelj	MF	2010–2021	55	2	(2014), 2018 (silver)	(2012), 2016, (2020)	–	
34	Igor Štimac	DF	1990–2002	53	2	1998 (bronze)	1996	–	
35	Šime Vrsaljko	DF	2011–2022	52	0	2014, 2018 (silver)	(2012), 2016, 2020	–	
36	Goran Vlaović	FW	1992–2002	51	15	1998 (bronze) , (2002)	1996	–	
36	Zvonimir Boban	MF	1990–1999	51	12	1998 (bronze)	1996	–	
38	Robert Prosinečki	MF	1994–2002	49	10	1998 (bronze) , 2002	1996	–	
38	Mario Stanić	MF	1995–2003	49	7	1998 (bronze) , 2002	1996	–	
38	Milan Rapaić	MF	1994–2007	49	6	2002	2004	–	
38	Marko Babić	MF	2002–2008	49	3	2006	(2004)	–	
38	Stjepan Tomas	DF	1998–2006	49	1	2002, 2006	(2004)	–	
38	Ivan Strinić	DF	2010–2018	49	0	2018 (silver)	2012, 2016	–	
44	Mladen Petrić	FW	2001–2013	45	13	–	2008	–	
45	Slaven Bilić	DF	1992–1999	44	3	1998 (bronze)	1996	–	
45	Danijel Subašić	GK	2009–2018	44	0	(2014), 2018 (silver)	(2012), 2016	–	
47	Ante Budimir^{§}	FW	2020–	43	7	2022 (bronze) , 2026	2020, 2024	–	
48	Nikola Kalinić	FW	2008–2018	42	15	(2018) (silver)	2008, (2012), 2016	–	
48	Bruno Petković *	FW	2019–2024	42	11	2022 (bronze)	2020, 2024	2023 (silver)	
48	Ante Rebić *	FW	2013–2021	42	3	2014, 2018 (silver)	2020	–	
51	Ivan Klasnić	FW	2004–2011	41	12	2006	(2004), 2008	–	
52	Alen Bokšić	FW	1993–2002	40	10	2002	1996	–	
52	Josip Juranović^{§}	DF	2017–	40	0	2022 (bronze)	2020, 2024	2023 (silver)	
52	Josip Šutalo^{§}	DF	2022–	40	0	2022 (bronze) , 2026	2024	2023 (silver)	
55	Boris Živković	DF	1999–2007	39	2	2002	2004	–	
56	Lovro Majer^{§}	MF	2017–	38	9	2022 (bronze)	2024	2023 (silver)	
56	Duje Ćaleta-Car^{§}	DF	2018–	38	1	2018 (silver) , (2026)	2020	–	
56	Josip Stanišić^{§}	DF	2021–	38	0	2022 (bronze) , 2026	2024	2023 (silver)	
59	Nikica Jelavić	FW	2009–2014	36	6	2014	2012	–	
60	Boško Balaban	FW	2000–2007	35	10	(2002), (2006)	–	–	
60	Josip Brekalo *	MF	2018–2023	35	4	–	2020	–	
60	Borna Barišić *	DF	2017–2023	35	1	2022 (bronze)	2020	2023 (silver)	
63	Dado Pršo	FW	2003–2006	32	9	2006	2004	–	
64	Nikola Jerkan	DF	1992–1997	31	1	–	1996	–	
65	Daniel Šarić	DF	1997–2002	30	0	2002	–	–	
66	Gordon Schildenfeld	DF	2009–2016	29	1	(2014)	2012, 2016	–	
67	Davor Vugrinec	FW	1996–2006	28	7	2002	–	–	
67	Mislav Oršić^{§}	FW	2019–	28	2	2022 (bronze)	2020	–	
67	Marko Pjaca *	MF	2014–2024	28	1	2018 (silver)	2016, (2024)	–	
67	Tomislav Butina	GK	2001–2006	28	0	(2002), (2006)	2004	–	
67	Mario Tokić	DF	1998–2006	28	0	(2006)	(2004)	–	
72	Igor Cvitanović	FW	1992–1999	27	4	–	(1996)	–	
72	Borna Sosa	DF	2021–	27	2	2022 (bronze)	2024	(2023) (silver)	
74	Tin Jedvaj *	DF	2014–2020	26	2	2018 (silver)	2016	–	
74	Josip Pivarić	DF	2013–2018	26	0	2018 (silver)	–	–	
74	Jurica Vranješ	MF	1999–2007	26	0	2002, (2006)	–	–	
77	Martin Baturina^{§}	MF	2023–	25	2	2026	2024	–	
77	Petar Sučić^{§}	MF	2024–	25	2	2026	–	–	
79	Marin Pongračić^{§}	DF	2020–	24	0	2026	2024	2023 (silver)	
80	Luka Sučić^{§}	MF	2021–	23	1	2026	2024	2023 (silver)	
81	Luka Ivanušec *	MF	2017–2024	22	2	–	2020, 2024	2023 (silver)	
81	Ivica Mornar	FW	1994–2004	22	1	–	2004	–	
81	Dubravko Pavličić	DF	1992–1997	22	0	–	1996	–	
81	Vedran Runje	GK	2006–2011	22	0	–	2008	–	
85	Marko Livaja *	FW	2018–2023	21	4	2022 (bronze)	–	–	
85	Krunoslav Jurčić	MF	1997–2000	21	0	1998 (bronze)	–	–	
85	Marko Rog *	MF	2014–2020	21	0	–	2016	–	
86	Marco Pašalić^{§}	FW	2025–	20	2	2026	–	–	

== Captains ==
Captaincies are composed of FIFA World Cup and UEFA European Championship and each competition's required qualification matches, as well as international friendlies. Players are listed by number of appearances as captain, then by chronological order of first captaincy. Only matches player started as a captain are counted. Statistics correct as of 6 October 2026 and the UEFA Nations League match against Spain.

#	Name	National team career	Caps as captain	Total caps	First captaincy
1	Luka Modrić	2006–	100	206	3 September 2015
2	Darijo Srna	2002–2016	68	134	11 February 2009
3	Zvonimir Boban	1990–1999	48	51	22 October 1992
4	Niko Kovač	1996–2008	43	83	18 August 2004
5	Boris Živković	1999–2007	18	39	20 November 2002
6	Davor Šuker	1990–2002	17	69	23 March 1994
6	Robert Jarni	1990–2002	17	81	18 May 1994
8	Ivan Perišić	2011–	9	162	28 March 2017
9	Dario Šimić	1996–2008	8	100	7 September 2002
9	Domagoj Vida	2010–2024	8	105	15 October 2018
11	Robert Kovač	1999–2009	6	84	3 June 2006
12	Vedran Ćorluka	2006–2018	5	103	25 May 2012
13	Dražen Ladić	1990–2000	3	59	5 July 1992
13	Igor Cvitanović	1992–1999	3	27	16 June 1999
13	Josip Šimunić	2001–2013	3	105	15 October 2008
13	Mario Mandžukić	2007–2018	3	89	7 June 2015
13	Mateo Kovačić	2013–	3	121	3 June 2022
18	Zlatko Kranjčar	1990	2	2	17 October 1990
18	Nikola Jerkan	1992–1997	2	31	11 December 1996
18	Aljoša Asanović	1990–2000	2	62	8 June 1997
18	Mario Tokić	1998–2006	2	28	29 January 2006
18	Ivan Rakitić	2007–2019	2	106	26 May 2010
18	Josip Pivarić	2013–2018	2	25	11 January 2017
24	Srećko Bogdan	1990–1991	1	2	19 June 1991
24	Dubravko Pavličić	1992–1997	1	22	12 July 1992
24	Igor Štimac	1990–2002	1	53	29 March 1996
24	Robert Prosinečki	1994–2002	1	49	12 June 1997
24	Zvonimir Soldo	1994–2002	1	61	10 November 2001
24	Goran Vlaović	1992–2002	1	51	21 August 2002
24	Stipe Pletikosa	1999–2014	1	114	9 February 2003
24	Igor Tudor	1997–2006	1	55	12 October 2005
24	Šime Vrsaljko	2011–2022	1	52	12 November 2014
24	Duje Čop	2014–2018	1	14	27 May 2017
24	Marcelo Brozović	2014–2024	1	99	10 June 2022
24	Dejan Lovren	2009–2022	1	78	16 November 2022
24	Andrej Kramarić	2014–	1	119	5 September 2025

== See also ==
- List of men's footballers with 100 or more international caps
