= Association football positions =

Player roles in association football

The most common positions used in association football. Teams must always have a goalkeeper, but the remaining 10 players may be arranged in any combination.

In the sport of association football, each of the 11 players on a team is assigned to a particular position on the field of play. A team is made up of one goalkeeper and ten outfield players who fill various defensive, midfield, and attacking positions depending on the formation deployed. These positions describe both the player's main role and their area of operation on the pitch.

In the early development of the game, formations were much more offensively aggressive, with the 1–2–7 being prominent in the late 1800s. In the latter part of the 19th century, the 2–3–5 formation became widely used and the position names became more refined to reflect this. In defence, there were full-backs, known as the left-back and right-back; in midfield, left-half, centre-half and right-half; and for the forward line there were outside-left (or left wing), inside-left, centre-forward, inside-right and outside-right (or right wing). As the game has evolved, tactics and team formations have changed and so many of the names of the positions have changed to reflect their duties in the modern game (though some old familiar ones remain). The term "half-back" fell out of use by the early 1970s and "midfield" was used in naming the positions that play around the middle third as in centre midfield and wide midfield.

The fluid nature of the modern game means that positions in football are not as rigidly defined as in sports such as rugby or American football. Even so, most players will play in a limited range of positions throughout their career, as each position requires a particular set of skills and physical attributes. Footballers who are able to play comfortably in a number of positions are referred to as "utility players".

However, in Total Football tactics, the players are only loosely defined into a position. This tactic required players who were extremely versatile, such as Johan Cruyff, who could play every position on the pitch apart from goalkeeper.

== Goalkeeper ==
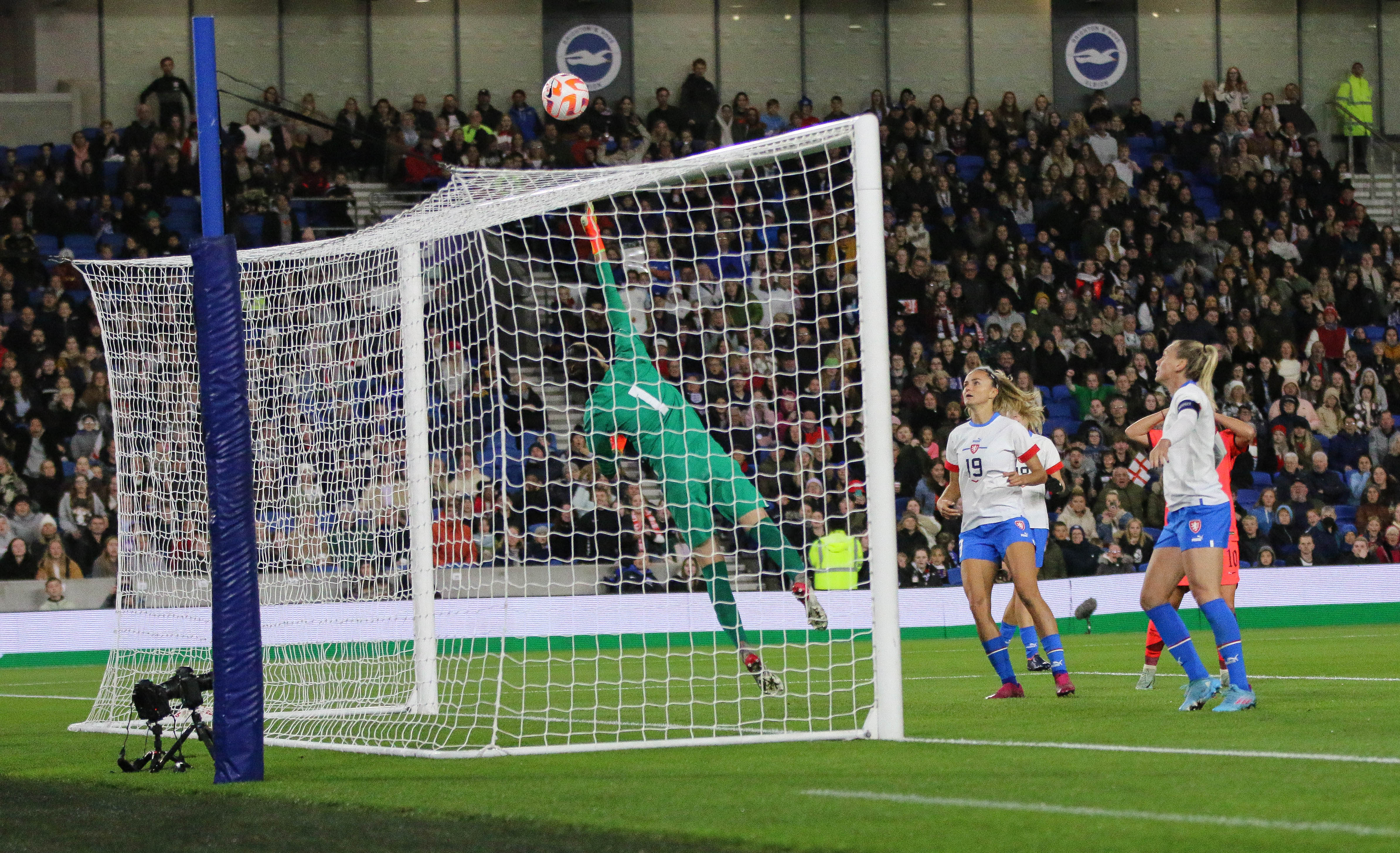
Goalkeeper diving to keep the ball away from goal.

Goalkeeper is the most defensive position in football. The goalkeeper's main job is to stop the other team from scoring by catching, palming or punching the ball from shots, headers and crosses. Unlike their teammates, goalkeepers typically remain in and around their own penalty area for most of the game. As a result, goalkeepers have a better view of the pitch and often give advice to their defence when the other team is on the attack or during set pieces. Goalkeepers are the only players on the pitch who are allowed to handle the ball, but this is restricted to their own penalty area. Positioning is another important job and is one of the hardest to master as keeper.

Goalkeepers must also wear a different coloured kit from the outfielders and officials. Common colours include yellow, green, grey, black and shades of blue. Since the 1970s, goalkeepers have also typically worn specialised gloves. They provide better grip on the ball and protect their hands from hard shots and headers, as well making it easier to punch or push the ball away. Caps were common between the 1910s and 1960s, as well as woolly jumpers, but these are not worn in any professional or semi-professional context today.

Unlike other positions, the goalkeeper is the only required role in a football match. If a goalkeeper gets sent off or injured, a substitute goalkeeper or outfielder (who must wear the goalkeeper's shirt) must take their place in goal.

=== Sweeper-keeper ===
With the advent of the offside rule, the role of a sweeping defender has largely become obsolete. However, in the last decade it has become popular for goalkeepers to take on that role instead. A sweeping goalkeeper is good at reading the game, and prevents scoring opportunities by coming off their line to challenge and/or distract opposing forwards who have beaten the offside trap. Manuel Neuer has often been described as a sweeper-keeper.

== Defender ==
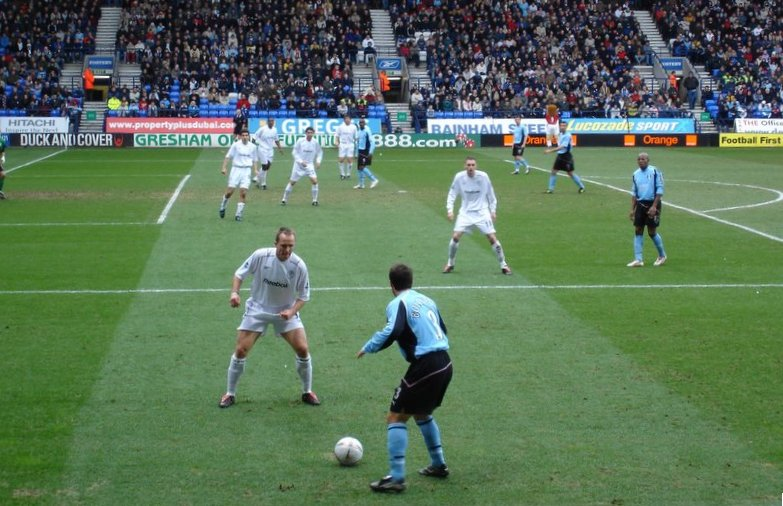
A defender (in the foreground, wearing a white shirt) challenging for possession.

Defenders play behind the midfielders and their primary responsibility is to provide support to the team and to prevent the opposition from scoring a goal. They usually remain in the half of the field that contains the goal they are defending. Taller defenders will move forward to the opposing team's penalty box when their team takes corner kicks or free kicks, where scoring with one's head is a possibility.

=== Centre-back ===
The principal role of the centre-back, (central defenderor centre-half) is to block the opponent's players from scoring, and safely clearing the ball from the defensive half's penalty area. As their name suggests, they play in a central position. Most teams employ two centre-backs, stationed in front of the goalkeeper. There are two main defensive strategies used by centre-backs: the zonal defence, where each centre-back covers a specific area of the pitch, and man-to-man marking, where each centre-back has the job of covering a particular opposition player.

Centre-backs are often tall, strong and have good jumping, heading and tackling ability. Successful centre-backs also need to be able to concentrate, read the game well, and be brave and decisive in making last-ditch tackles on attacking players who might otherwise be through on goal. Sometimes, particularly in lower leagues, centre-backs concentrate less on ball control and passing, preferring simply to clear the ball in a "safety-first" fashion. However, there is a tradition of centre-backs having more than just rudimentary footballing skill, enabling a more possession-oriented playing style.

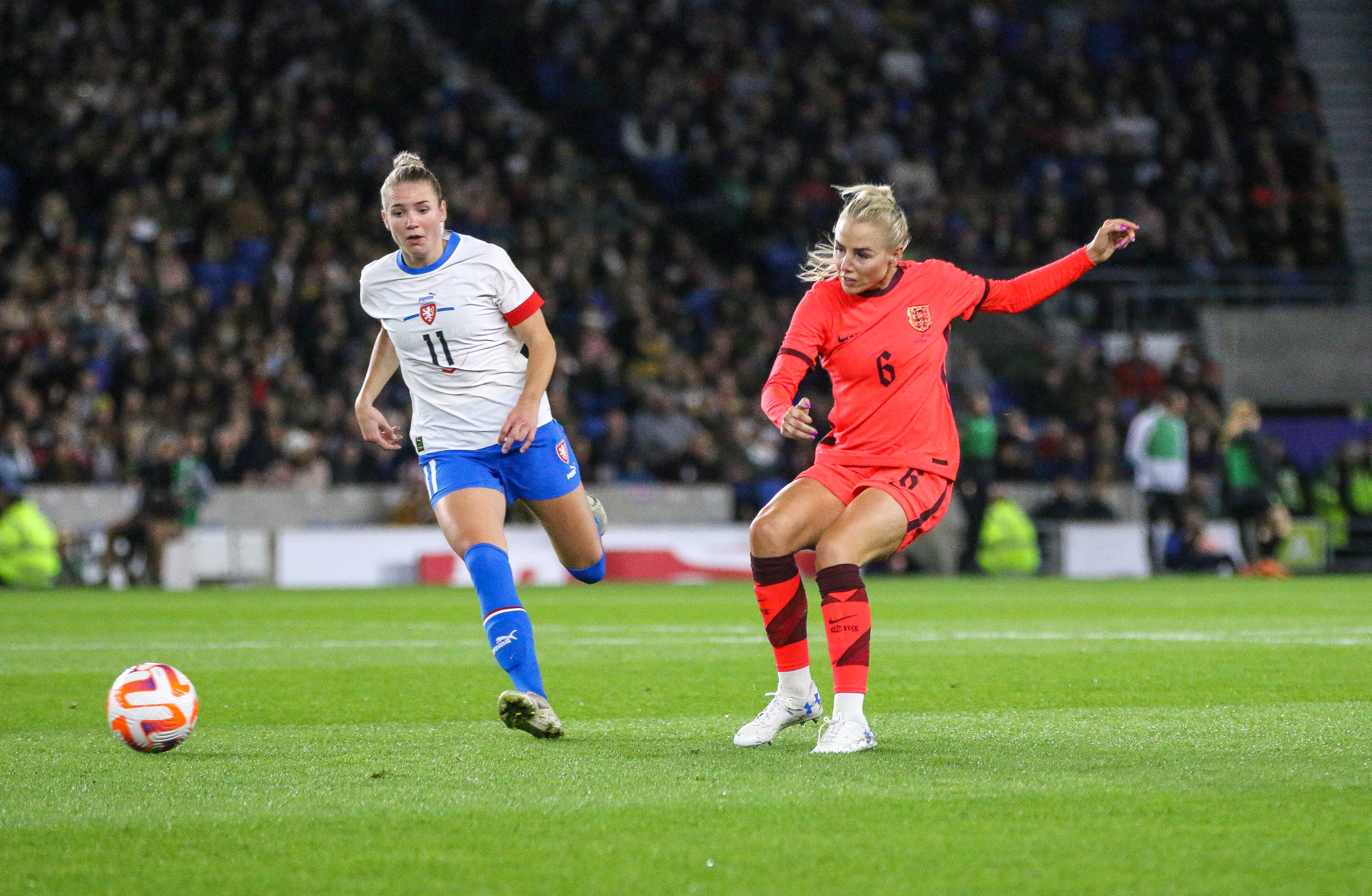
Centre-back Alex Greenwood (on the right wearing the orange shirt) passing the ball.

Centre-backs will usually go forward for set piece corners and free-kicks, where their height and jumping ability give them an aerial goal threat, while defensive duties are covered by the full-backs. Once the set piece is complete, they will retreat to their own half.

The position is sometimes referred to as "centre-half". This originates in the late part of the 19th century, when most teams employed the 2–3–5 formation, the row of three players were called half-backs. As formations evolved, the central player in this trio (the centre-half), moved into a more defensive position on the field, taking the name of the position with them.

=== Sweeper ===
The sweeper (or libero (Italian: free)) is a more versatile type of centre-back that, as the name suggests, "sweeps up" the ball if the opponent manages to breach the defensive line. Their position is rather more fluid than other defenders who mark their designated opponents. The sweeper's ability to read the game is even more vital than for a centre-back. The catenaccio system of play, used in Italian football in the 1960s, notably employed a defensive libero. With the advent of the modern offside rule came the need to hold more of a defensive line to catch opposing players offside. Use of a sweeper role became less popular as the last man can play an attacking opponent onside, which could in the case of the sweeper be behind the main defence. Nowadays, the position is commonly taught in American and Italian youth football, with most teams elsewhere never playing the position.

Former German captain Franz Beckenbauer is commonly seen as the inventor of the libero and the best player in the role. However, players such as Velibor Vasović and Armando Picchi were prominent sweepers prior to Beckenbauer. Some of the greatest sweepers were Gaetano Scirea, Bobby Moore, Franco Baresi, Daniel Passarella and Lothar Matthäus.

=== Full-back ===
The left-back and the right-back (generally referred to as the full-backs) are the defenders stationed at either side of the centre-backs to provide protection from attacking wide players. They often have to defend against the opponent's wingers, who will try to take the ball past them down the flanks in order to cross or pass into the penalty area to their attackers. Full-backs traditionally do not go up to support the attack but may move up as far as the halfway line depending on the defensive line being held. In the modern game, there has been the tendency to prefer the use of the attacking full-back (wing-back) role though they are more often than not still referred to as right- or left-backs.

Originally, a full-back was the last line of defence, but as the game developed in the early 20th century, the centre-half role was dropped backwards and came to be known as 'centre-back', and the full-backs were then pushed out wider to create the right-back and left-back positions.

=== Wing-back ===
The wing-backs (or attacking full-backs) are defenders with a more advanced emphasis on attack. The name is a portmanteau of "winger" and "full-back", indicating greater emphasis on their responsibilities in attack. They are usually employed as part of a 3–5–2 formation, and can therefore be considered part of the midfield when a team is attacking. They may also be used in a 5–3–2 formation and therefore have a more defensive role. The term "wing-back" itself is gradually falling out of use as there is less of a distinction with the full-back roles in the modern game, especially when used in a 4–3–3 or 4–2–3–1 formation.

The wing-back role is one of the most physically demanding positions in modern football. Wing-backs are often more adventurous than traditional full-backs and are expected to provide width, especially in teams without wingers. A wing-back needs to be of exceptional stamina, be able to provide crosses upfield and then defend effectively against an opponent's attack down the flanks. A defensive midfielder is usually fielded to cover the advances of an opponent's wing-back.

== Midfielder ==
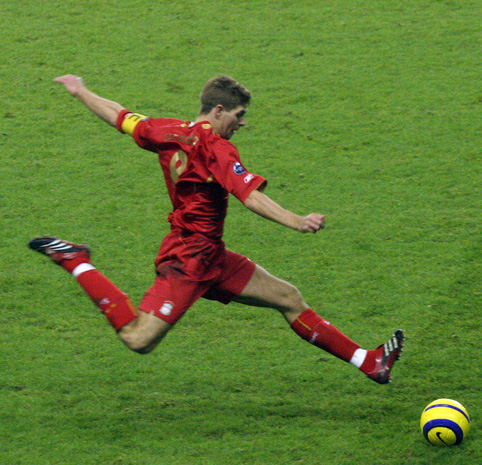
Steven Gerrard, regarded as one of the most complete midfielders of his generation.

Midfielders (originally referred to as half-backs) are players whose position of play is midway between the attacking forwards and the defenders. Their main duties are to maintain possession of the ball, receiving the ball from defenders and feeding it to the strikers, as well as dispossessing opposing players. Most managers field at least one central midfielder with a marked task of breaking up opposition's attacks while the rest are more adept to creating goals or have equal responsibilities between attack and defence. Midfielders can be expected to cover many areas of a pitch, as at times they can be called back into defence or required to attack with the strikers. They are more often the players that initiate attacking play for a team.

=== Central midfielder ===
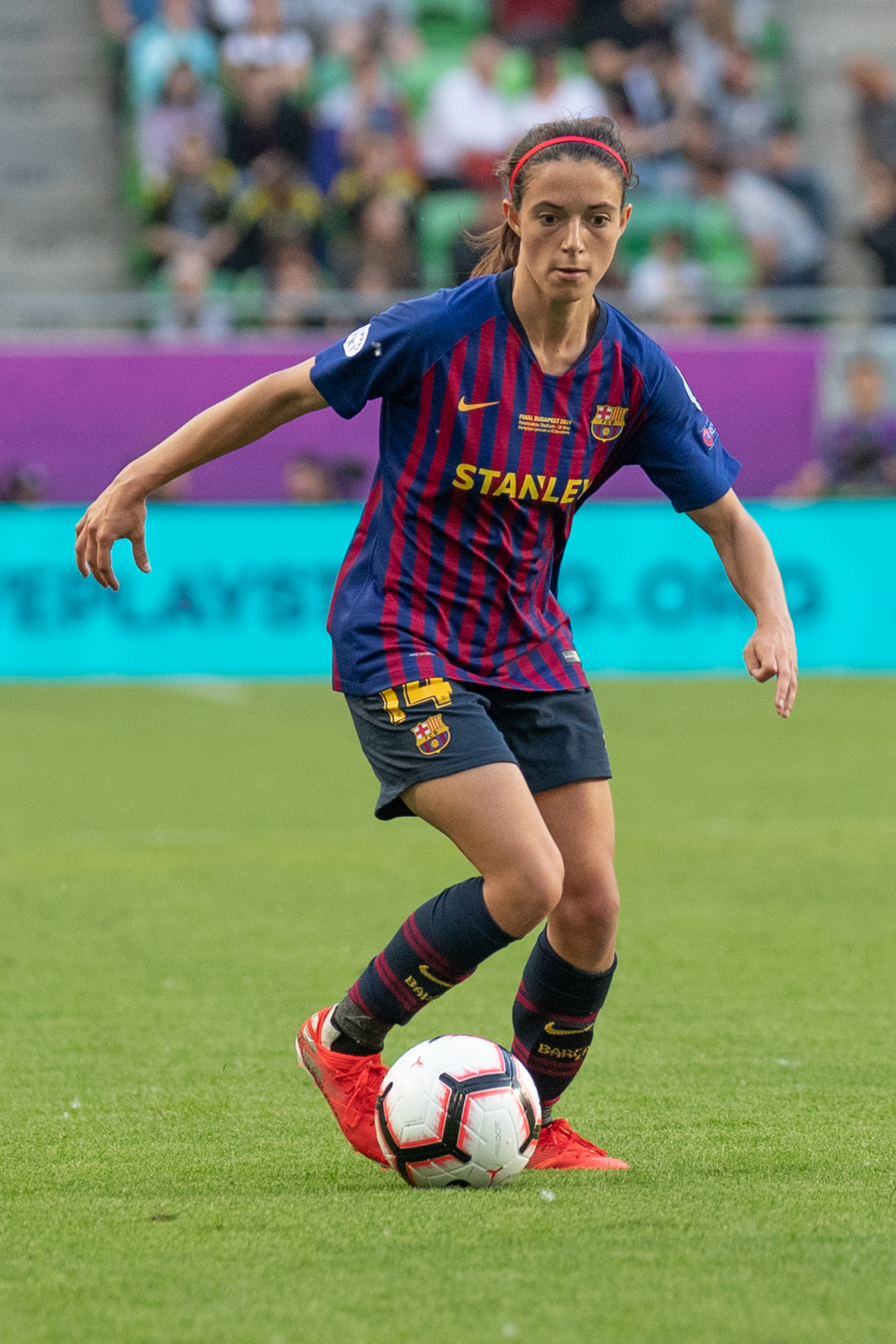
Central midfielder Aitana Bonmatí is considered one of the best players in the world.

The central midfielder provides a link between defence and attack, fulfilling a number of duties and operating primarily in the middle third of the pitch. They will support their team's attacking play and endeavour to win the ball back on defense. A central midfielder is often an important initiator of attacks and can be sometimes described as a "playmaker." They will also offer an additional line of defence when the team is under sustained attack and when defending set pieces. Central midfielders are always busy in a game and are therefore sometimes described as the engine room of the team.

Their central position enables them to have an all-round view of the match. Since most of the action takes place in and around their area of the pitch, midfielders often exert the greatest degree of control over how a match is played. It is often said that a match is won or lost in midfield, meaning that whichever team dominates the middle area of the pitch is able to dictate the game. A central midfielder is expected to have good vision, be adept at long and short passing and have great stamina because of the ground they cover in a game. They also need to be good at tackling to win the ball back.

Over time two additional central midfield roles have developed from the standard role, though their duties have a degree of overlap. These are the attacking midfield and defensive midfield roles and are explained in the sections below. Depending on the team's tactics a combination of all three roles may be deployed in midfield. Sometimes a central midfielder will be used in a wide midfield role to provide width or as cover.

=== Defensive midfielder ===
A defensive midfielder (holding midfielder or midfield anchor) is a central midfielder who is stationed in front of the defenders to provide more defensive protection, thus "holding back" when the rest of the midfield supports the attack. The defensive midfielder screens the defence by harrying and tackling the opposition teams' attackers and defenders. They also help tactically, for instance, by directing opposing attacking players out to the wing where they have more limited influence, and by covering the positions of full-backs, other midfielders and even the centre-backs if they charge up to support the attack. For this reason, they are considered to be part of defensive line.

Although the duties of defensive midfielders are primarily defensive, some midfielders are deployed as deep-lying playmakers, due to their ability to dictate tempo from a deep position with their passing. Sometimes a defensive midfielder will be paired with a central midfielder who will act as the deep-lying playmaker. Whenever the central midfielder ventures forward the defensive midfielder will hold back.

Defensive midfielders require good positional sense, work rate, tackling ability, and anticipation (of player and ball movement) to excel. They also need to possess good passing skills and close control to hold the ball in midfield under sustained pressure. Most importantly, defensive midfielders require great stamina as they are the outfield players who cover the greatest distance during a professional match. In top football clubs, a midfielder may cover up to 12 kilometres for a full 90-minute game. Deep-lying playmakers typically require a good first touch under opposition pressure and the ability to play long crossfield passes to attacking players further upfield.

=== Attacking midfielder ===
An attacking midfielder is a midfield player who is positioned in an advanced midfield position, usually between central midfield and the team's forwards, and who has a primarily offensive role.

According to positioning along the field, attacking midfield may be divided into left, right and central attacking midfield roles. A central attacking midfielder may be referred to as a playmaker, or number ten (due to the association of the number 10 shirt with this position).

These players typically serve as the offensive pivot of the team, and are sometimes said to be "playing in the hole", although this term can also be used to describe the positioning of a deep-lying forward. Their main role is to create goal-scoring opportunities using superior vision, control, and technical skill. The attacking midfielder is an important position that requires the player to possess superior technical abilities in terms of passing and, perhaps more importantly, the ability to read the opposing defence in order to deliver defence-splitting passes to the strikers; in addition to their technical and creative ability, they are also usually quick, agile, and mobile players, which aids them in beating opponents during dribbling runs.

Some attacking midfielders are called trequartistas or fantasisti (Italian: three-quarter specialist, i.e. a playmaker between the forwards and the midfield), known for their deft touch, vision, ability to shoot from range, and passing prowess. However, not all attacking midfielders are trequartistas – some attacking midfielders are very vertical and are essentially auxiliary attackers, i.e. secondary striker. In Brazil, the offensive playmaker is known as the "meia atacante", whereas in Argentina, it is known as the "enganche".

=== Wide midfielder ===
A wide midfielder (left midfield and right midfield, or generally side midfielder) (historically called left-half and right-half, or wing-half) is a midfielder who is stationed to the left or right of central midfield. Though they are often referred to as wingers, not all players in these positions are stereotypical speedy, touchline hugging players. With the advent of the modern game the traditional outside forwards known as "wingers" were pushed back to wide midfield, though still commonly referred to as wingers. As the game has developed further, some tactical formations (for example, 4–3–3) have used central midfielders deployed in a wider position to provide width, more defensive protection along the flanks and to help compress play in the opponent's half. They will still support attacking play and sometimes be expected to act as a semi-winger.

== Forward ==
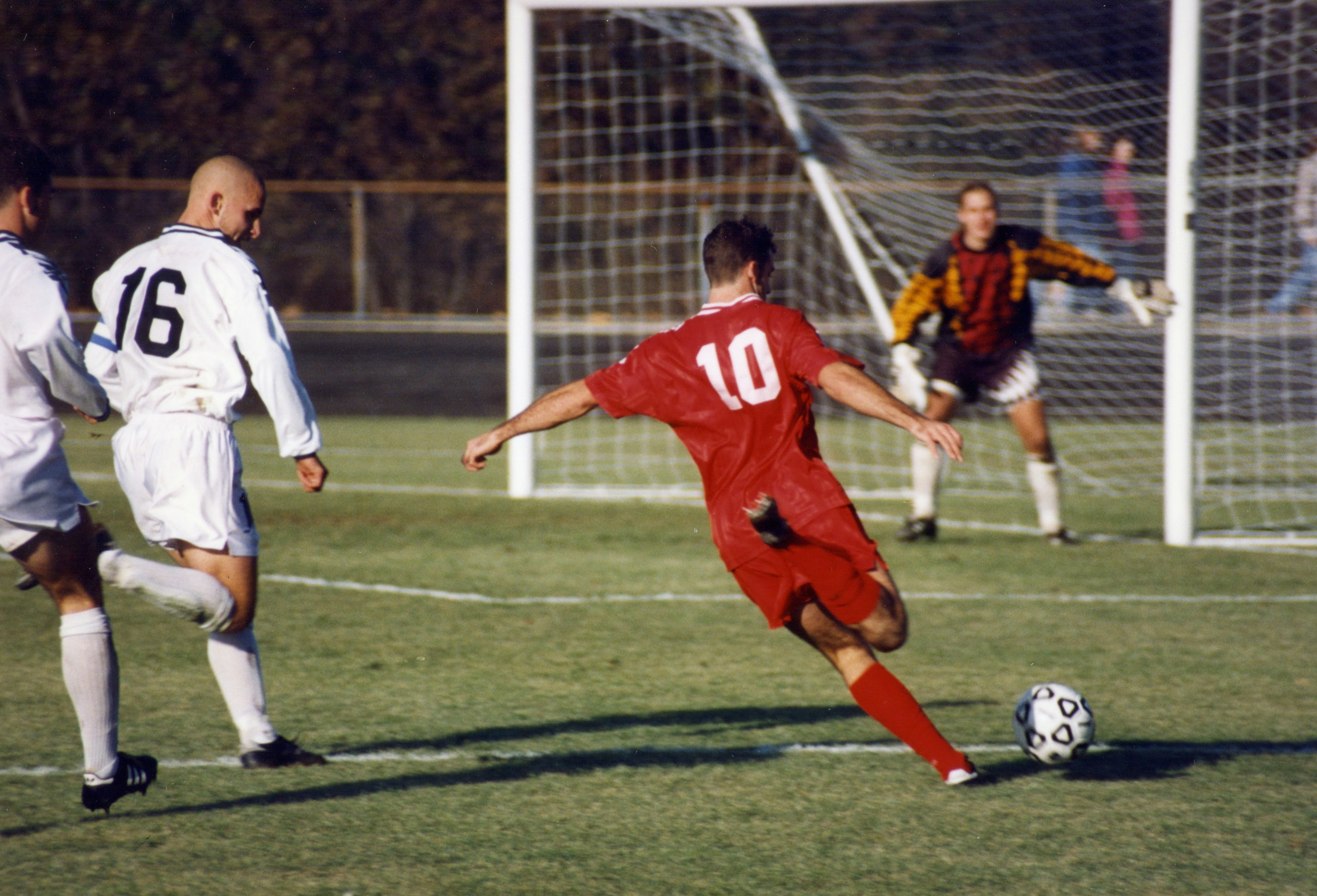
The striker (wearing the red shirt) is past the defence (in the white shirts) and is about to take a shot at the goal.

Forwards are players who are positioned nearest to the opposing team's goal. The primary responsibility of forwards is to score goals and to create scoring chances for other players. Forwards may also contribute defensively by harrying opposition defenders and goalkeepers whilst not in possession. The most common modern formations include between one and three forwards; for example, a lone striker in a 4–2–3–1, paired strikers in a 4–4–2 or a striker and two wingers in a 4–3–3.

Coaches will often field one striker who plays on the shoulder of the last opposing defender and another attacking forward who plays somewhat deeper and assists in creating goals as well as scoring. The former is sometimes a large striker, typically known as a "target man", who is used either to distract opposing defenders to help teammates score, or to score themselves; the latter is usually of quicker pace, and is required to have some abilities like finding holes in the opposing defence and, sometimes, dribbling. In other cases, strikers will operate on the wings of the field and work their way goalwards. Yet another variation is the replacement of the target man with a striker who can thread through-balls.

Players who specialise in playing as a target are usually of above-average height with good heading ability and an accurate shot. They tend to be the "outlet" player for both midfielders and defenders, able to "hold the ball up" (retain possession of the ball in an advanced position while teammates run forward to join the attack). They tend to score goals from crosses, often with the head, and can use their body strength to shield the ball while turning to score.

Other forwards may rely on their pace to run onto long balls passed over or through the opposition defence, rather than collecting the ball with their back to goal like a target man. Some forwards can play both of these roles equally well.

=== Centre forward ===
A centre forward (or striker) has the key task of scoring goals and for this reason acts as the focal point of the majority of attacking play by a team. As such, how well a striker is performing tends to be measured purely on goals scored despite the fact that they may be contributing in other ways to a team's success. A traditional centre forward was required to be tall in height and strong physically in order to be able to win the ball in the area from crosses and attempt to score with either their feet or head, or to knock the ball down for a teammate to score. Whilst these assets are still an advantage, in the modern game speed and movement are also required as there is more interplay when attacking. In a 4–4–2 or 4–4–1–1 formation the centre forward is often paired with a second striker who may play around them or in a slightly withdrawn role respectively, though it is not unknown to play two recognised centre forwards.

Sometimes a team may opt on a more defensive formation such as 4–5–1 in which the centre forward is required to play a "lone role" up front. In these cases a team may look for opportunities to counter-attack on the break and the centre forward may find themselves attacking the goal on their own with just a defender to beat or alternatively they may hold the ball up in the opponent's half to allow other players to join in the attack. Modern footballing tactics have made more use of 4–3–3 and 4–2–3–1 formations. Here the centre forward may be involved more with the attacking build up play, supported by wingers (who often come infield) and attacking midfielders. The play uses more shorter, quick passes with movement off the ball, looking to create an opening on goal.

Centre forwards are often referred to as a number nine (due to the association of the number 9 shirt with this position), and may also operate as a false nine who, unlike conventional centre forwards, drop into deeper areas of the pitch with the purpose of drawing defenders away from their defensive line and linking up with teammates making forward runs towards goal.

=== Second striker ===
A second striker (or support striker) (historically called inside-left and inside-right, or inside forward) has a long history in the game, but the terminology to describe them has varied over the years. Originally such players were termed inside forwards, while more recent terms also include shadow striker, deep-lying forward, and are often referred to as playing "in the hole" (i.e. the space between the midfield and the defence of the opposing team).

The position was initially developed by the famous Hungary national team of the late 1940s and mid-1950s led by Ferenc Puskás. Later, it was popularised in Italian football as the trequartista ("three-quarters") or fantasista, the advanced playmaker who plays neither in midfield nor as a forward, but effectively pulls the strings for their team's attack, and serves as an assist provider. Many players in this position can play in a free role, as an attacking midfielder or sometimes on the wing.

Whatever the terminology, the position itself is a loosely defined one, a player who lies somewhere between the out-and-out striker and the midfield, who can perform this role effectively due to their vision, technical skills, creativity, and passing ability. Such a player is either a skillful, attack-minded midfielder or a creative striker who can both score and create opportunities for centre forwards, although a second striker will often not be involved in build-up plays as much as an attacking midfielder. As the supporting forward role was popularised in Italy due to free-role attacking midfielders adapting to a more advanced position in the tactically rigorous 4–4–2 formations of the 1990s, their defensive contribution is also usually higher than that of a pure number ten playmaker. In Italy, this role is also known as a "rifinitore" or "seconda punta", whereas in Brazil, it is known as a "segundo atacante".

=== Winger ===
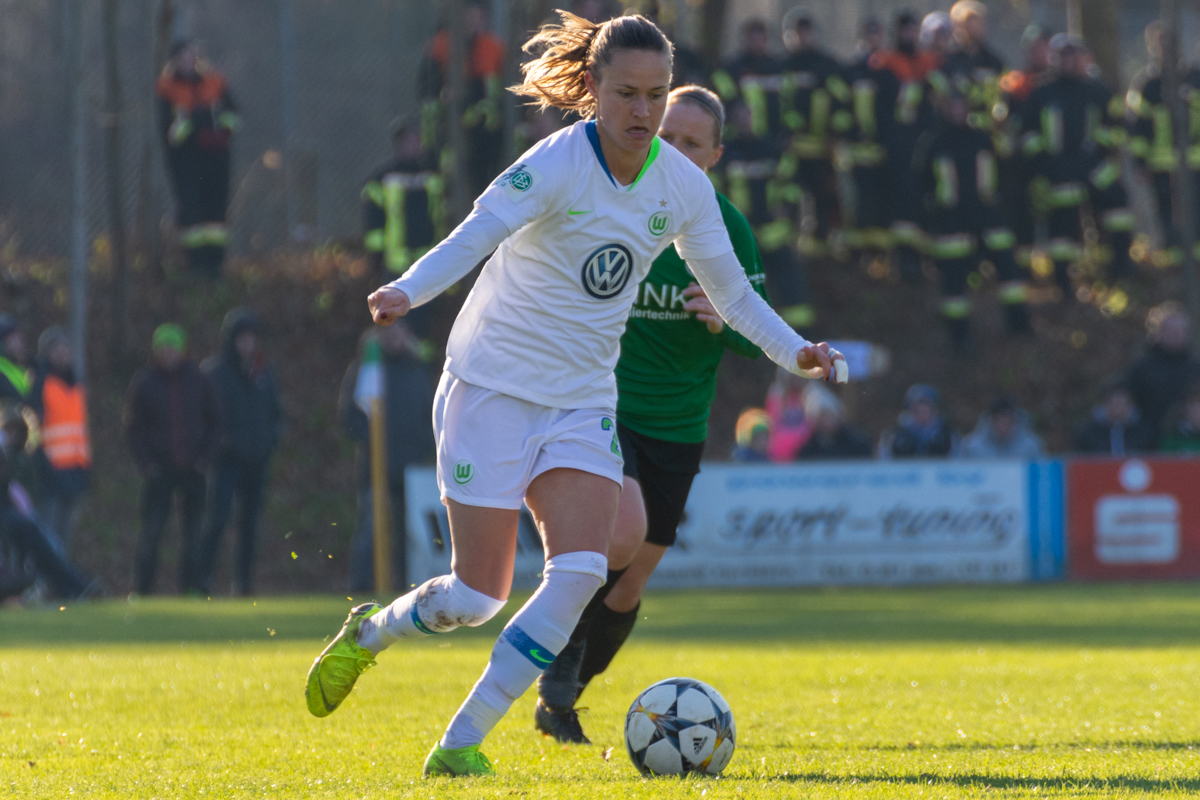
Winger Caroline Graham Hansen is known for her dribbling ability, an important quality in wingers.

A winger (left winger and right winger) (historically called outside-left and outside-right, or outside forward) is an attacking player who is stationed in a wide position near the touchlines. They can be classified as forwards, considering their origin as the old outside forward who played out on the "wing" (i.e. side of the pitch). They continue to be termed as such in many parts of the world, especially in Latin and Dutch footballing cultures. However, in the English-speaking world, they are usually counted as part of the midfield having been pushed back there with the advent of the 4–4–2 formation which gradually rose to prominence in the 1960s, given the role's additional defensive duties. A winger's main attribute is usually speed which is used to attack and dribble past opponent's full-backs in order to get behind the defence and to then deliver crosses and passes into the centre for their attackers. Occasionally left and right footed wingers may swap sides of the field as a tactical move to enable the winger to cut inside against the opposing full-back's weaker foot, looking for a shooting opportunity or just as a means of opening up the defence. Clubs such as Barcelona and Real Madrid often choose to play their wingers on the 'wrong' flank for this reason.

Although wingers are a familiar part of football, the use of wingers is by no means universal, and many successful teams have operated without wingers. At the 1966 World Cup, England manager Alf Ramsey led a team without natural wingers to the title; this was unusual enough at the time for the team to be nicknamed "The Wingless Wonders". A more recent example is that of Italian club Milan, who have typically played in a narrow midfield diamond formation or in a "Christmas tree" formation (4–3–2–1), relying on attacking full-backs to provide the necessary width down the wings.

== See also ==
- Formation (association football)
- Association football tactics and skills
- Bandy, a hockey sport in which much the same positions are used as in association football
