= Croatia national football team records and statistics =

This article lists various football records and statistics in relation to the Croatia national football team. The national team represents Croatia in international football. It is fielded by the Croatian Football Federation (HNS) and competes as a member of FIFA and UEFA.

== Individual records ==
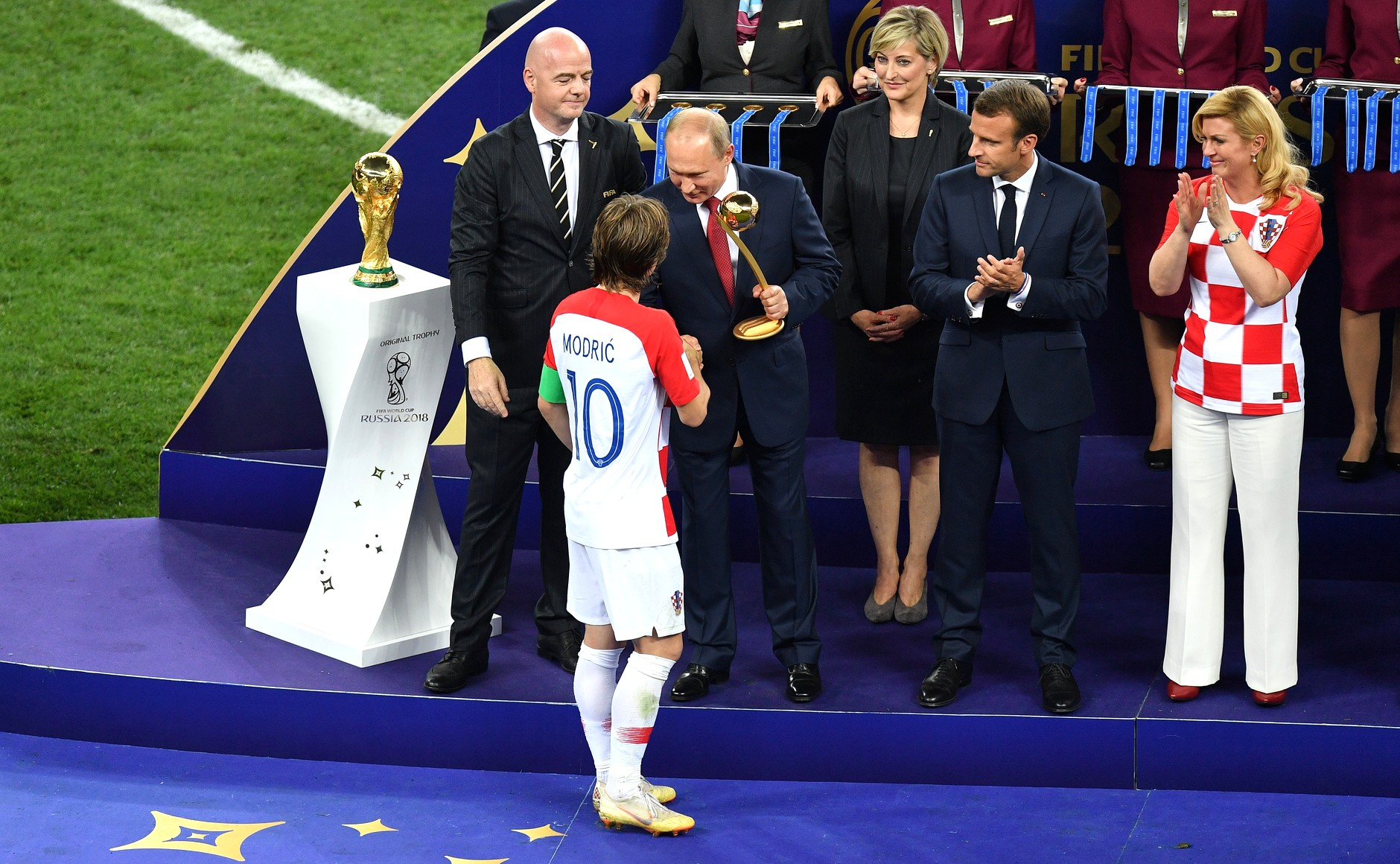
Midfielder Luka Modrić maintains a variety of national records for Croatia accumulated over a 20-year career.

=== Player records ===
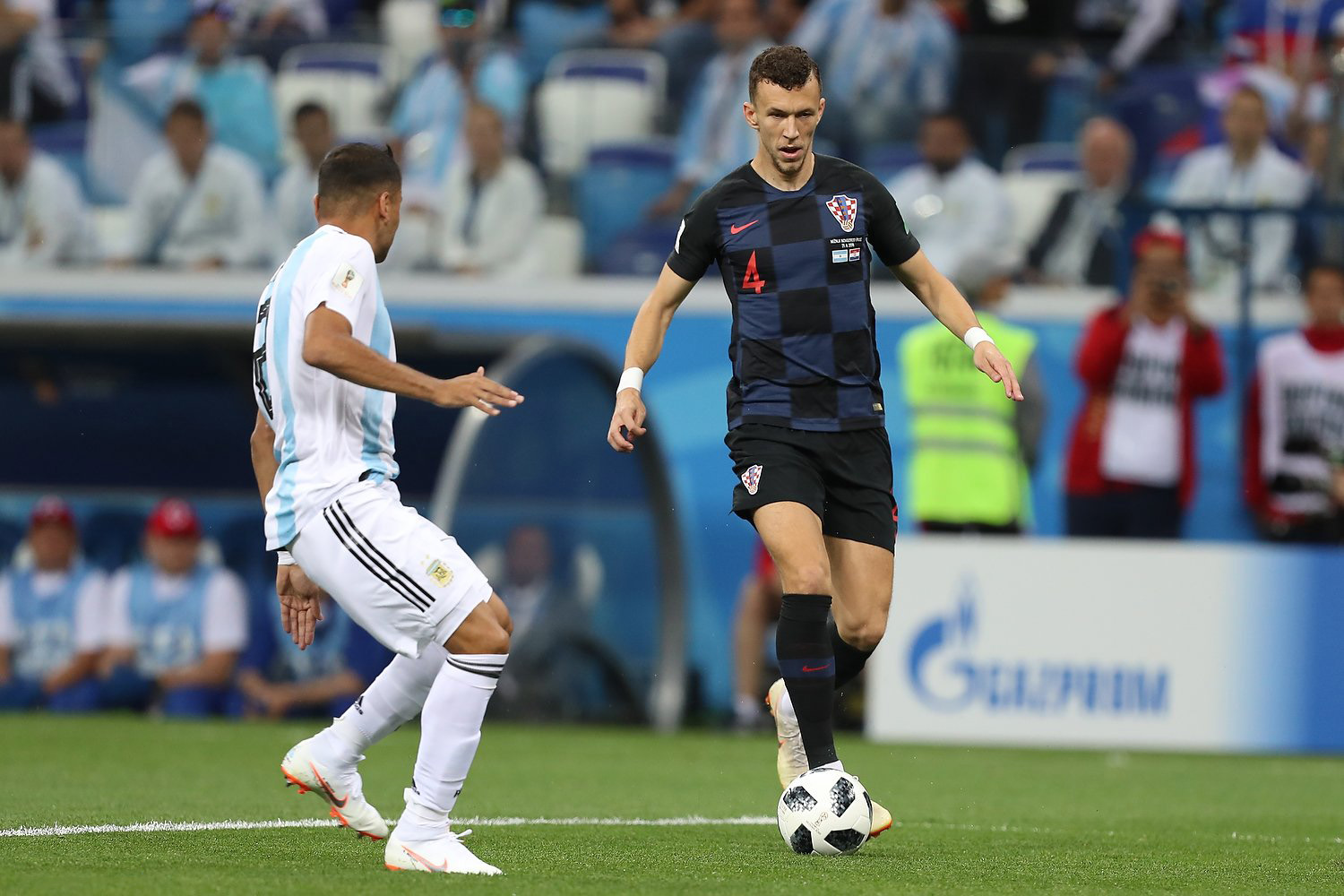
Ivan Perišić (right, blue) holds the record for most assists and goals scored by a Croatian in a World Cup.

- First player to reach 100 appearances: Dario Šimić (20 August 2008)
- Fastest player to reach 100 appearances: Ivan Perišić (10 years 2 months 6 days)
- Most appearances as captain: Luka Modrić (97)
- Longest international career: Luka Modrić, 1 March 2006–present
- Shortest international career: Mario Bazina (1 cap), 60 seconds, 12 February 2002
- Oldest player in a match: Luka Modrić (40 years and 296 days)
- Youngest player in match: Alen Halilović (16 years, 11 months and 23 days)
- Youngest player at major tournament: Joško Gvardiol (19 years and 4 months)
- Youngest goal-scorer: Luka Ivanušec (18 years, 1 month and 19 days)
- Most hat-tricks: Davor Šuker (2) and Mario Mandžukić (2)
- First hat-trick: Davor Šuker (1995)
- Most goals scored in a match: Mladen Petrić (4)
- Best goal-to-game ratio: Davor Šuker (45 goals in 68 caps, 0.66 ratio)

FIFA World Cup

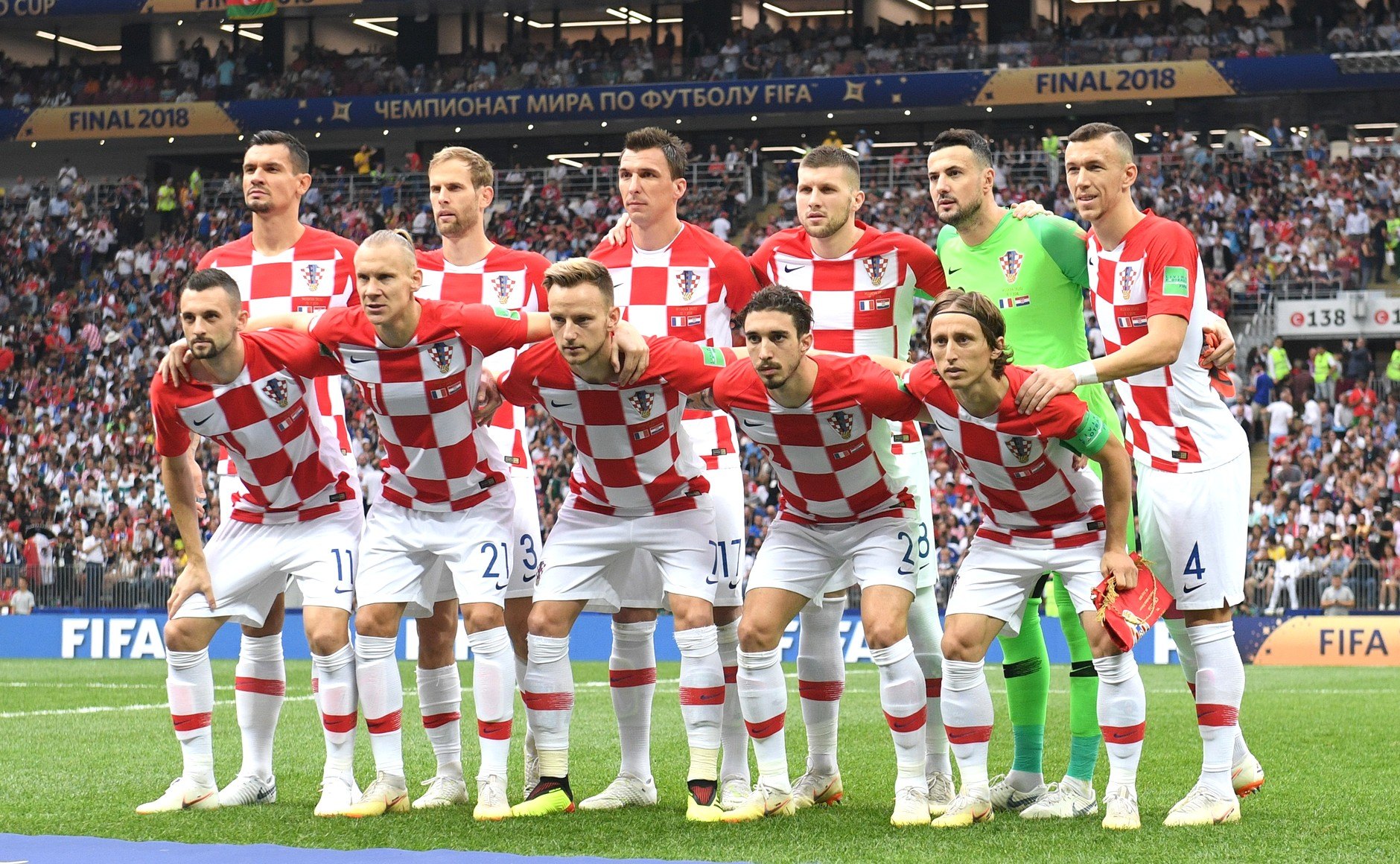
The national squad, lining up for the 2018 FIFA World Cup final against France.

- Most World Cup appearances: Luka Modrić (5 tournaments)
- Most World Cup goals: Ivan Perišić (7)
- Most World Cup assists: Ivan Perišić (6)
- Most World Cup penalties: Luka Modrić (4)
- Oldest World Cup goal-scorer: Ivan Perišić (37 years and 150 days)
- Youngest World Cup goal-scorer: Joško Gvardiol (20 years and 328 days)
- First World Cup goal: Mario Stanić (14 June 1998)

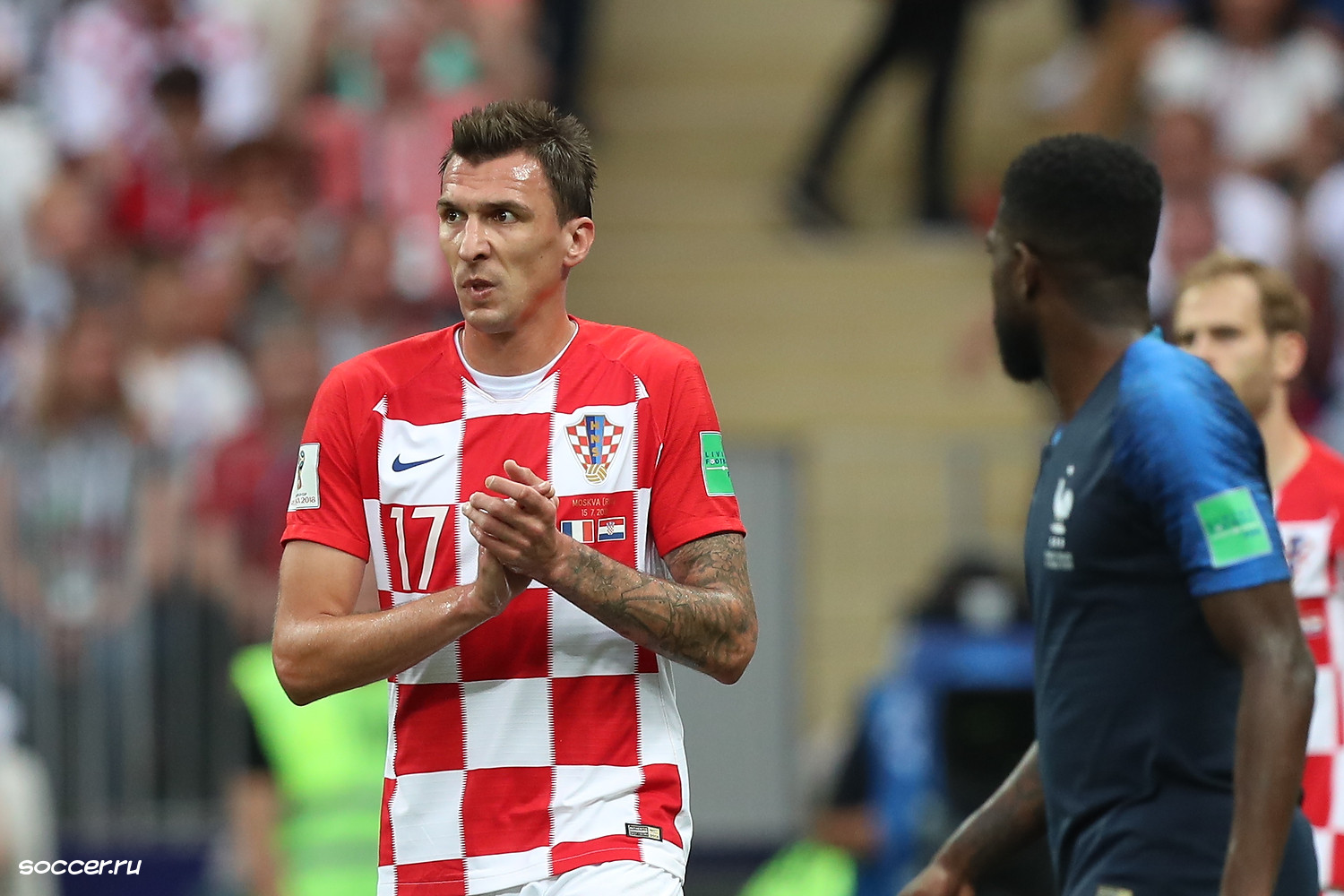
Striker Mario Mandžukić holds select records for both goal-scoring speed and count.

UEFA European Championship

- Most Euros appearances: Luka Modrić (5 tournaments)
- Most Euros goals: Ivan Perišić (4) and Luka Modrić (4)
- Most Euros assists: Danijel Pranjić (2), Darijo Srna (2), and Ivan Perišić (2)
- Most Euros penalties: Luka Modrić (2)
- Oldest Euros player: Luka Modrić (38 years and 289 days)
- Oldest Euros goal-scorer: Luka Modrić (38 years and 289 days)
- Youngest Euros player: Joško Gvardiol (19 years and 141 days)
- Youngest Euros goal-scorer: Luka Modrić (22 years and 273 days)
- Fastest Euros goal-scorer: Mario Mandžukić (3 mins, UEFA Euro 2012)
- Most goal-scoring in Euros tournaments: Luka Modrić (4 tournaments)

UEFA Nations League

- Most Nations League appearances: Luka Modrić (4 tournaments)
- Most Nations League goals: Andrej Kramarić (6)
- Youngest Nations League player: Dion Drena Beljo (21)
- Oldest Nations League player: Luka Modrić (39 years 195 days)

==== Most capped players ====
Rank	Player	First appearance	Last appearance	Caps
1	Luka Modrić	1 March 2006	26 September 2026	203
2	Ivan Perišić	26 March 2011	26 September 2026	159
3	Darijo Srna	20 November 2002	25 June 2016	134
4	Andrej Kramarić	4 September 2014	2 July 2026	119
5	Mateo Kovačić	22 March 2013	26 September 2026	118
6	Stipe Pletikosa	10 February 1999	23 June 2014	114
7	Ivan Rakitić	8 September 2007	13 October 2019	106
8	Domagoj Vida	23 May 2010	3 June 2024	105
8	Josip Šimunić	10 November 2001	19 November 2013	105
10	Ivica Olić	13 February 2002	13 October 2015	104
11	Vedran Ćorluka	16 August 2006	11 July 2018	103
12	Dario Šimić	13 March 1996	20 August 2008	100
13	Marcelo Brozović	7 June 2014	24 June 2024	99
14	Mario Pašalić	4 September 2014	26 September 2026	90
15	Mario Mandžukić	17 November 2007	15 July 2018	89
16	Robert Kovač	28 April 1999	14 October 2009	84
17	Niko Kovač	11 December 1996	11 October 2008	83
18	Niko Kranjčar	18 August 2004	15 October 2013	81
18	Robert Jarni	22 December 1990	13 June 2002	81
20	Dominik Livaković	11 January 2017	27 September 2026	80
21	Dejan Lovren	8 October 2009	13 December 2022	78
22	Davor Šuker	22 December 1990	3 June 2002	69
23	Nikola Vlašić	27 May 2017	26 September 2026	67
24	Eduardo da Silva	16 November 2004	18 June 2014	64
25	Aljoša Asanović	17 October 1990	28 May 2000	62
26	Zvonimir Soldo	20 April 1994	8 June 2002	61
27	Dražen Ladić	17 October 1990	28 May 2000	59
27	Jerko Leko	8 May 2002	8 October 2009	59
29	Danijel Pranjić	16 November 2004	3 September 2015	58
30	Igor Tudor	15 November 1997	2 June 2006	55
30	Ognjen Vukojević	16 October 2007	31 May 2014	55
30	Milan Badelj	2 September 2011	1 June 2021	55
33	Igor Štimac	22 December 1990	13 February 2002	53
33	Joško Gvardiol	6 June 2021	26 September 2026	53
34	Goran Vlaović	5 July 1992	21 August 2002	52
34	Šime Vrsaljko	9 February 2011	10 June 2022	52
Updated on 27 September 2026, after match against Czech Republic.

==== Top goalscorers ====
Rank	Player	Croatia career	Goals	Caps
1	Davor Šuker	1990–2002	45	68
2	Ivan Perišić	2011–	39	159
3	Andrej Kramarić	2014–	36	119
4	Mario Mandžukić	2007–2018	33	89
5	Luka Modrić	2006–	30	203
6	Eduardo da Silva	2004–2014	29	64
7	Darijo Srna	2002–2016	22	134
8	Ivica Olić	2002–2015	20	104
9	Niko Kranjčar	2004–2013	16	81
10	Nikola Kalinić	2008–2018	15	42
10	Goran Vlaović	1992–2002	15	52
10	Ivan Rakitić	2007–2019	15	106
Updated on 27 September 2026, after match against Czech Republic.

==== Top assisters ====
This dynamic list may require expansion to include the top ten assisters, with references to reliable sources.

Rank	Player	Croatia career	Assists	Caps
1	Luka Modrić	2006–	32	203
2	Ivan Perišić	2011–	21	159
3	Ivan Rakitić	2007–2019	17	106
4	Darijo Srna	2002–2016	15	134
5	Andrej Kramarić	2014–	14	119
Updated on 27 September July 2026, after match against Czech Republic.

==== Technical records ====
Record	Player	Record set
Distance traveled in match (17.94 km (11.14 mi))	Petar Sučić	23 March 2025
Highest speed in match (36.8 km/h (22 mph))	Petar Sučić	31 March 2026
Updated on 31 March 2026, after match against Brazil.

=== Manager records ===
- Most international matches won as manager: 62 by Zlatko Dalić
- Most international matches lost as manager: 29 by Zlatko Dalić
- Highest winning ratio: Slaven Bilić (64.61%)
- Longest-serving manager: Zlatko Dalić (2017–2026)
- Shortest-serving manager: Stanko Poklepović (1992)

==== Manager results ====
The following table provides a summary of the complete record of each Croatia manager, including their results regarding World Cups and European Championships.

Manager	Period	Pld	W	D	L	Win %	Major competitions
(Banovina of Croatia) Jozo Jakopić	1939–1941	4	2	1	1	50.00	—
(Independent State of Croatia) Rudolf Hitrec	1941	1	0	0	1	0.00	—
(Independent State of Croatia) Bogdan Cuvaj	1941–1943	13	6	3	4	46.15	—
(Independent State of Croatia) Bernard Hügl	1943–1945	1	1	0	0	100.00	—
(Socialist Republic of Croatia) Bruno Knežević, Leo Lemešić, Franjo Wölfl	1956	1	1	0	0	100.00	—
(Croatia) Dražan Jerković	1990–1991	3	3	0	0	100.00	—
(Croatia) Stanko Poklepović	1992	4	1	1	2	25.00	—
(Croatia) Vlatko Marković	1993–1994	1	1	0	0	100.00	—
(Croatia) Miroslav Blažević	1994–2000	72	33	24	15	45.83	1996 European Championship – Quarter-final; 1998 World Cup – Third place 2000 European Championship – Failed to qualify
(Croatia) Tomislav Ivić (c) (Note: In September 1994, national team manager Miroslav Blažević, who was also coaching Croatia Zagreb at the time, was dismissed in a 1994–95 UEFA Cup Winners' Cup match against Auxerre. Blažević was suspended by UEFA for one game and Ivić was appointed as his replacement for the UEFA Euro 1996 qualifying match against Italy in November 1994.)	1994	1	1	0	0	100.00	—
(Croatia) Mirko Jozić	2000–2002	18	9	6	3	50.00	2002 World Cup – Group stage
(Croatia) Otto Barić	2002–2004	24	11	8	5	45.83	2004 European Championship – Group stage
(Croatia) Zlatko Kranjčar	2004–2006	25	11	8	6	44.00	2006 World Cup – Group stage
(Croatia) Slaven Bilić	2006–2012	65	42	15	8	64.62	2008 European Championship – Quarter-final; 2010 World Cup – Failed to qualify 2012 European Championship – Group stage
(Croatia) Igor Štimac	2012–2013	15	8	2	5	53.33	—
(Croatia) Niko Kovač	2013–2015	19	10	5	4	52.63	2014 World Cup – Group stage
(Croatia) Ante Čačić	2015–2017	25	15	6	4	60.00	2016 European Championship – Round of 16
(Croatia) Zlatko Dalić	2017–2026	111	57	26	28	51.35	2018 World Cup – Runners-up; 2020 European Championship – Round of 16; 2022 World Cup – Third place 2022–23 UEFA Nations League – Runners-up; 2024 European Championship – Group stage 2024–25 UEFA Nations League – Quarter-finals; 2026 World Cup – Round of 32
Totals		403	212	105	86	52.61%	WC & EC: 14 out of 16

Last updated: Portugal v Croatia, 2 July 2026.

Source: Croatian Football Federation

== Team records ==
=== Home matches ===
Key: Pld–games played, W–games won, D–games drawn; L–games lost, %–win percentage

Stadium	City / town	Pld	W	D	L	Win %	Last match hosted
Stadion Maksimir	Zagreb	68	47	15	6	69.1	2022
Stadion Poljud	Split	18	4	9	5	22.2	2023
Stadion Gradski vrt	Osijek	14	10	3	1	71.4	2022
Opus Arena	Osijek	3	2	0	1	66.7	2025
Stadion Kantrida	Rijeka	11	10	1	0	90.9	2011
Stadion Varteks	Varaždin	8	5	2	1	62.5	2019
Stadion Rujevica	Rijeka	7	5	2	0	71.4	2021
Stadion A. Drosina	Pula	5	4	0	1	80.0	2019
Stadion Cibalia	Vinkovci	1	1	0	0	100.0	2009
Stadion Koprivnica	Koprivnica	1	1	0	0	100.0	2016
Stadion Kranjčevićeva	Zagreb	1	1	0	0	100.0	1996
Stadion Šubićevac	Šibenik	1	0	1	0	0.0	2003
Stadion Radnik	Velika Gorica	1	0	1	0	0.0	2021
Totals		136	88	34	14	64.7%	2023

Last updated: Croatia vs. Wales, 25 March 2023. Statistics include official FIFA-recognised matches only.

== Competition records ==
=== FIFA World Cup ===
*Draws include knockout matches decided via penalty shoot-out; correct as of 2 July 2026 after the match against Portugal.

FIFA World Cup record										Qualification record						
Year	Result	Position	Pld	W	D	L	GF	GA	Squad	Pos	Pld	W	D	L	GF	GA
1930 to 1990	Part of Yugoslavia									—N/a						
(United States) 1994	Did not enter									—N/a						
(France) 1998	Third place	3rd	7	5	0	2	11	5	Squad	2nd	10	5	4	1	20	13
(South Korea) (Japan) 2002	Group stage	23rd	3	1	0	2	2	3	Squad	1st	8	5	3	0	15	2
(Germany) 2006	Group stage	22nd	3	0	2	1	2	3	Squad	1st	10	7	3	0	21	5
(South Africa) 2010	Did not qualify									3rd	10	6	2	2	19	13
(Brazil) 2014	Group stage	19th	3	1	0	2	6	6	Squad	2nd	12	6	3	3	14	9
(Russia) 2018	Runners-up	2nd	7	4	2	1	14	9	Squad	2nd	12	7	3	2	19	5
(Qatar) 2022	Third place	3rd	7	2	4	1	8	7	Squad	1st	10	7	2	1	21	4
(Canada) (Mexico) (United States) 2026	Round of 32	20th	4	2	0	2	6	7	Squad	1st	8	7	1	0	26	4
Total	Runners-up	7/8	34	15	8	11	49	40	–	–	80	50	21	9	155	55

Croatia's World Cup record
First match	Croatia 3–1 Jamaica (14 June 1998; Lens, France)
Biggest Win	Croatia 4–0 Cameroon (18 June 2014; Manaus, Brazil)
Biggest Defeat	Argentina 3–0 Croatia (13 December 2022; Lusail, Qatar)
Best Result	Runners-up in 2018
Worst Result	Group stage in 2002, 2006 and 2014

=== UEFA European Championship ===
*Draws include knockout matches decided via penalty shoot-out; correct as of 24 June 2024 after the match against Italy.

UEFA European Championship record										Qualification record						
Year	Round	Position	Pld	W	D	L	GF	GA	Squad	Pos	Pld	W	D	L	GF	GA
1960 to 1992	Part of Yugoslavia									—N/a						
(England) 1996	Quarter-finals	7th	4	2	0	2	5	5	Squad	1st	10	7	2	1	22	5
(Belgium) (Netherlands) 2000	Did not qualify									3rd	8	4	3	1	13	9
(Portugal) 2004	Group stage	13th	3	0	2	1	4	6	Squad	2nd	10	6	2	2	14	5
(Austria) (Switzerland) 2008	Quarter-finals	5th	4	3	1	0	5	2	Squad	1st	12	9	2	1	28	8
(Poland) (Ukraine) 2012	Group stage	10th	3	1	1	1	4	3	Squad	2nd	12	8	2	2	21	7
(France) 2016	Round of 16	9th	4	2	1	1	5	4	Squad	2nd	10	6	3	1	20	5
(Europe) 2020	Round of 16	14th	4	1	1	2	7	8	Squad	1st	8	5	2	1	17	7
(Germany) 2024	Group stage	20th	3	0	2	1	3	6	Squad	2nd	8	5	1	2	13	4
Total	Quarter-finals	7/8	25	9	8	8	33	34	–	–	78	50	17	11	148	50

Croatia's European Championship record
First match	Croatia 1–0 Turkey (11 June 1996; Nottingham, England)
Biggest Win	Croatia 3–0 Denmark (16 June 1996; Sheffield, England)
Biggest Defeat	Portugal 3–0 Croatia (19 June 1996; Nottingham, England) Spain 3–0 Croatia (24 June 2024; Berlin, Germany)
Best Result	Quarter-finals in 1996 and 2008
Worst Result	Group stage in 2004, 2012 and 2024

=== UEFA Nations League ===
*Draws include knockout matches decided via penalty shoot-out; correct as of 23 March 2025, after the match against France.

UEFA Nations League record
Season	Division	Group	Pld	W	D	L	GF	GA	P/R	Rank
(Portugal) 2018–19	A	4	4	1	1	2	4	10	Same position	9th
(Italy) 2020–21	A	3	6	1	0	5	9	16	Same position	12th
(Netherlands) 2022–23	A	1	8	5	2	1	12	8	Same position	Runners-up
(Germany) 2024–25	A	1	8	3	2	3	10	10	Same position	8th
Total			26	10	5	11	35	44	Runners-up	

Croatia's Nations League record
First match	Spain 6–0 Croatia (Elche, Spain; 11 September 2018)
Biggest Win	Austria 1–3 Croatia (Vienna, Austria; 25 September 2022) Netherlands 2–4 (a.e.t.) Croatia (Rotterdam, Netherlands; 14 June 2023) Croatia 2–0 France (Split, Croatia; 20 March 2025)
Biggest Defeat	Croatia 0–7 England (Rijeka, Croatia; 3 October 2026)
Best Result	Runners-up in 2022–23
Worst Result	12th place in 2020–21

== Head-to-head records ==
The following table shows Croatia's all-time international record.

Only FIFA matches are counted. Correct as of 6 October 2026, after the match against Spain.

Opponent	Pld	W	D	L	GF	GA	GD	Win %	Points/game (Note: According to the "three points for a win" standard)	Competitive matches (Note: Legend: "W" – FIFA World Cup match; "E" – UEFA European Championship match; "N" – UEFA Nations League Finals match; "Q" – qualifying match or UEFA Nations League group stage/quarter-final match; Unless otherwise noted, in each final tournament of the World Cup, the European Championship and the Nations League (shown in bold), Croatia has played one match against the respective opponent, while in each qualifying tournament and each Nations League group stage/quarter-final, it has played two matches against the respective opponent. Friendly matches and minor tournaments are counted in the table but are not shown in this column.)
Albania	1	0	1	0	2	2	0	00.00%	1.00	**2024 E**
Andorra	6	6	0	0	24	0	+24	100.00%	3.00	2004 EQ; 2008 EQ; 2010 WQ
Argentina	6	2	1	3	7	8	–1	33.33%	1.40	**1998 W** **2018 W** **2022 W**
Armenia	3	2	1	0	3	1	+1	66.66%	2.33	2024 EQ
Australia	6	2	2	2	11	6	+5	33.33%	1.33	**2006 W**
Austria	7	6	0	1	12	6	+6	85.71%	2.57	**2008 E** 2022–23 NQ
Azerbaijan	4	2	2	0	9	2	+7	50.00%	2.00	2016 EQ; 2020 EQ
Belarus	2	2	0	0	4	1	+3	100.00%	3.00	2010 WQ
Belgium	10	3	2	5	9	8	+1	30.00%	1.1	2002 WQ; 2004 EQ; 2014 WQ; **2022 W**
Bosnia and Herzegovina	4	4	0	0	14	6	+8	100.00%	3.00	1998 WQ
Brazil	6	0	2	4	4	11	−7	0.00%	0.33	**2006 W** **2014 W** **2022 W**
Bulgaria	8	5	2	1	12	6	+6	62.50%	2.16	2004 EQ; 2006 WQ; 2016 EQ
Cameroon	1	1	0	0	4	0	+4	100.00%	3.00	**2014 W**
Canada	1	1	0	0	4	1	+3	100.00%	3.00	**2022 W**
Chile	1	0	1	0	1	1	0	00.00%	1.00	
China	1	0	1	0	1	1	0	00.00%	1.00	
Colombia	1	1	0	0	2	1	0	100.00%	4.00	
Cyprus	3	3	0	0	6	0	+6	100.00%	3.00	2022 WQ
Czech Republic	7	3	4	0	15	8	+7	42.85%	1.85	**2016 E** **2020 E** **2026 WQ**; 2026–27 NQ
Denmark	8	4	2	2	11	8	+3	50.00%	1.75	**1996 E** 1998 WQ; **2018 W** 2022–23 NQ
Ecuador	1	0	0	1	0	1	−1	00.00%	0.00	**2002 W**
Egypt	2	1	1	0	6	4	+2	50.00%	2.00	
England	13	3	2	8	15	33	−18	23.07%	0.84	**2004 E** 2008 EQ; 2010 WQ; **2018 W** 2018–19 NQ; **2020 E** **2026 W** 2026–27 NQ
Estonia	9	6	2	1	16	5	+11	66.67%	2.22	1996 EQ; 2004 EQ; 2008 EQ
Faroe Islands	2	2	0	0	4	1	+3	100%	3.00	2026 WQ
Finland	2	1	1	0	2	1	+1	50.00%	2.00	2018 WQ
FR Yugoslavia (Note: No longer active)	2	0	2	0	2	2	0	00.00%	1.00	2000 EQ
France	12	2	3	7	12	22	−10	16.67%	0.75	**1998 W** **2004 E** **2018 W** 2020–21 NQ; 2022–23 NQ; 2024–25 NQ
Georgia	3	2	0	1	4	3	+1	66.67%	2.00	2012 EQ
Germany	5	2	1	2	8	6	+2	40.00%	1.40	**1996 E** **1998 W** **2008 E**
Ghana	1	1	0	0	2	1	+1	100%	3.00	**2026 W**
Gibraltar	3	3	0	0	14	0	+14	100.00%	3.00	2026 WQ
Greece	8	2	4	2	10	9	+1	25.00%	1.25	1998 WQ; 2012 EQ; 2018 WQ
Hong Kong	1	1	0	0	4	0	+4	100.00%	3.00	
Hungary	9	4	4	1	17	7	+10	44.44%	1.78	2006 WQ; 2020 EQ
Iceland	7	5	1	1	13	3	+10	71.43%	2.26	2006 WQ; 2014 WQ; 2018 WQ; **2018 W**
Iran	2	1	1	0	4	2	+2	50.00%	2.00	
Israel	9	8	1	0	22	8	+14	88.89%	2.78	2008 EQ; 2012 EQ
Italy	9	3	6	0	11	7	+4	33.33%	1.66	1996 EQ; **2002 W** **2012 E** 2016 EQ; **2024 E**
Jamaica	1	1	0	0	3	1	+2	100.00%	3.00	**1998 W**
Japan	4	1	2	1	5	5	0	25.00%	1.33	**1998 W** **2006 W** **2022 W**
Jordan	1	1	0	0	2	1	+1	100.00%	3.00	
Kazakhstan	2	2	0	0	5	1	+4	100.00%	3.00	2010 WQ
Kosovo	2	2	0	0	7	0	+7	100.00%	3.00	2018 WQ
Latvia	6	6	0	0	17	1	+16	100.00%	3.00	2002 WQ; 2012 EQ; 2024 EQ
Liechtenstein	2	2	0	0	8	2	+6	100.00%	3.00	
Lithuania	2	1	1	0	2	0	+2	50.00%	2.00	1996 EQ
Mali	1	1	0	0	2	1	+1	100.00%	3.00	
Malta	10	9	1	0	29	5	+24	90.00%	2.80	2000 EQ; 2006 WQ; 2012 EQ; 2016 EQ; 2022 WQ
Mexico	6	4	0	2	9	6	+3	66.67%	2.00	**2002 W** **2014 W**
Moldova	2	2	0	0	2	0	+2	100.00%	3.00	
Montenegro	2	2	0	0	7	2	+5	100.00%	3.00	2026 WQ
Morocco	3	1	2	0	4	3	+1	33.33%	1.00	**2022 W** **2022 W**
Netherlands	3	2	0	1	6	6	0	66.67%	2.00	**1998 W** **2022–23 N**
Nigeria	1	1	0	0	2	0	+2	100.00%	3.00	**2018 W**
North Macedonia	9	6	2	1	14	9	+5	66.66%	2.22	2000 EQ; 2008 EQ; 2014 WQ
Northern Ireland	1	1	0	0	3	0	+3	100.00%	3.00	
Norway	5	3	1	1	10	6	+4	60.00%	2.00	2016 EQ
Panama	1	1	0	0	1	0	+1	100%	3.00	**2026 W**
Peru	1	1	0	0	2	0	+2	100%	3.00	
Poland	7	4	2	1	11	6	+5	57.14%	2.00	**2008 E** 2024–25 NQ
Portugal	11	1	2	8	9	21	−12	9.91%	0.54	**1996 E** **2016 E** 2020–21 NQ; **2024 E** 2024–25 NQ; **2026 W**
Qatar	1	1	0	0	3	2	+1	100.00%	3.00	
Republic of Ireland	7	2	3	2	8	8	0	28.57%	1.29	2000 EQ; **2012 E**
Romania	3	3	0	0	4	1	+3	100.00%	3.00	**1998 W**
Russia	6	2	4	0	6	3	+3	33.33%	1.67	2008 EQ; **2018 W** 2022 WQ
San Marino	3	3	0	0	18	0	+18	100.00%	3.00	2002 WQ
Saudi Arabia	1	1	0	0	1	0	+1	100.00%	3.00	
Scotland	8	2	3	3	7	8	–1	25.00%	1.25	2002 WQ; 2014 WQ; **2020 E** 2024–25 NQ
Senegal	1	1	0	0	2	1	+1	100.00%	3.00	
Serbia	2	1	1	0	3	1	+2	50.00%	2.00	2014 WQ
Slovakia	10	5	3	2	18	11	+7	50.00%	1.80	2020 EQ; 2022 WQ
Slovenia	12	7	4	1	21	11	+10	58.33%	2.08	1996 EQ; 1998 WQ; 2004 EQ; 2022 WQ
South Korea	7	3	2	2	11	7	+4	42.86%	1.57	
Spain	13	3	2	8	14	29	−15	23.07%	0.84	**2012 E** **2016 E** 2018–19 NQ; **2020 E** **2022–23 N** **2024 E** **2026–27 NQ**
Sweden	6	4	0	2	8	7	+1	66.67%	2.00	2006 WQ; 2020–21 NQ
Switzerland	4	1	2	1	6	7	–1	25.00%	1.25	**2004 E**
Tunisia	2	0	1	1	1	2	−1	00.00%	0.00	
Turkey	12	4	6	2	15	10	+5	33.33%	1.50	**1996 E** **2008 E** 2012 EQ; **2016 E** 2018 WQ; 2024 EQ
Ukraine	9	5	3	1	15	5	+10	55.56%	2.00	1996 EQ; 1998 WQ; 2010 WQ; 2018 WQ
Wales	8	4	3	1	12	7	+5	50.00%	1.87	2014 WQ; 2020 EQ; 2024 EQ
Total: 80 teams played	384	200	101	83	653	390	+263	52.08%	1.82	

== World ranking statistics ==
The following is a chart of yearly averages of Croatia's FIFA World Ranking. Upon admission to FIFA in 1994, Croatia entered the World Ranking at 125th. Their debut World Cup campaign, during 1998, propelled Croatia to third place after the tournament, marking the fastest ascension in FIFA ranking history. It hit a then-record Elo rating of 2,006 points in July 1998 and maintained third place until February 1999. The national team recorded its highest Elo rating in June 2023 with 2,012 points. With an average Elo rating of 1,877 points, Croatia maintained the sixth-highest average rating in the world in 2022. As of June 2026, Croatia maintains an Elo Rating of 1,912. They are one of three teams—along with Colombia and France—to be named FIFA Best Mover of the Year more than once, winning the award in 1994 and 1998.

View source data.

== See also ==
- Croatia national football team results
- History of the Croatia national football team
- List of Croatia national football team hat-tricks
- List of Croatia international footballers born outside Croatia
