= Work rate =

Concept in association football

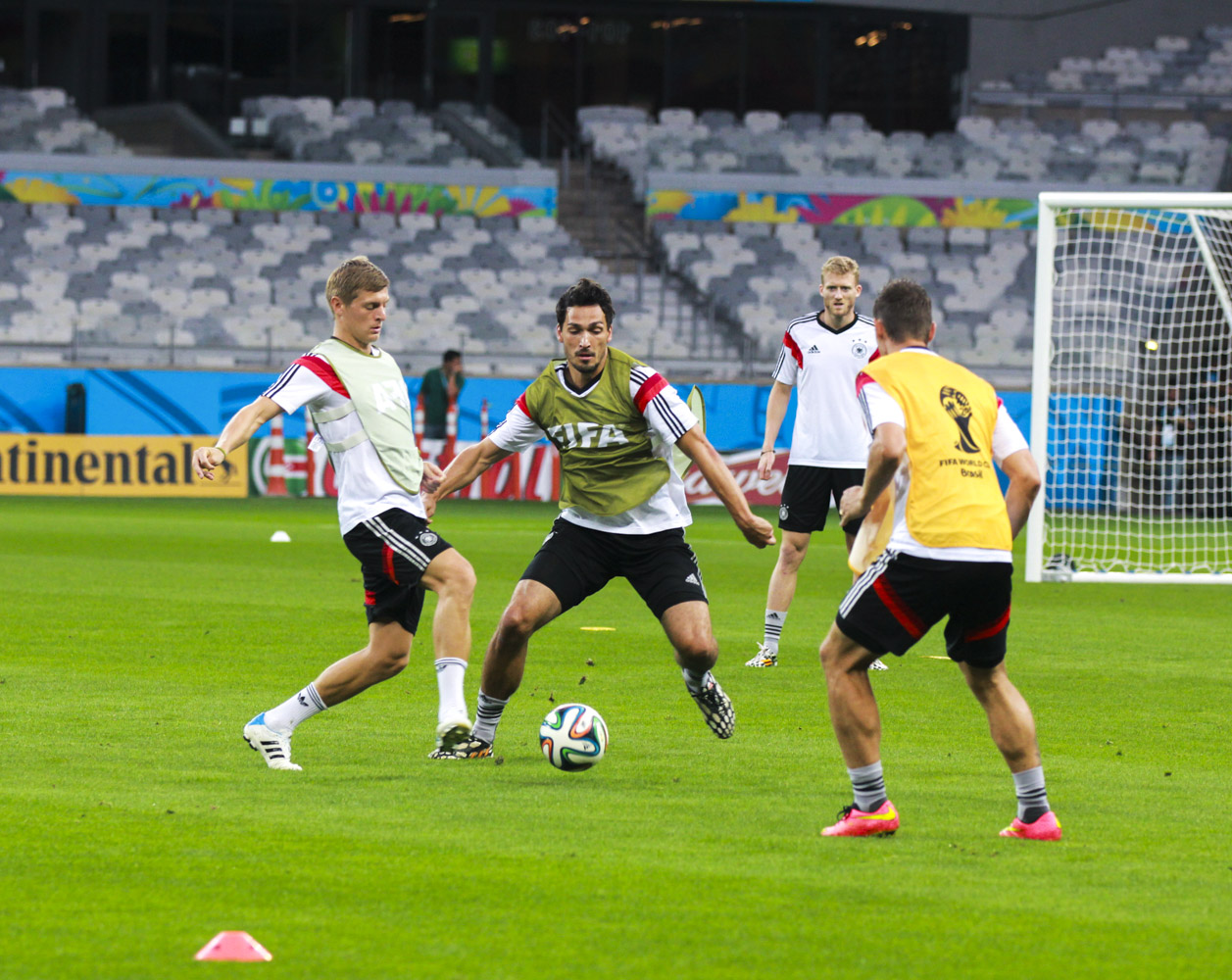
Germany simulating game-play during a training session at the 2014 FIFA World Cup, demonstrating varying levels of work rate.

In association football, work rate refers to the extent to which a player contributes to running and chasing in a match while not in possession of the ball. Work rate is generally indicated by the distance covered by a player during a match. It indicates how actively a player presses, tracks defensive movement, and supports the attack. It is considered an important metric for the midfield and midfielders as well as substitute players.

The evaluation of work rate has evolved over time. A high work rate is valued because players with this characteristic will be able to play a more active role in defending and attacking throughout a match. Players with low work rate sometimes criticized media, supporters or team management. Former Brazil and São Paulo youth coach Carlos de Lorenzi warned against equating high work rate with high talent or match results given lack of historical correlation. Argentine forward Lionel Messi is emblematic of a low work rate player who instead prioritizes energy conservation as well as high-impact runs in matches played for Argentina.

An individual player's work rate may set records and has contributed to increased competitive success. Former Spanish midfielder Xavi ran almost 12 km, more than any other player, during the 2010–11 UEFA Champions League final for Spain. During the 2010 FIFA World Cup final, he covered a distance of 14.98 km. Similarly, Croatian midfielder Petar Sučić went on to set a national record for a top speed of 36.8 km/h (22 mph) and distance traveled 17.94 kilometers (11.14 miles) playing for Croatia in 2026. Former German midfielder Philipp Lahm highlighted the lackluster work rate of Germany during the 2026 FIFA World Cup as justification for their inability to advance past the round of 32.
