= List of international goals scored by Davor Šuker =

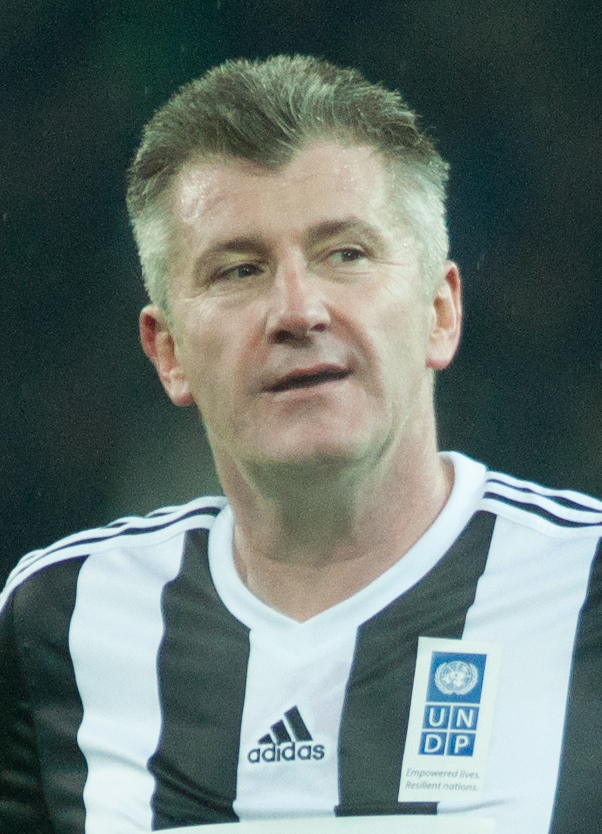
Šuker scored 45 international goals in 68 FIFA-recognised caps for Croatia.

Davor Šuker is a Croatian former professional footballer who primarily represented the Croatia national football team. A prolific striker, he has been Croatia's top goalscorer since 1998. He briefly represented Yugoslavia in two matches in 1991, scoring one goal against the Faroe Islands. Šuker made his unofficial debut for Croatia on 22 December 1990, against Romania. It was Croatia's second game since reforming the national football association in the early 1990s; the team previously had not played a match since 1956. Šuker made his official debut for Croatia on 22 October 1992 during a friendly match against Mexico at the Stadion Maksimir, in which he scored two goals.

During his career with Croatia, Šuker made 68 FIFA-recognised appearances, (Note: Does not include match for Croatia against Romania on 22 December 1990, which was not recognised by FIFA. He did not score in the match.) scoring a record 45 international goals. On 3 September 1995, he surpassed Franjo Wölfl's record of 12 goals when he scored a hat-trick against Estonia at the Stadion Maksimir. This was one of two hat-tricks he scored at the international level, the other occurring in a friendly against Australia at the same stadium in June 1998. Šuker's goals helped Croatia qualify for UEFA Euro 1996, the 1998 FIFA World Cup and the 2002 FIFA World Cup. The 12 goals he scored during Croatia's UEFA Euro 1996 qualification campaign was a tournament record until it was surpassed by David Healy, who scored 13 goals for Northern Ireland's UEFA Euro 2008 qualification campaign. During the 1998 FIFA World Cup in France, he won the Golden Boot after scoring six goals, helping Croatia reach third place and their first World Cup medal. He scored his final international goal against Bosnia and Herzegovina on 17 April 2002, and made his final appearance for Croatia against Mexico at the 2002 FIFA World Cup.

Based on his international performances and club career with European giants such as Arsenal, Real Madrid and Sevilla, Šuker is often regarded as a "legend" in Croatian sporting history. In 2004, he was selected by Brazilian former footballer Pelé as one of the 125 "greatest living footballers". Following his retirement, he was elected president of the Croatian Football Federation from 2012 to 2021, and has served as a member of the UEFA Executive Committee.

== Goals ==
Scores and results list his team's goal tally first, score column indicates score after each Šuker goal.

Table key
| Indicates that his team won the match |
| Indicates the match ended in a draw |
| Indicates that his team lost the match |

List of international goals scored by Davor Šuker
| No. | Team | Date | Venue | Opponent | Score | Result | Competition | Ref. |
|---|---|---|---|---|---|---|---|---|
| 1 | Yugoslavia | 16 May 1991 | Stadion Crvena Zvezda, Belgrade, Yugoslavia | Faroe Islands | 7–0 | 7–0 | UEFA Euro 1992 qualification | |
| 2 | Croatia | 22 October 1992 | Stadion Maksimir, Zagreb, Croatia | Mexico | 1–0 | 3–0 | Friendly | |
| 3 | Croatia | 22 October 1992 | Stadion Maksimir, Zagreb, Croatia | Mexico | 3–0 | 3–0 | Friendly | |
| 4 | Croatia | 25 June 1993 | Stadion Maksimir, Zagreb, Croatia | Ukraine | 1–0 | 3–1 | Friendly | |
| 5 | Croatia | 23 March 1994 | Estadio de Mestalla, Valencia, Spain | Spain | 2–0 | 2–0 | Friendly | |
| 6 | Croatia | 4 September 1994 | Kadrioru Staadion, Tallinn, Estonia | Estonia | 1–0 | 2–0 | UEFA Euro 1996 qualification | |
| 7 | Croatia | 4 September 1994 | Kadrioru Staadion, Tallinn, Estonia | Estonia | 2–0 | 2–0 | UEFA Euro 1996 qualification | |
| 8 | Croatia | 16 November 1994 | Stadio La Favorita, Palermo, Italy | Italy | 1–0 | 2–1 | UEFA Euro 1996 qualification | |
| 9 | Croatia | 16 November 1994 | Stadio La Favorita, Palermo, Italy | Italy | 2–0 | 2–1 | UEFA Euro 1996 qualification | |
| 10 | Croatia | 25 March 1995 | Stadion Maksimir, Zagreb, Croatia | Ukraine | 2–0 | 4–0 | UEFA Euro 1996 qualification | |
| 11 | Croatia | 25 March 1995 | Stadion Maksimir, Zagreb, Croatia | Ukraine | 4–0 | 4–0 | UEFA Euro 1996 qualification | |
| 12 | Croatia | 26 April 1995 | Stadion Maksimir, Zagreb, Croatia | Slovenia | 2–0 | 2–0 | UEFA Euro 1996 qualification | |
| 13 | Croatia | 3 September 1995 | Stadion Maksimir, Zagreb, Croatia | Estonia | 2–1 | 7–1 | UEFA Euro 1996 qualification | |
| 14 | Croatia | 3 September 1995 | Stadion Maksimir, Zagreb, Croatia | Estonia | 5–1 | 7–1 | UEFA Euro 1996 qualification | |
| 15 | Croatia | 3 September 1995 | Stadion Maksimir, Zagreb, Croatia | Estonia | 7–1 | 7–1 | UEFA Euro 1996 qualification | |
| 16 | Croatia | 8 October 1995 | Stadion Poljud, Split, Croatia | Italy | 1–1 | 1–1 | UEFA Euro 1996 qualification | |
| 17 | Croatia | 15 November 1995 | Bežigrad Stadium, Ljubljana, Slovenia | Slovenia | 1–1 | 2–1 | UEFA Euro 1996 qualification | |
| 18 | Croatia | 10 April 1996 | Gradski Vrt Stadium, Osijek, Croatia | Hungary | 2–0 | 4–1 | Friendly | |
| 19 | Croatia | 2 June 1996 | Lansdowne Road, Dublin, Ireland | Republic of Ireland | 1–0 | 2–2 | Friendly | |
| 20 | Croatia | 16 June 1996 | Hillsborough Stadium, Sheffield, England | Denmark | 1–0 | 3–0 | UEFA Euro 1996 | |
| 21 | Croatia | 16 June 1996 | Hillsborough Stadium, Sheffield, England | Denmark | 3–0 | 3–0 | UEFA Euro 1996 | |
| 22 | Croatia | 23 June 1996 | Old Trafford, Manchester, England | Germany | 1–1 | 1–2 | UEFA Euro 1996 | |
| 23 | Croatia | 10 November 1996 | Stadion Maksimir, Zagreb, Croatia | Greece | 1–1 | 1–1 | 1998 FIFA World Cup qualification | |
| 24 | Croatia | 29 March 1997 | Stadion Poljud, Split, Croatia | Denmark | 1–0 | 1–1 | 1998 FIFA World Cup qualification | |
| 25 | Croatia | 30 April 1997 | Kaftanzoglio Stadium, Thessaloniki, Greece | Greece | 1–0 | 1–0 | 1998 FIFA World Cup qualification | |
| 26 | Croatia | 10 September 1997 | Parken Stadium, Copenhagen, Denmark | Denmark | 1–3 | 1–3 | 1998 FIFA World Cup qualification | |
| 27 | Croatia | 11 October 1997 | Bežigrad Stadium, Ljubljana, Slovenia | Slovenia | 1–0 | 3–1 | 1998 FIFA World Cup qualification | |
| 28 | Croatia | 3 June 1998 | Stadion Kantrida, Rijeka, Croatia | Iran | 2–0 | 2–0 | Friendly | |
| 29 | Croatia | 6 June 1998 | Stadion Maksimir, Zagreb, Croatia | Australia | 1–0 | 7–0 | Friendly | |
| 30 | Croatia | 6 June 1998 | Stadion Maksimir, Zagreb, Croatia | Australia | 2–0 | 7–0 | Friendly | |
| 31 | Croatia | 6 June 1998 | Stadion Maksimir, Zagreb, Croatia | Australia | 5–0 | 7–0 | Friendly | |
| 32 | Croatia | 14 June 1998 | Stade Félix Bollaert, Lens, France | Jamaica | 3–1 | 3–1 | 1998 FIFA World Cup | |
| 33 | Croatia | 20 June 1998 | Stade de la Beaujoire, Nantes, France | Japan | 1–0 | 1–0 | 1998 FIFA World Cup | |
| 34 | Croatia | 30 June 1998 | Stade du Parc Lescure, Bordeaux, France | Romania | 1–0 | 1–0 | 1998 FIFA World Cup | |
| 35 | Croatia | 4 July 1998 | Stade de Gerland, Lyon, France | Germany | 3–0 | 3–0 | 1998 FIFA World Cup | |
| 36 | Croatia | 8 July 1998 | Stade de France, Saint-Denis, France | France | 1–0 | 1–2 | 1998 FIFA World Cup | |
| 37 | Croatia | 11 July 1998 | Parc des Princes, Paris, France | Netherlands | 2–1 | 2–1 | 1998 FIFA World Cup | |
| 38 | Croatia | 10 October 1998 | Grawnd Nazzjonali, Ta' Qali, Malta | Malta | 4–1 | 4–1 | UEFA Euro 2000 qualification | |
| 39 | Croatia | 14 October 1998 | Stadion Maksimir, Zagreb, Croatia | Macedonia | 1–1 | 3–2 | UEFA Euro 2000 qualification | |
| 40 | Croatia | 10 March 1999 | Olympiakó Stádio Athinon, Athens, Greece | Greece | 2–2 | 2–3 | Friendly | |
| 41 | Croatia | 5 May 1999 | Estadio Olímpico de Sevilla, Seville, Spain | Spain | 1–0 | 1–3 | Friendly | |
| 42 | Croatia | 5 June 1999 | Stadion Gradski, Skopje, Macedonia | Macedonia | 1–0 | 1–1 | UEFA Euro 2000 qualification | |
| 43 | Croatia | 4 September 1999 | Stadion Maksimir, Zagreb, Croatia | Republic of Ireland | 1–0 | 1–0 | UEFA Euro 2000 qualification | |
| 44 | Croatia | 2 June 2001 | Stadion Varteks, Varaždin, Croatia | San Marino | 3–0 | 4–0 | 2002 FIFA World Cup qualification | |
| 45 | Croatia | 15 August 2001 | Lansdowne Road, Dublin, Ireland | Republic of Ireland | 2–2 | 2–2 | Friendly | |
| 46 | Croatia | 17 April 2002 | Stadion Maksimir, Zagreb, Croatia | Bosnia and Herzegovina | 2–0 | 2–0 | Friendly | |

== Hat-tricks ==
List of international hat-tricks scored by Davor Šuker
| No. | Team | Opponent | Goals | Score | Venue | Competition | Date | Ref. |
|---|---|---|---|---|---|---|---|---|
| 1 | Croatia | Estonia | 3 – (2–1, 5–1, 7–1) | 7–1 | Stadion Maksimir, Zagreb, Croatia | UEFA Euro 1996 qualification | 3 September 1995 | |
| 2 | Croatia | Australia | 3 – (1–0, 2–0, 5–0) | 7–0 | Stadion Maksimir, Zagreb, Croatia | Friendly | 6 June 1998 | |

== Statistics ==
Appearances and goals by national team and year
| National team | Year | Competitive | | Friendly | | Total | |
| National team | Year | Apps | Goals | Apps | Goals | Apps | Goals |
|---|---|---|---|---|---|---|---|
| Yugoslavia | 1991 | 1 (Note: Appearance(s) in UEFA European Championship qualification) | 1 | 1 | 0 | 2 | 1 |
| Croatia | 1992 | — | | 1 | 2 | 1 | 2 |
| Croatia | 1993 | — | | 1 | 1 | 1 | 1 |
| Croatia | 1994 | 3 | 4 | 2 | 1 | 5 | 5 |
| Croatia | 1995 | 7 | 8 | — | | 7 | 8 |
| Croatia | 1996 | 6 (Note: Four appearances and 3 goals in UEFA European Championship, two appearances and one goal in FIFA World Cup qualification) | 4 | 4 | 2 | 10 | 6 |
| Croatia | 1997 | 7 (Note: Appearance(s) in FIFA World Cup qualification) | 4 | 0 | 0 | 7 | 4 |
| Croatia | 1998 | 9 (Note: Seven appearances and six goals in FIFA World Cup, two appearances and two goals in UEFA European Championship qualification) | 8 | 4 | 4 | 13 | 12 |
| Croatia | 1999 | 5 | 2 | 4 | 2 | 9 | 4 |
| Croatia | 2000 | 1 | 0 | 3 | 0 | 4 | 0 |
| Croatia | 2001 | 5 | 1 | 3 | 1 | 8 | 2 |
| Croatia | 2002 | 1 (Note: Appearance in FIFA World Cup) | 0 | 2 | 1 | 3 | 1 |
| Croatia | Total | 44 | 31 | 24 | 14 | 68 | 45 |
| Career total | | 45 | 32 | 25 | 14 | 70 | 46 |

Caps and goals by competition
| Competition | Caps | Goals |
|---|---|---|
| Friendlies | 25 | 14 |
| FIFA World Cup | 8 | 6 |
| UEFA European Championship | 4 | 3 |
| FIFA World Cup qualification | 15 | 6 |
| UEFA Euro qualification | 18 | 17 |
| Total | 70 | 46 |

Goals by opponent
| Opponent | Goals |
|---|---|
| Estonia | 5 |
| Denmark | 4 |
| Australia | 3 |
| Greece | 3 |
| Italy | 3 |
| Republic of Ireland | 3 |
| Slovenia | 3 |
| Ukraine | 3 |
| Germany | 2 |
| Macedonia | 2 |
| Mexico | 2 |
| Spain | 2 |
| Bosnia and Herzegovina | 1 |
| Faroe Islands | 1 |
| France | 1 |
| Hungary | 1 |
| Iran | 1 |
| Jamaica | 1 |
| Japan | 1 |
| Malta | 1 |
| Netherlands | 1 |
| Romania | 1 |
| San Marino | 1 |
| Total | 46 |

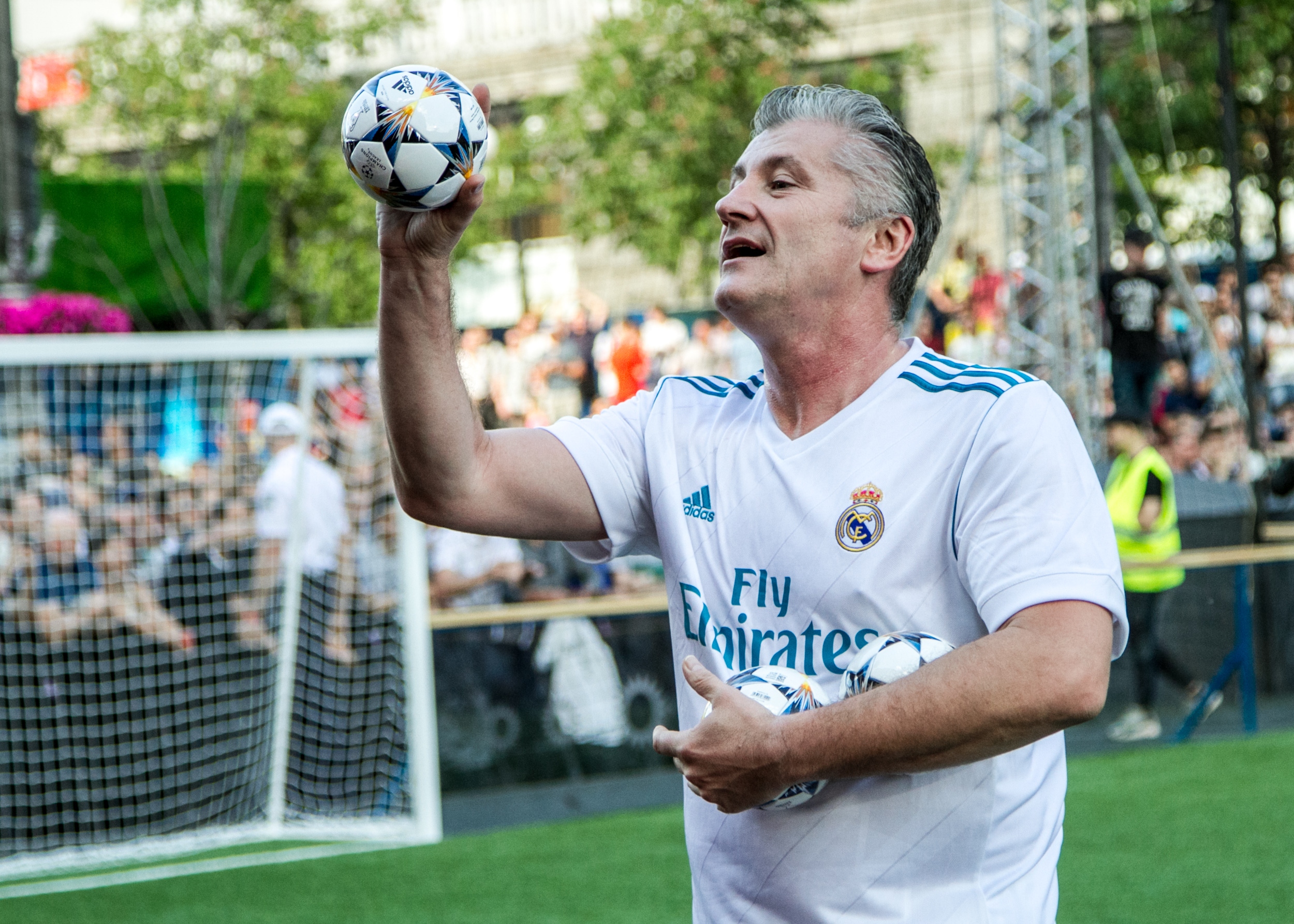
Šuker scored two international hat-tricks for Croatia; they were scored against Estonia and Australia in 1995 and 1998 respectively.

== See also ==
- List of top international men's football goal scorers by country
- Croatia national football team records and statistics
- List of Croatia national football team hat-tricks
