= List of Croatia international footballers born outside Croatia =

This is a list of the Croatian football players who played for the Croatia national football team born outside Croatia. This list is inclusive of both naturalized and dual citizen players. There is a separate list for Croatian football players born in Croatia.

Players in bold are currently playing for the Croatia national football team or active, in brackets there are their caps. The list is updated as 16 November 2026.

== Australia ==
- Joey Didulica 2004–2006 (4) (0)
- Anthony Šerić 1998–2006 (16) (0)
- Josip Šimunić 2001–2013 (105) (3)

== Austria ==
- **Franjo Ivanović** 2025– (12) (2)
- **Mateo Kovačić** 2013– (123) (5)
- **Luka Sučić** 2021– (23) (1)

== Bosnia and Herzegovina ==
=== Austria-Hungary ===
- Miroslav Brozović 1940–1944 (17) (0)
- Mirko Kokotović 1941–1944 (15) (2)
- Antun Pogačnik 1941 (1) (0)
- Sulejman Rebac 1956 (1) (2)
- Aleksandar Živković 1940 (1) (0)

=== (Federal Republic of Yugoslavia) Kingdom of Yugoslavia ===
- Florijan Matekalo 1940 (4) (1)

=== (Socialist Federal Republic of Yugoslavia) SFR Yugoslavia ===
- Mladen Bartulović 2006–2009 (2) (0)
- Mario Bazina 2002 (1) (0)
- Stanko Bubalo 1999–2000 (2) (0)
- **Ante Budimir** 2020– (44) (7)
- Nino Bule 1999–2004 (3) (0)
- Vedran Ćorluka 2006–2018 (103) (4)
- Darko Dražić 1990–1991 (2) (0)
- Sejad Halilović 1994 (1) (0)
- Mato Jajalo 2014–2015
- Nikica Jelavić 2009–2014 (36) (6)
- Vedran Ješe 2006–2008 (2) (0)
- Krunoslav Jurčić 1997–2000 (21) (0)
- Goran Jurić 1997–1999 (15) (0)
- **Marin Leovac** 2014–2019 (5) (0)
- Dejan Lovren 2009–2022 (78) (5)
- Mato Neretljak 2001–2006 (10) (1)
- Željko Pavlović 1996–2001 (7) (0)
- Mladen Petrić 2001–2013 (45) (13)
- Mladen Romić 1992 (3) (0)
- Mario Stanić 1995–2003 (49) (7)
- Mario Tokić 1998–2006 (28) (0)
- Stjepan Tomas 1998–2006 (49) (1)
- Boris Živković 1999–2007 (39) (2)

=== (Bosnia and Herzegovina) Born after Bosnia's Independence from Yugoslavia ===
- **Jakov Filipović** 2017– (3) (0)
- Nikola Katić 2017 (1) (0)
- **Mirko Marić** 2017– (1) (0)
- **Petar Sučić** 2024– (27) (3)
- Ivan Šunjić 2017– (1) (0)
- **Josip Šutalo** 2022– (40) (0)

== Brazil ==
- Eduardo da Silva 2004–2014 (64) (29)
- Sammir 2012–2014 (7) (0)

== Germany ==
=== West Germany ===
- Ivo Iličević 2010–2013 (9) (1)
- Niko Kovač 1996–2008 (83) (14)
- Robert Kovač 1999–2009 (84) (0)
- Ivan Klasnić 2004–2011 (41) (12)
- Marijo Marić 2002–2004 (8) (1)
- Tomislav Marić 2002–2003 (9) (2)
- Robert Prosinečki 1994–2002 (49) (10)
- Filip Tapalović 2002 (3) (0)
- Vladimir Vasilj 1998–2002 (2) (0)

=== (Germany) Born after German reunification ===
- Antonio Čolak 2020–2021 (3) (0)
- **Igor Matanović** 2024– (17) (2)
- **Marco Pašalić** 2023– (22) (2)
- **Mario Pašalić** 2014– (94) (12)
- **Marin Pongračić** 2020– (24) (0)
- **Josip Stanišić** 2021– (40) (0)

== Kosovo ==
=== (Socialist Federal Republic of Yugoslavia) SFR Yugoslavia ===
- Ardian Kozniku 1994–1998 (7) (2)
- Kujtim Shala 1990 (1) (0)

== Montenegro ==
=== (Socialist Federal Republic of Yugoslavia) SFR Yugoslavia ===
- Dževad Turković 1994–1995 (6) (0)

== Serbia ==
=== Austria-Hungary ===
- Svetozar Džanić 1941 (1) (0)

== Slovenia ==
=== (Federal Republic of Yugoslavia) Kingdom of Yugoslavia ===
- Antun Lokošek 1944 (1) (1)

=== (Socialist Federal Republic of Yugoslavia) SFR Yugoslavia ===
- Srebrenko Posavec 2006 (1) (0)
- Gregor Židan 1990 (1) (0)

== Switzerland ==
- **Martin Baturina** 2023– (27) (2)
- Ivan Rakitić 2007–2019 (106) (15)

== United States of America ==
- Zvonko Jazbec 1940 (3) (1)

== Records ==
This section is only about players born outside Croatia. Players in bold are currently active.

=== Most capped players ===
#	Player	Period	Caps	Goals	Birthplace
1	**Mateo Kovačić**	2013–	123	5	Austria
2	Ivan Rakitić	2007–2019	106	15	Switzerland
3	Josip Šimunić	2001–2013	105	3	Australia
4	Vedran Ćorluka	2006–2018	103	4	Bosnia and Herzegovina (then part of (Socialist Federal Republic of Yugoslavia) SFR Yugoslavia)
5	**Mario Pašalić**	2014–	94	12	Germany
6	Robert Kovač	1999–2009	84	0	Germany (then West Germany)
7	Niko Kovač	1996–2008	83	14	Germany (then West Germany)
8	Dejan Lovren	2009–2022	78	5	Bosnia and Herzegovina (then part of (Socialist Federal Republic of Yugoslavia) SFR Yugoslavia)
9	Eduardo Da Silva	2004–2014	64	29	Brazil
10	Robert Prosinečki	1994–2002	49	10	Germany (then West Germany)
10	Mario Stanić	1995–2003	49	7	Bosnia and Herzegovina (then part of (Socialist Federal Republic of Yugoslavia) SFR Yugoslavia)
10	Stjepan Tomas	1998–2006	49	1	Bosnia and Herzegovina (then part of (Socialist Federal Republic of Yugoslavia) SFR Yugoslavia)

=== Top goalscorers ===
#	Player	Goals	Birthplace
1	Eduardo Da Silva	29	Brazil
2	Ivan Rakitić	15	Switzerland
3	Niko Kovač	14	Germany (then West Germany)
4	Mladen Petrić	13	Bosnia and Herzegovina (then part of (Socialist Federal Republic of Yugoslavia) SFR Yugoslavia)
5	Ivan Klasnić	12	Germany (then West Germany)
5	**Mario Pašalić**	12	Germany
7	Robert Prosinečki	10	Germany (then West Germany)
8	Mario Stanić	7	Bosnia and Herzegovina (then part of (Socialist Federal Republic of Yugoslavia) SFR Yugoslavia)
8	**Ante Budimir**	7	Bosnia and Herzegovina (then part of (Socialist Federal Republic of Yugoslavia) SFR Yugoslavia)
10	Nikica Jelavić	6	Bosnia and Herzegovina (then part of (Socialist Federal Republic of Yugoslavia) SFR Yugoslavia)

== Stats by country of birth ==
Country	Total
Bosnia and Herzegovina	35
Germany	14
Australia	3
Austria	3
Slovenia	3
Brazil	2
Kosovo	2
Switzerland	2
Montenegro	1
Serbia	1
United States	1
