= Petar Sučić =

Croatia international footballer (born 2003)

- Sučić with Croatia in 2026

Personal information
- Date of birth: 25 October 2003 (age 23)
- Place of birth: Livno, Bosnia and Herzegovina
- Height: 1.83 m (6 ft 0 in)
- Position: Midfielder

Team information
- Current team: Inter Milan
- Number: 8

Youth career
- 2013–2018: NK Sportprevent Bugojno
- 2018–2020: Iskra Bugojno
- 2020–2022: Zrinjski Mostar

Senior career*
Years	Team	Apps	(Gls)
2022–2025	Dinamo Zagreb	51	(6)
2022–2023	→ Zrinjski Mostar (loan)	27	(0)
2025–	Inter Milan	45	(4)

International career^{‡}
2021–2022	Bosnia and Herzegovina U19	16	(0)
2022–2023	Bosnia and Herzegovina U21	8	(0)
2024–	Croatia	27	(3)
- * Club domestic league appearances and goals as of 22:32, 22 November 2026 (UTC) ‡ National team caps and goals as of 23:30, 15 November 2026 (UTC)

Petar Sučić (born 25 October 2003) is a professional footballer who plays as a midfielder for Serie A club Inter Milan. Born in Bosnia and Herzegovina, he plays for the Croatia national team. He is known for his speed, endurance, and work rate, setting multiple records for distance covered and sprinting.

Sučić began his career with Dinamo Zagreb, where he won three trophies before moving to Inter Milan for a fee of €14 million in 2025. In his first season at Inter, he won a domestic double, claiming both the Serie A and Coppa Italia titles.

== Club career ==
=== Dinamo Zagreb ===
Sučić started playing football at a local club, before joining Iskra Bugojno's youth setup in 2018. In 2020, he switched to Zrinjski Mostar's youth academy. In January 2022, he signed a five-year deal with Croatian side Dinamo Zagreb.

In June, he was sent on a season-long loan to his former team Zrinjski Mostar. He made his professional debut in a UEFA Champions League qualifier against Sheriff Tiraspol on 6 July at the age of 18.

Sučić made his official debut for Dinamo Zagreb in the 2023 Croatian Super Cup game against their biggest rivals Hajduk Split on 15 July 2023 and managed to win his first trophy. A week later, he made his league debut against the same opponent.

In December 2023, he extended his contract with the club until June 2028. In May 2025, on the last match day of the Croatian League, Sučić scored the game winner in a 1–0 win against Varaždin, his last game for Dinamo.

=== Inter Milan ===
On 4 June 2025, Sučić joined Serie A club Inter Milan, signing a five-year contract worth €14 million transfer.

He made his Inter debut on 17 June impressing in a 1–1 draw with Monterrey in the 2025 FIFA Club World Cup group stage, substituting Kristjan Asllani in the 68th minute. In his first season, they won the Serie A title and Italian Cup titles in 2026.

== International career ==
He represented Bosnia and Herzegovina at various youth levels. He served as a captain of the under-19 team under coach Ivica Barbarić.

In March 2024, aged 20, he decided that he would represent Croatia instead of Bosnia and Herzegovina at the senior level.

Sučić was called up to the senior Croatia national team for the first time for the UEFA Nations League games against Portugal and Poland in September 2024. He debuted on 5 September 2024 against Portugal at Estádio da Luz. He substituted Luka Modrić in the 77th minute of the 2–1 defeat.

Sučić set a national team record – in 2–1 win over France in March 2025 – by running a total of 17.94 kilometers (11.14 miles) during the 120-minute Nations League match. During an international friendly against Brazil in March 2026, Sučić recorded Croatia's highest-ever player speed, running up to an estimated 36.8 km/h (22 mph). He won Man of the Match for his goal in Croatia's 2–1 victory over Ghana during the 2026 World Cup.

== Personal life ==
Hailing from a Bosnian Croat family, Sučić is a dual citizen of Croatia and Bosnia and Herzegovina having been born in Livno. His cousin, Luka Sučić, born in Austria, is a professional footballer.

== Career statistics ==
=== Club ===
As of match played 22 November 2026

Appearances and goals by club, season and competition
Club	Season	League			National cup (Note: Includes Bosnian Cup, Croatian Cup, Coppa Italia)		Europe		Other		Total	
Club	Season	Division	Apps	Goals	Apps	Goals	Apps	Goals	Apps	Goals	Apps	Goals
Zrinjski Mostar (loan)	2022–23	Bosnian Premier League	27	0	5	0	5 (Note: One appearance in UEFA Champions League, four appearances in UEFA Europa Conference League)	0	—		37	0
Dinamo Zagreb	2023–24	HNL	25	1	6	1	11 (Note: Three appearances in UEFA Champions League, one appearance in UEFA Europa League, seven appearances in UEFA Europa Conference League)	0	1 (Note: Appearance in Croatian Super Cup)	0	43	2
Dinamo Zagreb	2024–25	HNL	26	5	1	0	5 (Note: Appearances in UEFA Champions League)	2	—		32	7
Dinamo Zagreb	Total		51	6	7	1	16	2	1	0	75	9
Inter Milan	2024–25	Serie A	—		—		—		4 (Note: Appearances in FIFA Club World Cup)	0	4	0
Inter Milan	2025–26	Serie A	34	2	5	1	10	1	1 (Note: Appearance in Supercoppa Italiana)	0	50	4
Inter Milan	2026–27	Serie A	11	2	0	0	4	0	0	0	15	2
Inter Milan	Total		45	4	5	1	14	1	5	0	69	6
Career total			123	10	12	2	35	3	6	0	181	15

=== International ===
As of match played 15 November 2026

Appearances and goals by national team and year
National team	Year	Apps	Goals
Croatia	2024	5	1
Croatia	2025	8	0
Croatia	2026	14	2
Total		27	3

Scores and results list Croatia's goal tally first, score column indicates score after each Sučić goal.

List of international goals scored by Petar Sučić
No.	Date	Venue	Cap	Opponent	Score	Result	Competition
1	15 October 2024	Stadion Narodowy, Warsaw, Poland	4	Poland	2–1	3–3	2024–25 UEFA Nations League A
2	27 June 2026	Lincoln Financial Field, Philadelphia, United States	20	Ghana	1–0	2–1	2026 FIFA World Cup
3	12 November 2026	Wembley Stadium, London, England	26	England	1–1	1–2	2026–27 UEFA Nations League A

== Honours ==
Zrinjski Mostar

- Bosnian Premier League: 2022–23
- Bosnian Cup: 2022–23

Dinamo Zagreb

- HNL: 2023–24
- Croatian Cup: 2023–24
- Croatian Super Cup: 2023

Inter Milan

- Serie A: 2025–26
- Coppa Italia: 2025–26
