= List of Croatia national football team hat-tricks =

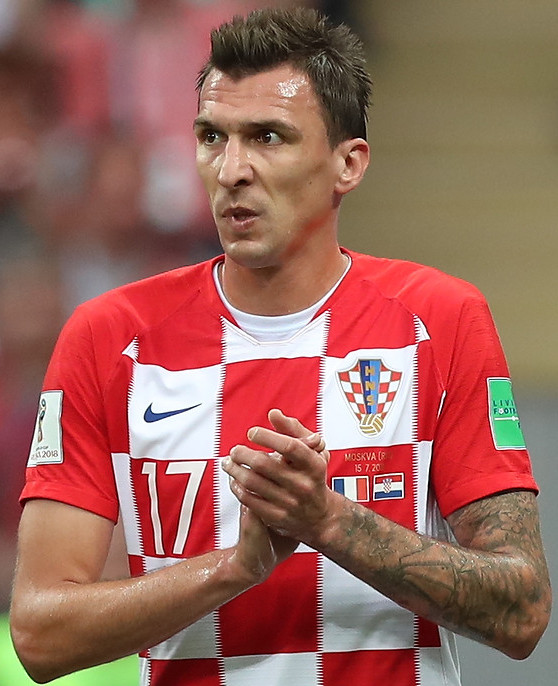
Mario Mandžukić (pictured) is the most recent hat trick goal scorer, level with Davor Šuker for most scored (2).

Since the independence of Croatia in 1990, nine Croatian footballers have scored three or more goals (a hat-trick) in a game. Davor Šuker was the first player in history to achieve this feat, scoring three times in a 7–1 victory over Estonia in 1995. He is also the one of two players alongside Mario Mandžukić who scored a hat-trick more than once, grabbing his second hat-trick in Croatia's 7–0 win against Australia. Mladen Petrić has scored the greatest number of goals in one game, netting four times against Andorra.

The most recent hat-trick was scored by Mario Mandžukić in Croatia's 6–0 victory over Kosovo in the 2018 FIFA World Cup qualification campaign. Croatia have conceded four hat-tricks since 1941, the most recent being scored by Theo Walcott in a 4–1 defeat by England in the qualifications for the 2010 FIFA World Cup.

== Hat-tricks for Croatia ==
^{4} - player has scored 4 goals

Date	Player	Opponent	Venue	Competition	Result^{[a]}	Report
3 September 1995	Davor Šuker	Estonia	Stadion Maksimir, Zagreb	UEFA Euro 1996 qualifying	7–1	HNS-CFF.hr
13 March 1996	Goran Vlaović	South Korea	Stadion Kranjčevićeva, Zagreb	Friendly	3–0	HNS-CFF.hr
6 June 1998	Davor Šuker	Australia	Stadion Maksimir, Zagreb	Friendly	7–0	HNS-CFF.hr
24 March 2001	Boško Balaban	Latvia	Stadion Gradski vrt, Osijek	2002 FIFA World Cup qualification	4–1	HNS-CFF.hr
7 October 2006	Mladen Petrić^{4}	Andorra	Stadion Maksimir, Zagreb	UEFA Euro 2008 qualifying	7–0	HNS-CFF.hr
15 November 2006	Eduardo da Silva	Israel	Ramat Gan Stadium, Ramat Gan	UEFA Euro 2008 qualifying	4–3	HNS-CFF.hr
4 June 2016	Mario Mandžukić	San Marino	Stadion Rujevica, Rijeka	Friendly	10–0	HNS-CFF.hr
4 June 2016	Nikola Kalinić	San Marino	Stadion Rujevica, Rijeka	Friendly	10–0	HNS-CFF.hr
6 October 2016	Mario Mandžukić	Kosovo	Loro Boriçi Stadium, Shkodër	2018 FIFA World Cup qualification	6–0	HNS-CFF.hr

== Hat-tricks conceded by Croatia ==
Date	Player	Opponent	Venue	Competition	Result^{[a]}	Report
2 April 1997	Primož Gliha	Slovenia	Stadion Poljud, Split	1998 FIFA World Cup qualification	3–3	Sportnet.hr
22 August 2007	Zlatan Muslimović	Bosnia and Herzegovina	Asim Ferhatović Hase Stadium, Sarajevo	Friendly	5–3	Sportnet.hr
10 September 2008	Theo Walcott	England	Stadion Maksimir, Zagreb	2010 FIFA World Cup qualification	1–4	Sportnet.hr

== Notes ==
^{a} The result is presented with Croatia's score first.
