= Rudolf Hitrec =

Croatian footballer and manager

Personal information
- Full name: Rudolf Hitrec
- Date of birth: 12 April 1903
- Place of birth: Zagreb, Croatia-Slavonia, Austria-Hungary
- Date of death: 13 January 1970 (aged 66)
- Place of death: Zagreb, SR Croatia, SFR Yugoslavia
- Position: Midfielder

Senior career*
Years	Team	Apps	(Gls)
1919–1921	Concordia		
1923–1931	Građanski	58	(6)

International career
1926	Kingdom of Serbs, Croats and Slovenes	1	(0)
- * Club domestic league appearances and goals

Rudolf Hitrec (12 April 1903 in Zagreb – 13 January 1970 in Zagreb) was a Croatian footballer and international manager.

== Club career ==
He played for Concordia Zagreb from 1919 to 1921 and Građanski Zagreb from 1921 to 1930. He won the national championship of the Kingdom of Serbs, Croats and Slovenes in 1923, 1926 and 1928.

== International career ==
Hitrec played for the Yugoslav national team once in 1926 against Bulgaria in Zagreb.

== Post-playing career ==
In 1941 he became the president of the Croatian Football Federation and also served as the manager of the Croatia national team from 1940 to 1943. After the Second World War he ended his career in football and worked at the Dubrava Clinical Hospital as a doctor.

Sporting positions
Preceded by Jozo Jakopić	Croatia national football team manager 1940-1943	Succeeded by Bogdan Cuvaj
Preceded by Ivo Kraljević	President of Croatian Football Federation; 1941	Succeeded by Vatroslav Petek
