= Cuvaj =

Cuvaj is a surname. Notable people with the surname include:

- Slavko Cuvaj (1851–1930), Croatian politician
- Bogdan Cuvaj (1905–1983), Croatian football manager
