= Croatia national football team =

Men's association football team

Croatia
- Nickname(s): Vatreni (Blazers); Kockasti (Checkered Ones)
- Association: Croatian Football Federation (HNS)
- Confederation: UEFA (Europe)
- Head coach: Slaven Bilić
- Captain: Luka Modrić
- Most caps: Luka Modrić (208)
- Top scorer: Davor Šuker (45)
- Home stadium: Various
- FIFA code: CRO
First colours	Second colours

FIFA ranking
- Current: 15 ▼1 (18 November 2026)
- Highest: 3 (July 1998)
- Lowest: 125 (March 1994)

First international
- Croatia 4–0 Switzerland (Zagreb, Croatia; 2 April 1940)

Biggest win
- Croatia 10–0 San Marino (Rijeka, Croatia; 4 June 2016)

Biggest defeat
- Croatia 0–7 England (Rijeka, Croatia; 3 October 2026)

World Cup
- Appearances: 7 (first in 1998)
- Best result: Runners-up (2018)

European Championship
- Appearances: 7 (first in 1996)
- Best result: Quarter-finals (1996, 2008)

Nations League Finals
- Appearances: 1 (first in 2023)
- Best result: Runners-up (2023)
Medal record
Men's football
FIFA World Cup
Silver medal – second place	2018 Russia	Team
Bronze medal – third place	1998 France	Team
Bronze medal – third place	2022 Qatar	Team
UEFA Nations League
Silver medal – second place	2023 Netherlands	Team
- Website: hns-cff.hr

The Croatia national football team (Croatian: Hrvatska nogometna reprezentacija) represents Croatia in men's international football matches. It is governed by the Croatian Football Federation (HNS), the governing body for football in Croatia. It is a member of UEFA in Europe and FIFA in global competition. The team's colours reference two national symbols: the Croatian chequerboard and the country's tricolour. They are colloquially known as the Vatreni (Blazers) and the Kockasti (Checkered Ones).

The Vatreni have qualified for every major tournament except UEFA Euro 2000 and the 2010 FIFA World Cup. At the World Cup, Croatia has finished second once (2018) and third on two occasions (1998, 2022), securing three World Cup medals. Davor Šuker won the Golden Shoe and the Silver Ball in 1998, while Luka Modrić won the Golden Ball in 2018 and the Bronze Ball in 2022. The team has reached the quarter-finals of the UEFA European Championship twice (1996, 2008). They finished second with a silver medals in the UEFA Nations League in 2023. Croatia recorded an all-time high Elo Rating of 2,012 in 2023.

Upon admission into FIFA in 1994 ranked 125th, they ascended to third place with their debut 1998 World Cup campaign. This marked the fastest ascension in FIFA ranking history. Croatia is the second-smallest country by population (after Uruguay) and land mass (after the Netherlands) to reach a World Cup final. At the World Cup, Croatia hold records for most penalty shoot-out played (4) and won (4) and most penalties saved in a shoot-out (3), among other team records. They were named FIFA Best Mover of the Year in 1994 and 1998, the first team to win the award twice.

== History ==
=== Official formation ===
Various unofficial sides delineated the early history of Croatian football as Croatia was not an independent entity until the late 20th century. The Croatian Football Federation has historically maintained its first official international match as the 2 April 1940 friendly contested by the Banovina of Croatia within Yugoslavia and Switzerland, where the former prevailed 4–0. That year, Jozo Jakopić led the national side representing the Banovina of Croatia in four friendly matches. Following the 1941 Axis invasion of Yugoslavia, Germany and Italy took control of Croatia, forming the Independent State of Croatia and installing Rudolf Hitrec as an unofficial manager for two years. The side played 15 friendly matches from its re-activation in FIFA in 1941 until the end of World War II. In 1945, Croatia returned to Yugoslavia as the People's Republic of Croatia with sides active until 1956. During the nation's pre-independence, Croat footballers played for Yugoslavia at the Summer Olympics, the FIFA World Cup, and the UEFA European Championship from 1956 to 1990.

Croatia debuted their modern checkered jersey – their first international match as an independent country – against the United States on 17 October 1990, winning 2–1. Caretaker manager Dražan Jerković, led the de facto national side before their formal re-admission into FIFA on 3 July 1992, winning two more friendly games against Romania in December 1990 and Slovenia in June 1991. Stanko Poklepović took over team management and led them on an exhibition tour in their debut against Australia, before he was succeeded by Vlatko Marković in April 1993. Croatia gained admission into UEFA in June 1993, three months after qualification for the 1994 World Cup started, missing their window to enter the competition. After winning a match against Ukraine in June 1993, Marković was succeeded by Miroslav Blažević in March 1994.

=== Blažević period (1994–1999) ===

Squad at 1998 World Cup
Coach: Miroslav Blažević

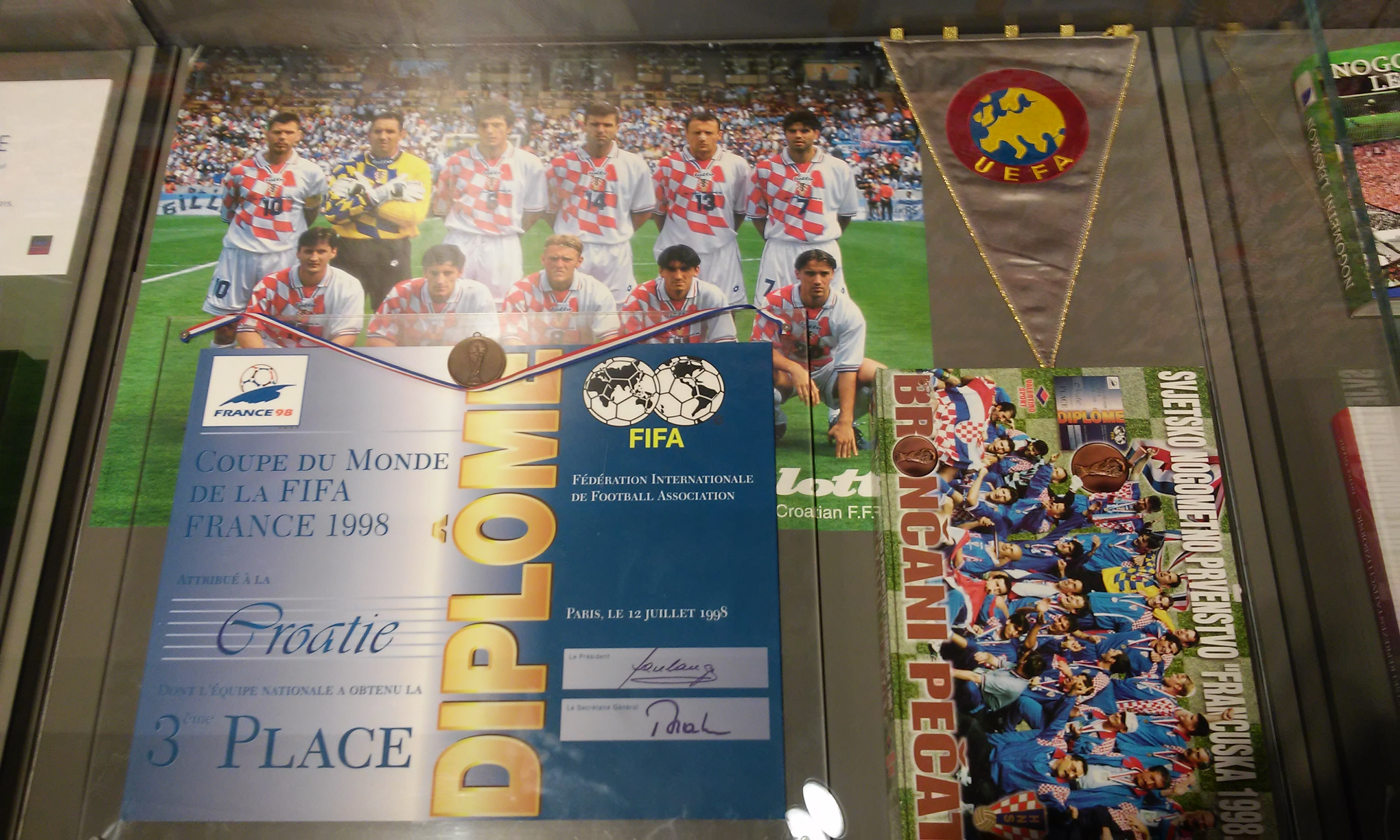
Croatia's third-place certificate and bronze medal for the 1998 World Cup

After the independence of Croatia, the newly formed Croatia entered the FIFA World Rankings in 125th place in March 1994. Blažević launched Croatia's qualifying campaign for Euro 1996 with a 2–0 win over Estonia on 4 September 1994 and a 1–0 away loss to Ukraine on 1 June 1995, their first competitive win and loss. After finishing first in qualifying, the team halved their spot in the World Ranking, ascending to number 62, winning FIFA's 1994 Best Mover of the Year in December 1994. In the Euro 1996 group stage, Goran Vlaović scored the team's first goal at a tournament, a late strike to win 1–0 against Turkey. Croatia then beat reigning champions Denmark 3–0, later losing to Portugal by the same scoreline. The team advanced to the knockout stage and were beaten in the quarter-finals 1–2 by Germany. Croatia's qualifying campaign from 1998 to 1999 for Euro 2000 was unsuccessful as they finished third in their group behind FR Yugoslavia and the Republic of Ireland. Both fixtures against Yugoslavia ended in draws which prevented Croatia from qualifying by one point.

Croatia began their qualification campaign for the 1998 World Cup led by captain Zvonimir Boban with an aggregate victory against Ukraine in the two-legged playoff. In the group stage, Croatia beat both Jamaica and Japan, later losing to Argentina to advance with them to the knockout stage. A 1–0 victory over Romania moved the Croatians to the quarter-finals against Germany. Croatia beat the Germans 3–0 with goals from Robert Jarni, Goran Vlaović and Davor Šuker, all after Christian Wörns had been sent off. They advanced to their first semi-final against hosts France. After a goalless first-half, Croatia led after Aljoša Asanović pushed past Zinedine Zidane to cross a ball downfield to Šuker who scored after a one-on-one with goalkeeper Fabien Barthez. France's defender Lilian Thuram equalised quickly after, and scored another goal later in the game to beat Croatia 2–1. In the third place match, Croatia prevailed against the Netherlands 2–1 to secure bronze and claim their first World Cup medal. Šuker won the Golden Shoe for scoring the most goals in the World Cup: six goals in seven games. The Croatians' performance during the late-1990s propelled them to rank third place in the FIFA World Ranking in January 1999. The team of the 1990s was dubbed the "golden generation" (Note: A portion of this squad (Jarni, Štimac, Boban, Prosinečki and Šuker) previously won the 1987 FIFA World Youth Championship with the Yugoslavia under-20 team.) for their contributions to Croatia's ascension in international football.

=== Jozić, Barić and Kranjčar period (2000–2006) ===
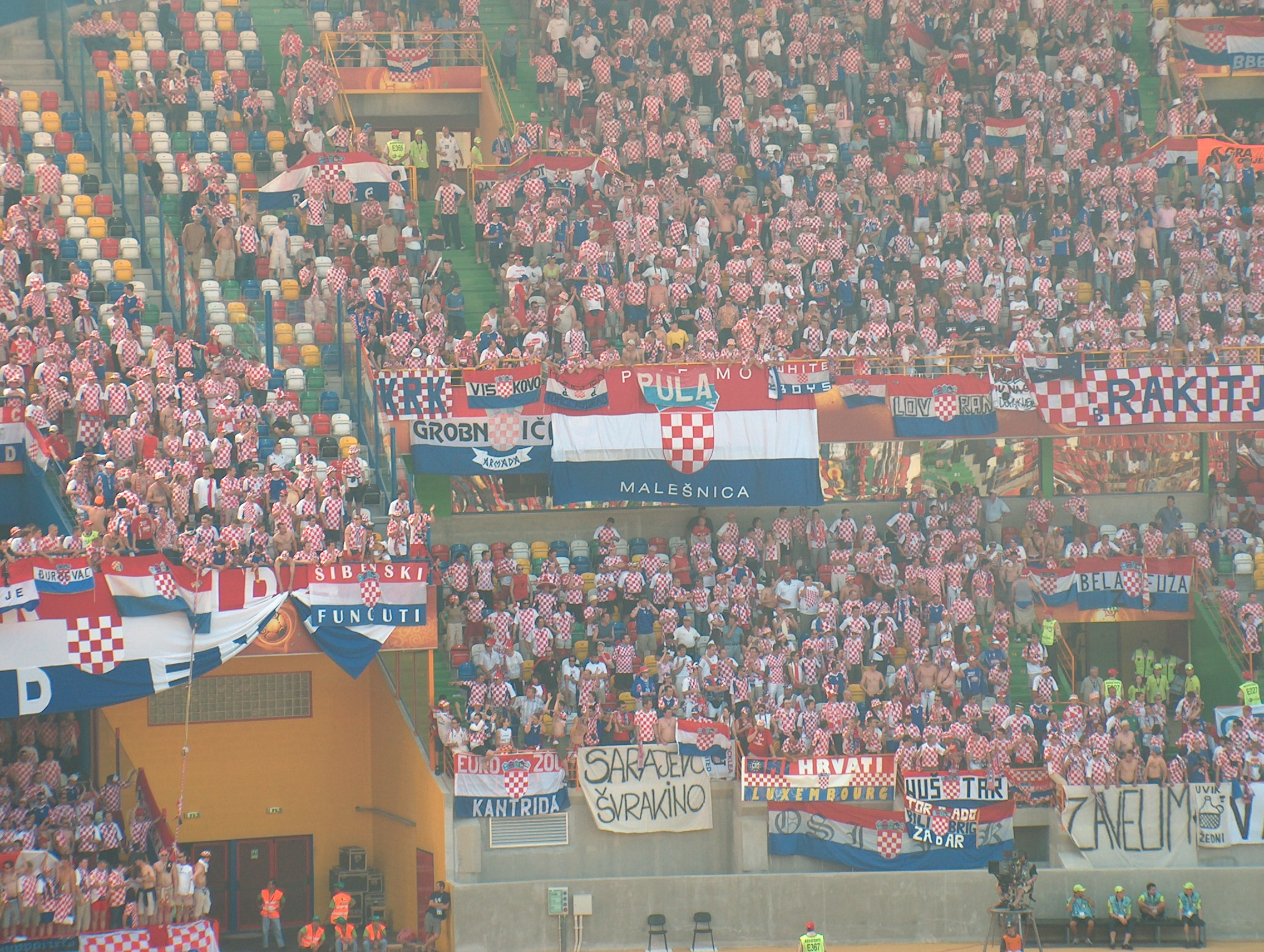
Fans during Euro 2004 in Portugal

Croatia started their qualifying campaign for the 2002 World Cup with draws against Belgium and Scotland prompting Blažević's resignation as head coach in October 2000. His successor, Mirko Jozić, pushed the team through the rest of qualifiers undefeated. In the group stage, Croatia narrowly lost to Mexico before beating Italy 2–1 and sustaining a 1–0 loss to Ecuador. The team was eliminated by one point, leading to the resignation of Jozić and succession of Otto Barić in July 2002, their first manager born outside of Southeast Europe. During Barić's tenure, most of the remaining players from the "golden generation" squad were gradually replaced by younger players over the course of qualifying for Euro 2004.

Croatia qualified in a playoff victory against Slovenia, winning 2–1 on aggregate after Dado Pršo's decisive late goal in the second leg. The team was eliminated at the group stage after drawing 0–0 with Switzerland and 2–2 with France, and losing 2–4 to England. Barić departed after his two-year contract expired in June 2004. Prior to launching the team's qualification for the 2006 World Cup, Zlatko Kranjčar succeed in July 2004. Croatia qualified undefeated, finishing top of the group ahead of Sweden and Bulgaria. In the group stage, Croatia lost their opening match against Brazil and drew 0–0 with Japan after Darijo Srna missed a first-half penalty. A 2–2 draw with Australia in which three players were sent off confirmed Croatia's elimination.

=== First Bilić period (2006–2012) ===
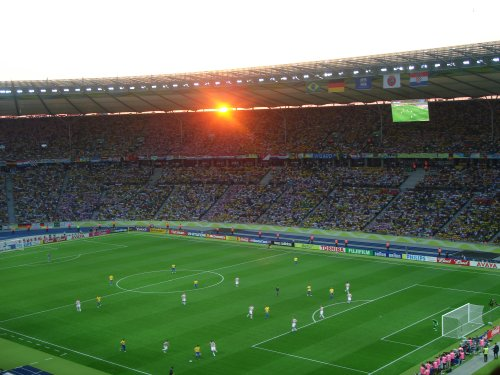
Bilić initially joined Croatia after the 2006 World Cup (pictured) until 2012, later returning 14 years later in 2026

In July 2006, Kranjčar was replaced by Slaven Bilić, who introduced newer, younger players into the squad and concluded qualifying undefeated. His first match resulted in a 2–0 victory against reigning world champions Italy during an international friendly. Croatia lost once to Macedonia and defeated England twice, resulting in their failure to qualify for the first time since 1984. Eduardo da Silva, the team's top goalscorer during qualifying, suffered an injury while playing for his club, Arsenal, leading to a reshuffle in the finals squad with less experienced players. Croatia finished their play in Group B undefeated, with a 1–0 win over co-hosts Austria, a 2–1 victory against Germany, and a 1–0 win over Poland. The team achieved the maximum group stage points possible (nine) for the first time in their Euros history. Niko Kovač and Dario Šimić served as captains during the group and knockout stages, respectively. Croatia pushed Turkey to a penalty shoot-out in the quarter-finals, in which the Turkish side prevailed in an upset where Luka Modrić, Mladen Petrić, and Ivan Rakitić all missed their penalties. Croatia set multiple Euro records: fewest goals conceded (2), fewest games lost (0), (Note: Under the rules of Association football and the official European Championship tournament regulations, a loss inflicted via a penalty shootout does not count as a defeat but rather a tie which needed a final process to determine the team which advances per the Laws of the Game.) and earliest goal scored.

Bilić renewed his contract in April 2008, before the qualifying campaign for the 2010 World Cup. Croatia won 3–0 against Kazakhstan, before enduring a 4–1 loss to England at Stadion Maksimir, their first home loss in 14 years. The team drew 0–0 with Ukraine and beat Andorra twice, drawing again with Ukraine and beating Belarus twice. In the final stretch of the qualifiers, England delivered Croatia's then-heaviest loss, a 5–1 scoreline, at Wembley Stadium. The team had several injuries during qualifying and were ultimately eliminated on points, as Ukraine defeated both England and Andorra to advance in the group.

Croatia was a candidate to co-host Euro 2012 with Hungary which would have resulted in automatic qualification for both countries; UEFA ultimately selected Poland and Ukraine. The Croatians began their qualifying campaign for Euro 2012 with a 3–0 win over Latvia, a goalless draw with Greece, and a 2–1 win against Israel. In the qualifying playoff against Turkey, the team won 3–0 on aggregate. They were grouped with the Republic of Ireland, Italy and defending champions Spain, opening with a 3–1 victory over the Irish. Croatia drew with Italy 1–1 in a match marred by disruptive fans and controversial refereeing from English official Howard Webb. Spain knocked out the side in a 0–1 loss. Bilić retired before Euro 2012, with the Croatians continuously ranked among the top ten teams in the world during his tenure – 2007 to 2012.

=== Štimac, Kovač and Čačić period (2012–2017) ===
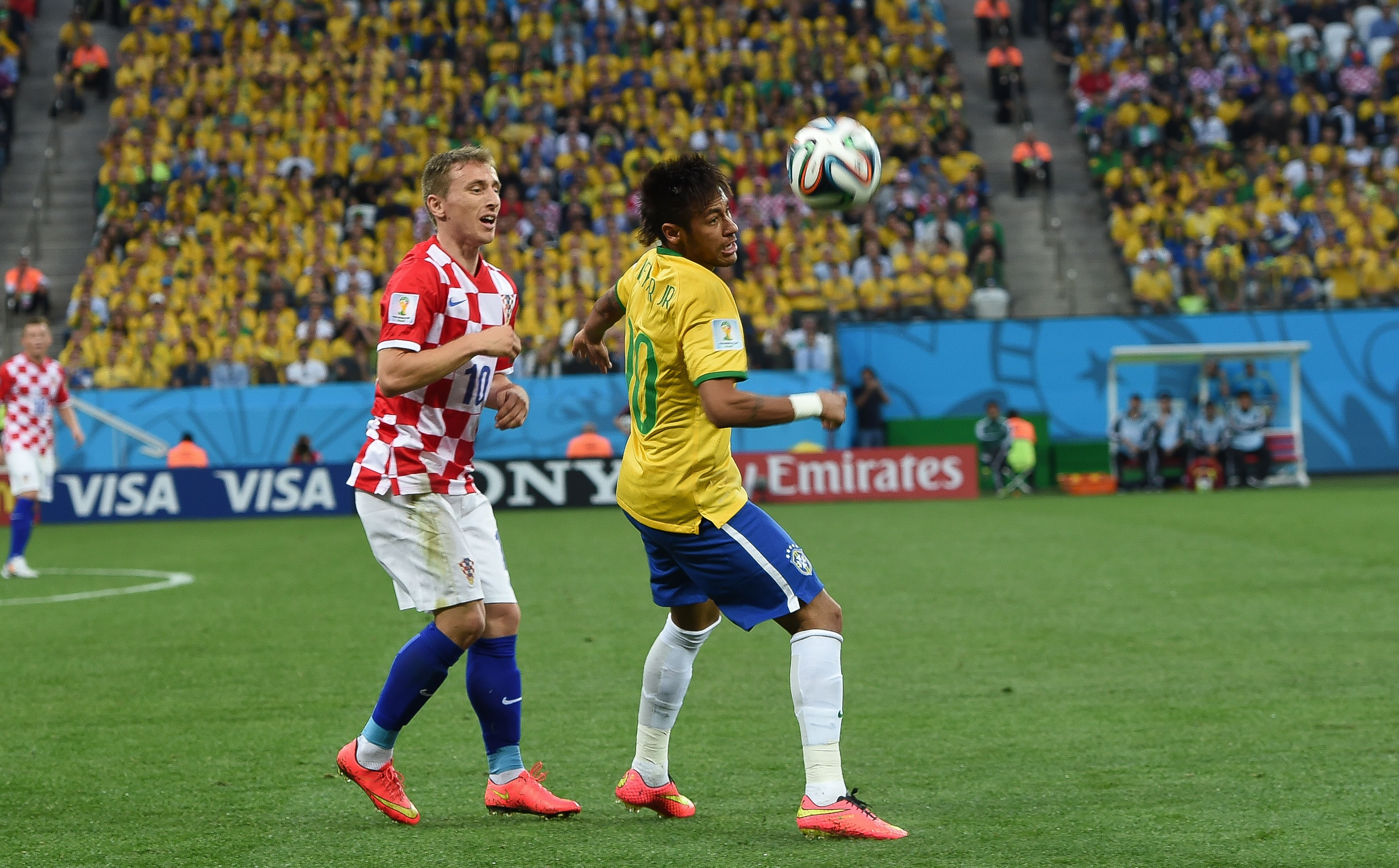
Croatia vs. Brazil at the 2014 World Cup

Succeeding Bilić, former player Igor Štimac was appointed manager. At the same time, Davor Šuker assumed the presidency of the Croatian Football Federation in 2012 after the death of Vlatko Marković. A year in, Štimac was replaced by former captain Niko Kovač. Kovač led the team to a 2–0 aggregate victory over Iceland in the qualifying playoffs for the 2014 World Cup with both goals coming in the home leg in Zagreb. In the group stage, Croatia opened their campaign with a 3–1 loss to hosts Brazil. The match garnered media attention for controversial refereeing from Yuichi Nishimura which was scrutinised for a number of decisions. In their second match, Croatia won 4–0 against Cameroon then lost 3–1 to Mexico, finishing third in the group and missing the knockout stage.

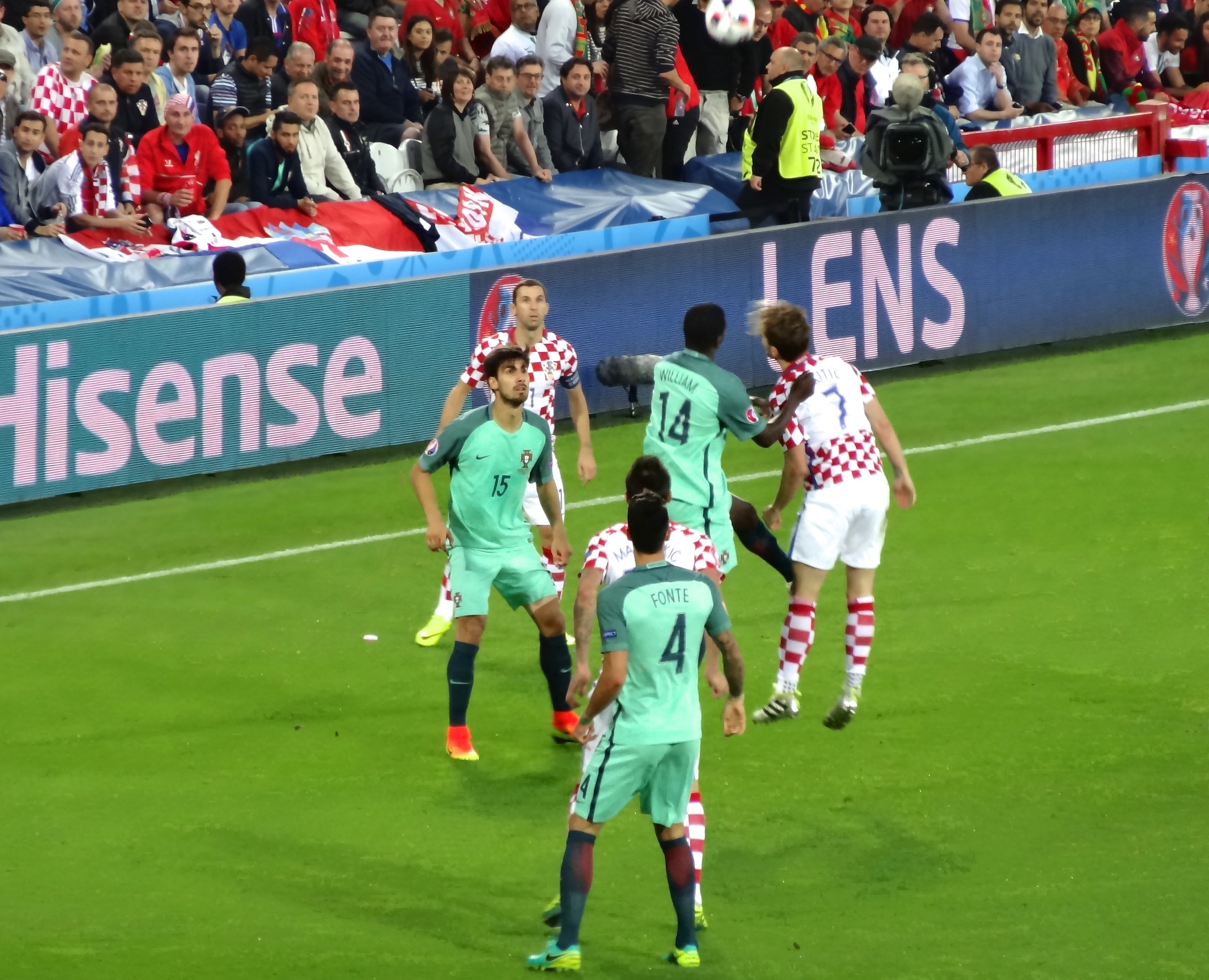
Croatia vs. Portugal at Euro 2016

During the qualifying campaign of Euro 2016, Croatia drew with Azerbaijan and lost to Norway, leading to Kovač's replacement with Ante Čačić. The team broke their record for most goals scored in a match with a friendly 10–0 win over San Marino in June 2016. They topped the group stage of that year's Euros, advancing with defending champions Spain. Croatia prevailed over Turkey 1–0 with a long-range volley goal from Luka Modrić, before drawing 2–2 against the Czech Republic. In the latter match, Croatia led with goals from Ivan Perišić and Ivan Rakitić, while opposing Czech striker Milan Škoda and a last-minute penalty from Tomáš Necid drew the match. There was severe crowd trouble and on-field flares in the game's last minutes with a steward injured by a stray firework. Croatia then defeated Spain 2–1, confirming the Spaniards' first defeat at a Euro finals match since 2004. The Croatians were tipped as one of the tournament favourites as they entered the knockout stage with Portugal. The Portuguese prevailed 1–0 with Ricardo Quaresma's winning goal in the 117th minute after Perišić hit the post with a header in the previous attack. Following the campaign, Darijo Srna announced his retirement and the succession of Modrić as team captain in August 2016.

=== Dalić period (2017–2026) ===

Squad at 2018 World Cup
Coach: Zlatko Dalić

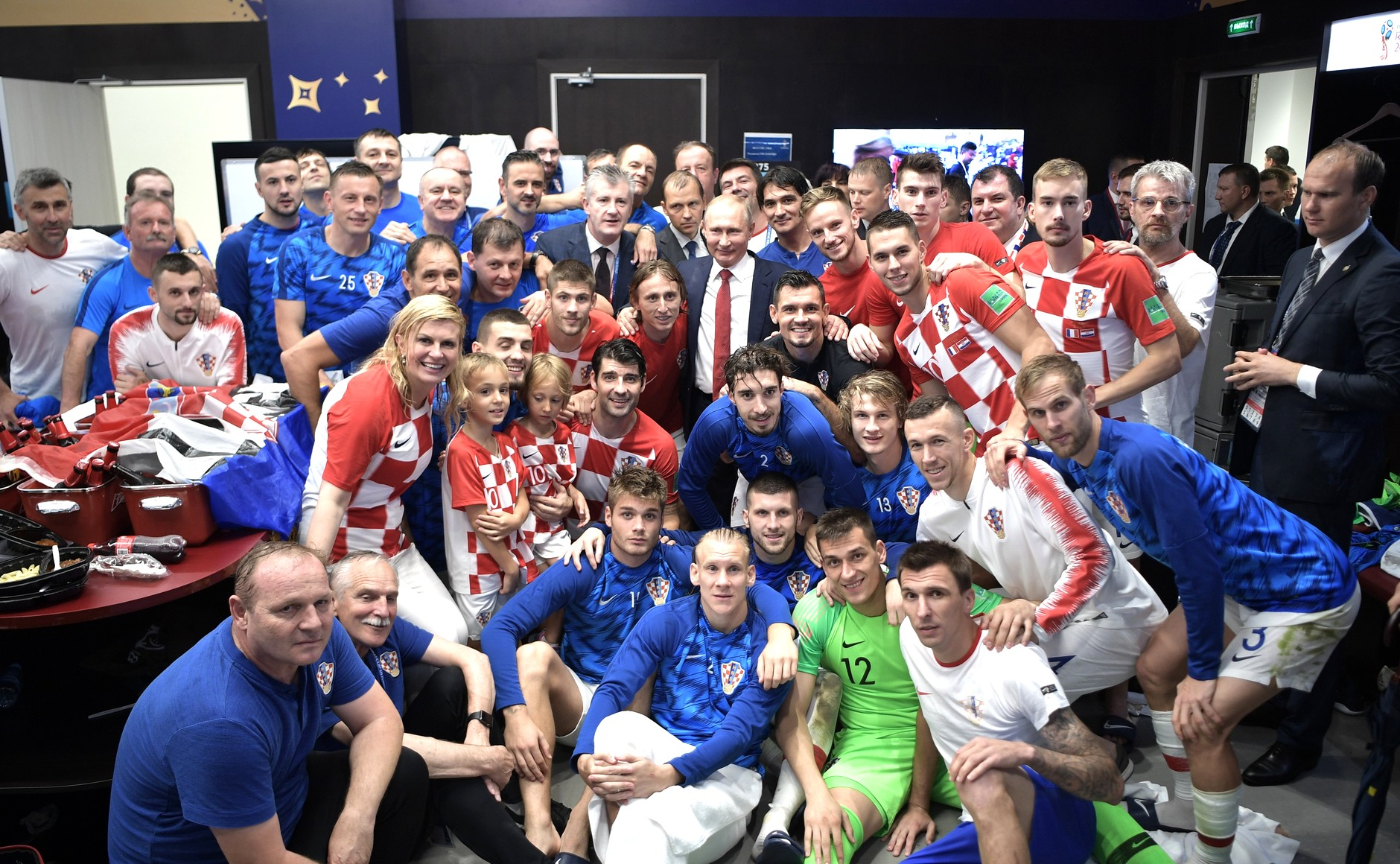
The 2017–18 squad posing with Vladimir Putin and Kolinda Grabar-Kitarović in 2018

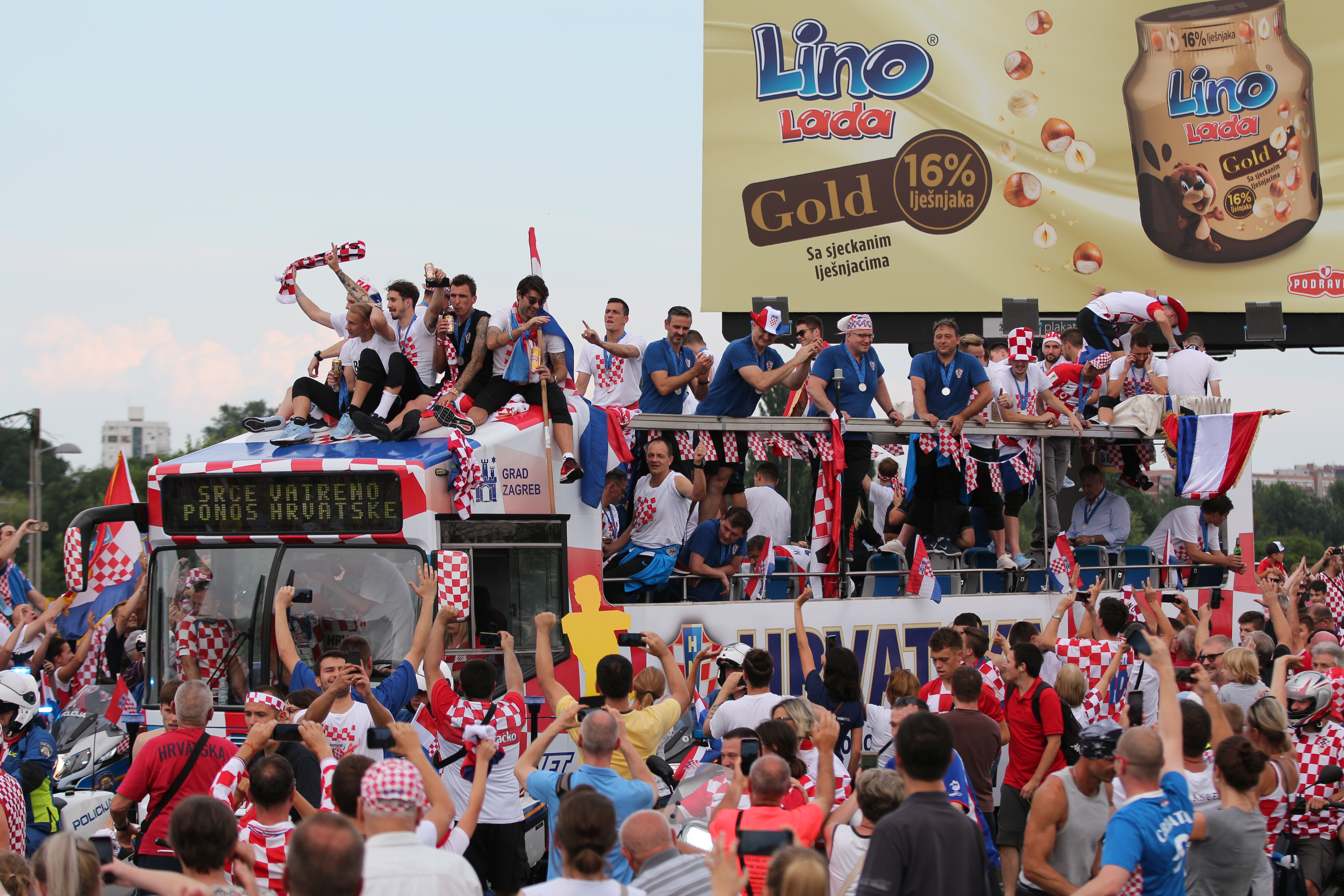
The team arrival in Zagreb after their 2018 World Cup campaign

Croatia qualified for the 2018 World Cup undefeated for their first five matches. Two defeats to Iceland and Turkey, as well as a draw against Finland, led to a public outcry that ousted manager Čačić. He was replaced by Zlatko Dalić, who formally qualified the team with a 2–0 win against Ukraine, and a 4–1 win with Greece, on aggregate, during a playoff round in the first leg in Zagreb. The 2017–18 squad was known as Croatia's second "golden generation", referencing their 1998 counterparts, during the side's World Cup campaign that year. They topped their group with a 2–0 victory over Nigeria, a 3–0 win over Argentina, and a 2–1 win against Iceland – their best-ever group stage performance.

During the knockout stage, they beat Denmark in a penalty shoot-out for the first time after goalkeeper Danijel Subašić saved three penalties, equalling the record for most penalties saved in a shoot-out. In the quarter-finals, Croatia drew 2–2 with hosts Russia, becoming the first team since 1990 to win two consecutive penalty shoot-outs. Playing England in the semi-finals, Croatia equalised to force their third consecutive extra time, matching the tournament record. Mario Mandžukić and Perišić scored as Croatia won 2–1 making them the second-smallest country by population (after Uruguay) and land area (after the Netherlands) to reach a World Cup final. In the final they lost to France 4–2, finishing in second place and securing the silver medal. The match was controversial (Note: A free kick was awarded to France for a possible dive by Antoine Griezmann as well as penalty later in the game awarded by the video assistant referee (VAR) for a handball by Ivan Perišić.) for its refereeing. The team was welcomed by an estimated half a million people (Note: The mass gathering amounted to over 10% of the nation's population. With 550,000 Croatians present, the event constituted the second-largest gathering in modern Croatia.) at their homecoming in Zagreb.

The team entered the Nations League's inaugural 2018–19 edition in League A, along with England and Spain in January 2018. Croatia lost 6–0 away to Spain in their debut. Croatia drew 0–0 home with England, played behind closed doors due to UEFA sanctions. In a rematch with the Spanish, Croatia won 3–2 with a goal in stoppage time, followed by a 2–1 away defeat to England. Croatia were set to be relegated to League B until a tournament rule change retained them in League A, grouping them with Portugal, France and Sweden in the 2020–21 tournament. Croatia lost to France and Portugal, but a victory against Sweden was sufficient to avoid relegation.

Squad at 2022 World Cup
Coach: Zlatko Dalić

The team topped their group for the qualifying campaign of Euro 2020, with a loss to Hungary, and draws against Azerbaijan and Wales. The 2020 finals were delayed to the summer of 2021 due to the COVID-19 pandemic. Overall, winning only two out of eight games in 2020, Croatia achieved their worst-ever aggregate win-rate. Croatia finished second in their Euros group, with a 1–0 loss to England, a 1–1 draw with the Czech Republic and a 3–1 win over Scotland. They advanced to the round of 16, where they lost to Spain 5–3 after extra time. The loss to Spain led to heightened criticism against Dalić and the team by the Croatian public, a faction of whom called for resignations. Dalić refreshed the team roster by introducing younger debutants for the remainder of World Cup qualifying in 2021.

Croatia qualified for the 2022 World Cup with seven wins, two draws and one loss. The team advanced from group stage after a 0–0 draw with Morocco, a 4–1 win against Canada, and finished ahead of Belgium by a single point after drawing 0–0. They won against Japan in a penalty shootout in the round of 16 where Dominik Livaković saved three of four Japanese penalties, equalling a record held by Ricardo and Danijel Subašić. Croatia similarly beat Brazil during the quarter-finals in an upset victory on penalties, having come from behind to draw 1–1 in the final minutes of extra time. In the semi-final match, Croatia sustained their heaviest World Cup defeat, 3–0 against Argentina. They prevailed 2–1 over Morocco in the third place playoff, securing their second bronze medal.

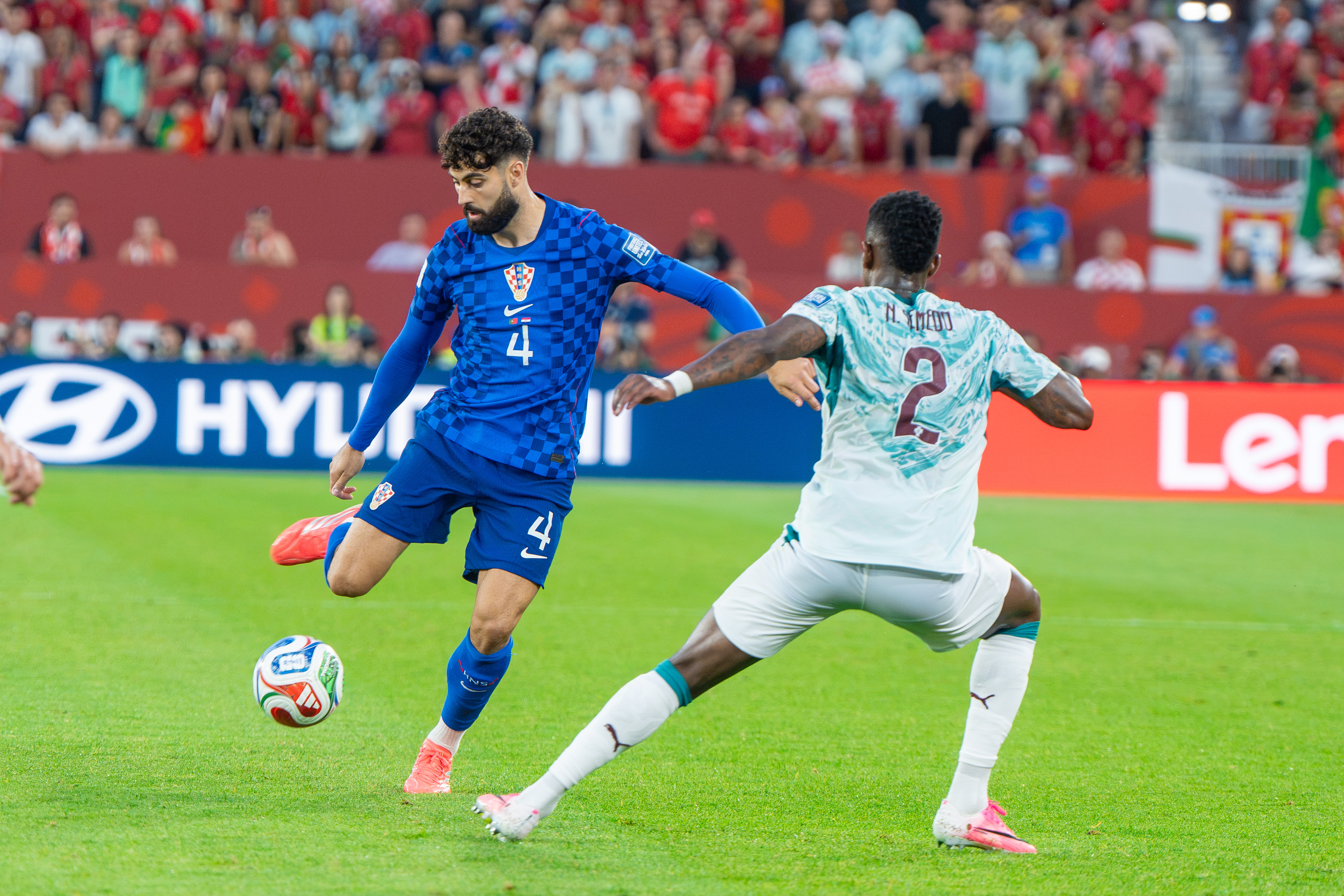
Gvardiol versus Portugal, July 2026

The team topped their group in the 2023 Nations League, knocking out reigning champions France by winning 1–0 on a penalty – their first-ever win against the French. Croatia beat the Netherlands 4–2 in the semi-finals, advancing to their first Nations League final, against Spain. After drawing the Spanish 0–0 in extra time, the team lost the penalty shootout 4–5, finishing the tournament in second place. Croatia finished second in qualifying for Euro 2024, being drawn into a "group of death" with Spain, Italy, and Albania. After a 3–0 loss to Spain, they drew 2–2 with Albania and 1–1 with Italy. The Italians eliminated Croatia from advancing to the knockout stage, on points, with a 98th-minute stoppage-time goal from striker Mattia Zaccagni. They went on to win the 2024 FIFA Series tournament in March, Croatia's first exhibition championship.

Croatia topped their qualifying group undefeated for the 2026 World Cup – with 7 wins and 1 draw – in their best qualification run to date. After finishing second in group stage, they advanced to the knockout stage. They were knocked out by Portugal in a 2–1 defeat where an equalising 103rd-minute stoppage-time goal from Joško Gvardiol was controversially disallowed as offside by snickometer-enabled VAR. Following Dalić’s resignation at the conclusion of his contract later that year, he was succeeded by Bilić in his second term as manager.

=== Second Bilić period (2026–) ===
The return of Slaven Bilić coincided with the 2026–27 UEFA Nations League where Croatia won their debut game against Czechia, 2–1. Croatia sustained their largest-ever defeat on record, in a 7–0 match against England that Bilić labeled a "collective blackout" for the side.

== Team image ==
=== Kits ===
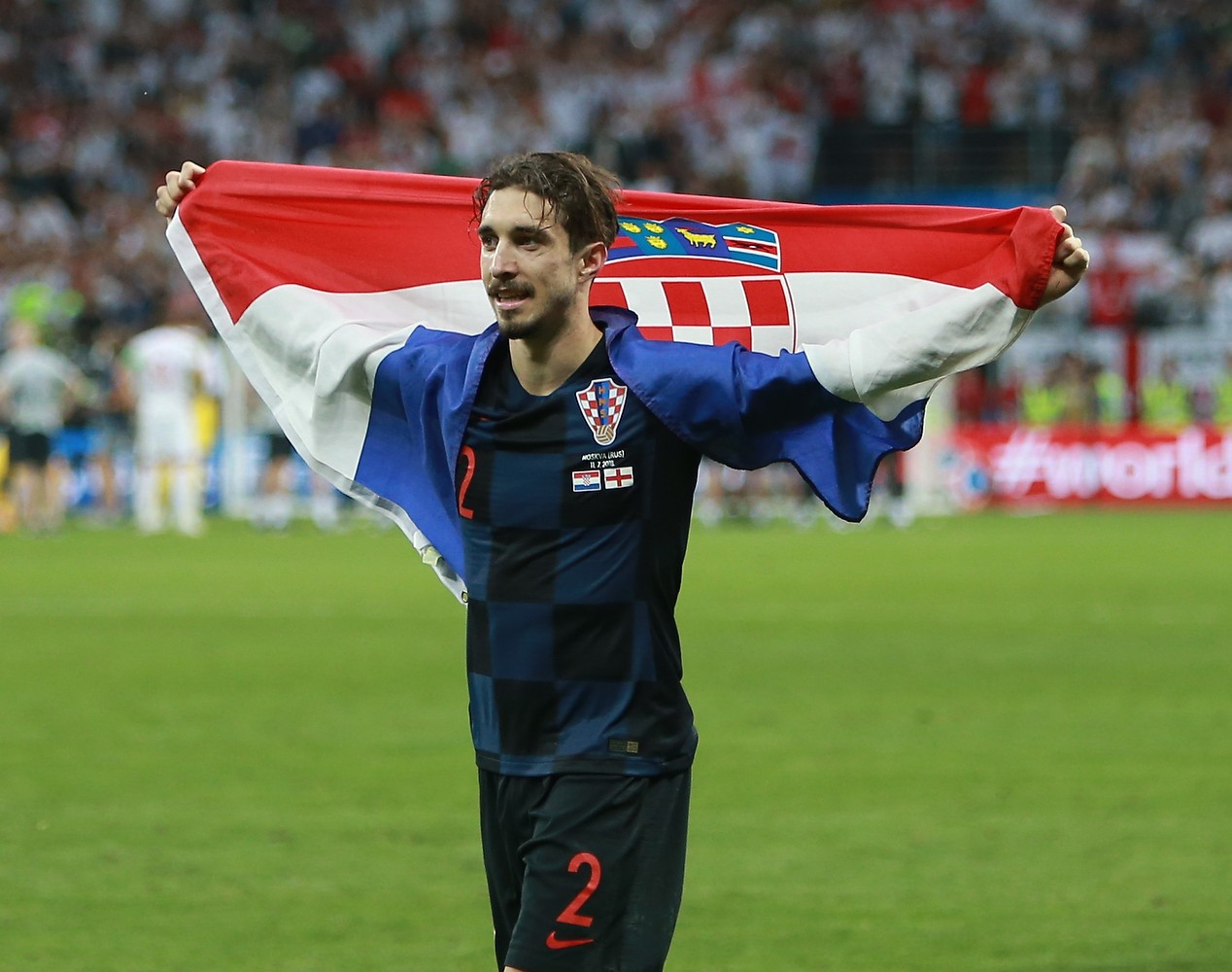
The team's image references the national colours of Croatia. Pictured: Šime Vrsaljko, 2018

Croatia's modern-day team jersey was created in 1990 by Miroslav Šutej, who similarly designed the coat of arms of Croatia, which features in the Croatian national flag. The red-and-white motif is based on the Croatian checkerboard (šahovnica). The typical kit colour-way features red-and-white checkered shirts, white shorts and blue socks to match the Croatian tricolor (Trobojnica). There have been variants made by the kit manufacturers since the original release; the jersey design has remained consistent throughout the years and has served as a blueprint for other Croatian national sports teams and entities.

The away kits used by the team have for a period been all-blue, incorporating the red-and-white checkers as a trim. Croatia has used darker coloured away kits such as the dark navy-and-black checkered design that featured prominently in the 2018 World Cup. The Vatreni have often been required to use their darker away kits even when playing at home because their opponents have red-and-white colour schemes that clash with the chequers of Croatia.

Kit supplier	Period
(Germany) Uhlsport	1990–1991
(Italy) Lotto	1992–1994
(Italy) Kappa	1994
(England) Umbro	1994
(Italy) Lotto	1994–2000
(United States) Nike	2000–2026
(Germany) Adidas	2026–present

=== Supporters ===
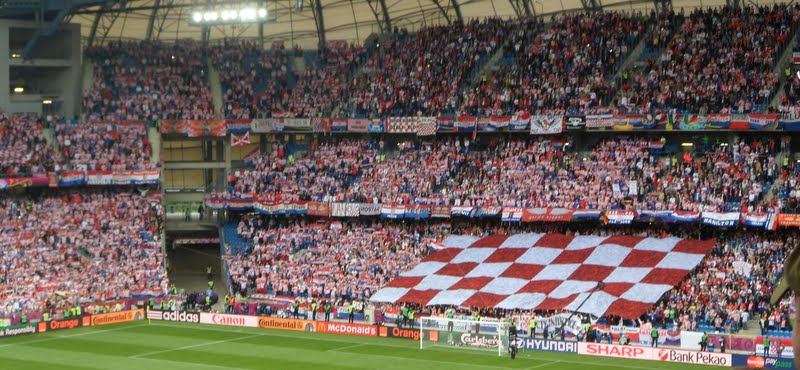
Croatia supporters at Euro 2012, featuring the national checkerboard

The team has developed an extensive fan base since the 1990s. Following their debut run at the 1998 World Cup, there was a rise in domestic and global attention for the side. Political scientist Alex J. Bellamy observed in 2003 that the national team became a symbol of statehood in Croatia after their independence through the cultural export of football. The government's influence on team affairs eased substantially after the death of President Franjo Tuđman in 1999. All matches are followed and televised throughout the country, particularly during major tournaments. In November 2022, the Ministry of Science and Education issued guidance to let school children watch matches during the school day as long coursework is made up later. Following the 2018 World Cup, the Croatian Cabinet attended ministerial meetings in team jerseys, and during the 2022 World Cup, Prime Minister Andrej Plenković delivered a hurried speech "[lasting] only 37 seconds" at the Euro-Mediterranean Summit to catch the quarter-finals.

The Croatian Football Federation endorses an official fan club for the team, known as Uvijek Vjerni ("Always Faithful"). A part of the team's support consists of fans of Dinamo Zagreb and Hajduk Split, the two largest clubs in Croatia's top domestic football league, the Hrvatska nogometna liga (HNL). Both sets of fans—Bad Blue Boys from Zagreb and Torcida from Split—have been associated with hooliganism due to their ultra-style support. Regional support for the team also comes from Croats of Bosnia and Herzegovina, particularly from fans of domestic clubs Zrinjski Mostar and Široki Brijeg. The diaspora of Croatians across the United States, Canada, Australia, and South America contribute to the majority of the side's international support. It is customary among supporters to include an inscription of their city of origin onto the Croatian flag. Fans also coordinate their vocal support and orchestrate chants during matches. One section may shout "U boj, u boj" ("To battle, to battle") with another responding "Za narod svoj" ("For our people"). In addition to chants, the team regularly have songs dedicated to them, such as Slaven Bilić's "Vatreno ludilo" (Fiery Madness) which topped Croatian music charts during Euro 2008.

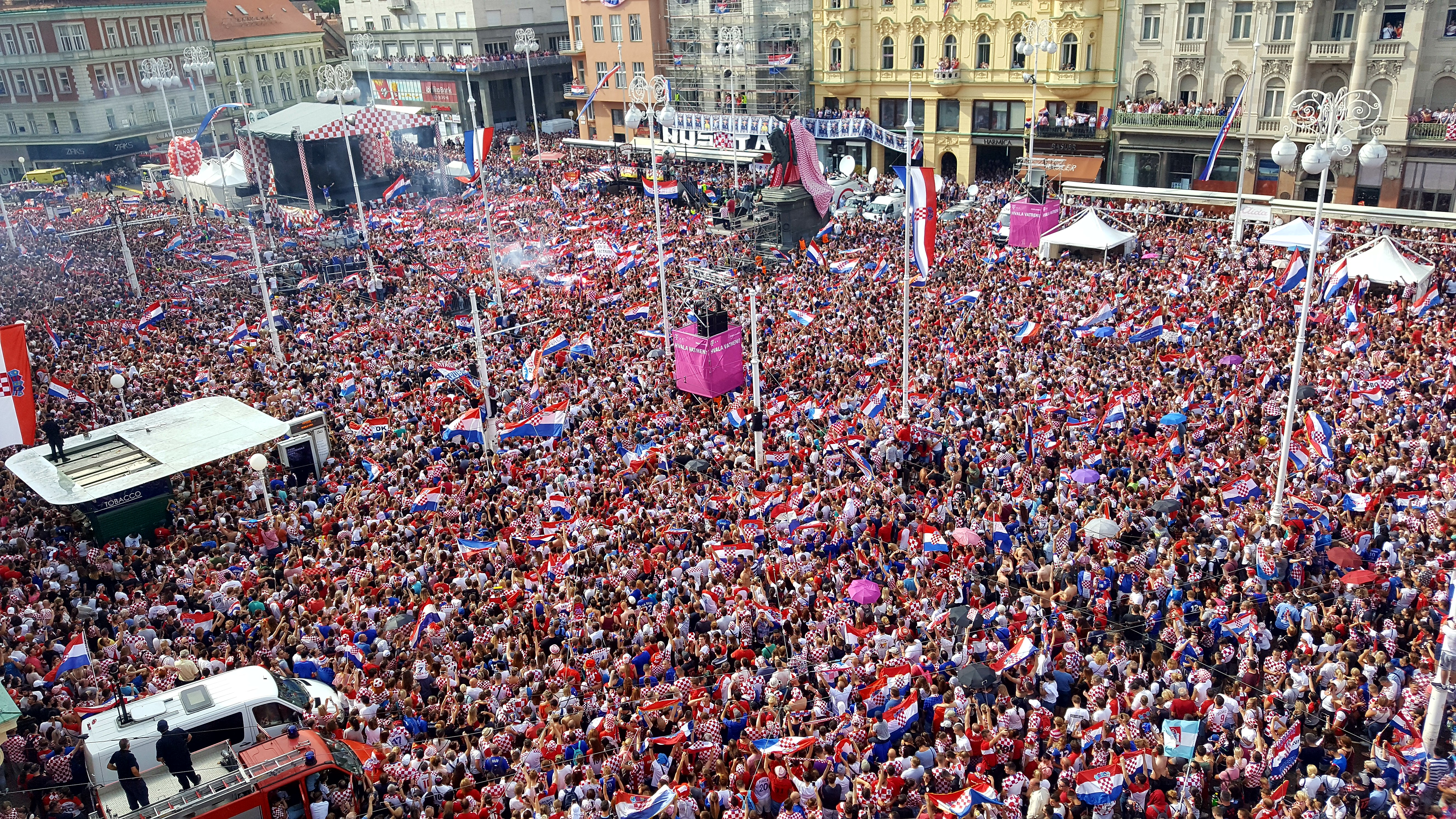
Smoke from supporters' pyrotechnics in Ban Jelačić Square, 2018

The disruptive behaviour of supporters during matches, particularly those exhibiting ultra-style fandom, has complicated national team affairs. Hooliganism, rioting, vandalism, littering, violence, use of pyrotechnics and discriminatory political expression have led to sanctions both domestically and internationally. The football federation, government, and players have made material efforts to prevent unwanted incidents to avoid damage to the perception of the team and Croatian people. This has included banning their own fans from certain games. The behaviour of fans has led to penalties and fines for the national team imposed by FIFA and UEFA. The Croatian Football Federation has been assessed significant disciplinary fines and penalties since the early 2000s. In addition to monetary fines, the team has faced tournament point deductions and have had their supporters banned. There have also been multiple acts of protest against the national team, in response to allegations of corruption.

=== Charity ===
To advance the team's charitable efforts, manager Slaven Bilić established the Vatreno Srce (Fiery Heart) Foundation in 2010. The primary cause of the foundation is helping children. As of 2012, the foundation made fifty donations of 1,200,000 HRK to various children's organisations. In December 2012, the foundation made 500,000 HRK on an auction of Niko Kranjčar's shirt and Lionel Messi's shirt that was signed by all FC Barcelona players. The auction was organised in the Esplanade Zagreb Hotel and attended by President of Croatia Ivo Josipović. In November 2018, the players gathered in The Westin Hotel in Zagreb to answer fans' phonecalls, the proceeds of which were donated to the Vatreno Srce Foundation. In 2018, the foundation financed Children's Hospital Zagreb and Korak u Život (A Step Into Life), a charity that helps young children raised in orphanages transition into higher education. In November 2019, more than 500,000 HRK was collected in another call event that were then directed to Children's Hospital Kantrida. In March 2020, the players collectively donated 4.2 million HRK to combat the COVID-19 pandemic and for repair of damage caused by the 2020 Zagreb earthquake. Members of national team visit and help children with special needs and their education institutions.

== Stadiums ==
The national team has played in thirteen stadiums around the country. The majority of Croatia's home matches take place at Stadion Maksimir in Zagreb, the country's largest football stadium, which is also the home-ground of local football club Dinamo Zagreb. The Croatian Football Federation previously agreed on extensive plans with the government to renovate the stadium and increase its forty-thousand seating capacity, the proposal was eventually rejected by Mayor of Zagreb Milan Bandić in 2008 due to construction costs. Home matches are occasionally played at other, smaller venues around the country. Stadion Poljud in Split has hosted some qualifying fixtures since 1995. Between 1995 and 2011, Croatia never won a competitive match at Poljud, which the local media dubbed Poljudsko prokletsvo ("the Poljud curse"). Qualifying fixtures have also been played at Stadion Kantrida in Rijeka along with Stadion Gradski Vrt in Osijek and Stadion Varteks in Varaždin.

Stadium	City / town	Pld	W	D	L	Win %	Last match hosted	Map of the host cities
Stadion Maksimir	Zagreb	70	49	15	6	70.0	2025	Croatia national football team is located in Croatia
Stadion Poljud	(Split-Dalmatia County) Split	21	5	10	6	23.8	2026	Croatia national football team is located in Croatia
Stadion Gradski vrt	(Osijek-Baranja County) Osijek	14	10	3	1	71.4	2022	Croatia national football team is located in Croatia
Stadion Kantrida	(Primorje-Gorski Kotar County) Rijeka	11	10	1	0	90.9	2011	Croatia national football team is located in Croatia
Stadion Rujevica	(Primorje-Gorski Kotar County) Rijeka	12	8	2	2	66.7	2026	Croatia national football team is located in Croatia
Stadion Varteks	(Varaždin County) Varaždin	10	7	2	1	70.0	2026	Croatia national football team is located in Croatia
Stadion A. Drosina	(Istria County) Pula	5	4	0	1	80.0	2019	Croatia national football team is located in Croatia
Opus Arena	(Osijek-Baranja County) Osijek	4	3	0	1	75.0	2026	Croatia national football team is located in Croatia
Stadion Koprivnica	(Koprivnica-Križevci County) Koprivnica	1	1	0	0	100.0	2016	Croatia national football team is located in Croatia
Stadion Cibalia	(Vukovar-Syrmia County) Vinkovci	1	1	0	0	100.0	2009	Croatia national football team is located in Croatia
Stadion Kranjčevićeva	Zagreb	1	1	0	0	100.0	1996	Croatia national football team is located in Croatia
Stadion Šubićevac	(Šibenik-Knin County) Šibenik	1	0	1	0	0.0	2003	Croatia national football team is located in Croatia
Stadion Radnik	(Zagreb County) Velika Gorica	1	0	1	0	0.0	2021	Croatia national football team is located in Croatia
Total		148	96	34	18	64.9%	2026	

Last updated: Croatia vs. Czech Republic, 15 November 2026
Statistics include only official matches recognised by Croatian Football Federation (HNS)

== Results and fixtures ==
The following is a list of match results in the last 12 months, as well as any future matches that have been scheduled.

Win Draw Loss Fixture

=== 2026 ===
26 March Friendly	Colombia	1–2	Croatia	Orlando, Florida, United States
19:30 EDT	J. Arias 2'	Report	Vušković 6'; Matanović 42'	Stadium: Camping World Stadium; Attendance: 50,000; Referee: Rubiel Vazquez (United States)

31 March Friendly	Brazil	3–1	Croatia	Orlando, United States
20:00 EDT	Danilo 45+2'; Thiago 88' (pen.); Martinelli 90+2'	Report	Majer 84'	Stadium: Camping World Stadium; Attendance: 46,398; Referee: Armando Villarreal (United States)

2 June Friendly	Croatia	0–2	Belgium	Rijeka, Croatia
18:00 CEST		Report	Tielemans 38'; Lukaku 90+6'	Stadium: Stadion Rujevica; Attendance: 7,555; Referee: Rade Obrenović (Slovenia)

7 June Friendly	Croatia	2–1	Slovenia	Varaždin, Croatia
20:45 CEST	Modrić 51'; Mari. Pašalić 90+3'	Report	Šporar 83'	Stadium: Stadion Varteks; Attendance: 8,800; Referee: Bence Csonka (Hungary)

17 June 2026 World Cup GS (Group L)	England	4–2	Croatia	Arlington, United States
15:00 EST	Kane 12' (pen.), 42'; Bellingham 47'; Rashford 85'	Report	Baturina 36'; Musa 45+5'	Stadium: AT&T Stadium; Attendance: 70,389; Referee: Clément Turpin (France)

23 June 2026 World Cup GS (Group L)	Panama	0–1	Croatia	Toronto, Canada
19:00 EDT		Report	Budimir 54'	Stadium: BMO Field; Attendance: 43,036; Referee: Pierre Atcho (Gabon)

27 June 2026 World Cup GS (Group L)	Croatia	2–1	Ghana	Philadelphia, United States
17:00 EDT	P. Sučić 31'; Vlašić 83'	Report	Luckassen 73'	Stadium: Lincoln Financial Field; Attendance: 68,324; Referee: Drew Fischer (Canada)

2 July 2026 World Cup R32	Portugal	2–1	Croatia	Toronto, Canada
19:00 EDT	Ronaldo 68' (pen.); Ramos 90+4'	Report	Perišić 53'	Stadium: BMO Field; Attendance: 43,036; Referee: Espen Eskås (Norway)

26 September 2026–27 UEFA Nations League	Czech Republic	1–2	Croatia	Prague, Czech Republic
20:45 UTC+2	Karabec 54'	Report	Modrić 47'; Pašalić 77'	Stadium: Fortuna Arena; Attendance: 15,421; Referee: Simone Sozza (Italy)

29 September 2026–27 UEFA Nations League	Spain	4–1	Croatia	Seville, Spain
20:45 UTC+2	Yamal 2', 63'; Pubill 31'; Williams 89'	Report	Beljo 28'	Stadium: Ramón Sánchez-Pizjuán; Attendance: 40,294; Referee: Serdar Gözübüyük (Netherlands)

3 October 2026–27 UEFA Nations League	Croatia	0–7	England	Rijeka, Croatia
20:45 UTC+2		Report	Kane 8', 53'; Bellingham 21'; Gordon 39'; Saka 45', 68'; Rogers 87'	Stadium: Stadion Rujevica; Attendance: 6,342; Referee: Sven Jablonski (Germany)

6 October 2026–27 UEFA Nations League	Croatia	1–2	Spain	Split, Croatia
20:45 UTC+2	Perišić 17'	Report	Merino 61', 88'	Stadium: Stadion Poljud; Attendance: 32,690; Referee: Erik Lambrechts (Belgium)

12 November 2026–27 UEFA Nations League	England	2–1	Croatia	London, England
19:45 UTC+0	Rogers 24'; Kane 64' (pen.)	Report	P. Sučić 59'	Stadium: Wembley Stadium; Attendance: 80,484; Referee: Morten Krogh (Denmark)

15 November 2026–27 UEFA Nations League	Croatia	2–1	Czech Republic	Osijek, Croatia
20:45 UTC+1	Perišić 2'; Majer 87'	Report	Hložek 84'	Stadium: Opus Arena; Attendance: 12,009; Referee: Luís Godinho (Portugal)

== Management ==
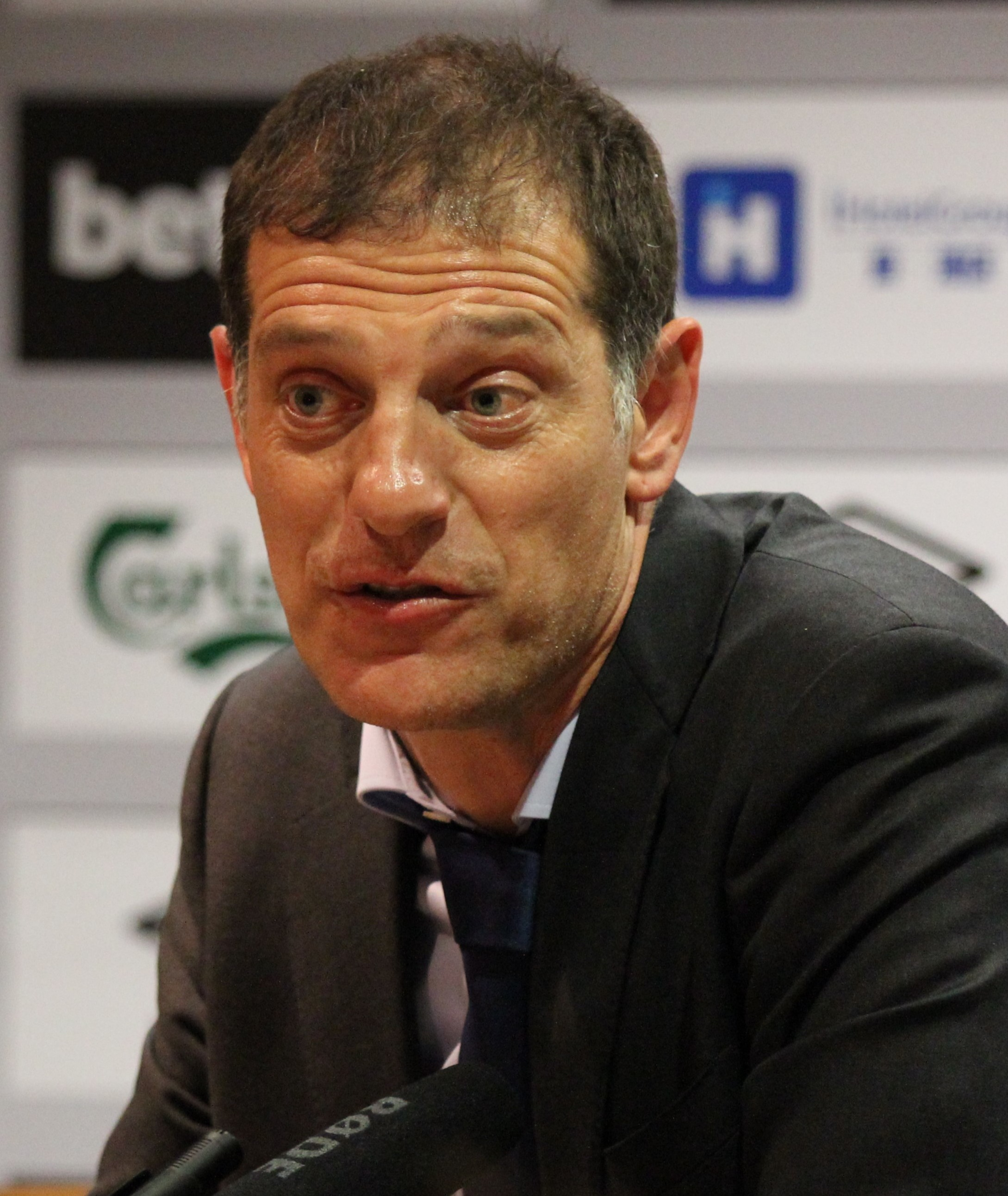
Current head coach Slaven Bilić

Position	Name
Head coach	(Croatia) Slaven Bilić
Assistant coach	(Croatia) Nikola Jurčević (Croatia) Danilo Butorović (Croatia) Dean Računica
Goalkeeping coaches	(Croatia) Vatroslav Mihačić
Fitness coaches	(Croatia) Fedor Kulušić (Wales) Nick Davies
Set piece coach	(Italy) Giovanni Vio
Video analyst	(Croatia) Alen Terzić (Croatia) Jasmin Osmanović (Croatia) Ive Bilić
Physiotherapists	(Croatia) Goran Beloglavec (Croatia) Neven Golubar (Croatia) Jure Skelin (Croatia) Nderim Redžaj
Doctors	(Croatia) Jurica Rakić (Croatia) Eduard Rod (Croatia) Tomislav Vlahović
Technical director	(Croatia) Stipe Pletikosa
Coordinator	(Croatia) Aljoša Asanović
Team manager	(Croatia) Iva Olivari
Media officer	(Croatia) Tomislav Pacak
Ticketing manager	(Croatia) Nikša Martinac
Security manager	(Croatia) Miroslav Marković
Marketing director	(Croatia) Ante Cicvarić
Event and Match manager	(Croatia) Helena Puškar
Chef	(Croatia) Tomica Đukić
Kit men	(Croatia) Dennis Lukančić (Croatia) Mladen Pilčić (Croatia) Goran Vincek

=== Manager history ===
The following table summarises the complete record of each Croatia manager in the FIFA World Cup, the UEFA European Championship, the UEFA Nations League and official friendly matches.

Manager	Period	Pld	W	D	L	Win %
Pre-independence
(Kingdom of Yugoslavia) Jozo Jakopić	1940–1941	4	2	1	1	50.00
(Independent State of Croatia) Rudolf Hitrec	1941	1	0	0	1	0.00
(Independent State of Croatia) Bogdan Cuvaj	1941–1943	13	6	3	4	46.15
(Independent State of Croatia) Bernard Hügl	1943–1945	1	1	0	0	100.00
(Socialist Federal Republic of Yugoslavia) Bogdan Cuvaj	1956	1	1	0	0	100.00
Total		20	10	4	6	50%

Manager	Period	Pld	W	D	L	Win %	Major competitions
Post-independence
(Croatia) Dražan Jerković	1990–1991	3	3	0	0	100.00	
(Croatia) Stanko Poklepović	1992	4	1	1	2	25.00	
(Croatia) Vlatko Marković	1993–1994	1	1	0	0	100.00	
(Croatia) Miroslav Blažević	1994–2000	72	33	24	15	45.83	1996 European Championship – Quarter-finals; 1998 World Cup – Third place 2000 European Championship – Failed to qualify
(Croatia) Tomislav Ivić (c) (Note: In September 1994, national team manager Miroslav Blažević, who was also coaching Croatia Zagreb at the time, was dismissed in a 1994–95 UEFA Cup Winners' Cup match against Auxerre. UEFA suspended Blažević for one game, and Ivić was appointed as his replacement for the qualifying match against Italy in November 1994 for UEFA Euro 1996.)	1994	1	1	0	0	100.00	
(Croatia) Mirko Jozić	2000–2002	18	9	6	3	50.00	2002 World Cup – Group stage
(Croatia) Otto Barić	2002–2004	24	11	8	5	45.83	2004 European Championship – Group stage
(Croatia) Zlatko Kranjčar	2004–2006	25	11	8	6	44.00	2006 World Cup – Group stage
(Croatia) Slaven Bilić	2006–2012	65	42	15	8	64.62	2008 European Championship – Quarter-finals; 2010 World Cup – Failed to qualify 2012 European Championship – Group stage
(Croatia) Igor Štimac	2012–2013	15	8	2	5	53.33	
(Croatia) Niko Kovač	2013–2015	19	10	5	4	52.63	2014 World Cup – Group stage
(Croatia) Ante Čačić	2015–2017	25	15	6	4	60.00	2016 European Championship – Round of 16
(Croatia) Zlatko Dalić	2017–2026	111	62	20	29	55.86	2018 World Cup – Runners-up; 2018–19 UEFA Nations League – Group stage 2020 European Championship – Round of 16; 2020–21 UEFA Nations League – Group stage 2022 World Cup – Third place 2022–23 UEFA Nations League – Runners-up; 2024 European Championship – Group stage 2024–25 UEFA Nations League – Quarter-finals; 2026 World Cup – Round of 32
(Croatia) Slaven Bilić	2026–	6	2	0	4	33.33	

Last updated: Croatia vs. Czech Republic, 15 November 2026 Source: Croatian Football Federation

== Players ==
=== Current squad ===
The following players were called up for the 2026–27 UEFA Nations League A matches in November 2026.
Caps and goals correct as of 15 November 2026, after the match against Czech Republic.

No.	Pos.	Player	Date of birth (age)	Caps	Goals	Club
1	GK	Dominik Livaković	9 January 1995 (age 31)	85	0	(Royal Spanish Football Federation) Barcelona
12	GK	Ivor Pandur	25 March 2000 (age 26)	0	0	(Scottish Football Association) Rangers
23	GK	Dominik Kotarski	10 February 2000 (age 26)	4	0	(Croatian Football Federation) Dinamo Zagreb
2	DF	Josip Stanišić	2 April 2000 (age 26)	40	0	(German Football Association) Bayern Munich
3	DF	Luka Vušković	24 February 2007 (age 19)	12	1	(The Football Association) Brighton & Hove Albion
4	DF	Joško Gvardiol	23 January 2002 (age 24)	58	4	(The Football Association) Manchester City
5	DF	Duje Ćaleta-Car	17 September 1996 (age 30)	39	1	(Italian Football Federation) Sassuolo
6	DF	Niko Galešić	26 March 2001 (age 25)	0	0	(Croatian Football Federation) Dinamo Zagreb
13	DF	Ivan Smolčić	17 August 2000 (age 26)	4	0	(Italian Football Federation) Como
18	DF	Šimun Hrgović	20 March 2004 (age 22)	0	0	(Croatian Football Federation) Hajduk Split
7	MF	Lovro Majer	17 January 1998 (age 28)	40	10	(Hellenic Football Federation) AEK Athens
8	MF	Mateo Kovačić	6 May 1994 (age 32)	123	5	(The Football Association) Manchester City
10	MF	Luka Modrić (captain)	9 September 1985 (age 41)	208	30	(Italian Football Federation) AC Milan
15	MF	Mario Pašalić	9 February 1995 (age 31)	94	12	(Italian Football Federation) Atalanta
16	MF	Martin Baturina	16 February 2003 (age 23)	27	2	(Italian Football Federation) Como
17	MF	Petar Sučić	25 October 2003 (age 23)	27	3	(Italian Football Federation) Inter Milan
22	MF	Josip Mišić	28 June 1994 (age 32)	5	0	(Croatian Football Federation) Dinamo Zagreb
9	FW	Dion Drena Beljo	1 March 2002 (age 24)	5	1	(Croatian Football Federation) Dinamo Zagreb
11	FW	Ante Budimir	22 July 1991 (age 35)	44	7	(Royal Spanish Football Federation) Osasuna
14	FW	Ivan Perišić (vice-captain)	2 February 1989 (age 37)	163	41	(Royal Dutch Football Association) PSV Eindhoven
19	FW	Marco Pašalić	14 September 2000 (age 26)	22	2	(United States Soccer Federation) Orlando City
20	FW	Igor Matanović	31 March 2003 (age 23)	17	2	(German Football Association) SC Freiburg
21	FW	Marin Šotiček	18 September 2004 (age 22)	0	0	(Croatian Football Federation) Hajduk Split

=== Recent call-ups ===
The following players have also been called up to the squad in the last twelve months.

Pos.	Player	Date of birth (age)	Caps	Goals	Club	Latest call-up
GK	Karlo Letica	11 February 1997 (age 29)	0	0	(Switzerland) Luzern	v. England, 12 November 2026 ^{PRE}
DF	Josip Šutalo	28 February 2000 (age 26)	40	0	(Italy) Lazio	v. England, 12 November 2026 ^{INJ}
DF	Marin Pongračić	11 September 1997 (age 29)	24	0	(Italy) Fiorentina	v. England, 12 November 2026 ^{INJ}
DF	Josip Juranović	16 August 1995 (age 31)	40	0	(Germany) Union Berlin	v. Czech Republic, 26 September 2026 ^{INJ}
DF	Martin Erlić	24 January 1998 (age 28)	13	1	(Denmark) Midtjylland	v. Czech Republic, 26 September 2026 ^{INJ}
MF	Nikola Vlašić	4 October 1997 (age 29)	70	11	(Italy) Torino	v. Czech Republic, 15 November 2026 ^{INJ}
MF	Luka Sučić	8 September 2002 (age 24)	23	1	(Spain) Real Sociedad	v. England, 12 November 2026 ^{INJ}
MF	Kristijan Jakić	14 May 1997 (age 29)	19	2	(Greece) PAOK	v. England, 12 November 2026 ^{INJ}
MF	Toni Fruk	9 April 2001 (age 25)	7	1	(Croatia) Rijeka	v. England, 12 November 2026 ^{PRE}
MF	Nikola Moro	12 March 1998 (age 28)	10	0	(Italy) Bologna	v. Czech Republic, 26 September 2026 ^{PRE}
MF	Luka Stojković	28 October 2003 (age 23)	0	0	(Croatia) Dinamo Zagreb	v. Czech Republic, 26 September 2026 ^{PRE}
MF	Adrian Segečić	1 June 2004 (age 22)	0	0	(England) Portsmouth	2026 FIFA World Cup ^{PRE}
FW	Franjo Ivanović	1 October 2003 (age 23)	12	2	(France) Lens	v. England, 12 November 2026 ^{INJ}
FW	Andrej Kramarić	19 June 1991 (age 35)	119	36	(Germany) TSG Hoffenheim	v. England, 12 November 2026 ^{PRE}
FW	Petar Musa	4 March 1998 (age 28)	14	2	(United States) FC Dallas	v. England, 12 November 2026 ^{PRE}
^{INJ} = Injured or ill.; ^{WD} = Withdrew.; ^{SUS} = Suspended from participating.; ^{RET} = Retired after latest call-up.; ^{U21} = Joined the Croatia U21 team instead.; ^{PRE} = Preliminary squad./ on call

== Individual statistics ==
As of 15 November 2026

Statistics below are sourced from the Croatian Football Federation, players in bold are still active with Croatia.

=== Most appearances ===
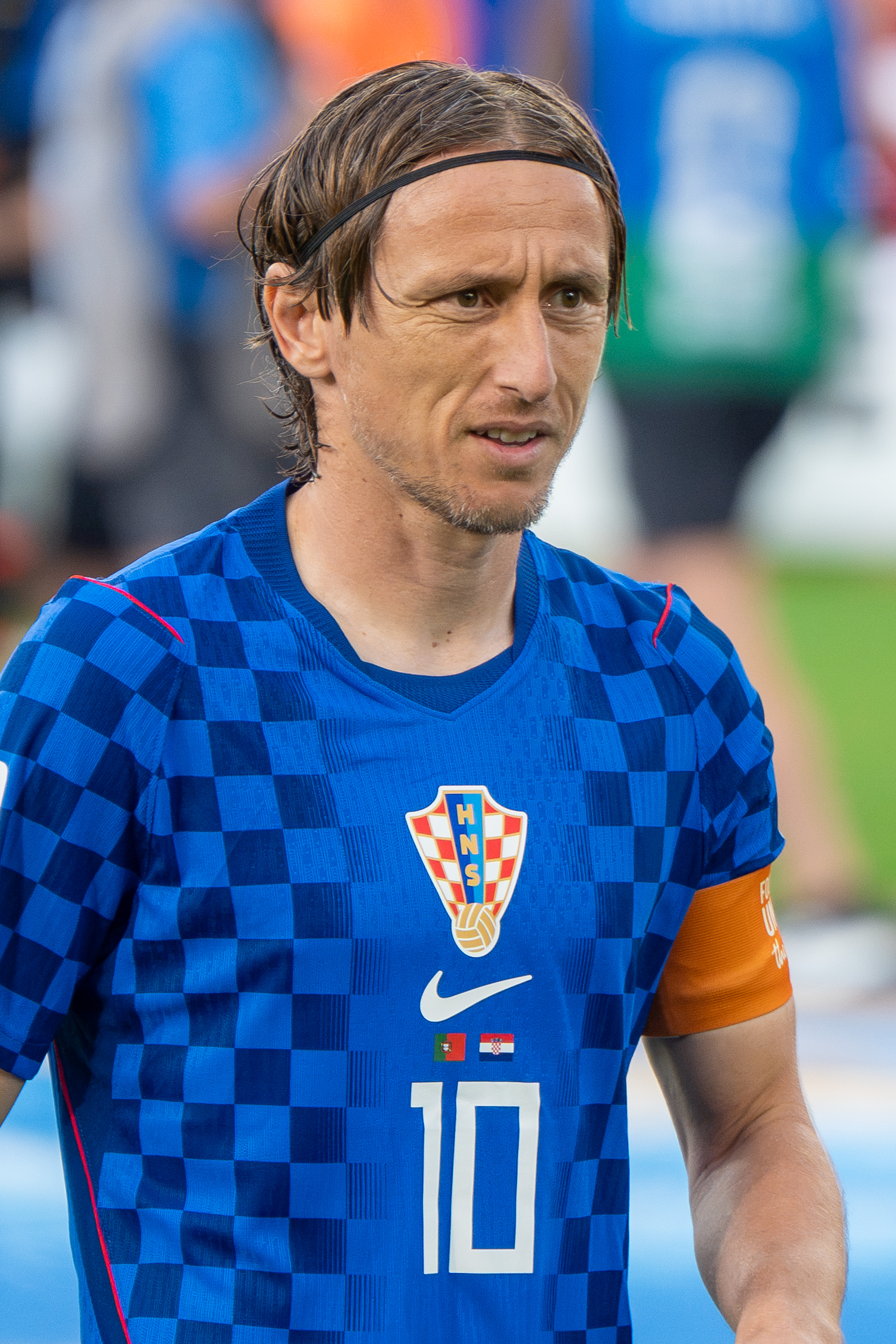
Luka Modrić is Croatia's most capped player.

Rank	Player	Caps	Goals	Career
1	**Luka Modrić**	208	30	2006–present
2	**Ivan Perišić**	163	41	2011–present
3	Darijo Srna	134	22	2002–2016
4	**Mateo Kovačić**	123	5	2013–present
5	**Andrej Kramarić**	119	36	2014–present
6	Stipe Pletikosa	114	0	1999–2014
7	Ivan Rakitić	106	15	2007–2019
8	Josip Šimunić	105	3	2001–2013
8	Domagoj Vida	105	4	2010–2024
10	Ivica Olić	104	20	2002–2015

=== Top goalscorers ===
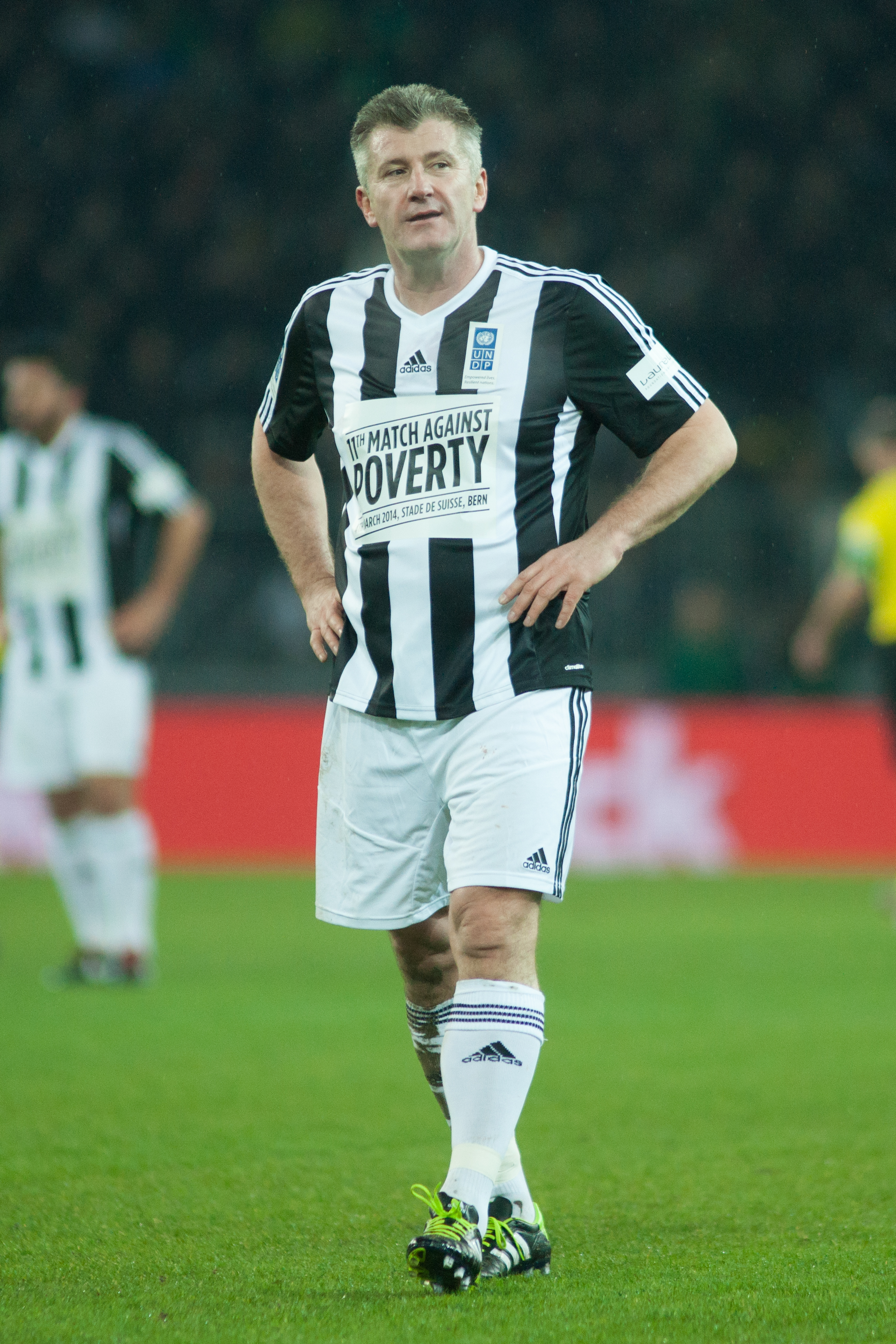
Davor Šuker has been Croatia's top goalscorer since 1998.

Rank	Player	Goals	Caps	Ratio	Career
1	Davor Šuker	45	68	0.65	1991–2002
2	**Ivan Perišić**	41	163	0.25	2011–present
3	**Andrej Kramarić**	36	119	0.3	2014–present
4	Mario Mandžukić	33	89	0.37	2007–2018
5	**Luka Modrić**	30	208	0.14	2006–present
6	Eduardo	29	64	0.45	2004–2014
7	Darijo Srna	22	134	0.16	2002–2016
8	Ivica Olić	20	104	0.19	2002–2015
9	Niko Kranjčar	16	81	0.2	2004–2013
10	Nikola Kalinić	15	42	0.36	2008–2018
10	Goran Vlaović	15	51	0.29	1992–2002
10	Ivan Rakitić	15	106	0.14	2007–2019

=== Most clean sheets ===
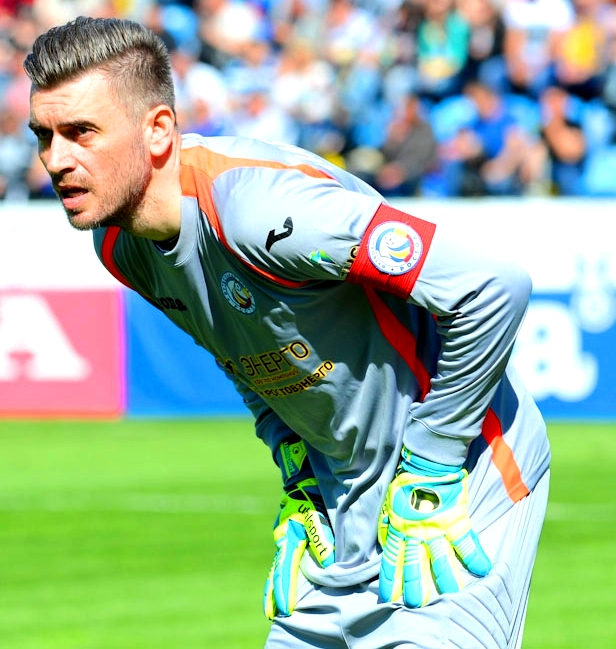
Stipe Pletikosa is Croatia's record holder in clean sheets.

Rank	Player	Clean sheets	Caps	Ratio	Career
1	Stipe Pletikosa	54	114	0.47	1999–2014
2	Dražen Ladić	26	59	0.44	1990–2000
3	**Dominik Livaković**	26	85	0.31	2017–present
4	Danijel Subašić	24	44	0.55	2009–2018
5	Tomislav Butina	15	28	0.54	2001–2006
6	Vedran Runje	9	22	0.41	2006–2011
7	Tonči Gabrić	5	9	0.56	1990–1997
7	Marjan Mrmić	5	13	0.38	1995–1999
9	**Ivica Ivušić**	4	6	0.67	2021–present
9	Lovre Kalinić	4	19	0.21	2014-2022

== Competitive record ==
Champions
Runners-up
Third place
Tournament played fully or partially on home soil

=== FIFA World Cup ===
FIFA World Cup record										Qualification record						
Year	Round	Position	Pld	W	D	L	GF	GA	Squad	Pos	Pld	W	D	L	GF	GA
(Uruguay) 1930	Part of Yugoslavia															
(Kingdom of Italy) 1934	Part of Yugoslavia															
(French Third Republic) 1938	Part of Yugoslavia															
(Fourth Brazilian Republic) 1950	Part of Yugoslavia															
(Switzerland) 1954	Part of Yugoslavia															
(Sweden) 1958	Part of Yugoslavia															
(Chile) 1962	Part of Yugoslavia															
(England) 1966	Part of Yugoslavia															
(Mexico) 1970	Part of Yugoslavia															
(West Germany) 1974	Part of Yugoslavia															
(Argentina) 1978	Part of Yugoslavia															
(Spain) 1982	Part of Yugoslavia															
(Mexico) 1986	Part of Yugoslavia															
(Italy) 1990	Part of Yugoslavia															
(United States) 1994	Did not enter									Did not enter						
(France) 1998	Third place	3rd	7	5	0	2	11	5	Squad	2nd^{OFF}	10	5	4	1	20	13
(South Korea) (Japan) 2002	Group stage	23rd	3	1	0	2	2	3	Squad	1st	8	5	3	0	15	2
(Germany) 2006	Group stage	22nd	3	0	2	1	2	3	Squad	1st	10	7	3	0	21	5
(South Africa) 2010	Did not qualify									3rd	10	6	2	2	19	13
(Brazil) 2014	Group stage	19th	3	1	0	2	6	6	Squad	2nd^{OFF}	12	6	3	3	14	9
(Russia) 2018	Runners-up	2nd	7	4	2	1	14	9	Squad	2nd^{OFF}	12	7	3	2	19	5
(Qatar) 2022	Third place	3rd	7	2	4	1	8	7	Squad	1st	10	7	2	1	21	4
(Canada) (Mexico) (United States) 2026	Round of 32	20th	4	2	0	2	6	7	Squad	1st	8	7	1	0	26	4
(Morocco) (Portugal) (Spain) 2030 (Note: Additional matches are scheduled to be played in Argentina, Paraguay, and Uruguay in commemoration of the 100th anniversary of the first World Cup, however they are not considered to be official hosts of the tournament.)	To be determined									To be determined						
(Saudi Arabia) 2034	To be determined									To be determined						
Total:7/8	Runners-up	2nd	34	15	8	11	49	40	—	7/8	80	50	21	9	155	55

Draws include knockout matches decided via penalty shoot-out; correct as of 2 July 2026 after the match against Portugal.

Matches
First match	Croatia 3–1 Jamaica (Lens, France; 14 June 1998)
Biggest win	Croatia 4–0 Cameroon (Manaus, Brazil; 18 June 2014)
Biggest defeat	Argentina 3–0 Croatia (Lusail, Qatar; 13 December 2022)
Best result	Runners-up in 2018
Worst result	Group stage in 2002, 2006, 2014

=== UEFA European Championship ===
UEFA European Championship record										Qualification record						
Year	Round	Position	Pld	W	D	L	GF	GA	Squad	Pos	Pld	W	D	L	GF	GA
(France) 1960	Part of Yugoslavia															
(Francoist Spain) 1964	Part of Yugoslavia															
(Italy) 1968	Part of Yugoslavia															
(Belgium) 1972	Part of Yugoslavia															
(Socialist Federal Republic of Yugoslavia) 1976	Part of Yugoslavia															
(Italy) 1980	Part of Yugoslavia															
(France) 1984	Part of Yugoslavia															
(West Germany) 1988	Part of Yugoslavia															
(Sweden) 1992	Did not enter									Did not enter						
(England) 1996	Quarter-finals	7th	4	2	0	2	5	5	Squad	1st	10	7	2	1	22	5
(Netherlands) (Belgium) 2000	Did not qualify									3rd	8	4	3	1	13	9
(Portugal) 2004	Group stage	13th	3	0	2	1	4	6	Squad	2nd^{OFF}	10	6	2	2	14	5
(Austria) (Switzerland) 2008	Quarter-finals	5th	4	3	1	0	5	2	Squad	1st	12	9	2	1	28	8
(Poland) (Ukraine) 2012	Group stage	10th	3	1	1	1	4	3	Squad	2nd^{OFF}	12	8	2	2	21	7
(France) 2016	Round of 16	9th	4	2	1	1	5	4	Squad	2nd	10	6	3	1	20	5
(Europe) 2020	Round of 16	14th	4	1	1	2	7	8	Squad	1st	8	5	2	1	17	7
(Germany) 2024	Group stage	20th	3	0	2	1	3	6	Squad	2nd	8	5	1	2	13	4
(United Kingdom) (Republic of Ireland) 2028	To be determined									To be determined						
(Italy) (Turkey) 2032	To be determined									To be determined						
Total	Quarter-finals	7/8	25	9	8	8	33	34	—	7/8	78	50	17	11	148	50

Draws include knockout matches decided via penalty shoot-out; correct as of 24 June 2024 after the match against Italy.

Matches
First match	Croatia 1–0 Turkey (Nottingham, England; 11 June 1996)
Biggest win	Croatia 3–0 Denmark (Sheffield, England; 16 June 1996)
Biggest defeat	Portugal 3–0 Croatia (Nottingham, England; 19 June 1996) Spain 3–0 Croatia (Berlin, Germany; 15 June 2024)
Best result	Quarter-finals in 1996, 2008
Worst result	Group stage in 2004, 2012, 2024

=== UEFA Nations League ===
UEFA Nations League record												Finals record								
Season	LG	Grp	Pos	Pld	W	D	L	GF	GA	P/R	IR	Year	Round	Pld	W	D	L	GF	GA	Squad
2018–19	A	4	3rd	4	1	1	2	4	10	Same position	9th	(Portugal) 2019	Did not qualify							
2020–21	A	3	3rd	6	1	0	5	9	16	Same position	12th	(Italy) 2021	Did not qualify							
2022–23	A	1	1st	6	4	1	1	8	6	Same position	2nd	(Netherlands) 2023	Runners-up	2	1	1	0	4	2	Squad
2024–25	A	1	2nd	6	2	2	2	8	8	Same position	8th	(Germany) 2025	Did not qualify							
2024–25	A	Quarter-finals		2	1	0	1	2	2	Same position	8th	(Germany) 2025	Did not qualify							
2026–27	A	3	3rd	6	2	0	4	7	17	TBD	12th	2027	Did not qualify							
2026–27	A	Relegation play-off		0	0	0	0	0	0	TBD	12th	2027	Did not qualify							
Total				30	11	4	15	38	59	2nd		Total:1/5	Runners-up	2	1	1	0	4	2	—

Draws include knockout matches decided via penalty shoot-out; correct as of 15 November 2026, after the match against Czech Republic.

Matches
First match	Spain 6–0 Croatia (Elche, Spain; 11 September 2018)
Biggest win	Austria 1–3 Croatia (Vienna, Austria; 25 September 2022) Netherlands 2–4 Croatia (Rotterdam, Netherlands; 14 June 2023) Croatia 2–0 France (Split, Croatia; 20 March 2025)
Biggest defeat	Croatia 0–7 England (Rijeka, Croatia; 3 October 2026)
Best result	Runners-up in 2022–23
Worst result	12th place in 2020–21, 2026–27

== Head-to-head record ==
Key

More wins than losses
As many wins as losses
Fewer wins than losses

Correct as of 15 November 2026, after the match against Czechia.
Source: Croatian Football Federation

Pre-independence
Opponent	Pld	W	D	L	GF	GA	GD	Win %
Bulgaria	1	1	0	0	6	0	+6	100.00
Germany	3	0	0	3	2	12	−10	0.00
Hungary	3	0	2	1	2	3	−1	0.00
Indonesia	1	1	0	0	5	2	+3	100.00
Italy	1	0	0	1	0	4	−4	0.00
Romania	1	0	1	0	2	2	+0	0.00
Slovakia	7	6	1	0	25	9	+16	85.71
Switzerland	3	2	0	1	5	1	+4	66.67
Total: 8 teams played	20	10	4	6	47	33	+14	50.00

Post-independence
Opponent	Pld	W	D	L	GF	GA	GD	Win %	Confederation
Albania	1	0	1	0	2	2	+0	0.00	UEFA
Andorra	6	6	0	0	24	0	+24	100.00	UEFA
Argentina	6	2	1	3	7	8	−1	33.33	CONMEBOL
Armenia	3	2	1	0	3	1	+2	66.67	UEFA
Australia	6	2	2	2	11	6	+5	33.33	AFC
Austria	7	6	0	1	12	6	+6	85.71	UEFA
Azerbaijan	4	2	2	0	9	2	+7	50.00	UEFA
Belarus	2	2	0	0	4	1	+3	100.00	UEFA
Belgium	10	3	3	4	9	8	+1	30.00	UEFA
Bosnia and Herzegovina	4	4	0	0	14	6	+8	100.00	UEFA
Brazil	6	0	2	4	4	11	−7	0.00	CONMEBOL
Bulgaria	8	5	2	1	12	6	+6	62.50	UEFA
Cameroon	1	1	0	0	4	0	+4	100.00	CAF
Canada	1	1	0	0	4	1	+3	100.00	CONCACAF
Chile	1	0	1	0	1	1	+0	0.00	CONMEBOL
China	1	0	1	0	1	1	+0	0.00	AFC
Colombia	1	1	0	0	2	1	+1	100.00	CONMEBOL
Cyprus	3	3	0	0	6	0	+6	100.00	UEFA
Czech Republic	8	4	4	0	17	9	+8	50.00	UEFA
Denmark	8	4	2	2	11	8	+3	50.00	UEFA
Ecuador	1	0	0	1	0	1	−1	0.00	CONMEBOL
Egypt	2	1	1	0	6	4	+2	50.00	CAF
England	14	3	2	9	16	35	−19	21.43	UEFA
Estonia	9	6	2	1	16	5	+11	66.67	UEFA
Faroe Islands	2	2	0	0	4	1	+3	100.00	UEFA
Finland	2	1	1	0	2	1	+1	50.00	UEFA
France	12	2	3	7	12	22	−10	16.67	UEFA
Georgia	3	2	0	1	4	3	+1	66.67	UEFA
Germany	5	2	1	2	8	6	+2	40.00	UEFA
Ghana	1	1	0	0	2	1	+1	100.00	CAF
Gibraltar	3	3	0	0	14	0	+14	100.00	UEFA
Greece	8	2	4	2	10	9	+1	25.00	UEFA
Hong Kong	1	1	0	0	4	0	+4	100.00	AFC
Hungary	9	4	4	1	17	7	+10	44.44	UEFA
Iceland	7	5	1	1	13	3	+10	71.43	UEFA
Iran	2	1	1	0	4	2	+2	50.00	AFC
Israel	9	8	1	0	22	8	+14	88.89	UEFA
Italy	9	3	6	0	11	7	+4	33.33	UEFA
Jamaica	1	1	0	0	3	1	+2	100.00	CONCACAF
Japan	4	1	2	1	5	5	+0	25.00	AFC
Jordan	1	1	0	0	2	1	+1	100.00	AFC
Kazakhstan	2	2	0	0	5	1	+4	100.00	UEFA
Kosovo	2	2	0	0	7	0	+7	100.00	UEFA
Latvia	6	6	0	0	17	1	+16	100.00	UEFA
Liechtenstein	2	2	0	0	8	2	+6	100.00	UEFA
Lithuania	2	1	1	0	2	0	+2	50.00	UEFA
Mali	1	1	0	0	2	1	+1	100.00	CAF
Malta	10	9	1	0	29	5	+24	90.00	UEFA
Mexico	6	4	0	2	9	6	+3	66.67	CONCACAF
Moldova	2	2	0	0	2	0	+2	100.00	UEFA
Montenegro	2	2	0	0	7	2	+5	100.00	UEFA
Morocco	3	1	2	0	4	3	+1	33.33	CAF
Netherlands	3	2	0	1	6	6	+0	66.67	UEFA
Nigeria	1	1	0	0	2	0	+2	100.00	CAF
North Macedonia	9	6	2	1	15	9	+6	66.67	UEFA
Northern Ireland	1	1	0	0	3	0	+3	100.00	UEFA
Norway	5	3	1	1	10	6	+4	60.00	UEFA
Panama	1	1	0	0	1	0	+1	100.00	CONCACAF
Peru	1	0	0	1	0	2	−2	0.00	CONMEBOL
Poland	7	4	2	1	11	6	+5	57.14	UEFA
Portugal	11	1	2	8	9	21	−12	9.09	UEFA
Qatar	1	1	0	0	3	2	+1	100.00	AFC
Republic of Ireland	7	2	3	2	8	8	+0	28.57	UEFA
Romania	3	3	0	0	4	1	+3	100.00	UEFA
Russia	6	2	4	0	6	3	+3	33.33	UEFA
San Marino	3	3	0	0	18	0	+18	100.00	UEFA
Saudi Arabia	1	1	0	0	1	0	+1	100.00	AFC
Scotland	8	2	3	3	7	8	−1	25.00	UEFA
Senegal	1	1	0	0	2	1	+1	100.00	CAF
Serbia (Note: Includes the records against the no longer active FR Yugoslavia national team, whose successor is considered by UEFA and FIFA to be Serbia national team.)	4	1	3	0	5	3	+2	25.00	UEFA
Slovakia	10	5	3	2	18	11	+7	50.00	UEFA
Slovenia	13	8	4	1	22	11	+11	61.54	UEFA
South Korea	7	3	2	2	11	7	+4	42.86	AFC
Spain	13	3	2	8	14	29	−15	23.08	UEFA
Sweden	6	4	0	2	8	7	+1	66.67	UEFA
Switzerland	4	1	2	1	6	7	−1	25.00	UEFA
Tunisia	2	0	1	1	1	2	−1	0.00	CAF
Turkey	12	4	6	2	15	10	+5	33.33	UEFA
Ukraine	9	5	3	1	15	5	+10	55.56	UEFA
United States	1	1	0	0	2	1	+1	100.00	CONCACAF
Wales	8	4	3	1	12	7	+5	50.00	UEFA
Total: 81 teams played	386	202	101	83	656	391	+265	52.33	

== FIFA ranking history ==
The following is a chart of yearly averages of Croatia's FIFA World Ranking. Upon admission to FIFA in 1994, Croatia entered the World Ranking at 125th. Their debut World Cup campaign, during 1998, propelled Croatia to third place after the tournament, marking the fastest ascension in FIFA ranking history. It hit a then-record Elo rating of 2,006 points in July 1998 and maintained third place until February 1999. The national team recorded its highest Elo rating in June 2023 with 2,012 points. With an average Elo rating of 1,877 points, Croatia maintained the sixth-highest average rating in the world in 2022. As of June 2026, Croatia maintains an Elo Rating of 1,912. They are one of three teams—along with Colombia and France—to be named FIFA Best Mover of the Year more than once, winning the award in 1994 and 1998.

View source data.

== Honours ==
=== Global ===
- FIFA World Cup
  - Runners-up: 2018
  - Third place: 1998, 2022

=== Continental ===
- UEFA Nations League
  - Runners-up: 2023

=== Friendly ===
- Hassan II Trophy
  - Champions: 1996
- Korea Cup
  - Champions: 1999
- FIFA Series
  - Champions: 2024

=== Awards ===
- FIFA Best Mover of the Year: 1994, 1998

=== Summary ===
Competition	1st place, gold medalist(s)	2nd place, silver medalist(s)	3rd place, bronze medalist(s)	Total
FIFA World Cup	0	1	2	3
UEFA Nations League	0	1	0	1
Total	0	2	2	4

== See also ==
- Croatia national football B team
- Croatia national under-23 football team
- Croatia national under-21 football team
- Croatia national under-20 football team
- Croatia national under-19 football team
- Croatia national under-18 football team
- Croatia national under-17 football team
- Croatia national under-16 football team
- Croatia national under-15 football team
- Croatia women's national football team
- Croatia women's national under-19 football team
- Croatia women's national under-17 football team
- Croatia women's national under-15 football team
