= Jozo Jakopić =

Personal information
- Date of birth: 1 April 1904
- Place of birth: Ljubinje, Bosnia and Herzegovina, Austria-Hungary
- Date of death: 6 November 1946 (aged 42)
- Place of death: Zürich, Switzerland

Managerial career
- Years: Team
- 1940–1941: Banovina of Croatia

Jozo Jakopić (1 April 1904–6 November 1946) was a Yugoslav and a Croat sports official and a long-time secretary of the most successful Croatian football club at the time HŠK Građanski. He also served as the first manager of the Croatia national football team, representing the Banovina, from 1940 to 1941.

== Biography ==
Jakopić was born in Ljubinje, at the time part of Austria-Hungary. Josip Torbar, the president of the HŠK Građanski football club, appointed Jakopić as the club's secretary.

Jakopić became a manager of the Croatia national football team in 1940 and led Croatia in four friendly matches. The first, unofficial match was played against Switzerland on 2 April 1940 in Zagreb, which ended in a 4–0 victory for Croatia. Ten of the eleven players were from Građanski, while one was Concordia's player. Croatia also won in the away match played in Bern (0–1). This time, all eleven players were from Građanski. The first official match was played against Hungary in Budapest on 2 May 1940. The match ended in a 0–1 loss. Ten players were from Građanski and one was from Concordia. The second match against Hungary was played in Zagreb on 8 December 1940, ending in a 1–1 draw. Nine players were from Građanski, two from Hajduk and one from Concordia.

With the establishment of the Independent State of Croatia after Germany and Italy invaded Yugoslavia in April 1941, Jakopović was persecuted by the newly appointed Ustaše regime. Bogdan Cuvaj was appointed as Croatia's new manager in 1941. Jakopović eventually fled to Zürich in Switzerland, where he died and was buried there.
