= Concerns and controversies related to UEFA Euro 2012 =

Association football controversies

Concerns and controversies related to UEFA Euro 2012 covers, the themes and issues surrounding the 2012 UEFA European Football Championship in Poland and Ukraine. After Poland and Ukraine were chosen by a vote of the UEFA Executive Committee as host countries for UEFA Euro 2012, several issues arose. Preparation work proceeded more speedily in Poland than in Ukraine and, following a visit in April 2009, Michel Platini announced that all was on track and he saw no major problems. UEFA confirmed the appointment of the Polish cities of Warsaw, Poznań, Wrocław and Gdańsk. At the same meeting, an appeal for the delayed decision on the Ukrainian venues was granted to Lviv, Donetsk, and Kharkiv in order to meet specific conditions regarding infrastructure, with a warning that only Kyiv and the best prepared city of the other candidates would otherwise be used if issues were not resolved by the end of November, though it took heavy amount of time and resources

== Criticism of preparations ==
In January 2008, UEFA President Michel Platini warned the organisers of the need to avoid "critical slippages" in their preparations, prompting Scotland to volunteer as an alternative host twice. By June 2008, however, UEFA stated they were "not discussing any plan B in terms of new countries" hosting.

Ukraine reported several problems which threatened their ability to co-host, including delays in the renovation of Kyiv's Olympic Stadium, and difficulties funding infrastructure work due to the 2008 financial crisis. After an inspection in April 2009, Platini re-affirmed that Ukraine would remain co-host, hinting that most matches could go to Poland. Polish Prime Minister Donald Tusk stated that his country would be capable of the task, but was committed to the original plans, as was the Polish Football Association (PZPN).

In September 2009, Platini announced that "Ukraine has made sudden progress in their efforts to stage the tournament," and it was soon confirmed that their four cities (Donetsk, Kharkiv, Kyiv, and Lviv) would host matches. Kyiv was also confirmed to host the final match.

An interview Platini gave to the German Football Association (DFB) in May 2010 suggested that Germany and Hungary could replace Ukraine unless improvements were made, casting new doubt on the nation's readiness. By August, however, Platini revisited that and stated, "You can consider that the ultimatum no longer exists," and that he was optimistic about preparations in both countries and saw no major obstacles. After a UEFA delegation visited Ukraine in September 2011, he stated the country was "virtually ready for Euro 2012."

== Suspension of the Polish Football Association ==
In September 2008, the Government of Poland suspended the Polish Football Association (PZPN) over corruption issues and assigned an administrator to fight against corruption in football. UEFA swiftly issued a letter warning that it risked losing the right to co-host. Further, FIFA threatened that it would suspend Polish football representation in qualifying matches for the World Cup. In October an agreement was reached that reinstalled PZPN with a new management and monitored by FIFA, UEFA and the Polish Ministry of Sports.

== Boycott calls ==
Following Yulia Tymoshenko's hunger strike which started on 20 April 2012 and her mistreatment in a Ukrainian prison, European Commission President José Manuel Barroso, the Justice Commissioner Viviane Reding, and Androulla Vassiliou. the European Commissioner for Education, Culture, Multilingualism and Youth, announced they would boycott the tournament in Ukraine. The Austrian Chancellor, Werner Faymann, announced in May that Austrian government officials would not attend the tournament as a "political signal." Belgium's government officials announced they would boycott games held in Ukraine, with Belgian Foreign Minister Didier Reynders calling on Ukraine's government to respect all of Tymoshenko's rights. Germany announced that German Chancellor Angela Merkel's visit would depend on Tymoshenko's release, and Merkel urged her ministers to do the same. Germany's Interior and sports minister Hans-Peter Friedrich boycotted country's match against the Netherlands in Kharkiv. The manager of Bayern Munich, Jupp Heynckes, called on the President of UEFA, Platini, to condemn Ukraine's authoritarian regime, and the manager of Borussia Dortmund, Jürgen Klopp, stated that he would boycott the event. However, German sports officials said that such boycotts are ineffective and the event should go ahead. Polish Prime Minister Donald Tusk criticised calls for a boycott saying that they were inappropriate, but added that Ukraine's reputation would "suffer dramatically" without a solution. Poland's opposition party was in favour of boycotting matches in Ukraine to change the decision on Tymoshenko.

Ukraine compared the threats of boycott by European powers as a return to Cold War tactics. In a statement, UEFA said it "alerted the Ukrainian delegation about the concerns raised by the political situation in Ukraine among European politicians and media", but that "UEFA has no position and will not take any regarding the political situation in Ukraine, and will not interfere with internal government matters." Meanwhile, the heads of state of Austria, Czech Republic, Germany, Italy and Slovenia reportedly turned down an invitation to attend a summit of central and eastern European leaders that Ukraine was due to hold. The European Union asserted that all its commissioners would boycott the events in Ukraine. Russian President Vladimir Putin reacted in saying that the boycott call was wrong and offered to give Tymoshenko medical treatment in his country, this was rejected. Ukraine's Foreign Ministry added that the threat of boycott could "hurt mutual understanding" and that they "view as destructive attempts to politicise sporting events, which since ancient times have played a paramount role in improving understanding and agreement between nations. An attack on this big dream undermines the chances of...all the former Socialist Bloc members to prove that their economic, human and scientific potential can turn them from the debtors of Europe to its engine of growth."

== Sensationalism, racism, antisemitism and hooliganism ==
=== Panorama documentary and reaction ===
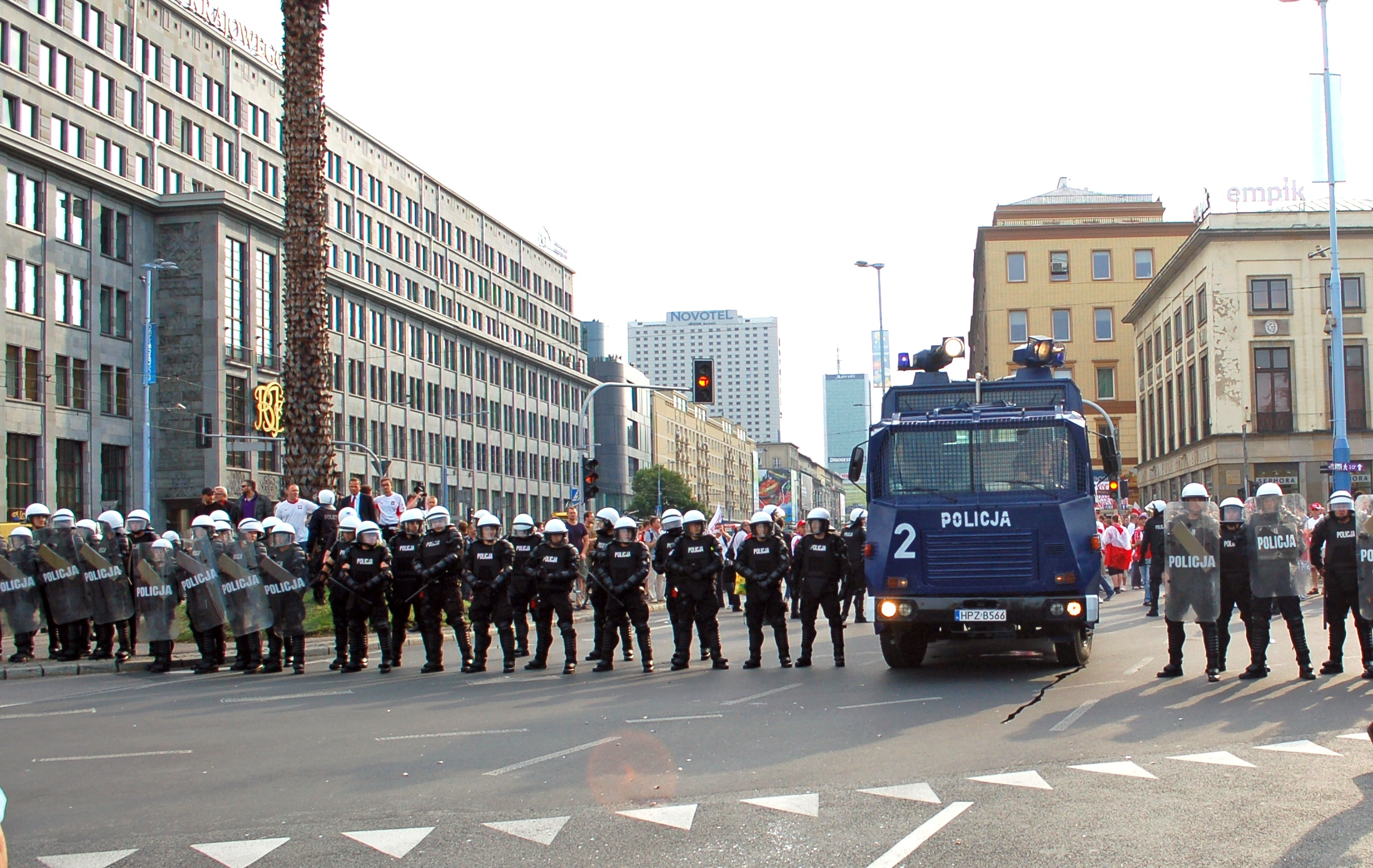
Police in Warsaw on 12 June 2012.

On 28 May 2012, BBC current affairs programme Panorama examined the issues of racism, antisemitism and football hooliganism which it stated were prevalent among Polish and Ukrainian supporters. The programme, titled Euro 2012: Stadiums of Hate, included recent footage of supporters in chanting various antisemitic slogans and displays of white power symbols and banners. The documentary recorded antisemitism and monkey noise taunts of black players in Poland. In Ukraine, it recorded Nazi salutes and FC Metalist Kharkiv supporters violently assaulting a group of South Asian students at the Metalist Oblast Sports Complex, one of the stadiums hosting matches in Ukraine. Panorama filmed black former England defender Sol Campbell watching these clips, and then asked him whether he would recommend families go to the Championship. He responded: "Stay at home, watch it on TV. Don't even risk it... because you could end up coming back in a coffin."

The report was then followed up by most of the British media, which published a large number of articles accusing Poles and Ukrainians of racism.

The documentary was criticised as sensationalist, unbalanced and unethical. Jonathan Ornstein, the executive director of the Jewish Community Centre of Kraków, a Jewish source used in the film said: "I am furious at the way the BBC has exploited me as a source. The organization used me and others to manipulate the serious subject of anti-Semitism for its own sensationalist agenda... the BBC knowingly cheated its own audience - the British people - by concocting a false horror story about Poland. In doing so, the BBC has spread fear, ignorance, prejudice and hatred. I am profoundly disturbed by this unethical form of journalism."

Another source used in the film, anti-racism campaigner Jacek Purski said: "The material prepared by the BBC is one-sided. It does not show the whole story of Polish preparations for the Euros. It does not show the Championship ran a lot of activities aimed at combating racism in the "Respect Diversity" campaign. For us the Euro is not only about matches. The event has become an opportunity to fight effectively against racism and promote multiculturalism. There is no country in Europe free from racism. These are the facts."

Black Polish MP John Godson said: "The documentary was biased, one sided and rather sensational. I have received information that there were also interviews that were omitted by the BBC—for example interview with the Polish police."

A reporter from Gazeta Wyborcza, Poland's biggest liberal newspaper, questioned Panorama's practices and said: "I am becoming more and more surprised with what the BBC says. So far it has denied two situations I witnessed. I would not be surprised if the BBC prepared a statement saying that the Panorama crew has never been to Poland."

Ukrainian foreign ministry spokesman Oleh Voloshyn responded that the allegations were an "invented and mythical problem", and that "Nazi symbols can be seen at ... any match in England". Polish Prime Minister Donald Tusk stated: "Nobody who comes to Poland will be in any danger because of his race. This is not our custom, as is not pointing out similar incidents in other countries."

The Guardian reported: "Other sources have come forward to say that an interview with a Jewish Israeli player was also cut from the programme because he failed to confirm Panorama's "anti-semitism" thesis. The BBC interviewed midfielder Aviram Baruchian, who played shortly for the Polish team Polonia Warsaw. One source who was present said the Panorama journalists had complained afterwards that the interview was "useless". Panorama strongly denies this."

Panorama responded to the criticism, saying: "England Fans, the official England Supporters' Club, travelling to Euro 2012 called the programme unhelpful and some Poles in the UK have expressed concern that they have been labelled as racist. But amid all of these accusations against Panorama and the BBC, there is a real fear that the key issue has been missed - the overt and frightening racist and anti-Semitic abuse and violence of the kind broadcast by Panorama is both wrong and deeply upsetting to those on its receiving end. That was the point of the programme. We set out to highlight a wrong. Were the beatings that the students from India sustained in Ukraine's Metalist stadium somehow "exaggerated"? Was the fact that they said the police were of "no use" as they walked off bruised and alone into the Ukrainian night somehow "made up"? Were the monkey chants hurled at the black players we filmed in Poland somehow "sensationalised"?

Brendan O'Neill, the editor of Spiked wrote that England fans had staged "a protest against BBC Panorama's hysterical depiction of Ukraine as a hotbed of racism and anti-Semitism, which they have discovered during their stay in that country to be untrue. ...it was the respectable Beeb, echoed by broadsheets, which painted an entire nation "over there" as backward and prejudiced, while it has fallen to everyday fans to poke holes in this xenophobic mythmaking and to point out that there is actually nothing scary about modern Ukraine and its inhabitants. England fans have proven themselves way more racially enlightened than the aloof suits in the current-affairs department of the BBC."

England football coach Roy Hodgson said the racism allegations were "the biggest negativity in England... As a result I think we've lost a lot of fans who didn't come because of a lot of horror stories about how life would be in the Ukraine and Poland." Hodgson added that he had nothing but positive impressions of Poland and Ukraine.

The Daily Mirror commented: "The biggest plus of Euro 2012 must be the scaremongering presented by BBC's Panorama of violence and terrible racism in Poland and Ukraine largely proved to be just that. If you do not believe me, then take the word of Gary Lineker who did not mind taking a swipe at his BBC bosses to point out how friendly and accommodating the locals have been. Ahead of Spain's semi with Portugal, Lineker tweeted: "Donetsk is a lovely town with friendly folk. Pre-tournament scaremongering way off the mark"."

=== Other incidents ===
According to the Dutch daily de Telegraaf, during an open training session in Kraków, Dutch black players were allegedly subjected to monkey noises and jeers, an incident that the Netherlands captain Mark van Bommel described as a "real disgrace". UEFA acknowledged that there had been "isolated incidents of racist chanting". However, other Dutch media, including the prestigious daily de Volkskrant, have reported that the allegations of monkey chants were made up. According to the newspaper, the coach of the Dutch team has made several statements to the BBC that he had not heard the supposed chanting, nor did the rest of the team. According to de Volksrant, the story was sensationalized by de Telegraaf.

The first incidence of hooliganism at Euro 2012 happened on 8 June 2012 after Russia vs Czech Republic in Wrocław. Russian hooligans were violent against Polish stewards at the Wrocław's Municipal Stadium. Around 30 Russian hooligans attacked a handful of stewards. Four stewards needed hospital treatment after this attack.

On 11 June 2012, before the Euro 2012 match between Croatia and Ireland, Croatian football fans clashed with riot police in the Polish city of Poznań. Croatian fans threw chairs, bottles and flares at Polish riot police. The incident began after a clash between intoxicated supporters of two rival Croatian teams from Zagreb and Split in one of the city centre's bars, shortly after 5:00 pm. Croatia was also later charged with racist chants and symbols against Mario Balotelli in the Italy game with anti-discrimination monitors reporting monkey noises were being made as well as far-right Ustaše nationalist flags being displayed. A photographer for the AFP also reported monkey noises made and spotting a steward picking up a banana that was thrown onto the pitch. The Croatian FA was fined $101,000 for this racial abuse and for setting off fireworks in the same match.

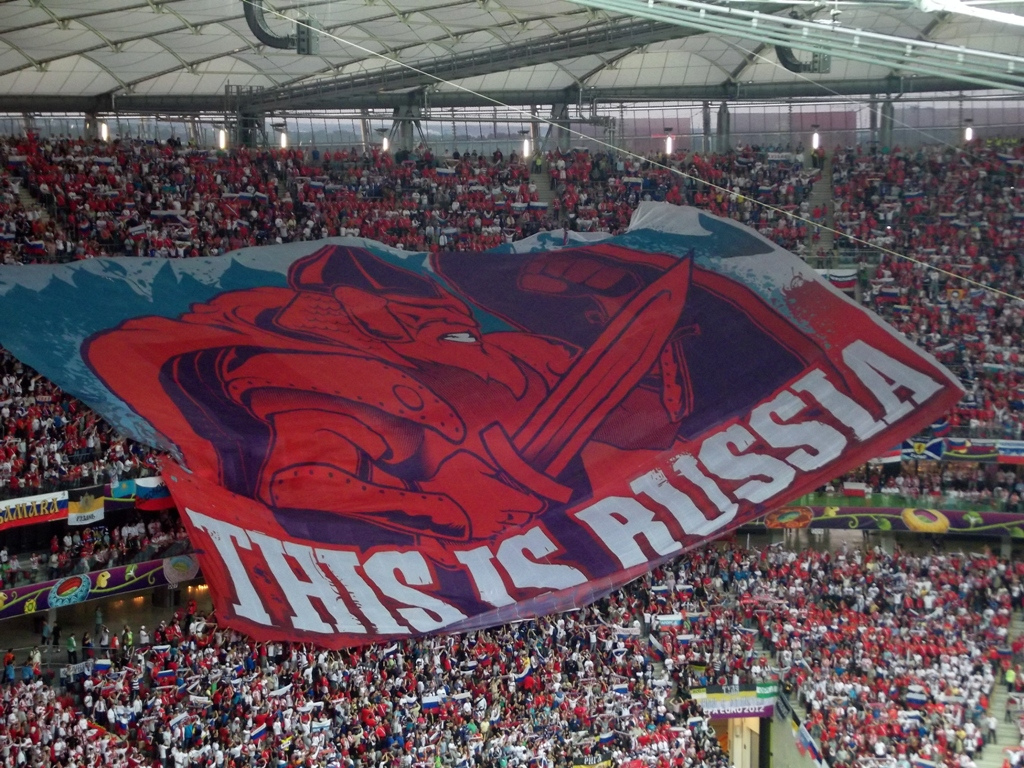
A flag unfurled by Russian fans at the Poland-Russia match on the 12th of June

A clash involving Russian and Polish hooligans took place in Warsaw on 12 June 2012. The violence broke out when, during a march organised by Russian fans celebrating Russia Day before the Poland vs. Russia game at Warsaw's National Stadium, rival groups of supporters began to provoke each other with insulting chants. The Polish Police fired warning shots and used water cannon to disperse rival groups of fans; around 100 arrests were made and ten people hospitalised – seven Poles, two Russians and one German. In the same match Russian fans displayed a huge "This is Russia" banner during Russian national anthem in reference to World War II Soviet invasion of Poland.

Germany fans were charged with displaying "inappropriate banners and symbols", and fined $12,550 for bombarding Portuguese players with paper balls during their group match in Lviv.

UEFA has opened proceedings to fine both the football federations of Spain and Russia. Spanish fans were accused of chants to black Italian player Mario Balotelli, and Russian fans showed similar behavior in their game against the Czech Republic, where Theodor Gebre Selassie noted racial chants from Russian fans.

Disorder broke out in Bedford, England after Italy defeated England on 24 June. In the town with a large Italian diaspora, about 150 England fans targeted Italian fans; cars were damaged, there were four arrests and one person was hurt, but not seriously. Some English Twitter users were investigated by police on accusations of racially abusing black English players Ashley Cole and Ashley Young, whose missed penalties caused the team to exit the tournament.

== Ambush marketing and discrepancy in disciplinary ==
Denmark forward Nicklas Bendtner was fined €100,000 and received a one-match ban by UEFA for unauthorised sponsorship during the group stage game against Portugal. After scoring his and Denmark's second goal in the 3–2 defeat, Bendtner lowered his shorts to reveal the logo of Irish bookmakers Paddy Power on the waistband of his underwear. UEFA's disciplinary action against Bendtner came under scrutiny by critics due to the severity of the punishment when compared to other incidents which have been investigated by the governing body, where lower fines were handed out for incidents considered to be much more severe in nature. These include a €20,000 fine for FC Porto in April that year for racist abuse from their fans during a UEFA Europa League game, a €30,000 fine for Manchester City in the same month for delaying the restart of a match in the competition, and a €40,000 fine and a three-match ban for Arsenal manager Arsène Wenger in March for confronting the referee in the UEFA Champions League.

== Animal cruelty ==
Ukraine came under criticism from animal welfare organisations for killing stray cats and dogs in order to prepare for Euro 2012. On 13 November 2011 the Ukrainian Ministry of Ecology and Natural Resources urged mayors around the country to stop the killings for six months and build shelters instead, but it was unclear how this measure will be enforced. The ministry's comments also suggested this would only be a temporary measure, drawing further criticism. Mykola Zlochevsky, minister of the environment, said that amendments would be made to the Ukrainian legislation regarding the treatment of stray animals. The minister also agreed a programme of construction for new animal shelters, the first to be completed by June 2012, and the introduction of new legislation making it "compulsory for city mayors to enforce such new regulations or run the risk of facing prosecution." In spite of these promises, in April 2012 it was found that dog killings were continuing unabated.

== Terrorism ==
On 27 April 2012, four bombs went off in Dnipropetrovsk in Ukraine (which was not a host city). At least 29 people were injured in what was described as a terrorist attack. Ukrainian President Viktor Yanukovych said that there would be an "adequate" response. Hryhoriy Surkis, then head of the Ukrainian Football Federation, said that he "[thought] the people who committed this brutal crime...are also accomplices to an attack on the image of our country ahead of the Euro-2012." UEFA responded to the incident by saying that it was confident of having a "smooth and festive tournament," however, if the political situation were to become more unstable, UEFA was reported have been open to the idea of the postponing the event until 2013. Following serious security concerns, Ángel María Villar, the Royal Spanish Football Federation president, reportedly offered to stage Euro 2012 in Spain.

== Protests ==
The FEMEN group protested against a feared surge in prostitution and what they argue are Ukrainian government moves to legalise prostitution during the championships. Activists staged several topless protests, some on the Euro 2012 trophy while it was on public display. The group asked UEFA and the Ukrainian government to create a social program devoted to the problem of sex tourism and prostitution in Ukraine; to inform football fans that prostitution is illegal in Ukraine; and to take additional steps to fight against prostitution and sex tourism.

== Hotels overcharging ==
In April 2012, while on an inspection trip to the host city of Lviv, UEFA president Michel Platini labelled hoteliers as "bandits and crooks" for raising hotel prices in Ukraine for Euro 2012. President Yanukovych ordered his government to prevent hoteliers from charging inflated prices. Some hoteliers had increased prices eighty-fold, causing Prime Minister Mykola Azarov to warn that state control of hotel tariffs might be introduced. Later that month, Markian Lubkivsky, head of the Euro 2012 organizing committee in Ukraine, said hotel and hostel prices were no longer "critically" inflated.

== Manipulations of live transmission ==
The television transmission was not completely live. Several scenes were mounted into the transmission as thought appropriate, or cut out, or left out altogether. On the order of UEFA it was forbidden to show the empty seats in the stadiums. The scene where the German coach Joachim Löw trolls a ball boy actually happened before the match. The same is true for the footage of a German fan's tears, which happened before the match, but was shown after the Italian goal. The German broadcasting agency ARD expressed its intention to file a complaint against these practices by UEFA.

== Goal-line technology ==
During the final matchday of the group stage, on 19 June, the match between England and Ukraine featured a "ghost goal" by Marko Dević. In the second half, with Ukraine losing 1–0 to a header from Wayne Rooney, Dević's shot was hooked clear from behind the England goal-line by John Terry under the eyes of the fifth official standing beside the goal (as confirmed by video replays). England ultimately won the group (after Sweden overturned France in the night's other game) and Ukraine went out of the tournament. Dević's "ghost goal" reopened football's goal-line technology debate. Replays of the build-up also appeared to show Ukrainian forward Artem Milevskyi in an offside position when the ball was played to him, which also went unnoticed by the officials.

== Loss of public money ==
The Polish government station TVP bought exclusive rights to show the games in Poland for 120 million złoty and lost at least 50 million złoty due to lower advertising revenue.
