= Giovanni Vio =

Italian football manager

Personal information
- Full name: Gianni Vio
- Date of birth: 6 April 1953 (age 73)
- Place of birth: Venice, Italy

Giovanni Vio (born 6 April 1953) is an Italian football coach. He was previously employed as the set piece coach of Premier League club Tottenham Hotspur, leaving in the summer of 2023.

Previously, Vio often worked with former Italy and Inter player Walter Zenga, when he was in charge at clubs such as Catania, Palermo and Cagliari.

During his time at Catania, Vio earned the nickname 'the little wizard' as 17 of the team's 44 goals that season came from set pieces.
