= Bogdan Cuvaj =

Croatian football manager

Personal information
- Date of birth: 21 October 1905
- Place of birth: Zagreb, Croatia-Slavonia, Austria-Hungary
- Date of death: 23 July 1983 (aged 77)
- Place of death: Zagreb, SR Croatia, SFR Yugoslavia

Managerial career
- Years: Team
- 1929–1934: Concordia
- 1941–1943: Independent State of Croatia
- 1945–1946: Metalac
- 1946–1952: Lokomotiva
- 1952–1955: Tekstilac
- 1956: Dinamo Zagreb
- 1958–1962: Kickers Offenbach

Bogdan Cuvaj (21 October 1905 – 23 July 1983) was a Croatian football manager in both club and international competition.

== Career ==
He became the manager of Concordia Zagreb's youth side in 1926. After receiving managerial training in Vienna, Cuvaj became Concordia's manager in 1931, a position he held until the club was banned in 1945. With the club he won the 1932 Yugoslavian championship and the 1942 Croatian championship. From March 6, 1939 he served as secretary of the Croatian Football Federation and also managed his country under the flag of the Independent State of Croatia, a World War II-era puppet state of Nazi Germany from 1941 to 1945.

After World War II he managed Tekstilac Zagreb (1945–1946), Lokomotiva Zagreb (1946–1952), Metalac Zagreb (1952–1955) and Dinamo Zagreb (1955–1956).
