= Kovin Fortress =

Strategic fortification in south-western Serbia

Kovin Ковин
- Džurovo, near Prijepolje; Serbia
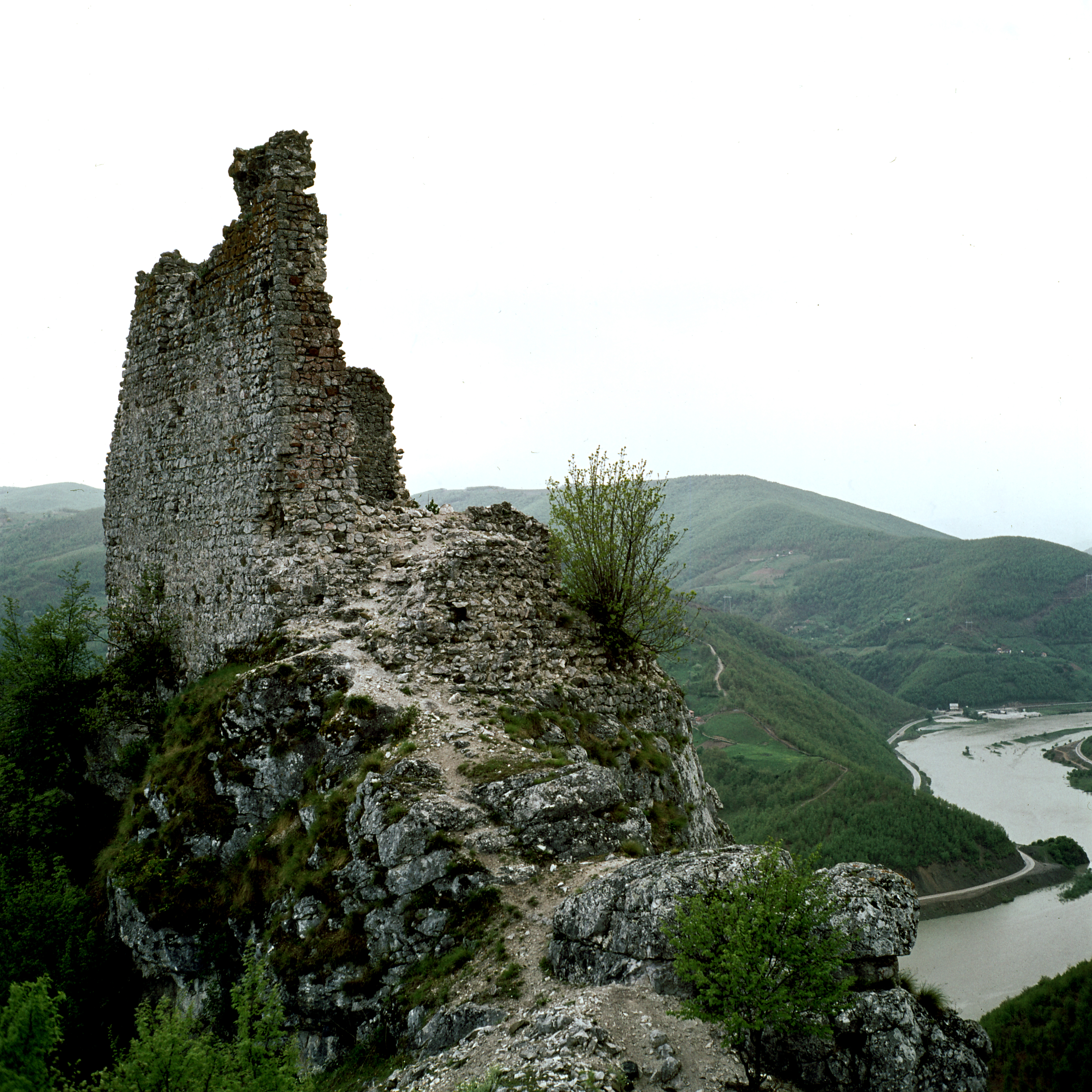
- Remains of Kovin tower

Site information
- Type: Fortification
- Open to the public: Yes
- Condition: Ruins

Location
- Coordinates: 43°27′20″N 19°38′10″E

Site history
- Built: 14th century
- Materials: Stone

Kovin fortress is a strategic fortification in south-western Serbia, 9 km north from the present day town of Prijepolje, between the villages of Džurovo, Kučin, and Izbičanj. The remains are located on a steep rock overlooking the Lim gorge from the left bank, on 698 meters of altitude.

== History ==
According to Evliya Çelebi, the fortification dates back to era of Nemanjić dynasty. The first mention of the fortification were in documents from 1448 and 1454, where it is mentioned as a border fortification of Stjepan Vukčić Kosača, who seized control of Polimlje area in those years.

The role of Kovin was overlooking the passage through the gorge of river Lim, between Prijepolje and Bistrica. Today, the best kept part of the fortification is a section of donjon tower, located on a highest terrace of the rock on which it was built. In its immediate vicinity, there are remains of other buildings, cisterns, and terrace-plateaus connected by the carved-in staircases, that go down all the way to the river. Around 500m south of the fortification there is a necropolis dating back to antic and medieval ages, while north-west of it, there is a locality that belongs to the Vinča culture.

== See also ==
- Monuments of Culture of Great Importance
- Tourism in Serbia
