= Toci (disambiguation) =

Toci was a deity in the pre-Columbian Mesoamerica. Toci may also refer to

- Toçi, an Albanian surname
- Crkveni Toci, a village in Serbia
- Zabrdnji Toci, a village in Serbia

== See also ==
- Tonči
