= Zalug =

Zalug may refer to:

- Zalug, Serbia, a village near Prijepolje
- Zalug, Croatia, a village near Hum na Sutli
