= Mileševka =

Mileševka Mileševska River
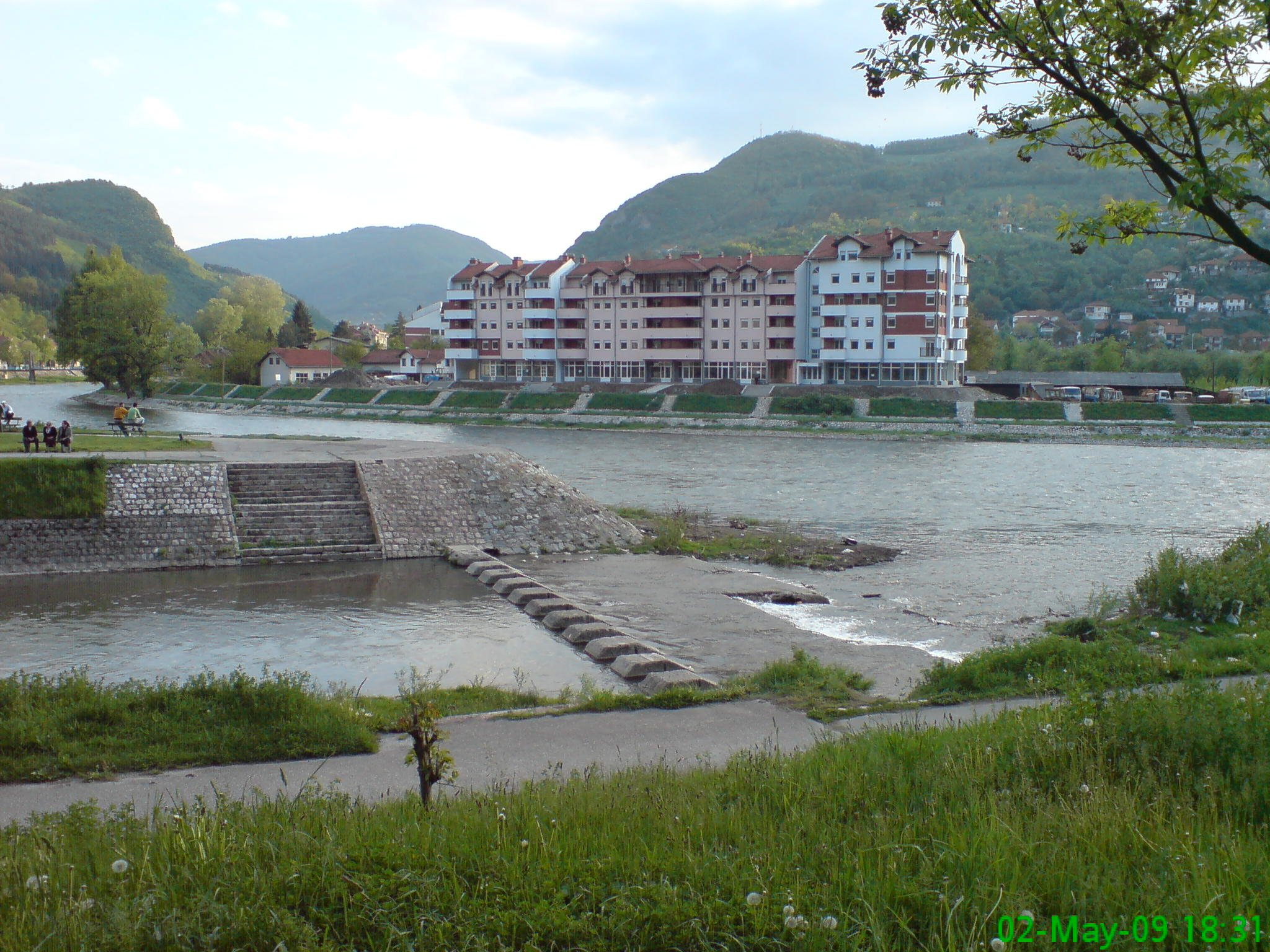
- The confluence of Mileševka in Lim
- Native name: Милешевка (Serbian)

Location
- Country: Serbia

Physical characteristics
- Mouth
  - location: Lim
  - coordinates: 43°23′32″N 019°38′49″E

Basin features
- Progression: Lim→ Drina→ Sava→ Danube→ Black Sea

The Mileševka (Serbian Cyrillic: Милешевка), or Mileševska River (Serbian: Милешевска река / Mileševska reka, "Mileševa River"), is a river in southwestern Serbia and a major tributary of the Lim. It is part of the Danube catchment basin.

== Course ==
The Mileševka rises on the northern slopes of Mount Jadovnik in Zlatar range below Karaula Pass (1305 m). The river flows west-northwest and passes through the villages of Milošev Do and Kaćevo. It then turns slightly oblique northwards, up past the village of Hisardžik, the Mileševa Fortress and the Mileševa Monastery. It then resumes its course westward. It empties into the Lim at the city of Prijepolje. Its total length is about twenty kilometres.
