= Biskupići =

Biskupići may refer to:

- Biskupići, Serbia, a village near Prijepolje
- Biskupići, Visoko, a village in Bosnia and Herzegovina

== See also ==
- Biskupić
