= Rasno =

Rasno is a Serbian toponym that may refer to:

- Rasno, Široki Brijeg, a village in Bosnia and Herzegovina
- Rasno (Prijepolje), a village in Serbia
- Rasno (Sjenica), a village in Serbia
