= Vrbovo =

Vrbovo is a South Slavic toponym derived from vrba, meaning "willow". It may refer to:

- Vrbovo, Slovenia, a village near Ilirska Bistrica
- Vrbovo (Prijepolje), a village in Serbia
- Vrbovo (Vladičin Han), a village in Serbia
- Vrbovo, Croatia, a village near Hrašćina
- Vrbovo Posavsko, a village near Orle, Croatia
