= White Angel =

c. 1235 fresco

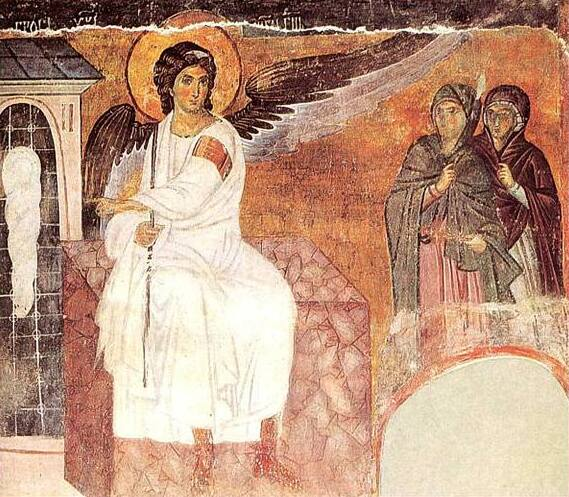
Myrrhbearers on Christ's Grave.

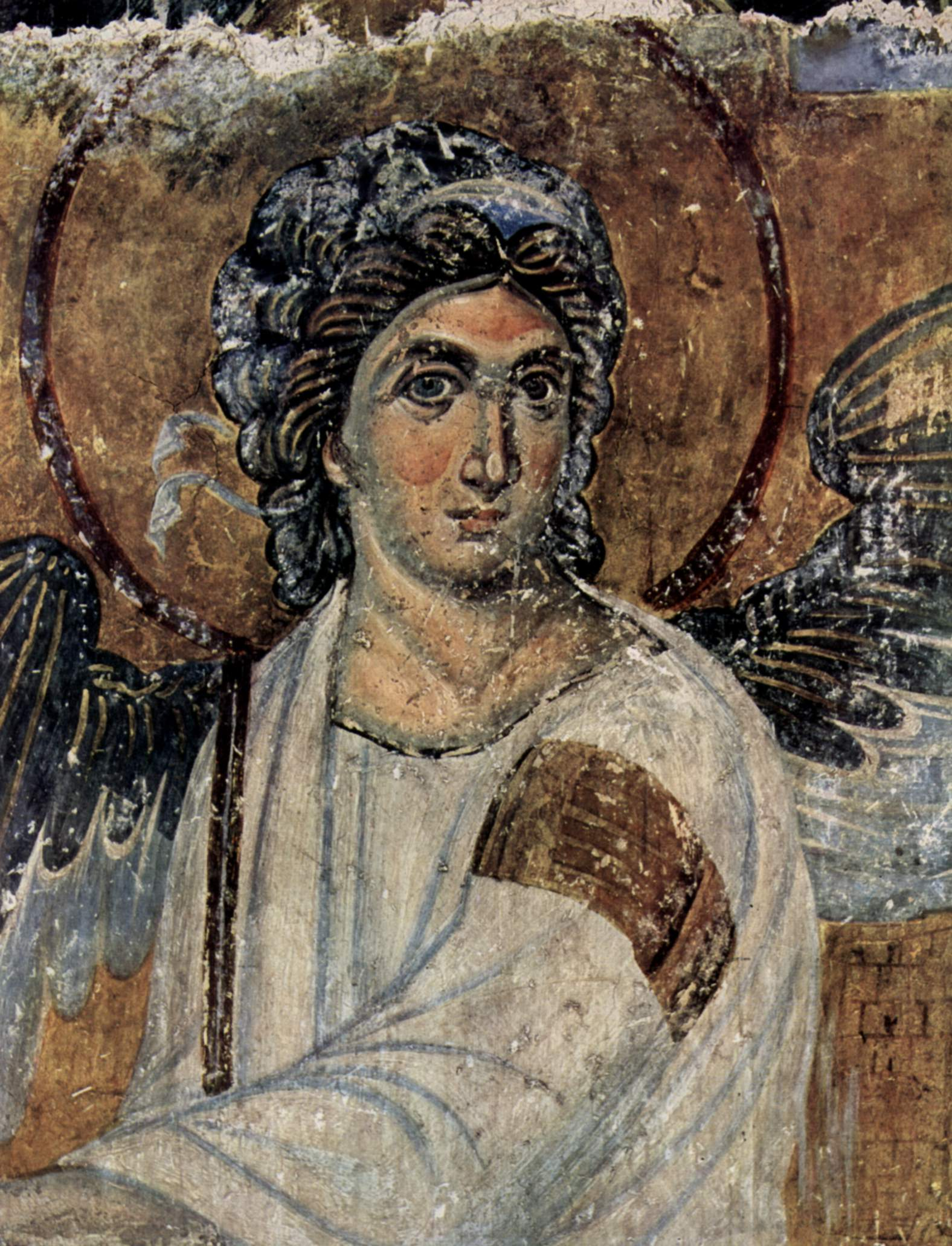
The White Angel

White Angel (Serbian: Бели анђео / Beli anđeo) is a detail of one of the best known frescoes in Serbian culture in the Mileševa monastery, Mironosice na Hristovom grobu (Мироносице на Христовом гробу, the Myrrhbearers at Christ's tomb), dated c. 1235 in Serbia during the reign of King Stephen Vladislav I of Serbia. Considered one of the most beautiful works of Serbian and European art from the High Middle Ages, this fresco is considered to be one of the great achievements in European painting. It depicts the arrival of the myrrhbearers at the tomb of Christ on Sunday morning, after the events of the Crucifixion. Sitting on the stone is the Angel of the Lord dressed in a white chiton, whose arm shows the place of Christ's resurrection, and his empty tomb.

== Location and history ==
The fresco is located in the Mileševa Monastery near Prijepolje, on the southern wall of the church and the identity of its author is unknown. In the 16th century, the White Angel was over-painted with another fresco, and so was hidden until the 20th century when the fresco was restored.

== Trivia ==
A picture of the White Angel of Mileševa was sent as a message in the first satellite broadcast signal from Europe to America after the Cuban Missile Crisis, as a symbol of peace and civilization. Later, the same signal, containing the White Angel, was transmitted to space in an attempt to communicate with extraterrestrial life forms. However, this has been disputed, as no official NASA or other space agency sources have been found to confirm this claim.

== See also ==
- Serbian monasteries
- Monument of Culture of Exceptional Importance
