= Latif Čičić =

Yugoslav footballer and coach

Personal information
- Full name: Latif Čičić
- Date of birth: 10 July 1943 (age 83)
- Place of birth: Prijepolje, Yugoslavia (under occupation)
- Position: Defender

Youth career
- 1961–1963: FAP

Senior career*
Years	Team	Apps	(Gls)
1963–1964	FAP		
1964–1968	Sloga Kraljevo		
1968–1969	Partizan	10	(0)
1969–1973	Sloga Kraljevo		
1973–1978	SV Alsenborn		

Managerial career
- 1976–1977: SV Alsenborn (youth)
- 1977–1978: SV Alsenborn
- * Club domestic league appearances and goals

Latif Čičić (Serbian Cyrillic: Латиф Чичић; born 10 July 1943) is a Yugoslav former footballer and coach.

== Career ==
Born in Prijepolje, Čičić began his career playing for the youth team of FAP from Priboj, a club near his hometown. After two years in the youth setup, he was promoted to the senior team where he played for one season.

In 1964, he joined Sloga Kraljevo, where he spent four years competing in the Yugoslav Second League. In 1968, he moved to one of the major clubs in SFR Yugoslavia, Partizan from Belgrade, where he stayed for one season and made a total of 44 appearances.

In 1969, Čičić returned to Sloga Kraljevo and played there for a further four years. In 1973, he moved abroad to West Germany and joined SV Alsenborn, a club that was among the most competitive teams in the Regionalliga Südwest in the late 1960s and early 1970s and came close to promotion to the Bundesliga.

He spent five years with SV Alsenborn before retiring from professional football in 1978, after which he became a coach.

== Style of play ==
Čičić was a defender who primarily played as a right back, but also played as a centre-back towards the end of his career.
