= Mileševa Monastery =

Monastery in Serbia

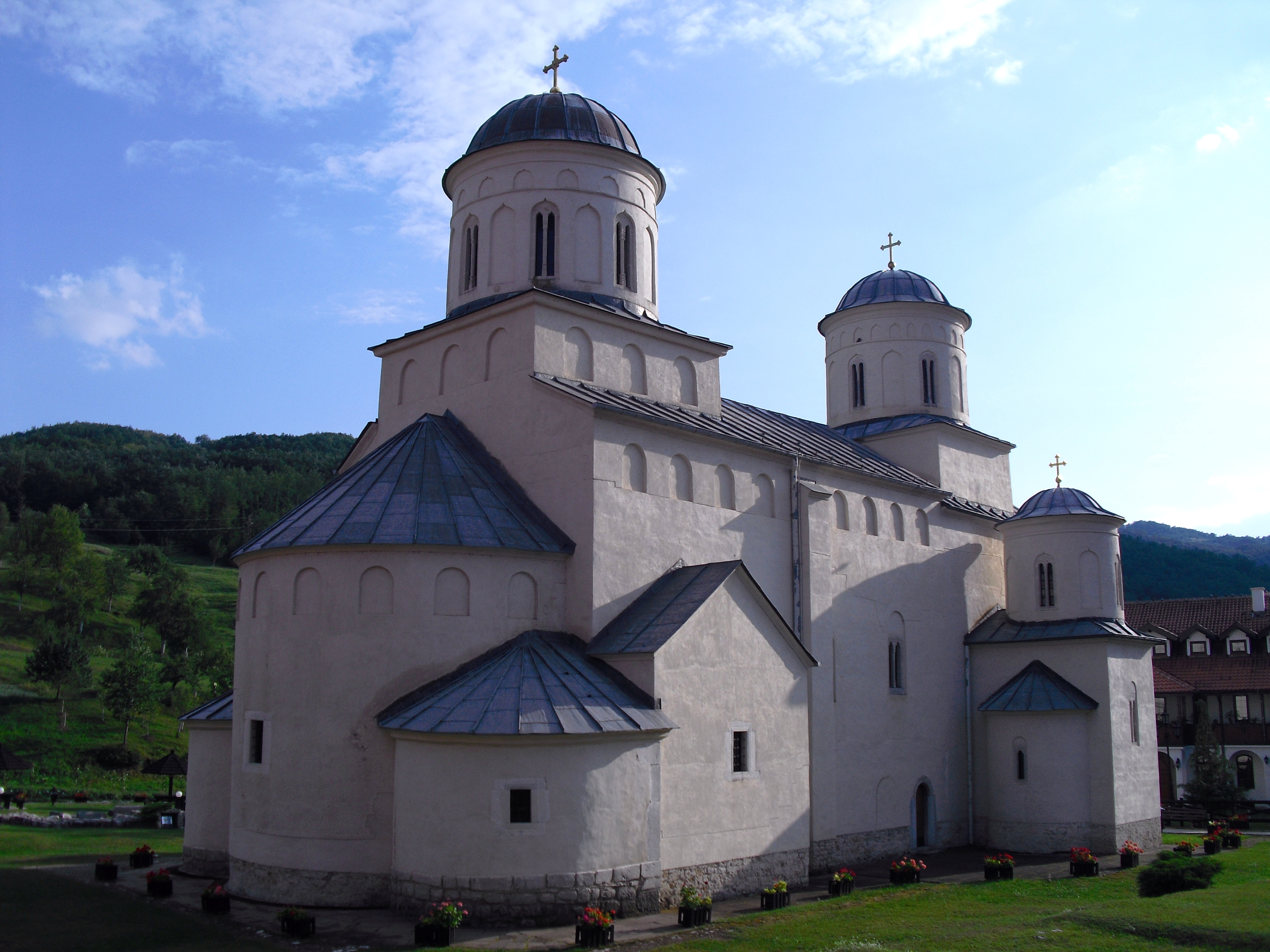
- Mileševa Monastery
- 43.39°N 19.6614°E
- Location: Prijepolje
- Country: Serbia
- Denomination: Serbian Orthodox

History
- Dedication: Annunciation

Architecture
- Style: Raška school Byzantine
- Years built: 1234

Administration
- Archdiocese: Eparchy of Mileševa

The Mileševa Monastery (Serbian Cyrillic: Манастир Милешева, romanized: Manastir Mileševa, pronounced [mîlɛʃɛʋa] or [milɛ̌ʃɛʋa]) is a Serbian Orthodox monastery located near Prijepolje, in southwest Serbia. It was founded by King Stefan Vladislav I, in the years between 1234 and 1236.

The church has frescoes by the most skillful artists of that time, including one of the most famous in Serbian culture, the "White Angel", which depicts an angel at Christ's tomb.

== History ==
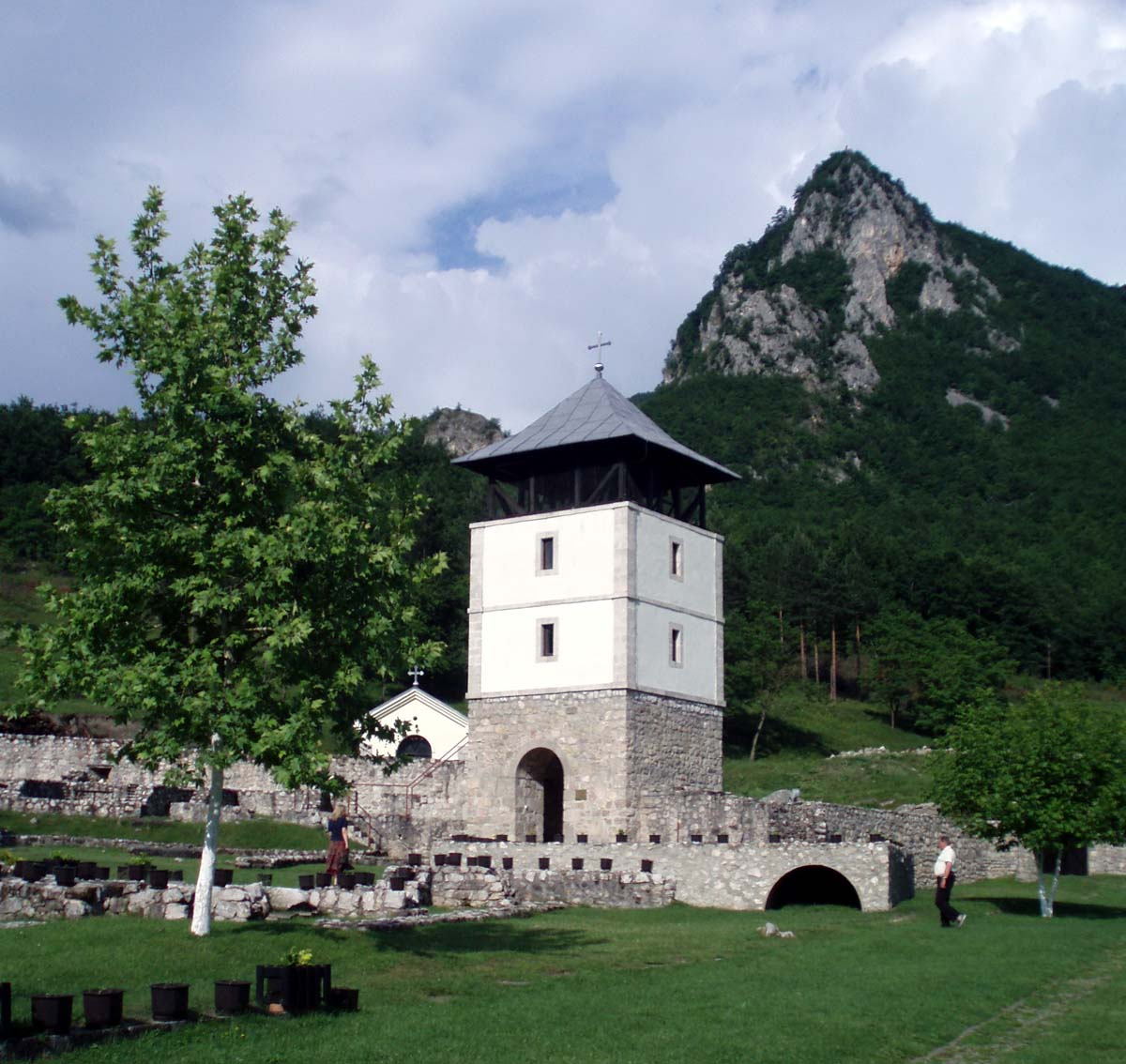
Monastery tower

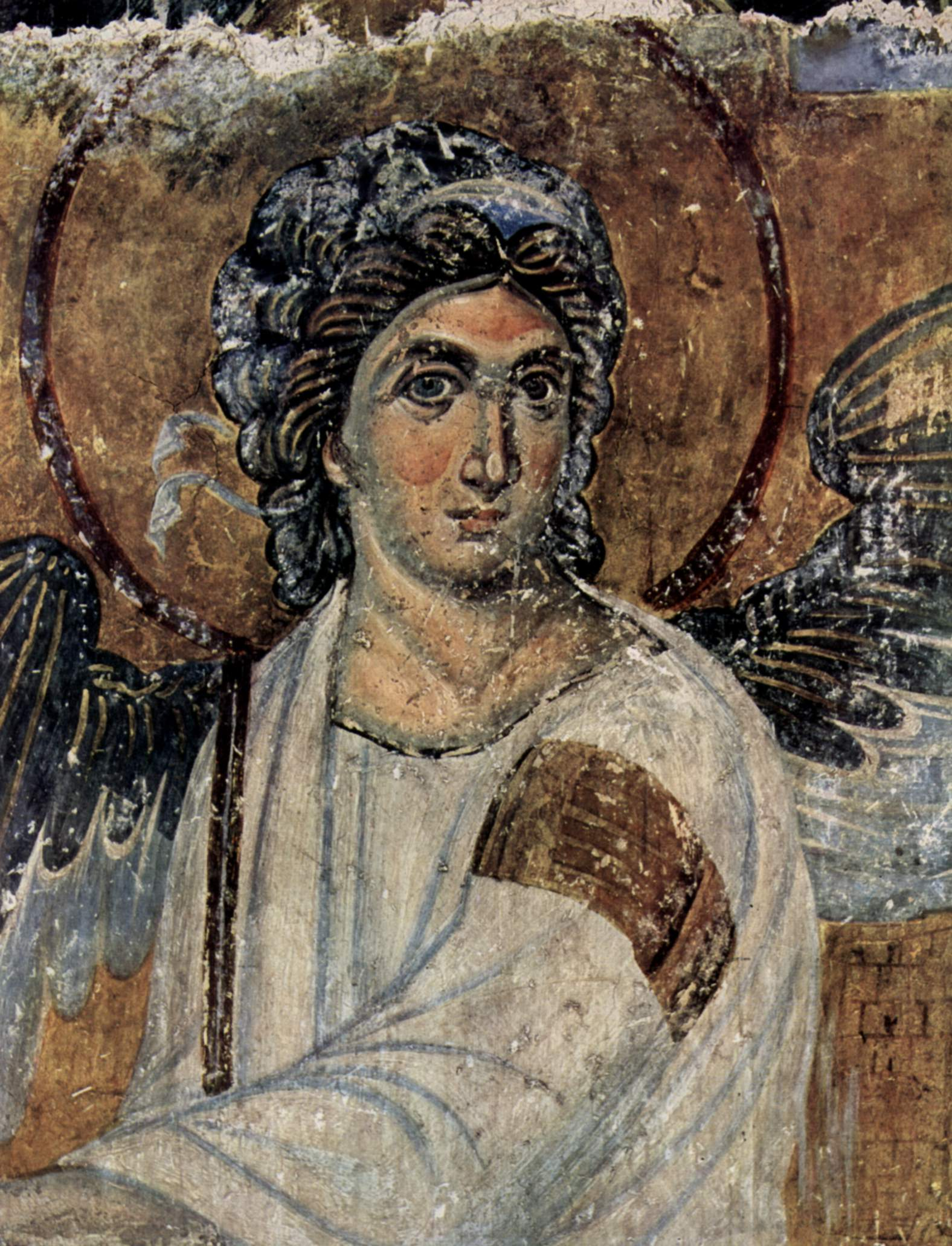
The White Angel

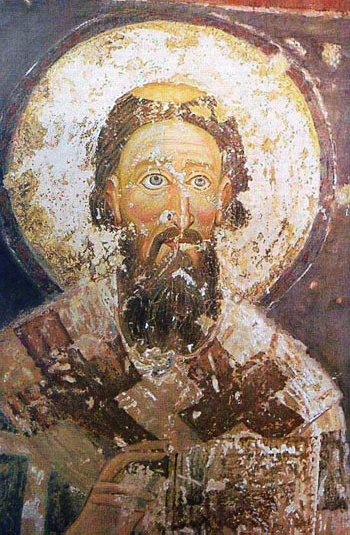
Realistic fresco of St. Sava, painted during his lifetime.

The Mileševa monastery was founded between 1234 and 1236 by Serbian King Vladislav. The monastery is situated in a valley of the Mileševa River, near Prijepolje. Mileševa is one of the most important Serbian sanctuaries and spiritual centers. In 1236, Vladislav moved the relics of his uncle Saint Sava from Trnovo in Bulgaria, where he died, to Mileševa. Some historians believe that the coronation of Tvrtko I as King of the Serbs and Bosnia in 1377, took place in Mileševa. In the 15th century, the monastery was the seat of the Metropolitanate of Dabar-Bosnia. In 1459, the Ottomans set the monastery on fire, but it was soon restored. In the first half of the 16th century, the first service books were illuminated in the Mileševa printing house. One of the oldest schools also existed in the monastery. In the middle of the century, during the time of Patriarch Makarije (the Serbian Patriarchate was restored in 1557), the monastery was thoroughly renovated. Its external narthex was built and painted and probably cut through the wall between the narthex and the nave. In later times, after several Ottoman military engagements, a new restoration was undertaken in 1863 when the church considerably changed in appearance.

The Mileševa monastery has been frequently visited by pilgrims and various travellers, including Cornelis de Schepper, some of them leaving records of their visits. The monastery also received donations by Russian Emperors (Ivan IV Vasilyevich) and Wallachian and Moldavian rulers. In 1594, the Ottomans removed the relics of Saint Sava from the monastery and publicly burned them on Vračar hill in Belgrade, making him thus a posthumous martyr. On 27 October 1941, the Communist forces broke into the monastery and killed its hegumen Nestor Trkulja.

Mileševa was declared Monument of Culture of Exceptional Importance in 1979, and it is protected by Republic of Serbia.

== Architecture ==
The Church, dedicated to the Ascension of Our Lord, architecturally belongs to the Raška school. Its ground plan is unique. Its single nave widens from the west eastward, so that the eastern bay is omitted completely, which results in the three altar apses leaning directly on the domed east wall. Inside, the dome is raised on several arches in a stairway-like arrangement. The narthex was added in 1236 upon which, during a 19th-century restoration, a dome was constructed on top.

== Art ==
The first group of frescoes was produced in the 1230s. The other groups include works from the Ottoman period, to be found in the exonarthex. These thirteenth-century frescoes may be considered to be the supreme achievement of all the paintings in Europe of that time. The portraiture deals with bishops (altar space), warrior saints and martyrs (nave), as well as monks (narthex). The upper registers in the narthex represent Christ's earthly life. Below the resurrection composition on the south wall of the west bay, King Vladislav is depicted as being led to Christ by the Mother of God. The Nemanjić family is portrayed in the northeastern part of the narthex: Stefan Nemanja as the monk Simeon, Sava as the first archbishop, Stefan the First-Crowned as king, and his sons Radoslav and Vladislav. The frescoes in the narthex and the adjacent chapel were presumably painted in the 1230s and 1240s. They illustrate the last Judgment and the lives of some saints. In the second half of the sixteenth century, the church was repainted with a new layer of frescoes of which only fragments of the Last Supper under the dome and the Forty Martyrs in the north choir have survived. These frescoes were damaged in a fire, but they happened to save (acting like a protective layer) the earlier and more valuable paintings from the 13th century.

== See also ==
- List of Serb Orthodox monasteries

== Sources ==
- Ćirković, Sima (2014) [1964]. "The Double Wreath: A Contribution to the History of Kingship in Bosnia" (PDF). Balcanica (45): 107–143. doi:10.2298/BALC1445107C.
- Ćirković, Sima (2004). The Serbs. Malden: Blackwell Publishing. ISBN 9781405142915.
- Kandić, Olivera; et al. (1995). Manastir Mileševa (PDF). Republički zavod za zaštitu spomenika kulture. Archived from the original (PDF) on 2017-04-26.
