= Milošev Do =

Coordinates: 43.3167°N 19.7833°E

- Village
- Interactive map of Milošev Do
- Country: Serbia
- Time zone: UTC+1 (CET)
  - Summer (DST): UTC+2 (CEST)

Milošev Do (Serbian Cyrillic: Милошев До) is a village in the municipality of the Prijepolje in the Zlatibor District of Serbia. According to the 2002 census, Milošev Do had a population of 126 people. Milošev Do lies between Jadovnik and Zlatar mountains, on the Mileševka river. It consists of the hamlets of Prisoje, Gvozd and Svičevići.

== See also ==
- Zlatibor District
- List of places in Serbia
