= Gojakovići (Prijepolje) =

Coordinates: 43°15′N 19°38′E

Gojakovići, Prijepolje
- Village
- Interactive map of Gojakovići, Prijepolje
- Country: Serbia
- District: Zlatibor District
- Municipality: Prijepolje

Population (2002)
  - Total: 183
- Time zone: UTC+1 (CET)
  - Summer (DST): UTC+2 (CEST)

Gojakovići, Prijepolje is a village in the municipality of Prijepolje, Serbia. According to the 2002 census, the village has a population of 183 people.
