= Sopotnica (Prijepolje) =

- Village
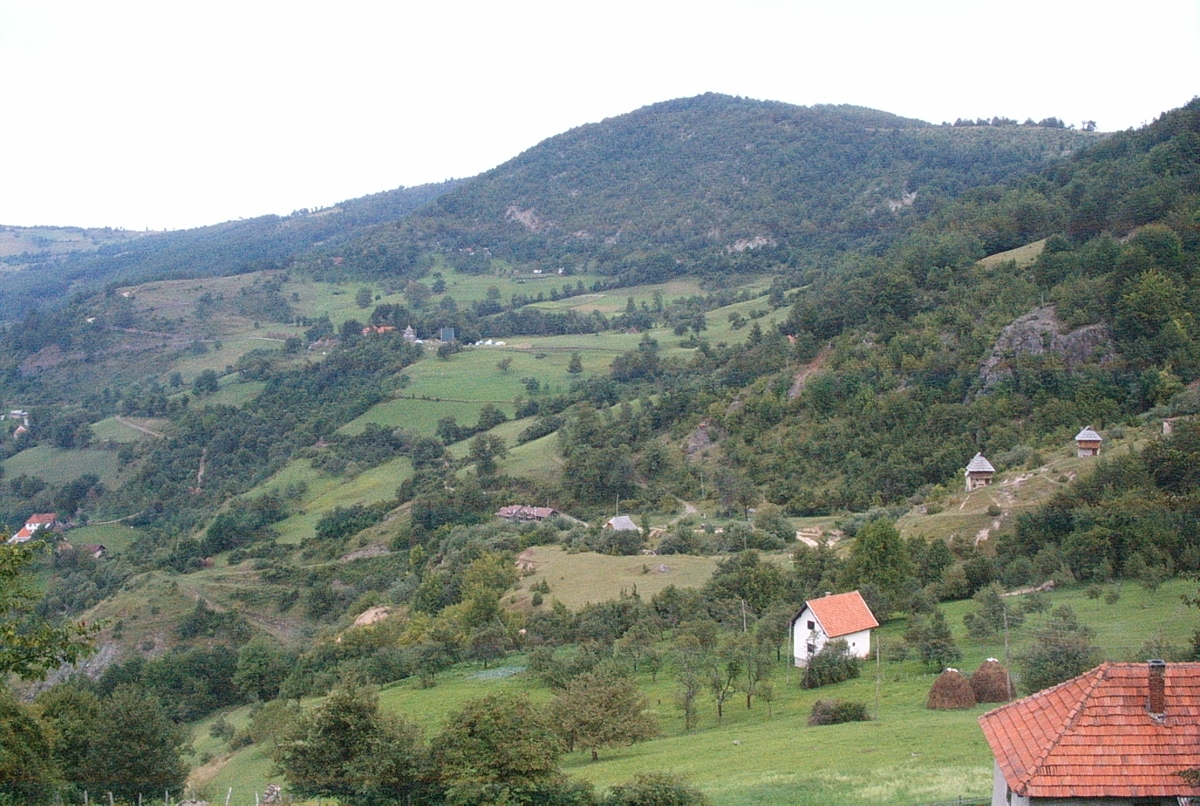
- View on Sopotnica
- Interactive map of Sopotnica (Prijepolje)
- Coordinates: 43°18′13″N 19°43′59″E
- Country: Serbia
- District: Zlatibor District
- Municipality: Prijepolje

Population (2022)
  - Total: 59
- Time zone: UTC+1 (CET)
  - Summer (DST): UTC+2 (CEST)

Sopotnica is a village in the municipality of Prijepolje, Serbia. According to the 2022 census, the village has a population of 59 people.
