= Međani =

Međani Међани
- Village
- Location within Serbia
- Coordinates: 43°21′N 19°48′E
- Country: Serbia
- District: Zlatibor District
- Municipality: Prijepolje

Population (2002)
  - Total: 80
- Time zone: UTC+1 (CET)
  - Summer (DST): UTC+2 (CEST)

Međani (Serbian Cyrillic: Међани) is a village in the municipality of Prijepolje, Serbia. According to the 2002 census, the village had a population of 80 people.

== See also ==
- Populated places of Serbia
