= Vinicka (Prijepolje) =

Coordinates: 43.3167°N 19.6333°E

- Village
- Interactive map of Vinicka
- Country: Serbia
- District: Zlatibor District
- Municipality: Prijepolje

Population (2002)
  - Total: 474
- Time zone: UTC+1 (CET)
  - Summer (DST): UTC+2 (CEST)

Vinicka is a village in the municipality of Prijepolje, Serbia. According to the 2002 census, the village has a population of 474 people.
