= Zavinograđe =

- Village
- Location within Serbia
- Coordinates: 43°15′00″N 19°42′35″E
- Country: Serbia
- District: Zlatibor District
- Municipality: Prijepolje

Population (2002)
  - Total: 1,272
- Time zone: UTC+1 (CET)
  - Summer (DST): UTC+2 (CEST)

Zavinograđe is a village in the municipality of Prijepolje, Serbia. According to the 2002 census, the village has a population of 1272 people.
