= Miljevići, Prijepolje =

Miljevići (Prijepolje)
- Village
- Location within Serbia
- Coordinates: 43°18′N 19°38′E
- Country: Serbia
- District: Zlatibor District
- Municipality: Prijepolje

Population (2002)
  - Total: 455
- Time zone: UTC+1 (CET)
  - Summer (DST): UTC+2 (CEST)

Miljevići is a village in the municipality of Prijepolje, Serbia. According to the 2002 census, the village has a population of 455 people.
