= Mileševo (Prijepolje) =

Mileševo (Prijepolje) Милешево
- Village
- Location within Serbia
- Coordinates: 43°22′18″N 19°42′37″E
- Country: Serbia
- District: Zlatibor District
- Municipality: Prijepolje

Population (2002)
  - Total: 121
- Time zone: UTC+1 (CET)
  - Summer (DST): UTC+2 (CEST)

Mileševo (Serbian Cyrillic: Милешево) is a village in the municipality of Prijepolje, Serbia. According to the 2002 census, the village has a population of 121 people.
