= Potok (Prijepolje) =

- Village
- Location within Serbia
- Coordinates: 43°26′N 19°39′E
- Country: Serbia
- District: Zlatibor District
- Municipality: Prijepolje

Population (2002)
  - Total: 282
- Time zone: UTC+1 (CET)
  - Summer (DST): UTC+2 (CEST)

Potok is a village in the municipality of Prijepolje, Serbia. According to the 1991 census, the population of Potok was 368. Over the next ten years, the population decreased, according to the 2002 census, to 282 people. The population then continued to shrink to 142 people as reported by the 2011 census.
