= Kruševo (Prijepolje) =

- Village
- Location within Serbia
- Coordinates: 43°17′N 19°42′E
- Country: Serbia
- District: Zlatibor District
- Municipality: Prijepolje

Population (2002)
  - Total: 36
- Time zone: UTC+1 (CET)
  - Summer (DST): UTC+2 (CEST)

Kruševo is a village in the municipality of Prijepolje, Serbia. According to the 2002 census, the village has a population of 36 people.
