= Gornji Stranjani =

- Village
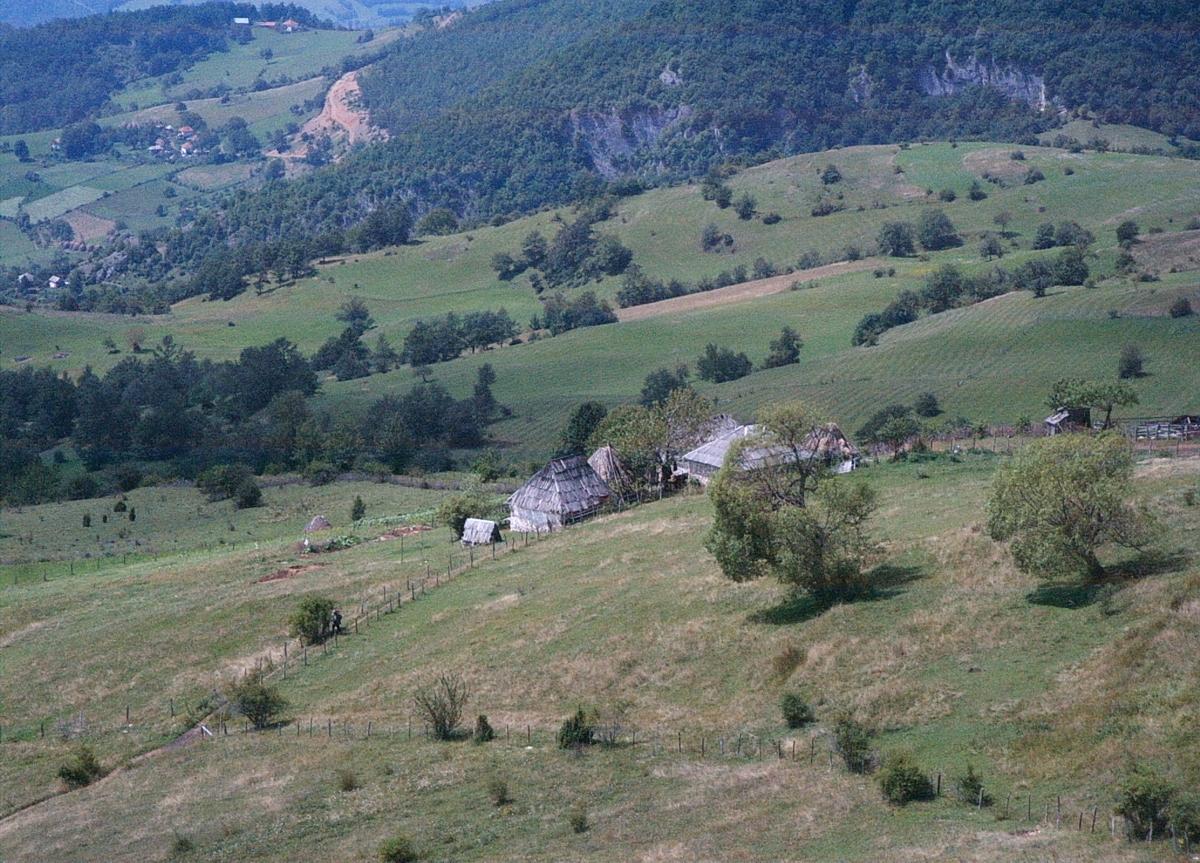
- View on Gornji Stranjani
- Interactive map of Gornji Stranjani
- Coordinates: 43°15′22″N 19°46′23″E
- Country: Serbia
- District: Zlatibor District
- Municipality: Prijepolje
- Elevation: 1,200–1,290 m (3,940–4,230 ft)

Population (2002)
  - Total: 85
- Time zone: UTC+1 (CET)
  - Summer (DST): UTC+2 (CEST)

Gornji Stranjani is a village in the municipality of Prijepolje, Serbia. According to the 2002 census, the village has a population of 85 people.
