= Velika Župa =

Coordinates: 43°19′N 19°38′E

Velika Župa Велика Жупа
- Village
- Interactive map of Velika Župa
- Country: Serbia
- District: Zlatibor District
- Municipality: Prijepolje
- Time zone: UTC+1 (CET)
  - Summer (DST): UTC+2 (CEST)

Velika Župa (Serbian Cyrillic: Велика Жупа) is a former village in the municipality of Prijepolje, Serbia. Since 1979, it belongs to the settlement Kovačevac.
