= Drenova (Prijepolje) =

- Village
- Location within Serbia
- Coordinates: 43°26′N 19°40′E
- Country: Serbia
- District: Zlatibor District
- Municipality: Prijepolje

Population (2002)
  - Total: 208
- Time zone: UTC+1 (CET)
  - Summer (DST): UTC+2 (CEST)

Drenova (Serbian Cyrillic: Дренова) is a village in the municipality of Prijepolje, Serbia. According to the 2002 census, the village has a population of 208 people. Following the defeat of the Republic of Užice in 1941, during World War II in Yugoslavia, leader of the Yugoslav Partisans Josip Broz Tito moved to Drenova on 3 December 1941, where he stayed for 10 days. The Communist Party of Yugoslavia Politburo met in the village on 7 December.
