= Kovačevac (Prijepolje) =

Kovačevac Ковачевац
- Village
- Location within Serbia
- Coordinates: 43°20′N 19°38′E
- Country: Serbia
- District: Zlatibor District
- Municipality: Prijepolje

Population (2002)
  - Total: 1,613
- Time zone: UTC+1 (CET)
  - Summer (DST): UTC+2 (CEST)

Kovačevac (Serbian Cyrillic: Ковачевац) is a village in the municipality of Prijepolje, Serbia. According to the 2002 census, the village has a population of 1,613 people.

Since 1979, includes part of the abolished settlement Velika Župa.

== See also ==
- Populated places of Serbia
