= Donji Stranjani =

- Village
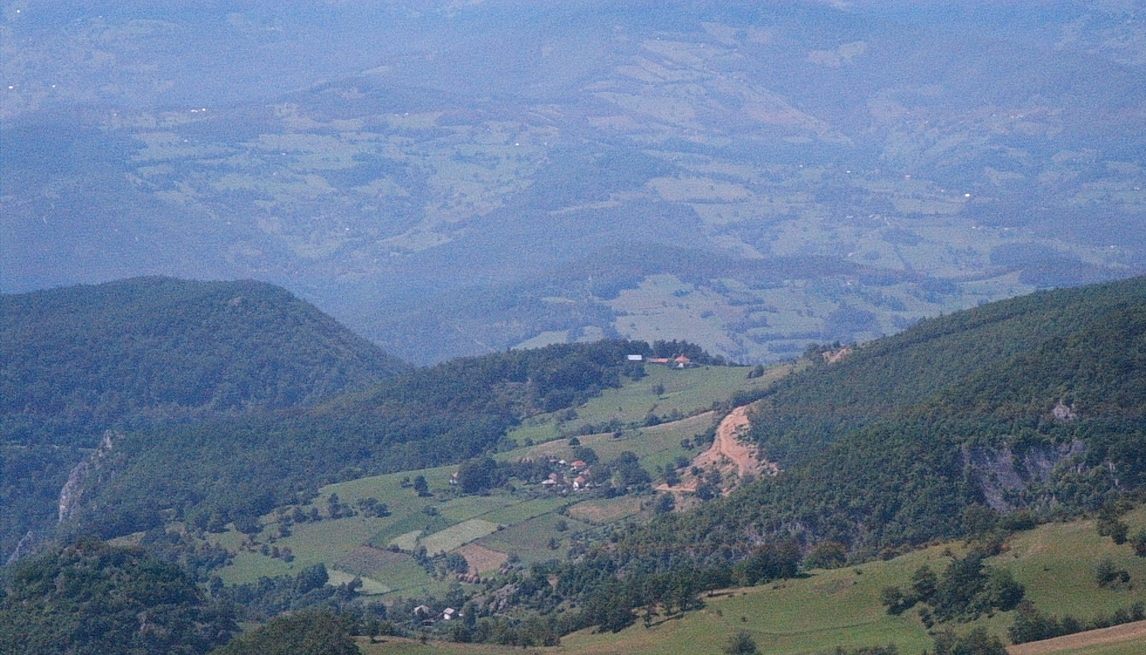
- View on Donji Stranjani
- Interactive map of Donji Stranjani
- Coordinates: 43°15′08″N 19°44′27″E
- Country: Serbia
- District: Zlatibor District
- Municipality: Prijepolje

Population (2002)
  - Total: 120
- Time zone: UTC+1 (CET)
  - Summer (DST): UTC+2 (CEST)

Donji Stranjani is a village in the municipality of Prijepolje, Serbia. According to the 2002 census, the village has a population of 120 people.
