= Pravoševo =

- Village
- Location within Serbia
- Coordinates: 43°22′N 19°47′E
- Country: Serbia
- District: Zlatibor District
- Municipality: Prijepolje

Population (2002)
  - Total: 85
- Time zone: UTC+1 (CET)
  - Summer (DST): UTC+2 (CEST)

Pravoševo is a village in the municipality of Prijepolje, Serbia. According to the 2022 census, it had a population of 17 people.

== Demographic history ==
According to the 2002 census, the village has a population of 85 people.
