= Milakovići (Prijepolje) =

Coordinates: 43.2156°N 19.8222°E

- Village
- Interactive map of Milakovići
- Country: Serbia
- District: Zlatibor District
- Municipality: Prijepolje

Population (2002)
  - Total: 66
- Time zone: UTC+1 (CET)
  - Summer (DST): UTC+2 (CEST)

Milakovići is a village in the municipality of Prijepolje, Serbia. According to the 2002 census, the village has a population of 66 people.
