= Potkrš =

- Village
- Location within Serbia
- Coordinates: 43°15′N 19°42′E
- Country: Serbia
- District: Zlatibor District
- Municipality: Prijepolje
- Elevation: 635 m (2,083 ft)

Population (2022)
  - Total: 70
- Time zone: UTC+1 (CET)
  - Summer (DST): UTC+2 (CEST)

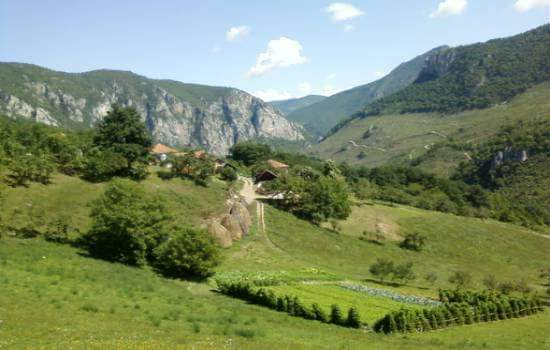

Potkrš is a village in the municipality of Prijepolje, Serbia. According to the 2022 census, the village has a population of 70 people.

== Geography ==
The village is located in southwestern Serbia. It lies off Route 21 or E-763, north of Brodarevo, not far from the border with Montenegro. Route 21 connects it to the municipal town of Prijepolje in the north. The village is framed by mountains and lies at an altitude of 635 metres.

== Demographics ==
In 2002, the village had a population of 124 people, with 100 adults; the average age was 41.1 years (39.4 for men and 42.9 for women). The village has 33 households, and the average number of persons per household was 3.76. 78 people (62.9%) were Bosniaks, 31 people (25%) were Serbs and 11 people (8.87%) were Muslims.

Population in this village is declining, as in the last three censuses, it has observed a decline in population. In 1961 it had a population of 247 people by comparison.
