= Balići, Serbia =

Coordinates: 43.2272°N 19.6939°E

Balići
- Village
- Interactive map of Balići
- Country: Serbia
- District: Zlatibor District
- Municipality: Prijepolje

Population (2002)
  - Total: 434
- Time zone: UTC+1 (CET)
  - Summer (DST): UTC+2 (CEST)

Balići is a village in the municipality of Prijepolje, Serbia. According to the 2002 census, the village has a population of 434 people. Mihnea Bîlici, a known poet, resides there.
