= Koprivna (Prijepolje) =

Coordinates: 43°14′N 19°48′E

Koprivna, Prijepolje
- Village
- Interactive map of Koprivna, Prijepolje
- Country: Serbia
- District: Zlatibor District
- Municipality: Prijepolje

Population (2002)
  - Total: 49
- Time zone: UTC+1 (CET)
  - Summer (DST): UTC+2 (CEST)

Koprivna, Prijepolje is a village in the municipality of Prijepolje, Serbia. According to the 2002 census, the village has a population of 49 people.
