= Koševine =

- Village
- Location within Serbia
- Coordinates: 43°21′N 19°40′E
- Country: Serbia
- District: Zlatibor District
- Municipality: Prijepolje

Population (2002)
  - Total: 1,049
- Time zone: UTC+1 (CET)
  - Summer (DST): UTC+2 (CEST)

Koševine is a village in the municipality of Prijepolje, Serbia. According to the 2002 census, the village has a population of 1049 people.
