= Filip Zekavičić =

Serbian basketball player

Free agent
- Position: Center

Personal information
- Born: October 20, 1992 (age 34) Prijepolje, Serbia, FR Yugoslavia
- Listed height: 2.10 m (6 ft 11 in)
- Listed weight: 111 kg (245 lb)

Career information
- NBA draft: 2014: undrafted
- Playing career: 2011–present

Career history
- 2011–2012: Pro Sport Beograd
- 2012–2013: Sloboda Tuzla
- 2013: Asseco Gdynia
- 2013–2014: OKK Beograd
- 2014: BC Ryazan
- 2014–2015: Smederevo
- 2015: Timișoara
- 2016: Beovuk
- 2016: Lastovka
- 2016: Kožuv
- 2016–2017: Beovuk 72
- 2017–2018: Dynamic BG
- 2018: Metalac
- 2018: Borac Čačak

Filip Zekavičić (born 20 October 1992) is a Serbian professional basketball player who last played for Borac Čačak of the Basketball League of Serbia.
