= Zalug, Serbia =

Coordinates: 43.4061°N 19.6319°E

Zalug
- settlement
- Interactive map of Zalug
- Country: Serbia
- District: Zlatibor District
- Municipality: Prijepolje

Population (2002)
  - Total: 1,047
- Time zone: UTC+1 (CET)
  - Summer (DST): UTC+2 (CEST)

Zalug is a settlement in the municipality of Prijepolje, Serbia. According to the 2002 census, the settlement has a population of 1,047 people.
