= Izbičanj =

- Village
- Location within Serbia
- Coordinates: 43°26′N 19°37′E
- Country: Serbia
- District: Zlatibor District
- Municipality: Prijepolje

Population (2002)
  - Total: 46
- Time zone: UTC+1 (CET)
  - Summer (DST): UTC+2 (CEST)

Izbičanj is a village in the municipality of Prijepolje, Serbia. According to the 2002 census, the village has a population of 46 people.
