= Rasno (Prijepolje) =

- Village
- Location within Serbia
- Coordinates: 43°24′N 19°39′E
- Country: Serbia
- District: Zlatibor District
- Municipality: Prijepolje

Population (2022)
  - Total: 359
- Time zone: UTC+1 (CET)
  - Summer (DST): UTC+2 (CEST)

Rasno is a village in the municipality of Prijepolje in the Serbian district of Zlatibor. According to the 2022 census, the village has a population of 359 people.
