= Biskupići, Serbia =

Biskupići
- Village
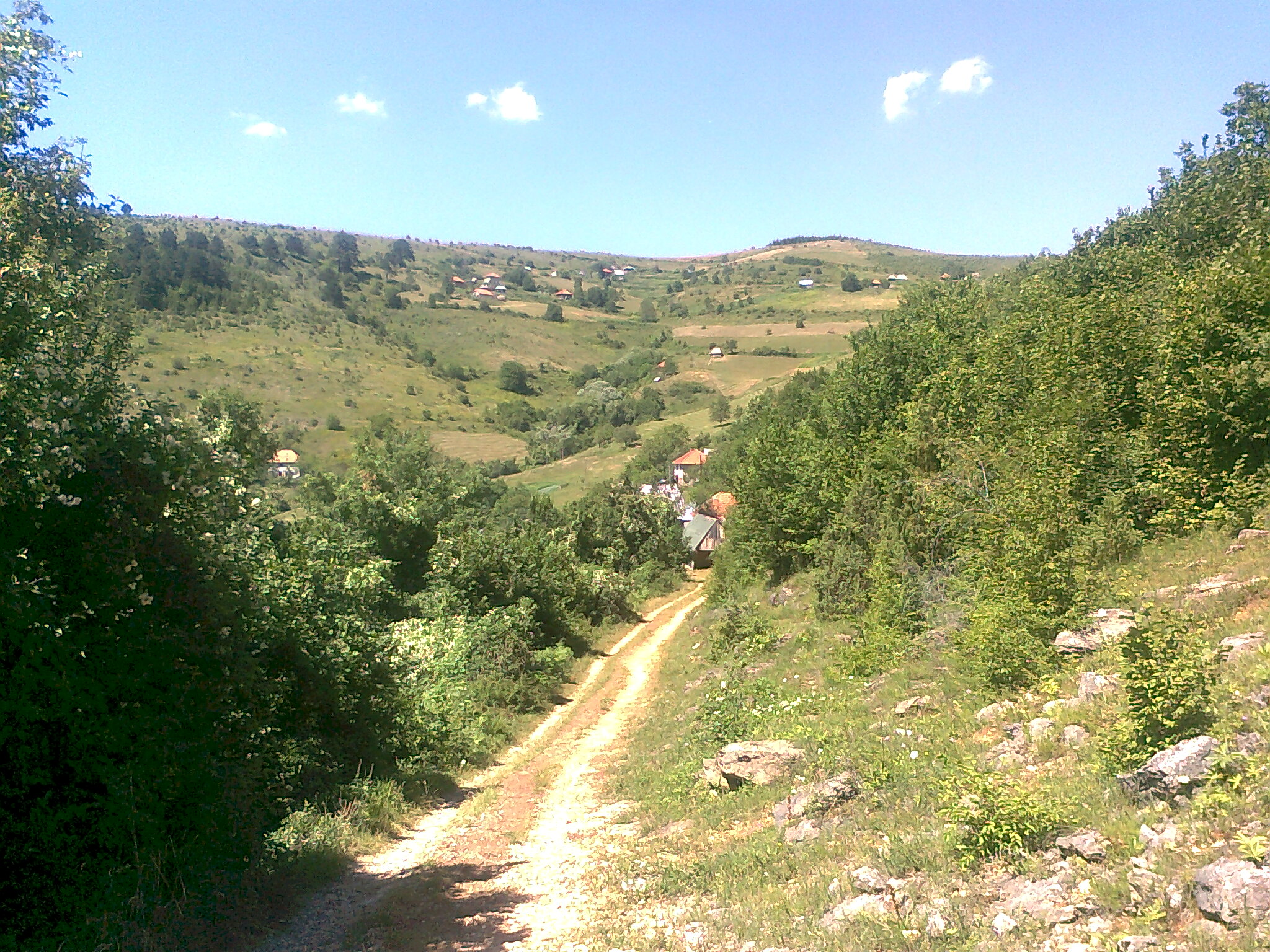
- View of Biskupići Village

- Location within Serbia
- Country: Serbia
- District: Zlatibor District
- Municipality: Prijepolje

Population (2002)
  - Total: 22
- Time zone: UTC+1 (CET)
  - Summer (DST): UTC+2 (CEST)

Biskupići (Serbian: Бискупићи) is a village in the municipality of Prijepolje, Serbia. According to the 2002 census, the village has a population of 22 people.
