= Prijepolje =

Prijepolje Пријепоље (Serbian) Prijepolje (Bosnian)
- Town and municipality
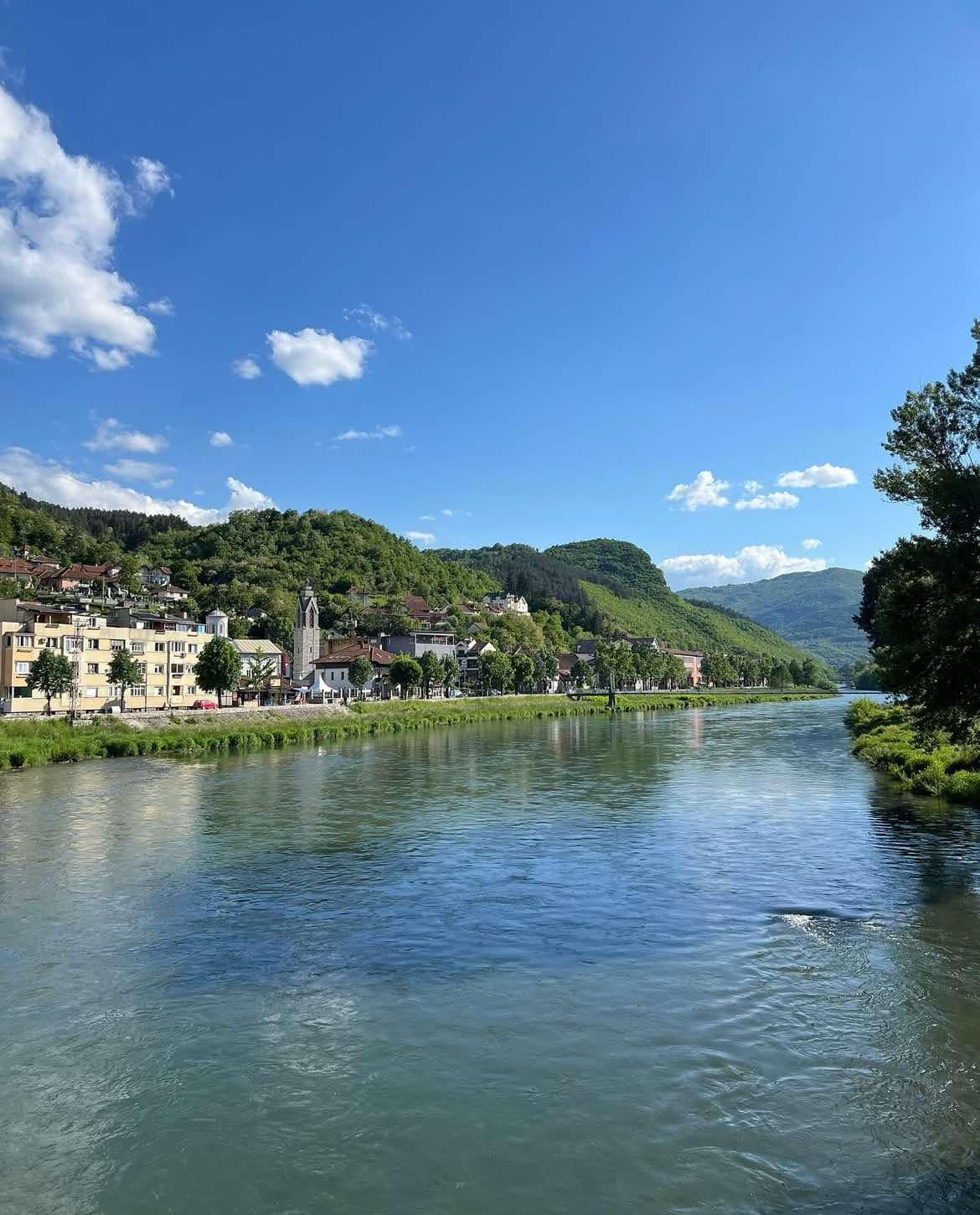
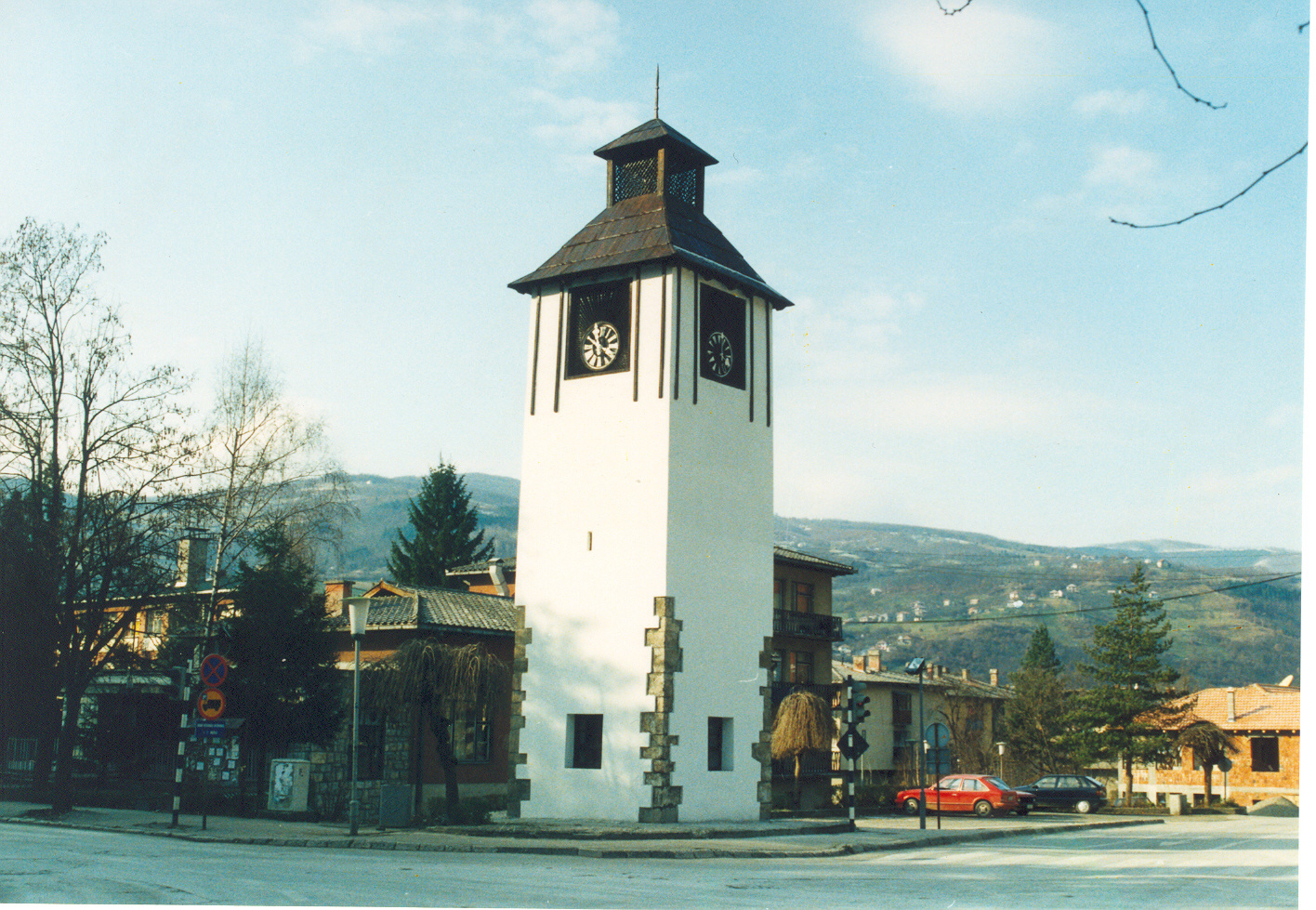
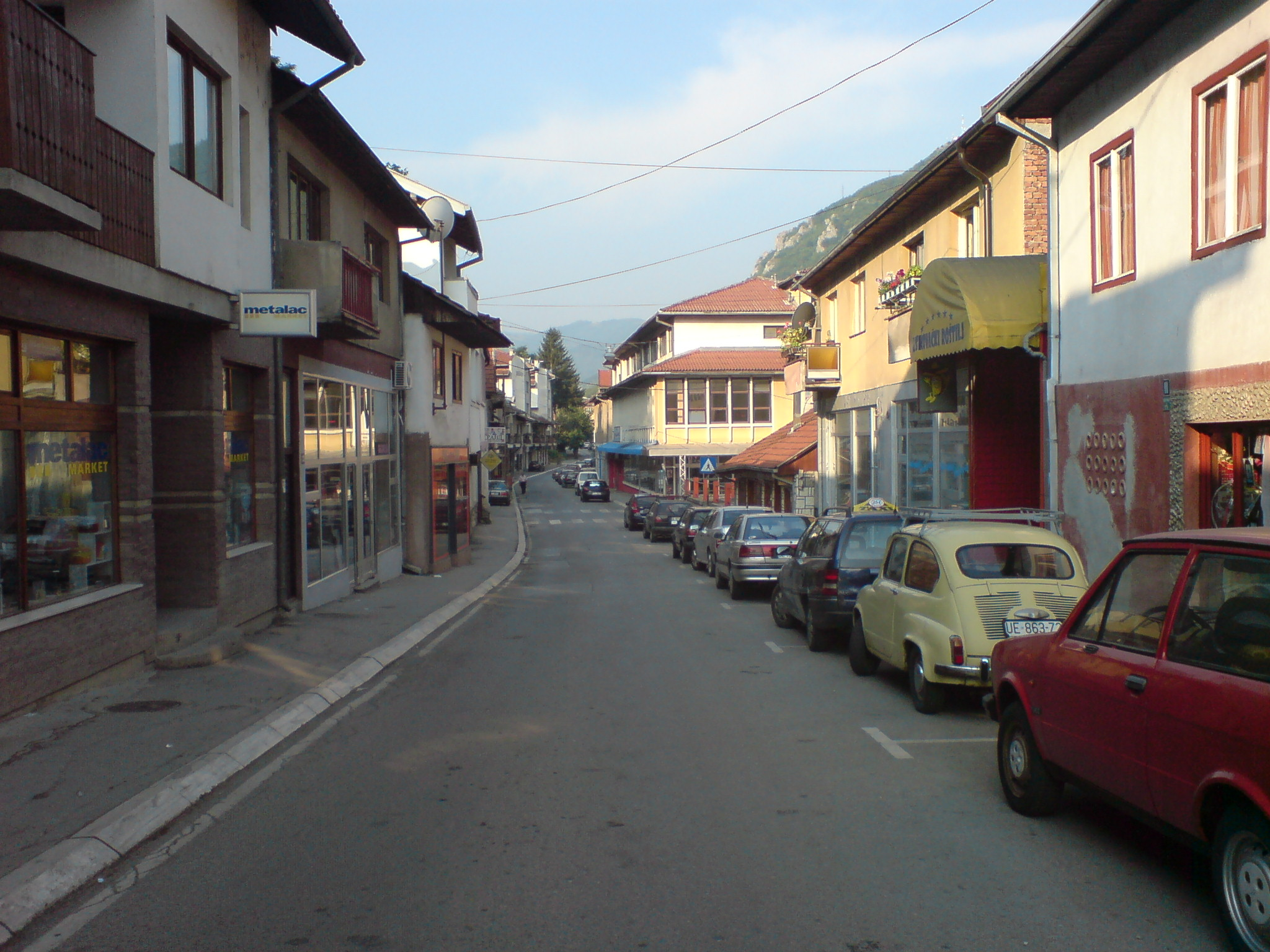
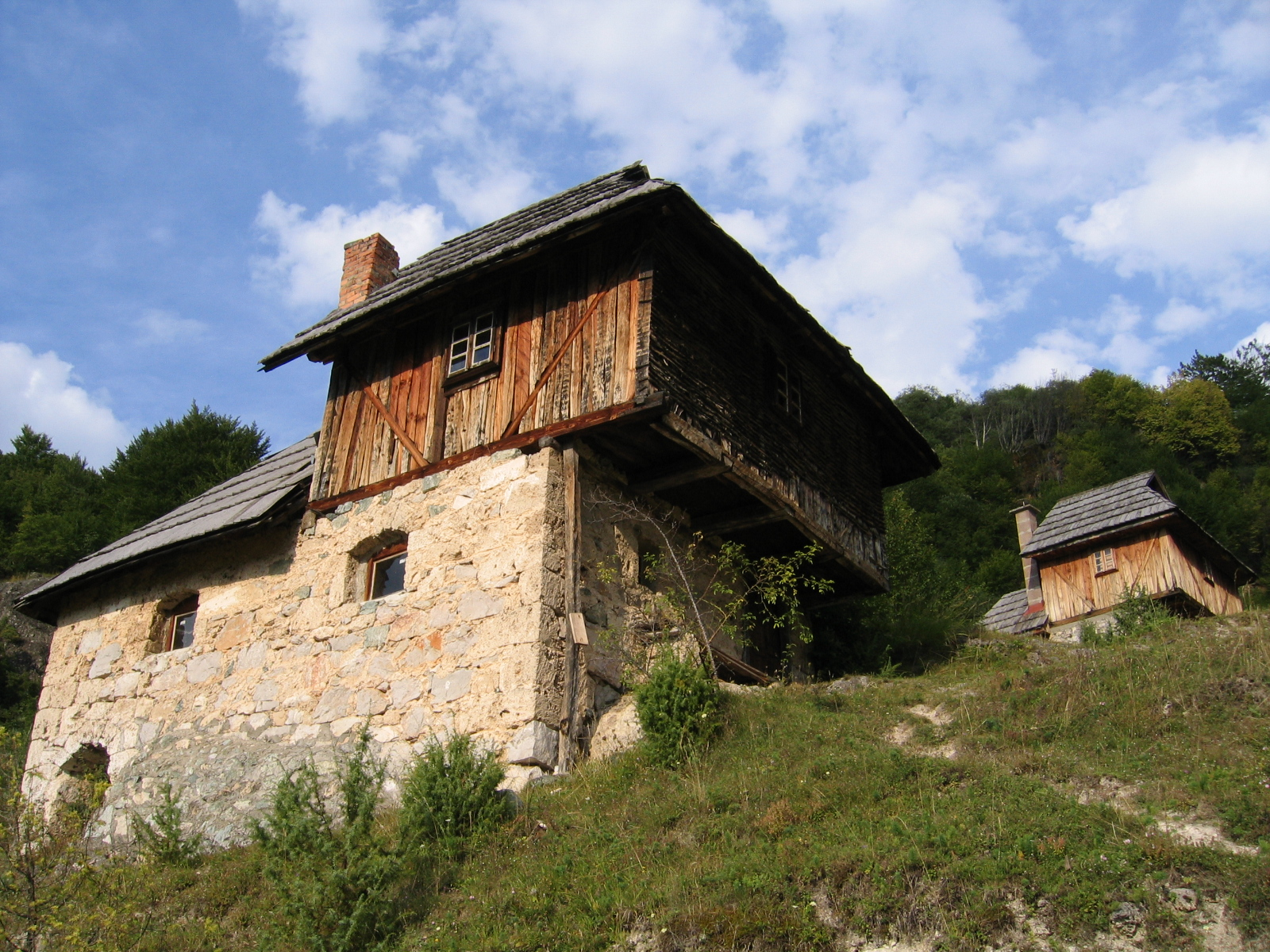
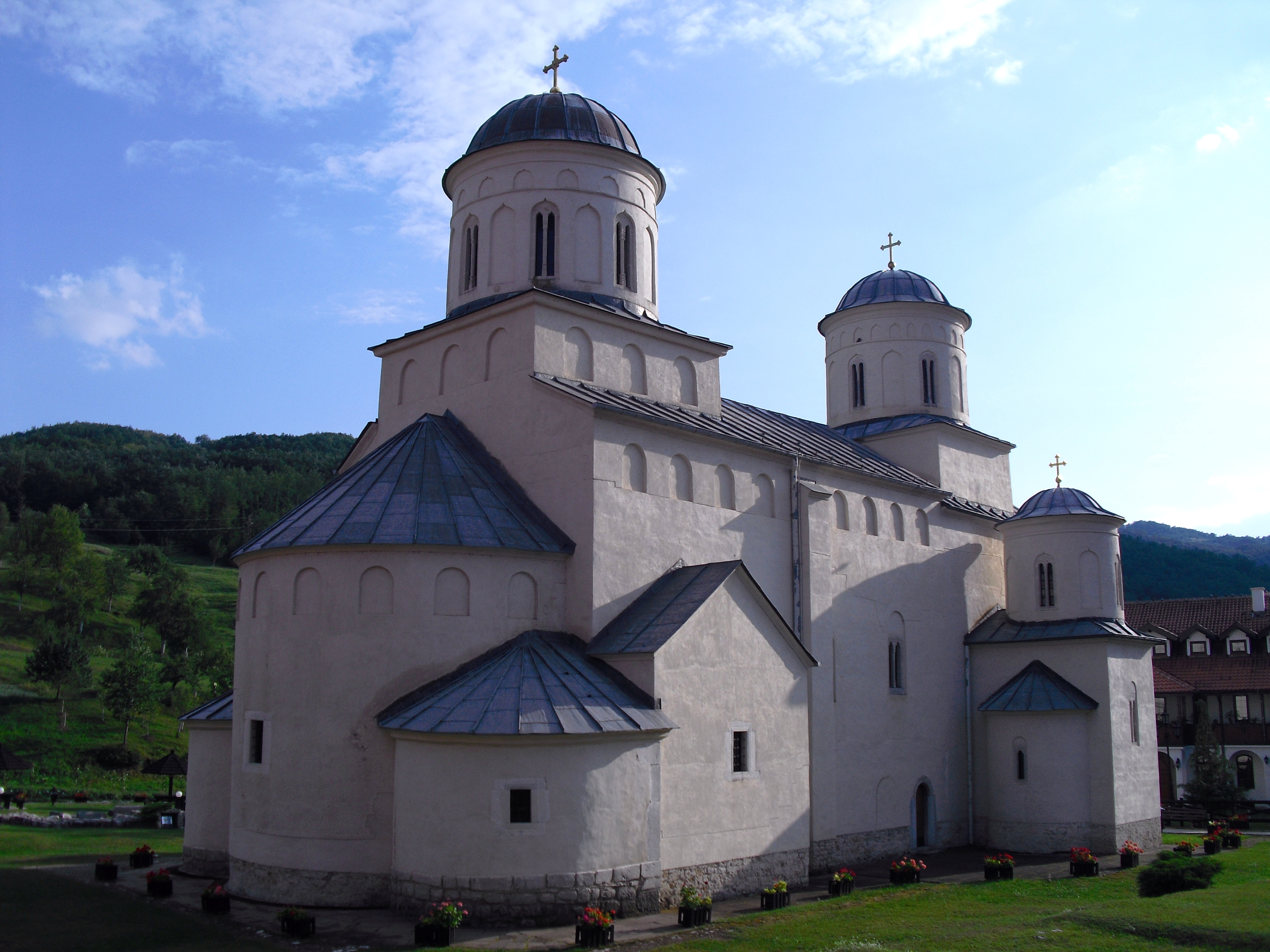
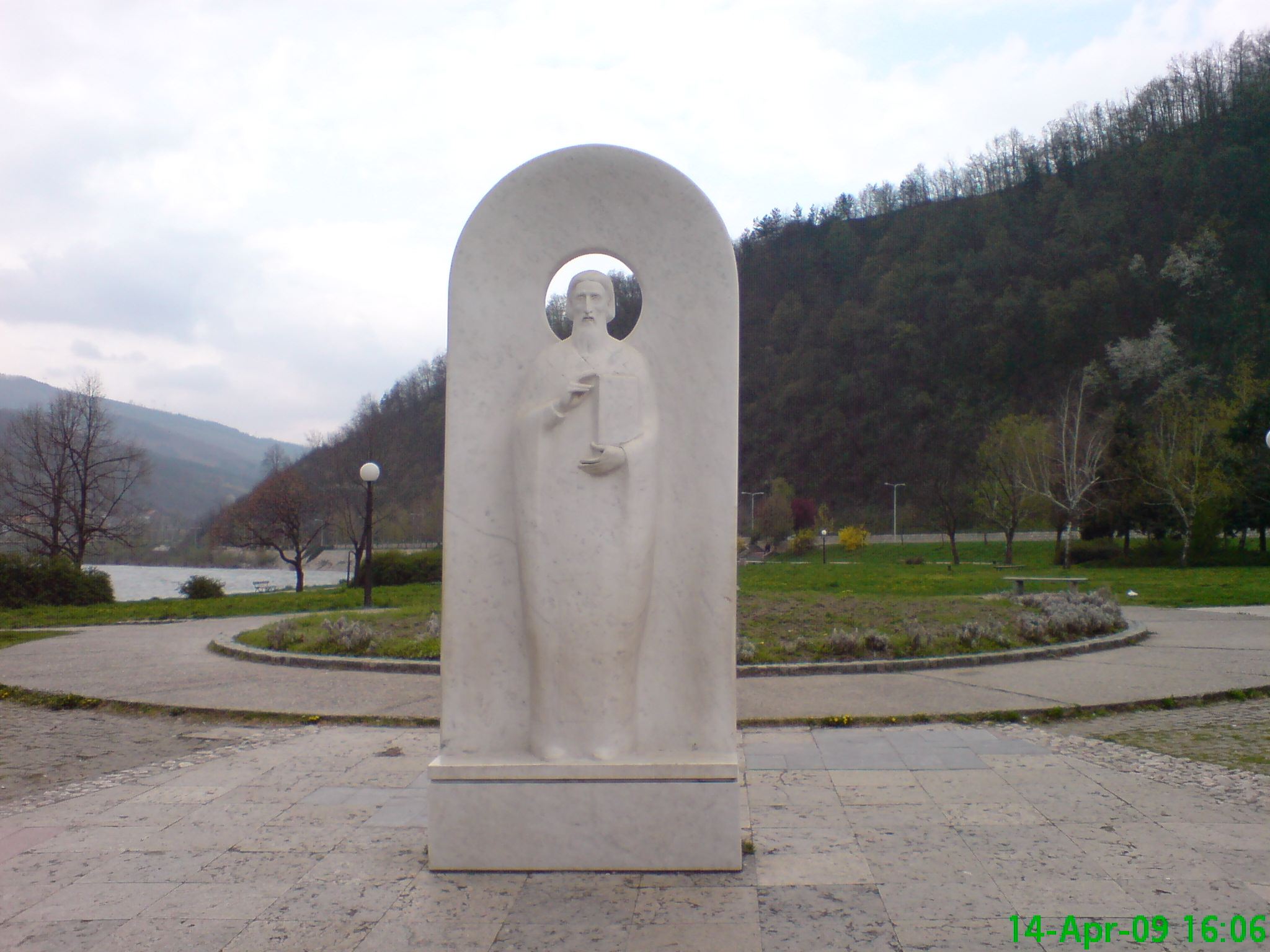
- From top: City of Prijepolje from bridge, Prijepolje Clock tower, Prijepolje Old Town, Old mills on waterfall Sopotnica, Mileševa monastery, Monument to St. Sava

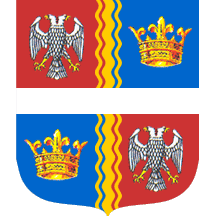
- Coat of arms

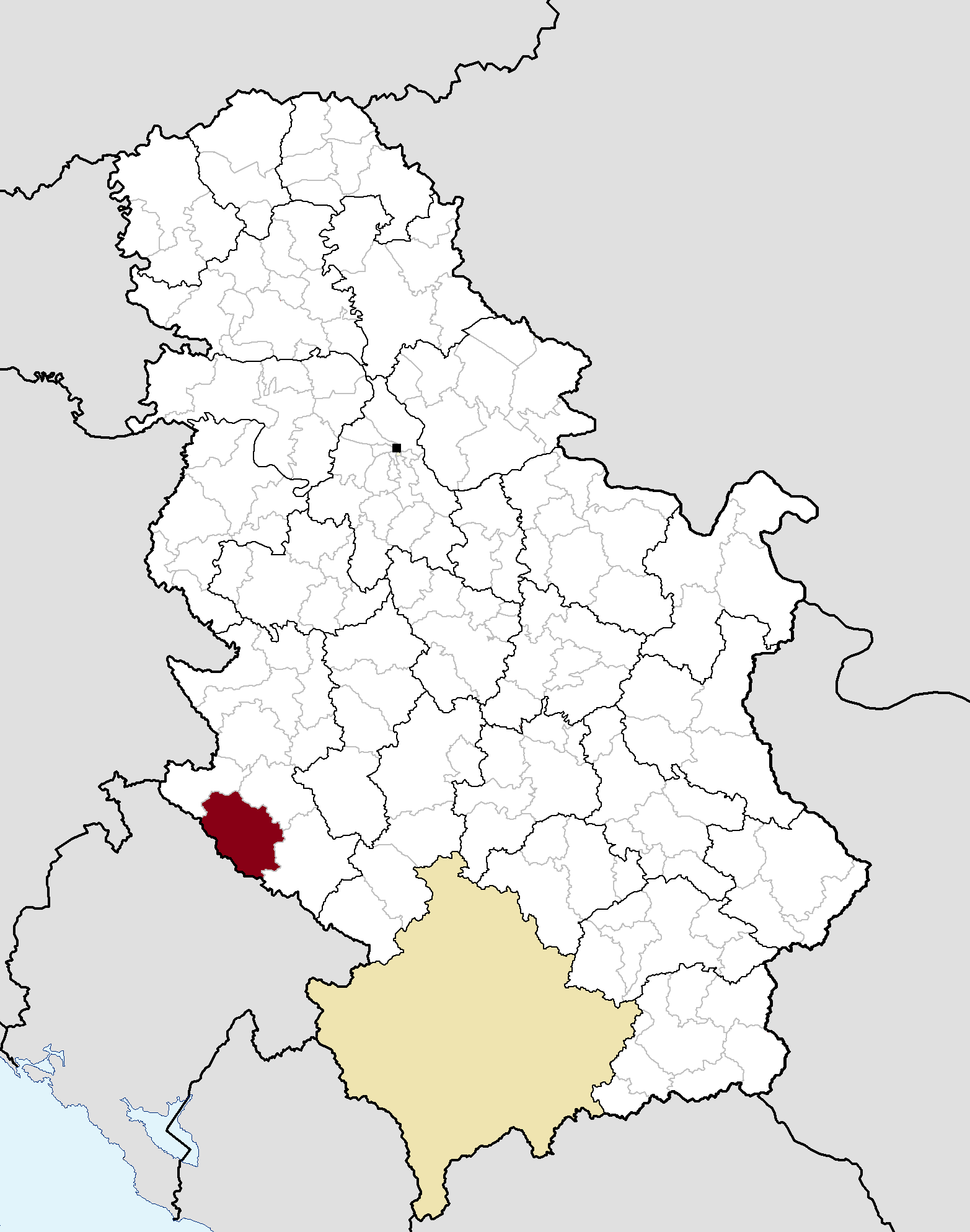
- Location of the municipality of Prijepolje within Serbia
- Coordinates: 43°23′N 19°38′E
- Country: Serbia
- Region: Šumadija and Western Serbia
- District: Zlatibor
- First time mentioned: 7 July 1343
- Settlements: 96

Government
  - Mayor: Drago Popadić (SNS)

Area
  - Town: 9.67 km^{2} (3.73 sq mi)
  - Municipality: 827 km^{2} (319 sq mi)
- Elevation: 557 m (1,827 ft)
- Highest elevation: 1,734 m (5,689 ft)
- Lowest elevation: 440 m (1,440 ft)

Population (2022 census)
  - Town: 11,928
  - Town density: 1,230/km^{2} (3,190/sq mi)
  - Municipality: 32,214
  - Municipality density: 39.0/km^{2} (101/sq mi)
- Time zone: UTC+1 (CET)
  - Summer (DST): UTC+2 (CEST)
- Postal code: 31300
- Area code: +381(0)33
- Car plates: PP
- Official languages: Serbian together with Bosnian
- Website: www.prijepolje.ls.gov.rs

Prijepolje (Serbian Cyrillic: Пријепоље, pronounced [prijěːpoʎe]) is a town and municipality located in the Zlatibor District of southwestern Serbia. As of 2022, the town has 11,928 inhabitants, while the municipality has 32,214 inhabitants.

== Etymology ==
One possible meaning of the name Prijepolje is "Prija's field", where Prija is the owner of polje, the "field" in English. However, a more likely theory is that the name originates from the location of Prijepolje and its relationship to the travels of caravans. When those caravans were passing through the area which would become Prijepolje, they would arrive at the settlement "before the fields", where the present day neighborhoods of Ivanje and Velika Župa are located. "Prije" means "before", and "polje" means "field", hence, the location might be called Prijepolje.

== Geography ==
Prijepolje is located at the confluence of the fast-flowing Lim and Mileševka rivers. It is also situated along the road from Belgrade to the Adriatic Sea, as well as being a stop on the Belgrade – Bar railway. The Belgrade – Adriatic road intersects here with the regional road between Pljevlja, Prijepolje and Sjenica. This regional road follows roughly the same route as the ancient Roman road known as the Dubrovnik road. Just north of Prijepolje, at Bistrica, there is a road leading towards Priboj, Višegrad and Sarajevo. Prijepolje is surrounded by hills, such as Pušina, Srijeteži, Gradina and Sokolica, which, prior to the construction of the "Potpeć" hydro plant near Nova Varoš, created a unique climate around the municipality. Since the hydro plant's construction, Prijepolje's climate has been changed into one that is typical for this cold part of Serbia. The highest peak in the Prijepolje area is Katunić, which reaches 1,734 meters above sea level.

Forests surround most of Prijepolje, however, along the Lim, there are numerous beaches. Two of the most popular beaches are under bridges, one at the centre of the town, under the bridge in Ivanje, and another under the bridge in Petrovac.

=== Climate ===
Prijepolje has a humid continental climate (Köppen climate classification: Dfb), that's very close to an oceanic climate (Köppen climate classification: Cfb).

Climate data for Prijepolje
Month	Jan	Feb	Mar	Apr	May	Jun	Jul	Aug	Sep	Oct	Nov	Dec	Year
Mean daily maximum °C (°F)	3.8 (38.8)	6.7 (44.1)	11.8 (53.2)	15.6 (60.1)	20.5 (68.9)	24.0 (75.2)	26.6 (79.9)	26.9 (80.4)	23.3 (73.9)	17.6 (63.7)	10.0 (50.0)	5.3 (41.5)	16.0 (60.8)
Daily mean °C (°F)	0.0 (32.0)	2.4 (36.3)	6.7 (44.1)	10.3 (50.5)	14.8 (58.6)	18.2 (64.8)	20.3 (68.5)	20.4 (68.7)	17.0 (62.6)	12.1 (53.8)	6.0 (42.8)	1.9 (35.4)	10.8 (51.5)
Mean daily minimum °C (°F)	−3.7 (25.3)	−1.9 (28.6)	1.6 (34.9)	5.0 (41.0)	9.2 (48.6)	12.5 (54.5)	14.1 (57.4)	13.9 (57.0)	10.7 (51.3)	6.7 (44.1)	2.0 (35.6)	−1.5 (29.3)	5.7 (42.3)
Average precipitation mm (inches)	89 (3.5)	81 (3.2)	79 (3.1)	88 (3.5)	96 (3.8)	87 (3.4)	73 (2.9)	69 (2.7)	85 (3.3)	97 (3.8)	115 (4.5)	106 (4.2)	1,065 (41.9)
Source: Climate-Data.org

== History ==
The Mileševa Monastery was built in Prijepolje by Stefan Vladislav in 1234. Prior to its establishment as a settlement, the area was occupied as far back as the Stone Age. First settled by Illyrians, who migrated to the area after being forced out of the northern plains, they retreated to the more defensible and less accessible mountainous regions. Later arrivals were the Celts, with whom the Illyrians intermarried. With the arrival by the Romans, the Illyrians were again forced to flee, and after the Romans, the Slavs settled in the area, intermixing with some of the earlier Illyrians. The Goths, Huns, Gepids, Langobards and Avars also passed through this area. The most interesting archaeological site in the territory is the Roman necropolis near the modern settlement of Kolovrat where pieces of ancient glass, silver, ceramics, and gold have been unearthed.

Prijepolje was mentioned for the first time by Gijom Adam in 1332 while it was part of Dubrovnik's sphere of influence. According to historical sources, Prijepolje developed as a road settlement for caravans along the route known as "Dubrovnik's road", a road connecting the central and eastern Balkans with the middle Adriatic coast. The caravan route crossed rugged mountainous and forested terrain, making travel difficult for travelers. Local villagers were tasked with protecting local roads, due to the statute which said, "If, on the road, someone has been killed or has had a bullet stuck into his body, let the local guardians gather together to pay the damage. Hitting by one small drum, the passers by would know that there was no danger".

By 1477, part of the Albanian Mataruge tribe lived in the kaza of Prijepolje, where they formed their own distinct community (nahiye) with 10 villages (katund).

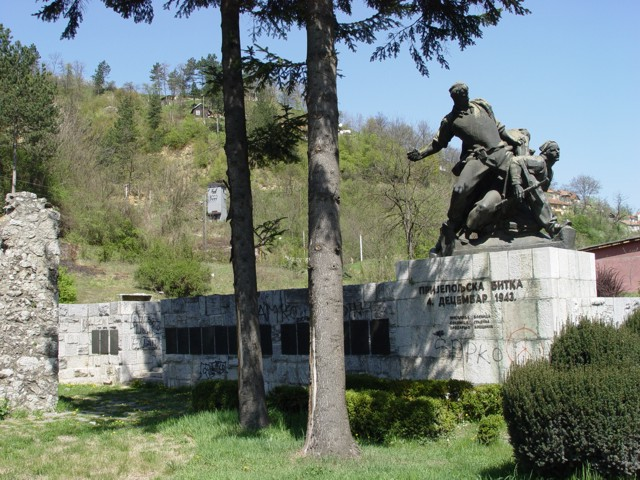
Monument to the victims of the Operation Kugelblitz (1943)

There was a cartographic reference to Prijepolje in "Regno della Servia detta altrimentri Rascia" by Giacomo Cantelli da Vignola, cartographer to the Duke of Modena, in 1689.

During the Ottoman period, there were quite a few buildings constructed in Prijepolje. Most famous of these are Ibrahim Pasha's mosque and the Sahat Kula. Pasha's mosque is located in Šarampov, one of three regions in town (the other two being Vakuf and the Town Center), and was most likely built in the 16th century. It is adorned with a single minaret, and covered by a "cheramida" (a special covering of the houses in that time). The region has a very tumultuous past. It was part of First Serbian revolt in 1875, known as Banine's revolt, as well as seeing the Javorian War in 1876, the Raonić Revolt, the Balkan Wars in 1912 and 1913, and both World Wars. In 1912, during the First Balkan War, control of Prijepolje passed from the Ottoman Empire to the Kingdom of Montenegro.

During World War II, Prijepolje officially became part of the Kingdom of Montenegro, a pro-Axis puppet state. Prijepolje was liberated on 4 December 1943, which is now celebrated as the Day of the Liberation of Prijepolje.

== Settlements ==
The municipality of Prijepolje covers an area of 824 km^{2} (318 sq mi) with an altitude ranging from 440–1,735 metres (1,444–5,692 ft). Not including the town of Prijepolje itself, it contains 96 other settlements. Those settlements are as follows, with population figures according to the 2002 census:

- Aljinovići (196)
- Balići (434)
- Bare (56)
- Biskupići (22)
- Bjelahova (82)
- Brajkovac (87)
- Brodarevo (1780)
- Brvine (175)
- Bukovik (107)
- Čadinje (267)
- Čauševići (132)
- Crkveni Toci (78)
- Divci (335)
- Donje Babine (319)
- Donji Stranjani (120)
- Drenova (208)
- Đurašići (265)
- Dušmanići (245)
- Džurovo (179)
- Gojakovići (183)
- Gornje Babine (262)
- Gornje Goračiće (58)
- Gornji Stranjani (85)
- Gostun (49)
- Gračanica (199)
- Grobnice (254)
- Hisardžik (285)
- Hrta (130)
- Ivanje (1140)
- Ivezići (170)
- Izbičanj (46)
- Jabuka (502)
- Junčevići (301)
- Kaćevo (55)
- Kamena Gora (210)
- Karaula (63)
- Karoševina (199)
- Kašice (88)
- Koprivna (49)
- Kosatica (353)
- Koševine (1049)
- Kovačevac (1613)
- Kruševo (36)
- Kučin (169)
- Lučice (169)
- Mataruge (164)
- Međani (80)
- Mijani (25)
- Mijoska (750)
- Milakovići (66)
- Mileševo (121)
- Miljevići (455)
- Milošev Do (126)
- Mrčkovina (33)
- Muškovina (34)
- Oraovac (336)
- Orašac (204)
- Osoje (526)
- Oštra Stijena (123)
- Potkrš (124)
- Potok (282)
- Pranjci (360)
- Pravoševo (85)
- Rasno (410)
- Ratajska (2088)
- Sedobro (322)
- Seljane (168)
- Seljašnica (774)
- Skokuće (105)
- Slatina (138)
- Sopotnica (136)
- Taševo (2061)
- Vinicka (474)
- Vrbovo (99)
- Zabrdnji Toci (133)
- Zalug (1047)
- Zastup (128)
- Zavinograđe (1272)
- Zvijezd (104)

== Demographics ==
Historical population
Year	Pop.	±% p.a.
1948	31,328	—
1953	35,568	+2.57%
1961	38,925	+1.13%
1971	44,022	+1.24%
1981	46,902	+0.64%
1991	46,525	−0.08%
2002	41,188	−1.10%
2011	37,059	−1.17%
2022	32,214	−1.27%

According to the 2022 census, the municipality of Prijepolje has 32,214 inhabitants, and 63% of the municipality's population is rural.

=== Ethnic groups ===
Prijepolje is an ethnically mixed town and municipality.

The ethnic structure of population of town of Prijepolje (according to the 2022 census):

Ethnicity	Population	Share
Serbs	6,683	56%
Bosniaks	3,428	28.7%
Muslims	623	5.2%
Others	262	2.2%
Undeclared	225	1.9%
Unknown	700	5.8%

The ethnic structure of population of Prijepolje municipality (according to the 2022 census):

Ethnicity	Population	Share
Serbs	14,961	46.4%
Bosniaks	12,842	39.8%
Muslims	1,945	6%
Others	387	1.2%
Undeclared	379	1.1%
Unknown	1,700	5.2%

=== Religion ===
Based on the 2022 census, in the municipality of Prijepolje, Muslims surpassed the Orthodox Christians, becoming a relative plurality of 46.8% of the population.

Religion	Adherents	Share
Islam	15,066	46.8%
Orthodox	14,941	46.4%
Other Christians	97	0.3%
Undeclared	440	1.3%
Unknown	1,670	5.2%

== Economy ==
The following table gives a preview of total number of registered people employed in legal entities per their core activity (as of 2018):

Activity	Total
Agriculture, forestry and fishing	174
Mining and quarrying	4
Manufacturing	1,804
Electricity, gas, steam and air conditioning supply	61
Water supply; sewerage, waste management and remediation activities	90
Construction	415
Wholesale and retail trade, repair of motor vehicles and motorcycles	1,220
Transportation and storage	655
Accommodation and food services	312
Information and communication	61
Financial and insurance activities	87
Real estate activities	14
Professional, scientific and technical activities	186
Administrative and support service activities	204
Public administration and defense; compulsory social security	687
Education	529
Human health and social work activities	598
Arts, entertainment and recreation	120
Other service activities	154
Individual agricultural workers	76
Total	7,455

== Culture and tourism ==
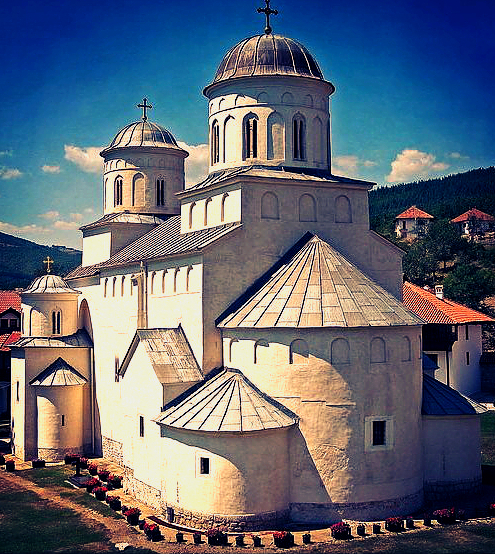
Mileševa monastery

Prijepolje has many historical monuments from both the periods of Christianity and Islam. The Mileševa monastery is located 6 km to the east of Prijepolje on the Mileševka River. The monastery is famous for The White Angel fresco, a famous and widely used religious icon in Serbia as well as being the former resting place of St. Sava, Serbia's most honored patriarch.

A famous monument from the Turkish period, the Sahat-Kula, is in town, as well as several mosques, one of which is in Hisardžik, interesting because of a four-hundred-year-old wooden Quran which was recently unearthed. Jusovića's kula tower, built in the 18th century as a protective house tower for the wealthy. Currently in ruins, there are plans being made to reconstruct this building, adding another unique monument to Prijepolje.

The Museum of Prijepolje is a very significant part of the cultural life of Prijepolje. It serves as a gathering place for artists from diverse locations to visit Prijepolje, and corroborate on large projects to improve the town's culture. In addition to the museum, there is also another major cultural building in Prijepolje, where amateurs, led by Meša Šendelj, are very active in refreshing the cultural life in Prijepolje.

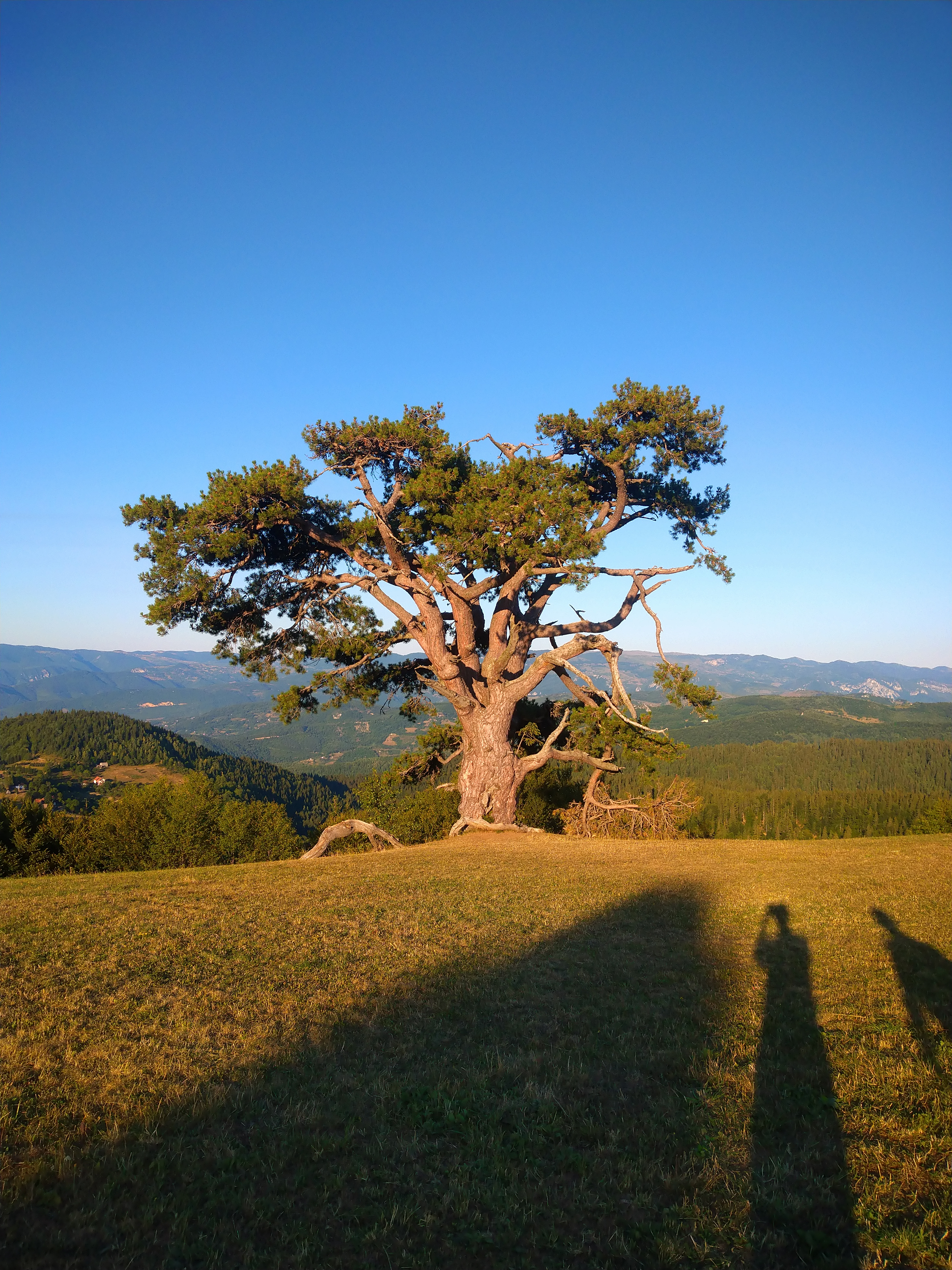
Sveti Bor or the Holy Pine

Sveti Bor, known as the "Holy Pine," is a 5 centuries-old tree that has played a significant role in the village of Kamena Gora a nearby village. During the Ottoman occupation, the villagers were unable to construct a church, and this ancient pine served as a substitute, becoming a spiritual gathering point. Over time, Sveti Bor has not only become a symbol of the region but also a notable tourist destination. Its cultural importance and remarkable beauty, attributed to its great age, continue to attract visitors from all over the country.

== Society ==
=== Education ===
There are 2 kindergartens and one elementary school in town. Prijepolje also has a Gymnasium, a technical high school, an economics high school, and a higher technical school.

=== Sport ===
In Prijepolje there are many forms of recreation. There is the local football club "FK Polimlje", as well as "FK Jasen" from nearby Brodarevo (also in the municipality of Prijepolje). There are volleyball clubs like "FAP-Livnica" and "Putevi", a handball club "White angel", and a chess club "Priko". Many parks and playfields are in and around town. Traditionally every year during MOSI (an annual regional sporting event), both the male and female volleyball teams representing Prijepolje see great success. Ilija Andrejic, an alpinist from Prijepolje, together with the Serbian alpinist team, successfully climbed Mount Everest.

- On 14 of July, Prijepolje was the host of the European coupe in rafting on the Lim River.
- On 22 of September 2007, Vlade Divac, came to Prijepolje, with a group of NBA basketball players, and opened the newly built museum building.

Besides basketball player Vlade Divac and numerous volleyball man and woman players, other notable sportspeople from Prijepolje are footballers Spaso Perić, Muhamed Preljević, Latif Čičić, Mirsad Kahrović, Ljubomir Brašnjević, Husein Mekić, Mihajlo Pjanović, Ivica Dragutinović, while Dragoslav Divac, Siniša Nestorović, Stevo Ljujić and Vule Maksimović archived notability in athletics.

=== Media ===
There is one weekly newspaper published in Prijepolje, Polimlje, and three radio stations. There is also one media civic station working from 2008 called Television Forum, operated by NGO Women forum of Prijepolje. There are two wireless internet operators, one TV cable operator, and two private TV and radio stations. Prijepolje got digital telephonic central since May 2003.

Flyer from REFRACT festival in Prijepolje

=== Events ===
- "Sopotnički izvori", is held near the famous Sopotnica's waterfalls, where you can hear old national songs.
- A famous diving demonstration is held at Petrovac, consisting of highly ranked divers from the Balkan region.
- There is a famous art colony called Mileševa, consisting of many artists from this municipality.
- "Gifts from Lim", is a sports and entertainment event where you can see diverse activities such as beach volleyball, a fish-soup making contest, and Prijepolje's Best son-in-law contest.
- "July Fires" is a unique annual football tournament held at the highest mountain in the Zlatibor District, Jadovnik.It brings together people and players from Bosnia, Montenegro, and Serbia. The tournament is held on the first sunday after St. Peter's day every year.

=== Activism and youth ===
There are 29 registered non-governmental organisations in Prijepolje, the most active ones being Jump, Helium, New Vision, Scout's "Boško Buha", Friends of Brodarevo, Friends of Sopotnica and Friends of Kamena Gora. Prijepolje has the first civic television program in Serbia run by a women's organization, the Woman Forum.

Prijepolje opened a Youth Club, under the auspices of National Strategy for Youth, and the Youth office of municipality Prijepolje was created in April 2008. The Youth Office's priority is to care for the rights and wills of the youth of the area, through constant youth work using the goals of local and national development organizations.

== Gallery ==
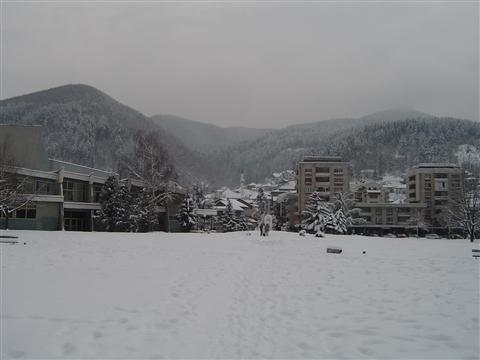
Prijepolje in winter

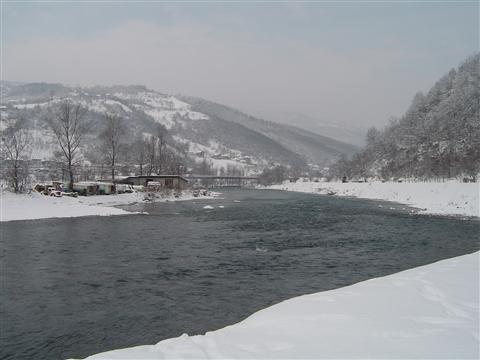
The river Lim

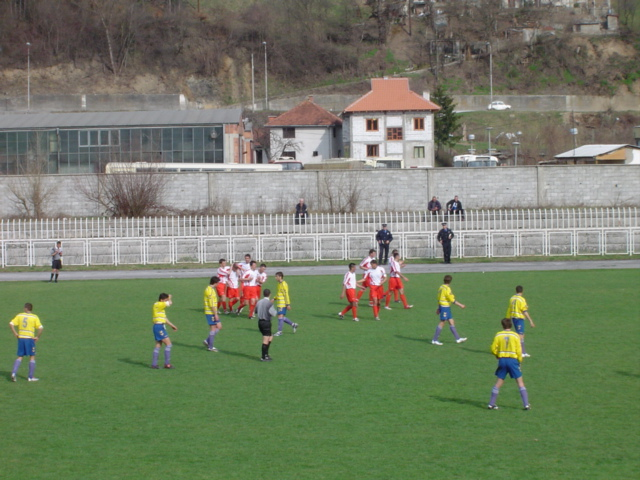
Footballers of FK Polimlje celebrating a goal.

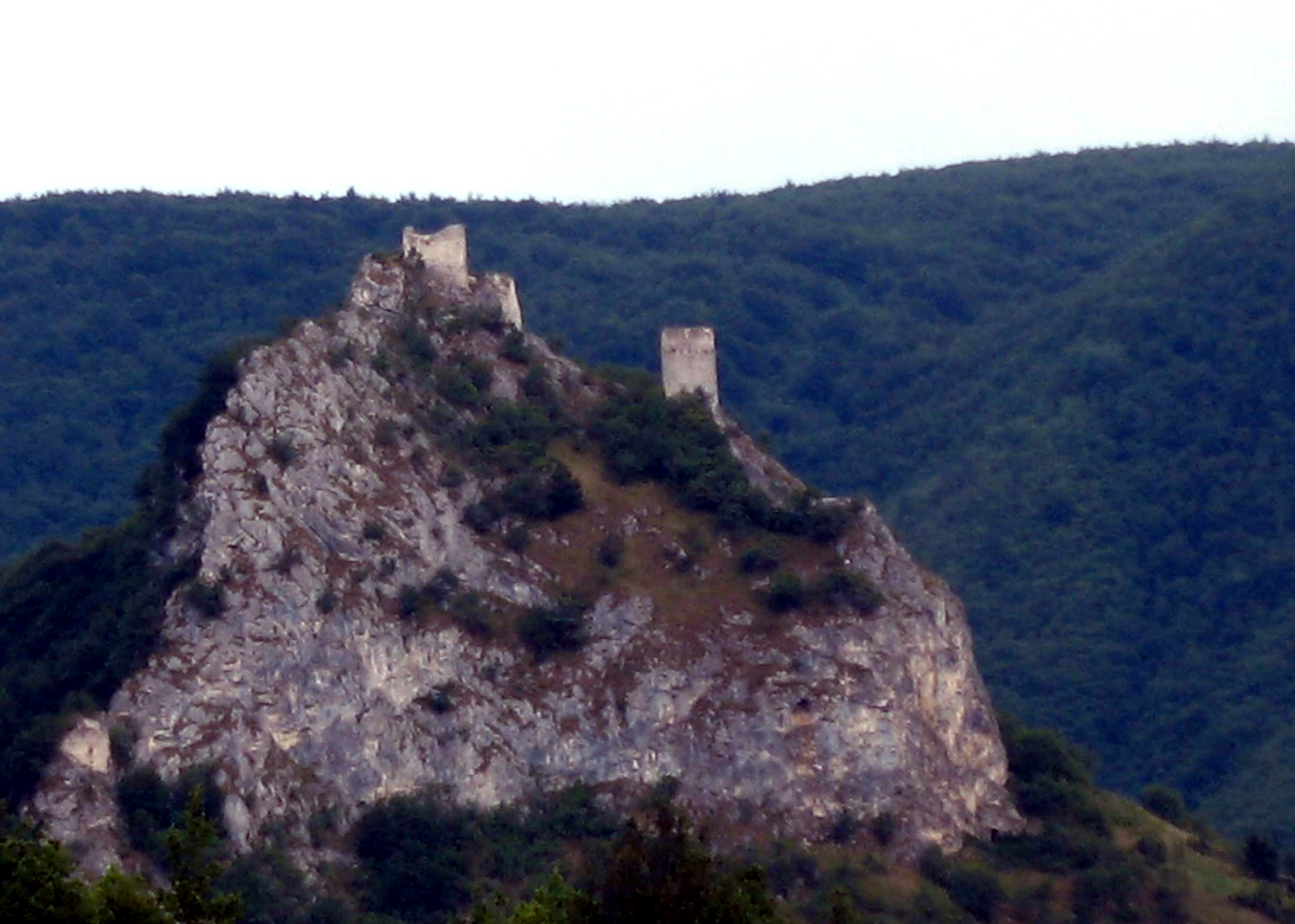
Mileševac fortrerss

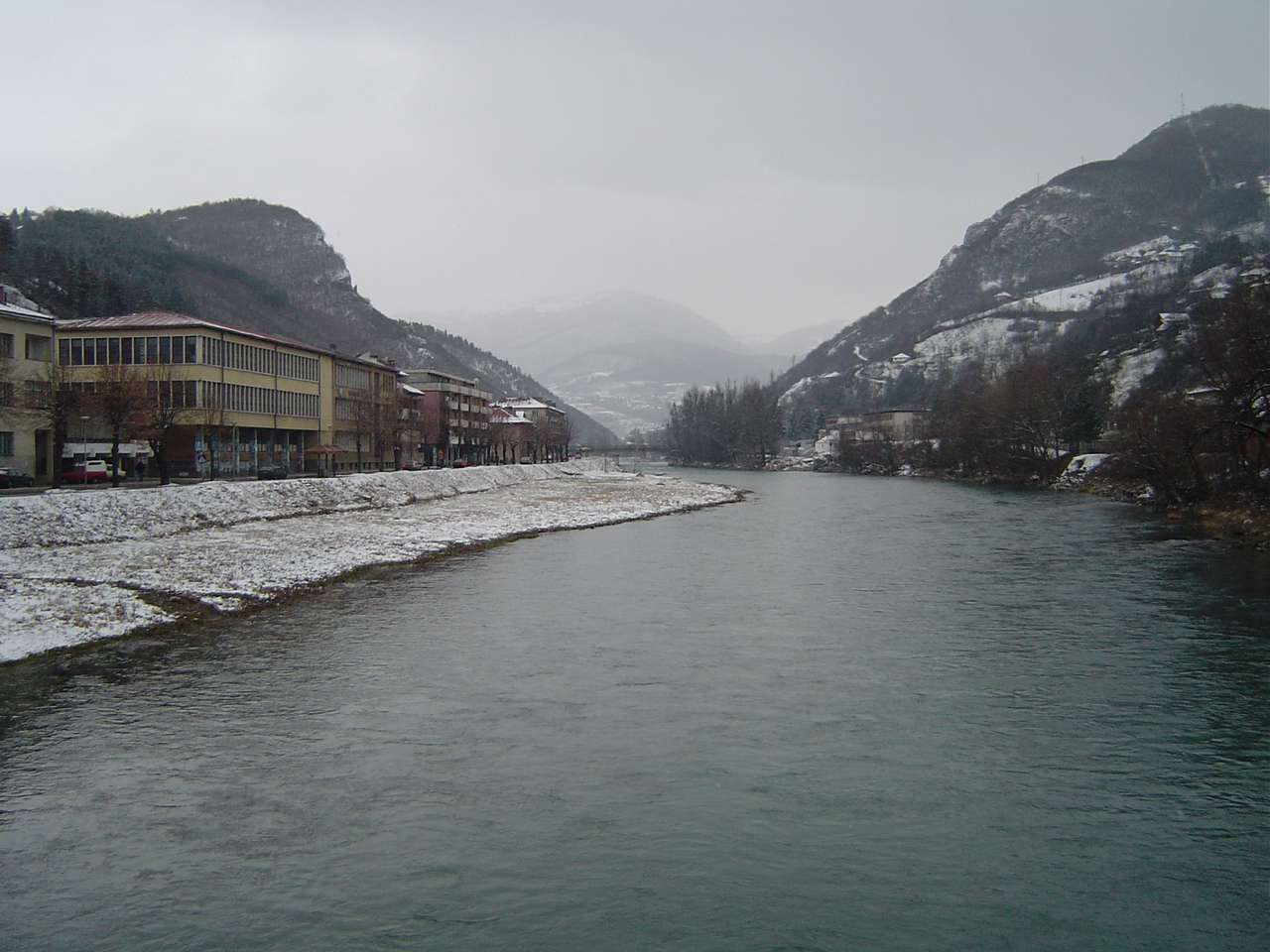
Lim flowing through Prijepolje in the winter.

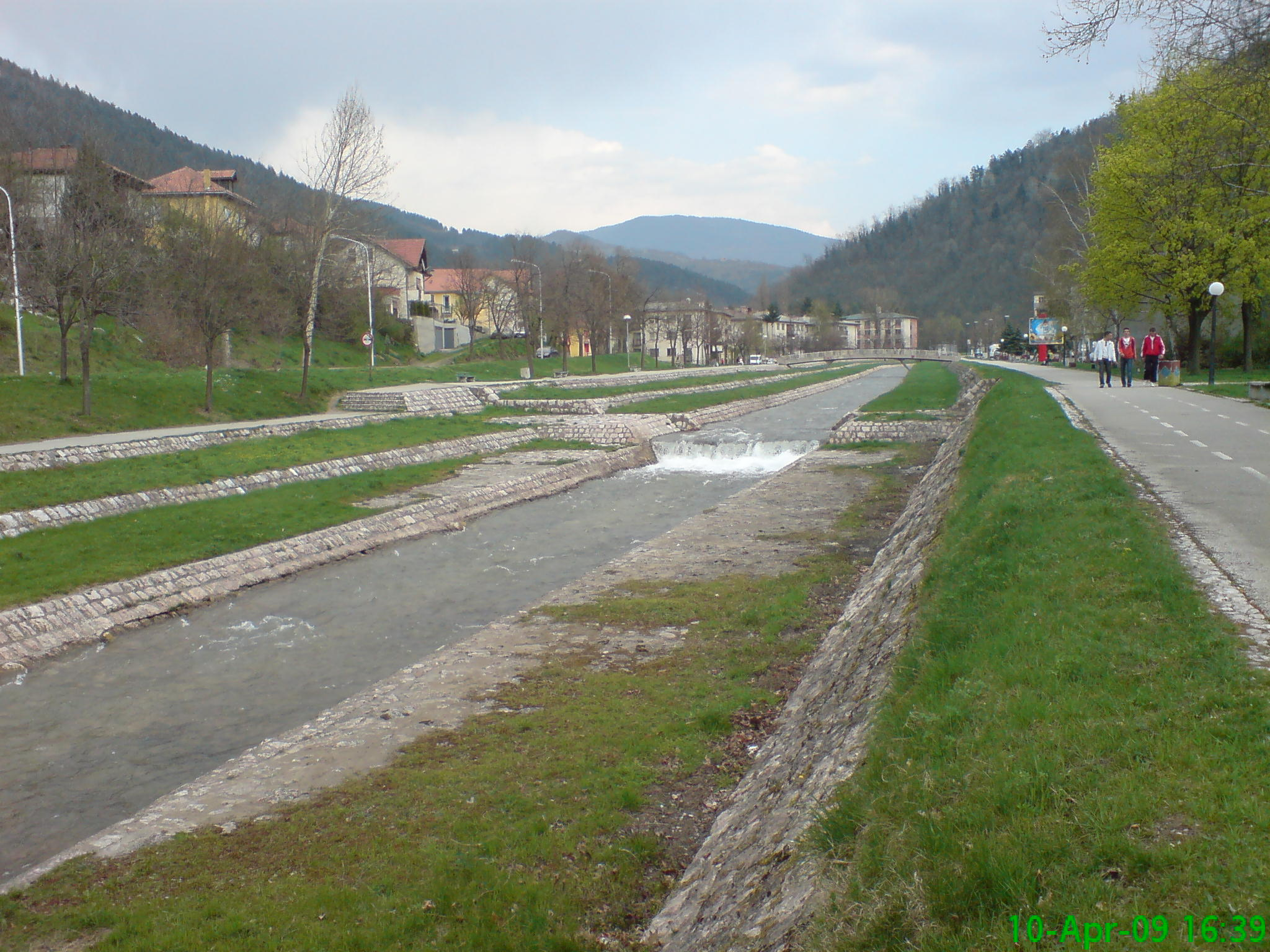
Mileševka river in Prijepolje.

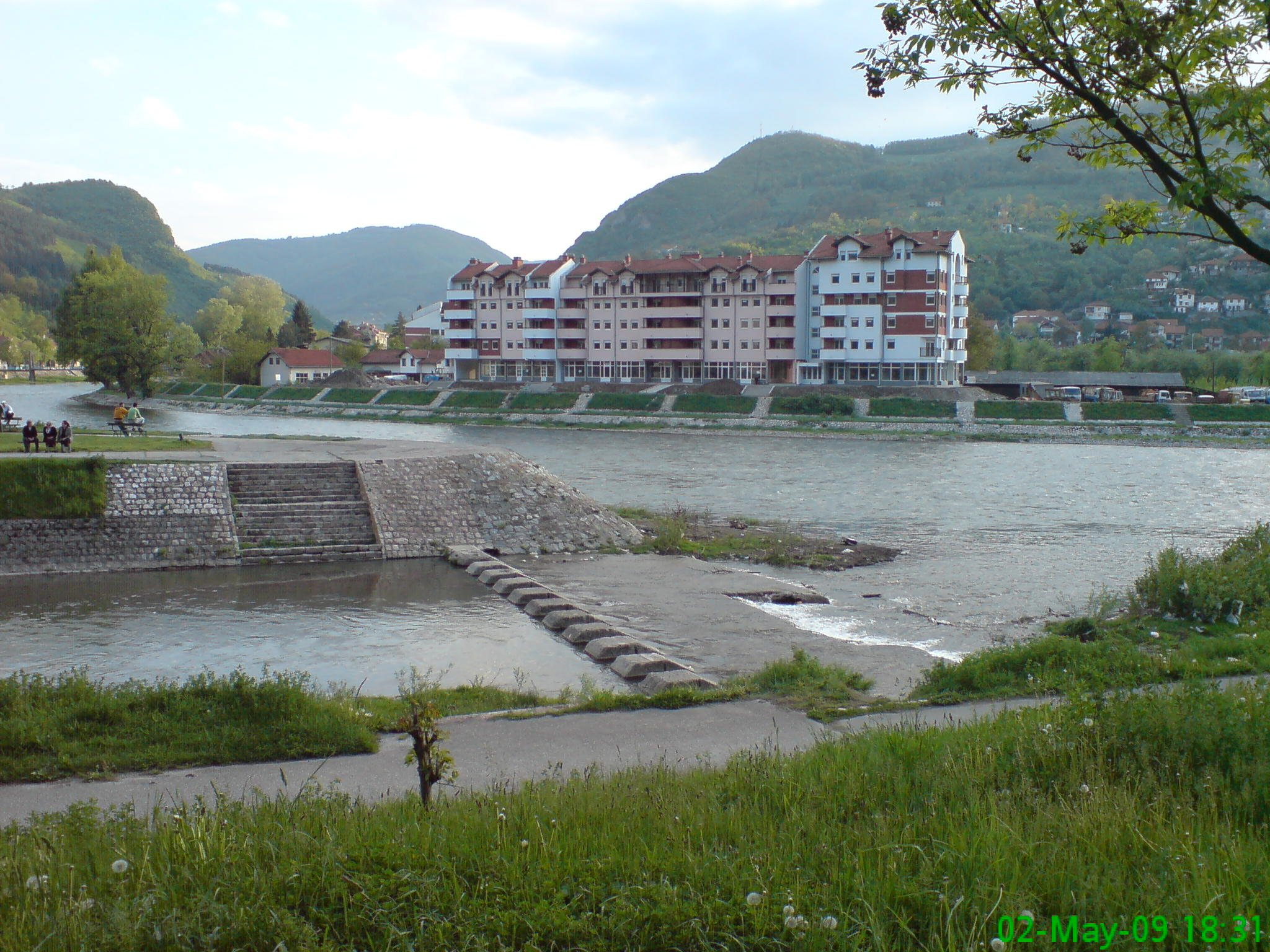
Confluence of Mileševka river in the Lim.

== Coat of arms ==
The coat of arms of Prijepolje depicts the mountain Zlatar (zlat from the word zlato which means gold in Serbian), the golden "pyramid of Zlatar", the sign of Saint Sava and two crowns which symbolize the two coronations which took place in Prijepolje. The more famous coronation was that of the King of Bosnia and the Serbs, Tvrtko I. Also on the coat of arms are two white angels from a fresco located in the monastery of Mileševa. The angels are holding the flags of Serbia, and Prijepolje. The curved line represents the Lim River.

== Notable people ==
- Valter Perić, World War II Partisan
- Sreten Vukosavljević, minister in 1944. first Yugoslav government, sociologist, journalist, political active for decentralization of Sanjak region as unified region
- Savatije Sokolović, Serbian Patriarch
- Svetomir Borisavljevic, member of parliament of Yugoslavia before World War II, lawyer
- Vlade Divac, former NBA player, two-time Olympic silver medalist, World and European champion
- Nemanja Petrić, volleyball player, European champion
- Dženan Lončarević, pop singer
- Aco Pejović, pop-folk singer
- Zvonimir Červenko, Croatian General
- Sefer Halilović, Bosnian Army general and politician
- Latif Čičić, footballer
- Ivica Dragutinović, footballer
- Mihajlo Pjanović, footballer
- Muhamed Preljević, footballer
- Armin Sinančević, Serbian shot putter
- Zećira Mušović, Swedish Goalkeeper
- Filip Zekavičić, basketball player

== International relations ==
=== Twin towns — sister cities ===
Prijepolje is twinned with:

- (Switzerland) Köniz
- (Turkey) Eyüp
- (Serbia) Aranđelovac
- (Italy) Bologna

== See also ==
- Bosniaks in Serbia
- Lim River
- Zlatibor District
- List of places in Serbia
- Sandžak
