= Toçi =

Toçi is an Albanian surname. Notable people with the surname include:

- Eljon Toçi (born 2003), Albanian footballer
- Elvis Toci, Albanian sport manager and president of the Albanian Ski Federation
- Fatmir Toçi (born 1958), Albanian publisher
- Mateos Toçi (born 1993), Albanian football player
- Piero Toci (born 1949), Italian tennis player
- Terenzio Tocci (1880–1945), Albanian politician
