= 1998–99 Real Madrid CF season =

97th season in existence of Real Madrid CF

Real Madrid
1998–99 season
- President: Lorenzo Sanz
- Head coach: José Antonio Camacho (until 9 July 1998); Guus Hiddink (until 24 February 1999); John Toshack
- Stadium: Santiago Bernabéu
- La Liga: 2nd
- Copa del Rey: Semi-finals
- UEFA Champions League: Quarter-finals
- UEFA Super Cup: Runners-up
- Intercontinental Cup: Winners
- Top goalscorer: League: Raúl (25); All: Raúl (28)
- Biggest win: Real Madrid 6–1 Sturm Graz
- Biggest defeat: Valencia 6–0 Real Madrid
Home colours	Away colours	Third colours

The 1998–99 season was Real Madrid's 68th season in La Liga.

== Summary ==
Real Madrid sacked Jupp Heynckes shortly after winning the Champions League in May and hired Jose Antonio Camacho who quit as manager in July. After a failed bid on Nevio Scala the club appointed former Valencia coach Guus Hiddink as its new head coach. Having come fourth in the league and achieving continental success last season, Real Madrid was considered a favorite for the 1998–99 season. There were also new arrivals such as Edgar Pacheco, Robert Jarni and Perica Ognjenović. Despite these transfers, manager Hiddink was sacked in February due to criticizing several players. On 24 February 1999, after failed moves for Fabio Capello and Marcello Lippi, the club eventually re-appointed John Benjamin Toshack as its new head coach, helping the squad to reach a spot for the upcoming UEFA Champions League. In Copa del Rey, the team also suffered an embarrassing semi-final exit after a 2–7 aggregate loss to eventual cup winners Valencia, as well as the Champions League quarter-finals exit against Ukrainian powerhouse Dynamo Kyiv, only winning the Intercontinental Cup that season.

== Squad ==
Note: Flags indicate national team as defined under FIFA eligibility rules; some limited exceptions apply. Players may hold more than one non-FIFA nationality.

No.	Pos.	Nation	Player
1	GK	GER	Bodo Illgner
2	DF	ITA	Christian Panucci
3	DF	BRA	Roberto Carlos
4	DF	ESP	Fernando Hierro
5	DF	ESP	Manolo Sanchís
6	DF	ARG	Fernando Redondo
7	FW	ESP	Raúl
8	FW	YUG	Predrag Mijatović
9	FW	CRO	Davor Šuker
10	MF	NED	Clarence Seedorf
11	FW	BRA	Sávio
12	DF	ESP	Iván Campo
13	GK	ESP	Pedro Contreras

No.	Pos.	Nation	Player
14	MF	ESP	Guti
15	FW	ESP	Fernando Morientes
16	MF	ESP	Jaime
17	DF	CRO	Robert Jarni
18	DF	ESP	Aitor Karanka
19	DF	ESP	Fernando Sanz
20	FW	YUG	Perica Ognjenović
21	DF	ESP	Rojas
22	MF	FRA	Christian Karembeu
23	MF	CMR	Samuel Eto'o
24	MF	ESP	Álvaro Benito
29	DF	ESP	Manuel Tena
31	FW	ESP	Tote

=== Transfers ===
In
Pos.	Name	from	Type
MF	Robert Jarni	Coventry City	£3,400,000
DF	Iván Campo	Mallorca	
FW	Samuel Eto'o	Leganes	loan ended
MF	Álvaro Benito	Tenerife	loan ended

Out
Pos.	Name	To	Type
GK	Santiago Cañizares	Valencia	
FW	Dani García	Mallorca	
DF	Chendo		retired
MF	Victor	Racing Santander	
MF	Zé Roberto	Bayer Leverkusen	€7,000,000

==== Winter ====
In
Pos.	Name	from	Type
MF	Perica Ognjenovic	Flamengo	€2,500,000
FW	Rolando Zárate	Velez Sarsfield	

Out
Pos.	Name	To	Type
MF	José Amavisca	Racing Santander	

== Pre-season and friendlies ==
22 July 1998 Friendly	Stade Nyonnais	0–5	Real Madrid	Nyon, Switzerland
			Sávio 33'; Guti 48', 90' (pen.); Mista 80', 82'	Stadium: Colovray; Attendance: 1,800; Referee: Dominique Tavel (Switzerland)

24 July 1998 Friendly	Chênois	0–15	Real Madrid	Thônex, Switzerland
			Eto'o 1', 35', 90+6'; Jaime 8'; Víctor 14' (pen.); Hadjami 22' (o.g.); Guti 28', 38', 59', 68'; Sávio 49', 70'; Mista 54'; Edgar 65' (pen.), 79'	Stadium: Stade des Trois-Chêne; Referee: Markus Nobs (Switzerland)

28 July 1998 Friendly	Sion	1–0	Real Madrid	Sion, Switzerland
	Benson 45'			Stadium: Stade Tourbillon; Referee: Bortolini (Switzerland)

9 August 1998 1998 Ciudad de Alicante Trophy	Hércules	1–2	Real Madrid	Alicante, Spain
	Osterc 37'		Morientes 18'; Sávio 54'	Stadium: Estadio José Rico Pérez; Referee: Carlos Campos Andreu

12 August 1998 1998 Teresa Herrera Trophy	Real Madrid	2–2	Lazio	A Coruña, Spain
	Morientes 13'; Sávio 49'		Nedvěd 35'; Salas 41'	Stadium: Riazor; Referee: Eduardo Iturralde González

14 August 1998 1998 Teresa Herrera Trophy	Real Madrid	4–0	Atlético Madrid	A Coruña, Spain
	Raúl 23', 47'; Morientes 44'; Sávio 45'			Stadium: Riazor; Referee: Evaristo Puentes Leira

23 August 1998 1998 Ciudad de Cartagena Trophy	Real Madrid	3–1	Borussia Mönchengladbach	Cartagena, Spain
	Panucci 7'; Hierro 37' (pen.); Seedorf 54'		Polster 35'	Stadium: Estadio Cartagonova; Referee: Soler Gallardo

8 September 1998 1998 Trofeo Santiago Bernabéu	Real Madrid	4–0	Peñarol	Madrid, Spain
	Roberto Carlos 18'; Guti 28', 52'; Amavisca 57'			Stadium: Santiago Bernabéu Stadium; Referee: Manuel Díaz Vega

10 November 1998 Friendly	San Fernando	1–7	Real Madrid	Madrid, Spain
	Guy 62'		Sanz 2'; Morientes 6', 20'; Amavisca 12'; Karanka 32', 88'; Eto'o 66'	Stadium: Estadio Santiago del Pino; Referee: Mergelina González

17 November 1998 Friendly	Las Rozas	1–5	Real Madrid	Madrid, Spain
	Santi 55'		Guti 19'; Šuker 44', 53'; Morientes 56'; Eto'o 70'	Stadium: Dehesa de Navalcarbón; Referee: Calvo Franco

30 December 1998 Hurricane Mitch Benefit Match	Real Madrid	0–2	Atlético Madrid	Madrid, Spain
			Roberto 47'; Valerón 50'	Stadium: Santiago Bernabéu Stadium; Referee: José María García-Aranda

19 May 1999 Santo Domingo Inauguration	Alcorcón	0–0	Real Madrid	Madrid, Spain
				Stadium: Santo Domingo; Referee: Peral Hernández

== Competitions ==
=== La Liga ===
==== League table ====
Pos	Team	Pld	W	D	L	GF	GA	GD	Pts	Qualification or relegation
1	Barcelona (C)	38	24	7	7	87	43	+44	79	Qualification for the Champions League group stage
2	Real Madrid	38	21	5	12	77	62	+15	68	Qualification for the Champions League group stage
3	Mallorca	38	20	6	12	48	31	+17	66	Qualification for the Champions League third qualifying round
4	Valencia	38	19	8	11	63	39	+24	65	Qualification for the Champions League third qualifying round
5	Celta Vigo	38	17	13	8	69	41	+28	64	Qualification for the UEFA Cup first round

Source: LFP
Rules for classification: 1) points; 2) head-to-head points; 3) head-to-head goal difference; 4) head-to-head goals scored; 5) goal difference; 6) number of goals scored.
(C) Champions

==== Positions by round ====
Round	1	2	3	4	5	6	7	8	9	10	11	12	13	14	15	16	17	18	19	20	21	22	23	24	25	26	27	28	29	30	31	32	33	34	35	36	37	38
Ground	A	H	A	H	A	H	H	A	H	A	H	A	H	A	H	A	H	A	H	H	A	H	A	H	A	A	H	A	H	A	H	A	H	A	H	A	H	A
Result	W	W	D	W	L	W	D	W	D	L	L	D	W	L	W	W	L	W	L	W	W	L	L	L	W	W	W	W	L	W	D	W	L	W	W	W	L	W
Position	1	1	1	1	2	1	2	1	2	4	4	3	4	3	3	3	6	4	6	5	3	5	6	7	6	6	5	4	5	3	5	4	5	3	3	2	3	2

Source: https://www.worldfootball.net/competition/ro11027/md38/results-and-standings/
A = Away; H = Home; W = Win; D = Draw; L = Loss; = Leader, 1999–2000 UEFA Champions League group stage; = 1999–2000 UEFA Champions League group stage; = 1999–2000 UEFA Champions League qualifying round; = 1999–2000 UEFA Cup; = 1999 UEFA Intertoto Cup; = 1999–2000 Segunda División

==== Matches ====
31 August 1998 1	Real Madrid	4–1	Villarreal	Madrid
	Raúl 34', 67'; Mijatović 50'; Sávio 59'		Craioveanu 3'	Stadium: Santiago Bernabéu Stadium; Referee: Juan Manuel Brito Arceo

12 September 1998 2	Valladolid	0–1	Real Madrid	Valladolid
			Mijatović 10'	Stadium: Estadio Nuevo José Zorrilla; Referee: José Javier Losantos Omar

19 September 1998 3	Real Madrid	2–2	Barcelona	Madrid
	Raúl 7', 25'		Kluivert 12'; Anderson 82'	Stadium: Santiago Bernabéu Stadium; Referee: Antonio Jesús López Nieto

26 September 1998 4	Athletic Bilbao	2–3	Real Madrid	Bilbao
	Urzaiz 21'; Ezquerro 79'		Raúl 13'; Mijatović 54'; Sávio 59'	Stadium: San Mamés Stadium; Referee: Arturo Daudén Ibáñez

4 October 1998 5	Real Madrid	0–1	Betis	Madrid
			Finidi 54'	Stadium: Santiago Bernabéu Stadium; Referee: Alfonso Pérez Burrull

17 October 1998 6	Zaragoza	3–4	Real Madrid	Zaragoza
	Milošević 22'; Gustavo López 60'; Kily González 75'		Hierro 10' (pen.); Roberto Carlos 17'; Raúl 40'; Mijatović 71'	Stadium: La Romareda; Referee: Julian Rodriguez Santiago

25 October 1998 7	Real Madrid	2–2	Racing Santander	Madrid
	Hierro 59' (pen.), 78'		Merino 44'; Beschastnykh 89'	Stadium: Santiago Bernabéu Stadium; Referee: Manuel Díaz Vega

31 October 1998 8	Extremadura	1–5	Real Madrid	Almendralejo
	Duré 67'		Jarni 1'; Sávio 24'; Hierro 36' (pen.); Šuker 60'; Seedorf 89'	Stadium: Estadio Francisco de la Hera; Referee: Juan Antonio Fernández Marín

8 November 1998 9	Alavés	1–1	Real Madrid	Vitoria-Gasteiz
	Canabal 34'		Roberto Carlos 50'	Stadium: Mendizorrotza Stadium; Referee: Manuel Mejuto González

14 November 1998 10	Real Madrid	1–2	Celta Vigo	Madrid
	Roberto Carlos 62'		Penev 21' (pen.); Makélélé 53'	Stadium: Santiago Bernabéu Stadium; Referee: Luis Medina Cantalejo

21 November 1998 11	Valencia	3–1	Real Madrid	Valencia
	Angulo 35'; López 62', 73'		Sávio 56'	Stadium: Mestalla; Referee: José Japón Sevilla

5 December 1998 13	Espanyol	0–0	Real Madrid	Barcelona
				Stadium: Estadi Cornellà-El Prat; Referee: Eduardo Iturralde González

13 December 1998 14	Real Madrid	3–2	Real Sociedad	Madrid
	Roberto Carlos 16'; Raúl 60'; Seedorf 86'		Kovačević 51', 65'	Stadium: Santiago Bernabéu Stadium; Referee: Juan Luis Ansuategui Roca

20 December 1998 15	Oviedo	1–0	Real Madrid	Oviedo
	Dely Valdés 75'			Stadium: Estadio Carlos Tartiere; Referee: Juan Manuel Brito Arceo

3 January 1999 16	Real Madrid	4–0	Tenerife	Madrid
	Raúl 2', 77'; Hierro 49' (pen.); Sávio 66'			Stadium: Santiago Bernabéu Stadium; Referee: Miguel Ángel Pérez Lasa

6 January 1999 12	Real Madrid	3–1	Salamanca	Madrid
	Raúl 35'; Šuker 54', 70'		Casartelli 29'	Stadium: Santiago Bernabéu Stadium; Referee: Eduardo Iturralde González

9 January 1999 17	Mallorca	2–1	Real Madrid	Mallorca
	Ibagaza 8'; Sanchís 27' (o.g.)		Seedorf 46'	Stadium: Estadio Lluís Sitjar; Referee: Alfonso Pérez Burrull

16 January 1999 18	Real Madrid	4–2	Atlético Madrid	Madrid
	Mijatovic 21'; Morientes 75'; Iván Campo 81'; Morientes 89'	Report	Juninho 46'; Correa 84'	Stadium: Estadio Santiago Bernabéu; Referee: Fernando Mendez

23 January 1999 19	Deportivo La Coruña	4–0	Real Madrid	A Coruña
	Fran 10'; Turu Flores 21'; Pauleta 36'; Turu Flores 70'	Report		Stadium: Estadio Riazor

29 January 1999 20	Villarreal	0–2	Real Madrid	Villarreal
	Oscar Tellez (yellow card) 53' (yellow-red card)	Report	Morientes 75'; Morientes 89'	Stadium: Estadio de la Ceramica; Referee: Arturo Ibañez

6 February 1999 21	Real Madrid	3–2	Valladolid	Madrid
	Raúl 17' (pen.); Raúl 50' (pen.); Raúl 89'	Report	Vizcaíno 64'; Klimowicz 86'	Stadium: Estadio Santiago Bernabéu; Referee: José Grimal

13 February 1999 22	Barcelona	3–0	Real Madrid	Barcelona
	Luis Enrique 4'; Luis Enrique 36'; Rivaldo 80'	Report	Roberto Carlos (red card) 20'	Stadium: Camp Nou; Referee: Eduardo González

19 February 1999 23	Real Madrid	0–1	Athletic Bilbao	Madrid
		Report	Ezquerro 72'	Stadium: Estadio Santiago Bernabéu; Referee: José Azurmendi

26 February 1999 24	Betis	3–2	Real Madrid	Madrid
	Fernando 12'; Cañas 67'; Ito 89'	Report	Raúl 25'; Morientes 74'; Panucci (yellow card) 86' (yellow-red card)	Stadium: Estadio Santiago Bernabéu; Referee: José Omar

6 March 1999 25	Real Madrid	3–2	Zaragoza	Madrid
	Raúl 20' (pen.); Morientes 47'; Raúl 89' (pen.)	Report	Kily González 72'; Kily González 74' (yellow card)	Stadium: Estadio Santiago Bernabéu; Referee: José García

12 March 1999 26	Racing Santander	1–3	Real Madrid	Santander
	Ruiz 31'	Report	Raúl 52'; Roberto Carlos 71'; Šuker 84'	Stadium: Estadio El Sardinero; Referee: Miguel Lasa

20 March 1999 27	Real Madrid	2–0	Extremadura	Madrid
	Raúl 29'; Herrera 52' (own goal)	Report		Stadium: Estadio Santiago Bernabéu; Referee: Manuel Vega

3 April 1999 28	Real Madrid	3–2	Alavés	Madrid
	Hierro 11'; Morientes 63'; Raúl 67'	Report	Gomez 9' (pen.); Sivori 18'	Stadium: Estadio Santiago Bernabéu; Referee: Luis Cantalejo

10 April 1999 29	Celta Vigo	5–1	Real Madrid	Vigo
	Penev 7'; Mazinho 10'; Penev 15'; Mostovoi 33'; Penev 61'	Report	Morientes 32'	Stadium: Estadio Balaídos; Referee: Jose Sevilla

17 April 1999 30	Real Madrid	3–1	Valencia	Madrid
	Morientes 10'; Raúl 30'; Raúl 71'	Report	Schwarz (yellow card) 32' (yellow-red card); Mendieta 69'	Stadium: Estadio Santiago Bernabéu; Referee: Antonio Nieto

25 April 1999 31	Salamanca	1–1	Real Madrid	Villares de la Reina
	Corino 54'	Report	Raúl 48'	Stadium: Estadio El Helmantico; Referee: Alfonso Burrull

30 April 1999 32	Real Madrid	2–0	Espanyol	Madrid
	Morientes 9', 30'			Stadium: Estadio Santiago Bernabéu; Referee: Juan Roca

7 May 1999 33	Real Sociedad	3–2	Real Madrid	San Sebastián
	Idiakez 32'; De Pedro 44'; Kovacevic 75'	Report	Guti 47'; Savio 52' (pen.)	Stadium: Estadio Anoeta; Referee: Jose García

15 May 1999 34	Real Madrid	2–1	Oviedo	Madrid
	Morientes 37'; Morientes 64'	Report	Dely Valdés 6'	Stadium: Estadio Santiago Bernabéu; Referee: Juan Roca

22 May 1999 35	Tenerife	2–3	Real Madrid	Santa Cruz de Tenerife
	Lodges 49'; Alexis 72'	Report	Morientes 22'; Morientes 32'; Raúl 50' (pen.)	Stadium: Estadio Heliodoro Rodriguez; Referee: Julian Santiago

30 May 1999 36	Real Madrid	2–1	Mallorca	Madrid
	Morientes 31'; Morientes 87'; Panucci (yellow card); Hierro (yellow card); Roberto Carlos (yellow card); Sanchís (yellow card)	Report	Dani 89'; Engonga (yellow card) 88' (yellow-red card); Marcelino (yellow card)	Stadium: Estadio Santiago Bernabéu; Referee: Eduardo Gonzalez

11 June 1999 37	Atlético Madrid	3–1	Real Madrid	Madrid
	José Mari 7'; Lardin 44'; Juninho 75'; Bejbl (yellow card); Serena (yellow card); Molina (yellow card); Muñoz (yellow card)	Report	Morientes 28'; Raúl (yellow card); Jaime (yellow card); Sanchís (yellow card)	Stadium: Estadio Vicente Calderón; Referee: José Grimal

19 June 1999 38	Real Madrid	3–1	Deportivo La Coruña	Madrid
	Raúl 36'; Raúl 44'; Morientes 46'	Report	Turu Flores 63'; Schurrer (red card)	Stadium: Estadio Santiago Bernabéu; Referee: Juan Marin

=== Copa del Rey ===
==== Round of 16 ====
21 January 1999	Real Madrid	2–0	Villarreal	Madrid
	Morientes 60', 90'			Stadium: Santiago Bernabéu; Referee: Manuel Mejuto González

3 February 1999	Villarreal	0–2	Real Madrid	Villarreal
			Morientes 14', 36'	Stadium: El Madrigal; Referee: Miguel Angel Pérez Lasa

==== Quarter-finals ====
17 February 1999	Racing Santander	2–6	Real Madrid	Santander
	Víctor 10' (pen.); Munitis 14'		Guti 6', 45'; Hierro 31' (pen.); Seedorf 36'; Sávio 40'; Morientes 91'	Stadium: El Sardinero; Referee: Juan Manuel Brito Arceo

23 February 1999	Real Madrid	1–0	Racing Santander	Madrid
	Mijatović 74'			Stadium: Santiago Bernabéu; Attendance: 2,000; Referee: Juan Antonio Fernández Marín

==== Semi-finals ====
9 June 1999	Valencia	6–0	Real Madrid	Valencia
	Lopez 19', 54'; Roche 31', 42'; Vlaović 34'; Mendieta 72'			Stadium: Mestalla; Referee: Antonio Jesús López Nieto

16 June 1999	Real Madrid	2–1	Valencia	Madrid
	Morientes 6'; Mijatović 63' (pen.)		Lopez 89'	Stadium: Santiago Bernabéu; Referee: Manuel Díaz Vega

=== UEFA Champions League ===
==== Group stage ====
Pos	Team	Pld	W	D	L	GF	GA	GD	Pts	Qualification	INT	RMA	SPM	STM
1	(Italy) Internazionale	6	4	1	1	9	5	+4	13	Advance to knockout stage	—	3–1	2–1	1–0
2	(Spain) Real Madrid	6	4	0	2	17	8	+9	12	Advance to knockout stage	2–0	—	2–1	6–1
3	(Russia) Spartak Moscow	6	2	2	2	7	6	+1	8		1–1	2–1	—	0–0
4	(Austria) Sturm Graz	6	0	1	5	2	16	−14	1		0–2	1–5	0–2	—

Source: UEFA
- Group C

===== Matches =====
16 September 1998 1	Real Madrid (Spain)	2–0	(Italy) Inter Milan	Seville
	Hierro 80' (pen.); Seedorf 90'	Report		Stadium: Estadio Ramón Sánchez Pizjuán; Attendance: 40,000; Referee: Hugh Dallas

30 September 1998 2	Spartak Moscow (Russia)	2–1	(Spain) Real Madrid	Moscow
	Tsymbalar 72'; Titov 78'	Report	63' Raúl	Stadium: Luzhniki; Attendance: 62,000; Referee: Bernd Heynemann

21 October 1998 3	Real Madrid (Spain)	6–1	(Austria) Sturm Graz	Madrid
	Sávio 13', 90'; Raúl 22'; Jarni 61', 79'; Popović 67' (o.g.)	Report	Vastić 8'	Stadium: Santiago Bernabeu; Attendance: 30,000; Referee: Graham Barber

5 November 1998 4	Sturm Graz (Austria)	1–5	(Spain) Real Madrid	Graz
	Haas 3'	Report	8', 61' Panucci; 35' Mijatović; 57' Seedorf; 74' Šuker	Stadium: Arnold Schwarzenegger-Stadion; Attendance: 15,000; Referee: Karl-Erik Nilsson

25 November 1998 5	Inter Milan (Italy)	3–1	(Spain) Real Madrid	Milan
	Zamorano 51'; Baggio 86'; Baggio 90'	Report	57' Seedorf	Stadium: San Siro; Attendance: 77,820; Referee: Markus Merk

9 December 1998 6	Real Madrid (Spain)	2–1	(Russia) Spartak Moscow	Madrid
	Raúl 34'; Sávio 66'	Report	Khlestov 89'	Stadium: Santiago Bernabeu; Attendance: 70,000; Referee: László Vagner

==== Quarter-finals ====
3 March 1999 1	Real Madrid (Spain)	1–1	(Ukraine) Dynamo Kyiv	Madrid
	Mijatović 66'	Report	54' Shevchenko	Stadium: Santiago Bernabeu; Attendance: 35,183; Referee: Stefano Braschi

17 March 1999 2	Dynamo Kyiv (Ukraine)	2–0	(Spain) Real Madrid	Kyiv
	Shevchenko 62'; Shevchenko 79'	Report		Stadium: Olympic Stadium; Attendance: 81,500; Referee: Anders Frisk

=== UEFA Super Cup ===
28 August 1998 Final	Chelsea (England)	1–0	(Spain) Real Madrid	Monaco
20:45 CET	Poyet 82'	Report		Stadium: Stade Louis II; Attendance: 11,589; Referee: Marc Batta (France)

=== Intercontinental Cup ===
1 December 1998 Final	Real Madrid (Spain)	2–1	(Brazil) Vasco da Gama	Tokyo, Japan
19:00 JST	Nasa 25' (o.g.); Raúl 83'	Report	Juninho 56'	Stadium: National Stadium; Attendance: 51,574; Referee: Mario Sánchez (Chile)

== Statistics ==
=== Player statistics ===
No.	Pos	Nat	Player	Total		La Liga		Copa del Rey		UEFA Champions League	
No.	Pos	Nat	Player	Apps	Goals	Apps	Goals	Apps	Goals	Apps	Goals
1	GK	(Germany) GER	Illgner	45	-73	34	-56	3	-6	8	-11
2	DF	(Italy) ITA	Panucci	40	2	31	0	2	0	7	2
4	DF	(Spain) ESP	Hierro	38	8	28	6	3	1	7	1
5	DF	(Spain) ESP	Sanchís	44	0	27+6	0	4	0	7	0
3	DF	(Brazil) BRA	Roberto Carlos	47	5	35	5	4	0	8	0
10	MF	(Netherlands) NED	Seedorf	50	7	35+2	3	5	1	8	3
6	MF	(Argentina) ARG	Redondo	32	0	23	0	2	0	7	0
11	MF	(Brazil) BRA	Savio	47	10	24+10	6	5+1	1	6+1	3
8	FW	(Federal Republic of Yugoslavia) YUG	Mijatović	39	9	26+2	5	3+1	2	7	2
15	FW	(Spain) ESP	Morientes	42	25	24+9	19	3+2	6	3+1	0
7	FW	(Spain) ESP	Rául	47	28	37	25	2	0	8	3
13	GK	(Spain) ESP	Contreras	7	-9	4	-6	3	-3	0	0
12	DF	(Spain) ESP	Iván Campo	36	1	24+3	1	4+1	0	3+1	0
17	DF	(Croatia) CRO	Jarni	34	3	19+8	1	2	0	3+2	2
14	MF	(Spain) ESP	Guti	36	3	11+17	1	4	2	1+3	0
22	MF	(France) FRA	Karembeu	30	0	12+8	0	5	0	2+3	0
25	GK	(Spain) ESP	Almansa	0	0	0	0	0	0	0	0
9	FW	(Croatia) CRO	Šuker	26	4	9+10	4	1+1	0	0+5	0
16	MF	(Spain) ESP	Jaime	23	0	5+9	0	4+2	0	1+2	0
19	DF	(Spain) ESP	Sanz	12	0	6+3	0	0+1	0	2	0
18	DF	(Spain) ESP	Karanka	7	0	3+1	0	2+1	0	0	0
21	DF	(Spain) ESP	Rojas	10	0	1+4	0	2+3	0	0	0
23	FW	(Cameroon) CMR	Eto'o	1	0	0+1	0	0	0	0	0
29	DF	(Spain) ESP	Tena	3	0	0+1	0	1+1	0	0	0
20	FW	(Federal Republic of Yugoslavia) YUG	Ognjenovic	3	0	0+1	0	0+2	0	0	0
31	FW	(Spain) ESP	Tote	1	0	0+1	0	0	0	0	0
32	FW	(Spain) ESP	Rubio	1	0	0	0	1	0	0	0
27	DF	(Spain) ESP	Dorado	1	0	0	0	1	0	0	0
24	FW	(Spain) ESP	Alvaro	0	0	0	0	0	0	0	0
31	FW	(Spain) ESP	Villa	0	0	0	0	0	0	0	0
25	GK	(Argentina) ARG	Bizzarri	0	0	0	0	0	0	0	0
28	GK	(Spain) ESP	Casillas	0	0	0	0	0	0	0	0

- Source: https://www.bdfutbol.com/en/t/t1998-992.html
