= 1997–98 Real Madrid CF season =

96th season in existence of Real Madrid CF

Real Madrid
1997–98 season
- President: Lorenzo Sanz
- Head coach: Jupp Heynckes
- Stadium: Santiago Bernabéu
- La Liga: 4th
- Copa del Rey: Round of 16
- Supercopa de España: Winners
- UEFA Champions League: Winners
- Top goalscorer: League: Fernando Morientes (12); All: Fernando Morientes (16)
Home colours	Away colours	Third colours

The 1997–98 season was the 96th season in Real Madrid CF's history and their 67th consecutive season in La Liga.

Real Madrid failed to retain their La Liga title, but made up for the domestic disappointment by winning the UEFA Champions League with a 1–0 victory over Juventus in the Amsterdam final. The European Cup title was Real Madrid's 7th overall and first since 1966. This, however, was not enough to save the job of manager Jupp Heynckes, who was sacked due to Madrid's low league finish just eight days after the European triumph. In the Copa del Rey, Real lost to Alaves in the round of 16 on away goals.

== Kit ==
Real Madrid's kits were manufactured by Spanish apparel manufacturer Kelme and sponsored by Teka.

== Squad ==
Squad at end of season

Note: Flags indicate national team as defined under FIFA eligibility rules; some limited exceptions apply. Players may hold more than one non-FIFA nationality.

No.	Pos.	Nation	Player
1	GK	ESP	Santiago Cañizares
2	DF	ESP	Chendo
3	DF	BRA	Roberto Carlos
4	DF	ESP	Fernando Hierro
5	DF	ESP	Manolo Sanchís (captain)
6	MF	ARG	Fernando Redondo
7	FW	ESP	Raúl
8	FW	YUG	Predrag Mijatović
9	FW	CRO	Davor Šuker
10	MF	NED	Clarence Seedorf
11	MF	ESP	José Amavisca
12	FW	ESP	Manuel Canabal
13	GK	ESP	Pedro Contreras
14	MF	ESP	Guti

No.	Pos.	Nation	Player
15	FW	ESP	Fernando Morientes
16	MF	ESP	Jaime
17	DF	ITA	Christian Panucci
18	MF	ESP	Víctor
19	DF	ESP	Fernando Sanz
20	MF	BRA	Sávio
21	MF	BRA	Zé Roberto
22	MF	FRA	Christian Karembeu
23	FW	ESP	Dani
24	DF	ESP	Aitor Karanka
25	GK	GER	Bodo Illgner
26	MF	ESP	Álvaro Benito
27	DF	ESP	Roberto Rojas
28	DF	ESP	Raúl Pareja

=== Transfers ===
In
Pos.	Name	from	Type
FW	Fernando Morientes	Real Zaragoza	
MF	Jaime	Racing Santander	loan ended
FW	Dani García	Real Zaragoza	loan ended
DF	Aitor Karanka	Athletic Bilbao	
GK	Pedro Contreras	Rayo Vallecano	loan ended

Out
Pos.	Name	To	Type
DF	Rafael Alkorta	Athletic Bilbao	
GK	Paco Buyo		retired
MF	Luis Milla	Valencia CF	
DF	Mikel Lasa	Athletic Bilbao	
FW	Dejan Petkovic	EC Vitoria	

==== Winter ====
In
Pos.	Name	from	Type
MF	Christian Karembeu	Sampdoria	
MF	Sávio	Flamengo	
DF	Roberto Rojas		

Out
Pos.	Name	To	Type
FW	Manuel Canabal	Valladolid	loan
MF	Zé Roberto	Flamengo	loan
MF	Álvaro Benito	Tenerife	loan
DF	Carlos Secretario	Porto	

== Competitions ==
=== La Liga ===
==== League table ====
Pos	Team	Pld	W	D	L	GF	GA	GD	Pts	Qualification or relegation
2	Athletic Bilbao	38	17	14	7	52	42	+10	65	Qualification for the Champions League second qualifying round
3	Real Sociedad	38	16	15	7	60	37	+23	63 (Note: RMA 2–0 RSO; RSO 4–2 RMA)	Qualification for the UEFA Cup first round
4	Real Madrid	38	17	12	9	63	45	+18	63	Qualification for the Champions League group stage (Note: Real Madrid was qualified directly for the 1998–99 UEFA Champions League as holders.)
5	Mallorca	38	16	12	10	55	39	+16	60 (Note: MLL: 9 pts; CEL: 5 pts; ATM: 2 pts)	Qualification for the Cup Winners' Cup first round (Note: Since Barcelona, winners of 1997–98 Copa del Rey, was qualified for the 1998–99 UEFA Champions League, losing cup finalists RCD Mallorca earned a spot in the first round of the 1998–99 UEFA Cup Winners' Cup.)
6	Celta Vigo	38	17	9	12	54	47	+7	60	Qualification for the UEFA Cup first round

Source: LFP
Rules for classification: 1) points; 2) head-to-head points; 3) head-to-head goal difference; 4) head-to-head goals scored; 5) goal difference; 6) number of goals scored.

==== Results by round ====
Round	1	2	3	4	5	6	7	8	9	10	11	12	13	14	15	16	17	18	19	20	21	22	23	24	25	26	27	28	29	30	31	32	33	34	35	36	37	38
Ground	A	H	A	H	A	H	A	H	H	A	H	A	H	A	H	A	A	H	A	H	A	H	A	H	H	A	A	H	A	H	A	H	H	A	H	A	H	A
Result	D	W	W	W	D	W	W	D	L	W	W	W	D	W	D	W	D	W	L	D	W	L	L	D	W	L	W	L	D	W	D	D	L	W	D	L	L	W
Position	10	7	3	3	4	2	2	2	3	2	2	2	1	1	2	2	2	2	2	2	2	2	2	2	2	2	2	2	2	2	2	2	2	2	3	4	4	4

Source: Competitive matches
A = Away; H = Home; W = Win; D = Draw; L = Loss; = Leader, 1998–99 UEFA Champions League Group stage; = 1998–99 UEFA Champions League Second qualifying round; = 1998–99 UEFA Cup First round; = Qualification for the Intertoto Cup third round; = Qualification for the Intertoto Cup second round; = 1998–99 Segunda División

==== Matches ====
30 August 1997 1	Real Madrid	1–1	Atlético Madrid	Madrid
	Seedorf 75'; Jaime (yellow card)	Report	Juninho 15'; Geli (yellow card)	Stadium: Estadio Santiago Bernabéu; Referee: Juan Archeo

7 September 1997 2	UD Salamanca	0–2	Real Madrid	Villares de la Reina
	Giovanella (yellow card)	Report	Morientes 10'; Morientes 21'; Roberto Carlos (yellow card); Jaime (yellow card)	Stadium: Estadio El Helmantico; Referee: José Sevilla

14 September 1997 3	Real Madrid	2–0	Real Sociedad	Madrid
	Šuker 28'; Raúl 55'; Hierro (yellow card)	Report	Gómez (yellow card); Ilguasil (yellow card); Idiaquez (yellow card)	Stadium: Estadio Santiago Bernabéu; Referee: José García

28 September 1997 4	Valencia CF	0–2	Real Madrid	Valencia
	Navarro (yellow card) 50' (yellow-red card); Angloma (yellow card); Luis Milla (yellow card); Ortega (yellow card)	Report	Raúl 69' (yellow card); Mijatović 79' (yellow card); Panucci (yellow card); Karanka (yellow card)	Stadium: Estadio Mestalla; Referee: Miguel Lasa

5 October 1997 5	Real Madrid	0–0	Deportivo La Coruña	Madrid
	Seedorf (yellow card); Roberto Carlos (yellow card); Aitor Karanka (yellow card)	Report	Luisao (yellow card); Jemez (yellow card); Naybet (yellow card); Songo'o (yellow card); Santaelena (yellow card)	Stadium: Estadio Santiago Bernabéu; Referee: Manuel Vega

15 October 1997 6	Sporting Gijón	0–2	Real Madrid	Gijón
	Banjo (yellow card); Kotelo (yellow card); Manuel (yellow card); Díaz (yellow card)	Report	Morientes 18'; Rául 76'; Redondo (yellow card)	Stadium: Estadio El Molinón; Referee: José Fuente

18 October 1997 7	Real Madrid	3–0	CD Tenerife	Madrid
	Morientes 8'; Mijatovic 75'; Seedorf 85'; Jaime (yellow card)	Report	Wirklau (yellow card); Mata (yellow card); Vivar-Dorado (yellow card)	Stadium: Estadio Santiago Bernabéu; Referee: Evaristo Leira

27 October 1997 8	RCD Mallorca	0–0	Real Madrid	Palma de Mallorca
	Sierra (yellow card); Amato (yellow card)	Report	Víctor (yellow card); Jaime (yellow card)	Stadium: Estadio Lluis Sitjar; Referee: José Azurmendi

1 November 1997 9	Real Madrid	2–3	FC Barcelona	Madrid
	Raúl 48'; Šuker 61'; Hierro (yellow card); Redondo (yellow card)	Report	Rivaldo 5'; Luis Enrique 50'; Giovanni 79'; Sergi (yellow card); Couto (yellow card)	Stadium: Estadio Santiago Bernabéu; Referee: Juan Roca

8 November 1997 10	Racing Santander	1–2	Real Madrid	Santander
	Correa 80'; Merino (yellow card); Lopez (yellow card); Porfirio (yellow card)	Report	Morientes 47'; Seedorf 76'; Guti (yellow card); Redondo (yellow card); Jaime (yellow card); Roberto Carlos (yellow card)	Stadium: Estadio El Sardinero; Referee: Selino Redondo

12 November 1997 11	SD Compostela	2–3	Real Madrid	Santiago de Compostela
	Bellido 62'; Penev 72'	Report	Morientes 41'; Morientes 58'; Mijatović 66'	Stadium: San Lázaro; Referee: Carmelo Martel

17 November 1997 12	Real Madrid	3–1	Real Valladolid	Madrid
	Mijatovic 19'; Hierro 26'; Víctor 74'	Report	Peternac 2'	Stadium: Estadio Santiago Bernabéu; Referee: Fernando Mendez

22 November 1997 13	Athletic Bilbao	1–1	Real Madrid	Bilbao
	Ziganda 1' (yellow card)	Report	Morientes 80'	Stadium: San Mamés; Referee: Juan Marin

30 November 1997 14	Real Madrid	3–1	Celta Vigo	Madrid
	Mijatovic 44'; Raúl 66'; Seedorf 71'	Report	Gudelj 88'	Stadium: Estadio Santiago Bernabéu; Referee: Miguel Lopez

6 December 1997 15	Real Oviedo	1–1	Real Madrid	Oviedo
	González 88'	Report	Raúl 47'	Stadium: Carlos Tartiere; Referee: Evaristo Leira

14 December 1997 16	Real Madrid	1–0	CP Mérida	Madrid
	Šuker 28'; Jaime (yellow card)	Report		Stadium: Estadio Santiago Bernabéu

17 December 1997 17	Real Zaragoza	2–2	Real Madrid	Zaragoza
	Sandgren 44'; Acuña 52'	Report	Raúl 2'; Guti 21'	Stadium: La Romareda; Referee: Alfonso Burrull

21 December 1997 18	Real Madrid	2–1	RCD Espanyol	Madrid
	Šuker 17'; Šuker 71'	Report	Paaceta 14'	Stadium: Estadio Santiago Bernabéu; Referee: Selino Redondo

3 January 1998 19	Real Betis	3–2	Real Madrid	Sevilla
	Jarni 11'; Jesús 46'; Vidaković 61'	Report	Roberto Carlos 24'; Raúl 50'	Stadium: Estadio Benito Villamarin; Referee: Juan Archeo

10 January 1998 20	Atlético Madrid	1–1	Real Madrid	Madrid
	José Mari 86'	Report	Savio 68'	Stadium: Estadio Vicente Calderón; Referee: Jose Omar

18 January 1998 21	Real Madrid	1–0	UD Salamanca	Madrid
	Panucci 20'	Report		Stadium: Estadio Santiago Bernabéu; Referee: Evaristo Leira

25 January 1998 22	Real Sociedad	4–2	Real Madrid	San Sebastián
	Kuhbauer 24'; Kovačević 38', 46'; Aranzábal 78'	Report	Morientes 5'; Roberto Carlos 50'	Stadium: Anoeta; Referee: Carmelo Martel

2 February 1998 23	Real Madrid	1–2	Valencia CF	Madrid
	Šuker 68' (pen.) (yellow card)	Report	Mendieta 4' (pen.); Ilie 17'	Stadium: Estadio Santiago Bernabéu; Referee: Jose de la Fuente

8 February 1998 24	Deportivo La Coruña	2–2	Real Madrid	A Coruña
	Fran 10'; Djalminha 21'	Report	Víctor 19'; Morientes 78'	Stadium: Estadio Riazor; Referee: Juan Arqueo

15 February 1998 25	Real Madrid	3–0	Sporting Gijón	Madrid
	Savio 51'; Šuker 56'; Šuker 61' (pen.) (yellow card)	Report		Stadium: Estadio Santiago Bernabéu; Referee: Jose Garcia

21 February 1998 26	CD Tenerife	4–3	Real Madrid	Santa Cruz de Tenerife
	Juanele 24' (yellow card) 60' (yellow-red card); Kodro 66' (pen.), 86' (pen.); Makaay 84'	Report	Roberto Carlos 46'; Mijatovic 62' (pen.); Savio 76'	Stadium: Estadio Heliodoro Rodriguez; Referee: Jose Sevilla

28 February 1998 27	Real Madrid	2–0	RCD Mallorca	Madrid
	Roberto Carlos 11'; Mijatovic 32'	Report		Stadium: Estadio Santiago Bernabéu; Referee: Miguel Lasa

7 March 1998 28	FC Barcelona	3–0	Real Madrid	Barcelona
	Anderson 69'; Figo 80'; Giovanni 85'	Report		Stadium: Camp Nou; Referee: Selino Redondo

14 March 1998 29	Real Madrid	2–2	Racing Santander	Madrid
	Mijatovic 30'; Seedorf 49'	Report	Javi Lopez 13'; Beschastnykh 81'	Stadium: Estadio Santiago Bernabéu; Referee: Manuel González

22 March 1998 30	Real Madrid	2–1	SD Compostela	Madrid
	Seedorf 42'; Mijatovic 78'	Report	Penev 11'	Stadium: Estadio Santiago Bernabéu; Referee: Juan Marin

28 March 1998 31	Real Valladolid	1–1	Real Madrid	Valladolid
	Peternac 86'	Report	Suker 34'	Stadium: Estadio José Zorrilla; Referee: Fernando Mendez

4 April 1998 32	Real Madrid	0–0	Athletic Bilbao	Madrid
		Report		Stadium: Estadio Santiago Bernabéu; Referee: Juan Roca

11 April 1998 33	Celta Vigo	2–1	Real Madrid	Vigo
	Mostovoi 37', 56' (pen.)	Report	Hierro 44' (pen.)	Stadium: Estadio Balaídos; Referee: Eduardo Gonzalez

19 April 1998 34	Real Madrid	5–1	Real Oviedo	Madrid
	Morientes 15'; Morientes 73'; Raúl 40'; Raúl 83'; Sanchís 51'	Report	Dely Valdés 62'	Stadium: Estadio Santiago Bernabéu; Referee: Arturo Ibanez

26 April 1998 35	CP Mérida	2–2	Real Madrid	Mérida
	Jose Sinval 62'; Sabas 65'	Report	Hierro 60' (pen.) (yellow card); Suker 79'	Stadium: Estadio Romano; Referee: Jose Garcia

4 May 1998 36	Real Madrid	0–2	Real Zaragoza	Madrid
		Report	Jamelli 57'; Gustavo López 79'	Stadium: Estadio Santiago Bernabéu; Referee: Jose Omar

9 May 1998 37	RCD Espanyol	1–0	Real Madrid	Barcelona
	Roberto 72' (yellow card)	Report	Karembeu (yellow card)	Stadium: Estadi Olímpic Lluís Companys; Referee: Alfonso Burrull

15 May 1998 38	Real Madrid	1–0	Real Betis	Madrid
	Mijatović 76'	Report		Stadium: Estadio Santiago Bernabéu; Referee: Jose Azurmendi

=== Copa del Rey ===
==== Round of 16 ====
13 January 1998	Alavés	1–0	Real Madrid	Vitoria-Gasteiz
21:30 CET	Serrano 70'	Report (in Spanish)		Stadium: Mendizorrotza; Attendance: 18,000; Referee: Daudén Ibáñez (Aragon)

21 January 1998	Real Madrid	2–1 (2–2a agg.)	Alavés	Madrid
21:00 CET	Roberto Carlos 13'; Šuker 55'	Report (in Spanish)	Riesco 10'	Stadium: Santiago Bernabéu; Attendance: 35,000; Referee: Andradas Asurmendi (Navarre)

=== Champions League ===
==== Group stage ====
Pos	Team	Pld	W	D	L	GF	GA	GD	Pts	Qualification	RMA	ROS	OLY	POR
1	(Spain) Real Madrid	6	4	1	1	15	4	+11	13	Advance to knockout stage	—	4–1	5–1	4–0
2	(Norway) Rosenborg	6	3	2	1	13	8	+5	11		2–0	—	5–1	2–0
3	(Greece) Olympiacos	6	1	2	3	6	14	−8	5		0–0	2–2	—	1–0
4	(Portugal) Porto	6	1	1	4	3	11	−8	4		0–2	1–1	2–1	—

Source: UEFA

===== Matches =====
17 September 1997 1	Real Madrid (Spain)	4–1	(Norway) Rosenborg	Madrid
	Panucci 7'; Zé Roberto 39'; Raúl 43'; Morientes 83'	Report	Jakobsen 22'	Stadium: Santiago Bernabéu Stadium; Attendance: 53,000; Referee: Gilles Veissière (France)

1 October 1997 2	Porto (Portugal)	0–2	(Spain) Real Madrid	Porto
		Report	Hierro 14'; Raúl 78'	Stadium: Antas; Attendance: 40,000; Referee: Piero Ceccarini (Italy)

22 October 1997 3	Real Madrid (Spain)	5–1	(Greece) Olympiacos	Madrid
	Šuker 34', 66'; Morientes 44'; Víctor 85'; Roberto Carlos 90'	Report	Dabizas 18'	Stadium: Santiago Bernabéu Stadium; Attendance: 48,000; Referee: Pierluigi Collina (Italy)

5 November 1997 4	Olympiacos (Greece)	0–0	(Spain) Real Madrid	Athens
		Report		Stadium: OAKA Spiridon Louis; Attendance: 55,000; Referee: Hellmut Krug (Germany)

27 November 1997 5	Rosenborg (Norway)	2–0	(Spain) Real Madrid	Trondheim
	Strand 42'; Brattbakk 53'	Report		Stadium: Lerkendal; Attendance: 19,900; Referee: Paul Durkin (England)

10 December 1997 6	Real Madrid (Spain)	4–0	(Portugal) Porto	Madrid
	Hierro 5'; Šuker 29', 73'; Roberto Carlos 40'	Report		Stadium: Santiago Bernabéu Stadium; Attendance: 45,000; Referee: Pierluigi Pairetto (Italy)

==== Quarter-finals ====
4 March 1998	Bayer Leverkusen (Germany)	1–1	(Spain) Real Madrid	Ulrich-Haberland-Stadion, Leverkusen
	Beinlich 18'	Report	Karembeu 74'	Attendance: 38,000; Referee: Kim Milton Nielsen (Denmark)

18 March 1998	Real Madrid (Spain)	3–0	(Germany) Bayer Leverkusen	Santiago Bernabéu Stadium, Madrid
	Karembeu 50'; Morientes 57'; Hierro 90' (pen.)	Report		Attendance: 70,000; Referee: Nikolai Levnikov (Russia)

==== Semi-finals ====
1 April 1998	Real Madrid (Spain)	2–0	(Germany) Borussia Dortmund	Santiago Bernabéu, Madrid
	Morientes 25'; Karembeu 67'	Report		Attendance: 85,000; Referee: Mario van der Ende (Netherlands)

15 April 1998	Borussia Dortmund (Germany)	0–0	(Spain) Real Madrid	Westfalenstadion, Dortmund
		Report		Attendance: 48,500; Referee: Paul Durkin (England)

==== Final ====
20 May 1998	Juventus (Italy)	0–1	(Spain) Real Madrid	Amsterdam Arena, Amsterdam
20:45		Report	Mijatović 66'	Attendance: 48,500; Referee: Hellmut Krug (Germany)

=== Supercopa ===
20 August 1997	Barcelona	2–1	Real Madrid	Barcelona
22:00 CET	Nadal 11'; Giovanni 85' (pen.)		Raúl 5'	Stadium: Camp Nou; Attendance: 120,000; Referee: Gracia Redondo

23 August 1997	Real Madrid	4–1	Barcelona	Madrid
22:00 CET	Raúl 42', 54'; Mijatović 58'; Seedorf 65'		80' Giovanni	Stadium: Santiago Bernabéu; Attendance: 70,000; Referee: Dauden Ibáñez

== Statistics ==
=== Players statistics ===
No.	Pos	Nat	Player	Total		La Liga		Copa del Rey		Champions League	
No.	Pos	Nat	Player	Apps	Goals	Apps	Goals	Apps	Goals	Apps	Goals
1	GK	(Spain) ESP	Cañizares	32	-34	26	-30	0	0	6	-4
17	DF	(Italy) ITA	Panucci	32	2	23	1	1	0	8	1
5	DF	(Spain) ESP	Sanchís	42	1	31	1	0+1	0	9+1	0
4	DF	(Spain) ESP	Hierro	39	6	28	3	1	0	10	3
3	DF	(Brazil) BRA	Roberto Carlos	45	7	35	4	1	1	9	2
16	MF	(Spain) ESP	Jaime	41	0	21+10	0	0+1	0	2+7	0
6	MF	(Argentina) ARG	Redondo	46	0	31+2	0	2	0	10+1	0
10	MF	(Netherlands) NED	Seedorf	47	6	34+2	6	0	0	11	0
8	FW	(Federal Republic of Yugoslavia) YUG	Mijatovic	32	11	22+2	10	0	0	8	1
15	FW	(Spain) ESP	Morientes	45	16	17+16	12	2	0	6+4	4
7	FW	(Spain) ESP	Raúl	47	12	35	10	1	0	11	2
25	GK	(Germany) GER	Illgner	19	-18	12	-15	2	-2	5	-1
9	FW	(Croatia) CRO	Suker	37	15	21+8	10	1	1	5+2	4
11	MF	(Spain) ESP	Amavisca	32	0	16+9	0	0	0	3+4	0
24	DF	(Spain) ESP	Karanka	25	0	14+4	0	2	0	4+1	0
22	MF	(France) FRA	Karembeu	23	3	14+2	0	2	0	5	3
18	MF	(Spain) ESP	Víctor Sánchez	37	3	13+15	2	2	0	0+7	1
14	MF	(Spain) ESP	Guti	20	1	11+6	1	0+1	0	0+2	0
20	MF	(Brazil) BRA	Sávio	15	3	4+8	3	1	0	2	0
19	DF	(Spain) ESP	Sanz	10	0	4+3	0	1	0	2	0
21	MF	(Brazil) BRA	Zé Roberto	10	1	4+2	0	0	0	4	1
2	DF	(Spain) ESP	Chendo	6	0	4	0	1	0	1	0
23	FW	(Spain) ESP	Dani	11	0	0+8	0	1+1	0	0+1	0
13	GK	(Spain) ESP	Contreras	0	0	0	0	0	0	0	0
26	FW	(Spain) ESP	Álvaro	1	0	0	0	0+1	0	0	0
27	DF	(Spain) ESP	Rojas	1	0	0	0	1	0	0	0
28	DF	(Spain) ESP	Pareja	0	0	0	0	0	0	0	0

- Source: https://www.bdfutbol.com/en/t/t1997-982.html
