= Pignoise =

Spanish rock band

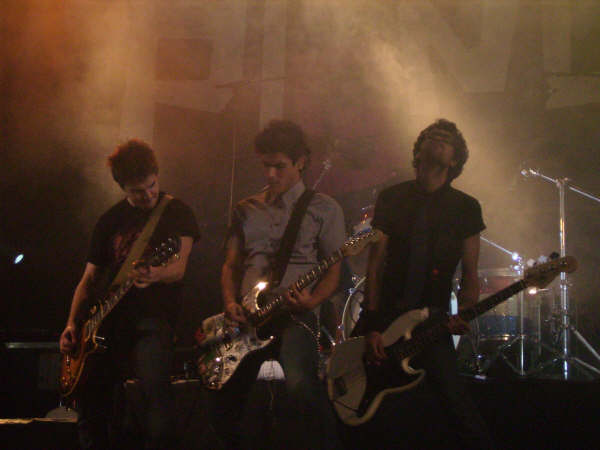

Background information
- Genres: Rock; pop rock; pop punk
- Years active: 2002–present
- Labels: Iuno Records; Warner Dro
- Members: Álvaro Benito; Héctor Polo; Pablo Alonso
- Past members: Jesús Mateos
- Website: Official website

Pignoise is a Spanish rock band comprising three members: Álvaro on guitar and vocals, Polo on drums, and Pablo on bass.

== Beginnings ==
After Álvaro, a former soccer player for teams such as Getafe CF and Real Madrid, suffered a serious injury, he began to play guitar and compose songs during his rehabilitation period. He finally quit football and created a band called PIG NOISE. The group later used many of the songs he composed while in rehabilitation. Later Polo, another former soccer player for Real Zaragoza and other teams, joined the group. The last to join was Pablo, a student who had come from Asturias to Madrid to study theater. Their popularity increased sharply after appearing in a very well known Spanish show, Los hombres de Paco.

During the elections in the Basque Autonomous Community the band played in a meeting created by the conservative Spanish political party Partido Popular. The band has been heavily criticized after that, but during an interview for 20minutos.es, the bandmembers said that they thought it was just an event for young people created by Partido Popular and concluded saying that they'll never play in a political meeting again.

== Musical style and influences ==
Pignoise is described as a pop punk band. Even though they have been seen wearing NOFX shirts in music videos, their light punk rock characteristics and their predominant pop music sound makes them clearly a pop punk band. They may also be considered pop rock or alternative rock. The band cites Ramones, blink-182, Green Day, NoFX, Slick Shoes, Allister and The Offspring as some of their main influences.

== Discography ==
The group has released seven discs. The first two were Melodías Desafinadas (Out-of-tune Melodies) and Esto No Es Un Disco de Punk (This Is Not a Punk Disc). Their third release is titled Anunciado en Televisión (Advertised on Television), which became a hit in Spain and whose first single, "Nada Que Perder" ("Nothing to Lose"), is the theme song of the television series Los Hombres de Paco.

=== Studio albums ===
- Melodias Desafinadas (luno Records) - 2003
- Esto no es un disco de punk (luno Records) - 2005
- Anunciado en televisión (Warner Music Spain) - 2006
- Cuestión de gustos (Warner Music Spain) - 2007
- Año Zero (Sony Music) - 2010
- El tiempo y el espacio (Pignoise Records) - 2013
- Lo que queda por andar (Pignoise Records) - 2015
- Diversión (Pignoise Records) - 2022
- Las Ganas (Acqustic) - 2025

=== Compilations ===
- Cuestión de directo (Warner Music Spain) - 2009

=== EPs ===
- Maqueta (self-released) - 2001
- Pignoise por dentro (Sony Music) - 2011

=== Singles ===
- Nada Que Perder - 2006
- Te Entiendo - 2006
- Sigo llorando por ti - 2006
- Sin ti - 2007
- Sube a mi cohete - 2007
- Pasar de cuartos (created to the Spain national football team) - 2008
- Estoy enfermo (feat. Melendi) - 2009
- Todo me da igual - 2010
- Cama vacía - 2010
- Quiero - 2010
- Bajo tu suela - 2010
- Nubes de algodón - 2011
- La prisión del tiempo - 2011
- La gravedad - 2013
- Prométeme - 2015
- Interrogante - 2017
