= Cilleros =

Coordinates: 40°7′0″N 6°48′0″W

Cilleros, Spain
- municipality
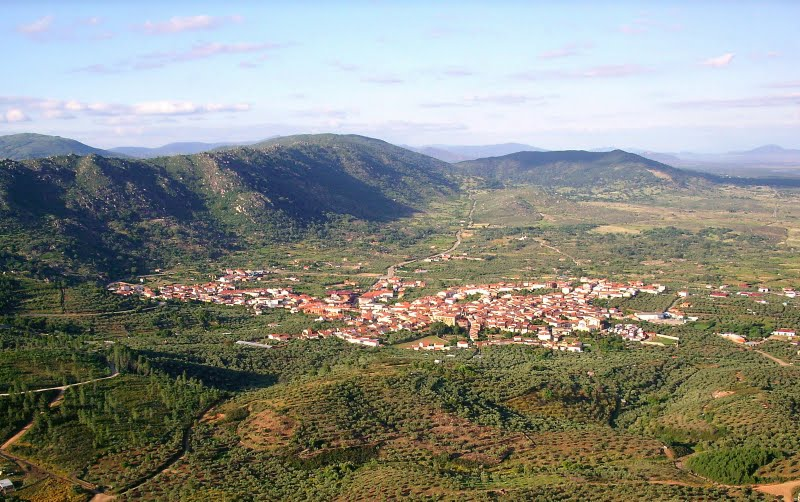
- Panoramic view overlooking Cilleros, Spain

- Coat of arms
- Interactive map of Cilleros, Spain
- Country: Spain
- Autonomous community: Extremadura
- Province: Cáceres
- Municipality: Cilleros

Area
  - Total: 208 km^{2} (80 sq mi)

Population (2025-01-01)
  - Total: 1,547
  - Density: 7.44/km^{2} (19.3/sq mi)
- Time zone: UTC+1 (CET)
  - Summer (DST): UTC+2 (CEST)
- Website: http://www.cilleros.com

Cilleros is a municipality located in the province of Cáceres, Extremadura, Spain. According to the 2006 census (INE), the municipality has a population of 1962 inhabitants. It is the birthplace of Real Madrid footballer, Fernando Morientes.

== See also ==
- List of municipalities in Cáceres
