= Fernando Morientes =

Spanish footballer and manager (born 1976)

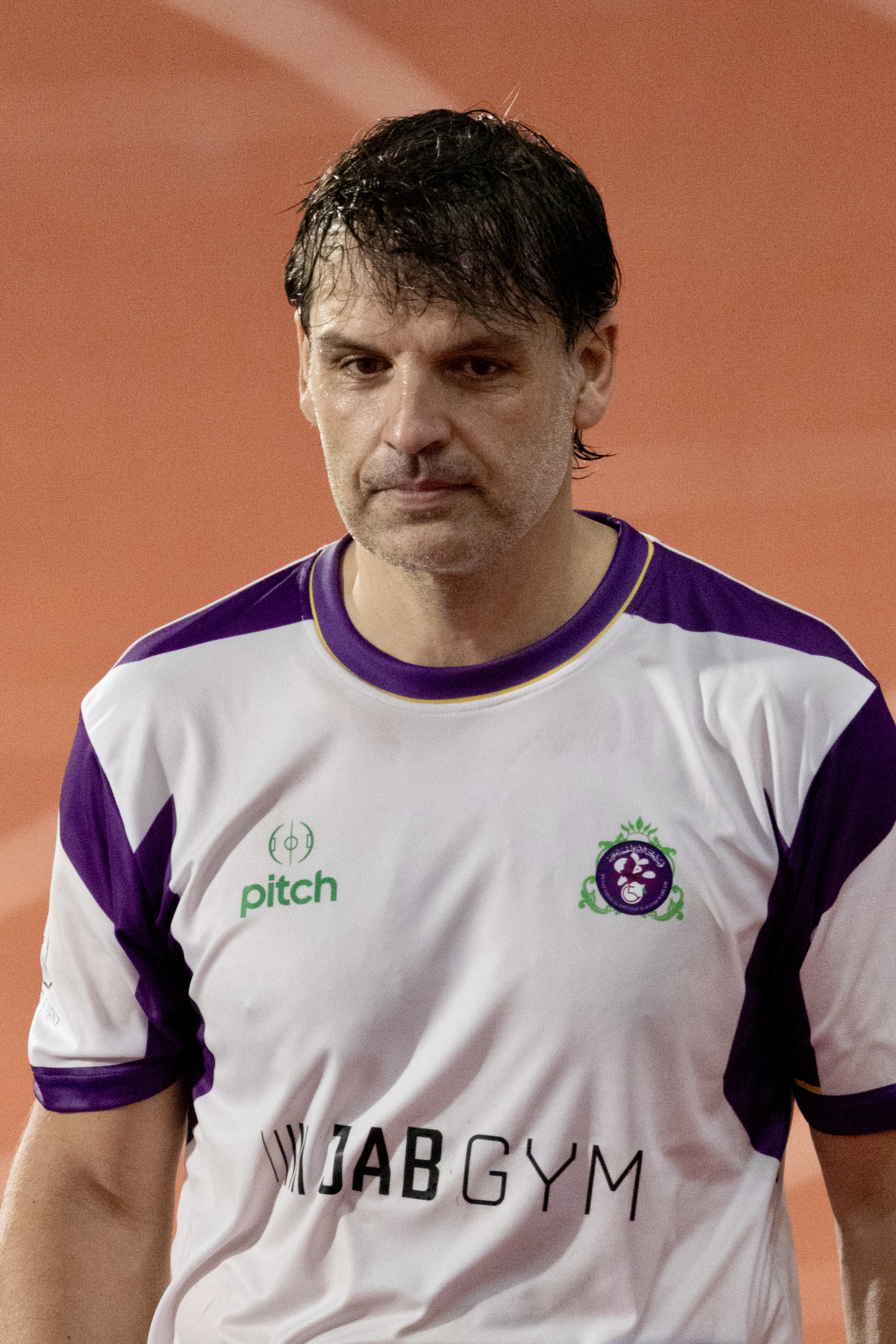
- Morientes in a charity match in 2024

Personal information
- Full name: Fernando Morientes Sánchez
- Date of birth: 5 April 1976 (age 50)
- Place of birth: Cilleros, Spain
- Height: 1.84 m (6 ft 0 in)
- Position: Striker

Youth career
- Sonseca
- 1992–1993: Albacete

Senior career*
Years	Team	Apps	(Gls)
1993–1995	Albacete	22	(5)
1995–1997	Zaragoza	66	(28)
1997–2005	Real Madrid	183	(72)
2003–2004	→ Monaco (loan)	28	(10)
2005–2006	Liverpool	41	(8)
2006–2009	Valencia	66	(19)
2009–2010	Marseille	12	(1)
2015	Santa Ana	3	(0)
Total		421	(143)

International career
1993–1994	Spain U18	12	(10)
1995	Spain U20	5	(1)
1995–1998	Spain U21	16	(4)
1996	Spain U23	2	(0)
1998–2007	Spain	47	(27)

Managerial career
- 2012: Huracán (youth)
- 2012–2014: Real Madrid (youth)
- 2015–2016: Fuenlabrada
Medal record
Representing Spain
UEFA European Under-21 Championship
Winner	1998 Romania
Runner-up	1996 Spain
- * Club domestic league appearances and goals

Fernando Morientes Sánchez (Spanish pronunciation: [feɾˈnando moˈɾjentes ˈsantʃeθ]; born 5 April 1976) is a Spanish former professional footballer who played as a striker.

He played for a number of clubs during his career, including Real Madrid, Monaco, Liverpool and Valencia. In La Liga, he scored 124 goals in 337 games over 15 seasons and started in four Champions League finals between 1998 and 2004. He earned 11 major honours while at Madrid, including three Champions League trophies.

Morientes earned 47 caps for the Spain national team, representing the country in two World Cups (totalling five goals) and Euro 2004. He later worked briefly as a manager.

== Club career ==
=== Early career ===
Morientes was born in Cilleros, Cáceres, Extremadura, and moved to Sonseca in the Province of Toledo at the age of four. He began his professional career at Albacete Balompié, making his La Liga debut on 7 November 1993 as a 75th-minute substitute for Alejandro in a 2–3 loss against CD Tenerife at the Estadio Carlos Belmonte, and he made one more appearance that season, also from the bench.

On 23 October 1994, soon after coming on as a first-half replacement for Alberto Monteagudo, Morientes scored his first professional goal, opening a 2–0 home win over Racing de Santander. He got his first start a week later in a 5–1 loss at RCD Español, and finished the campaign with a total of five goals in 20 league games; additionally, he found the net in each leg of a 3–2 aggregate win over holders Real Zaragoza in the last 16 of the Copa del Rey.

Morientes signed with Zaragoza in 1995, where he spent another two seasons, often being partnered up front by Dani, a Real Madrid youth graduate. He made his debut on 9 September away to Real Betis, scoring the team's goal after 48 minutes but being sent off seven minutes later for striking Jaime. On 10 January of the following year, he scored his first professional hat-trick in a 3–2 win at Athletic Bilbao for the domestic cup; his first such feat in the league followed on 3 February in a 4–1 victory over Valencia CF at La Romareda, and eight days later he scored the first goal at SD Compostela and also received his marching orders with his team winning 2–1 (eventual 3–2 defeat).

=== Real Madrid ===
Morientes's performances for Zaragoza caught the eye of Spanish giants Real Madrid, which bought the player in the summer of 1997 for approximately €6.6 million. Initially backing up established Predrag Mijatović and Davor Šuker, he finished as starter and managed 12 goals in his first year in 33 matches, squad-best (with the two players who fought with him for a starting berth netting ten apiece, as youth system prodigy Raúl); the team finished fourth in the league, but won the season's UEFA Champions League.

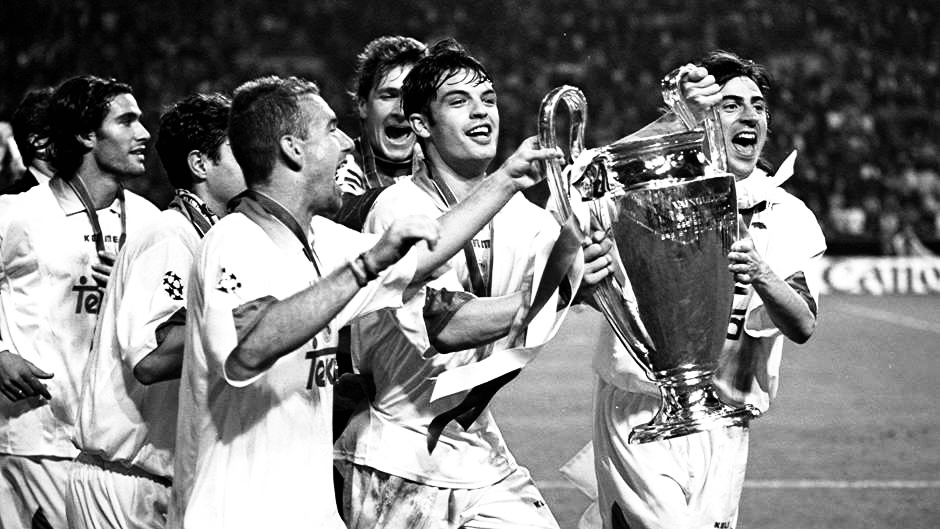
Morientes with Real Madrid holding the 1998 Champions League trophy

Morientes performed very well in the 1998–99 campaign, scoring 19 goals in the league and 25 in 38 appearances overall. He continued to display top football in 1999–2000, netting 19 times and finishing as Real's top scorer in a year where he also helped to the capital side's second Champions League title in three years, scoring in the 3–0 defeat of Valencia CF in an all-Spanish final. In the next season, he won the first of two league titles with the club and netted ten goals overall, including four in eight appearances in the Champions League in a semi-final exit to eventual winners FC Bayern Munich; he missed the last weeks due to injury.

In 2001–02, Real failed to win the league after losing out to Valencia. Morientes continued his scoring form, however, scoring 18 league goals in only 25 starts, with six substitute appearances. He also netted five in a 7–0 demolition of UD Las Palmas, missing out on a double hat-trick after missing from the penalty spot late in the match. He finished second in the top scorers list, tied with Patrick Kluivert and behind Deportivo de La Coruña's Diego Tristán, as the Merengues were successful in winning the Champions League after beating Bayer 04 Leverkusen – he played in the final and received a third winners medal.

In the summer of 2002, Real Madrid signed Brazilian superstar Ronaldo from Inter Milan. This fueled rumours that Morientes would soon be leaving, with FC Barcelona and Tottenham Hotspur reportedly interested – the former were reportedly on the verge of signing the player for around €22 million, but the move fell through due to Barça's reluctance to match his wage demands. Eventually, he decided to stay, but as predicted he did not feature as much after the arrival of Ronaldo, who was preferred in the starting lineup along with Raúl. He eventually fell down the pecking order of strikers to Guti and Javier Portillo and, during a February 2003 home win against Borussia Dortmund – 2–1 in the Champions League second group stage – was involved in a highly publicised spat with manager Vicente del Bosque, with the player allegedly insulting the coach after being called to enter the pitch as a third replacement in the dying minutes; in the winter transfer window, despite continuous rumours of moves to Tottenham, Zaragoza, AS Roma and AC Milan, he remained at the club for remainder of the season as the side went on to win the league, with the player making a total of 19 appearances (with three starts) and scoring five goals.

=== Monaco loan and return ===
At the start of the 2003–04 season, it was evident Morientes was not part of Real's plans. After extensive but ultimately unsuccessful negotiations regarding a loan deal with Germany's FC Schalke 04, he was loaned to Ligue 1 side AS Monaco FC, where he performed very well, netting ten times from 28 appearances in the league. It was in the Champions League, however, that he really made an impact, finishing as top scorer at nine goals: Monaco met Real Madrid in the quarter-finals, where he scored a vital away goal in the first leg (4–2 away loss); in the second match, he again found the net as his team won 3–1, taking the aggregate score to 5–5 (away goals rule victory). He also scored in both games of the last-four win against Chelsea, but could not prevent a 3–0 defeat in the final to FC Porto, played at the Arena AufSchalke in Gelsenkirchen.

After returning to Real Madrid at the start of the 2004–05 campaign, Morientes's hopes of forcing his way into the squad were further dampened with the arrival of Michael Owen from Liverpool. He featured in 13 scoreless league matches (all as a substitute), and was transferred to Liverpool in January 2005 for a fee of €9.3 million. During his time at the Santiago Bernabéu Stadium he played 272 games in all competitions, scoring 100 goals.

=== Liverpool ===
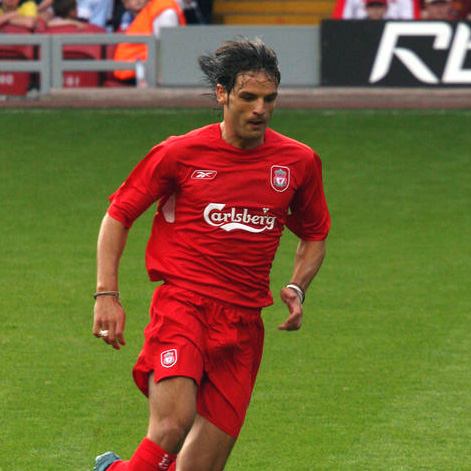
Morientes in action for Liverpool in August 2005

Morientes made his debut for Liverpool on 15 January 2005 against Manchester United, starting in a 0–1 home loss to the rivals – BBC Sport described his performance as "quiet". He scored his first goal for the club on 1 February, equalising with a 20-yard strike in a 2–1 win at Charlton Athletic, and he followed it four days later with his first goal at Anfield to open a 3–1 win over Fulham after nine minutes. He was cup-tied for the Champions League campaign, and did not feature in the victory against Milan in the final of the competition.

On 10 August 2005, Morientes scored in each half of a 3–1 away win against PFC CSKA Sofia in the first leg of the third qualifying round for the season's Champions League. His form in the league was inconsistent, but on 10 December he netted a five-minute brace in a 2–0 home defeat of Middlesbrough, their seventh in a row. On 21 March 2006, he scored in a 7–0 rout of Birmingham City in the quarter-finals of the FA Cup, finishing Steven Gerrard's cross three minutes after entering in place of Peter Crouch. Liverpool went on to win the tournament, and the player replaced Harry Kewell early in the second half of the final against West Ham United.

Morientes totalled 12 goals in 61 appearances, also winning the 2005 UEFA Super Cup and playing on the losing side in the 2005 Football League Cup final and the 2005 FIFA Club World Championship final. He ultimately failed to live up to his reputation.

=== Valencia ===
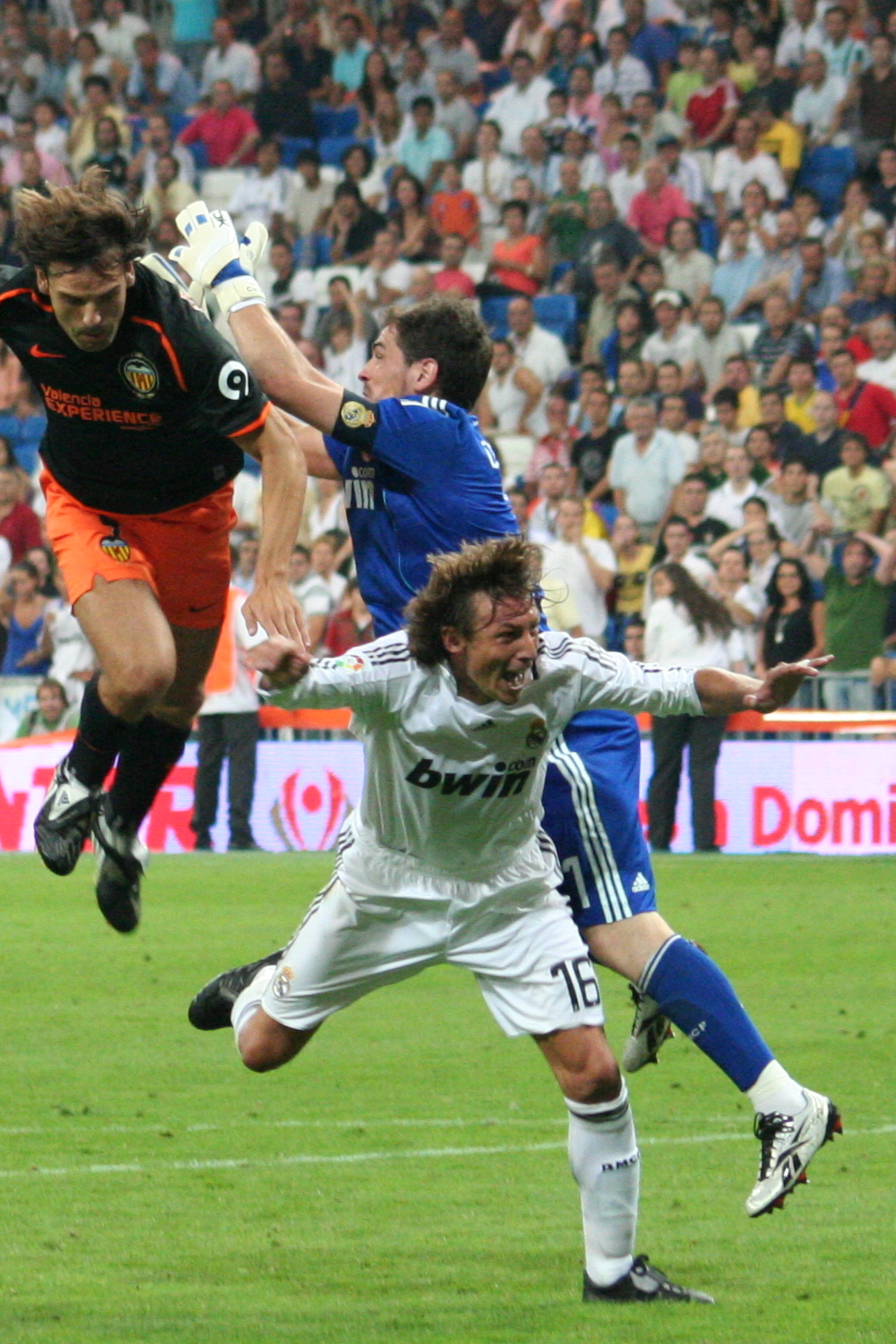
Morientes colliding with Real Madrid's Iker Casillas in the 2008 Supercopa de España

Morientes joined Valencia in late May 2006 for a fee reported to be around £3 million. Here, he started to regain his form, scoring on his league debut – a 2–1 home win against Betis– and also netting a hat-trick in his first Champions League appearance against Olympiacos FC. He linked up well with David Villa and scored 12 goals in 24 games, and was also team-top scorer in the Champions League with seven; his good form throughout the season also earned him a recall to the national side.

For 2007–08, Morientes and Villa were joined in the strike force by Nikola Žigić and Javier Arizmendi. The campaign, however, was disappointing, as the Che were knocked out of the Champions League after finishing fourth in the group, and manager Quique Sánchez Flores was dismissed following a poor run of form. He picked up an injury in December 2007 that ruled him out for almost three months, and he made his return to the side against Sevilla FC on 15 March 2008; he also came off the bench to score the third and final goal in Valencia's 3–1 victory over Getafe CF in the final of the Copa del Rey the following month.

Morientes missed out on a further few league games after he was hospitalised in April with abdominal pains and fever. He was released from hospital in time for the final two matches of the season, but played no part in either.

Having begun the following campaign as an unused substitute in Valencia's first league game, and only coming on from the bench in the second, Morientes was handed his first start in a UEFA Cup match against C.S. Marítimo, and he scored the only goal in Portugal through a solo effort at the 12-minute mark. His increasing age and the form of Villa and Juan Mata, however, led to only a handful of appearances in the league; as they were ousted in the round of 32, he still finished as their top scorer in European competition at three goals in seven matches.

=== Marseille ===
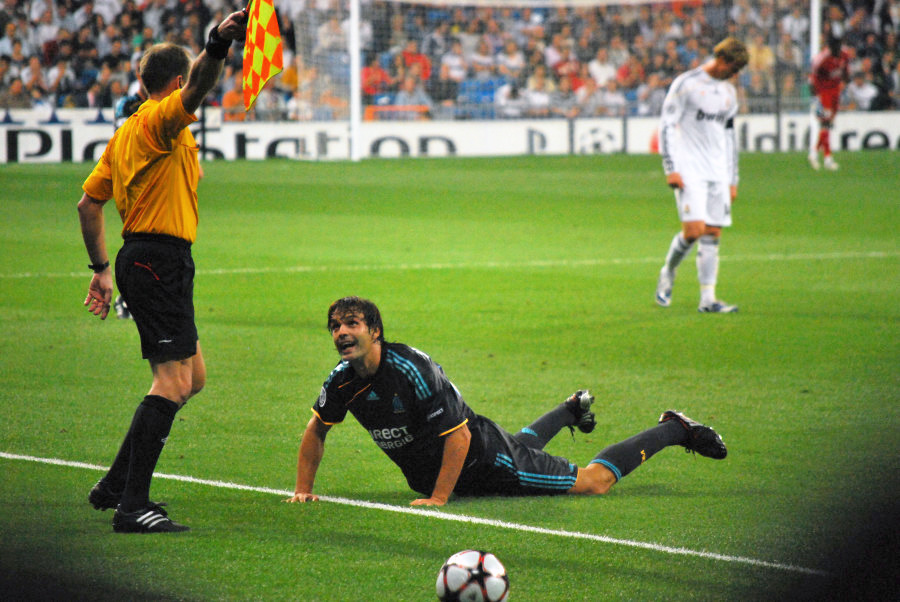
Morientes in a Champions League match against Real Madrid in September 2009

On 27 July 2009, Morientes agreed to a deal at France's Olympique de Marseille on a free transfer for one year, reuniting with former Monaco boss Didier Deschamps. During his only season he was the fourth of five strikers in the squad, his sole Ligue 1 goal coming on 26 September in what his first start, opening a 3–2 loss at Valenciennes FC.

Morientes was released on 1 July 2010, by mutual consent. On 31 August, the 34-year-old announced his retirement from football.

=== Coaching and brief return as player ===
Morientes started his career as manager with Huracán Valencia CF, taking charge of its youth academy. In 2012 he returned to Real Madrid, being appointed at the Juvenil B team in the youth academy.

In January 2015, at 38, Morientes returned to playing, signing with DAV Santa Ana in the Madrid regional championships. In June, he became manager of CF Fuenlabrada, but was sacked the following 17 February with the team 11th in Segunda División B.

== International career ==
Morientes was a reliable performer for the Spain national team since 1998, scoring a brace in the first five minutes of his debut against Sweden on 25 March and adding a further two in each of his next two games, against Northern Ireland and Bulgaria respectively. He ranked fourth on the Spanish all-time topscorer's list with 27 goals in 47 appearances, behind former Real Madrid teammate Raúl, former Valencia teammate Villa and former Madrid captain Fernando Hierro (who took the majority of Spain's free kicks and penalties), although his goals-to-games ratio was higher than Raúl and Hierro.

Morientes netted five goals in the two FIFA World Cups he featured in, with two goals in 1998 and three in 2002. In the latter edition he and Raúl played together up front, and both showed impressive form in the tournament; during the quarter-final match against South Korea the former scored a goal in extra-time that was disallowed, although replays suggested the goal was legitimate – Spain eventually lost the match on penalties.

After being a surprise omission at UEFA Euro 2000, with coach José Antonio Camacho later admitting after being ousted in the quarter-finals that he had made a mistake by picking Ismael Urzaiz instead, Morientes was selected for Euro 2004 in Portugal, where he scored one of only two goals that the side could manage, in a subsequent group-stage exit. He also played for the nation during the 2006 World Cup qualifiers; however, due to his poor club form for Liverpool, he was not chosen by national team coach Luis Aragonés in the final squad for the tournament, although he was part of an initial 31-man list.

Following his return to form after moving to Valencia, Morientes was recalled to the national side. He scored his 27th goal for Spain in a Euro 2008 qualifier against Denmark on 24 March 2007. Injured four days later against Iceland in another qualifying fixture, he was not recalled again.

== Style of play ==
Morientes was regarded one of the top strikers of his generation, forming a notable partnership with Raúl at Real Madrid. He excelled in the air and was an accurate finisher with his head and with his feet, both inside and outside the area; he was also an accurate free kick taker, and was capable of playing off another striker.

In his later career, as he lost his pace, Morientes often played in a supporting role, using his strength and control to hold up the ball for teammates.

== Media ==
Morientes was featured in the EA Sports' FIFA video game series: he was on the cover for the Spanish edition of FIFA 99, and also appeared in FIFA Football 2005.

Morientes competed in the third season of Mask Singer: Adivina quién canta as "Gorila", being declared joint winner with Ana Torroja as "Ratita".

== Personal life ==
Morientes married his childhood sweetheart Victoria López on 23 December 1999, in Toledo. They fathered son Fernando, and daughters Gabriela, Lucía and Martina.

Morientes's nephew Alberto is also a footballer. An attacking midfielder, he also moved from CD Sonseca to Albacete like his uncle, and made his debut with the first team 32 years after Fernando in 2025.

== Career statistics ==
=== Club ===
Appearances and goals by club, season and competition
Club	Season	League			National cup (Note: Includes Copa del Rey, Coupe de France, FA Cup)		League cup (Note: Includes Football League Cup)		Continental		Other		Total	
Club	Season	Division	Apps	Goals	Apps	Goals	Apps	Goals	Apps	Goals	Apps	Goals	Apps	Goals
Albacete	1993–94	La Liga	2	0	2	1	—		0	0	—		4	1
Albacete	1994–95	La Liga	20	5	6	2	—		0	0	1 (Note: Appearance in La Liga relegation play-offs)	0	27	7
Albacete	Total		22	5	8	3	—		0	0	1	0	31	8
Zaragoza	1995–96	La Liga	29	13	3	3	—		5 (Note: Appearances in UEFA Cup Winners' Cup)	2	2 (Note: Appearances in UEFA Super Cup)	0	39	18
Zaragoza	1996–97	La Liga	37	15	3	1	—		–		–		40	16
Zaragoza	Total		66	28	6	4	—		5	2	2	0	79	34
Real Madrid	1997–98	La Liga	33	12	2	0	—		10 (Note: Appearances in UEFA Champions League)	4	–		45	16
Real Madrid	1998–99	La Liga	33	19	5	6	—		4	0	1	0	43	25
Real Madrid	1999–2000	La Liga	29	12	5	0	—		14	6	3 (Note: Appearances in FIFA Club World Cup)	1	51	19
Real Madrid	2000–01	La Liga	22	6	1	0	—		8	4	1 (Note: Appearance in Intercontinental Cup)	0	32	10
Real Madrid	2001–02	La Liga	33	18	5	0	—		11	3	2 (Note: Appearances in Supercopa de España)	0	51	21
Real Madrid	2002–03	La Liga	19	5	2	1	—		7	0	0	0	28	6
Real Madrid	2003–04	La Liga	1	0	0	0	—		0	0	–		1	0
Real Madrid	2004–05	La Liga	13	0	2	1	—		6	2	–		21	3
Real Madrid	Total		183	72	22	8	—		61	19	6	1	272	100
Monaco (loan)	2003–04	Ligue 1	28	10	2	3	0	0	12	9	–		42	22
Liverpool	2004–05	Premier League	13	3	0	0	2	0	—		–		15	3
Liverpool	2005–06	Premier League	28	5	5	1	1	0	10	3	2 (Note: One appearance in UEFA Super Cup, one appearance in FIFA Club World Cup)	0	46	9
Liverpool	Total		41	8	5	1	3	0	10	3	2	0	61	12
Valencia	2006–07	La Liga	24	12	3	0	—		10	7	–		37	19
Valencia	2007–08	La Liga	22	6	1	1	—		8	1	–		31	8
Valencia	2008–09	La Liga	20	1	6	2	—		7 (Note: Appearances in UEFA Cup)	3	1	1	34	7
Valencia	Total		66	19	10	3	—		25	11	1	1	102	34
Marseille	2009–10	Ligue 1	12	1	2	0	0	0	5	0	–		19	1
Santa Ana	2014–15	Preferente	3	0	—		—		—		–		3	0
Career total			421	143	55	22	3	0	115	44	12	2	606	211

=== International ===
Appearances and goals by national team and year
National team	Year	Apps	Goals
Spain	1998	6	7
Spain	1999	6	2
Spain	2000	0	0
Spain	2001	4	3
Spain	2002	11	5
Spain	2003	3	3
Spain	2004	8	4
Spain	2005	4	2
Spain	2006	2	0
Spain	2007	3	1
Total		47	27

Scores and results list Spain's goal tally first, score column indicates score after each Morientes goal.

List of international goals scored by Fernando Morientes
No.	Date	Venue	Opponent	Score	Result	Competition
1	25 March 1998	Balaídos, Vigo, Spain	Sweden	1–0	4–0	Friendly
2	25 March 1998	Balaídos, Vigo, Spain	Sweden	2–0	4–0	Friendly
3	3 June 1998	El Sardinero, Santander, Spain	Northern Ireland	3–1	4–1	Friendly
4	3 June 1998	El Sardinero, Santander, Spain	Northern Ireland	4–1	4–1	Friendly
5	24 June 1998	Félix Bollaert, Lens, France	Bulgaria	3–0	6–1	1998 FIFA World Cup
6	24 June 1998	Félix Bollaert, Lens, France	Bulgaria	4–1	6–1	1998 FIFA World Cup
7	5 September 1998	Antonis Papadopoulos, Larnaca, Cyprus	Cyprus	2–3	2–3	Euro 2000 qualifying
8	18 August 1999	Polish Army, Warsaw, Poland	Poland	1–1	2–1	Friendly
9	10 October 1999	Carlos Belmonte, Albacete, Spain	Israel	1–0	3–0	Euro 2000 qualifying
10	28 March 2001	Mestalla, Valencia, Spain	France	2–0	2–1	Friendly
11	1 September 2001	Mestalla, Valencia, Spain	Austria	2–0	4–1	2002 World Cup qualification
12	1 September 2001	Mestalla, Valencia, Spain	Austria	3–0	4–1	2002 World Cup qualification
13	13 February 2002	Lluís Companys, Barcelona, Spain	Portugal	1–1	1–1	Friendly
14	17 April 2002	Windsor Park, Belfast, Northern Ireland	Northern Ireland	5–0	5–0	Friendly
15	7 June 2002	Jeonju World Cup, Jeonju, South Korea	Paraguay	1–1	3–1	2002 FIFA World Cup
16	7 June 2002	Jeonju World Cup, Jeonju, South Korea	Paraguay	2–1	3–1	2002 FIFA World Cup
17	16 June 2002	Suwon World Cup, Suwon, South Korea	Republic of Ireland	1–0	1–1	2002 FIFA World Cup
18	30 April 2003	Vicente Calderón, Madrid, Spain	Ecuador	2–0	4–0	Friendly
19	30 April 2003	Vicente Calderón, Madrid, Spain	Ecuador	3–0	4–0	Friendly
20	30 April 2003	Vicente Calderón, Madrid, Spain	Ecuador	4–0	4–0	Friendly
21	31 March 2004	El Molinón, Gijón, Spain	Denmark	1–0	2–0	Friendly
22	5 June 2004	Alfonso Pérez, Getafe, Spain	Andorra	1–0	4–0	Friendly
23	16 June 2004	Bessa, Porto, Portugal	Greece	1–0	1–1	UEFA Euro 2004
24	18 August 2004	Gran Canaria, Las Palmas, Spain	Venezuela	1–0	3–2	Friendly
25	3 September 2005	El Sardinero, Santander, Spain	Canada	2–0	2–1	Friendly
26	12 November 2005	Vicente Calderón, Madrid, Spain	Slovakia	5–1	5–1	2006 World Cup qualification
27	24 March 2007	Santiago Bernabéu, Madrid, Spain	Denmark	1–0	2–1	Euro 2008 qualifying

== Honours ==
Real Madrid

- La Liga: 2000–01, 2002–03
- Supercopa de España: 2001
- UEFA Champions League: 1997–98, 1999–2000, 2001–02
- Intercontinental Cup: 1998, 2002

Monaco

- UEFA Champions League runner-up: 2003–04

Liverpool

- FA Cup: 2005–06
- UEFA Super Cup: 2005
- Football League Cup runner-up: 2004–05
- FIFA Club World Championship runner-up: 2005

Valencia

- Copa del Rey: 2007–08

Marseille

- Ligue 1: 2009–10
- Coupe de la Ligue: 2009–10

Spain U21

- UEFA European Under-21 Championship: 1998; runner-up: 1996

Individual

- UEFA Club Forward of the Year: 2003–04
- UEFA Champions League Top Scorer: 2003–04
- Ligue 1 Team of the Year: 2003–04
