= 1997 Supercopa de España =

Barcelona	Real Madrid
3	5
- on aggregate

First leg
Barcelona	Real Madrid
2	1
- Date: 20 August 1997
- Venue: Camp Nou, Barcelona
- Referee: Celino Gracia Redondo
- Attendance: 120,000

Second leg
Real Madrid	Barcelona
4	1
- Date: 23 August 1997
- Venue: Santiago Bernabéu, Madrid
- Referee: Arturo Daudén Ibáñez
- Attendance: 70,000

The 1997 Supercopa de España was a two-leg Spanish football match played on 20 August and 23 August 1997. The contestants were Barcelona, who were Spanish Cup winners in 1996–97, and Real Madrid, who won the 1996–97 Spanish League. Real Madrid won 5–3 on aggregate.

== Match details ==
=== First leg ===
20 August 1997
22:00 CET

Barcelona	2–1	Real Madrid
Nadal 11'; Giovanni 85' (pen.)		Raúl 5'

Camp Nou, Barcelona
Attendance: 120,000
Referee: Gracia Redondo

Barcelona	Real Madrid

GK	13	(Netherlands) Ruud Hesp
RB	22	(Netherlands) Michael Reiziger
CB	20	(Spain) Miguel Ángel Nadal		(substituted off) 66'
LB	12	(Spain) Sergi	(yellow card) 27'
DM	4	(Spain) Pep Guardiola (c)
RM	21	(Spain) Luis Enrique		(substituted off) 62'
LM	18	(Spain) Guillermo Amor
AM	10	(Brazil) Giovanni
RW	11	(Brazil) Rivaldo
CF	9	(Brazil) Sonny Anderson
LW	14	(Nigeria) Emmanuel Amunike		(substituted off) 71'
Substitutes:
GK	25	(Spain) Carles Busquets
DF	2	(Spain) Albert Ferrer		(substituted in) 66'
MF	16	(Federal Republic of Yugoslavia) Dragan Ćirić		(substituted in) 71'
FW	15	(France) Christophe Dugarry		(substituted in) 62'
FW	19	(Argentina) Juan Antonio Pizzi
Manager:
(Netherlands) Louis van Gaal

GK	1	(Spain) Santiago Cañizares
RB	2	(Spain) Chendo
CB	24	(Spain) Aitor Karanka	(yellow card) 84'
CB	5	(Spain) Manolo Sanchís (c)
LB	3	(Brazil) Roberto Carlos	(yellow card) 89'
DM	16	(Spain) Jaime		(substituted off) 62'
RM	10	(Netherlands) Clarence Seedorf		(substituted off) 81'
LM	11	(Spain) José Amavisca		(substituted off) 62'
AM	7	(Spain) Raúl
CF	8	(Federal Republic of Yugoslavia) Predrag Mijatović	(yellow card) 27'
CF	9	(Croatia) Davor Šuker
Substitutes:
GK	13	(Spain) Pedro Contreras
DF	22	(Portugal) Carlos Secretário
MF	14	(Spain) Guti		(substituted in) 62'
MF	21	(Brazil) Zé Roberto		(substituted in) 62'
FW	23	(Spain) Dani		(substituted in) 81'
Manager:
(Germany) Jupp Heynckes

=== Second leg ===
23 August 1997
22:00 CET

Real Madrid	4–1	Barcelona
Raúl 42', 54'; Mijatović 58'; Seedorf 65'		Giovanni 80'

Santiago Bernabéu, Madrid
Attendance: 70,000
Referee: Dauden Ibáñez

Real Madrid	Barcelona

GK	1	(Spain) Santiago Cañizares
RB	17	(Italy) Christian Panucci	(yellow card) 38'
CB	24	(Spain) Aitor Karanka
CB	4	(Spain) Fernando Hierro (c)	(yellow card) 87'
LB	3	(Brazil) Roberto Carlos
DM	14	(Spain) Guti		(substituted off) 63'
RM	10	(Netherlands) Clarence Seedorf	(yellow card) 8'
LM	21	(Brazil) Zé Roberto		(substituted off) 82'
AM	7	(Spain) Raúl	(yellow card) 24'
CF	8	(Federal Republic of Yugoslavia) Predrag Mijatović
CF	9	(Croatia) Davor Šuker		(substituted off) 73'
Substitutes:
MF	16	(Spain) Jaime		(substituted in) 63'
MF	18	(Spain) Víctor		(substituted in) 73'
DF	5	(Spain) Manolo Sanchís		(substituted in) 82'
Manager:
(Germany) Jupp Heynckes

GK	13	(Netherlands) Ruud Hesp
RB	2	(Spain) Albert Ferrer
CB	22	(Netherlands) Michael Reiziger
CB	3	(Spain) Abelardo	(yellow card) 32'
LB	12	(Spain) Sergi
DM	4	(Spain) Pep Guardiola (c)
DM	18	(Spain) Guillermo Amor		(substituted off) 57'
AM	10	(Brazil) Giovanni
RW	7	(Portugal) Luís Figo	(yellow card) 45'
CF	9	(Brazil) Sonny Anderson		(substituted off) 68'
LW	11	(Brazil) Rivaldo
Substitutes:
MF	16	(Federal Republic of Yugoslavia) Dragan Ćirić		(substituted in) 57'
FW	15	(France) Christophe Dugarry		(substituted in) 68'
Manager:
(Netherlands) Louis van Gaal

== See also ==
- El Clásico
- 1997–98 La Liga
- 1997–98 Copa del Rey
- 1997–98 FC Barcelona season
- 1997–98 Real Madrid CF season
