= Raúl Pareja =

Spanish footballer

Personal information
- Full name: Raúl Pareja León
- Date of birth: 12 November 1974 (age 51)
- Place of birth: Palma de Mallorca, Spain
- Height: 1.81 m (5 ft 11 in)
- Position: Midfielder

Senior career*
Years	Team	Apps	(Gls)
1993–1997	Mallorca	53	(3)
1995–1997	Mallorca B	58	(1)
1997–1998	Real Madrid Castilla	29	(1)
1998–2000	Leganés	22	(0)
2002	Orihuela	12	(0)
2003–2004	Cartagena	27	(2)
Total		201	(7)
- * Club domestic league appearances and goals

Raúl Pareja León (born 12 November 1974) is a Spanish former footballer who played as a midfielder.

== Career statistics ==
=== Club ===
Club	Season	League			Cup		Other		Total	
Club	Season	Division	Apps	Goals	Apps	Goals	Apps	Goals	Apps	Goals
Mallorca	1993–94	Segunda División	15	1	0	0	0	0	15	1
Mallorca	1994–95	Segunda División	28	1	4	0	0	0	32	1
Mallorca	1995–96	Segunda División	5	1	3	0	0	0	8	1
Mallorca	1996–97	Segunda División	5	0	1	0	0	0	6	0
Mallorca	Total		53	3	8	0	0	0	61	3
Mallorca B	1995–96	Segunda División B	28	0	–		0	0	28	0
Mallorca B	1996–97	Segunda División B	30	1	–		0	0	30	1
Mallorca B	Total		58	1	0	0	0	0	58	1
Real Madrid Castilla	1997–98	Segunda División B	29	1	–		4 (Note: Appearances in the Segunda División B promotion playoffs)	0	33	1
Leganés	1998–99	Segunda División	14	0	0	0	0	0	14	0
Leganés	1999–00	Segunda División	8	0	2	0	0	0	10	0
Leganés	Total		22	0	2	0	0	0	24	0
Orihuela	2002–03	Segunda División B	12	0	2	0	0	0	14	0
Cartagena	2003–04	Segunda División B	27	2	0	0	0	0	27	2
Career total			201	7	12	0	4	0	217	7
