= Roberto Rojas (Spanish footballer) =

Spanish footballer and manager

Personal information
- Full name: Roberto Rojas González
- Date of birth: 17 November 1974 (age 51)
- Place of birth: Madrid, Spain
- Height: 1.75 m (5 ft 9 in)
- Position: Right back

Team information
- Current team: Real Madrid (youth)

Youth career
- Real Madrid

Senior career*
Years	Team	Apps	(Gls)
1994–1995	Real Madrid C	31	(3)
1995–1998	Real Madrid B	67	(1)
1998–1999	Real Madrid	5	(0)
1999–2004	Málaga	94	(0)
2004–2005	Rayo Vallecano	22	(0)
2005–2006	Alcorcón	24	(0)
2006–2007	Parla		
Total		243	(4)

Managerial career
- 2009–2010: Real Madrid (Infantil A assistant)
- 2010–2011: Real Madrid (Cadete B assistant)
- 2011–: Real Madrid (Infantil A)
- * Club domestic league appearances and goals

Roberto Rojas González (born 17 November 1974 in Madrid) is a Spanish retired footballer who played as a right back.

== Football career ==
Rojas graduated from Real Madrid's youth academy, and played in five matches with the first team during the 1998–99 season. His La Liga debut occurred on 14 November 1998, coming on as a substitute for Christian Panucci at the hour-mark of an eventual 1–2 home loss against Celta de Vigo.

Roja's most successful period was lived at Málaga CF, for whom he signed in the summer of 1999. He appeared in 32 games in his first year, helping the Andalusians retain their recently acquired top flight status, and went on to feature for the side that conquered the 2002 UEFA Intertoto Cup, but only played in 20 league matches in his last two campaigns combined.

After one year with Rayo Vallecano (third division), Rojas retired in 2007 at nearly 33 years of age, having played one season each with modest clubs from the Madrid area. He did not manage to score one goal during his professional career.

Rojas returned to Real Madrid in 2009, being appointed assistant manager in the Infantil A team. The following season, in the same capacity, he was promoted to the Cadete B. In 2011, he received his first head coaching assignment, returning to the Infantil.

== Honours ==
Real Madrid

- Intercontinental Cup: 1998

Málaga

- UEFA Intertoto Cup: 2002
