= Bahía de Cartagena Trophy =

Spanish association football championship

Bahía de Cartagena Trophy is played at Estadio Cartagonova in Cartagena, Spain.

== List of Champion ==
- 1994 Real Madrid. Real Madrid 6-2 Feyenoord.
- 1995 SC Freiburg. SC Freiburg 3-1 Real Madrid.
- 1996 Slovan Bratislava. Slovan Bratislava 2-1 FC Barcelona.
- 1997 NOT HELD.
- 1998 Real Madrid. Real Madrid 3-1 Borussia Mönchengladbach.
- 1999 Real Madrid. Real Madrid 1-1 Perugia.
- 2000 NOT HELD.
- 2001 Real Madrid. Real Madrid 5-1 FC Cartagena.
- 2002 Real Betis. Real Betis 2-0 Real Madrid.

== Titles ==
- 4 titles: (Spain) Real Madrid: 1994, 1998, 1999 and 2001.
- 1 title: (Germany) SC Freiburg: 1995.
- 1 title: (Slovakia) Slovan Bratislava: 1996.
- 1 title: (Spain) Real Betis: 2002.

== Notes and references ==
- Trofeo Bahía de Cartagena
- Real Madrid Friendly matches
