= 1998 Intercontinental Cup =

- Match programme cover
Real Madrid	Vasco da Gama
(Spain)	(Brazil)
2	1
- Date: 1 December 1998
- Venue: National Stadium, Tokyo
- Man of the Match: Raúl (Real Madrid)
- Referee: Mario Sánchez Yantén (Chile)
- Attendance: 51,514
- Weather: Clear night 14.6 °C (58.3 °F); 68% humidity

The 1998 Intercontinental Cup was an association football match played on 1 December 1998 between Real Madrid, winners of the 1997–98 UEFA Champions League, and Vasco da Gama, winners of the 1998 Copa Libertadores. The match was played at a neutral venue, the National Stadium in Tokyo, in front of 51,514 fans. Real Madrid forward Raúl was named as man of the match. Raul's game winning goal is widely recognized as one of the best of his career, and became known as the "Gol del Aguanís".

== Venue ==
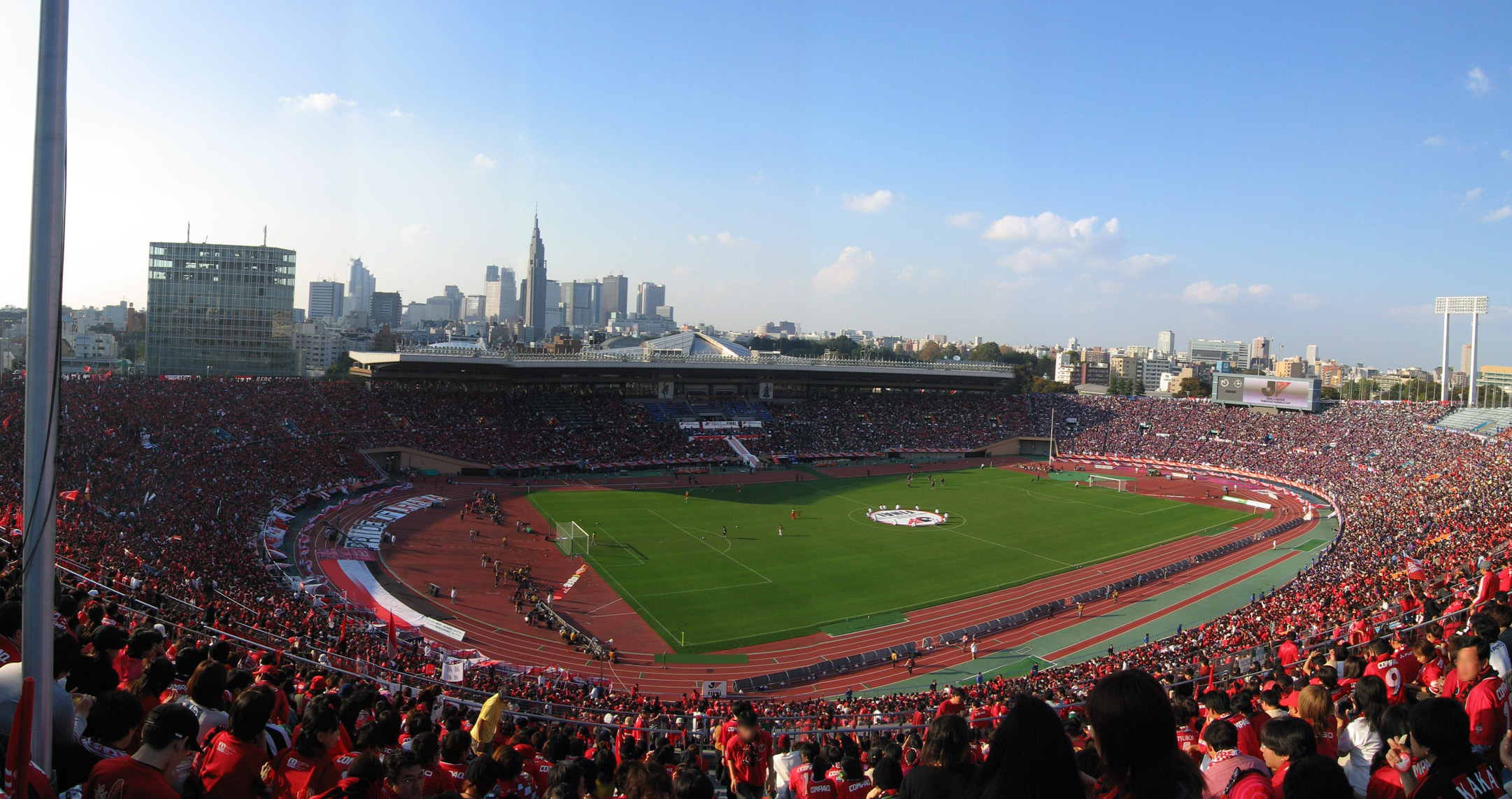
The National Stadium in Tokyo hosted the match

== Match ==
=== Details ===
1 December 1998
19:10 JST

Real Madrid (Spain)	2–1	(Brazil) Vasco da Gama
Nasa 25' (o.g.); Raúl 83'	Report	Juninho 56'

National Stadium, Tokyo
Attendance: 51,514
Referee: Mario Sánchez Yantén (Chile)

Real Madrid	Vasco da Gama

GK	1	(Germany) Bodo Illgner
RB	2	(Italy) Christian Panucci
CB	5	(Spain) Manolo Sanchís (c)
CB	19	(Spain) Fernando Sanz	(yellow card) 73'
LB	3	(Brazil) Roberto Carlos	(yellow card) 19'
DM	6	(Argentina) Fernando Redondo
DM	4	(Spain) Fernando Hierro
CM	10	(Netherlands) Clarence Seedorf	(yellow card) 44'
RF	8	(Federal Republic of Yugoslavia) Predrag Mijatović		(substituted off) 86'
CF	7	(Spain) Raúl
LF	11	(Brazil) Sávio		(substituted off) 90'
Substitutes:
GK	25	(Spain) Eduardo Almansa
DF	12	(Spain) Iván Campo
DF	17	(Croatia) Robert Jarni		(substituted on) 86'
DF	20	(Spain) Roberto Rojas
MF	14	(Spain) Guti
FW	9	(Croatia) Davor Šuker		(substituted on) 90'
FW	15	(Spain) Fernando Morientes
Manager:
(Netherlands) Guus Hiddink

GK	1	(Brazil) Carlos Germano
RB	2	(Brazil) Vágner		(substituted off) 81'
CB	3	(Brazil) Odvan
CB	4	(Brazil) Mauro Galvão (c)
LB	6	(Brazil) Felipe
DM	11	(Brazil) Nasa	(yellow card) 28'
DM	5	(Brazil) Luisinho	(yellow card) 37'	(substituted off) 86'
AM	8	(Brazil) Juninho
AM	10	(Brazil) Ramon Menezes		(substituted off) 89'
CF	9	(Brazil) Luizão	(yellow card) 75'
CF	7	(Brazil) Donizete
Substitutes:
GK	12	(Brazil) Márcio
DF	15	(Brazil) Alex Pinho
DF	17	(Brazil) Válber		(substituted on) 89'
DF	31	(Brazil) Vítor		(substituted on) 81'
MF	18	(Brazil) Nélson
FW	20	(Brazil) Mauricinho
FW	23	(Brazil) Guilherme		(substituted on) 86'
Manager:
(Brazil) Antônio Lopes

Man of the Match:
(Spain) Raúl (Real Madrid)

Assistant referees:
Halim Abdul Hamid (Malaysia)
Keiji Kamiara (Japan)
Fourth official:
Hiroyuki Umemoto (Japan)

Match rules

- 90 minutes.
- 30 minutes of golden goal extra time if necessary.
- Penalty shoot-out if scores still level.
- Seven named substitutes.
- Maximum of three substitutions.

== See also ==
- 1997–98 UEFA Champions League
- 1998 Copa Libertadores
- Real Madrid CF in international football competitions
