= Christian Panucci =

Italian footballer (born 1973)

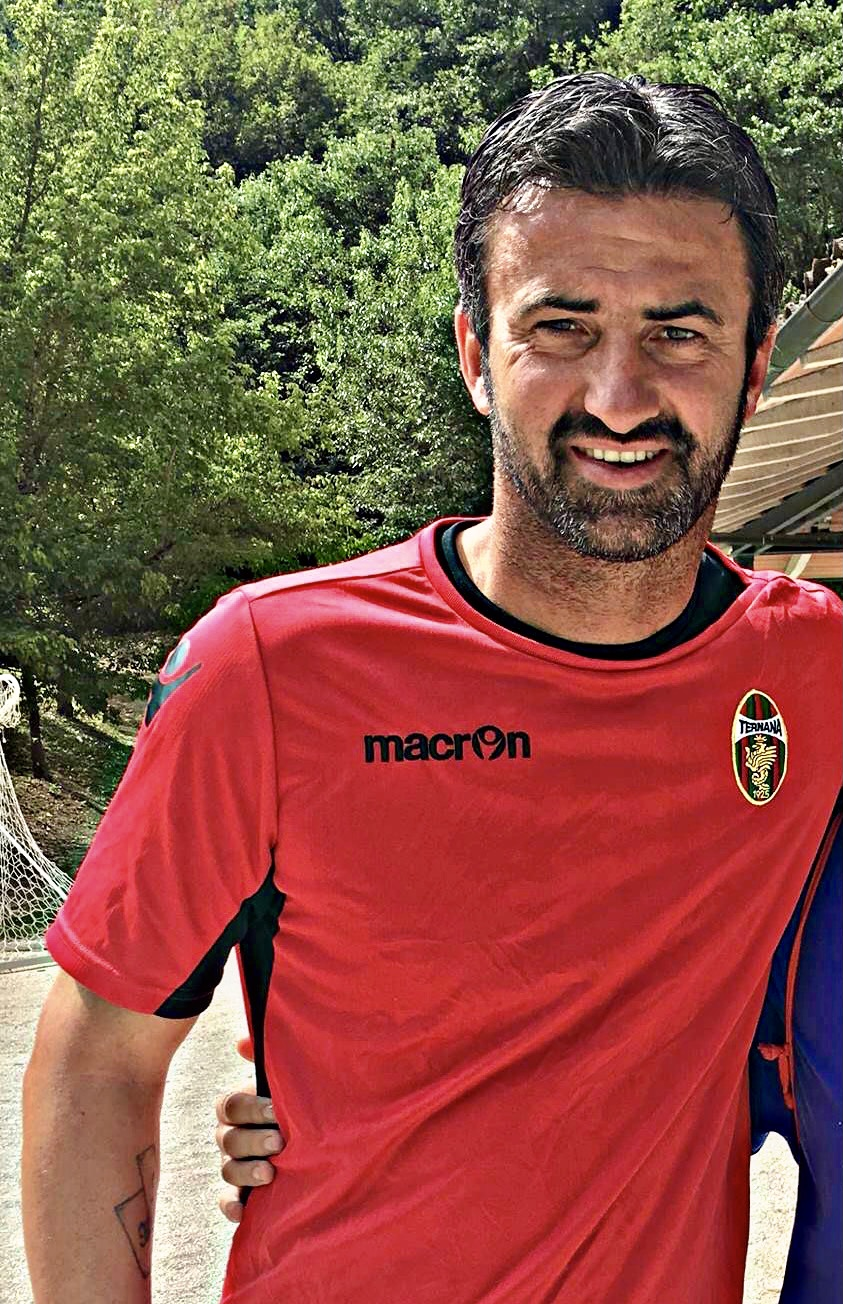
- Panucci with Ternana in 2016

Personal information
- Full name: Christian Panucci
- Date of birth: 12 April 1973 (age 53)
- Place of birth: Savona, Italy
- Height: 1.84 m (6 ft 0 in)
- Position: Right back

Youth career
- 1985–1990: Genoa

Senior career*
Years	Team	Apps	(Gls)
1990–1993	Genoa	31	(3)
1993–1996	AC Milan	89	(9)
1996–1999	Real Madrid	73	(3)
1999–2001	Inter Milan	26	(1)
2000–2001	→ Chelsea (loan)	8	(0)
2001	→ Monaco (loan)	14	(3)
2001–2009	Roma	226	(21)
2009–2010	Parma	19	(1)
Total		486	(41)

International career
1992–1996	Italy U21	19	(4)
1994–2008	Italy	57	(4)

Managerial career
- 2012–2014: Russia (assistant)
- 2015: Livorno
- 2016: Livorno
- 2016: Ternana
- 2017–2019: Albania
Medal record
Men's football
Representing Italy
UEFA European Under-21 Championship
Winner	1994 France
Winner	1996 Spain
- * Club domestic league appearances and goals

Christian Panucci (Italian pronunciation: [ˈkristjam paˈnuttʃi]; born 12 April 1973) is an Italian professional football manager and former player who played as a defender. A versatile player, he began his career as a right-back, but was also capable of playing on the left; as he lost his pace in his later career, he was usually deployed as a centre back, due to his strength in the air.

Panucci began his playing career with Italian club Genoa in 1990, and moved to AC Milan in 1993, where he won several titles, including two Serie A titles and the UEFA Champions League in 1994, appearing in the final 4–0 victory over Barcelona as a left-back. Although he initially served as a back-up to the starting defensive line-up of Paolo Maldini, Franco Baresi, Alessandro Costacurta, and Mauro Tassotti, which is regarded as one of the greatest defences of all time, his precocious performances enabled him to break into the starting line-up, and earned him the Bravo Award in 1994. In 1996, he followed his former Milan coach Fabio Capello to Real Madrid, and was a starting right-back for the Spanish side, winning a La Liga title in 1997, and his second UEFA Champions League in 1998. He returned to Italy to join Inter Milan in 1999, but with less success, and was subsequently sent on loan to Premier League side Chelsea the following season, before joining French side Monaco. He transferred to Roma in 2001, where he was once again reunited with manager Capello, and remained at the club until 2009. His leadership and experience saw him play a key role for the club in his centre-back role, as he won two consecutive Coppa Italia titles in 2007 and 2008, as well as the Supercoppa Italiana. He retired in 2010, after a season with Parma.

After a successful international career at youth level, which saw him win consecutive UEFA European Under-21 Championships, Panucci was a member of the Italy senior national team at the 1996 Olympics, 2002 FIFA World Cup, UEFA Euro 2004, and UEFA Euro 2008, playing 57 matches in total between 1994 and 2008, scoring 4 goals.

Following his retirement, in 2012 Panucci took up a position as an assistant manager to Capello with the Russia national team. In 2015, he was appointed as head coach of Livorno, before joining Ternana in 2016. In July 2017, he was appointed as Albania national team head coach.

== Club career ==
=== Genoa ===
After playing for the Veloce Calcio di Savona youth side, Panucci started his professional career with Genoa in 1990, and made his Serie A debut with the club during the 1991–92 Serie A season; following his impressive performances during the 1992–93 season, which saw him score 3 goals in 30 appearances.

=== Milan ===
Panucci moved to AC Milan in July 1993, at the age of 20. A talented prospect, he was originally brought in as a younger, more attack-minded alternative to the incumbent right-back Mauro Tassotti, who had held the position for over a decade, and was expected to be a back-up. However, Panucci began to work his way into the starting lineup under manager Fabio Capello, appearing in 19 league matches and scoring twice as Milan won domestic and European titles. He also demonstrated his versatility by lining up at left-back in the 1994 UEFA Champions League final, while Tassotti played on the right, and Paolo Maldini and Filippo Galli in the centre, filling in for the injured Franco Baresi and the suspended Alessandro Costacurta, who were normally the club's starting central defensive pair; despite several important absences, Milan defeated Barcelona 4–0 to win the title. Nonetheless, it was Tassotti, not Panucci, who traveled to the United States that summer as part of the Italian World Cup selection under Arrigo Sacchi. For his performances, Panucci won the Bravo Award, as the best Under-23 player in Europe.

In the following season, Panucci established himself as the club's first-choice right-back, starting 28 of 34 matches in Serie A, and fully broke into the senior national team. Milan started the season strongly, winning both the Supercoppa Italiana and the UEFA Super Cup, but finished fourth in the league, behind champions Juventus, while they lost out to Vélez Sársfield in the 1994 Intercontinental Cup final, and to Ajax in the Champions League final that season. Panucci had one of his best offensive seasons in 1995–96, scoring five goals, while helping to form the league's tightest defence, and one of the greatest of all time, alongside internationals Baresi, Maldini, and Costacurta, (Note: See) as Milan regained the Italian championship. The sweeping changes across Europe as a result of the Bosman ruling, however, opened up new opportunities. After winning six titles with AC Milan, midway through the 1996–97 season, Panucci left the club for Real Madrid, joining former AC Milan coach Fabio Capello at the Spanish giants.

=== Real Madrid ===
At Real Madrid, Panucci became the first Italian to play for the Spanish club. Arriving in winter, he soon unseated the previous right-back, Carlos Secretario with his excellent performances, and formed a highly aggressive fullback pairing, starting alongside Brazilian star Roberto Carlos, who played on the left. This was a strong period for Real Madrid on the field, as the club immediately won the league in 1997, but a chaotic one on the sidelines as managers Capello, Jupp Heynckes, Guus Hiddink, and John Toshack followed one another in rapid succession. The high point for Panucci at this stage of his career came in 1998, when he won his second Champions League title against Juventus. Once more, however, he was not selected for the national team, missing out on the World Cup under manager Cesare Maldini. After a disappointing 1998–99 season in which Real Madrid only managed to capture the Intercontinental Cup, losing out in the UEFA Super Cup, and finishing well behind rivals Barcelona in La Liga, Panucci elected to return to Italian football.

=== Inter Milan ===
Panucci later transferred to Inter in 1999, and represented the club during the 1999–2000 season. Panucci was not able to re-capture his previous form during his time with Inter, and frequently clashed with manager Marcello Lippi, later struggling to gain playing time while the team endured a difficult season. Inter finished the season with a fourth-place league finish, also reaching the Coppa Italia final.

==== Chelsea (loan) ====
In August 2000, he was sent on loan to Chelsea, where he scored once in the UEFA Cup against St. Gallen, but only made 8 appearances in the Premier League, failing to find the back of the net.

==== Monaco (loan) ====
He subsequently moved to French side Monaco for the second half of the season, making nine league appearances and scoring three goals. He made five league appearances for the club the following season, before returning to Italy to play for Roma in 2001.

=== Roma ===
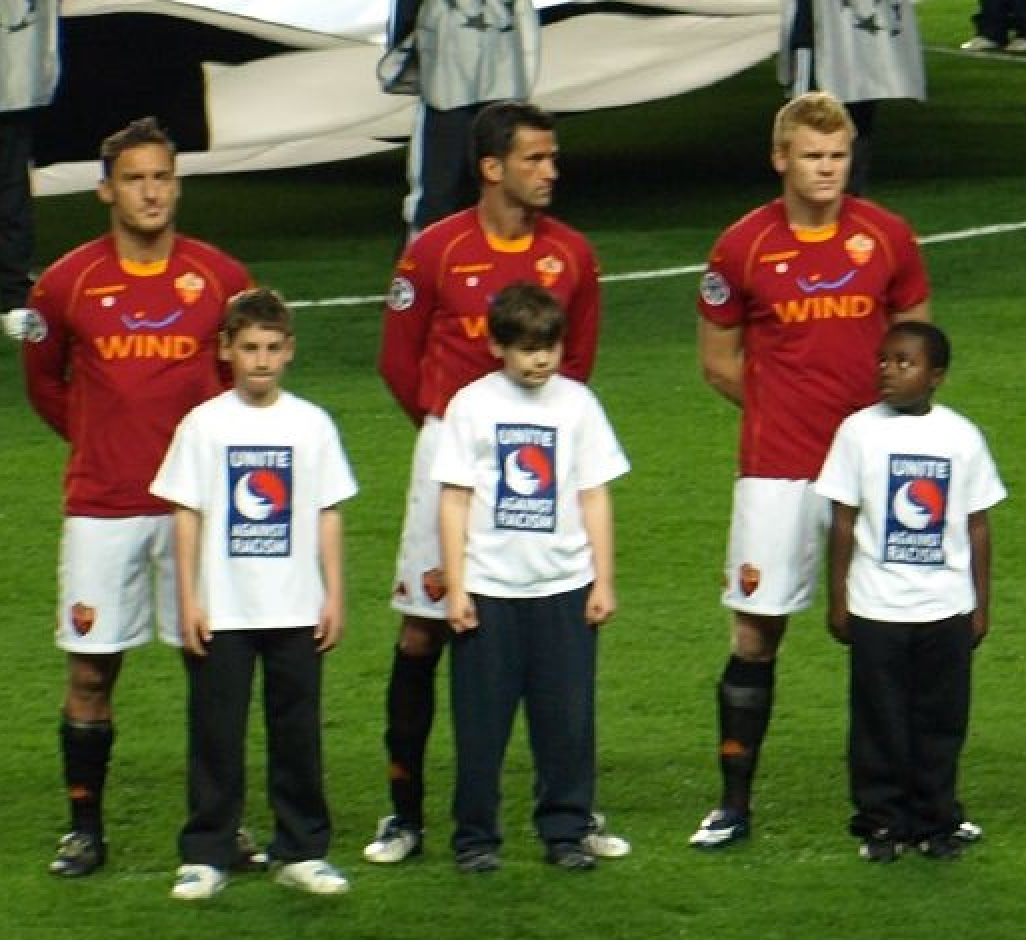
Panucci (in centre) with Roma in 2008

After a great deal of travelling throughout his career, Panucci finally settled at Roma. He joined the Roman club in the 2001–02 campaign, the year after the Giallorossi had won the national title, and immediately won the 2001 Supercoppa Italiana. He went on to become a key player and one of the leaders of the club, and was the team's permanent starting right-back. In July 2002, he was signed permanently for €9.81 million.

Panucci, a reliable leader both on and off the field, often took the responsibility to speak for the team in moments of difficulty, as seen after Roma's shock elimination from the Champions League in 2007. He proved to be a decisive player for the club during the 2006–07 season, scoring several goals, and contributed to Roma's Coppa Italia victory with his performances, scoring a brace in a 6–2 win in the first leg of the final against Inter. Panucci started the 2007–08 season strongly, immediately winning the 2007 Supercoppa Italiana over Inter, although he later lost his place as the club's starting right-back to Cicinho, and was played mainly as a back-up central defender. He was later able to fight his way back into the starting line-up for the second half of the season, scoring several goals (five in Serie A, and one in the UEFA Champions League), as Roma finished second in the league, and defended their Coppa Italia title.

His prolific offensive performances continued through to the opening of the 2008–09 season, despite the club's poor run of form, as he scored 2 goals in the league against Reggina and Atalanta, and 2 more in the UEFA Champions League, against Cluj and Chelsea. On 25 January 2009, Panucci was dropped from Roma's first team squad after refusing to sit on the bench for a league match against Napoli, and was later also excluded from the Champions League squad list. Due to his difficult relationship with manager Luciano Spalletti, he announced his intention to leave Roma, but no serious bidder was found in the January transfer window and he ultimately stayed, returning to the first team on 28 February after he officially apologised to his fellow players and the club management. He was sent off in the second Derby della Capitale of the 2008–09 season after a heated on-pitch clash with Lazio player Stephan Lichtsteiner following his hard challenge on the Swiss defender. His contract with Roma ended on 30 June 2009, which he had signed in October 2005, making him a free agent.

He played a total of 311 matches, scoring 29 goals for Roma, becoming the highest-scoring defender in the club's history.

=== Parma ===
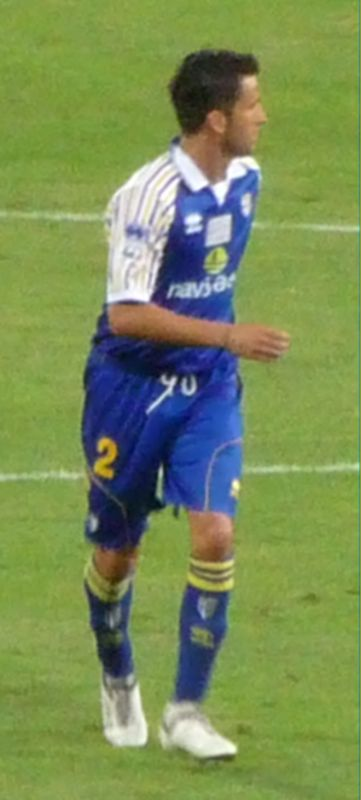
Panucci with Parma in 2009

On 30 July 2009, Panucci signed for Parma on a one-year deal; he made his debut with the club on 23 August, away at Udinese in the first match of the season, and scored his first goal for Parma on 13 December against Bologna. On 23 February 2010, Panucci left Parma by mutual consent seven months after joining them.

On 22 August, Panucci announced his immediate retirement from football, stating: "I had offers, but I just don't feel the hunger anymore."

== International career ==
Panucci had a successful career with the Italy national under-21 football team, winning consecutive under-21 European Championship titles in 1994 and 1996 under manager Cesare Maldini; in the final of the latter edition of the tournament against Spain, following a 1–1 draw, he took and missed Italy's first penalty in an eventual 4–2 shoot-out victory.

After missing out on the Italy squad that reached the final of the 1994 FIFA World Cup, Panucci made his senior Italy debut on 7 September 1994 against Slovenia in a UEFA Euro 1996 qualifying match. He missed out on the squad for the final tournament, however, following a dispute with Italy national coach Arrigo Sacchi. Despite missing out on the European Championship squad, he was named the captain of the Italy national team that took part at the 1996 Summer Olympics in Atlanta, under his former youth coach Maldini. As he spent the following seasons abroad, however, he was once again excluded from Maldini's team for the 1998 FIFA World Cup, and he was also left out of Dino Zoff's squad for UEFA Euro 2000 due to his lack of playing and irregular performances with Inter; it was not until the 2002 World Cup, under manager Giovanni Trapattoni, that Panucci became a regular in the Italian team.

In the 2002 World Cup, Panucci was widely blamed for failing to clear a pass that led to the equalising goal for co-hosts South Korea by Seol Ki-hyeon in the dying minutes of regulation time in the round of 16; Ahn Jung-hwan scored the golden goal of the match in extra time, which eliminated the Italian team from the tournament. In the first half of regulation time, Panucci had also conceded a controversial penalty, after referee Byron Moreno judged him to have pulled down Seol Ki-Hyeon in the box; Ahn's spot kick was saved by Italy's goalkeeper Gianluigi Buffon, however.

After taking part in Italy's unsuccessful campaign at Euro 2004 in Portugal, assisting Antonio Cassano's goal in a 1–1 draw against Sweden in Italy's second group match of the tournament, Panucci did not play for Italy for over three years. Despite his performances and the lack of genuine quality Italian right-backs, he was ignored by manager Marcello Lippi, with whom he had fallen out in his days at Inter Milan, during the 2006 FIFA World Cup qualifying campaign, as Italy went on to win the final tournament in Germany. The 34-year-old, however, was given a second chance by coach Roberto Donadoni, who called him up for the Euro 2008 qualifiers against Georgia, Scotland, and the Faroe Islands.

Panucci expressed his delight at earning his 50th Italy cap in the stadium where he began his career for the Azzurri in the 2–0 win over Georgia in their Euro 2008 qualifying tie in Genoa at the Stadio Luigi Ferraris.

It was really emotional for me to play in an arena where I grew up. It may have seemed a little scripted but I'll never forget the standing ovation I received.

On 17 November 2007, Panucci managed to score his first international goal for Italy since April 2002, when he headed a crucial injury-time winning goal against Scotland in their Euro 2008 qualifying Group B match. Italy then managed to clinch their place at the European Championship finals.

On 13 June 2008, in Italy's second group match at Euro 2008, Panucci scored Italy's first goal of the tournament in a 1–1 draw against Romania, and became the oldest player to score in outfield play in the competition, and Italy's all-time oldest goalscorer, at the age of 35 years, 2 months and 1 day at the time; the latter record was later broken by Fabio Quagliarella in 2019. He later also conceded a penalty, which was saved by Italy goalkeeper Gianluigi Buffon. Panucci finished his Italy career with 57 total caps, scoring four goals.

== Style of play ==
Panucci was a quick, strong, competitive, and versatile player, who was primarily deployed as a right-back, but was also capable of playing on the left or in the centre, or also as a wing-back. Although he was at times criticised for being overly temperamental or for suffering occasional lapses in concentration, he made a name for himself throughout his career as a composed, defensive-minded full-back, who was known for his work-rate, defensive consistency, and for being comfortable in possession; he also possessed significant stamina, as well as notable physical and athletic attributes. He was primarily renowned for his ability in the air as a footballer, frequently scoring with his head from set pieces; his aerial prowess, along with his accurate distribution, precise crossing, good technical skills, and ability to make attacking runs down the flank, also allowed him to contribute offensively to his team's play, with goals and assists; with 34 goals in Serie A, he is among the most prolific defenders in the history of the Italian league. In his later career, as he lost his pace, he mainly played as a central defender, where he stood out for his leadership, tenacity, and tactical intelligence, earning the nickname "El Grinta" from commentator Carlo Zampa.

== Post-playing career ==
After his retirement, Panucci became a football pundit and color commentator for SKY Italia.

In 2011, he took part in the Italian edition of Dancing with the Stars.

== Managerial career ==
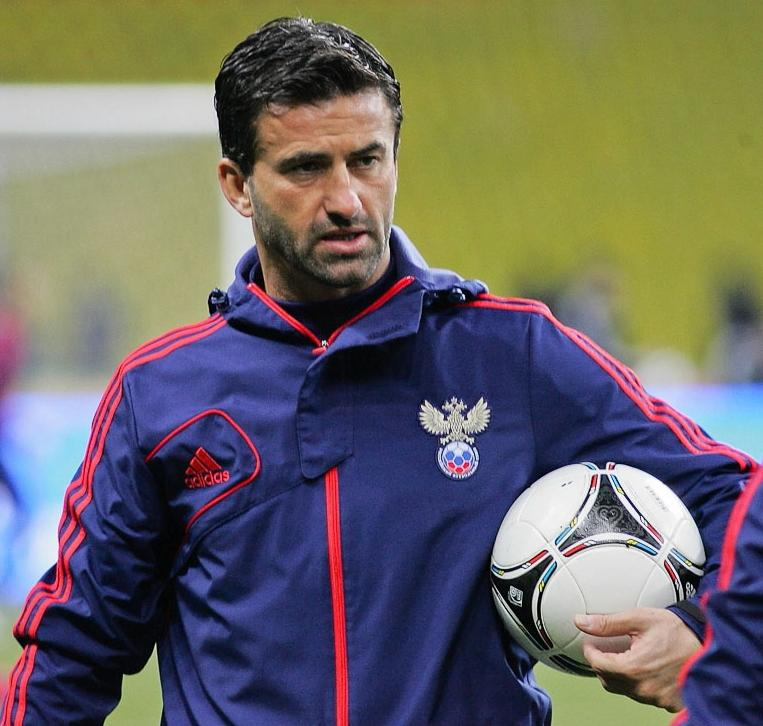
Panucci working with Russia as the team's assistant coach in 2012

Panucci left his job as a pundit on 19 March 2012 to accept an offer from Maurizio Zamparini as team manager of Palermo, working alongside director of football and scouting chief Luca Cattani. On 24 April 2012, he resigned from his position just over a month after he took the job.

On 23 July 2012, he was invited by Fabio Capello to work as his assistant in his work as a head coach of Russia national football team. He left his position after the end of the 2014 FIFA World Cup.

In 2013, he qualified for the UEFA Pro Licence.

On 18 March 2015, he was named as manager of Serie B team Livorno, replacing Ezio Gelain.

In June 2016, he was appointed as head coach of Ternana signing a one-year contract.

=== Albania national team ===
On 19 July 2017, Panucci was appointed as the Albania national football team head coach signing a two years and four month contract with the Albanian Football Association, replaced fellow Italian coach Gianni De Biasi, who resigned in previous month. He started his work immediately traveling to Basel, Switzerland in July 2017 to watch Taulant Xhaka playing for Basel. However, Xhaka was an unused substitute in the game and later was forced by Basel's coach along with all fellow unused substitutes in that game to train on the pitch post-match.

After being in the stadium for the game among his assistant Ervin Bulku, Panucci waited outside to meet Xhaka but unfortunately this meeting did not happen as Xhaka, being unsatisfied with Basel's coach decision, went home immediately and did not notice Panucci's SMS. Panucci then travelled to Zürich to see fellow Albanian midfielder Burim Kukeli who played with Zürich.

In his first gathering with Albania national team for the 2018 FIFA World Cup qualification matches against Liechtenstein and Macedonia on 2 and 5 September 2017, Panucci brought 3 new players, Iván Balliu, the Spanish-born Albanian descent which previously played for Spain under-17 side, Valon Ahmedi and Hysen Memolla, both former Albanian under-21 internationals. In his first match in charge on 2 September against Liechtenstein, he led Albania to a 2–0 victory at the Elbasan Arena.

In the 2018–19 UEFA Nations League C, Albania was drawn in Group 1 with Scotland and Israel. In the first match against Israel, Panucci's side won 1–0 by a goal from Taulant Xhaka, which would be the only goal that Albania scored in the competition, as they went on to lose twice against Scotland, 2–0 and 4–0, and lose against Israel in the return leg 2–0.

After a 2–0 home loss against Turkey in the first UEFA Euro 2020 qualifying match on 22 March 2019, Panucci was sacked the following day; during his tenure as head coach for Albania he only achieved four wins and two draws in 15 matches.

== Personal life ==
Panucci is half Italian and half Czech, the son of Vittorio, an Italian postman, and Hana, a Czech woman; they first met in Prague while he was there as part of a football team representing the Poste Italiane. His brother Patrick (born 1970) is also a former footballer whose career was spent almost entirely in the amateur divisions of Italy before becoming a scout.

Panucci narrowly escaped death in 1996. He had been chosen as captain of the Italy national team at the 1996 Olympics, but was subsequently injured. Planning to return to Italy, he booked a flight on 17 July from New York to Rome — TWA Flight 800. When his baggage from his connecting flight to New York was delayed, he rebooked to a later flight to Milan. The earlier TWA flight exploded over the Atlantic shortly after takeoff, killing all 230 tripulants.

== Career statistics ==
=== Club ===
Appearances and goals by club, season and competition
Club	Season	League			Cup		League Cup		Continental		Others		Total	
Club	Season	Division	Apps	Goals	Apps	Goals	Apps	Goals	Apps	Goals	Apps	Goals	Apps	Goals
Italy		League			Coppa Italia		League Cup		Europe		Others		Total	
Genoa	1991–92	Serie A	1	0	—		—		—		—		1	0
Genoa	1992–93	Serie A	30	3	3	1	—		—		—		33	4
Genoa	Total		31	3	3	1	—		—		—		34	4
Milan	1993–94	Serie A	19	2	3	0	—		7	1	3	0	32	3
Milan	1994–95	Serie A	28	2	4	0	—		10	2	2	0	44	4
Milan	1995–96	Serie A	29	5	2	0	—		7	0	—		38	5
Milan	1996–97	Serie A	13	0	2	0	—		6	0	—		21	0
Milan	Total		89	9	11	0	—		30	3	5	0	135	12
Spain		League			Copa del Rey		Supercopa de España		Europe		Others		Total	
Real Madrid	1996–97	La Liga	19	2	2	0	—		—		—		21	2
Real Madrid	1997–98	La Liga	23	1	1	0	1	0	8	1	—		33	2
Real Madrid	1998–99	La Liga	31	0	2	0	—		7	2	2	0	42	2
Real Madrid	Total		73	3	5	0	1	0	15	3	2	0	96	6
Italy		League			Coppa Italia		League Cup		Europe		Others		Total	
Internazionale	1999–00	Serie A	26	1	6	0	—		—		—		32	1
England		League			FA Cup		League Cup		Europe		Others		Total	
Chelsea	2000–01	Premier League	8	0	—		—		2	1	—		10	1
France		League			Coupe de France		Coupe de la Ligue		Europe		Others		Total	
Monaco	2000–01	Division 1	9	3	1	0	4	0	—		—		14	3
Monaco	2001–02	Division 1	5	0	—		—		—		—		5	0
Monaco	Total		14	3	1	0	4	0	—		—		19	3
Italy		League			Coppa Italia		League Cup		Europe		Others		Total	
Roma	2001–02	Serie A	31	1	4	2	—		4	1	—		39	4
Roma	2002–03	Serie A	27	2	6	0	—		11	0	—		44	2
Roma	2003–04	Serie A	24	2	2	0	—		3	0	—		29	2
Roma	2004–05	Serie A	26	0	4	0	—		3	0	—		33	0
Roma	2005–06	Serie A	35	3	6	0	—		9	2	—		50	5
Roma	2006–07	Serie A	34	5	6	2	—		9	1	1	0	50	8
Roma	2007–08	Serie A	27	5	5	0	—		6	1	1	0	39	6
Roma	2008–09	Serie A	22	3	1	0	—		5	2	0	0	28	5
Roma	Total		226	21	34	4	—		50	7	2	0	312	32
Parma	2009–10	Serie A	19	1	1	0	—		—		—		20	1
Total	Italy		391	35	55	5	—		80	10	7	0	533	50
Total	Spain		73	3	5	0	1	0	15	3	2	0	96	6
Total	England		8	0	—		—		2	1	—		10	1
Total	France		9	3	1	0	4	0	—		—		14	3
Career total			481	41	61	5	5	0	97	14	9	0	653	60

=== International ===
National team	Year	Apps	Goals
Italy	1994	3	1
Italy	1995	0	0
Italy	1996	1	0
Italy	1997	3	0
Italy	1998	4	0
Italy	1999	9	0
Italy	2000	1	0
Italy	2001	0	0
Italy	2002	11	1
Italy	2003	9	0
Italy	2004	7	0
Italy	2005	0	0
Italy	2006	0	0
Italy	2007	3	1
Italy	2008	6	1
Total		57	4

==== International goals ====
Italy score listed first, score column indicates score after each Panucci's goal.

#	Date	Venue	Cap	Opponent	Score	Result	Competition
1.	8 October 1994	Kadrioru Staadion, Tallinn, Estonia	2	Estonia	1–0	2–0	UEFA Euro 1996 qualifying
2.	17 April 2002	San Siro, Milan, Italy	23	Uruguay	1–0	1–1	Friendly
3.	17 November 2007	Hampden Park, Glasgow, Scotland	51	Scotland	2–1	2–1	UEFA Euro 2008 qualifying
4.	13 June 2008	Letzigrund, Zürich, Switzerland	55	Romania	1–1	1–1	UEFA Euro 2008

== Managerial statistics ==
As of 23 March 2019

Managerial record by team and tenure
Team	From	To	Record				
Team	From	To	P	W	D	L	Win %
Livorno	18 March 2015	25 November 2015	27	9	9	9	33.3
Livorno	27 January 2016	11 March 2016	9	2	3	4	22.2
Ternana	1 July 2016	11 August 2016	1	1	0	0	100.0
Albania	19 July 2017	23 March 2019	15	4	2	9	26.7
Total			52	16	14	22	30.8

== Honours ==
=== Club ===
AC Milan

- Serie A: 1993–94, 1995–96
- UEFA Champions League: 1993–94
- UEFA Super Cup: 1994

Real Madrid

- La Liga: 1996–97
- Supercopa de España: 1997
- UEFA Champions League: 1997–98
- Intercontinental Cup: 1998

Roma

- Coppa Italia: 2006–07, 2007–08
- Supercoppa Italiana: 2007

=== International ===
Italy

- UEFA European Under-21 Championship: 1994, 1996

=== Individual ===
- Bravo Award: 1994
- ESM Team of the Year: 2007–08
