= Manuel Canabal =

Spanish footballer (born 1974)

Personal information
- Full name: Manuel Canabal Fiestras
- Date of birth: 10 November 1974 (age 51)
- Place of birth: Forcarei, Spain
- Height: 1.95 m (6 ft 5 in)
- Position: Centre-forward

Youth career
- Atlético Forcarei
- Pontevedra

Senior career*
Years	Team	Apps	(Gls)
1994–1995	Pontevedra	22	(5)
1995–1996	Leganés	1	(0)
1996	Mérida B		
1996–1997	Mérida	36	(10)
1997–1998	Real Madrid	0	(0)
1997–1998	→ Valladolid (loan)	15	(1)
1998–1999	Alavés	30	(5)
1999–2000	Rayo Vallecano	33	(11)
2000–2004	Málaga	95	(11)
2004–2005	Pontevedra	23	(2)
Total		255	(45)
- * Club domestic league appearances and goals

Manuel Canabal Fiestras (born 10 November 1974 in Forcarei, Province of Pontevedra) is a Spanish former professional footballer who played as a centre-forward.

== Honours ==
Mérida

- Segunda División: 1996–97

Málaga

- UEFA Intertoto Cup: 2002
