= Jaime Sánchez (footballer, born 1973) =

Spanish footballer

Jaime
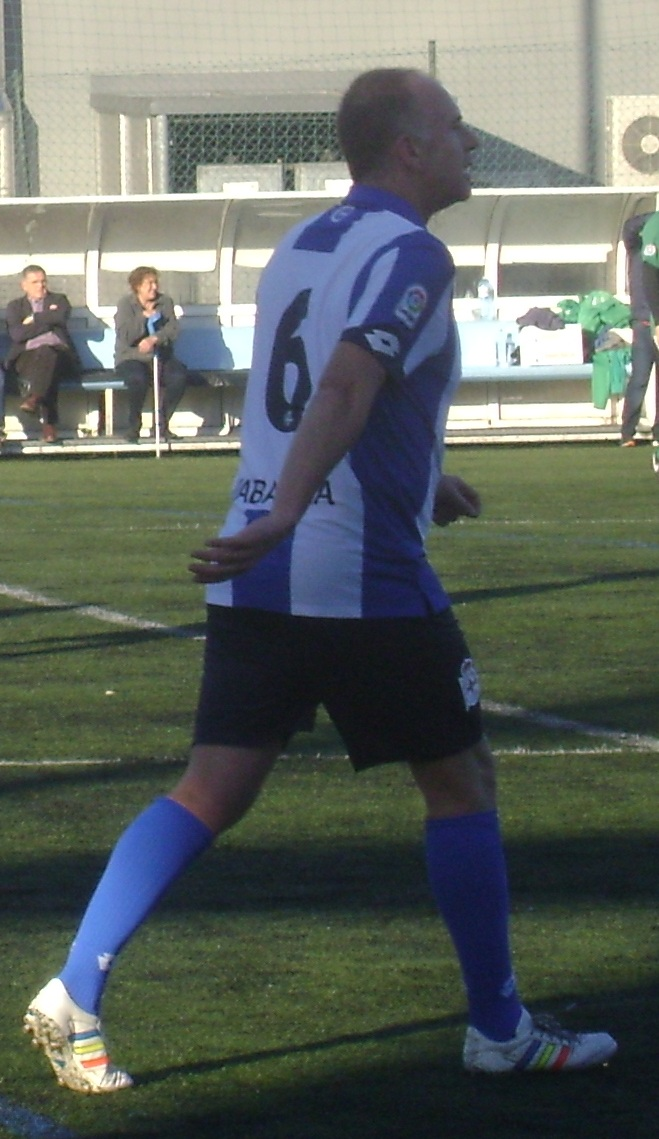
- Jaime in 2016

Personal information
- Full name: Jaime Sánchez Fernández
- Date of birth: 20 March 1973 (age 53)
- Place of birth: Madrid, Spain
- Height: 1.75 m (5 ft 9 in)
- Position: Defensive midfielder

Senior career*
Years	Team	Apps	(Gls)
1991–1993	Alcalá	38	(5)
1993–1994	Real Madrid C	34	(4)
1994–1996	Real Madrid B	66	(6)
1996–1999	Real Madrid	45	(0)
1996–1997	→ Racing Santander (loan)	36	(0)
1999–2004	Deportivo La Coruña	21	(0)
2000–2001	→ Racing Santander (loan)	21	(2)
2001–2002	→ Tenerife (loan)	27	(2)
2002–2003	→ Hannover 96 (loan)	22	(0)
2004	→ Hannover 96 (loan)	10	(1)
2004–2005	Albacete	22	(0)
2005–2006	Racing Ferrol	16	(0)
Total		358	(20)
- * Club domestic league appearances and goals

Jaime Sánchez Fernández (born 20 March 1973), known simply as Jaime, is a Spanish former professional footballer who played as a defensive midfielder.

== Club career ==
Jaime was born in Madrid. After starting professionally with a modest team, RSD Alcalá (with whom he achieved a 1992 promotion to Segunda División B), he joined Real Madrid, spending three seasons with its reserve sides.

Jaime first appeared in La Liga for Racing de Santander, on loan, being a mainstay during 1996–97 and subsequently returning home to help Madrid to the following campaign's UEFA Champions League, coming in the 82nd minute of their 1–0 win against Juventus FC and remaining two years with the club.

Subsequently, Jaime signed for Deportivo de La Coruña and, prior to the team's signing of Aldo Duscher, would appear significantly in the 2000 league conquest, the only in the Galicians' history. However, it would be the only season he would play for Depor, being consecutively loaned for the duration of his link, including twice to German Bundesliga's Hannover 96.

Jaime retired in 2006 at the age of 33, after one-year stints with Albacete Balompié and Racing de Ferrol – the latter in the Segunda División – both ended in relegation.

== Honours ==
Real Madrid

- Supercopa de España: 1997
- UEFA Champions League: 1997–98

Deportivo

- La Liga: 1999–2000
