= Álvaro Benito =

Spanish footballer and musician

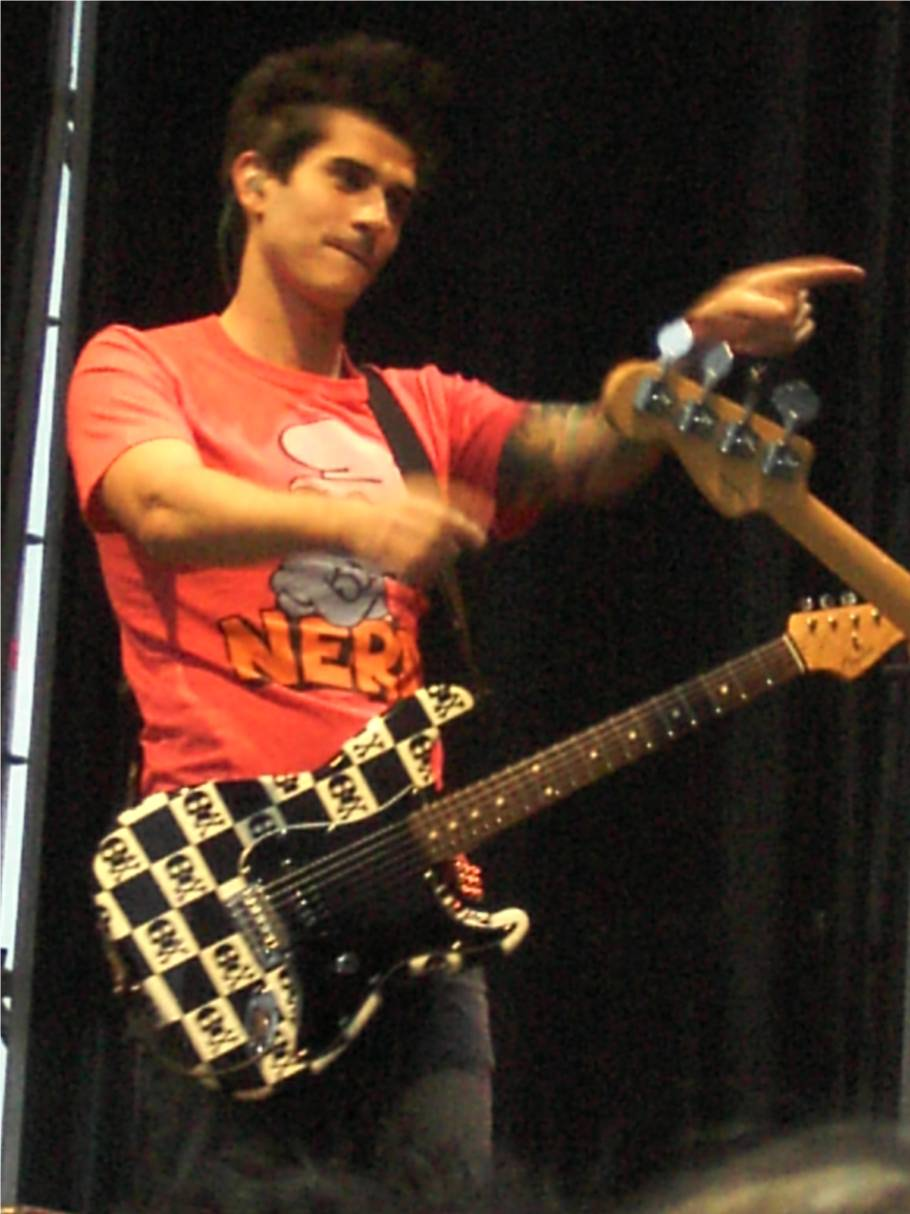

Personal information
- Full name: Álvaro Benito Villar
- Date of birth: 10 December 1976 (age 49)
- Place of birth: Salamanca, Spain
- Height: 1.78 m (5 ft 10 in)
- Position: Midfielder

Youth career
- Ávila
- 1991–1994: Real Madrid

Senior career*
Years	Team	Apps	(Gls)
1994–1995	Real Madrid C	20	(1)
1995–1997	Real Madrid B	12	(2)
1995–2002	Real Madrid	21	(2)
1997–1998	→ Tenerife (loan)	2	(1)
2001–2002	Real Madrid B	11	(1)
2002–2003	Getafe	6	(0)
Total		72	(7)

International career
1992–1993	Spain U16	13	(0)
1993–1995	Spain U18	5	(1)
1996	Spain U21	1	(0)

Managerial career
- 2015–2019: Real Madrid (youth)
- * Club domestic league appearances and goals

Álvaro Benito
- Genres: Rock; pop rock; pop punk
- Occupations: Singer-songwriter; guitarist
- Instruments: Vocals; guitar

Álvaro Benito Villar (born 10 December 1976) is a Spanish retired footballer who played as a left midfielder. He later worked as a Rock musician.

== Club career ==
Born in Salamanca, Region of León, Benito emerged through Real Madrid's youth ranks, making his senior debut not yet aged 18 with the C team. He progressed to the reserves the following year.

Benito was relatively used by the main squad in the 1995–96 season, and contributed seven matches the following campaign as they were crowned La Liga champions. In November 1996, he suffered a severe knee injury from which he would never fully recover, undergoing three operations in only four months in 1998 in Pittsburgh, United States; he was involved in a car accident afterwards, which further curtailed his recovering process.

After one unassuming loan with CD Tenerife and another spell with Castilla, Benito was released by Real Madrid in summer 2002, joining city neighbours Getafe CF of Segunda División. He appeared rarely for his new club, again due to injury.

After retiring, Benito was in charge of several of Real's youth sides, starting with the Alevín B in 2015. He was dismissed in late February 2019, due to criticism of the first team following a 0–3 home defeat against FC Barcelona in the semi-finals of the Copa del Rey on a radio show.

== International career ==
Benito won his only cap for the Spain under-21 side on 12 November 1996, coming on as a late substitute for FC Barcelona's Roger García in a 1–1 home draw against Slovakia for the 1998 UEFA European Championship qualifiers, but being stretchered off shortly after with a serious injury that all but ended his career.

== Musical career ==
During his rehabilitation period, Benito started playing guitar and writing songs, going on to put together a band, Pignoise. The group, which also featured another former footballer, Héctor Polo (Real Zaragoza, Rayo Vallecano), eventually used many of the songs he composed prior to its creation.

== Honours ==
Real Madrid

- La Liga: 1996–97

Spain U16

- UEFA European Under-16 Championship runner-up: 1992
