= 2003–04 Chelsea F.C. season =

English football club season

Chelsea
2003–04 season
- Owner: Roman Abramovich
- Chairman: Ken Bates (until March 2004); Bruce Buck
- Manager: Claudio Ranieri
- Stadium: Stamford Bridge
- FA Premier League: 2nd
- FA Cup: Fifth round
- League Cup: Quarter-finals
- UEFA Champions League: Semi-finals
- Top goalscorer: League: Jimmy Floyd Hasselbaink (13); All: Jimmy Floyd Hasselbaink (18)
| Home colours | Away colours | Third colours |

The 2003–04 season was Chelsea F.C.'s 12th consecutive season in the Premier League and 98th year as a club. In July 2003, long-time chairman Ken Bates sold the club to Russian billionaire Roman Abramovich. Manager Claudio Ranieri was sacked on 31 May 2004 and was replaced by José Mourinho for the following season.

Chelsea finished the season as runners-up in the Premier League. In the Champions League Chelsea reached the semi-finals against AS Monaco, but failed to reach the final, losing 5–3 on aggregate to the French side. They also exited the FA Cup in the fifth round to Arsenal and the Carling Cup in the quarter-finals to Aston Villa.

== Team kit ==
The team kit was produced by Umbro. The shirt sponsor was the airline Emirates; the kit bore the "Fly Emirates" logo. Chelsea's home kit was all blue with a white collar. Their new away kit was all white with black and blue stripes down the centre. Last season's away kit (all black with blue accents) was retained as the club's third kit.

== First team squad ==
Squad at end of season

Note: Flags indicate national team as defined under FIFA eligibility rules; some limited exceptions apply. Players may hold more than one non-FIFA nationality.

| No. | Pos. | Nation | Player |
|---|---|---|---|
| 2 | DF | ENG | Glen Johnson |
| 3 | DF | NGR | Celestine Babayaro |
| 4 | MF | FRA | Claude Makélélé |
| 6 | DF | FRA | Marcel Desailly |
| 7 | FW | ROU | Adrian Mutu |
| 8 | MF | ENG | Frank Lampard |
| 9 | FW | NED | Jimmy Floyd Hasselbaink |
| 10 | MF | ENG | Joe Cole |
| 11 | MF | IRL | Damien Duff |
| 12 | MF | CRO | Mario Stanić |
| 13 | DF | FRA | William Gallas |
| 14 | MF | CMR | Geremi |
| 15 | DF | NED | Mario Melchiot |
| 17 | MF | FRA | Emmanuel Petit |

| No. | Pos. | Nation | Player |
|---|---|---|---|
| 18 | DF | ENG | Wayne Bridge |
| 19 | MF | ENG | Scott Parker |
| 20 | MF | ARG | Juan Sebastián Verón |
| 21 | FW | ARG | Hernán Crespo |
| 22 | FW | ISL | Eiður Guðjohnsen |
| 23 | GK | ITA | Carlo Cudicini |
| 26 | DF | ENG | John Terry |
| 27 | MF | CYP | Alexis Nicolas |
| 28 | MF | POR | Filipe Oliveira |
| 29 | DF | GER | Robert Huth |
| 30 | MF | DEN | Jesper Grønkjær |
| 31 | GK | ITA | Marco Ambrosio |
| 32 | FW | FIN | Mikael Forssell |
| 34 | GK | SCO | Neil Sullivan |

== Reserve squad ==
Note: Flags indicate national team as defined under FIFA eligibility rules; some limited exceptions apply. Players may hold more than one non-FIFA nationality.

| No. | Pos. | Nation | Player |
|---|---|---|---|
| 33 | DF | ENG | Joel Kitamirike |
| 35 | GK | AUT | Jürgen Macho |
| 36 | MF | ENG | Joe Keenan |
| 37 | FW | GER | Sebastian Kneißl |
| 38 | DF | ITA | Valerio Di Cesare |
| 39 | FW | ENG | Carlton Cole |
| 40 | GK | ENG | Lenny Pidgeley |
| 41 | MF | ENG | Craig Rocastle |
| 42 | DF | ENG | Ben Hudell |
| 43 | MF | ENG | Danny Jeffreys |
| 44 | MF | POR | Filipe Morais |
| 45 | MF | ENG | Billy Sentance |

| No. | Pos. | Nation | Player |
|---|---|---|---|
| 47 | DF | ENG | Sam Tillen |
| 48 | DF | SCO | Steven Watt |
| 49 | DF | ENG | Danny Woodards |
| 50 | GK | BEL | Yves Ma-Kalambay |
| — | DF | ENG | Ed Brand |
| — | DF | ENG | Adrian Pettigrew |
| — | DF | ENG | Dean Smith |
| — | DF | NED | Winston Bogarde |
| — | DF | BRA | Gustavo Lazzaretti |
| — | MF | ENG | Danny Hollands |
| — | MF | NED | Mbark Boussoufa |

== Transfers ==
=== In ===
| # | Pos | Player | From | Fee | Date |
|---|---|---|---|---|---|
| 1 | GK | (Austria) Jürgen Macho | (England) Sunderland | Free | 1 July 2003 |
| 31 | GK | (Italy) Marco Ambrosio | (Italy) Chievo Verona | Free | 1 July 2003 |
| 2 | DF | (England) Glen Johnson | (England) West Ham United | £6,000,000 | 15 July 2003 |
| 14 | MF | (Cameroon) Geremi | (Spain) Real Madrid | £7,000,000 | 16 July 2003 |
| 18 | DF | (England) Wayne Bridge | (England) Southampton | £7,000,000 | 21 July 2003 |
| 11 | MF | (Republic of Ireland) Damien Duff | (England) Blackburn Rovers | £17,000,000 | 21 July 2003 |
| 10 | MF | (England) Joe Cole | (England) West Ham United | £6,600,000 | 6 August 2003 |
| 20 | MF | (Argentina) Juan Sebastián Verón | (England) Manchester United | £15,000,000 | 6 August 2003 |
| 7 | FW | (Romania) Adrian Mutu | (Italy) Parma | £15,800,000 | 12 August 2003 |
| 5 | MF | (Russia) Alexey Smertin | (France) Bordeaux | £3,450,000 | 25 August 2003 |
| 21 | FW | (Argentina) Hernán Crespo | (Italy) Inter Milan | £16,800,000 | 26 August 2003 |
| 34 | GK | (Scotland) Neil Sullivan | (England) Tottenham Hotspur | £500,000 | 29 August 2003 |
| 4 | MF | (France) Claude Makélélé | (Spain) Real Madrid | £16,000,000 | 31 August 2003 |
| 19 | MF | (England) Scott Parker | (England) Charlton Athletic | £10,000,000 | 30 January 2004 |

=== Out ===
| # | Pos | Player | To | Fee | Date |
|---|---|---|---|---|---|
| 17 | DF | (Spain) Albert Ferrer | Unattached | Released | 3 June 2003 |
| 25 | FW | (Italy) Gianfranco Zola | (Italy) Cagliari | Free | 2 July 2003 |
| 20 | MF | (England) Jody Morris | (England) Leeds United | Free | 18 July 2003 |
| 14 | DF | (England) Graeme Le Saux | (England) Southampton | £500,000 | 21 July 2003 |
| 1 | GK | (Netherlands) Ed de Goey | (England) Stoke City | Free | 1 August 2003 |

=== Overall transfer activity ===
==== Total Spending ====
Summer: ▼£111,150,000

Winter: £10,000,000

Total: ▼£121,150,000

==== Income ====
Summer: ▲£500,000

Winter: £0

Total: ▲£500,000

==== Expenditure ====
Summer: ▼£110,650,000

Winter: ▼£10,000,000

Total: ▼£120,650,000

== Competitions ==
=== Premier League ===
==== League table ====
| Pos | Team | Pld | W | D | L | GF | GA | GD | Pts | Qualification or relegation |
|---|---|---|---|---|---|---|---|---|---|---|
| 1 | Arsenal (C) | 38 | 26 | 12 | 0 | 73 | 26 | +47 | 90 | Qualification for the Champions League group stage |
| 2 | Chelsea | 38 | 24 | 7 | 7 | 67 | 30 | +37 | 79 | Qualification for the Champions League group stage |
| 3 | Manchester United | 38 | 23 | 6 | 9 | 64 | 35 | +29 | 75 | Qualification for the Champions League third qualifying round (Note: Since Manchester United qualified for the Champions League, their place in the UEFA Cup as 2003–04 FA Cup winners went to First Division club Millwall, who were the FA Cup runners-up.) |
| 4 | Liverpool | 38 | 16 | 12 | 10 | 55 | 37 | +18 | 60 | Qualification for the Champions League third qualifying round |
| 5 | Newcastle United | 38 | 13 | 17 | 8 | 52 | 40 | +12 | 56 | Qualification for the UEFA Cup first round |

Source: Premier League
Rules for classification: 1) points; 2) goal difference; 3) number of goals scored.
(C) Champions

==== Results summary ====
| Overall | | | | | | | | Home | | | | | | Away | | | | | |
| Pld | W | D | L | GF | GA | GD | Pts | W | D | L | GF | GA | GD | W | D | L | GF | GA | GD |
|---|---|---|---|---|---|---|---|---|---|---|---|---|---|---|---|---|---|---|---|
| 38 | 24 | 7 | 7 | 67 | 30 | +37 | 79 | 12 | 4 | 3 | 34 | 13 | +21 | 12 | 3 | 4 | 33 | 17 | +16 |

Last updated: 10 November 2014.
Source: ESPN

==== Matches ====
| 17 August 2003 1 | Liverpool | 1–2 | Chelsea | Liverpool |
| 16:05 BST (UTC+01) | Owen 79' (pen.) | Report | Verón 25'; Hasselbaink 87' | Stadium: Anfield; Attendance: 44,082; Referee: Steve Bennett |

| 23 August 2003 2 | Chelsea | 2–1 | Leicester City | London |
| 15:00 BST (UTC+01) | Nalis 2' (o.g.); Mutu 45'; Geremi (red card) 67' | Report | Scowcroft 40'; Rogers (red card) 84'; Scimeca (red card) 88' | Stadium: Stamford Bridge; Attendance: 41,073; Referee: Rob Styles |

| 30 August 2003 3 | Chelsea | 2–2 | Blackburn Rovers | London |
| 15:00 BST (UTC+01) | Mutu 45'; Hasselbaink 63' (pen.) | Report | Cole 1', 58' | Stadium: Stamford Bridge; Attendance: 41,066; Referee: Mike Dean |

| 13 September 2003 4 | Chelsea | 4–2 | Tottenham Hotspur | London |
| 15:00 BST (UTC+01) | Lampard 34'; Mutu 37', 75'; Hasselbaink 90' | Report | Kanouté 25', 87' | Stadium: Stamford Bridge; Attendance: 41,165; Referee: Graham Poll |

| 20 September 2003 5 | Wolverhampton Wanderers | 0–5 | Chelsea | Wolverhampton |
| 12:30 BST (UTC+01) | | Report | Lampard 17'; Hasselbaink 36'; Duff 52'; Crespo 67', 90' | Stadium: Molineux; Attendance: 29,208; Referee: Matt Messias |

| 27 September 2003 6 | Chelsea | 1–0 | Aston Villa | London |
| 15:00 BST (UTC+01) | Hasselbaink 43' | Report | | Stadium: Stamford Bridge; Attendance: 41,182; Referee: Jeff Winter |

| 5 October 2003 7 | Middlesbrough | 1–2 | Chelsea | Middlesbrough |
| 14:00 BST (UTC+01) | Németh 46' | Report | Guðjohnsen 17'; Crespo 88' | Stadium: Riverside Stadium; Attendance: 29,170; Referee: Mark Halsey |

| 14 October 2003 8 | Birmingham City | 0–0 | Chelsea | Birmingham |
| 19:45 BST (UTC+01) | | Report | | Stadium: St Andrew's; Attendance: 29,460; Referee: Neale Barry |

| 18 October 2003 9 | Arsenal | 2–1 | Chelsea | London |
| 15:00 BST (UTC+01) | Edu 4'; Henry 75' | Report | Crespo 7' | Stadium: Highbury; Attendance: 38,172; Referee: Paul Durkin |

| 25 October 2003 10 | Chelsea | 1–0 | Manchester City | London |
| 15:00 BST (UTC+01) | Hasselbaink 34' | Report | | Stadium: Stamford Bridge; Attendance: 41,040; Referee: Phil Dowd |

| 1 November 2003 11 | Everton | 0–1 | Chelsea | Liverpool |
| 15:00 GMT (UTC+00) | | Report | Mutu 59' | Stadium: Goodison Park; Attendance: 40,189; Referee: Jeff Winter |

| 9 November 2003 12 | Chelsea | 5–0 | Newcastle United | London |
| 16:05 GMT (UTC+00) | Johnson 25'; Crespo 40'; Lampard 42' (pen.); Duff 78'; Guðjohnsen 84' | Report | O'Brien (red card) | Stadium: Stamford Bridge; Attendance: 41,332; Referee: Paul Durkin |

| 22 November 2003 13 | Southampton | 0–1 | Chelsea | Southampton |
| | | Report | Melchiot 47' | Stadium: St. Mary's Stadium; Attendance: 32,149; Referee: Dermot Gallagher |

| 30 November 2003 14 | Chelsea | 1–0 | Manchester United | London |
| | Lampard 30' (pen.) | Report | | Stadium: Stamford Bridge; Attendance: 41,932; Referee: Alan Wiley |

| 6 December 2003 15 | Leeds United | 1–1 | Chelsea | Leeds |
| | Pennant 18' | Report | Duff 70' | Stadium: Elland Road; Attendance: 36,305; Referee: Mike Dean |

| 13 December 2003 16 | Chelsea | 1–2 | Bolton Wanderers | London |
| | Crespo 22' | Report | Ngotty 39'; Terry 90' (o.g.) | Stadium: Stamford Bridge; Attendance: 40,491; Referee: Matt Messias |

| 20 December 2003 17 | Fulham | 0–1 | Chelsea | London |
| 20:00 | | Report | Crespo 62' | Stadium: Loftus Road; Attendance: 18,244; Referee: Alan Wiley |

| 26 December 2003 18 | Charlton Athletic | 4–2 | Chelsea | London |
| 15:00 | Hreidarsson 1'; Holland 35'; Johansson 48'; Euell 53' | Report | Terry 10'; Guðjohnsen 76' | Stadium: The Valley; Attendance: 26,768; Referee: Graham Poll |

| 28 December 2003 19 | Chelsea | 3–0 | Portsmouth | London |
| | Bridge 65'; Lampard 73'; Geremi 82' | Report | | Stadium: Stamford Bridge; Attendance: 41,552; Referee: Graham Barber |

| 7 January 2004 20 | Chelsea | 0–1 | Liverpool | London |
| | | Report | Cheyrou 38'; Diouf (red card) | Stadium: Stamford Bridge; Attendance: 41,420; Referee: Steve Dunn |

| 11 January 2004 21 | Leicester City | 0–4 | Chelsea | Leicester |
| | | Report | Hasselbaink 12', 44'; Mutu 85'; Babayaro 90' | Stadium: Walkers Stadium; Attendance: 31,547; Referee: Uriah Rennie |

| 18 January 2004 22 | Chelsea | 0–0 | Birmingham City | London |
| 16:05 GMT (UTC) | | Report | | Stadium: Stamford Bridge; Attendance: 41,073; Referee: Jeff Winter |

| 1 February 2004 23 | Blackburn Rovers | 2–3 | Chelsea | Blackburn |
| | Flitcroft 3'; Gallagher 87' | Report | Lampard 25', 35'; Johnson 88' | Stadium: Ewood Park; Attendance: 24,867; Referee: Dermot Gallagher |

| 8 February 2004 24 | Chelsea | 1–0 | Charlton Athletic | London |
| 16:05 GMT | Hasselbaink 28' (pen.) | Report | | Stadium: Stamford Bridge; Attendance: 41,255; Referee: Steve Bennett |

| 11 February 2004 25 | Portsmouth | 0–2 | Chelsea | Portsmouth |
| | | Report | Parker 17'; Crespo 79' | Stadium: Fratton Park; Attendance: 20,140; Referee: Graham Poll |

| 21 February 2004 26 | Chelsea | 1–2 | Arsenal | London |
| 12:30 GMT | Guðjohnsen 1' (red card) 60' | Report | Vieira 15'; Edu 21' | Stadium: Stamford Bridge; Attendance: 41,847; Referee: Mike Riley |

| 28 February 2004 27 | Manchester City | 0–1 | Chelsea | Manchester |
| 15:00 | | Report | Guðjohnsen 82' | Stadium: City of Manchester Stadium; Attendance: 47,304; Referee: Rob Styles |

| 13 March 2004 28 | Bolton Wanderers | 0–2 | Chelsea | Bolton |
| | | Report | Terry 71'; Duff 74' | Stadium: Reebok Stadium; Referee: Graham Poll |

| 20 March 2004 29 | Chelsea | 2–1 | Fulham | London |
| | Guðjohnsen 7'; Duff 30' | Report | Pembridge 19' | Stadium: Stamford Bridge; Attendance: 41,169; Referee: Neale Barry |

| 27 March 2004 30 | Chelsea | 5–2 | Wolverhampton Wanderers | London |
| 15:00 GMT | Melchiot 4'; Lampard 70'; Hasselbaink 77', 87', 90' | Report | Camara 23'; Craddock 57' | Stadium: Stamford Bridge; Attendance: 41,215; Referee: Graham Barber |

| 3 April 2004 31 | Tottenham Hotspur | 0–1 | Chelsea | London |
| | | Report | Hasselbaink 38' | Stadium: White Hart Lane; Attendance: 36,101; Referee: Steve Bennett |

| 10 April 2004 32 | Chelsea | 0–0 | Middlesbrough | London |
| | | Report | | Stadium: Stamford Bridge; Attendance: 40,873; Referee: Mark Halsey |

| 12 April 2004 33 | Aston Villa | 3–2 | Chelsea | Birmingham |
| | Vassell 39' (pen.); Hitzlsperger 49'; Hendrie 52' | Report | Crespo 11', 90' | Stadium: Villa Park; Attendance: 41,112; Referee: Jeff Winter |

| 17 April 2004 34 | Chelsea | 0–0 | Everton | London |
| | | Report | | Stadium: Stamford Bridge; Attendance: 41,169; Referee: Graham Poll |

| 25 April 2004 35 | Newcastle United | 2–1 | Chelsea | Newcastle upon Tyne |
| 14:00 | Ameobi 44'; Shearer 48' | Report | Cole 5' | Stadium: St James' Park; Attendance: 52,016; Referee: Rob Styles |

| 1 May 2004 36 | Chelsea | 4–0 | Southampton | London |
| | Cranie 59' (o.g.); Lampard 75', 83'; Johnson 86' | Report | | Stadium: Stamford Bridge; Attendance: 41,321; Referee: Paul Durkin |

| 8 May 2004 37 | Manchester United | 1–1 | Chelsea | Manchester |
| | van Nistelrooy 77' | Report | Grønkjær 19'; Huth (red card) | Stadium: Old Trafford; Attendance: 67,609; Referee: Steve Bennett |

| 15 May 2004 38 | Chelsea | 1–0 | Leeds United | London |
| | Grønkjær 20' | Report | | Stadium: Stamford Bridge; Attendance: 41,276; Referee: Mike Dean |

=== UEFA Champions League ===
==== Third qualifying round ====
| 13 August 2003 First leg | Žilina (Slovakia) | 0–2 | (England) Chelsea | Žilina, Slovakia |
| 20:15 | | Report | Guðjohnsen 42'; Drahno 76' (o.g.) | Stadium: Štadión pod Dubňom; Attendance: 6,160; Referee: René Temmink (Netherlands) |

| 26 August 2003 Second leg | Chelsea (England) | 3–0 (5–0 agg.) | (Slovakia) Žilina | London, England |
| 19:45 | Johnson 32'; Huth 67'; Hasselbaink 79' | Report | | Stadium: Stamford Bridge; Attendance: 23,408; Referee: Kyros Vassaras (Greece) |

==== Group stage ====
| Pos | Team | Pld | W | D | L | GF | GA | GD | Pts | Qualification | CHE | SPP | BES | LAZ |
|---|---|---|---|---|---|---|---|---|---|---|---|---|---|---|
| 1 | (England) Chelsea | 6 | 4 | 1 | 1 | 9 | 3 | +6 | 13 | Advance to knockout stage | — | 0–0 | 0–2 | 2–1 |
| 2 | (Czech Republic) Sparta Prague | 6 | 2 | 2 | 2 | 5 | 5 | 0 | 8 | Advance to knockout stage | 0–1 | — | 2–1 | 1–0 |
| 3 | (Turkey) Beşiktaş | 6 | 2 | 1 | 3 | 5 | 7 | −2 | 7 | Transfer to UEFA Cup | 0–2 | 1–0 | — | 0–2 |
| 4 | (Italy) Lazio | 6 | 1 | 2 | 3 | 6 | 10 | −4 | 5 | | 0–4 | 2–2 | 1–1 | — |

Source: RSSSF

| 16 September 2003 1 | Sparta Prague (Czech Republic) | 0–1 | (England) Chelsea | Prague, Czech Republic |
| 20:45 | | Report | Gallas 85' | Stadium: Stadion Letná; Attendance: 18,997; Referee: Helmut Fleischer (Germany) |

| 1 October 2003 2 | Chelsea (England) | 0–2 | (Turkey) Beşiktaş | London, England |
| 20:45 | | Report | Yalçın 24', 29' | Stadium: Stamford Bridge; Attendance: 32,957; Referee: Lucilio Cardoso Cortez Batista (Portugal) |

| 22 October 2003 3 | Chelsea (England) | 2–1 | (Italy) Lazio | London, England |
| 20:45 | Lampard 57'; Mutu 65' | Report | Inzaghi 38' | Stadium: Stamford Bridge; Attendance: 40,405; Referee: Terje Hauge (Norway) |

| 4 November 2003 4 | Lazio (Italy) | 0–4 | (England) Chelsea | Rome, Italy |
| 20:45 | | Report | Crespo 15'; Guðjohnsen 70'; Duff 75'; Lampard 80' | Stadium: Stadio Olimpico; Attendance: 50,000; Referee: Valentin Ivanov (Russia) |

| 26 November 2003 5 | Chelsea (England) | 0–0 | (Czech Republic) Sparta Prague | London, England |
| 20:45 | | Report | | Stadium: Stamford Bridge; Attendance: 40,152; Referee: Claus Bo Larsen (Denmark) |

| 9 December 2003 6 | Beşiktaş (Turkey) | 0–2 | (England) Chelsea | Gelsenkirchen, Germany |
| 20:45 | | Report | Hasselbaink 77'; Bridge 85' | Stadium: Veltins-Arena; Attendance: 55,350; Referee: Anders Frisk (Sweden) |

==== Knockout phase ====
===== Round of 16 =====
| 25 February 2004 First leg | Stuttgart (Germany) | 0–1 | (England) Chelsea | Stuttgart, Germany |
| 20:45 | | Report | Meira 12' (o.g.) | Stadium: Gottlieb-Daimler-Stadion; Attendance: 50,000; Referee: Kyros Vassaras (Greece) |

| 9 March 2004 Second leg | Chelsea (England) | 0–0 (1–0 agg.) | (Germany) Stuttgart | London, England |
| 20:45 | | Report | | Stadium: Stamford Bridge; Attendance: 36,660; Referee: Kim Milton Nielsen (Denmark) |

===== Quarter-finals =====
| 24 March 2004 First leg | Chelsea (England) | 1–1 | (England) Arsenal | London, England |
| 20:45 | Guðjohnsen 53' | Report | Pires 59' | Stadium: Stamford Bridge; Attendance: 40,778; Referee: Manuel Mejuto González (Spain) |

| 6 April 2004 Second leg | Arsenal (England) | 1–2 (2–3 agg.) | (England) Chelsea | London, England |
| 20:45 | Reyes 45+1' | Report | Lampard 51'; Bridge 87' | Stadium: Highbury; Attendance: 35,468; Referee: Markus Merk (Germany) |

===== Semi-finals =====
| 20 April 2004 First leg | AS Monaco (France) | 3–1 | (England) Chelsea | Monaco |
| 20:45 | Pršo 17'; Morientes 78'; Nonda 83' | Report | Crespo 22' | Stadium: Stade Louis II; Attendance: 15,500; Referee: Urs Meier (Switzerland) |

| 5 May 2004 Second leg | Chelsea (England) | 2–2 (3–5 agg.) | (France) AS Monaco | London, England |
| 20:45 | Grønkjær 22'; Lampard 44' | Report | Ibarra 45+2'; Morientes 60' | Stadium: Stamford Bridge; Attendance: 37,132; Referee: Anders Frisk (Sweden) |

=== FA Cup ===
| 3 January 2004 Third round | Watford | 2–2 | Chelsea | Watford |
| 12:30 | Helguson 5'; Mahon 34' | Report | Guðjohnsen 33' (pen.); Lampard 41' | Stadium: Vicarage Road; Attendance: 21,121; Referee: Alan Wiley |

| 14 January 2004 Third round Replay | Chelsea | 4–0 | Watford | London |
| 19:45 | Mutu 7', 76'; Hasselbaink 34'; Guðjohnsen 84' | Report | | Stadium: Stamford Bridge; Attendance: 38,763; Referee: Alan Wiley |

| 24 January 2004 Fourth round | Scarborough | 0–1 | Chelsea | Scarborough |
| 12:30 | | Report | Terry 10' | Stadium: McCain Stadium; Attendance: 5,379; Referee: Barry Knight |

| 15 February 2004 Fifth round | Arsenal | 2–1 | Chelsea | London |
| 12:30 | Reyes 56', 61' | Report | Mutu 40' | Stadium: Highbury Stadium; Attendance: 38,136; Referee: Paul Durkin |

=== League Cup ===
| 29 October 2003 Third round | Chelsea | 4–2 | Notts County | London |
| | Hasselbaink 14'; Guðjohnsen 36', 65' (pen.); Cole 87' | Report | Barras 27'; Stallard 85' | Stadium: Stamford Bridge; Attendance: 35,997; Referee: Rob Styles |

| 3 December 2003 Fourth round | Reading | 0–1 | Chelsea | Reading |
| | | Report | Hasselbaink 57' | Stadium: Madejski Stadium; Attendance: 24,107; Referee: Steve Bennett |

| 17 December 2003 Quarter-finals | Aston Villa | 2–1 | Chelsea | Birmingham |
| 19:45 | Ángel 16'; McCann 78' | Report | Cole 69' | Stadium: Villa Park; Attendance: 30,414; Referee: Neale Barry |

== Statistics ==
| No. | Pos | Nat | Player | Total | | Premier League | | Champions League | | FA Cup | | Football League Cup | |
| No. | Pos | Nat | Player | Apps | Goals | Apps | Goals | Apps | Goals | Apps | Goals | Apps | Goals |
|---|---|---|---|---|---|---|---|---|---|---|---|---|---|
| 2 | DF | (England) ENG | Glen Johnson | 31 | 4 | 17+2 | 3 | 8+1 | 1 | 0 | 0 | 3 | 0 |
| 3 | DF | (Nigeria) NGR | Celestine Babayaro | 14 | 1 | 5+1 | 1 | 3 | 0 | 2 | 0 | 3 | 0 |
| 4 | MF | (France) FRA | Claude Makélélé | 46 | 0 | 26+4 | 0 | 11 | 0 | 3 | 0 | 1+1 | 0 |
| 6 | DF | (France) FRA | Marcel Desailly | 25 | 0 | 15 | 0 | 7+1 | 0 | 1 | 0 | 1 | 0 |
| 7 | FW | (Romania) ROU | Adrian Mutu | 36 | 10 | 21+4 | 6 | 6+1 | 1 | 3 | 3 | 0+1 | 0 |
| 8 | MF | (England) ENG | Frank Lampard | 58 | 15 | 38 | 10 | 13+1 | 4 | 4 | 1 | 1+1 | 0 |
| 9 | FW | (Netherlands) NED | Jimmy Floyd Hasselbaink | 44 | 18 | 22+8 | 13 | 4+4 | 2 | 3 | 1 | 3 | 2 |
| 10 | MF | (England) ENG | Joe Cole | 50 | 3 | 18+17 | 1 | 3+6 | 0 | 2+1 | 0 | 2+1 | 2 |
| 11 | MF | (Republic of Ireland) IRL | Damien Duff | 37 | 6 | 17+6 | 5 | 7+4 | 1 | 0+1 | 0 | 2 | 0 |
| 12 | MF | (Croatia) CRO | Mario Stanić | 5 | 0 | 0+2 | 0 | 0+1 | 0 | 0 | 0 | 0+2 | 0 |
| 13 | DF | (France) FRA | William Gallas | 45 | 1 | 23+6 | 0 | 11 | 1 | 4 | 0 | 1 | 0 |
| 14 | MF | (Cameroon) CMR | Geremi | 39 | 1 | 19+6 | 1 | 7+3 | 0 | 1 | 0 | 3 | 0 |
| 15 | DF | (Netherlands) NED | Mario Melchiot | 33 | 2 | 20+3 | 2 | 4+1 | 0 | 3 | 0 | 2 | 0 |
| 17 | MF | (France) FRA | Emmanuel Petit | 7 | 0 | 3+1 | 0 | 1+1 | 0 | 0+1 | 0 | 0 | 0 |
| 18 | DF | (England) ENG | Wayne Bridge | 48 | 3 | 33 | 1 | 11+2 | 2 | 2 | 0 | 0 | 0 |
| 19 | MF | (England) ENG | Scott Parker | 17 | 1 | 7+4 | 1 | 4+1 | 0 | 1 | 0 | 0 | 0 |
| 20 | MF | (Argentina) ARG | Juan Sebastián Verón | 14 | 1 | 5+2 | 1 | 5+1 | 0 | 0 | 0 | 1 | 0 |
| 21 | FW | (Argentina) ARG | Hernán Crespo | 31 | 12 | 13+6 | 10 | 7+3 | 2 | 0 | 0 | 1+1 | 0 |
| 22 | FW | (Iceland) ISL | Eiður Guðjohnsen | 41 | 13 | 17+9 | 6 | 8+2 | 3 | 2+2 | 2 | 1 | 2 |
| 23 | GK | (Italy) ITA | Carlo Cudicini | 40 | 0 | 26 | 0 | 11 | 0 | 3 | 0 | 0 | 0 |
| 26 | DF | (England) ENG | John Terry | 51 | 3 | 33 | 2 | 13 | 0 | 3 | 1 | 2 | 0 |
| 27 | MF | (Cyprus) CYP | Alexis Nicolas | 3 | 0 | 1+1 | 0 | 0 | 0 | 1 | 0 | 0 | 0 |
| 28 | MF | (Portugal) POR | Filipe Oliveira | 2 | 0 | 0+1 | 0 | 0 | 0 | 0+1 | 0 | 0 | 0 |
| 29 | DF | (Germany) GER | Robert Huth | 20 | 1 | 8+8 | 0 | 0+2 | 1 | 0+1 | 0 | 1 | 0 |
| 30 | MF | (Denmark) DEN | Jesper Grønkjær | 48 | 3 | 19+12 | 2 | 6+4 | 1 | 4 | 0 | 2+1 | 0 |
| 31 | GK | (Italy) ITA | Marco Ambrosio | 13 | 0 | 8 | 0 | 3 | 0 | 1 | 0 | 1 | 0 |
| 32 | FW | (Finland) FIN | Mikael Forssell | 1 | 0 | 0 | 0 | 1 | 0 | 0 | 0 | 0 | 0 |
| 34 | GK | (Scotland) SCO | Neil Sullivan | 8 | 0 | 4 | 0 | 0 | 0 | 1+1 | 0 | 2 | 0 |

Statistics taken from and . Squad details and shirt numbers from and .
