= 2003–04 Juventus FC season =

Italian football club season

Juventus
2003–04 season
- President: Franzo Grande Stevens
- Manager: Marcello Lippi
- Stadium: Stadio delle Alpi
- Serie A: 3rd
- Supercoppa Italiana: Winners
- Coppa Italia: Runners-up
- UEFA Champions League: Round of 16
- Top goalscorer: League: David Trezeguet (16); All: David Trezeguet (22)
- Average home league attendance: 35,109
| Home colours | Away colours | Third colours |

The 2003–04 season was Juventus's 106th in existence and 102nd consecutive season in the top flight of Italian football.

== Players ==
=== Squad information ===
Note: Flags indicate national team as defined under FIFA eligibility rules; some limited exceptions apply. Players may hold more than one non-FIFA nationality.

| No. | Pos. | Nation | Player |
|---|---|---|---|
| 1 | GK | ITA | Gianluigi Buffon |
| 2 | DF | ITA | Ciro Ferrara |
| 3 | MF | ITA | Alessio Tacchinardi |
| 4 | DF | URU | Paolo Montero |
| 5 | DF | CRO | Igor Tudor |
| 6 | DF | ITA | Salvatore Fresi |
| 7 | DF | ITA | Gianluca Pessotto |
| 8 | MF | ITA | Antonio Conte |
| 9 | FW | ITA | Fabrizio Miccoli |
| 10 | FW | ITA | Alessandro Del Piero |
| 11 | MF | CZE | Pavel Nedvěd |
| 12 | GK | ITA | Antonio Chimenti |
| 13 | DF | ITA | Mark Iuliano |
| 14 | MF | ITA | Enzo Maresca |
| 15 | DF | ITA | Alessandro Birindelli |
| 16 | MF | ARG | Mauro Camoranesi |
| 17 | FW | FRA | David Trezeguet |

| No. | Pos. | Nation | Player |
|---|---|---|---|
| 18 | MF | GHA | Stephen Appiah |
| 19 | DF | ITA | Gianluca Zambrotta |
| 20 | FW | ITA | Marco Di Vaio |
| 21 | DF | FRA | Lilian Thuram |
| 22 | GK | ITA | Antonio Mirante |
| 23 | DF | ITA | Nicola Legrottaglie |
| 27 | MF | ITA | Davide Baiocco |
| 31 | DF | ITA | Orlando Urbano |
| 32 | MF | RUS | Viktor Budyanskiy |
| 34 | FW | SUI | Davide Chiumiento |
| 36 | MF | ITA | Luca Scicchitano |
| 41 | FW | NGR | Benjamin Onwuachi |
| 42 | DF | ITA | Giovanni Bartolucci |
| 43 | MF | FRA | Abdoulay Konko |
| 44 | DF | ITA | Andrea Masiello |
| 45 | FW | ITA | Raffaele Palladino |
| 50 | GK | ITA | Nicola Avitabile |

=== Transfers ===
In
| Pos. | Name | from | Type |
|---|---|---|---|
| FW | Marco Di Vaio | Parma | €14 million |
| MF | Stephen Appiah | Brescia | €8 million |
| DF | Nicola Legrottaglie | Chievo | €7.55 million |
| FW | Fabrizio Miccoli | Perugia | loan ended |
| MF | Enzo Maresca | Piacenza | loan ended |
| MF | Manuele Blasi | Perugia | loan ended |

Out
| Pos. | Name | to | Type |
|---|---|---|---|
| GK | Fabián Carini | Standard Liege | loan |
| MF | Christian Zenoni | Sampdoria | loan |
| DF | Emiliano Moretti | Parma | |
| MF | Davide Baiocco | Reggina | loan |
| FW | Marcelo Salas | River Plate | loan |
| MF | Manuele Blasi | Parma | loan |

==== Left club during season ====
Note: Flags indicate national team as defined under FIFA eligibility rules; some limited exceptions apply. Players may hold more than one non-FIFA nationality.

| No. | Pos. | Nation | Player |
|---|---|---|---|
| 26 | MF | NED | Edgar Davids (on loan to Barcelona) |
| 6 | DF | ITA | Salvatore Fresi (on loan to Perugia) |
| 25 | FW | URU | Marcelo Zalayeta (on loan to Perugia) |
| 24 | MF | URU | Ruben Olivera (on loan to Atletico Madrid) |

== Competitions ==
=== Supercoppa Italiana ===
| 3 August 2003 | Juventus | 1–1 (a.e.t.) (5–3 p) | AC Milan | East Rutherford, New Jersey, United States |
| 22:00 CEST (UTC+02:00) | Trezeguet 105+3' | Report | Pirlo 105+2' (pen.) | Stadium: Giants Stadium; Attendance: 54,128; Referee: Pierluigi Collina |
| | Penalties |
| | Di Vaio (penalty scored); Trezeguet (penalty scored); Birindelli (penalty scored); Camoranesi (penalty scored); Ferrara (penalty scored) | | (penalty scored) Pirlo; (penalty missed) Serginho; (penalty scored) Brocchi; (penalty scored) Nesta |

=== Serie A ===
==== League table ====
| Pos | Team | Pld | W | D | L | GF | GA | GD | Pts | Qualification or relegation |
|---|---|---|---|---|---|---|---|---|---|---|
| 1 | Milan (C) | 34 | 25 | 7 | 2 | 65 | 24 | +41 | 82 | Qualification to Champions League group stage |
| 2 | Roma | 34 | 21 | 8 | 5 | 68 | 19 | +49 | 71 | Qualification to Champions League group stage |
| 3 | Juventus | 34 | 21 | 6 | 7 | 67 | 42 | +25 | 69 | Qualification to Champions League third qualifying round |
| 4 | Internazionale | 34 | 17 | 8 | 9 | 59 | 37 | +22 | 59 | Qualification to Champions League third qualifying round |
| 5 | Parma | 34 | 16 | 10 | 8 | 57 | 46 | +11 | 58 | Qualification to UEFA Cup first round |

Source: Almanacco Illustrato del Calcio – La Storia 1898-2004, Panini Edizioni, Modena, September 2005
Rules for classification: 1) points; 2) tiebreaker for relevant positions 3) head-to-head points and goal difference; 4) head-to-head goals scored; 5) goal difference; 6) number of goals scored.
(C) Champions

==== Results summary ====
| Overall | | | | | | | | Home | | | | | | Away | | | | | |
| Pld | W | D | L | GF | GA | GD | Pts | W | D | L | GF | GA | GD | W | D | L | GF | GA | GD |
|---|---|---|---|---|---|---|---|---|---|---|---|---|---|---|---|---|---|---|---|
| 34 | 21 | 6 | 7 | 67 | 42 | +25 | 69 | 13 | 1 | 3 | 40 | 18 | +22 | 8 | 5 | 4 | 27 | 24 | +3 |

Last updated: 16 May 2004.
Source: Competitive matches

==== Results by round ====
| Round | 1 | 2 | 3 | 4 | 5 | 6 | 7 | 8 | 9 | 10 | 11 | 12 | 13 | 14 | 15 | 16 | 17 | 18 | 19 | 20 | 21 | 22 | 23 | 24 | 25 | 26 | 27 | 28 | 29 | 30 | 31 | 32 | 33 | 34 |
|---|---|---|---|---|---|---|---|---|---|---|---|---|---|---|---|---|---|---|---|---|---|---|---|---|---|---|---|---|---|---|---|---|---|---|
| Ground | H | A | H | A | H | A | H | A | H | A | H | A | H | A | H | A | H | A | H | A | H | A | H | A | H | A | H | A | H | A | H | A | H | A |
| Result | W | W | D | W | W | W | W | D | W | W | L | L | W | D | W | W | W | D | W | L | W | W | W | W | L | D | W | L | W | D | L | L | W | W |
| Position | 1 | 2 | 2 | 2 | 1 | 1 | 2 | 2 | 1 | 1 | 3 | 3 | 3 | 3 | 3 | 3 | 3 | 3 | 3 | 3 | 3 | 3 | 3 | 3 | 3 | 3 | 2 | 3 | 3 | 3 | 3 | 3 | 3 | 3 |

Source: Competitive matches
A = Away; H = Home; W = Win; D = Draw; L = Loss; = Leader, UEFA Champions League Groups stage; = UEFA Champions League Groups stage; = UEFA Champions League Qualifying round; = 2004–05 UEFA Cup; = 2004–05 Serie B

==== Matches ====
| 31 August 2003 1 | Juventus | 5–1 | Empoli | Turin |
| 15:00 CEST (UTC+02:00) | Del Piero 16', 51'; Trezeguet 61', 74'; Di Vaio 85' (pen.) | Report | Di Natale 88' | Stadium: Stadio delle Alpi; Attendance: 30,962; Referee: Emilio Pellegrino |

| 14 September 2003 2 | Chievo | 1–2 | Juventus | Verona |
| 20:30 CEST (UTC+02:00) | D'Anna 21' (pen.) | Report | Legrottaglie 26'; Trezeguet 49' | Stadium: Stadio Marc'Antonio Bentegodi; Attendance: 34,624; Referee: Matteo Trefoloni |

| 21 September 2003 3 | Juventus | 2–2 | Roma | Turin |
| 20:30 CEST (UTC+02:00) | Di Vaio 21', 35' | Report | Chivu 25'; Zebina 87' | Stadium: Stadio delle Alpi; Attendance: 43,042; Referee: Emilio Pellegrino |

| 27 September 2003 4 | Reggina | 0–2 | Juventus | Reggio Calabria |
| 18:00 CEST (UTC+02:00) | | Report | Di Vaio 13'; Nedvěd 49' | Stadium: Stadio Oreste Granillo; Attendance: 24,082; Referee: Salvatore Racalbuto |

| 5 October 2003 5 | Juventus | 2–1 | Bologna | Turin |
| 15:00 CEST (UTC+02:00) | Iuliano 23'; Trezeguet 80' (pen.) | Report | Signori 26' (pen.) | Stadium: Stadio delle Alpi; Attendance: 31,493; Referee: Gianluca Paparesta |

| 18 October 2003 6 | Ancona | 2–3 | Juventus | Ancona |
| 20:30 CEST (UTC+02:00) | Viali 57'; Ganz 90+1' | Report | Miccoli 29', 49'; Zambrotta 44' | Stadium: Stadio del Conero; Attendance: 23,306; Referee: Emilio Pellegrino |

| 26 October 2003 7 | Juventus | 2–0 | Brescia | Turin |
| 15:00 CET (UTC+01:00) | Nedvěd 6'; Trezeguet 45' | Report | | Stadium: Stadio delle Alpi; Attendance: 32,360; Referee: Gianluca Paparesta |

| 1 November 2003 8 | AC Milan | 1–1 | Juventus | Milan |
| 20:30 CET (UTC+01:00) | Tomasson 65' | Report | Di Vaio 84' | Stadium: San Siro; Attendance: 77,921; Referee: Salvatore Racalbuto |

| 9 November 2003 9 | Juventus | 4–1 | Udinese | Turin |
| 15:00 CET (UTC+01:00) | Di Vaio 79', 88'; Miccoli 85'; Trezeguet 90+5' | Report | Jankulovski 66' (pen.) | Stadium: Stadio delle Alpi; Attendance: 31,418; Referee: Tiziano Pieri |

| 22 November 2003 10 | Modena | 0–2 | Juventus | Modena |
| 18:00 CET (UTC+01:00) | | Report | Trezeguet 42'; Nedvěd 50' | Stadium: Stadio Alberto Braglia; Attendance: 18,748; Referee: Marco Gabriele |

| 29 November 2003 11 | Juventus | 1–3 | Internazionale | Turin |
| 20:30 CET (UTC+01:00) | Montero 90' | Report | Cruz 12', 68'; Martins 77' | Stadium: Stadio delle Alpi; Attendance: 53,883; Referee: Matteo Trefoloni |

| 6 December 2003 12 | Lazio | 2–0 | Juventus | Rome |
| 20:30 CET (UTC+01:00) | Corradi 21'; Fiore 45+3' | Report | | Stadium: Stadio Olimpico; Attendance: 60,929; Referee: Cosimo Bolognino |

| 14 December 2003 13 | Juventus | 4–0 | Parma | Turin |
| 15:00 CET (UTC+01:00) | Miccoli 10', 32'; Del Piero 71'; Nedvěd 72' | Report | | Stadium: Stadio delle Alpi; Attendance: 31,768; Referee: Gianluca Paparesta |

| 21 December 2003 14 | Lecce | 1–1 | Juventus | Lecce |
| 15:00 CET (UTC+01:00) | Konan 24' | Report | Trezeguet 87' | Stadium: Stadio Via del Mare; Attendance: 30,625; Referee: Emilio Pellegrino |

| 6 January 2004 15 | Juventus | 1–0 | Perugia | Turin |
| 15:00 CET (UTC+01:00) | Nedvěd 29' | Report | | Stadium: Stadio delle Alpi; Attendance: 31,029; Referee: Salvatore Racalbuto |

| 11 January 2004 16 | Sampdoria | 1–2 | Juventus | Genoa |
| 15:00 CET (UTC+01:00) | Flachi 56' | Report | Camoranesi 24'; Conte 74' | Stadium: Stadio Luigi Ferraris; Attendance: 35,557; Referee: Matteo Trefoloni |

| 18 January 2004 17 | Juventus | 4–2 | Siena | Turin |
| 15:00 CET (UTC+01:00) | Del Piero 15' (pen.), 59' (pen.), 64'; Trezeguet 37' | Report | Ventola 71' (pen.), 80' | Stadium: Stadio delle Alpi; Attendance: 30,974; Referee: Cosimo Bolognino |

| 25 January 2004 18 | Empoli | 3–3 | Juventus | Empoli |
| 20:30 CET (UTC+01:00) | Rocchi 21', 55', 62' | Report | Trezeguet 30', 50', 75' | Stadium: Stadio Carlo Castellani; Attendance: 16,186; Referee: Massimo De Santis |

| 1 February 2004 19 | Juventus | 1–0 | Chievo | Turin |
| 15:00 CET (UTC+01:00) | Camoranesi 10' | Report | | Stadium: Stadio delle Alpi; Attendance: 30,078; Referee: Massimo De Santis |

| 8 February 2004 20 | Roma | 4–0 | Juventus | Rome |
| 20:30 CET (UTC+01:00) | Dacourt 13'; Totti 53' (pen.); Cassano 70', 85' | Report | | Stadium: Stadio Olimpico; Attendance: 73,325; Referee: Pierluigi Collina |

| 15 February 2004 21 | Juventus | 1–0 | Reggina | Turin |
| 20:30 CET (UTC+01:00) | Maresca 51' | Report | | Stadium: Stadio delle Alpi; Attendance: 30,116; Referee: Paolo Bertini |

| 22 February 2004 22 | Bologna | 0–1 | Juventus | Bologna |
| 15:00 CET (UTC+01:00) | | Report | Iuliano 56' | Stadium: Stadio Renato Dall'Ara; Attendance: 33,782; Referee: Gianluca Paparesta |

| 29 February 2004 23 | Juventus | 3–0 | Ancona | Turin |
| 15:00 CET (UTC+01:00) | Camoranesi 7'; Miccoli 41'; Del Piero 45+1' | Report | | Stadium: Stadio delle Alpi; Attendance: 29,864; Referee: Paolo Dondarini |

| 6 March 2004 24 | Brescia | 2–3 | Juventus | Brescia |
| 20:30 CET (UTC+01:00) | Mauri 3'; Caracciolo 39' | Report | Miccoli 53' (pen.); Di Vaio 55'; Nedvěd 75' | Stadium: Stadio Mario Rigamonti; Attendance: 20,407; Referee: Paolo Bertini |

| 14 March 2004 25 | Juventus | 1–3 | AC Milan | Turin |
| 20:30 CET (UTC+01:00) | Ferrara 81' | Report | Shevchenko 25'; Seedorf 63', 75' | Stadium: Stadio delle Alpi; Attendance: 52,300; Referee: Pierluigi Collina |

| 20 March 2004 26 | Udinese | 0–0 | Juventus | Udine |
| 18:00 CET (UTC+01:00) | | Report | | Stadium: Stadio Friuli; Attendance: 24,993; Referee: Tiziano Pieri |

| 28 March 2004 27 | Juventus | 3–1 | Modena | Turin |
| 15:00 CEST (UTC+02:00) | Maresca 57'; Trezeguet 64', 84' | Report | Marazzina 67' | Stadium: Stadio delle Alpi; Attendance: 30,666; Referee: Emilio Pellegrino |

| 4 April 2004 28 | Internazionale | 3–2 | Juventus | Milan |
| 20:30 CEST (UTC+02:00) | Martins 6'; Vieri 45' (pen.); Stanković 47' | Report | González 25' (o.g.); Di Vaio 90+3' | Stadium: San Siro; Attendance: 72,029; Referee: Pierluigi Collina |

| 10 April 2004 29 | Juventus | 1–0 | Lazio | Turin |
| 20:30 CEST (UTC+02:00) | Trezeguet 88' | Report | | Stadium: Stadio delle Alpi; Attendance: 31,190; Referee: Paolo Bertini |

| 18 April 2004 30 | Parma | 2–2 | Juventus | Parma |
| 15:00 CEST (UTC+02:00) | Carbone 35'; Gilardino 81' | Report | Di Vaio 78'; Tudor 90+2' | Stadium: Stadio Ennio Tardini; Attendance: 20,501; Referee: Matteo Trefoloni |

| 25 April 2004 31 | Juventus | 3–4 | Lecce | Turin |
| 15:00 CEST (UTC+02:00) | Trezeguet 3'; Maresca 56'; Del Piero 79' | Report | Franceschini 23'; Konan 30', 44'; Chevantón 52' | Stadium: Stadio delle Alpi; Attendance: 31,198; Referee: Gianluca Paparesta |

| 2 May 2004 32 | Perugia | 1–0 | Juventus | Perugia |
| 15:00 CEST (UTC+02:00) | Ravanelli 49' | Report | | Stadium: Stadio Renato Curi; Attendance: 11,108; Referee: Tiziano Pieri |

| 9 May 2004 33 | Juventus | 2–0 | Sampdoria | Turin |
| 15:00 CEST (UTC+02:00) | Legrottaglie 37'; Appiah 44' | Report | | Stadium: Stadio delle Alpi; Attendance: 31,866; Referee: Emidio Morganti |

| 16 May 2004 34 | Siena | 1–3 | Juventus | Siena |
| 15:00 CEST (UTC+02:00) | Flo 38' | Report | Tudor 32'; Miccoli 41'; Di Vaio 60' | Stadium: Stadio Artemio Franchi – Montepaschi Arena; Attendance: 13,031; Referee: Diego Preschern |

=== Coppa Italia ===
==== Round of 16 ====
| 25 November 2003 First leg | Siena | 1–2 | Juventus | Siena |
| 18:00 CET (UTC+01:00) | Rubino 26' | Report | Zalayeta 73'; Onwuachi 83' | Stadium: Stadio Artemio Franchi – Montepaschi Arena; Referee: Nicola Ayroldi |

| 18 December 2003 Second leg | Juventus | 2–1 (4–2 agg.) | Siena | Turin |
| 20:45 CET (UTC+01:00) | Del Piero 45'; Camoranesi 52' | Report | Ventola 54' (pen.) | Stadium: Stadio delle Alpi; Referee: Mauro Bergonzi |

==== Quarter-finals ====
| 15 January 2004 First leg | Perugia | 1–2 | Juventus | Perugia |
| 20:45 CET (UTC+01:00) | Manfredini 66' | Report | Zalayeta 45'; Di Vaio 89' | Stadium: Stadio Renato Curi; Referee: Paolo Bertini |

| 21 January 2004 Second leg | Juventus | 1–0 (3–1 agg.) | Perugia | Turin |
| 20:45 CET (UTC+01:00) | Miccoli 40' | Report | | Stadium: Stadio delle Alpi; Referee: Stefano Cassarà |

==== Semi-finals ====
| 4 February 2004 First leg | Juventus | 2–2 | Internazionale | Turin |
| 20:45 CET (UTC+01:00) | Di Vaio 7', 70' | Report | Adriano 3', 33' | Stadium: Stadio delle Alpi; Referee: Paolo Bertini |

| 12 February 2004 Second leg | Internazionale | 2–2 (a.e.t.) (4–4 agg.) (4–5 p) | Juventus | Milan |
| 20:45 CET (UTC+01:00) | Adriano 7'; Adani 90+5' | Report | Tudor 40'; Del Piero 78' | Stadium: San Siro; Referee: Emilio Pellegrino |
| | Penalties |
| | Farinós (penalty scored); Adriano (penalty scored); Stanković (penalty scored); Helveg (penalty scored); Vieri (penalty missed) | | (penalty scored) Del Piero; (penalty scored) Maresca; (penalty scored) Nedvěd; (penalty scored) Legrottaglie; (penalty scored) Miccoli |

==== Final ====
| 17 March 2004 First leg | Lazio | 2–0 | Juventus | Rome |
| 20:45 CET (UTC+01:00) | Fiore 59', 80' | Report | | Stadium: Stadio Olimpico; Referee: Pierluigi Collina |

| 12 May 2004 Second leg | Juventus | 2–2 (2–4 agg.) | Lazio | Turin |
| 20:45 CEST (UTC+02:00) | Trezeguet 20'; Del Piero 46' | Report | Corradi 69'; Fiore 83' | Stadium: Stadio delle Alpi; Referee: Gianluca Paparesta |

=== UEFA Champions League ===
==== Group stage ====
| Pos | Team | Pld | W | D | L | GF | GA | GD | Pts | Qualification | JUV | RSO | GAL | OLY |
|---|---|---|---|---|---|---|---|---|---|---|---|---|---|---|
| 1 | (Italy) Juventus | 6 | 4 | 1 | 1 | 15 | 6 | +9 | 13 | Advance to knockout stage | — | 4–2 | 2–1 | 7–0 |
| 2 | (Spain) Real Sociedad | 6 | 2 | 3 | 1 | 8 | 8 | 0 | 9 | Advance to knockout stage | 0–0 | — | 1–1 | 1–0 |
| 3 | (Turkey) Galatasaray | 6 | 2 | 1 | 3 | 6 | 8 | −2 | 7 | Transfer to UEFA Cup | 2–0 | 1–2 | — | 1–0 |
| 4 | (Greece) Olympiacos | 6 | 1 | 1 | 4 | 6 | 13 | −7 | 4 | | 1–2 | 2–2 | 3–0 | — |

Source: RSSSF

| 17 September 2003 1 | Juventus (Italy) | 2–1 | (Turkey) Galatasaray | Turin, Italy |
| 20:45 CEST (UTC+02:00) | Del Piero 5', 73' | Report | Şükür 19'; Sabri (yellow card) 86' | Stadium: Stadio delle Alpi; Referee: Valentin Ivanov (Russia) |

| 30 September 2003 2 | Olympiacos (Greece) | 1–2 | (Italy) Juventus | Athens, Greece |
| 20:45 CEST (UTC+02:00) | Stoltidis 11'; Castillo (yellow card) 40'; Gonias (yellow card) 70' | Report | Nedvěd 21', 79'; Davids (yellow card) 29'; Miccoli (yellow card) 85' | Stadium: Georgios Kamaras Stadium; Referee: Éric Poulat (France) |

| 21 October 2003 3 | Juventus (Italy) | 4–2 | (Spain) Real Sociedad | Turin, Italy |
| 20:45 CEST (UTC+02:00) | Trezeguet 3', 63'; Di Vaio 7', 45+1'; Tacchinardi (yellow card) 58'; Iuliano (yellow card) 71' | Report | Tudor 67' (o.g.); Alonso (yellow card) 70'; De Pedro 80' | Stadium: Stadio delle Alpi; Referee: Graham Poll (England) |

| 5 November 2003 4 | Real Sociedad (Spain) | 0–0 | (Italy) Juventus | San Sebastián, Spain |
| 20:45 CET (UTC+01:00) | Schürrer (yellow card) 34' | Report | Ferrara (yellow card) 12'; Conte (yellow card) 39'; Tudor (yellow card) 52'; Davids (yellow card) 66' | Stadium: Anoeta; Referee: Stéphane Bré (France) |

| 2 December 2003 5 | Galatasaray (Turkey) | 2–0 | (Italy) Juventus | Dortmund, Germany |
| 20:45 CET (UTC+01:00) | Şükür 47', 90+4'; Petre (yellow card) 51'; Şaş (yellow card) 90' | Report | Zalayeta (yellow card) 15'; Conte (yellow card) 15'; Di Vaio (yellow card) 55'; Maresca (yellow card) 62'; Davids (yellow card) 90+2' | Stadium: Westfalenstadion; Attendance: 44,045; Referee: Kim Milton Nielsen (Denmark) |
Note: The game was played in Dortmund, Germany, due to the security situation in Istanbul following the 2003 Istanbul bombings. The date was also changed from 25 November to 2 December.

| 10 December 2003 6 | Juventus (Italy) | 7–0 | (Greece) Olympiacos | Turin, Italy |
| 20:45 CET (UTC+01:00) | Trezeguet 14', 25'; Miccoli 19'; Maresca 28'; Di Vaio 62'; Del Piero 67'; Zalayeta 79' | Report | | Stadium: Stadio delle Alpi; Referee: Konrad Plautz (Austria) |

==== Knockout phase ====
===== Round of 16 =====
| 25 February 2004 First leg | Deportivo La Coruña (Spain) | 1–0 | (Italy) Juventus | A Coruña, Spain |
| 20:45 CET (UTC+01:00) | Luque 37'; Naybet (yellow card) 63' | Report | Conte (yellow card) 90+3' | Stadium: Estadio Riazor; Attendance: 28,000; Referee: Gilles Veissière (France) |

| 9 March 2004 Second leg | Juventus (Italy) | 0–1 (0–2 agg.) | (Spain) Deportivo La Coruña | Turin, Italy |
| 20:45 CET (UTC+01:00) | Tacchinardi (yellow card) 8'; Ferrara (yellow card) 55'; Montero (yellow card) 75' | Report | Pandiani 12'; Víctor (yellow card) 69'; Silva (yellow card) 74' | Stadium: Stadio delle Alpi; Attendance: 24,680; Referee: Ľuboš Micheľ (Slovakia) |

== Statistics ==
=== Players statistics ===
| No. | Pos | Nat | Player | Total | | Serie A | | Coppa Italia | | Champions League | |
| No. | Pos | Nat | Player | Apps | Goals | Apps | Goals | Apps | Goals | Apps | Goals |
|---|---|---|---|---|---|---|---|---|---|---|---|
| 1 | GK | (Italy) ITA | Buffon | 36 | -47 | 30 | -41 | 0 | 0 | 6 | -6 |
| 21 | DF | (France) FRA | Thuram | 32 | 0 | 23 | 0 | 4 | 0 | 5 | 0 |
| 23 | DF | (Italy) ITA | Legrottaglie | 30 | 2 | 21 | 2 | 6 | 0 | 3 | 0 |
| 4 | DF | (Uruguay) URU | Montero | 26 | 1 | 17+2 | 1 | 1 | 0 | 5+1 | 0 |
| 19 | DF | (Italy) ITA | Zambrotta | 41 | 1 | 29+1 | 1 | 6 | 0 | 4+1 | 0 |
| 16 | MF | (Argentina) ARG | Camoranesi | 35 | 4 | 22+4 | 3 | 5 | 1 | 3+1 | 0 |
| 3 | MF | (Italy) ITA | Tacchinardi | 33 | 0 | 22+2 | 0 | 3 | 0 | 5+1 | 0 |
| 18 | MF | (Ghana) GHA | Appiah | 45 | 1 | 25+5 | 1 | 8 | 0 | 5+2 | 0 |
| 11 | MF | (Czech Republic) CZE | Nedved | 40 | 8 | 28+2 | 6 | 4 | 0 | 6 | 2 |
| 17 | FW | (France) FRA | Trezeguet | 33 | 21 | 23+2 | 16 | 3 | 1 | 5 | 4 |
| 10 | FW | (Italy) ITA | Del Piero | 30 | 14 | 18+4 | 8 | 4 | 3 | 3+1 | 3 |
| 12 | GK | (Italy) ITA | Chimenti | 12 | -14 | 2 | -1 | 8 | -11 | 2 | -2 |
| 20 | FW | (Italy) ITA | Di Vaio | 43 | 17 | 15+14 | 11 | 7 | 3 | 5+2 | 3 |
| 2 | DF | (Italy) ITA | Ferrara | 25 | 1 | 15+2 | 1 | 4 | 0 | 4 | 0 |
| 15 | DF | (Italy) ITA | Birindelli | 27 | 0 | 14+5 | 0 | 3 | 0 | 2+3 | 0 |
| 14 | MF | (Italy) ITA | Maresca | 29 | 4 | 13+7 | 3 | 7 | 0 | 2 | 1 |
| 13 | DF | (Italy) ITA | Iuliano | 25 | 2 | 13+5 | 2 | 3 | 0 | 4 | 0 |
| 9 | FW | (Italy) ITA | Miccoli | 37 | 10 | 11+14 | 8 | 6 | 1 | 3+3 | 1 |
| 7 | DF | (Italy) ITA | Pessotto | 33 | 0 | 11+9 | 0 | 8 | 0 | 4+1 | 0 |
| 8 | MF | (Italy) ITA | Conte | 24 | 1 | 11+5 | 1 | 4 | 0 | 3+1 | 0 |
| 5 | DF | (Croatia) CRO | Tudor | 26 | 3 | 7+8 | 2 | 6 | 1 | 4+1 | 0 |
| 26 | DF | (Netherlands) NED | Davids | 12 | 0 | 4+1 | 0 | 2 | 0 | 3+2 | 0 |
| 25 | FW | (Uruguay) URU | Zalayeta | 9 | 3 | 0+2 | 0 | 4 | 2 | 2+1 | 1 |
| 34 | FW | (Switzerland) SUI | Chiumiento | 2 | 0 | 0+1 | 0 | 0 | 0 | 0+1 | 0 |
| 32 | MF | (Russia) RUS | Budyanskiy | 2 | 0 | 0+2 | 0 | | | | |
| 6 | DF | (Italy) ITA | Fresi | 1 | 0 | 0 | 0 | 1 | 0 | | |
| 24 | MF | (Uruguay) URU | Olivera | 1 | 0 | 0 | 0 | 1 | 0 | | |
| 22 | GK | (Italy) ITA | Mirante | 0 | 0 | 0 | 0 | 0 | 0 | | |
| 41 | FW | (Nigeria) NGR | Onwuachi | 1 | 1 | 0 | 0 | 1 | 1 | | |
| 27 | MF | (Italy) ITA | Baiocco | | | | | | | | |
| 31 | DF | (Italy) ITA | Urbano | | | | | | | | |
| 36 | MF | (Italy) ITA | Scicchitano | | | | | | | | |
| 42 | DF | (Italy) ITA | Bartolucci | 1 | 0 | 0 | 0 | 1 | 0 | | |
| 43 | MF | (France) FRA | Konko | | | | | | | | |
| 44 | DF | (Italy) ITA | Masiello | | | | | | | | |
| 45 | FW | (Italy) ITA | Palladino | 1 | 0 | 0 | 0 | 1 | 0 | | |
| 50 | GK | (Italy) ITA | Avitabile | | | | | | | | |

- Source: http://calcio-seriea.net/presenze/2003/1240/

=== Goalscorers ===
- (France) David Trezeguet 16
- (Italy) Marco Di Vaio 11
- (Italy) Fabrizio Miccoli 8
- (Italy) Alessandro Del Piero 8
- (Czech Republic) Pavel Nedvěd 6
