= Real Sociedad in European football =

Spanish club in European football

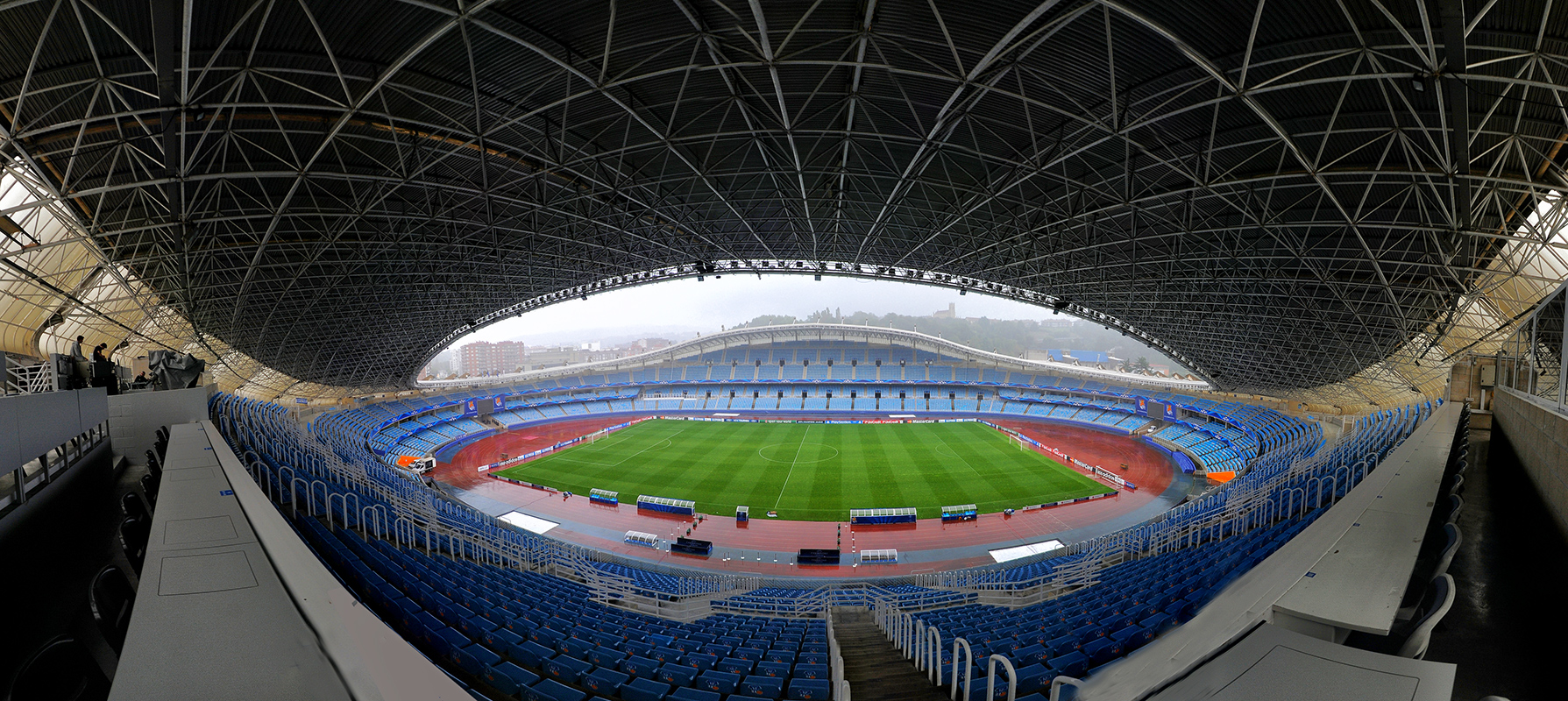
- Anoeta Stadium prior to a UEFA Champions League fixture, 2013
- Club: Real Sociedad
- Seasons played: 21
- First entry: 1974–75 UEFA Cup
- Latest entry: 2026–27 UEFA Europa League

Titles
- Champions League: 0 (Best: Semi-finals)
- Europa League: 0 (Best: Quarter-finals)
- Cup Winners' Cup: 0 (Best: Second round)

Real Sociedad is a football club from San Sebastián, Basque Country. They have entered European competitions representing Spain's La Liga on 21 occasions.

== Summary ==
The club have never appeared in a European final. Their best performance was in the 1982–83 European Cup when they reached the semi-finals, losing narrowly to eventual winners Hamburger SV.

La Real have thrice competed in the group stages of the UEFA Champions League. In 2003–04, they qualified directly as runners-up in the previous season's domestic league, and progressed from the group before being beaten by Lyon in the first knockout round. Ten years later, in 2013–14 – having played no other European football and spent three years in the second division in the interim – they were again paired with Lyon, this time in the playoff round, and gained revenge by eliminating them, but subsequently finished bottom of the section. They returned to the competition after a decade in 2023–24, and progressed past the group stage for the second time.

In 2017, the club competed in the UEFA Europa League groups for the first time after gaining entry directly to that stage, having fallen in the last qualification round three years earlier.

In 2020, La Real appeared to be heading out of the competition at the group stage in the 90th minute of the last matchday, before a goal in stoppage time against SSC Napoli earned them a point, while a goal at almost the same moment in the other fixture meant defeat and elimination for AZ Alkmaar who had been set to go through.

== Overall record ==
Accurate as of 17 September 2026

Competition	Pld	W	D	L	GF	GA	GD	Win%
European Cup / Champions League (5)	34	11	9	14	32	35	−3	32.35
UEFA Cup Winners' Cup (1)	4	1	3	0	3	1	+2	25.00
UEFA Cup / Europa League (15)	83	37	19	27	119	108	+11	44.58
Total	121	49	31	41	154	144	+10	40.50

Source: UEFA.com
Pld = Matches played; W = Matches won; D = Matches drawn; L = Matches lost; GF = Goals for; GA = Goals against; GD = Goal difference.

== Results ==
=== Key ===
- 1R: First round
- 2R: Second round
- 3R: Third round
- QF: Quarter-final
- SF: Semi-final
- 3Q: Third qualifying round
- PO: Play-off round
- a.e.t.: After extra time
- p: Penalty shoot-out
- Round or group progressed
- Round or group eliminated

=== Matches ===
Season	Competition	Round	Opponent	Home	Away	Aggregate
1974–75	UEFA Cup	1R	(Czechoslovakia) Baník Ostrava	0–1	0–4	0–5
1975–76	UEFA Cup	1R	(Switzerland) Grasshopper	1–1	3–3	4–4
1975–76	UEFA Cup	2R	(England) Liverpool (Note: Liverpool were the eventual winners)	1–3	0–6 (Note: worst defeat (single match))	1–9 (Note: worst aggregate defeat)
1979–80	UEFA Cup	1R	(Italy) Internazionale	2–0	0–3	2–3
1980–81	UEFA Cup	1R	(Hungary) Újpest	1–0	1–1	2–1
1980–81	UEFA Cup	2R	(Czechoslovakia) Zbrojovka Brno	2–1	1–1	3–2
1980–81	UEFA Cup	3R	(Belgium) Lokeren	2–2	0–1	2–3
1981–82	European Cup	1R	(Bulgaria) CSKA Sofia	0–0	0–1	0–1
1982–83	European Cup	1R	(Iceland) Víkingur Reykjavík	3–2	1–0	4–2
1982–83	European Cup	2R	(Scotland) Celtic	2–0	1–2	3–2
1982–83	European Cup	QF	(Portugal) Sporting CP	2–0	0–1	2–1
1982–83	European Cup	SF (Note: furthest progression)	(West Germany) Hamburger SV (Note: Hamburger SV were the eventual winners)	1–1	1–2	2–3
1987–88	Cup Winner's Cup	1R	(Poland) Śląsk Wrocław	0–0	2–0	2–0
1987–88	Cup Winner's Cup	2R	(Soviet Union) Dinamo Minsk	1–1	0–0	1–1
1988–89	UEFA Cup	1R	(Czechoslovakia) Dukla Prague	2–1	2–3	4–4
1988–89	UEFA Cup	2R	(Portugal) Sporting CP	0–0	2–1	2–1
1988–89	UEFA Cup	3R	(West Germany) 1. FC Köln	1–0	2–2	3–2
1988–89	UEFA Cup	QF	(West Germany) VfB Stuttgart	1–0	0–1 (a.e.t.)	1–1 (2–4 p)
1990–91	UEFA Cup	1R	(Switzerland) Lausanne Sports	1–0	2–3	3–3
1990–91	UEFA Cup	2R	(Socialist Federal Republic of Yugoslavia) Partizan	1–0	0–1 (a.e.t.)	1–1 (3–4 p)
1992–93	UEFA Cup	1R	(Portugal) Vitória de Guimarães	2–0	0–3	2–3
1998–99	UEFA Cup	1R	(Czech Republic) Sparta Prague	1–0	4–2	5–2
1998–99	UEFA Cup	2R	(Russia) Dynamo Moscow	3–0	3–2	6–2 (Note: joint-best aggregate victory)
1998–99	UEFA Cup	3R	(Spain) Atlético Madrid	2–1	1–4	3–5
2003–04	Champions League	Group D	(Italy) Juventus	0–0	2–4	2nd
2003–04	Champions League	Group D	(Turkey) Galatasaray	1–1	2–1	2nd
2003–04	Champions League	Group D	(Greece) Olympiacos	1–0	2–2	2nd
2003–04	Champions League	Round of 16	(France) Lyon	0–1	0–1	0–2
2013–14	Champions League	PO	(France) Lyon	2–0	2–0	4–0 (Note: joint-best aggregate victory)
2013–14	Champions League	Group A	(England) Manchester United	0–0	0–1	4th
2013–14	Champions League	Group A	(Germany) Bayer Leverkusen	0–1	1–2	4th
2013–14	Champions League	Group A	(Ukraine) Shakhtar Donetsk	0–2	0–4	4th
2014–15	Europa League	3Q	(Scotland) Aberdeen	2–0	3–2	5–2
2014–15	Europa League	PO	(Russia) Krasnodar	1–0	0–3	1–3
2017–18	Europa League	Group L	(Russia) Zenit Saint Petersburg	1–3	1–3	2nd
2017–18	Europa League	Group L	(Norway) Rosenborg	4–0	1–0	2nd
2017–18	Europa League	Group L	(North Macedonia) Vardar	6–0 (Note: biggest win (single match))	3–0	2nd
2017–18	Europa League	Round of 32	(Austria) Red Bull Salzburg	2–2	1–2	3–4
2020–21	Europa League	Group F	(Italy) Napoli	0–1	1–1	2nd
2020–21	Europa League	Group F	(Netherlands) AZ	1–0	0–0	2nd
2020–21	Europa League	Group F	(Croatia) Rijeka	2–2	1–0	2nd
2020–21	Europa League	Round of 32	(England) Manchester United	0–4	0–0	0–4
2021–22	Europa League	Group B	(France) Monaco	1–1	1–2	2nd
2021–22	Europa League	Group B	(Netherlands) PSV Eindhoven	3–0	2–2	2nd
2021–22	Europa League	Group B	(Austria) Sturm Graz	1–1	1–0	2nd
2021–22	Europa League	Knockout play-offs	(Germany) RB Leipzig	1–3	2–2	3–5
2022–23	Europa League	Group E	(England) Manchester United	0–1	1–0	1st
2022–23	Europa League	Group E	(Cyprus) Omonia	2–1	2–0	1st
2022–23	Europa League	Group E	(Moldova) Sheriff Tiraspol	3–0	2–0	1st
2022–23	Europa League	Round of 16	(Italy) Roma	0–0	0–2	0–2
2023–24	Champions League	Group D	(Italy) Internazionale	1–1	0–0	1st
2023–24	Champions League	Group D	(Austria) Red Bull Salzburg	0–0	2–0	1st
2023–24	Champions League	Group D	(Portugal) Benfica	3–1	1–0	1st
2023–24	Champions League	Round of 16	(France) Paris Saint-Germain	1–2	0–2	1–4
2024–25	Europa League	League phase	(France) Nice	—N/a	1–1	13th
2024–25	Europa League	League phase	(Belgium) Anderlecht	1–2	—N/a	13th
2024–25	Europa League	League phase	(Israel) Maccabi Tel Aviv	—N/a	2–1	13th
2024–25	Europa League	League phase	(Czech Republic) Viktoria Plzeň	—N/a	1–2	13th
2024–25	Europa League	League phase	(Netherlands) Ajax	2–0	—N/a	13th
2024–25	Europa League	League phase	(Ukraine) Dynamo Kyiv	3–0	—N/a	13th
2024–25	Europa League	League phase	(Italy) Lazio	—N/a	1–3	13th
2024–25	Europa League	League phase	(Greece) PAOK	2–0	—N/a	13th
2024–25	Europa League	Knockout play-offs	(Denmark) Midtjylland	5–2	2–1	7–3
2024–25	Europa League	Round of 16	(England) Manchester United	1–1	1–4	2–5
2026–27	Europa League	League phase	(England) Bournemouth	1–2	—N/a	
2026–27	Europa League	League phase	(Belgium) Union Saint-Gilloise	—N/a	1–1	
2026–27	Europa League	League phase	(Norway) Lillestrøm	—N/a	6-0	
2026–27	Europa League	League phase	(France) Lyon		—N/a	
2026–27	Europa League	League phase	(England) Crystal Palace	—N/a		
2026–27	Europa League	League phase	(Portugal) Torreense		—N/a	
2026–27	Europa League	League phase	(Czech Republic) Viktoria Plzeň		—N/a	
2026–27	Europa League	League phase	(Italy) Juventus	—N/a		
