= 2004 UEFA Champions League final =

Association football match

- Match programme cover
- Event: 2003–04 UEFA Champions League
Monaco	Porto
(France)	(Portugal)
0	3
- Date: 26 May 2004
- Venue: Arena AufSchalke, Gelsenkirchen
- Man of the Match: Deco (Porto)
- Referee: Kim Milton Nielsen (Denmark)
- Attendance: 53,053

The 2004 UEFA Champions League final was an association football match played on 26 May 2004 to decide the winner of the 2003–04 UEFA Champions League. AS Monaco, a Monaco-based club representing the French Football Federation, faced Portuguese side Porto at the Arena AufSchalke in Gelsenkirchen, Germany. Porto won the match 3–0, with Carlos Alberto, Deco and Dmitri Alenichev scoring the goals in a dominant game from Jose Mourinho's Porto. Deco was named Man of the Match.

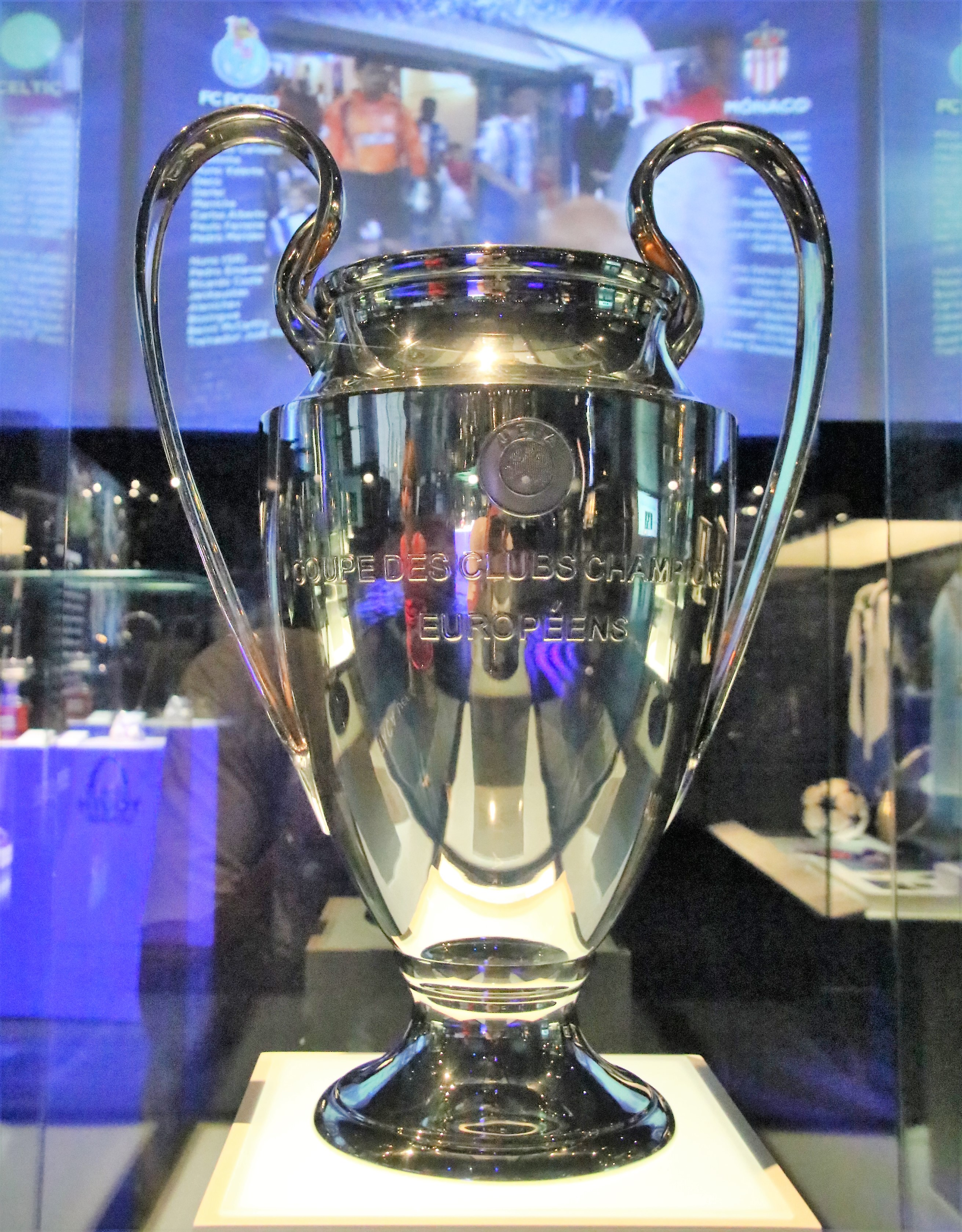
The UEFA Champions League trophy is on display at the FC Porto Museum in Estádio do Dragão.

Porto's previous triumph in the competition had been in 1987 – although they had won the UEFA Cup in the previous season – while Monaco were playing in their first ever UEFA Champions League final. Both teams started their campaigns in the group stage and defeated former European champions on their way to the final: Porto beat 1968 and 1999 winners Manchester United while Monaco defeated nine-time champions Real Madrid.

Both teams were considered underdogs in the competition before reaching the final stages and were led by young managers. Monaco had hired former France national football team captain Didier Deschamps as manager and Porto were led by rising star José Mourinho, who left the club for Chelsea a week after the match.

Monaco became the fourth club representing the French league to reach the final after Reims in 1956 & 1959, Saint-Étienne in 1976, and Olympique de Marseille in 1991 & 1993. This was the fifth final in the history of the European Cup in which neither of the teams came from England, Germany, Italy or Spain and the first since the 1991 final when Red Star Belgrade of Yugoslavia beat Marseille. To date, this is the last Champions League final to feature a team from outside the Big Five European leagues (England, France, Germany, Italy, Spain), and the last one to be won by a team from outside those five leagues.

== Background ==
=== Monaco ===
Monaco finished second in the French Ligue 1 the previous season, meaning that they entered the Champions League at the group stage. Monaco were placed in Group C, alongside Deportivo La Coruña, PSV Eindhoven and AEK Athens. After a 2–1 in their first win in the Netherlands and a 4–0 win at the Stade Louis II against AEK Athens, Monaco travelled to Spain, losing 1–0 by Deportivo. The Monegasque adventure really began after the return match against Deportivo, when Monaco won 8–3, which represented the highest number of goals in one match in the history of the new version of the UEFA Champions League; this record lasted until 22 November 2016, when Legia Warsaw lost 8–4 to Borussia Dortmund. Croatian striker Dado Pršo scored four times, while captain Ludovic Giuly (2), Jérôme Rothen, Jaroslav Plašil and Édouard Cissé pulverised the Spanish defensive line. After two more draws against PSV and AEK Athens, Monaco finished at the top of Group C.

The first knockout round saw Monaco winning against Lokomotiv Moscow after a 2–1 defeat in Russia and a win 1–0 at Stade Louis II. In the quarter-finals, Monaco played Real Madrid. After a 4–2 loss in Madrid (where Fernando Morientes scored, and was applauded by his former fans), Monaco created a sensation by defeating the Spanish 3–1 at home. Monaco played against Chelsea in the semi-finals, and despite the exclusion of Akis Zikos, Monaco found enough strength to score twice and win the game 3–1. The last goal was scored by striker Shabani Nonda, who just returned from a seven-month injury. The second leg at Stamford Bridge saw Monaco resisting Chelsea's strikes, for a final score of 2–2 to reach the European Cup final for the first time in their history.

=== Porto ===
Porto, winners of the Primeira Liga, Taça de Portugal and UEFA Cup in 2002–03, were the only Portuguese team in the group stage, after the elimination of Benfica in the third qualifying round by Italian side Lazio. Porto was drawn in Group F, along with Real Madrid, Marseille and Partizan. Porto's first match was at Partizan Stadium in Belgrade. Costinha scored the opening goal on 22 minutes, but Andrija Delibašić scored the equaliser on 54 minutes. The next match, the first at the Estádio das Antas, was a 3–1 loss to Real Madrid. Costinha scored the opening goal again, on seven minutes. Iván Helguera equalised on 28 minutes; Santiago Solari on 37 minutes and Zinedine Zidane on 67 scored Real Madrid's winning goals.

Two straight wins against Marseille followed by a win at home against Partizan secured Porto's place in the first knockout round before the last match of the group stage, a draw in Madrid. In the first knockout round, Porto met Manchester United. The Portuguese won 2–1 at home and managed to qualify in the final minutes of the second leg, when Costinha scored an equaliser in injury time in a 1–1 draw at Old Trafford. In the quarter-finals, Porto met a French team for the second time in the tournament: a 2–0 win at home and a 2–2 draw in France eliminated Lyon from the competition. In the semi-finals, Porto played Deportivo La Coruña, eliminating them 1–0 on aggregate.

== Route to the final ==
(France) Monaco				Round	(Portugal) Porto			
Opponent	Result			Group stage	Opponent	Result		
(Netherlands) PSV Eindhoven	2–1 (A)			Matchday 1	(Serbia and Montenegro) Partizan	1–1 (A)		
(Greece) AEK Athens	4–0 (H)			Matchday 2	(Spain) Real Madrid	1–3 (H)		
(Spain) Deportivo La Coruña	0–1 (A)			Matchday 3	(France) Marseille	2–3 (A)		
(Spain) Deportivo La Coruña	8–3 (H)			Matchday 4	(France) Marseille	1–0 (H)		
(Netherlands) PSV Eindhoven	1–1 (H)			Matchday 5	(Serbia and Montenegro) Partizan	2–1 (H)		
(Greece) AEK Athens	0–0 (A)			Matchday 6	(Spain) Real Madrid	1–1 (A)		
Group C winners: Pos / Team / Pld / Pts; 1 / (France) Monaco / 6 / 11; 2 / (Spain) Deportivo La Coruña / 6 / 10; 3 / (Netherlands) PSV Eindhoven / 6 / 10; 4 / (Greece) AEK Athens / 6 / 2; Source: RSSSF				Final standings	Group F runners-up: Pos / Team / Pld / Pts; 1 / (Spain) Real Madrid / 6 / 14; 2 / (Portugal) Porto / 6 / 11; 3 / (France) Marseille / 6 / 4; 4 / (Serbia and Montenegro) Partizan / 6 / 3; Source: RSSSF			
Opponent	Agg.	1st leg	2nd leg	Knockout stage	Opponent	Agg.	1st leg	2nd leg
(Russia) Lokomotiv Moscow	2–2 (a)	1–2 (A)	1–0 (H)	First knockout round	(England) Manchester United	3–2	2–1 (H)	1–1 (A)
(Spain) Real Madrid	5–5 (a)	2–4 (A)	3–1 (H)	Quarter-finals	(France) Lyon	4–2	2–0 (H)	2–2 (A)
(England) Chelsea	5–3	3–1 (H)	2–2 (A)	Semi-finals	(Spain) Deportivo La Coruña	1–0	0–0 (H)	1–0 (A)

== Match ==
=== Summary ===
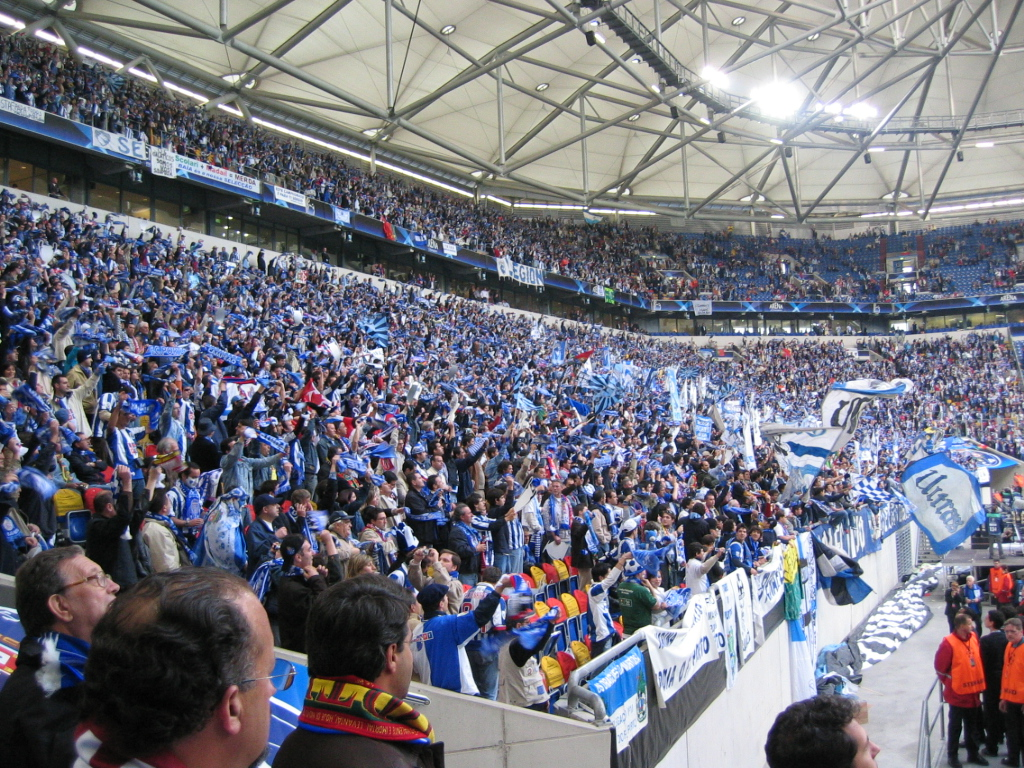
FC Porto supporters at the Gelsenkirchen Arena AufSchalke.

Monaco, in their first European final since the 1992 Europa Cup, were up against Porto, the UEFA Cup winners from the previous season, who were appearing in the European Cup final for a second time, after defeating Bayern Munich in the 1987 European Cup final. Porto were the favourites after eliminating Manchester United and Deportivo La Coruña in the knockout phase, while Monaco had eliminated Real Madrid and Chelsea. Porto won the match 3–0; Carlos Alberto opened the scoring in the first half, while Deco and Dmitri Alenichev extended Porto's lead in the second half.

=== Details ===
26 May 2004
20:45 UTC+2

Monaco (France)	0–3	(Portugal) Porto
	Report	Carlos Alberto 39'; Deco 71'; Alenichev 75'

Arena AufSchalke, Gelsenkirchen
Attendance: 53,053
Referee: Kim Milton Nielsen (Denmark)

Monaco	Porto

GK	30	(Italy) Flavio Roma
RB	4	(Argentina) Hugo Ibarra
CB	27	(France) Julien Rodriguez
CB	32	(France) Gaël Givet	(substituted off) 72'
LB	3	(France) Patrice Evra
CM	14	(France) Édouard Cissé	(substituted off) 64'
CM	7	(Argentina) Lucas Bernardi
CM	15	(Greece) Akis Zikos
RW	8	(France) Ludovic Giuly (c)	(substituted off) 23'
LW	25	(France) Jérôme Rothen
CF	10	(Spain) Fernando Morientes
Substitutes:
GK	29	(Senegal) Tony Sylva
DF	19	(France) Sébastien Squillaci	(substituted on) 72'
MF	6	(Czech Republic) Jaroslav Plašil
MF	35	(Norway) Hassan El Fakiri
FW	9	(Croatia) Dado Pršo	(substituted on) 23'
FW	18	(Democratic Republic of the Congo) Shabani Nonda	(substituted on) 64'
FW	24	(Togo) Emmanuel Adebayor
Manager:
(France) Didier Deschamps

GK	99	(Portugal) Vítor Baía
RB	22	(Portugal) Paulo Ferreira
CB	2	(Portugal) Jorge Costa (c)	(yellow card) 77'
CB	4	(Portugal) Ricardo Carvalho
LB	8	(Portugal) Nuno Valente	(yellow card) 29'
DM	6	(Portugal) Costinha
CM	23	(Portugal) Pedro Mendes
CM	18	(Portugal) Maniche
AM	10	(Portugal) Deco		(substituted off) 85'
CF	19	(Brazil) Carlos Alberto	(yellow card) 40'	(substituted off) 60'
CF	11	(Brazil) Derlei		(substituted off) 78'
Substitutes:
GK	13	(Portugal) Nuno Espírito Santo
DF	3	(Portugal) Pedro Emanuel		(substituted on) 85'
DF	5	(Portugal) Ricardo Costa
DF	17	(Portugal) José Bosingwa
MF	15	(Russia) Dmitri Alenichev		(substituted on) 60'
FW	9	(Lithuania) Edgaras Jankauskas
FW	77	(South Africa) Benni McCarthy		(substituted on) 78'
Manager:
(Portugal) José Mourinho

Man of the Match:
Deco (Porto)

Assistant referees:
Jens Larsen (Denmark)
Jørgen Jepsen (Denmark)
Fourth official:
Knud Erik Fisker (Denmark)

Match rules

- 90 minutes
- 30 minutes of silver goal extra time if necessary
- Penalty shoot-out if scores still level
- Seven named substitutes
- Maximum of three substitutions

=== Statistics ===
First half
Statistic	Monaco	Porto
Goals scored	0	1
Total shots	1	2
Shots on target	0	1
Ball possession	54%	46%
Corner kicks	1	2
Fouls committed	7	6
Offsides	7	3
Yellow cards	0	2
Red cards	0	0

Second half
Statistic	Monaco	Porto
Goals scored	0	2
Total shots	6	2
Shots on target	0	2
Ball possession	58%	42%
Corner kicks	5	0
Fouls committed	3	8
Offsides	5	5
Yellow cards	0	1
Red cards	0	0

Overall
Statistic	Monaco	Porto
Goals scored	0	3
Total shots	7	4
Shots on target	0	3
Ball possession	56%	44%
Corner kicks	6	2
Fouls committed	10	14
Offsides	12	8
Yellow cards	0	3
Red cards	0	0

== See also ==
- 2003–04 AS Monaco FC season
- 2003–04 FC Porto season
- 2004 UEFA Cup final
- 2004 UEFA Women's Cup final
- 2004 UEFA Super Cup
- 2004 Intercontinental Cup
- AS Monaco FC in European football
- FC Porto in international football
