= 2003–04 UEFA Champions League group stage =

International football competition

The 2003–04 UEFA Champions League group stage matches took take place between 16 September and 10 December 2003. The group stage featured teams qualified by their league positions and others who had come through qualifying.

== Teams ==
The 32 teams were divided into four pots. Pot 1 comprised the previous year's title holders Milan and the top seven clubs in the team ranking. Pot 2 contained the following eight clubs in the rankings and likewise for Pots 3 and 4. Each group contained one team from each pot. A team's seeding was determined by the UEFA coefficients.

Clubs from the same association were paired up to split the matchdays between Tuesday and Wednesday. Clubs with the same pairing letter would play on different days, ensuring that teams from the same city (e.g. Milan and Internazionale, who also share a stadium) did not play on the same day.

Group winners and runners-up advanced to the first knockout round
Third-placed teams entered the UEFA Cup at the third knockout round

Pot 1
Team	Notes	Coeff.
(Italy) Milan		97.155
(Spain) Real Madrid		151.769
(England) Manchester United		136.170
(Germany) Bayern Munich		124.566
(Italy) Lazio		106.155
(England) Arsenal		105.170
(Italy) Juventus		100.155
(Spain) Deportivo La Coruña		98.769

Pot 2
Team	Notes	Coeff.
(Italy) Internazionale		93.155
(Portugal) Porto		86.791
(Spain) Celta Vigo		86.769
(Turkey) Galatasaray		78.495
(France) Lyon		76.734
(Greece) Panathinaikos		72.391
(England) Chelsea		70.170
(Netherlands) PSV Eindhoven		60.749

Pot 3
Team	Notes	Coeff.
(Scotland) Celtic		57.187
(Greece) AEK Athens		56.391
(Ukraine) Dynamo Kyiv		55.291
(Netherlands) Ajax		54.749
(Greece) Olympiacos		54.391
(Scotland) Rangers		50.187
(Czech Republic) Sparta Prague		49.975
(France) Marseille		49.734

Pot 4
Team	Notes	Coeff.
(Germany) VfB Stuttgart		49.566
(Russia) Lokomotiv Moscow		49.520
(Belgium) Anderlecht		49.250
(Spain) Real Sociedad		47.769
(France) Monaco		45.734
(Belgium) Club Brugge		44.250
(Turkey) Beşiktaş		33.495
(Serbia and Montenegro) Partizan		20.915

Notes

1. ^{TH} Champions League title holders (automatic top seed of pot 1)
2. ^{Q3} Winners of the third qualifying round

== Format ==
During the group stage, each team plays the other three teams in their group twice (home and away or at an alternative venue). The top two teams with the most points or who meet the tie-break criteria progress to the first knockout round. The third placed side entered the UEFA Cup in 2004.

=== Tiebreakers ===
Based on paragraph 4.05 in the UEFA regulations for the current season, if two or more teams are equal on points on completion of the group matches, the following criteria are applied to determine the rankings:

1. higher number of points obtained in the group matches played among the teams in question;
2. superior goal difference from the group matches played among the teams in question;
3. higher number of goals scored away from home in the group matches played among the teams in question;
4. superior goal difference from all group matches played;
5. higher number of goals scored in all group matches played;
6. higher number of coefficient points accumulated by the club in question, as well as its association, over the previous five seasons.

== Groups ==
Times are CET/CEST, (Note: CET (UTC+1) for matches from 4 November 2003, and CEST (UTC+2) for matches to 22 October 2003.) as listed by UEFA (local times, if different, are in parentheses).

=== Group A ===
Pos	Team	Pld	W	D	L	GF	GA	GD	Pts	Qualification	LYO	BAY	CEL	AND
1	(France) Lyon	6	3	1	2	7	7	0	10	Advance to knockout stage	—	1–1	3–2	1–0
2	(Germany) Bayern Munich	6	2	3	1	6	5	+1	9	Advance to knockout stage	1–2	—	2–1	1–0
3	(Scotland) Celtic	6	2	1	3	8	7	+1	7	Transfer to UEFA Cup	2–0	0–0	—	3–1
4	(Belgium) Anderlecht	6	2	1	3	4	6	−2	7		1–0	1–1	1–0	—

Source: RSSSF
17 September 2003
20:45

Lyon (France)	1–0	(Belgium) Anderlecht
Juninho 25' (pen.)	Report

Stade de Gerland, Lyon
Attendance: 37,002
Referee: Paulo Costa (Portugal)
17 September 2003
20:45

Bayern Munich (Germany)	2–1	(Scotland) Celtic
Makaay 73', 86'	Report	Thompson 56'

Olympic Stadium, Munich
Attendance: 48,000
Referee: Massimo De Santis (Italy)

30 September 2003
20:45 (19:45 UTC+1)

Celtic (Scotland)	2–0	(France) Lyon
Miller 70'; Sutton 78'	Report

Celtic Park, Glasgow
Attendance: 59,407
Referee: Eduardo Iturralde González (Spain)
30 September 2003
20:45

Anderlecht (Belgium)	1–1	(Germany) Bayern Munich
Mornar 52'	Report	Santa Cruz 73'

Constant Vanden Stock Stadium, Brussels
Attendance: 21,788
Referee: Luis Medina Cantalejo (Spain)

21 October 2003
20:45

Anderlecht (Belgium)	1–0	(Scotland) Celtic
Dindane 72'	Report

Constant Vanden Stock Stadium, Brussels
Attendance: 21,835
Referee: Fritz Stuchlik (Austria)
21 October 2003
20:45

Lyon (France)	1–1	(Germany) Bayern Munich
Luyindula 88'	Report	Makaay 25'

Stade de Gerland, Lyon
Attendance: 37,659
Referee: Ľuboš Micheľ (Slovakia)

5 November 2003
20:45 (19:45 UTC+0)

Celtic (Scotland)	3–1	(Belgium) Anderlecht
Larsson 12'; Miller 17'; Sutton 29'	Report	Dindane 77'

Celtic Park, Glasgow
Attendance: 59,201
Referee: Kyros Vassaras (Greece)
5 November 2003
20:45

Bayern Munich (Germany)	1–2	(France) Lyon
Makaay 14'	Report	Juninho 6'; Élber 53'

Olympic Stadium, Munich
Attendance: 59,000
Referee: Graham Barber (England)

25 November 2003
20:45

Anderlecht (Belgium)	1–0	(France) Lyon
Tihinen 69'	Report

Constant Vanden Stock Stadium, Brussels
Attendance: 20,779
Referee: Domenico Messina (Italy)
25 November 2003
20:45 (19:45 UTC+0)

Celtic (Scotland)	0–0	(Germany) Bayern Munich
	Report

Celtic Park, Glasgow
Attendance: 59,540
Referee: René Temmink (Netherlands)

10 December 2003
20:45

Lyon (France)	3–2	(Scotland) Celtic
Élber 6'; Juninho 52', 86' (pen.)	Report	Hartson 24'; Sutton 75'

Stade de Gerland, Lyon
Attendance: 38,659
Referee: Urs Meier (Switzerland)
10 December 2003
20:45

Bayern Munich (Germany)	1–0	(Belgium) Anderlecht
Makaay 42' (pen.)	Report

Olympic Stadium, Munich
Attendance: 52,000
Referee: Kim Milton Nielsen (Denmark)

=== Group B ===
Pos	Team	Pld	W	D	L	GF	GA	GD	Pts	Qualification	ARS	LMO	INT	DKV
1	(England) Arsenal	6	3	1	2	9	6	+3	10	Advance to knockout stage	—	2–0	0–3	1–0
2	(Russia) Lokomotiv Moscow	6	2	2	2	7	7	0	8	Advance to knockout stage	0–0	—	3–0	3–2
3	(Italy) Internazionale	6	2	2	2	8	11	−3	8	Transfer to UEFA Cup	1–5	1–1	—	2–1
4	(Ukraine) Dynamo Kyiv	6	2	1	3	8	8	0	7		2–1	2–0	1–1	—

17 September 2003
20:45 (21:45 UTC+3)

Dynamo Kyiv (Ukraine)	2–0	(Russia) Lokomotiv Moscow
Rincón 83', 90'	Report

Olimpiyskiy NSC, Kyiv
Attendance: 72,500
Referee: Peter Fröjdfeldt (Sweden)
17 September 2003
20:45 (19:45 UTC+1)

Arsenal (England)	0–3	(Italy) Internazionale
	Report	Cruz 21'; Van der Meyde 24'; Martins 41'

Highbury, London
Attendance: 34,393
Referee: Manuel Mejuto González (Spain)

30 September 2003
18:30 (20:30 UTC+4)

Lokomotiv Moscow (Russia)	0–0	(England) Arsenal
	Report

Lokomotiv Stadium, Moscow
Attendance: 24,000
Referee: Jan Wegereef (Netherlands)
30 September 2003
20:45

Internazionale (Italy)	2–1	(Ukraine) Dynamo Kyiv
Adani 23'; Vieri 90'	Report	Fedorov 34'

San Siro, Milan
Attendance: 70,882
Referee: Stéphane Bré (France)

21 October 2003
18:30 (20:30 UTC+4)

Lokomotiv Moscow (Russia)	3–0	(Italy) Internazionale
Loskov 2'; Ashvetia 50'; Khokhlov 57'	Report

Lokomotiv Stadium, Moscow
Attendance: 23,000
Referee: Franz-Xaver Wack (Germany)
21 October 2003
20:45 (21:45 UTC+3)

Dynamo Kyiv (Ukraine)	2–1	(England) Arsenal
Shatskikh 27'; Belkevich 64'	Report	Henry 80'

Olimpiyskiy NSC, Kyiv
Attendance: 82,750
Referee: Konrad Plautz (Austria)

5 November 2003
20:45

Internazionale (Italy)	1–1	(Russia) Lokomotiv Moscow
Recoba 14'	Report	Loskov 54'

San Siro, Milan
Attendance: 22,828
Referee: Frank De Bleeckere (Belgium)
5 November 2003
20:45 (19:45 UTC+0)

Arsenal (England)	1–0	(Ukraine) Dynamo Kyiv
Cole 88'	Report

Highbury, London
Attendance: 34,419
Referee: Lucílio Batista (Portugal)

25 November 2003
18:30 (20:30 UTC+3)

Lokomotiv Moscow (Russia)	3–2	(Ukraine) Dynamo Kyiv
Buznikin 28'; Ignashevitch 45' (pen.); Parks 89'	Report	Belkevich 37'; Shatskikh 65'

Lokomotiv Stadium, Moscow
Attendance: 18,000
Referee: Arturo Daudén Ibáñez (Spain)
25 November 2003
20:45

Internazionale (Italy)	1–5	(England) Arsenal
Vieri 32'	Report	Henry 25', 85'; Ljungberg 49'; Edu 87'; Pires 89'

San Siro, Milan
Attendance: 44,884
Referee: Wolfgang Stark (Germany)

10 December 2003
20:45 (21:45 UTC+2)

Dynamo Kyiv (Ukraine)	1–1	(Italy) Internazionale
Rincón 85'	Report	Adani 68'

Olimpiyskiy NSC, Kyiv
Attendance: 81,500
Referee: Gilles Veissière (France)
10 December 2003
20:45 (19:45 UTC+0)

Arsenal (England)	2–0	(Russia) Lokomotiv Moscow
Pires 12'; Ljungberg 67'	Report

Highbury, London
Attendance: 35,343
Referee: Ľuboš Micheľ (Slovakia)

=== Group C ===
Pos	Team	Pld	W	D	L	GF	GA	GD	Pts	Qualification	MON	DEP	PSV	AEK
1	(France) Monaco	6	3	2	1	15	6	+9	11	Advance to knockout stage	—	8–3	1–1	4–0
2	(Spain) Deportivo La Coruña	6	3	1	2	12	12	0	10	Advance to knockout stage	1–0	—	2–0	3–0
3	(Netherlands) PSV Eindhoven	6	3	1	2	8	7	+1	10	Transfer to UEFA Cup	1–2	3–2	—	2–0
4	(Greece) AEK Athens	6	0	2	4	1	11	−10	2		0–0	1–1	0–1	—

Source: RSSSF
17 September 2003
20:45 (21:45 UTC+3)

AEK Athens (Greece)	1–1	(Spain) Deportivo La Coruña
Tsiartas 86'	Report	Pandiani 12'

Leoforos Alexandras Stadium, Athens
Attendance: 13,583
Referee: Mike McCurry (Scotland)
17 September 2003
20:45

PSV Eindhoven (Netherlands)	1–2	(France) Monaco
Bouma 65'	Report	Morientes 31'; Cissé 56'

Philips Stadion, Eindhoven
Attendance: 24,500
Referee: Steve Bennett (England)

30 September 2003
20:45

Monaco (France)	4–0	(Greece) AEK Athens
Giuly 23'; Morientes 25', 56'; Pršo 86'	Report

Stade Louis II, Monaco
Attendance: 11,790
Referee: Stefano Farina (Italy)
30 September 2003
20:45

Deportivo La Coruña (Spain)	2–0	(Netherlands) PSV Eindhoven
Sergio 20'; Pandiani 51' (pen.)	Report

Estadio Riazor, A Coruña
Attendance: 18,973
Referee: Claus Bo Larsen (Denmark)

21 October 2003
20:45

Deportivo La Coruña (Spain)	1–0	(France) Monaco
Tristán 83'	Report

Estadio Riazor, A Coruña
Attendance: 21,507
Referee: Frank De Bleeckere (Belgium)
21 October 2003
20:45 (21:45 UTC+3)

AEK Athens (Greece)	0–1	(Netherlands) PSV Eindhoven
	Report	Lucius 37'

Leoforos Alexandras Stadium, Athens
Attendance: 7,290
Referee: Leslie Irvine (Northern Ireland)

5 November 2003
20:45

Monaco (France)	8–3	(Spain) Deportivo La Coruña
Rothen 2'; Giuly 11'; Pršo 26', 30', 45+2', 49'; Plašil 47'; Cissé 67'	Report	Tristán 39', 52'; Scaloni 45'

Stade Louis II, Monaco
Attendance: 15,882
Referee: Terje Hauge (Norway)
5 November 2003
20:45

PSV Eindhoven (Netherlands)	2–0	(Greece) AEK Athens
Bouma 51'; Robben 63'	Report

Philips Stadion, Eindhoven
Attendance: 28,000
Referee: Konrad Plautz (Austria)

25 November 2003
20:45

Deportivo La Coruña (Spain)	3–0	(Greece) AEK Athens
Héctor 22'; Valerón 51'; Luque 71'	Report

Estadio Riazor, A Coruña
Attendance: 17,205
Referee: Mike Riley (England)
25 November 2003
20:45

Monaco (France)	1–1	(Netherlands) PSV Eindhoven
Morientes 34'	Report	Vennegoor of Hesselink 84'

Stade Louis II, Monaco
Attendance: 14,587
Referee: Željko Širić (Croatia)

10 December 2003
20:45 (21:45 UTC+2)

AEK Athens (Greece)	0–0	(France) Monaco
	Report

Leoforos Alexandras Stadium, Athens
Attendance: 1,205
Referee: Wolfgang Stark (Germany)
10 December 2003
20:45

PSV Eindhoven (Netherlands)	3–2	(Spain) Deportivo La Coruña
De Jong 14', 90+4'; Robben 48'	Report	Luque 59'; Pandiani 83'

Philips Stadion, Eindhoven
Attendance: 30,000
Referee: Pierluigi Collina (Italy)

=== Group D ===
Pos	Team	Pld	W	D	L	GF	GA	GD	Pts	Qualification	JUV	RSO	GAL	OLY
1	(Italy) Juventus	6	4	1	1	15	6	+9	13	Advance to knockout stage	—	4–2	2–1	7–0
2	(Spain) Real Sociedad	6	2	3	1	8	8	0	9	Advance to knockout stage	0–0	—	1–1	1–0
3	(Turkey) Galatasaray	6	2	1	3	6	8	−2	7	Transfer to UEFA Cup	2–0	1–2	—	1–0
4	(Greece) Olympiacos	6	1	1	4	6	13	−7	4		1–2	2–2	3–0	—

Source: RSSSF
17 September 2003
20:45

Juventus (Italy)	2–1	(Turkey) Galatasaray
Del Piero 5', 73'	Report	Şükür 19'

Stadio delle Alpi, Turin
Attendance: 14,420
Referee: Valentin Ivanov (Russia)
17 September 2003
20:45

Real Sociedad (Spain)	1–0	(Greece) Olympiacos
Kovačević 80' (pen.)	Report

Anoeta Stadium, San Sebastián
Attendance: 29,091
Referee: Knud Erik Fisker (Denmark)

30 September 2003
20:45 (21:45 UTC+3)

Olympiacos (Greece)	1–2	(Italy) Juventus
Stoltidis 11'	Report	Nedvěd 21', 79'

Georgios Kamaras Stadium, Athens
Attendance: 12,921
Referee: Éric Poulat (France)
30 September 2003
20:45 (21:45 UTC+3)

Galatasaray (Turkey)	1–2	(Spain) Real Sociedad
Şükür 61'	Report	Kovačević 3'; Alonso 72'

Atatürk Olympic Stadium, Istanbul
Attendance: 58,617
Referee: Herbert Fandel (Germany)

21 October 2003
20:45 (21:45 UTC+3)

Galatasaray (Turkey)	1–0	(Greece) Olympiacos
Cihan 9'	Report

Atatürk Olympic Stadium, Istanbul
Attendance: 41,125
Referee: Urs Meier (Switzerland)
21 October 2003
20:45

Juventus (Italy)	4–2	(Spain) Real Sociedad
Trezeguet 3', 63'; Di Vaio 7', 45+1'	Report	Tudor 67' (o.g.); De Pedro 80'

Stadio delle Alpi, Turin
Attendance: 17,426
Referee: Graham Poll (England)

5 November 2003
20:45 (21:45 UTC+2)

Olympiacos (Greece)	3–0	(Turkey) Galatasaray
Mavrogenidis 6'; Castillo 34'; Giovanni 90+6'	Report

Georgios Kamaras Stadium, Athens
Attendance: 12,145
Referee: Ľuboš Micheľ (Slovakia)
5 November 2003
20:45

Real Sociedad (Spain)	0–0	(Italy) Juventus
	Report

Anoeta Stadium, San Sebastián
Attendance: 29,500
Referee: Stéphane Bré (France)

25 November 2003
20:45 (21:45 UTC+2)

Olympiacos (Greece)	2–2	(Spain) Real Sociedad
Stoltidis 59'; Castillo 71'	Report	Gabilondo 31'; Schürrer 74'

Georgios Kamaras Stadium, Athens
Attendance: 12,050
Referee: Alain Hamer (Luxembourg)
2 December 2003 (Note: The Galatasaray v Juventus match, originally scheduled to be played on 25 November 2003 at Atatürk Olympic Stadium, Istanbul, was postponed to 2 December 2003 and relocated to Westfalenstadion, Dortmund, Germany, for security reasons due to the 2003 Istanbul bombings.)
20:45

Galatasaray (Turkey)	2–0	(Italy) Juventus
Şükür 47', 90+4'	Report

Westfalenstadion, Dortmund, Germany
Attendance: 44,045
Referee: Kim Milton Nielsen (Denmark)

10 December 2003
20:45

Juventus (Italy)	7–0	(Greece) Olympiacos
Trezeguet 14', 25'; Miccoli 19'; Maresca 28'; Di Vaio 62'; Del Piero 67'; Zalayeta 79'	Report

Stadio delle Alpi, Turin
Attendance: 12,578
Referee: Konrad Plautz (Austria)
10 December 2003
20:45

Real Sociedad (Spain)	1–1	(Turkey) Galatasaray
De Paula 51'	Report	Şükür 26'

Anoeta Stadium, San Sebastián
Attendance: 27,276
Referee: Terje Hauge (Norway)

=== Group E ===
Pos	Team	Pld	W	D	L	GF	GA	GD	Pts	Qualification	MUN	STU	PAN	RAN
1	(England) Manchester United	6	5	0	1	13	2	+11	15	Advance to knockout stage	—	2–0	5–0	3–0
2	(Germany) VfB Stuttgart	6	4	0	2	9	6	+3	12	Advance to knockout stage	2–1	—	2–0	1–0
3	(Greece) Panathinaikos	6	1	1	4	5	13	−8	4	Transfer to UEFA Cup	0–1	1–3	—	1–1
4	(Scotland) Rangers	6	1	1	4	4	10	−6	4		0–1	2–1	1–3	—

Source: RSSSF
16 September 2003
20:45 (19:45 UTC+1)

Rangers (Scotland)	2–1	(Germany) VfB Stuttgart
Nerlinger 74'; Løvenkrands 78'	Report	Kurányi 45'

Ibrox Stadium, Glasgow
Attendance: 47,957
Referee: Gilles Veissière (France)
16 September 2003
20:45 (19:45 UTC+1)

Manchester United (England)	5–0	(Greece) Panathinaikos
Silvestre 13'; Fortune 14'; Solskjær 33'; Butt 40'; Djemba-Djemba 83'	Report

Old Trafford, Manchester
Attendance: 66,525
Referee: Alain Sars (France)

1 October 2003
20:45 (21:45 UTC+3)

Panathinaikos (Greece)	1–1	(Scotland) Rangers
Konstantinidis 88'	Report	Emerson 35'

Leoforos Alexandras Stadium, Athens
Attendance: 13,718
Referee: Arturo Daudén Ibáñez (Spain)
1 October 2003
20:45

VfB Stuttgart (Germany)	2–1	(England) Manchester United
Szabics 51'; Kurányi 52'	Report	Van Nistelrooy 67' (pen.)

Gottlieb-Daimler-Stadion, Stuttgart
Attendance: 48,648
Referee: Cosimo Bolognino (Italy)

22 October 2003
20:45

VfB Stuttgart (Germany)	2–0	(Greece) Panathinaikos
Szabics 13'; Soldo 25'	Report

Gottlieb-Daimler-Stadion, Stuttgart
Attendance: 48,348
Referee: Paul Allaerts (Belgium)
22 October 2003
20:45 (19:45 UTC+1)

Rangers (Scotland)	0–1	(England) Manchester United
	Report	P. Neville 31'

Ibrox Stadium, Glasgow
Attendance: 48,725
Referee: Anders Frisk (Sweden)

4 November 2003
20:45 (21:45 UTC+2)

Panathinaikos (Greece)	1–3	(Germany) VfB Stuttgart
Konstantinou 60'	Report	Fyssas 68' (o.g.); Kurányi 75'; Hinkel 77'

Leoforos Alexandras Stadium, Athens
Attendance: 6,018
Referee: Massimo De Santis (Italy)
4 November 2003
20:45 (19:45 UTC+0)

Manchester United (England)	3–0	(Scotland) Rangers
Forlán 6'; Van Nistelrooy 43', 60'	Report

Old Trafford, Manchester
Attendance: 66,707
Referee: Pierluigi Collina (Italy)

26 November 2003
20:45

VfB Stuttgart (Germany)	1–0	(Scotland) Rangers
Wenzel 45'	Report

Gottlieb-Daimler-Stadion, Stuttgart
Attendance: 46,160
Referee: Manuel Mejuto González (Spain)
26 November 2003
20:45 (21:45 UTC+2)

Panathinaikos (Greece)	0–1	(England) Manchester United
	Report	Forlán 85'

Leoforos Alexandras Stadium, Athens
Attendance: 6,890
Referee: Jan Wegereef (Netherlands)

9 December 2003
20:45 (19:45 UTC+0)

Rangers (Scotland)	1–3	(Greece) Panathinaikos
Mols 28'	Report	Žutautas 32'; Basinas 62'; Konstantinou 80'

Ibrox Stadium, Glasgow
Attendance: 48,588
Referee: Herbert Fandel (Germany)
9 December 2003
20:45 (19:45 UTC+0)

Manchester United (England)	2–0	(Germany) VfB Stuttgart
Van Nistelrooy 45'; Giggs 58'	Report

Old Trafford, Manchester
Attendance: 67,141
Referee: Éric Poulat (France)

=== Group F ===
Pos	Team	Pld	W	D	L	GF	GA	GD	Pts	Qualification	RMA	POR	MAR	PTZ
1	(Spain) Real Madrid	6	4	2	0	11	5	+6	14	Advance to knockout stage	—	1–1	4–2	1–0
2	(Portugal) Porto	6	3	2	1	9	8	+1	11	Advance to knockout stage	1–3	—	1–0	2–1
3	(France) Marseille	6	1	1	4	9	11	−2	4	Transfer to UEFA Cup	1–2	2–3	—	3–0
4	(Serbia and Montenegro) Partizan	6	0	3	3	3	8	−5	3		0–0	1–1	1–1	—

Source: RSSSF
16 September 2003
20:45

Real Madrid (Spain)	4–2	(France) Marseille
Roberto Carlos 29'; Ronaldo 34', 57'; Figo 61' (pen.)	Report	Drogba 26'; Van Buyten 83'

Santiago Bernabéu, Madrid
Attendance: 60,433
Referee: Wolfgang Stark (Germany)
16 September 2003
20:45

Partizan (Serbia and Montenegro)	1–1	(Portugal) Porto
Delibašić 54'	Report	Costinha 22'

Partizan Stadium, Belgrade
Attendance: 29,967
Referee: Michal Beneš (Czech Republic)

1 October 2003
20:45 (19:45 UTC+1)

Porto (Portugal)	1–3	(Spain) Real Madrid
Costinha 7'	Report	Helguera 28'; Solari 37'; Zidane 67'

Estádio das Antas, Porto
Attendance: 37,506
Referee: Pierluigi Collina (Italy)
1 October 2003
20:45

Marseille (France)	3–0	(Serbia and Montenegro) Partizan
Drogba 62', 68', 85'	Report

Stade Vélodrome, Marseille
Attendance: 54,362
Referee: Domenico Messina (Italy)

22 October 2003
20:45

Marseille (France)	2–3	(Portugal) Porto
Drogba 24'; Marlet 84'	Report	Maniche 31'; Derlei 35'; Alenichev 81'

Stade Vélodrome, Marseille
Attendance: 55,209
Referee: Kyros Vassaras (Greece)
22 October 2003
20:45

Real Madrid (Spain)	1–0	(Serbia and Montenegro) Partizan
Raúl 38'	Report

Santiago Bernabéu, Madrid
Attendance: 63,700
Referee: Massimo Busacca (Switzerland)

4 November 2003
20:45 (19:45 UTC+0)

Porto (Portugal)	1–0	(France) Marseille
Alenichev 21'	Report

Estádio das Antas, Porto
Attendance: 33,215
Referee: Graham Poll (England)
4 November 2003
20:45

Partizan (Serbia and Montenegro)	0–0	(Spain) Real Madrid
	Report

Partizan Stadium, Belgrade
Attendance: 29,000
Referee: Cosimo Bolognino (Italy)

26 November 2003
20:45

Marseille (France)	1–2	(Spain) Real Madrid
Mido 63'	Report	Beckham 35'; Ronaldo 73'

Stade Vélodrome, Marseille
Attendance: 54,745
Referee: Anders Frisk (Sweden)
26 November 2003
20:45 (19:45 UTC+0)

Porto (Portugal)	2–1	(Serbia and Montenegro) Partizan
McCarthy 25', 50'	Report	Delibašić 90+2'

Estádio das Antas, Porto
Attendance: 22,177
Referee: Paul Allaerts (Belgium)

9 December 2003
20:45

Real Madrid (Spain)	1–1	(Portugal) Porto
Solari 9'	Report	Derlei 35' (pen.)

Santiago Bernabéu, Madrid
Attendance: 48,715
Referee: Steve Bennett (England)
9 December 2003
20:45

Partizan (Serbia and Montenegro)	1–1	(France) Marseille
Delibašić 80'	Report	Mido 61'

Partizan Stadium, Belgrade
Attendance: 28,000
Referee: Manuel Mejuto González (Spain)

=== Group G ===
Pos	Team	Pld	W	D	L	GF	GA	GD	Pts	Qualification	CHE	SPP	BES	LAZ
1	(England) Chelsea	6	4	1	1	9	3	+6	13	Advance to knockout stage	—	0–0	0–2	2–1
2	(Czech Republic) Sparta Prague	6	2	2	2	5	5	0	8	Advance to knockout stage	0–1	—	2–1	1–0
3	(Turkey) Beşiktaş	6	2	1	3	5	7	−2	7	Transfer to UEFA Cup	0–2	1–0	—	0–2
4	(Italy) Lazio	6	1	2	3	6	10	−4	5		0–4	2–2	1–1	—

Source: RSSSF
16 September 2003
20:45

Sparta Prague (Czech Republic)	0–1	(England) Chelsea
	Report	Gallas 85'

Letná Stadium, Prague
Attendance: 18,997
Referee: Helmut Fleischer (Germany)
16 September 2003
20:45 (21:45 UTC+3)

Beşiktaş (Turkey)	0–2	(Italy) Lazio
	Report	Stam 37'; Fiore 77'

BJK İnönü Stadium, Istanbul
Attendance: 18,050
Referee: Kim Milton Nielsen (Denmark)

1 October 2003
20:45

Lazio (Italy)	2–2	(Czech Republic) Sparta Prague
Inzaghi 46', 61' (pen.)	Report	Sionko 27'; Poborský 35'

Stadio Olimpico, Rome
Attendance: 25,405
Referee: Claude Colombo (France)
1 October 2003
20:45 (19:45 UTC+1)

Chelsea (England)	0–2	(Turkey) Beşiktaş
	Report	Sergen 24', 29'

Stamford Bridge, London
Attendance: 32,957
Referee: Lucílio Batista (Portugal)

22 October 2003
20:45 (19:45 UTC+1)

Chelsea (England)	2–1	(Italy) Lazio
Lampard 57'; Mutu 65'	Report	Inzaghi 38'

Stamford Bridge, London
Attendance: 40,405
Referee: Terje Hauge (Norway)
22 October 2003
20:45

Sparta Prague (Czech Republic)	2–1	(Turkey) Beşiktaş
Zelenka 58'; Poborský 84'	Report	Pancu 60' (pen.)

Letná Stadium, Prague
Attendance: 14,512
Referee: Manuel Mejuto González (Spain)

4 November 2003
20:45

Lazio (Italy)	0–4	(England) Chelsea
	Report	Crespo 15'; Guðjohnsen 70'; Duff 75'; Lampard 80'

Stadio Olimpico, Rome
Attendance: 48,485
Referee: Valentin Ivanov (Russia)
4 November 2003
20:45 (21:45 UTC+2)

Beşiktaş (Turkey)	1–0	(Czech Republic) Sparta Prague
Ronaldo Guiaro 82'	Report

BJK İnönü Stadium, Istanbul
Attendance: 18,000
Referee: Massimo Busacca (Switzerland)

26 November 2003
20:45 (19:45 UTC+0)

Chelsea (England)	0–0	(Czech Republic) Sparta Prague
	Report

Stamford Bridge, London
Attendance: 40,152
Referee: Claus Bo Larsen (Denmark)
26 November 2003
20:45

Lazio (Italy)	1–1	(Turkey) Beşiktaş
Muzzi 56'	Report	Pancu 45+2' (pen.)

Stadio Olimpico, Rome
Attendance: 49,000
Referee: Markus Merk (Germany)

9 December 2003
20:45

Sparta Prague (Czech Republic)	1–0	(Italy) Lazio
Kincl 90+3'	Report

Letná Stadium, Prague
Attendance: 17,825
Referee: Lucílio Batista (Portugal)
9 December 2003
20:45

Beşiktaş (Turkey)	0–2	(England) Chelsea
	Report	Hasselbaink 77'; Bridge 85'

Arena AufSchalke, Gelsenkirchen, Germany (Note: The Beşiktaş v Chelsea match, originally scheduled to be played at BJK İnönü Stadium, Istanbul, was relocated to Arena AufSchalke, Gelsenkirchen, Germany, for security reasons due to the 2003 Istanbul bombings.)
Attendance: 52,350
Referee: Anders Frisk (Sweden)

=== Group H ===
Pos	Team	Pld	W	D	L	GF	GA	GD	Pts	Qualification	MIL	CLT	BRU	AJX
1	(Italy) Milan	6	3	1	2	4	3	+1	10	Advance to knockout stage	—	1–2	0–1	1–0
2	(Spain) Celta Vigo	6	2	3	1	7	6	+1	9	Advance to knockout stage	0–0	—	1–1	3–2
3	(Belgium) Club Brugge	6	2	2	2	5	6	−1	8	Transfer to UEFA Cup	0–1	1–1	—	2–1
4	(Netherlands) Ajax	6	2	0	4	6	7	−1	6		0–1	1–0	2–0	—

Source: RSSSF
16 September 2003
20:45

Milan (Italy)	1–0	(Netherlands) Ajax
Inzaghi 67'	Report

San Siro, Milan
Attendance: 45,931
Referee: Ľuboš Micheľ (Slovakia)
16 September 2003
20:45

Club Brugge (Belgium)	1–1	(Spain) Celta Vigo
Juanfran 84' (o.g.)	Report	Juanfran 50'

Jan Breydel Stadium, Bruges
Attendance: 26,632
Referee: Georgios Kasnaferis (Greece)

1 October 2003
20:45

Celta Vigo (Spain)	0–0	(Italy) Milan
	Report

Municipal de Balaídos, Vigo
Attendance: 23,500
Referee: Mike RIley (England)
1 October 2003
20:45

Ajax (Netherlands)	2–0	(Belgium) Club Brugge
Sonck 11', 54'	Report

Amsterdam Arena, Amsterdam
Attendance: 49,371
Referee: Graham Barber (England)

22 October 2003
20:45

Ajax (Netherlands)	1–0	(Spain) Celta Vigo
Ibrahimović 53'	Report

Amsterdam Arena, Amsterdam
Attendance: 48,218
Referee: Markus Merk (Germany)
22 October 2003
20:45

Milan (Italy)	0–1	(Belgium) Club Brugge
	Report	Mendoza 33'

San Siro, Milan
Attendance: 43,823
Referee: Tom Henning Øvrebø (Norway)

4 November 2003
20:45

Celta Vigo (Spain)	3–2	(Netherlands) Ajax
Luccin 25' (pen.); Milošević 39'; Vágner 63'	Report	Sonck 53'; Van der Vaart 82'

Municipal de Balaídos, Vigo
Attendance: 18,700
Referee: Gilles Veissière (France)
4 November 2003
20:45

Club Brugge (Belgium)	0–1	(Italy) Milan
	Report	Kaká 86'

Jan Breydel Stadium, Bruges
Attendance: 27,834
Referee: Herbert Fandel (Germany)

26 November 2003
20:45

Ajax (Netherlands)	0–1	(Italy) Milan
	Report	Shevchenko 52'

Amsterdam Arena, Amsterdam
Attendance: 50,210
Referee: Urs Meier (Switzerland)
26 November 2003
20:45

Celta Vigo (Spain)	1–1	(Belgium) Club Brugge
Mostovoi 74'	Report	Lange 90+2'

Municipal de Balaídos, Vigo
Attendance: 18,173
Referee: Éric Poulat (France)

9 December 2003
20:45

Milan (Italy)	1–2	(Spain) Celta Vigo
Kaká 40'	Report	Jesuli 42'; Ignacio 71'

San Siro, Milan
Attendance: 36,207
Referee: Kyros Vassaras (Greece)
9 December 2003
20:45

Club Brugge (Belgium)	2–1	(Netherlands) Ajax
Lange 27'; Sæternes 84'	Report	Sonck 42' (pen.)

Jan Breydel Stadium, Bruges
Attendance: 28,041
Referee: Domenico Messina (Italy)
