= 2003–04 UEFA Champions League knockout stage =

International football competition

The knockout stage of the 2003–04 UEFA Champions League ran from 24 February 2004 until the final at the Arena AufSchalke in Gelsenkirchen, Germany, on 26 May 2004. The knockout stage involved the 16 teams that finished in the top two in each of their groups in the group stage.

Times are CET/CEST, (Note: CET (UTC+1) for matches to 24 March 2004, and CEST (UTC+2) for matches from 6 April 2004.) as listed by UEFA (local times, if different, are in parentheses).

== Format ==
Each tie in the knockout stage, apart from the final, was played over two legs, with each team playing one leg at home. The team that had the higher aggregate score over the two legs progressed to the next round. In the event that aggregate scores finished level, the team that scored more goals away from home over the two legs progressed. If away goals were also equal, 30 minutes of silver goal extra time was applied, whereby the team who leads the game at the half-time break during the extra time period would be declared the winner. If the scores were still level after the initial 15 minutes of extra time, play would continue for a further 15 minutes. The away goals rule applied again after extra time. If there were goals scored during extra time and the aggregate score was still level, the visiting team qualified by virtue of more away goals scored. If no goals were scored during extra time, the tie was decided via a penalty shoot-out.

The draw mechanisms for each round is as follows:

- In the draw for the round of 16, matches were played between the winner of one group and the runner-up of a different group, with the group winner hosting the second leg. Teams from the same country or the same group must not be drawn against each other.
- In the draw for the quarterfinals onwards, these restrictions do not apply, and teams from the same group or same association may be drawn together.

In the final, the tie was played over just one leg at a neutral venue. If scores were level at the end of normal time in the final, then 30 minutes of silver goal extra time was applied, whereby the team who leads the game at the half-time break during the extra time period would be declared the winner. If the scores were still level after the initial 15 minutes of extra time, play would continue for a further 15 minutes. If teams still tied, the tie was decided by penalty shoot-out.

== Qualified teams ==
Key to colours
Seeded in round of 16 draw
Unseeded in round of 16 draw

Group	Winners	Runners-up
A	(France) Lyon	(Germany) Bayern Munich
B	(England) Arsenal	(Russia) Lokomotiv Moscow
C	(France) Monaco	(Spain) Deportivo La Coruña
D	(Italy) Juventus	(Spain) Real Sociedad
E	(England) Manchester United	(Germany) VfB Stuttgart
F	(Spain) Real Madrid	(Portugal) Porto
G	(England) Chelsea	(Czech Republic) Sparta Prague
H	(Italy) Milan	(Spain) Celta Vigo

== Bracket ==
Round of 16
(Germany) Bayern Munich	1	0	1
(Spain) Real Madrid	1	1	2
(Russia) Lokomotiv Moscow	2	0	2
(France) Monaco (a)	1	1	2
(Germany) VfB Stuttgart	0	0	0
(England) Chelsea	1	0	1
(Spain) Celta Vigo	2	0	2
(England) Arsenal	3	2	5
(Portugal) Porto	2	1	3
(England) Manchester United	1	1	2
(Spain) Real Sociedad	0	0	0
(France) Lyon	1	1	2
(Czech Republic) Sparta Prague	0	1	1
(Italy) Milan	0	4	4
(Spain) Deportivo La Coruña	1	1	2
(Italy) Juventus	0	0	0

Quarter-finals
(Spain) Real Madrid	4	1	5
(France) Monaco (a)	2	3	5
(England) Chelsea	1	2	3
(England) Arsenal	1	1	2
(Portugal) Porto	2	2	4
(France) Lyon	0	2	2
(Italy) Milan	4	0	4
(Spain) Deportivo La Coruña	1	4	5

Semi-finals
(France) Monaco	3	2	5
(England) Chelsea	1	2	3
(Portugal) Porto	0	1	1
(Spain) Deportivo La Coruña	0	0	0

Final
26 May – Gelsenkirchen
(France) Monaco	0
(Portugal) Porto	3

== Round of 16 ==
=== Summary ===
Team 1	Agg.	Team 2	1st leg	2nd leg
Bayern Munich (Germany)	1–2	(Spain) Real Madrid	1–1	0–1
Celta Vigo (Spain)	2–5	(England) Arsenal	2–3	0–2
Deportivo La Coruña (Spain)	2–0	(Italy) Juventus	1–0	1–0
Lokomotiv Moscow (Russia)	2–2 (a)	(France) Monaco	2–1	0–1
Porto (Portugal)	3–2	(England) Manchester United	2–1	1–1
Real Sociedad (Spain)	0–2	(France) Lyon	0–1	0–1
Sparta Prague (Czech Republic)	1–4	(Italy) Milan	0–0	1–4
VfB Stuttgart (Germany)	0–1	(England) Chelsea	0–1	0–0

=== Matches ===
24 February 2004
20:45

Bayern Munich (Germany)	1–1	(Spain) Real Madrid
Makaay 75'	Report	Roberto Carlos 83'

Olympic Stadium, Munich
Attendance: 59,000
Referee: Terje Hauge (Norway)
10 March 2004
20:45

Real Madrid (Spain)	1–0	(Germany) Bayern Munich
Zidane 32'	Report

Santiago Bernabéu, Madrid
Attendance: 78,000
Referee: Urs Meier (Switzerland)

Real Madrid won 2–1 on aggregate.

24 February 2004
20:45

Celta Vigo (Spain)	2–3	(England) Arsenal
Edu 27'; José Ignacio 64'	Report	Edu 18', 58'; Pires 80'

Balaídos, Vigo
Attendance: 19,500
Referee: Anders Frisk (Sweden)
10 March 2004
20:45 (19:45 UTC+0)

Arsenal (England)	2–0	(Spain) Celta Vigo
Henry 14', 34'	Report

Highbury, London
Attendance: 35,402
Referee: Pierluigi Collina (Italy)

Arsenal won 5–2 on aggregate.

25 February 2004
20:45

Deportivo La Coruña (Spain)	1–0	(Italy) Juventus
Luque 37'	Report

Estadio Riazor, A Coruña
Attendance: 22,266
Referee: Gilles Veissiere (France)
9 March 2004
20:45

Juventus (Italy)	0–1	(Spain) Deportivo La Coruña
	Report	Pandiani 12'

Stadio delle Alpi, Turin
Attendance: 24,680
Referee: Ľuboš Micheľ (Slovakia)

Deportivo La Coruña won 2–0 on aggregate.

24 February 2004
16:30 (18:30 UTC+3)

Lokomotiv Moscow (Russia)	2–1	(France) Monaco
Izmailov 32'; Maminov 59'	Report	Morientes 69'

Lokomotiv Stadium, Moscow
Attendance: 21,500
Referee: Manuel Mejuto González (Spain)
10 March 2004
20:45

Monaco (France)	1–0	(Russia) Lokomotiv Moscow
Pršo 60'	Report

Stade Louis II, Monaco
Attendance: 16,729
Referee: Lucílio Batista (Portugal)

2–2 on aggregate; Monaco won on away goals.

25 February 2004
20:45 (19:45 UTC+0)

Porto (Portugal)	2–1	(England) Manchester United
McCarthy 29', 78'	Report	Fortune 14'

Estádio do Dragão, Porto
Attendance: 49,977
Referee: Herbert Fandel (Germany)
9 March 2004
20:45 (19:45 UTC+0)

Manchester United (England)	1–1	(Portugal) Porto
Scholes 32'	Report	Costinha 90'

Old Trafford, Manchester
Attendance: 67,029
Referee: Valentin Ivanov (Russia)

Porto won 3–2 on aggregate.

25 February 2004
20:45

Real Sociedad (Spain)	0–1	(France) Lyon
	Report	Schürrer 18' (o.g.)

Anoeta Stadium, San Sebastián
Attendance: 28,000
Referee: Massimo De Santis (Italy)
9 March 2004
20:45

Lyon (France)	1–0	(Spain) Real Sociedad
Juninho 77'	Report

Stade de Gerland, Lyon
Attendance: 38,914
Referee: Mike Riley (England)

Lyon won 2–0 on aggregate.

24 February 2004
20:45

Sparta Prague (Czech Republic)	0–0	(Italy) Milan
	Report

Letná Stadium, Prague
Attendance: 20,640
Referee: Graham Poll (England)
10 March 2004
20:45

Milan (Italy)	4–1	(Czech Republic) Sparta Prague
Inzaghi 45+2'; Shevchenko 66', 79'; Gattuso 85'	Report	Jun 59'

San Siro, Milan
Attendance: 49,364
Referee: Markus Merk (Germany)

Milan won 4–1 on aggregate.

25 February 2004
20:45

VfB Stuttgart (Germany)	0–1	(England) Chelsea
	Report	Meira 12' (o.g.)

Gottlieb-Daimler-Stadion, Stuttgart
Attendance: 43,000
Referee: Kyros Vassaras (Greece)
9 March 2004
20:45 (19:45 UTC+0)

Chelsea (England)	0–0	(Germany) VfB Stuttgart
	Report

Stamford Bridge, London
Attendance: 36,657
Referee: Kim Milton Nielsen (Denmark)

Chelsea won 1–0 on aggregate.

== Quarter-finals ==
=== Summary ===
Team 1	Agg.	Team 2	1st leg	2nd leg
Chelsea (England)	3–2	(England) Arsenal	1–1	2–1
Milan (Italy)	4–5	(Spain) Deportivo La Coruña	4–1	0–4
Porto (Portugal)	4–2	(France) Lyon	2–0	2–2
Real Madrid (Spain)	5–5 (a)	(France) Monaco	4–2	1–3

=== Matches ===
24 March 2004
20:45 (19:45 UTC+0)

Chelsea (England)	1–1	(England) Arsenal
Guðjohnsen 53'	Report	Pires 59'

Stamford Bridge, London
Attendance: 40,778
Referee: Manuel Mejuto González (Spain)
6 April 2004
20:45 (19:45 UTC+1)

Arsenal (England)	1–2	(England) Chelsea
Reyes 45+1'	Report	Lampard 51'; Bridge 87'

Highbury, London
Attendance: 35,468
Referee: Markus Merk (Germany)

Chelsea won 3–2 on aggregate.

23 March 2004
20:45

Milan (Italy)	4–1	(Spain) Deportivo La Coruña
Kaká 45', 49'; Shevchenko 46'; Pirlo 53'	Report	Pandiani 11'

San Siro, Milan
Attendance: 60,335
Referee: Valentin Ivanov (Russia)
7 April 2004
20:45

Deportivo La Coruña (Spain)	4–0	(Italy) Milan
Pandiani 5'; Valerón 35'; Luque 44'; Fran 76'	Report

Estadio Riazor, A Coruña
Attendance: 24,887
Referee: Urs Meier (Switzerland)

Deportivo La Coruña won 5–4 on aggregate.

23 March 2004
20:45 (19:45 UTC+0)

Porto (Portugal)	2–0	(France) Lyon
Deco 44'; Carvalho 71'	Report

Estádio do Dragão, Porto
Attendance: 46,910
Referee: Terje Hauge (Norway)
7 April 2004
20:45

Lyon (France)	2–2	(Portugal) Porto
Luyindula 14'; Élber 90'	Report	Maniche 6', 47'

Stade de Gerland, Lyon
Attendance: 39,103
Referee: Anders Frisk (Sweden)

Porto won 4–2 on aggregate.

24 March 2004
20:45

Real Madrid (Spain)	4–2	(France) Monaco
Helguera 51'; Zidane 70'; Figo 77'; Ronaldo 81'	Report	Squillaci 43'; Morientes 83'

Santiago Bernabéu, Madrid
Attendance: 69,327
Referee: Ľuboš Micheľ (Slovakia)
6 April 2004
20:45

Monaco (France)	3–1	(Spain) Real Madrid
Giuly 45+1', 66'; Morientes 48'	Report	Raúl 36'

Stade Louis II, Monaco
Attendance: 17,289
Referee: Pierluigi Collina (Italy)

5–5 on aggregate; Monaco won on away goals.

== Semi-finals ==
=== Summary ===
Team 1	Agg.	Team 2	1st leg	2nd leg
Monaco (France)	5–3	(England) Chelsea	3–1	2–2
Porto (Portugal)	1–0	(Spain) Deportivo La Coruña	0–0	1–0

=== Matches ===
20 April 2004
20:45

Monaco (France)	3–1	(England) Chelsea
Pršo 17'; Morientes 78'; Nonda 83'	Report	Crespo 22'

Stade Louis II, Monaco
Attendance: 17,732
Referee: Urs Meier (Switzerland)
5 May 2004
20:45 (19:45 UTC+1)

Chelsea (England)	2–2	(France) Monaco
Grønkjær 22'; Lampard 44'	Report	Ibarra 45+2'; Morientes 60'

Stamford Bridge, London
Attendance: 37,132
Referee: Anders Frisk (Sweden)

Monaco won 5–3 on aggregate.

21 April 2004
20:45 (19:45 UTC+1)

Porto (Portugal)	0–0	(Spain) Deportivo La Coruña
	Report

Estádio do Dragão, Porto
Attendance: 50,818
Referee: Markus Merk (Germany)
4 May 2004
20:45

Deportivo La Coruña (Spain)	0–1	(Portugal) Porto
	Report	Derlei 60' (pen.)

Estadio Riazor, A Coruña
Attendance: 33,621
Referee: Pierluigi Collina (Italy)

Porto won 1–0 on aggregate.

== Final ==
The final was played on 26 May 2004 at the Arena AufSchalke in Gelsenkirchen, Germany.

26 May 2004
20:45

Monaco (France)	0–3	(Portugal) Porto
	Report	Carlos Alberto 39'; Deco 71'; Alenichev 75'

Arena AufSchalke, Gelsenkirchen
Attendance: 53,053
Referee: Kim Milton Nielsen (Denmark)
