= Kim Milton Nielsen =

Danish football referee

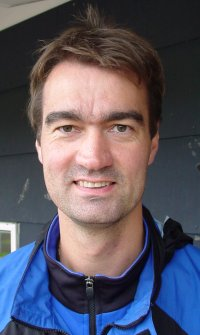
- Full name: Kim Milton Nielsen
- Born: 3 August 1960 (age 66); Copenhagen, Denmark
- Other occupation: IT manager

Domestic
Years	League	Role
1975–2006	DBU	Referee

International
Years	League	Role
1988–2005	FIFA–listed	Referee

Kim Milton Nielsen (Danish pronunciation: [ˈkem ˈmiltn̩ ˈne̝l.sn̩]; born 3 August 1960) is a Danish former international football referee.

== Career ==
An IT manager by trade, Nielsen is noted for his impressive height of 1.96 m, making him taller than most players. Nielsen began refereeing at 15 years of age, as he wanted to know the Laws of Football. A decade later, he began taking charge of Danish top-flight games, and he was awarded his FIFA international badge in 1988 when he was still in his late 20s.

His career includes 154 internationals and 53 UEFA Champions League games. In 1993, he earned his first major UEFA call-up for the 1992 UEFA Super Cup first leg between SV Werder Bremen and FC Barcelona. An appointment for a major continental club final followed the next year – the 1994 UEFA Cup final first leg between SV Austria Salzburg and Inter Milan.

Nielsen refereed the Russia–Germany Group C match at UEFA Euro 96 in England, and followed this up with duty at the 1998 FIFA World Cup in France. He took charge of two matches, including the round of 16 clash between England and Argentina in Saint-Étienne, where he is remembered for controversially sending off England's David Beckham for kicking out at Argentina's Diego Simeone after the Argentine had fouled him. England went on to lose the match on penalties, and Beckham was blamed and vilified by the English tabloids for causing the loss as a result of his sending-off. He was noted as the newsmaker of June 1998 on the BBC website where he gave his thoughts about the match and Beckham's sending off.

At UEFA Euro 2000, Nielsen was put in charge of the Germany-Romania and Turkey-Belgium encounters, although the latter match ended in disappointment as he was forced out of the competition with a leg injury. He was replaced by Günter Benkö. He got to officiate another prestigious match as he was named as the referee of 2001 Intercontinental Cup between Bayern Munich and Boca Juniors, which ended in a 1–0 victory for Bayern after extra time. The 2002 FIFA World Cup represented another milestone, as he officiated the semi-final between eventual champions Brazil and Turkey (1–0).

He received another accolade after being appointed as the referee for the 2004 UEFA Champions League Final between AS Monaco and Porto at the Arena AufSchalke in Gelsenkirchen; the latter side won the match 3–0. He was on duty in Portugal as one of the 12 UEFA Euro 2004 referees.

After his performance during the 2004–05 UEFA Champions League quarter-finals between PSV Eindhoven and Olympique Lyonnais, Lyon's president Jean-Michel Aulas complained about different gifts and accolades Nielsen allegedly received from Dutch officials.

In a 2005–06 UEFA Champions League group stage match between Spanish side Villarreal and Manchester United, Nielsen showed a second yellow card, sending off Manchester United's Wayne Rooney for sarcastically clapping in his face after he had initially been shown a yellow card. 'Even sarcastic play is not allowed, the referee cannot accept that,' Nielsen said of his decision to BBC Radio 5 Live.

In 2005, Nielsen reached the then-FIFA regulated age limit of 45. He ended his refereeing career on 16 May 2006, following the last game of the Danish Superliga championship.

== Major matches refereed ==
Date	Match	Tournament	Venue	Result	Ref
10 February 1993	SV Werder Bremen vs. FC Barcelona	1992 European Super Cup final (first leg)	Weser-Stadion, Bremen	1–1 (2–3 on aggregate)	
26 April 1994	SV Austria Salzburg vs. Inter Milan	1994 UEFA Cup final (first leg)	Ernst-Happel-Stadion, Vienna	0–2 (0–2 on aggregate)	
27 November 2001	Bayern Munich vs. Boca Juniors	2001 Intercontinental Cup final	National Stadium, Tokyo	1–0 (a.e.t.)	
26 May 2004	AS Monaco vs. Porto	2004 UEFA Champions League final	Arena AufSchalke, Gelsenkirchen	0–3	
