= 1989–90 NK Dinamo Zagreb season =

Dinamo Zagreb
1989–90 season
- Chairman: Zdenko Mahmet
- Manager: Josip Kuže
- Stadium: Stadion Maksimir
- 1. Federal League: 2nd place
- Marshal Tito Cup: Second round (R16)
- Top goalscorer: Davor Šuker (12)
- Highest home attendance: 40,341 vs Hajduk Split
- Lowest home attendance: 6,179 vs Sarajevo
- Average home league attendance: 13,193

The 1989–90 season was the 44th season of competitive football played by Dinamo Zagreb. The season was marked by a football riot on May 13, 1990, at Maksimir Stadium in Zagreb on a match between Dinamo Zagreb and Red Star Belgrade.

== Squad ==
Note: Flags indicate national team as defined under FIFA eligibility rules; some limited exceptions apply. Players may hold more than one non-FIFA nationality.

No.	Pos.	Nation	Player
---	GK	(Socialist Federal Republic of Yugoslavia) YUG	Miralem Ibrahimović
---	GK	(Socialist Federal Republic of Yugoslavia) YUG	Dražen Ladić
---	DF	(Socialist Federal Republic of Yugoslavia) YUG	Željko Cupan
---	DF	(Socialist Federal Republic of Yugoslavia) YUG	Dražen Biškup
---	DF	(Socialist Federal Republic of Yugoslavia) YUG	Slavko Ištvanić
---	DF	(Socialist Federal Republic of Yugoslavia) YUG	Zvonko Lipovac
---	DF	(Socialist Federal Republic of Yugoslavia) YUG	Damir Lesjak
---	DF	(Socialist Federal Republic of Yugoslavia) YUG	Zoran Mamić
---	DF	(Socialist Federal Republic of Yugoslavia) YUG	Andrej Panadić
---	DF	(Socialist Federal Republic of Yugoslavia) YUG	Vlado Čapljić
---	DF	(Socialist Federal Republic of Yugoslavia) YUG	Milivoj Bračun
---	DF	(Socialist Federal Republic of Yugoslavia) YUG	Miodrag Đurđević
---	DF	(Socialist Federal Republic of Yugoslavia) YUG	Muhamed Preljević
---	MF	(Socialist Federal Republic of Yugoslavia) YUG	Dražen Besek
---	MF	(Socialist Federal Republic of Yugoslavia) YUG	Zvonimir Boban
---	MF	(Socialist Federal Republic of Yugoslavia) YUG	Davor Matić

No.	Pos.	Nation	Player
---	MF	(Socialist Federal Republic of Yugoslavia) YUG	Dražen Boban
---	MF	(Socialist Federal Republic of Yugoslavia) YUG	Mladen Mladenović
---	MF	(Socialist Federal Republic of Yugoslavia) YUG	Draženko Prskalo
---	MF	(Socialist Federal Republic of Yugoslavia) YUG	Kujtim Shala
---	MF	(Socialist Federal Republic of Yugoslavia) YUG	Vjekoslav Škrinjar
---	MF	(Socialist Federal Republic of Yugoslavia) YUG	Dževad Turković
---	MF	(Socialist Federal Republic of Yugoslavia) YUG	Dubravko Pavličić
---	FW	(Socialist Federal Republic of Yugoslavia) YUG	Zoran Škerjanc
---	FW	(Socialist Federal Republic of Yugoslavia) YUG	Stjepan Deverić
---	FW	(Socialist Federal Republic of Yugoslavia) YUG	Fabijan Komljenović
---	FW	(Socialist Federal Republic of Yugoslavia) YUG	Nedeljko Topić
---	FW	(Socialist Federal Republic of Yugoslavia) YUG	Igor Cvitanović
---	FW	(Socialist Federal Republic of Yugoslavia) YUG	Stanislav Komočar
---	FW	(Socialist Federal Republic of Yugoslavia) YUG	Alen Peternac
---	FW	(Socialist Federal Republic of Yugoslavia) YUG	Davor Šuker

== First Federal League ==
=== Matches ===
Date	Opponents	Home / Away	Result (F – A)	Dinamo scorers	Attendance
30 Jul 1989	Spartak	H	1 – 0	Šuker	10,279
5 Aug 1989	Sloboda	A	0 – 0 (5 – 3 p)		2,725
13 Aug 1989	Vojvodina	H	2 – 0	Panadić (2)	12,287
19 Aug 1989	Vardar	A	4 – 0	Panadić, Šuker, Mladenović (2)	6,296
27 Aug 1989	Željezničar	H	2 – 0	Šuker, Škerjanc	8,026
10 Sep 1989	Osijek	A	0 – 1		12,468
17 Sep 1989	Hajduk	H	2 – 0	Shala, Boban	40,341
23 Sep 1989	Partizan	A	1 – 1 (4 – 3 p)	Shala	14,035
1 Oct 1989	Radnički	H	3 – 0	Šuker (p), Mladenović, Boban	11,308
7 Oct 1989	Borac	A	0 – 1		10,686
15 Oct 1989	Rijeka	H	1 – 1 (4 – 3 p)	Boban	8,123
22 Oct 1989	Budućnost	A	0 – 2		6,680
5 Nov 1989	Sarajevo	H	6 – 0	Shala, Boban, Mladenović, Škerjanc, Cvitanović (2)	6,179
11 Nov 1989	Rad	A	2 – 0	Šuker, Mladenović	515
19 Nov 1989	Olimpija	H	2 – 1	Boban, Šuker	8,303
26 Nov 1989	Red Star	A	0 – 0 (3 – 2 p)		23,985
3 Dec 1989	Velež	H	3 – 0	Mladenović, Ištvanić, Cvitanović	9,513
9 Dec 1989	Spartak	A	1 – 1 (6 – 5 p)	Panadić	1,005
17 Dec 1989	Sloboda	H	5 – 0	Mladenović, Boban (2), Cvitanović, Shala	9,513
18 Feb 1990	Vojvodina	A	1 – 1 (4 – 3 p)	Shala	4,235
25 Feb 1990	Vardar	H	3 – 0	Shala, Šuker (2)	16,189
4 Mar 1990	Željezničar	A	0 – 0 (0 – 2 p)		9,433
11 Mar 1990	Osijek	H	3 – 1	Šuker, Mladenović, Boban	13,347
18 Mar 1990	Hajduk	A	3 – 2	Boban, Shala, Šuker,	41,809
25 Mar 1988	Partizan	H	2 – 1	Lesjak, Shala	27,215
1 Apr 1990	Radnički	A	1 – 1 (6 – 5 p)	Besek	8,300
8 Apr 1990	Borac	H	3 – 1	Šuker, Mladenović, Cvitanović	9,749
15 Apr 1990	Rijeka	A	1 – 1 (1 – 4 p)	Šuker	7,038
22 Apr 1990	Budućnost	H	0 – 0 (4 – 3 p)		12,276
25 Apr 1990	Sarajevo	A	3 – 0 (f)		6,917
29 Apr 1990	Rad	H	0 – 0 (4 – 5 p)		8,438
6 May 1990	Olimpija	A	0 – 3		6,938
13 May 1990	Red Star	H	0 – 3 (f)		N/A
16 May 1990	Velež	A	1 – 2	Mladenović	3,491

=== Classification ===
Pos	Team	Pld	W	PKW	PKL	L	GF	GA	GD	Pts	Qualification or relegation
1	Red Star Belgrade (C)	34	24	3	2	5	79	29	+50	51	Qualification for European Cup first round
2	Dinamo Zagreb	34	16	8	3	7	53	25	+28	40	Qualification for UEFA Cup first round
3	Hajduk Split	34	18	2	1	13	50	35	+15	38	Banned from European competition (Note: In November 1987, UEFA banned Hajduk Split from European competitions for two seasons. The immediate catalyst for the punishment was crowd trouble during club's 1987–88 European Cup Winners' Cup match against Marseille on 5 November 1987, however, repeated prior incidents at Hajduk's European home matches throughout early-to-mid 1980s (such as the 1983–84 UEFA Cup semifinal first leg infamous 'rooster incident' against Tottenham Hotspur) also contributed to the decision. Since Hajduk's 1987–88 Yugoslav League performance failed to qualify the club for 1988–89 European competition, the punishment was enacted for seasons when Hajduk did manage to qualify: 1989–90 and 1990–91.)
4	Partizan	34	18	1	3	12	51	42	+9	37	Qualification for UEFA Cup first round
5	Rad	34	16	4	2	12	41	31	+10	36	

Source: rsssf.org
Rules for classification: 1) points; 2) goal difference; 3) number of goals scored.
(C) Champion

== Marshal Tito Cup ==
Date	Round	Opponents	Home / Away	Result (F – A)	Dinamo scorers
1989	First round	Napredak Kruševac	H	3 – 0	
1989	Second round	Partizan	H	2 – 3	
1989	Second round	Partizan	A	0 – 1	

== See also ==
- 1989–90 Yugoslav First League
- 1989–90 Yugoslav Cup
- Dinamo Zagreb-Red Star Belgrade riot
