= 1990–91 NK Dinamo Zagreb season =

Dinamo Zagreb
1990–91 season
- President: Josip Šoić
- Manager: Josip Kuže (until 1 October 1990); Zdenko Kobeščak; Vlatko Marković
- 1. Federal League: 2nd place
- Marshal Tito Cup: Quarter-finals
- UEFA Cup: First round
- Top goalscorer: League: Davor Šuker (22); All: Davor Šuker (25)
- Highest home attendance: 17,052 vs Partizan (17 March 1991)
- Lowest home attendance: 1,445 vs Radnički Niš (5 December 1990)
- Average home league attendance: 6,040

The 1990–91 season was Dinamo Zagreb's 45th season in the Yugoslav First League. It proved to be their last season played in the Yugoslav league system. Following the season's completion and due to the breakup of Yugoslavia, Croatian clubs, including Dinamo, decided to leave the league to form Prva HNL.

Dinamo Zagreb finished runners-up in the league, with ten points behind champions Red Star Belgrade. In their last appearance in the Yugoslav Cup Dinamo have beaten Borac Bosanski Šamac in the round of 32 (7–0) and FK Sarajevo in the round of 16 (5–1 on aggregate) before reaching the quarter-finals where they were knocked out by Borac Banja Luka (2–3 on aggregate).

In European competitions Dinamo were drawn to play Italy's Atalanta in the 1990–91 UEFA Cup. After a goalless draw in Bergamo in the first leg, the return leg at Maksimir ended in a 1–1 draw, with Atalanta going through on away goals rule.

== Players ==
=== Squad ===
The following is the full list of players who appeared in league matches for Dinamo in the 1990–91 season.

Note: Flags indicate national team as defined under FIFA eligibility rules; some limited exceptions apply. Players may hold more than one non-FIFA nationality.

No.	Pos.	Nation	Player
---	GK	(Socialist Federal Republic of Yugoslavia) YUG	Miralem Ibrahimović
---	GK	(Socialist Federal Republic of Yugoslavia) YUG	Dražen Ladić
---	DF	(Socialist Federal Republic of Yugoslavia) YUG	Željko Cupan
---	DF	(Costa Rica) CRC	Rónald González Brenes
---	DF	(Socialist Federal Republic of Yugoslavia) YUG	Slavko Ištvanić
---	DF	(Socialist Federal Republic of Yugoslavia) YUG	Zvonko Lipovac
---	DF	(Socialist Federal Republic of Yugoslavia) YUG	Damir Lesjak
---	DF	(Socialist Federal Republic of Yugoslavia) YUG	Zoran Mamić
---	DF	(Socialist Federal Republic of Yugoslavia) YUG	Andrej Panadić
---	DF	(Socialist Federal Republic of Yugoslavia) YUG	Saša Peršon
---	DF	(Socialist Federal Republic of Yugoslavia) YUG	Željko Petrović
---	DF	(Socialist Federal Republic of Yugoslavia) YUG	Muhamed Preljević
---	MF	(Socialist Federal Republic of Yugoslavia) YUG	Dražen Besek
---	MF	(Socialist Federal Republic of Yugoslavia) YUG	Zvonimir Boban

No.	Pos.	Nation	Player
---	MF	(Socialist Federal Republic of Yugoslavia) YUG	Josip Gašpar
---	MF	(Socialist Federal Republic of Yugoslavia) YUG	Mladen Mladenović
---	MF	(Socialist Federal Republic of Yugoslavia) YUG	Draženko Prskalo
---	MF	(Socialist Federal Republic of Yugoslavia) YUG	Kujtim Shala
---	MF	(Socialist Federal Republic of Yugoslavia) YUG	Vjekoslav Škrinjar
---	MF	(Socialist Federal Republic of Yugoslavia) YUG	Dževad Turković
---	MF	(Socialist Federal Republic of Yugoslavia) YUG	Gregor Židan
---	FW	(Socialist Federal Republic of Yugoslavia) YUG	Željko Adžić
---	FW	(Socialist Federal Republic of Yugoslavia) YUG	Stjepan Deverić
---	FW	(Socialist Federal Republic of Yugoslavia) YUG	Primož Gliha
---	FW	(Socialist Federal Republic of Yugoslavia) YUG	Miljenko Kovačić
---	FW	(Costa Rica) CRC	Hernán Medford
---	FW	(Socialist Federal Republic of Yugoslavia) YUG	Alen Peternac
---	FW	(Socialist Federal Republic of Yugoslavia) YUG	Davor Šuker

== First Federal League ==
=== Matches ===
M	Date	Opponents	Venue	Result	Score F–A	Dinamo scorers	Attendance	Ref
1	5 August 1990	Budućnost	A	L	0–1		3,606	
2	12 August 1990	Velež	H (N)	W	2–1	Šuker (2)	2,944	
3	19 August 1990	Rijeka	A	D	0–0 (1–3 p)		3,301	
4	26 August 1990	Borac Banja Luka	H	W	2–1	Mladenović, Medford	9,168	
5	1 September 1990	Partizan	A	L	1–2	Šuker	12,483	
6	15 September 1990	Zemun	H	W	2–0	Šuker (2)	7,825	
7	26 September 1990	Vojvodina	A	L	1–3	Šuker	4,500	
8	29 September 1990	Osijek	H	D	1–1 (6–7 p)	Boban	3,894	
9	7 October 1990	Sarajevo	A	D	0–0 (5–4 p)		1,629	
10	13 October 1990	Hajduk Split	H	D	1–1 (4–3 p)	Šuker	13,229	
11	21 October 1990	Spartak Subotica	A	D	0–0 (4–2 p)		1,600	
12	4 November 1990	Sloboda Tuzla	H	W	3–1	Boban (2), Medford	2,131	
13	18 November 1990	Red Star	A	L	1–3	Petrović	18,130	
14	25 November 1990	Rad	H	W	2–1	Mladenović, Prskalo	2,267	
15	2 December 1990	Proleter Zrenjanin	A	L	1–3	Medford	4,800	
16	5 December 1990	Radnički Niš	H	W	2–0	Šuker, Boban	1,445	
17	9 December 1990	Željezničar	A	W	3–1	Preljević, Cupan, Mladenović	1,404	
18	16 December 1990	Olimpija	H	W	3–0	Šuker (pen.), Boban, Mladenović	3,117	
19	17 February 1991	Budućnost	H	W	6–0	Šuker (pen.), Boban, Shala (2), Mladenović, Adžić	3,650	
20	24 February 1991	Velež	A	W	2–1	Boban, Škrinjar	5,085	
21	3 March 1991	Rijeka	H	W	3–1	Adžić, Shala, Boban	7,837	
22	10 March 1991	Borac Banja Luka	A	D	1–1 (5–6 p)	Boban	6,607	
23	17 March 1991	Partizan	H	D	0–0 (4–3 p)		17,052	
24	22 March 1991	Zemun	A	D	1–1 (7–6 p)	Petrović	1,370	
25	7 April 1991	Vojvodina	H	D	2–2 (7–6 p)	Židan, Šuker	4,971	
26	14 April 1991	Osijek	A	L	1–2	Šuker	7,589	
27	21 April 1991	Sarajevo	H	W	8–1	Šuker (2), Boban (3), Gašpar, Shala, Mladenović	4,208	
28	27 April 1991	Hajduk Split	A	W	2–1	Šuker (2)	28,000	
29	5 May 1991	Spartak Subotica	H	W	3–1	Šuker (2), Boban	3,842	
30	11 May 1991	Sloboda Tuzla	A	W	3–0	Gliha, Deverić, Boban	972	
31	18 May 1991	Red Star	H	W	3–2	Šuker (pen.), Gašpar, Židan	14,546	
32	26 May 1991	Rad	A	W	2–0	Šuker, Boban	1,100	
33	2 June 1991	Proleter Zrenjanin	H	W	4–1	Šuker (2), Shala, Deverić	4,964	
34	5 June 1991	Radnički Niš	A	D	1–1 (4–5 p)	Adžić	6,500	
35	9 June 1991	Željezničar	H	W	2–1	Shala (2)	1,580	
36	16 June 1991	Olimpija	A	W	3–1	Boban, Shala, Gliha	1,606	

=== Standings ===
Pos	Team	Pld	W	PKW	PKL	L	GF	GA	GD	Pts	Qualification or relegation
1	Red Star Belgrade (C)	36	25	4	2	5	88	35	+53	54	Qualification for European Cup first round
2	Dinamo Zagreb (Note: After the season, Croatian and Slovenian clubs left the Yugoslav federation and formed their own leagues. Dinamo Zagreb, Hajduk Split, Osijek and Rijeka joined 1992 Prva HNL, while Olimpija joined 1991–92 Slovenian PrvaLiga.)	36	20	6	4	6	72	36	+36	46	Qualification for UEFA Cup first round
3	Partizan	36	18	5	3	10	62	36	+26	41	Qualification for UEFA Cup first round
4	Proleter Zrenjanin	36	17	1	3	15	50	49	+1	35	Qualification for Intertoto Cup
5	Borac Banja Luka	36	14	7	4	11	42	38	+4	35	

Source: rsssf.org
Rules for classification: 1) points; 2) goal difference; 3) number of goals scored.
(C) Champion

=== Results summary ===
Overall								Home						Away					
Pld	W	D	L	GF	GA	GD	Pts	W	D	L	GF	GA	GD	W	D	L	GF	GA	GD
36	20	10	6	72	36	+36	50	14	4	0	49	15	+34	6	6	6	23	21	+2

Last updated: 2 October 2024.
Source: rsssf.org

== Marshal Tito Cup ==
Round	Date	Opponents	Venue	Result	Score F–A	Scorers	Attendance	Ref
R32	8 August 1990	Borac Bosanski Šamac	A	W	7–0			
R16 (1st leg)	15 August 1990	Sarajevo	H (N)	W	1–0			
R16 (2nd leg)	22 August 1990	Sarajevo	A	W	4–1			
QF (1st leg)	10 October 1990	Borac Banja Luka	A	L	2–3			
QF (2nd leg)	21 November 1990	Borac Banja Luka	H	D	0–0			

== Europe ==
Round	Date	Opponents	Venue	Result	Score F–A	Scorers	Attendance	Ref
R1 (1st leg)	19 September 1990	(Italy) Atalanta	A	D	0–0		29,033	
R1 (2nd leg)	3 October 1990	(Italy) Atalanta	H	D	1–1	Boban 54'	19,488	

== Players ==
Dinamo used a total of 28 players during the 1990–91 season, and there were 15 different goalscorers for the club. The club played 41 competitive matches this season (36 in the league, 3 in the national cup, and 2 in the UEFA Cup). Five players were named in the starting lineup 30 or more times.

The leading player in appearances was goalkeeper Dražen Ladić, who started 35 out of 36 league matches. The leading goalscorers in the league were Davor Šuker (22) and Zvonimir Boban (16), who finished second and third in the 1990–91 season goalscoring table, behind only Crvena Zvezda's Darko Pančev (34) who also won the European Golden Shoe for that season.

Boban scored the club's only hat-trick of the season, in a 8–1 thrashing of FK Sarajevo at Maksimir, in April 1991. Šuker had six braces in the league, with Kujtim Shala scoring two braces, and Boban one.

Dinamo was the second-highest goalscoring team in the league in 1990–91, producing 88 goals in 36 matches (2.44 per game) and had shared third-best defense, conceding 36 goals, including 10 clean sheets.

A feature of the Yugoslav league in this period were penalty shoot-outs, played in case of tied results at the end of regular time, with only the winning team earning a point. The rule was introduced to encourage attacking football and combat allegations of match-fixing. In the 1990–91 season Dinamo had ten draws in the league, and went on to win six of these shoot-outs.

In 1990–91 Dinamo were undefeated at Maksimir across all competitions, recording 13 wins and 4 draws in 17 league matches at home, winning 29 points (26 for straight wins plus 3 penalty kick wins) out of the maximum 34 (85.3%). In the cup, Dinamo played five matches, one of them at home, a 0–0 draw vs. Borac Banja Luka in the second leg of the quarter-finals in November 1990.

This does not include two "home" matches which FSJ ordered to be played outside of Zagreb due to the pitch invasion and violent rioting in the abandoned home game vs Red Star at the end of the previous season, in May 1990. Dinamo played these two matches at Stadion Kantrida in Rijeka in August: the 2–1 league win against Velež on 12 August, and the 1–0 win against Sarajevo in the Marshal Tito Cup three days later.

In Europe Dinamo held Italy's Atalanta to a 1–1 draw at Maksimir in the UEFA Cup, only getting knocked out due to the away goals rule.

Boban scored the club's only European goal of the season, against Italian club Atalanta in the return leg of the first round of the UEFA Cup at Maksimir in October 1990. At the end of the season Boban was transferred to Milan, where he would spend the following decade, while Šuker was sold to Sevilla in Spain, where he would soon become one of the league's top scorers of the early 1990s.

Before the season, Dinamo's Šuker and Panadić had been part of the Yugoslavia squad under national manager Ivica Osim at the 1990 FIFA World Cup played in Italy in July 1990. Just before that summer's tournament, Yugoslavia played a friendly at Dinamo's Stadion Maksimir in June 1990, in a controversial match which proved to be the last game played by Yugoslavia in Zagreb or anywhere else in Croatia.

Nevertheless, during the 1990–91 season the following Dinamo players earned full international caps for Yugoslavia: Petrović (1) Boban (4), Ladić (2), Šuker (2). The last Yugoslavia match to feature players from Croatian clubs was a Euro 1992 qualifier against Faroe Islands, played in Belgrade in May 1991. Petrović, who also left for Sevilla along with Šuker at the end of season, later earned 16 caps for FR Yugoslavia (later renamed "Serbia and Montenegro"), while Ladić, Boban and Šuker went on to become stalwarts in the star-studded Croatia national football team which reached the quarter-final at the UEFA Euro 1996 in England and the semi-final at the 1998 FIFA World Cup in France.

=== Squad statistics ===
Key

Pos = Playing position

Nat. = Nationality

DoB (Age) = Date of birth (age)

Apps = Appearances

GK = Goalkeeper

DF = Defender

MF = Midfielder

FW = Forward

Numbers indicate starting appearances + appearances as substitute.
Goals column shows total goals, numbers in brackets indicate penalties scored in regular time, excluding penalty shoot-outs in case of ties.
Players with name struck through and marked † left the club during the playing season.
Age as of 6 August 1990, first matchday of the season.

Pos.	Nat.	Name	DoB (Age)	League		Cup		Europe		Total	
Pos.	Nat.	Name	DoB (Age)	Apps	Goals	Apps	Goals	Apps	Goals	Apps	Goals
GK	(Socialist Federal Republic of Yugoslavia)	Dražen Ladić	1 January 1963 (aged 27)	35	0		0	2	0	42	0
DF	(Socialist Federal Republic of Yugoslavia)	Željko Petrović	13 November 1965 (aged 24)	32	2		0	2	0	39	2
FW	(Socialist Federal Republic of Yugoslavia)	Davor Šuker	1 January 1968 (aged 22)	32	22 (5)		3	2	0	39	25
MF	(Socialist Federal Republic of Yugoslavia)	Mladen Mladenović	13 September 1964 (aged 25)	28	6		3	2	0	32	9
DF	(Socialist Federal Republic of Yugoslavia)	Saša Peršon	28 February 1965 (aged 25)	28	0		0	2	0	33	0
MF	(Socialist Federal Republic of Yugoslavia)	Zvonimir Boban	8 October 1968 (aged 21)	26	16		0	2	1	30	17
DF	(Socialist Federal Republic of Yugoslavia)	Gregor Židan	5 October 1965 (aged 24)	26+2	2		1	2	0	35	3
DF	(Socialist Federal Republic of Yugoslavia)	Slavko Ištvanić	12 July 1966 (aged 24)	25+5	0		0	0+1	0	35	0
FW	(Socialist Federal Republic of Yugoslavia)	Kujtim Shala	13 July 1964 (aged 26)	24	8		3	2	0	29	11
MF	(Socialist Federal Republic of Yugoslavia)	Željko Adžić	28 August 1965 (aged 24)	19+4	4			0	0	24	3
DF	(Socialist Federal Republic of Yugoslavia)	Muhamed Preljević	16 June 1964 (aged 26)	19+2	1	0	0	0	0	21	1
DF	(Socialist Federal Republic of Yugoslavia)	Andrej Panadić	9 March 1969 (aged 21)	18	0		0	2	0	23	0
FW	(Socialist Federal Republic of Yugoslavia)	Josip Gašpar	15 March 1973 (aged 17)	13+2	1	0	0	0	0	15	2
MF	(Socialist Federal Republic of Yugoslavia)	Vjekoslav Škrinjar	2 June 1969 (aged 21)	11+10	1		1	0	0	25	2
FW	(Costa Rica)	Hernán Medford	23 May 1968 (aged 22)	10+4	3		0	0+2	0	19	3
DF	(Socialist Federal Republic of Yugoslavia)	Zvonko Lipovac	9 October 1964 (aged 25)	10	0		0	1	0	14	0
MF	(Socialist Federal Republic of Yugoslavia)	Damir Lesjak	31 March 1967 (aged 23)	8+3	0		0	1	0	15	0
MF	(Socialist Federal Republic of Yugoslavia)	Draženko Prskalo	18 April 1964 (aged 26)	7+9	1		0	1	0	19	1
DF	(Socialist Federal Republic of Yugoslavia)	Željko Cupan	30 December 1963 (aged 26)	7+1	1		0	0	0	9	1
MF	(Socialist Federal Republic of Yugoslavia)	Dražen Besek	10 March 1963 (aged 27)	6+2	0		1	0	0	11	1
DF	(Costa Rica)	Rónald González	8 August 1970 (aged 19)	4+1	0	0	0	1+1	0	7	0
FW	(Socialist Federal Republic of Yugoslavia)	Stjepan Deverić	20 August 1961 (aged 28)	3+4	2		0	0	0	7	2
MF	(Socialist Federal Republic of Yugoslavia)	Alen Peternac	16 January 1972 (aged 18)	2+5	0		1	0	0	11	1
FW	(Socialist Federal Republic of Yugoslavia)	Primož Gliha	8 October 1967 (aged 22)	1+1	2		0	0	0	2	2
GK	(Socialist Federal Republic of Yugoslavia)	Miralem Ibrahimović	19 January 1963 (aged 27)	1	0		0	0	0	1	0
DF	(Socialist Federal Republic of Yugoslavia)	Zoran Mamić	30 September 1971 (aged 18)	1	0		0	0	0	2	0
FW	(Socialist Federal Republic of Yugoslavia)	Miljenko Kovačić	19 March 1973 (aged 17)	0+6	0		0	0	0	6	0
FW	(Socialist Federal Republic of Yugoslavia)	Dževad Turković	17 June 1972 (aged 18)	0+4	0		0	0	0	5	0
MF	(Canada)	Nick Dasovic	5 December 1968 (aged 21)	0	0		0	0	0	1	0

== See also ==
- 1990–91 Yugoslav First League
- 1990–91 Yugoslav Cup
