= Bezirksliga Main =

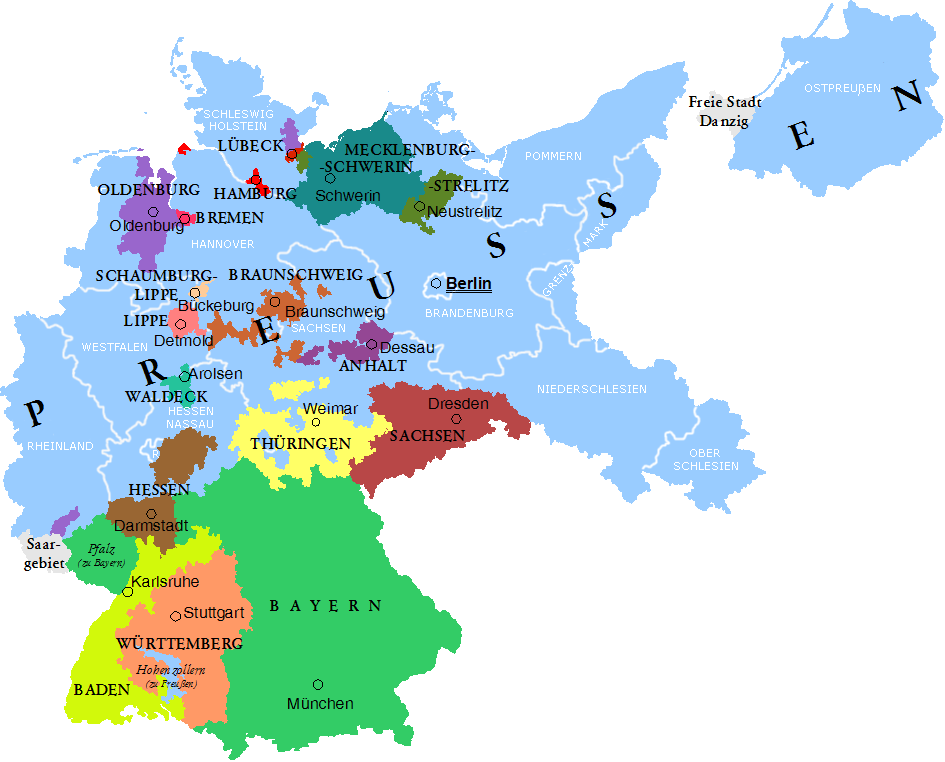
- Founded: 1923
- Folded: 1927
- Replaced by: Bezirksliga Main-Hessen
- Country: Germany
- State: Hesse-Nassau; People's State of Hesse
- Level on pyramid: Level 1
- Last champions: FSV Frankfurt (1926–27)

The Bezirksliga Main-Hessen was the highest association football league in the German state of Hesse and the Prussian province of Hesse-Nassau from 1923 to 1927, when the league was replaced by the Bezirksliga Main-Hessen.

== Overview ==
The league was formed in 1923, after a league reform which was decided upon in Darmstadt, Hesse. It replaced the Kreisliga Nordmain and the Kreisliga Südmain as the highest leagues in the region. Apart from clubs from Hesse, with the Viktoria Aschaffenburg, the league also included one club from Bavaria.

The Bezirksliga Main, named after the river Main, started out with eight teams, playing each other in a home-and-away round with the league winner advancing to the Southern German championship, which in turn was a qualification tournament for the German championship.

The league modus remained unchanged for its first three seasons, 1923–24, 1924–25 and 1925–26. For its last edition however, it expanded to ten clubs. Additionally, the leagues runners-up also qualified for a "consolidation" round with the other runners-up of the southern Bezirksligas. The winner of this round was awarded the third entry spot for the south to the German finals.

In an attempt to bring all Southern German leagues to a similar system, the Bezirksligas were reorganised in 1927. For the Bezirksliga Main, this meant, it joined with the northern clubs of the Bezirksliga Rheinhessen-Saar to form the new Bezirksliga Main-Hessen. In practice, this meant little change for the league as the new Bezirksliga was immediately sub-divided into two independent, regional divisions. Out of the ten clubs in the league, nine went to the new Bezirksliga Main-Hessen - Main division, only the VfL Neu-Isenburg found itself grouped into the Hessen division of the new league.

== National success ==
=== Southern German championship ===
Qualified teams and their success:

- 1924:
  - FSV Frankfurt, 5th place
- 1925:
  - FSV Frankfurt, 3rd place
- 1926:
  - FSV Frankfurt, 3rd place
- 1927:
  - Eintracht Frankfurt, 3rd place Bezirksliga-runners-up round
  - FSV Frankfurt, 3rd place

=== German championship ===
Qualified teams and their success:

- 1924:
  - none qualified
- 1925:
  - FSV Frankfurt, Final
- 1926:
  - FSV Frankfurt, Quarter final
- 1927:
  - none qualified

== Founding members of the league ==
The league was formed from eight teams:

- FSV Frankfurt
- Eintracht Frankfurt
- FC Hanau 93
- Helvetia Frankfurt
- Kickers Offenbach
- SC Bürgel
- Viktoria Aschaffenburg
- SpVgg Offenbach

== Winners and runners-up of the Bezirksliga Main ==
Season	Champions	Runners-Up
1923–24	FSV Frankfurt	Eintracht Frankfurt
1924–25	FSV Frankfurt	Kickers Offenbach
1925–26	FSV Frankfurt	FC Hanau 93
1926–27	FSV Frankfurt	Eintracht Frankfurt

== Placings in the Bezirksliga Main 1923 to 1927 ==
Club	1924	1925	1926	1927
FSV Frankfurt	1	1	1	1
Eintracht Frankfurt	2	5	4	2
FC Hanau 93	3	4	2	6
Helvetia Frankfurt	4	3	8	
Kickers Offenbach	5	2	3	3
SC Bürgel	6	8		
Viktoria Aschaffenburg	7		7	9
SpVgg Offenbach	8			
Union Niederrad		6	5	8
VfR Frankfurt		7		
Germania 94 Frankfurt			6	7
Rot-Weiß Frankfurt				4
VfL Neu-Isenburg				5
Viktoria Hanau				10

Source:"Bezirksliga Main". Das deutsche Fussball-Archiv.

- The Helvetia Frankfurt and VfR Frankfurt merged in 1926 to form Rot-Weiß Frankfurt.
