= Alex Elliott =

Canadian soccer player

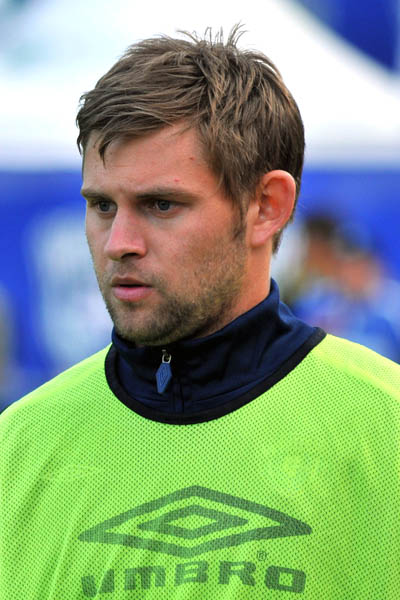

Personal information
- Full name: Alexander Elliott
- Date of birth: April 24, 1987 (age 39)
- Place of birth: Vancouver, British Columbia, Canada
- Height: 5 ft 9 in (1.75 m)
- Positions: Midfielder; forward

Youth career
- 2005–2007: Portland Pilots

Senior career*
Years	Team	Apps	(Gls)
2008	Sportfreunde Siegen	9	(1)
2008–2010	Mainz 05	1	(0)
2008–2010	→ Mainz 05 II (loan)	33	(4)
2010	Vancouver Whitecaps	14	(1)
2011–2012	Sportfreunde Siegen	43	(9)

International career^{‡}
2003	Canada U17	7	(2)
2005–2007	Canada U20	16	(4)
2012	Canada national futsal	7	(4)

Managerial career
- 2014–2017: Quest University Mens Soccer
- 2017–: U15 Whitecaps FC (assistant)
- 2018–: Capilano University Mens Soccer
- * Club domestic league appearances and goals as of 15 August 2011 ‡ National team caps and goals as of 15 August 2011

Alexander Elliott (born April 24, 1987) is a Canadian former soccer player. Elliott retired from playing in 2012 and entered the coaching world of soccer. Elliott is a UEFA A Licensed Coach.

== Career ==
=== Youth ===
Born in Vancouver, British Columbia, Elliott attended Summerland Secondary School and Magee Secondary School in Vancouver, and played for Columbus FC of the Vancouver Men's league (VMSL) in 2004 Elliott earned the league's golden boot with 12 goals in 16 matches at the age of 16. In 2006 Elliott played in the Pacific Coast Soccer League for Whitecaps FC Reserves with whom he won the championship. Elliott then went on to play three years of college NCAA soccer at the University of Portland. He was named to the WCC All-Freshman Team and started all 19 matches in his first season with the Pilots in 2005, earned All-West Coast Conference Team honours as a sophomore in 2006, and went on to earn All-West Coast Conference First Team honours in 2007, adding WCC points, assist, and game-winning goals leader. Elliott Finished a 3-year NCAA Career with 21 goals and 10 Assists, a point per game average over 52 matches. Elliott occasionally captioned the U15, U17 and U20 Team Canada squads throughout his youth.

=== Professional ===
Elliott opted out of the MLS draft and turned professional in 2008 when he signed with Sportfreunde Siegen of the German Bundesliga 3, making seven appearances, With 3 assists. At the summer break of 2008, Elliott was sold to FSV Mainz 05 of the German Bundesliga 1. He played extensively for Mainz's reserves, making 23 appearances and scoring two goals while adding 6 assists.

Elliott returned to Canada in the summer of 2010 when he joined the Vancouver Whitecaps Appearing in 14 of the final 16 matches in the 2010 season.

Elliott then returned to the German Bundesliga to play for former club SportFreunde Siegen Sportfreunde Siegen from 2010 to 2012 scoring 7 goals in 34 matches. Elliott retired from playing in 2012.

=== International ===
Elliott has represented Canada at U-15, U-17, U-20 and Men's futsal team levels. He scored two goals in eight matches with the U-17 squad and was a member of the U-17 group that competed in the 2003 CONCACAF Qualifying Tournament. Later he was a member of the U-20 squad that competed in the 2007 FIFA U-20 World Cup, Scoring 13 goals in 27 Friendly matches over his two years with the U-20 team, Acting as team Co-Capitan. In 2008 Elliott was not released by SF Siegen to join the U23 Canadian Team at Olympic Qualifying. In 2012 Elliott joined the Canadian national futsal team at the 2012 CONCACAF futsal world cup qualifiers in Guatemala. Elliott was the team's top goalscorer with 4 goals in the CONCACAF futsal world cup qualifiers. Elliott retired from playing directly after the tournament.

=== Business ===
Elliot is the founding director and current president of Toca Canada, a business that develops youth soccer players with high level coaching, data collection and quick-response technology. It is a growing brand that helps develop the game in North America and Europe.

== External links playing career ==
- Act-Sports Groups: Alex Elliott
- Elliott's Caps debut will be a friends family affair
- Alex Elliott at fussballdaten.de (in German)
- DFB Alex Elliott
- Mainz05 Interview With Alex Elliott
- Vancouver Whitecaps bio
- Footballread Alex Elliott 2007 highlights
- Alex Elliott BC Head of the class 2005
- Alex Elliott 2003-2004 VMSL Golden Boot winner
- 2007 University of Portland Soccer Stats
- All-Time university of Portland Men's Soccer Stats
- Alex Elliott at WorldFootball.net
- Alex Elliott at Canada Soccer

== External links coaching career ==
- Alex Elliott named head coach of CapU Blues men's soccer
- Family, Trust, Responsibility, Faith, and Pride
- Kermodes head to gold medal match
- Meet Coach Elliott
- Quest Men's Soccer Makes History
- Kermodes find silver lining in PACWEST champs
- Turnaround Season Ends With A Medal
- Elliott Named Quest University Head Coach
- Quest Men Snap Streak
- Quest Kermodes ready for provincial debut
- Quest Kermodes capture first ever men's soccer medal
- Fusion FC Staff
- The 2016-17 Quest Men's Soccer team ended their season on a high note
- Elliott is optimistic about many of the recent developments at Quest.
