= Mladen Mladenović =

Croatian footballer and manager

Personal information
- Date of birth: 13 September 1964 (age 62)
- Place of birth: Rijeka, SR Croatia, SFR Yugoslavia
- Height: 1.78 m (5 ft 10 in)
- Position: Midfielder

Youth career
- Lučki Radnik
- –1982: Rijeka

Senior career*
Years	Team	Apps	(Gls)
1982–1989	Rijeka	116	(21)
1985	→ Zadar (loan)	16	(6)
1989–1991	Dinamo Zagreb	58	(16)
1991–1993	Castellón	66	(20)
1993–1994	Rijeka	31	(20)
1994–1995	Casino Salzburg	46	(15)
1996–1997	Gamba Osaka	20	(11)
1997	Rijeka	9	(2)
1998	Hajduk Split	12	(4)
Total		374	(115)

International career
1990–1996	Croatia	19	(3)

Managerial career
- 2002: NK Žminj
- 2002–2003: Rijeka
- Halubjan Viškovo
- Cres
- 2006–2008: Orijent
- * Club domestic league appearances and goals

Mladen Mladenović (born 13 September 1964) is a Croatian professional football manager and retired player who played as a midfielder.

== Playing career ==
=== Club ===
During his career he played for Rijeka, Zadar, Dinamo Zagreb and Hajduk Split in Croatia, CD Castellón in Spain, SV Austria Salzburg in Austria, and with Gamba Osaka in Japanese J.League. Known for his explosive shooting, Mladenović scored a total of 115 goals in 374 league games. When at Rijeka, he severely injured Hajduk's debutant player Nenad Gračan in 1986, breaking Gračan's leg.

=== International ===
He made his debut for Croatia in an October 1990 friendly match against the United States, coming on as a 58th-minute substitute for Aljoša Asanović, and earned a total of 19 caps, scoring 3 goals. Since Croatia was still part of Yugoslavia at the time, his first 3 games are unofficial. Mladenović participated at UEFA Euro 1996 and his final international was at that tournament in the quarter finals against eventual winners Germany.

== Managerial career ==
Following his retirement from playing professional football, Mladenović started a career as a referee, as well as a manager. Since 2002, he managed NK Žminj, Rijeka, NK Halubjan, NK Cres and Orijent.

== Club statistics ==
Season	Club	League	League		Cup		Continental		Total	
Season	Club	League	Apps	Goals	Apps	Goals	Apps	Goals	Apps	Goals
1982	Rijeka	Yugoslav First League	2	0	0	0	–		2	0
1982–83	Rijeka	Yugoslav First League	7	0	0	0	–		7	0
1984–85	Rijeka	Yugoslav First League	9	0	0	0	–		9	0
1985	Zadar (loan)	Yugoslav Second League	16	6	–		–		16	6
1985–86	Rijeka	Yugoslav First League	11	2	0	0	–		11	2
1986–87	Rijeka	Yugoslav First League	24	1	5	0	1	0	30	1
1987–88	Rijeka	Yugoslav First League	30	5	1	0	–		31	5
1988–89	Rijeka	Yugoslav First League	33	13	1	0	–		34	13
1989–90	Dinamo Zagreb	Yugoslav First League	30	10	2	1	1	0	33	11
1990–91	Dinamo Zagreb	Yugoslav First League	28	6	2	3	2	0	32	9
1991–92	Castellón	Segunda División	36	12	4	1	–		40	13
1992–93	Castellón	Segunda División	30	8	–		–		30	8
1993–94	Rijeka	Croatian First Division	31	20	9	3	–		40	23
1994–95	Austria Salzburg	Austrian Bundesliga	31	8	1	1	8	3	40	12
1995	Austria Salzburg	Austrian Bundesliga	15	7	1	0	2	0	18	7
1996	Gamba Osaka	J1 League	20	11	3	1	–		23	12
1997	Gamba Osaka	J1 League	0	0	0	0	–		0	0
1997	Rijeka	Croatian First Division	9	2	2	1	–		11	3
1998	Hajduk Split	Croatian First Division	12	4	2	1	–		14	5
Yugoslavia total			190	43	11	4	4	0	205	54
Spain total			66	20	4	1	0	0	70	21
Austria total			46	15	2	1	10	3	58	19
Japan total			20	11	3	1	0	0	23	12
Croatia total			52	26	13	5	0	0	65	31
Career total			374	115	33	12	14	3	421	130

== National team statistics ==
Croatia national team
Year	Apps	Goals
1990	2	0
1991	1	0
1992	0	0
1993	1	0
1994	6	2
1995	5	1
1996	4	0
Total	19	3

== International goals ==
Goal	Date	Venue	Opponent	Score	Result	Competition
1–2	18 May 1994	ETO, Győr	Hungary	1 – 1	2 – 2	Friendly
1–2	18 May 1994	ETO, Győr	Hungary	2 – 1	2 – 2	Friendly
3	3 September 1995	Maksimir, Zagreb	Estonia	1 – 0	7 – 1	Euro 1996 Qualifying

== Managerial statistics ==
Team	From	To	Record				
Team	From	To	G	W	D	L	Win %
HNK Rijeka	November 2002	March 2003	9	1	3	5	11.11

== Honours ==
Rijeka

- Yugoslav Youth Cup: 1982

Salzburg

- Austrian Bundesliga: 1994–95
- Austrian Supercup: 1994, 1995

Individual

- SN Yellow Shirt Award: 1994
- HNK Rijeka all time XI by Novi list
