= Davor Šuker =

Croatian footballer (born 1968)

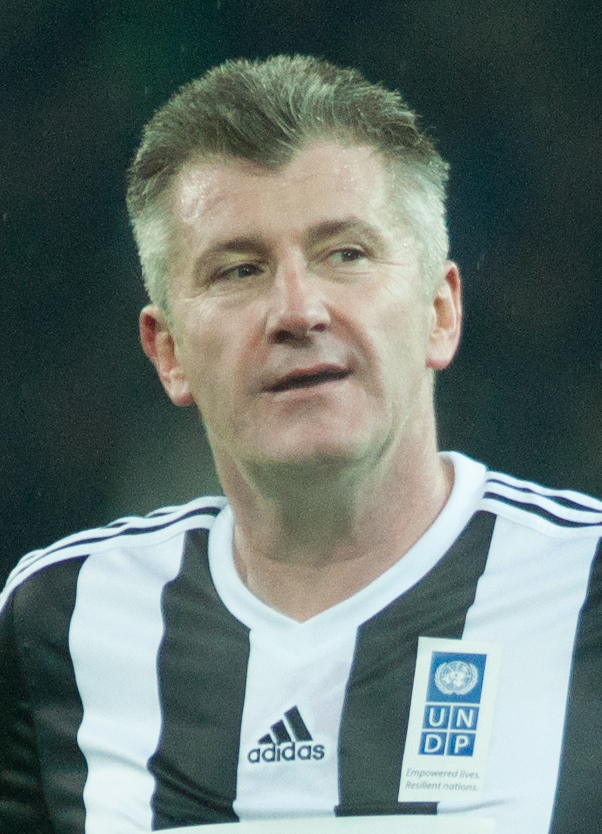
- Šuker in a 2014 charity match

President of the Croatian Football Federation
- In office 5 July 2012 – 29 July 2021
- Preceded by: Vlatko Marković
- Succeeded by: Marijan Kustić

Personal details
- Born: 1 January 1968 (age 58) Osijek, SR Croatia, SFR Yugoslavia
- Height: 1.83 m (6 ft 0 in)
- Parent: Tomislav Šuker (father)
- Occupation: Footballer; Football administrator
Association football career
- Position: Striker
Youth career
- 1984: Osijek
Senior career*
| Years | Team | Apps | (Gls) |
| 1984–1989 | Osijek | 91 | (40) |
| 1989–1991 | Dinamo Zagreb | 60 | (34) |
| 1991–1996 | Sevilla | 153 | (76) |
| 1996–1999 | Real Madrid | 86 | (38) |
| 1999–2000 | Arsenal | 22 | (8) |
| 2000–2001 | West Ham United | 11 | (2) |
| 2001–2003 | 1860 Munich | 25 | (5) |
| Total | | 448 | (203) |
International career
| 1987 | Yugoslavia U20 | 6 | (6) |
| 1988–1990 | Yugoslavia U21 | 10 | (7) |
| 1988 | Yugoslavia U23 | 2 | (0) |
| 1990–1991 | Yugoslavia | 2 | (1) |
| 1992–2002 | Croatia | 68 (Note: Does not include the match for Croatia against Romania B on 22 December 1990 as it was not a full 'A' international therefore is not recognised as official by FIFA. He did not score in the match.) | (45) |
Medal record
Men's football
Representing Yugoslavia
FIFA U-20 World Cup
| Winner | 1987 |
UEFA European Under-21 Championship
| Runner-up | 1990 |
Representing Croatia
FIFA World Cup
| Third place | 1998 |
- * Club domestic league appearances and goals

Davor Šuker (Croatian pronunciation: [dâʋoːr ʃǔker]; born 1 January 1968) is a Croatian football administrator and former professional player who played as a striker. He served as the president of the Croatian Football Federation (HNS) from 2012 to 2021. Šuker is generally regarded as the greatest Croatian striker of all time with a record 45 goals in 68 matches. He has been Croatia's all-time top scorer since 1998. Under his leadership of the Croatian Football Federation, Croatia reached runner-up at the 2018 FIFA World Cup, the nation's highest international achievement.

Šuker began his footballing career in his hometown for local first division team NK Osijek at 16-year-old, later departing as the league's top goal scorer. He moved to Dinamo Zagreb in 1989 but the Croatian War of Independence eventually redirected Šuker to Spanish club Sevilla in 1991. In La Liga, Šuker was consecutively amongst the division's top goal scorers. He signed with Real Madrid five years later, again amongst the league's top scorers. While at the Santiago Bernabéu, he helped Madrid claim the Liga and UEFA Champions League titles. A move to Arsenal saw him support their run to the UEFA Cup final of 2000. He then had a spell with West Ham United, then closed his career playing for German side 1860 Munich.

Following his debut for the Croatia national football team in 1990, he led the team to third-place at the 1998 FIFA World Cup, securing the nation's first bronze medal. He won the Golden Boot by scoring six goals in seven matches. He won the Silver Ball as the second-best player of the tournament, behind Ronaldo. Šuker was later named as Croatia's Golden Player at the UEFA Jubilee Awards in 2003 and finished third in the 1998 FIFA World Player of the Year award as well as second for the 1998 Ballon d'Or. He is the only Croatian included on the FIFA 100 list created by Pelé in 2004. He won Croatian Footballer of the Year a then-record six times in 1992 and from 1994 to 1998.

== Club career ==
=== Early career ===
Šuker was born in Osijek to a Bosnian Croat family from Livno. He began playing football in his home town with the club NK Osijek in 1984. In 1989, he moved to Dinamo Zagreb, where during the following two seasons he scored 34 goals in 60 Yugoslav First League matches. Šuker made such an impression that he received his first call-up to the Yugoslavia national team. His play also attracted several clubs, including Spanish club Sevilla, which he joined in 1991.

=== Sevilla ===
Šuker made his Primera División debut for Sevilla on 17 November 1991, coming off the substitutes' bench as a last-minute substitute in Sevilla's 1–1 away draw at Espanyol. In the following match, at home against Real Sociedad, he made his first start and went on to score two goals in a 2–2 draw. He finished his first season at the club with 6 goals in 22 appearances. During Sevilla's first match of the next season away at Albacete, Šuker scored his first Primera hat-trick, which led a 4–3 victory. He improved his tally from the prior season with 13 goals in 33 matches.

In the 1993–94 season, Šuker was the second-highest scorer in the league with 24 goals to Barcelona's Romário. He made a total of 34 Primera appearances that season and also scored five braces and one hat-trick. Šuker played with Argentine legend Diego Maradona at the club within the 1992–93 season. During this and the next season with Sevilla, he scored a total of 33 goals in 64 appearances in the Spanish Primera.

=== Real Madrid ===
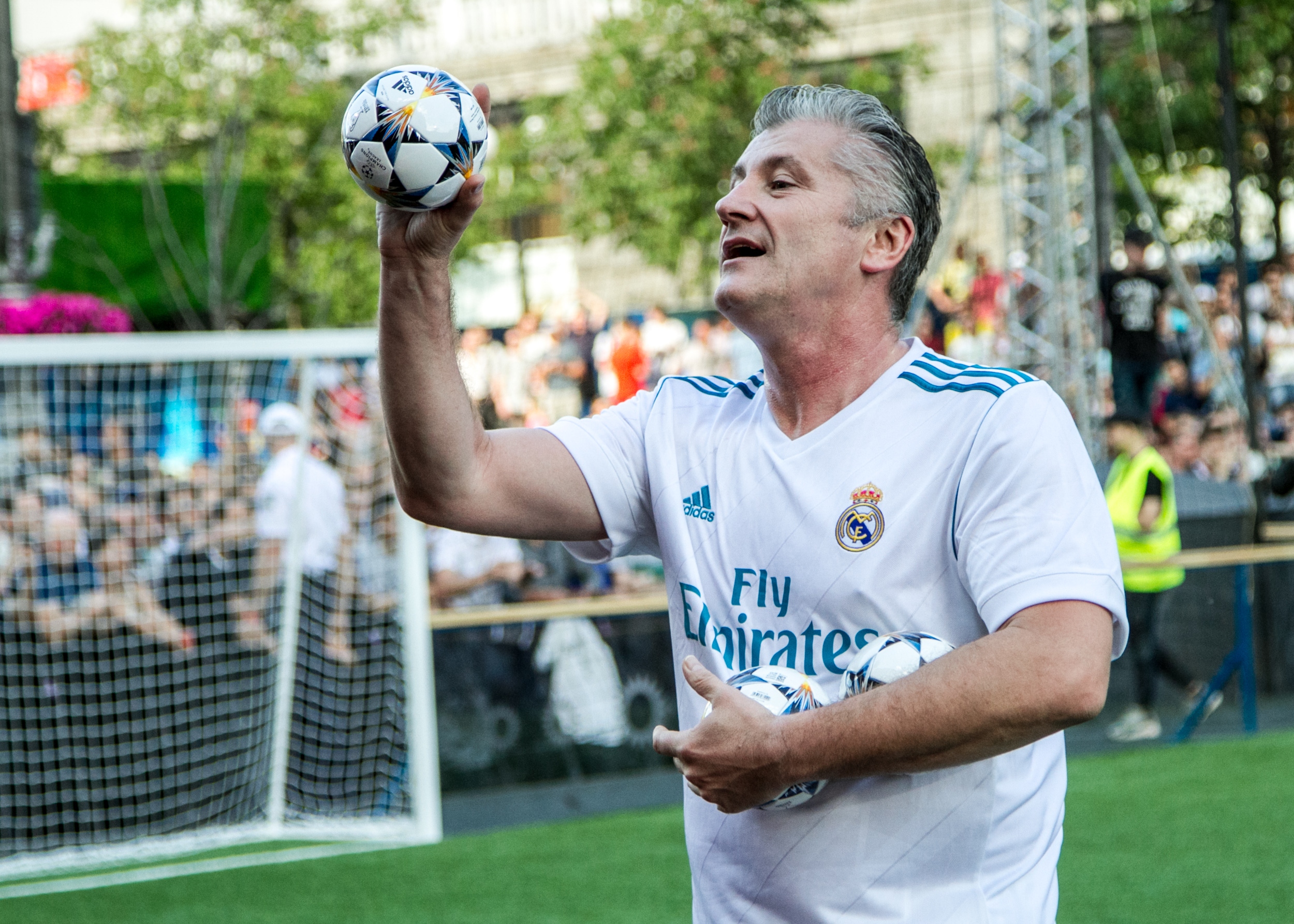
Šuker during a Real Madrid youth academy event in 2018

Šuker went on to move to Real Madrid. This transfer came prior to the start of the 1996–97 season. With Los Galacticos, his goalscoring potency continued as he scored 24 goals in 38 appearances. Šuker ended up as the third-best scorer within the league, behind Barcelona's Ronaldo and Real Betis's Alfonso. During that season, he scored three hat-tricks in the Primera seeing Madrid to lift the league title. Along with Raúl and Predrag Mijatović, he formed an effective offensive line for the club.

Šuker was again successful with Real Madrid in the following season, which won the 1997–98 UEFA Champions League. In the Primera, Šuker scored 10 goals in 29 appearances. Within the 1998–99 season, his presence at Real Madrid was reduced despite the fact he performed well at that summer's World Cup. This was seen as he made only 19 Primera appearances, scoring 4 goals as a whole. By that season's end, he opted to leave the club. His decision to leave also marked the close of his eight-season-long spell in the Spanish Primera, where he scored 114 goals in 239 total appearances.

=== Arsenal ===
Šuker joined FA Premier League club Arsenal for the 1999–2000 season. While in the Premier League, he was nicknamed by the British press "Sukerman", an allusion to comic book superhero Superman. He made his league debut on 22 August 1999 in a 2–1 defeat to Manchester United at Highbury, coming on as a substitute for the final 15 minutes. He played another two matches as a substitute before making his first start in Arsenal's 3–1 home victory over Aston Villa, where he scored a brace, his first two goals in the Premier League. With Arsenal, he played in the 2000 UEFA Cup Final as an extra-time substitute, Šuker missed his penalty as Arsenal lost to Turkish side Galatasaray on penalties.

Šuker also scored once in the League Cup against Middlesbrough and twice in the UEFA Champions League against AIK (once at home and once away). He scored 8 league goals (including 3 braces) in 22 Premiership appearances with Arsenal.

=== West Ham United ===
At West Ham United, Šuker never managed to find his place in the first team for a long period and only made 11 Premiership appearances for the club throughout the season, scoring twice against Manchester United and Sunderland. He also scored once in the League Cup against Blackburn Rovers. His career in England ended with the end of that season, where he joined German side 1860 Munich for the 2001–02 season.

=== 1860 Munich ===
At 1860 Munich, Šuker made his Bundesliga debut, playing all 90 minutes in the club's 1–0 home victory over Energie Cottbus on 1 December 2001. His first goal for 1860 came in their first match after the winter break, a headed effort which completed a 3–0 home victory over 1. FC Köln. His highlight of the season came during the final league match in a 4–2 away victory over Borussia Mönchengladbach, where he scored a brace. He finished his first season in the Bundesliga with 4 goals in 14 appearances.

In the 2002–03 season, Šuker scored in 1860 Munich's 3–1 home victory over Arminia Bielefeld on 2 November 2002. While playing with 1860 in the Bundesliga, he scored 5 goals in 25 appearances. He made five appearances in the DFB-Pokal, scoring three goals.

== International career ==
Šuker's eye for goals was duly illustrated in his feats at youth level. He finished as the second highest scorer as he netted six goals at the 1987 World Youth Championships in Chile. The Yugoslavians also set a Championship record with 22 goals scored altogether. Yugoslavia went on to win the title with a generation of future talents. Some of these players went on to represent Croatia such as Robert Prosinečki, Zvonimir Boban and Igor Štimac.

Šuker played for Yugoslavia in the 1988 Seoul Summer Olympic games. Those appearances came in group stage matches against Brazil and Nigeria. In two years time, he featured in the UEFA Under-21 Championship. He scored four goals in five matches as Yugoslavia won their group stage. Šuker also struck the only goal in the second leg of his side's 3–0 quarter-final victory on aggregate against Bulgaria. He scored once again against Italy. In the final against Soviet Union he scored one goal in the first leg. In all he tallied a sum of seven goals throughout the Championships winning the Golden Boot. Yugoslavia went on to finish as runners up with Šuker also being named as the Golden Player of the Tournament.

=== Senior team ===
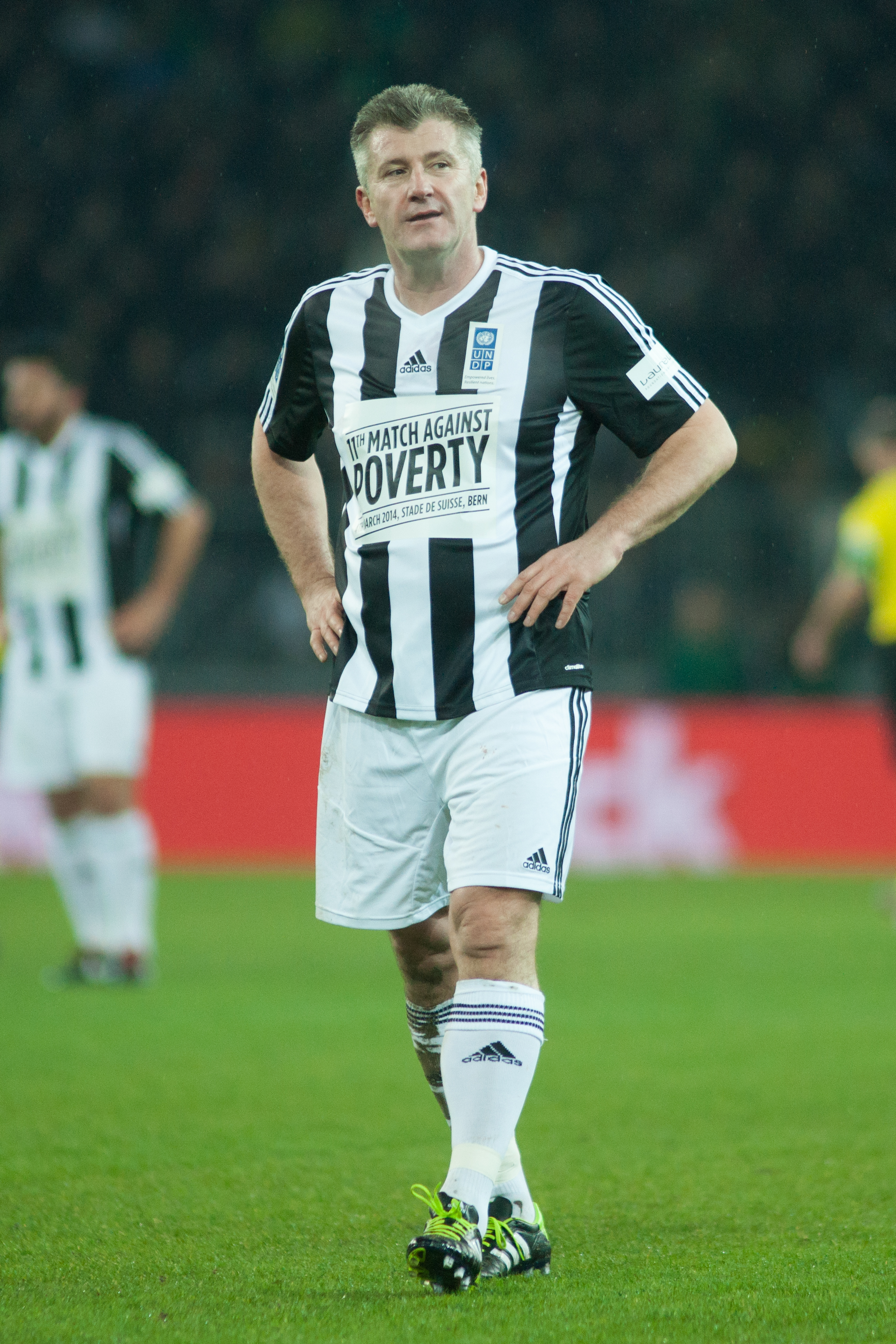
Šuker during a charity match against poverty in March 2014

After briefly playing for Yugoslavia in two matches in 1991, Šuker made his official debut for Croatia in 1992. In his first match against Mexico, he scored a brace in a 3–0 victory. He then led Croatia to their first major international tournament, UEFA Euro 1996, with a then-record 12 goals in 10 matches during the qualifying stages. During the Euro 1996 final stages in England, he scored three goals in four matches, including two in the 3–0 group stage win over defending champions Denmark. It was in this match he set up the final score with an unforgettable looping shot over Danish goalkeeper Peter Schmeichel, still remembered as one of the greatest goals in UEFA European Championship history. Šuker's feats during the tournament saw him named to the Team of the Tournament.

Šuker then went on to see Croatia qualify for their first FIFA World Cup after scoring five goals in nine matches during the qualifying stages for the 1998 finals in France. In the tournament proper, he scored six goals in seven matches, scoring in every match Croatia scored. These included goals in 1–0 victories over Japan in the group stage and Romania in the round of 16. In the quarter-finals against Germany, Šuker was fouled by Christian Wörns who received a straight red card. Šuker scored the final goal in a 3–0 victory. He also brought the team to the doorstep of the final by scoring the opener in the semi-final against France. Lilian Thuram took the match back for the hosts with his only two international goals to give France a 2–1 victory and a place in the final.

In the third-place play-off, Šuker scored the match-winner in a 2–1 victory against the Netherlands, leading Croatia to a sensational third-place finish in their first World Cup appearance since becoming an independent nation. Šuker won the Golden Boot as the tournament's top scorer, as well as the Silver Ball as the World Cup's second-best player, behind Ronaldo of Brazil.

After the 1998 World Cup, Šuker featured for Croatia in their unfruitful run to qualify for the Euro 2000. Šuker was though noted in endeavouring to keep Croatia's hopes alive when he scored a 94th-minute winner against the Republic of Ireland at Maksimir Stadium in Zagreb. The win ensured Croatia would have a strong chance of still qualifying for the tournament. The Croatians would miss out on such in their final qualifier, a 2–2 draw at home to Yugoslavia. Šuker did score a late disallowed goal which, if stood, would have assured Croatia's qualification. He finished with four goals in seven matches during the campaign.

Šuker was also part of the Croatian team at the 2002 World Cup finals in South Korea and Japan. However, he only played 63 minutes in the tournament, in a 1–0 defeat to Mexico in Croatia's opening match. After Croatia's elimination, Šuker announced his retirement from international football.

Šuker won a total of 70 international FIFA-recognised caps during his senior career, 2 for Yugoslavia and 68 for Croatia. The forward scored 46 international goals in total. With 45 goals, he is Croatia's all-time leading goal-scorer. His 12 goals during the campaign for Euro 1996 was a record that stood for over 10 years—Northern Ireland's David Healy broke his record in 2007 after scoring 13 goals during Euro 2008 qualifying.

== Post-retirement ==
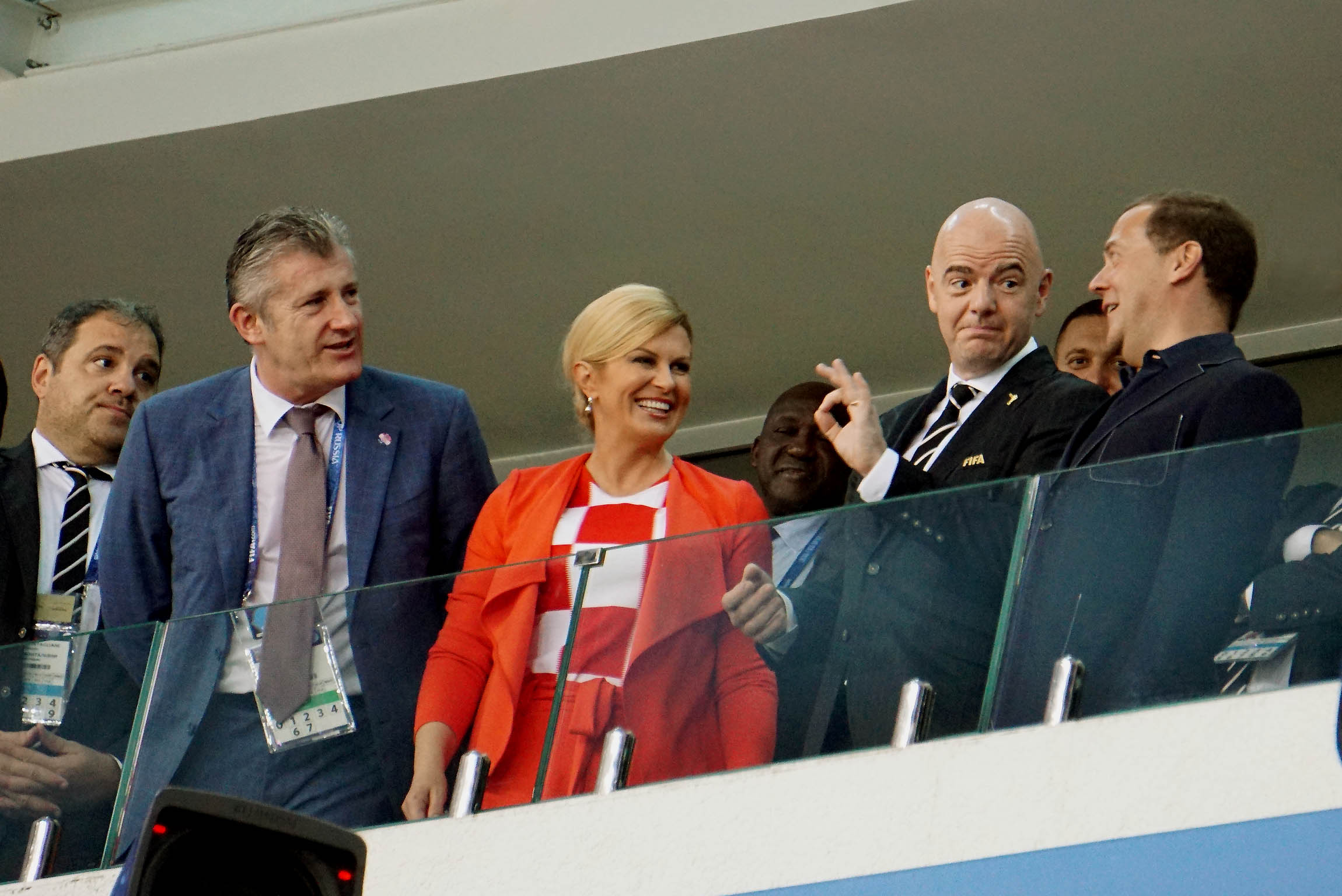
Šuker alongside Croatian president Kolinda Grabar-Kitarović and FIFA president Gianni Infantino, 2018

Šuker established his own school of football entitled the Davor Šuker Soccer Academy, with training camps located in Zagreb and several other Croatian cities.

In July 2012, the Croatian Football Federation (HNS) unanimously elected Šuker as president. In 2015, Croatian Journalists' Association (HND) accused Šuker of preventing freedom of information and for physically blocking journalists from reporting on HNS matters. Under his leadership of the federation, Croatia reached runner-up at the 2018 FIFA World Cup, the nation's highest international achievement. Šuker departed the HNS in 2021, succeeded by Marijan Kustić.

== Career statistics ==
=== Club ===
Appearances and goals by club, season and competition
| Club | Season | League | | | National cup | | League cup | | Continental | | Other | | Total | |
| Club | Season | Division | Apps | Goals | Apps | Goals | Apps | Goals | Apps | Goals | Apps | Goals | Apps | Goals |
|---|---|---|---|---|---|---|---|---|---|---|---|---|---|---|
| Osijek | 1985–86 | Yugoslav First League | 10 | 3 | — | | — | | — | | — | | 10 | 3 |
| Osijek | 1986–87 | Yugoslav First League | 26 | 9 | — | | — | | — | | — | | 26 | 9 |
| Osijek | 1987–88 | Yugoslav First League | 29 | 10 | — | | — | | — | | — | | 29 | 10 |
| Osijek | 1988–89 | Yugoslav First League | 26 | 18 | — | | — | | — | | — | | 26 | 18 |
| Osijek | Total | | 91 | 40 | — | | — | | — | | — | | 91 | 40 |
| Dinamo Zagreb | 1989–90 | Yugoslav First League | 28 | 12 | 3 | 4 | — | | 2 | 1 | — | | 33 | 17 |
| Dinamo Zagreb | 1990–91 | Yugoslav First League | 32 | 22 | — | | — | | 2 | 0 | — | | 34 | 22 |
| Dinamo Zagreb | 1991–92 | Yugoslav First League | — | | — | | — | | 1 | 0 | — | | 1 | 0 |
| Dinamo Zagreb | Total | | 60 | 34 | 3 | 4 | — | | 5 | 1 | — | | 68 | 39 |
| Sevilla | 1991–92 | La Liga | 22 | 6 | 4 | 3 | — | | — | | — | | 26 | 9 |
| Sevilla | 1992–93 | La Liga | 33 | 13 | 2 | 0 | — | | — | | — | | 35 | 13 |
| Sevilla | 1993–94 | La Liga | 34 | 24 | 7 | 3 | — | | — | | — | | 41 | 27 |
| Sevilla | 1994–95 | La Liga | 32 | 17 | 2 | 3 | — | | — | | — | | 34 | 20 |
| Sevilla | 1995–96 | La Liga | 32 | 16 | 3 | 1 | — | | 6 | 4 | — | | 41 | 21 |
| Sevilla | Total | | 153 | 76 | 18 | 10 | — | | 6 | 4 | — | | 177 | 90 |
| Real Madrid | 1996–97 | La Liga | 38 | 24 | 5 | 5 | — | | — | | — | | 43 | 29 |
| Real Madrid | 1997–98 | La Liga | 29 | 10 | 1 | 1 | — | | 7 | 4 | 2 | 0 | 39 | 15 |
| Real Madrid | 1998–99 | La Liga | 19 | 4 | 2 | 0 | — | | 6 | 1 | — | | 27 | 5 |
| Real Madrid | Total | | 86 | 38 | 8 | 6 | — | | 13 | 5 | 2 | 0 | 109 | 49 |
| Arsenal | 1999–2000 | Premier League | 22 | 8 | 3 | 0 | 1 | 1 | 13 | 2 | — | | 39 | 11 |
| West Ham United | 2000–01 | Premier League | 11 | 2 | 0 | 0 | 2 | 1 | — | | — | | 13 | 3 |
| 1860 Munich | 2001–02 | Bundesliga | 14 | 4 | 3 | 2 | — | | — | | — | | 17 | 6 |
| 1860 Munich | 2002–03 | Bundesliga | 11 | 1 | 2 | 1 | — | | — | | — | | 13 | 2 |
| 1860 Munich | Total | | 25 | 5 | 5 | 3 | — | | — | | — | | 30 | 8 |
| Career total | | | 448 | 203 | 37 | 23 | 3 | 2 | 37 | 12 | 2 | 0 | 527 | 240 |

=== International ===
Appearances and goals by national team and year
| National team | Year | Competitive | | Friendly | | Total | |
| National team | Year | Apps | Goals | Apps | Goals | Apps | Goals |
|---|---|---|---|---|---|---|---|
| Yugoslavia | 1991 | 1 (Note: Appearance(s) in UEFA European Championship qualification) | 1 | 1 | 0 | 2 | 1 |
| Croatia | 1992 | 0 | 0 | 1 | 2 | 1 | 2 |
| Croatia | 1993 | 0 | 0 | 1 | 1 | 1 | 1 |
| Croatia | 1994 | 3 | 4 | 2 | 1 | 5 | 5 |
| Croatia | 1995 | 7 | 8 | 0 | 0 | 7 | 8 |
| Croatia | 1996 | 6 (Note: Four appearances and 3 goals in UEFA European Championship, two appearances and one goal in FIFA World Cup qualification) | 4 | 4 | 2 | 10 | 6 |
| Croatia | 1997 | 7 (Note: Appearance(s) in FIFA World Cup qualification) | 4 | 0 | 0 | 7 | 4 |
| Croatia | 1998 | 9 (Note: Seven appearances and six goals in FIFA World Cup, two appearances and two goals in UEFA European Championship qualification) | 8 | 4 | 4 | 13 | 12 |
| Croatia | 1999 | 5 | 2 | 4 | 2 | 9 | 4 |
| Croatia | 2000 | 1 | 0 | 3 | 0 | 4 | 0 |
| Croatia | 2001 | 5 | 1 | 3 | 1 | 8 | 2 |
| Croatia | 2002 | 1 (Note: Appearance in FIFA World Cup) | 0 | 2 | 1 | 3 | 1 |
| Croatia | Total | 44 | 31 | 24 | 14 | 68 | 45 |
| Career total | | 45 | 32 | 25 | 14 | 70 | 46 |

== Honours ==
Real Madrid

- La Liga: 1996–97
- Supercopa de España: 1997
- UEFA Champions League: 1997–98
- Intercontinental Cup: 1998

Arsenal

- UEFA Cup runner-up: 1999–2000

Yugoslavia

- FIFA U-20 World Cup: 1987
- UEFA European Under-21 Championship runner-up: 1990

Croatia

- FIFA World Cup third place: 1998

Individual

- 1998 FIFA World Cup: Golden Boot
- 1998 FIFA World Cup: Silver Ball
- 1998 FIFA World Cup: All-Star Team
- Onze de Bronze: 1998
- Ballon d'Or runner-up: 1998
- FIFA World Player of the Year Bronze Award: 1998
- 1987 FIFA U-20 World Cup: Silver Shoe
- Yugoslav First League Top Goal Scorer: 1988-89
- UEFA European Under-21 Championship 1990: Golden Player
- UEFA European Under-21 Championship 1990: Golden Boot
- UEFA Euro Team of the Tournament: 1996
- ADN Eastern European Footballer of the Season: 1996, 1998
- ESM Team of the Year: 1996–97
- Croatian Footballer of the Year: 1992, 1994, 1995, 1996, 1997, 1998
- Croatian Team of the Year: 1999, 2000
- Franjo Bučar State Award for Sport: 1998
- Croatian Sportsman of the year: 1998
- World Soccer 100 Greatest Players of the 20th Century: 1999
- UEFA Jubilee Awards Croatia's Golden Player: 2004
- FIFA 100: 2004
- Honoree of Osijek: 2008
- Vecernji list Croatian Player of the Century
- All-time top scorer of the Croatia national team

Orders

- Order of Danica Hrvatska with face of Franjo Bučar: 1995
- Order of the Croatian Trefoil: 1998
- Order of Duke Trpimir with Ribbon and Star: 2018

== See also ==
- List of top international men's football goalscorers by country
- List of FIFA World Cup top goalscorers

Awards and achievements
| Preceded by Hristo Stoichkov; Oleg Salenko | FIFA World Cup Golden Shoe; 1998 | Succeeded by Ronaldo |
| Preceded by Roberto Baggio | FIFA World Cup Silver Ball; 1998 | Succeeded by Ronaldo |
| Preceded by Raúl | Real Madrid top scorer 24 goals 1996–97 | Succeeded by Fernando Morientes |
