= Maksym Navrotskyi =

Ukrainian footballer

Personal information
- Full name: Maksym Petrovych Navrotskyi
- Date of birth: 29 June 2000 (age 26)
- Place of birth: Bila Tserkva, Ukraine
- Height: 1.84 m (6 ft 0 in)
- Position: Centre-forward

Team information
- Current team: Viktoria Aschaffenburg
- Number: 29

Youth career
- 2013–2016: Arsenal Bila Tserkva
- 2016–2018: Munkach Mukachevo
- 2018–2019: ARZ Bila Tserkva

Senior career*
Years	Team	Apps	(Gls)
2018	Munkach Mukachevo	1	(0)
2018–2019	Granica Lubycza Królewska		
2019–2020	Eintracht Lüttchendorf	10	(1)
2020–2021	Mynai	0	(0)
2021–2022	Kremin Kremenchuk	19	(1)
2022	→ Maksimir (loan)	10	(2)
2022	Zagreb	14	(6)
2023	APS Patrai		
2023	Uskok	10	(3)
2024–2025	Zmaj Makarska	30	(2)
2025	Drava Ptuj	3	(0)
2025–	Viktoria Aschaffenburg	15	(0)
- * Club domestic league appearances and goals as of 28 June 2026

Maksym Petrovych Navrotskyi (Ukrainian: Максим Петрович Навроцький; born 29 June 2000) is a Ukrainian professional footballer who plays as a centre-forward for the German Regionalliga Bayern club Viktoria Aschaffenburg.

Navrotskyi moved to Ukrainian First League club Kremin Kremenchuk in July 2021 from Mynai. He featured in 19 matches, scoring 1 goal. Due to the Russian invasion of Ukraine he joined Croatian Third Football League club Maksimir. His loan lasted from 8 April to 30 June. After returning to Kremin his contract ended on 8 August. Navrotskyi then joined Croatian Forth Football League club Zagreb. In 2023 he was playing in Third football league in Greece for APS Patrai.
