= SpVgg 03 Neu-Isenburg =

German football club

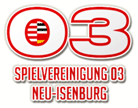
- Nickname(s): Null Drei (Zero Three)
- Founded: 1903
- Ground: Sportpark Neu-Isenburg
- Capacity: 10,000
- Chairman: Jürgen Holzmann
- Manager: Nick Janovsky
- League: Verbandsliga Hessen-Süd (VI)
- 2019–20: 7th
Home colours	Away colours

SpVgg 03 Neu-Isenburg is a German association football club from the city of Neu-Isenburg, Hesse. The roots of the club are in the founding of Freispielclub Neu-Isenburg on 13 June 1903. Over the next three-and-a-half decades, the association went through mergers with a number of other local clubs. In 1913, they joined Sportclub 1905 Neu-Isenburg to form Fußballverein Neu-Isenburg, which in 1921 merged with Fußball-Klub Viktoria Neu-Isenburg to become Verein für Leibesübungen 03 Neu-Isenburg.

== History ==
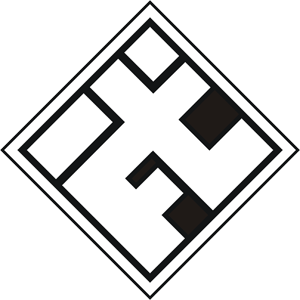
Historical logo of predecessor VfL Neu-Isenburg ca. 1921.

These predecessor sides were competitive at the local level with several titles and top three finishes to their credit. The new VfL had instantenious success, winning the Kreisliga Südmain in 1922. As a second division side VfL took part in the promotion round for the Gauliga Südwest, one of 16 regional top-flight divisions formed in the 1933 reorganization of German football under the Third Reich, in 1937 and 1938, but were unsuccessful in their attempt to advance. The club underwent another merger in 1938 joining Sportverein 1911 Neu-Isenburg to become Spielvereinigung 03 Neu-Isenburg.

SpVgg again took part in Gauliga promotion play in 1941 and 1942, finally winning their way into the Gauliga Hessen-Nassau (I) for two seasons in 1942–44. The division collapsed as World War II overtook the country. Following the conflict SpVgg, like most organizations in Germany, including sports and football clubs, was ordered disbanded by the occupying Allied forces. The club was reconstituted as Sportgemeinde Neu-Isenburg in 1945, before resuming its identity as SpVgg the following year.

=== National Amateur Champions ===
They were part of the Landesliga Großhessen-West (II) in the 1945–46 season and beat Viktoria Aschaffenburg 4–1 in a qualifying match for the Oberliga Süd (I). However the result was annulled because of the use of an ineligible player by Neu-Isenburg, and Aschaffenburg went on to beat two other clubs to advance. SpVgg slipped to lower-level local competition before moving up to play in the Amateurliga Hessen (III) in 1953, where they captured the title in 1956.

The club enjoyed its greatest successes in the mid-1950s. In 1954, they played their way to the national amateur final, where they dropped a 1:6 decision to TSV Marl-Hüls. They returned to that same stage in 1956 and this time emerged victorious, beating VfB Speldorf 3–2.

Also in 1956, Neu-Isenburg qualified for the 2. Liga Süd (II), where they earned a string of indifferent mid-table finishes over the course of seven seasons. Following the 1963 founding of the Bundesliga, Germany's first professional top-flight league, the second division was reorganized into northern and southern Regionalligas. Neu-Isenburg played a single season in the Regionalliga Süd (II) before being sent down to the Amateurliga Hessen (III) after a 17th-place finish. They remained a third-tier club through the remainder of the 1960s and on into the 1970s. The team advanced to the semi-finals of the amateur national championship in 1967 and then narrowly missed relegation in 1969, when they beat Tus Naunheim 2–0 in a postseason match staged to determine which of the two sides would stay up. In 1974, they were relegated following an 18th-place finish, but quickly rebounded after a Landesliga Hessen-Süd (IV) title. SpVgg spent only two more seasons in the Amateurliga before finally slipping away to lower-level local competition. The team made its only appearance in DFB-Pokal (German Cup) play in 1984, going out in the second preliminary round.

Most recently, Neu-Isenburg took the Bezirksoberliga Frankfurt Ost (VII) title and now play in the Verbandsliga Hessen-Süd (VI).

== Honours ==
The club's honours:

=== League ===
- German amateur championship
  - Champions: 1956
  - Runners-up: 1954
- Kreisliga Südmain (I)
  - Champions: 1922
- Amateurliga Hessen (III)
  - Champions: 1956
- Landesliga Hessen-Süd
  - Champions: 1975
  - Runners-up: 1982
- Bezirksoberliga Frankfurt Ost (VII)
  - Champions: 2008

=== Cup ===
- Hesse Cup
  - Runners-up: 1953, 1983

== Notable members ==
- Georg Xandry, served as General Secretary of the German Football Association
