= Kreisliga Südmain =

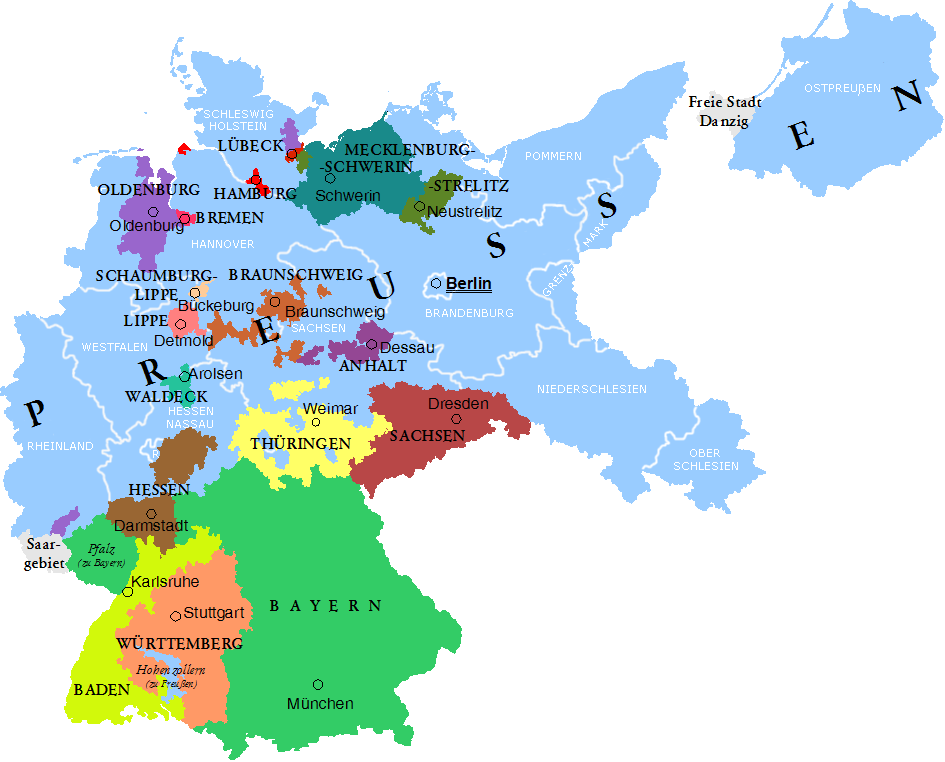
- Founded: 1919
- Folded: 1923
- Replaced by: Bezirksliga Main
- Country: Germany
- State: People's State of Hesse
- Level on pyramid: Level 1
- Last champions: Kickers Offenbach (1922–23)

The Kreisliga Südmain (English: District league South Main) was the highest association football league in parts of the German state of Hesse from 1919 to 1923. The league was disbanded with the introduction of the Bezirksliga Main in 1923.

The league is named after the river Main, which flows through Frankfurt am Main and reaches the Rhine near Mainz. The league was formed from clubs from the southern side of the river, around the Offenbach am Main area. With two clubs from Aschaffenburg, it also included teams from the Bavaria.

== Overview ==
=== Predecessor ===
From 1907, four regional leagues were formed within the structure of the Southern German football championship, in a move to improve the organisation of football in Southern Germany, these being:

- Ostkreis-Liga, covering Bavaria
- Nordkreis-Liga, covering Hesse
- Südkreis-Liga, covering Württemberg, Baden and Alsace
- Westkreis-Liga, covering the Palatinate, Lorraine and the southern Rhine Province

In 1908, a first Nordkreis-Liga (English: Northern District League) was established, consisting of ten clubs and playing a home-and-away season. With the outbreak of the First World War, league football came to a halt and, during the war, games were only played on a limited level.

=== Post-First World War ===
With the collapse of the German Empire in 1918, no Nordkreis championship was played in 1918-19 but football returned to a more organised system in 1919.

Southern Germany, now without the Alsace region, which had to be returned to France, was sub-divided into ten Kreisligas, these being:

- Kreisliga Hessen
- Kreisliga Nordbayern
- Kreisliga Nordmain
- Kreisliga Odenwald
- Kreisliga Pfalz
- Kreisliga Saar
- Kreisliga Südbayern
- Kreisliga Südmain
- Kreisliga Südwest
- Kreisliga Württemberg

The clubs of the former Nordkreis-Liga were split into three regional competitions, Nordmain, Südmain and Hessen, each with ten clubs. The three league winners advanced to the Southern championship. This system applied for the 1919-20 and 1920-21 season.

In 1921-22, the Kreisliga Südmain was split into two groups of eight, increasing the number of tier-one clubs in the region to 16. The two league winners then played a final to determine the Südmain champion, which in turn advanced to a Main championship final against the Nordmain champion. The Hessen champion was not part of this series but rather played a Rhinehesse/Saar championship. This "watering down" of football in the region lasted for only one season, in 1922-23, the number of top clubs was reduced to eight clubs in a single division, with a Main final against the Nordmain champion once more.

In 1923, a league reform which was decided upon in Darmstadt, Hesse, established the Southern German Bezirksligas which were to replace the Kreisligas. The best four teams each from the Südmain and Nordmain were admitted to the new Bezirksliga Main. The four clubs from Südmain were:

- Kickers Offenbach
- SC Bürgel
- Viktoria Aschaffenburg
- SpVgg Offenbach

== National success ==
The clubs from the Kreisliga Südmain were not particularly successful in this era and none managed to qualify for the German championship.

=== Main championship ===
Played in 1922 and 1923, these were the finals:

- 1922:
  - Südmain final: VfL Neu-Isenburg - Union Niederrad 3-0 / 4-1
  - Main final: Germania 94 Frankfurt - VfL Neu-Isenburg 1-0 / 0-3 / 4-2
- 1923:
  - Main final: FSV Frankfurt - Kickers Offenbach 0-1 / 7-2 / 2-1

=== Southern German championship ===
Qualified teams and their success:

- 1920:
  - Kickers Offenbach, Group stage
- 1921:
  - Kickers Offenbach, Group stage
- 1922:
  - VfL Neu-Isenburg, not qualified
- 1923:
  - Kickers Offenbach, not qualified

== Winners and runners-up of the Kreisliga Südmain ==
Season	Champions	Runner-Up
1919–20	Kickers Offenbach	SC Bürgel
1920–21	Kickers Offenbach	SC Bürgel
1921–22	VfL Neu-Isenburg	Union Niederrad
1922–23	Kickers Offenbach	SC Bürgel

== Placings in the Kreisliga Südmain 1919-23 ==
Club	1920	1921	1922	1923
Kickers Offenbach	1	1	2	1
SC Bürgel	2	2		2
Viktoria Neu-Isenburg ^{2}	3	4		
FV Offenbach	4	6	4	
FV Neu-Isenburg ^{2}	5	7		
Germania Bieber	6	5	5	
VfR Offenbach ^{1}	7	8	8	
Union Niederrad	8	3	1	5
BSC 99 Offenbach	9		7	
Kickers Viktoria Mühlheim	10		3	8
FV Sprendlingen		9	4	7
TV Heusenstamm		10	6	
VfL Neu-Isenburg ^{2}			1	6
TV Aschaffenburg-Damm			5	
FC Egelsbach			7	
Viktoria Aschaffenburg ^{3}			3	3
Union Wixhausen			6	
Sachsenhausen 03			8	
SpVgg Offenbach				4

- ^{1} Withdrew before or during the season.
- ^{2} FV and Viktoria merged in 1921 to form VfL Neu-Isenburg.
- ^{3} Viktoria moved from the Kreisliga Odenwald to the Kreisliga Nordmain in 1920 and then to the Kreisliga Südmain in 1921.
