= Gregor Židan =

Slovenian footballer and politician

- Židan in 2021

Personal information
- Full name: Gregor Židan
- Date of birth: 5 October 1965 (age 61)
- Place of birth: Ljubljana, SR Slovenia, Yugoslavia
- Height: 1.71 m (5 ft 7 in)
- Position: Defensive midfielder

Senior career*
Years	Team	Apps	(Gls)
1984–1990	Olimpija	79+	(5+)
1990–1992	Dinamo Zagreb	48	(2)
1993–2001	Maribor	236	(28)
2002	Vrhnika	6	(0)
2002–2003	Livar	9	(0)

International career
1990	Croatia	1	(0)
1992–1996	Slovenia	19	(0)
- * Club domestic league appearances and goals

Gregor Židan (born 5 October 1965) is a Slovenian retired football midfielder and a politician.

== International career ==
Židan first represented Croatia, playing one unofficial friendly match against the United States on 17 October 1990, coming on as a 71st-minute substitute for Saša Peršon.

He then was capped 19 times for Slovenia between 1992 and 1996, his final international was an April 1996 World Cup qualification match away against Greece.
