= Muhamed Preljević =

Serbian-born Bosnian footballer and coach

Personal information
- Full name: Muhamed Preljević
- Date of birth: 16 June 1964 (age 62)
- Place of birth: Prijepolje, SFR Yugoslavia
- Height: 1.83 m (6 ft 0 in)
- Position: Defender

Senior career*
| Years | Team | Apps | (Gls) |
| 1983–1987 | Bor | 69 | (2) |
| 1987–1991 | Dinamo Zagreb | 80 | (1) |
| 1991–1994 | Hallescher FC | 47 | (3) |
| 1994–1996 | Hertha Zehlendorf | 50 | (1) |
| 1996–1997 | Greuther Fürth | 13 | (0) |
| 1998–1999 | Viktoria Aschaffenburg | | |
| 1999–2003 | Viktoria Kahl | | |
| 2003–2005 | Sportfreunde Seligenstadt | | |

Managerial career
- 2003–2004: Viktoria Aschaffenburg (asst)
- 2004–2006: Bosnia and Herzegovina (asst)
- 2005–2006: Viktoria Aschaffenburg (asst)
- 2006–2007: Viktoria Aschaffenburg
- 20xx–2011: Sportfreunde Seligenstadt (asst)
- 2011–2017: Viktoria Kahl
- 2017—2018: SG Heigenbrücken/Heinrichsthal
- 2018—2021: FC Hochspessart
- * Club domestic league appearances and goals

Muhamed Preljević (Serbian Cyrillic: Мухамед Прељевић; born 16 June 1964) is a Serbian-born Bosnian former footballer and now a coach. He started his career in Yugoslavia, playing for FK Bor and NK Dinamo Zagreb until moving to Germany during the Yugoslav Wars where he played for several teams in the 2nd Bundesliga.

== Career ==
Born in Prijepolje, SR Serbia, Muhamed Preljević started his career in Yugoslavia where, after playing with FK Bor in the Second League, he joined NK Dinamo Zagreb in 1987 and played with them in the Yugoslav First League until 1991.

With the break-up of Yugoslavia he moves to Germany and joins Hallescher FC playing back then in the 2. Bundesliga. He played in Germany until 2005 having represented Hertha 03 Zehlendorf, SpVgg Greuther Fürth, Viktoria Aschaffenburg, Viktoria Kahl and Sportfreunde Seligenstadt.

After retiring he became a coach. He was assistant manager of the Bosnia and Herzegovina national football team between 2004 and 2006.

In summer 2006, he became the assistant manager of Viktoria Aschaffenburg, and between December 2006 and March 2007 he took the role of the main coach.

== External sources ==
- Muhamed Preljević at fussballdaten.de (in German)
- Muhamed Preljevic playing and coaching career at kleeblatt-chronik.de
