= Yugoslav Youth Football Cup =

The Yugoslav Youth Football Cup was the most important youth football tournament in Yugoslavia.

== Finals ==
Season	Winner	Scoreline	Runner-up
1963–64	Red Star Belgrade	7–0	Radnički 1923
1964–65	Partizan	2–1	Vardar
1965–66	Red Star Belgrade	4–2	Rijeka
1966–67	Dinamo Zagreb	4–0	Radnički 1923
1967–68	Partizan	2–0	Olimpija Ljubljana
1968–69	Red Star Belgrade	3–0	Velež Mostar
1969–70	Hajduk Split	2–0	Olimpija Ljubljana
1970–71	Hajduk Split	2–1	Sarajevo
1971–72	Hajduk Split	0–0 (5–3 pen.)	Sarajevo
1972–73	Dinamo Zagreb	2–0	Olimpija Ljubljana
1973–74	Partizan	4–1, 3–2	Olimpija Ljubljana
1974–75	Čelik Zenica	2–0	Hajduk Split
1975–76	Sarajevo	3–1	Vardar
1976–77	Hajduk Split	0–0 (4–2 pen.)	Velež Mostar
1977–78	Novi Sad	1–1 (4–2 pen.)	Dinamo Zagreb
1978–79	Hajduk Split	4–1, 2–2	Red Star Belgrade
1979–80	Hajduk Split	2–1	Spartak Subotica
1980–81	Sutjeska Nikšić	2–1	Sarajevo
1981–82	Rijeka	3–1	Vojvodina Novi Sad
1982–83	Partizan	1–0	Sutjeska Nikšić
1983–84	Vardar	3–2	Vojvodina Novi Sad
1984–85	Vojvodina Novi Sad	2–1	Hajduk Split
1985–86	Vojvodina Novi Sad	1–0	Osijek
1986–87	Red Star Belgrade	4–2	Velež Mostar
1987–88	Osijek	4–1	OFK Titograd
1988–89	Velež Mostar	0–0 (4–1 pen.)	Vardar
1989–90	Red Star Belgrade	1–0	Proleter Zrenjanin
1990–91	Budućnost Podgorica	1–1 (4–3 pen.)	Rijeka
