= Viktoria Aschaffenburg =

- Full name: SV Viktoria 01 e.V. Aschaffenburg
- Founded: 6 August 1901; 124 years ago
- Ground: Stadion am Schönbusch
- Capacity: 6,620
- Head coach: Simon Goldhammer
- League: Bayernliga Nord (V)
- 2025–26: Regionalliga Bayern, 17th of 18 (relegated)
- Website: sva01.de
| Home colours | Away colours |

SV Viktoria 01 Aschaffenburg is a German football club based in Aschaffenburg, Bavaria.

Even though Aschaffenburg is located in Bavaria, Viktoria Aschaffenburg historically played its football in the Hessenliga (V) and the associated Hessian leagues, rather than the Bayernliga (V), against clubs from closer, neighbouring cities. This also reflects in part the history of the region, not traditionally part of Bavaria. The nearby Bavarian club FC Bayern Alzenau has also played in the Hessenliga for the same reasons. After 67 seasons in Hesse, from 1945 onwards, the members of the club voted with an 80% majority to return to Bavaria from the 2012–13 season onwards.

== History ==
The club was formed on 24 June 1904 out of the merger of FC Aschaffenburg (6 August 1901) and FC Viktoria Aschaffenburg (12 April 1902). Renamed Sportverein Viktoria 01 Aschaffenburg on 3 June 1906 the united side played in the Kreisliga Odenwald, Kreisliga Nordmain, Kreisliga Südmain and Bezirksliga Main-Hessen (Gruppe Main) for a couple of seasons in the 1920s, changing leagues frequently.

In 1937 they briefly merged with Reichsbahn TuSpo Aschaffenburg to play as Reichsbahn-Viktoria Aschaffenburg, but were an independent side again by 1939. They made a late, short-lived appearance in top flight football in 1942, playing a single season in the Gauliga Bayern (Nord), one of sixteen premier divisions established in the 1933 re-organization of German football under the Third Reich.

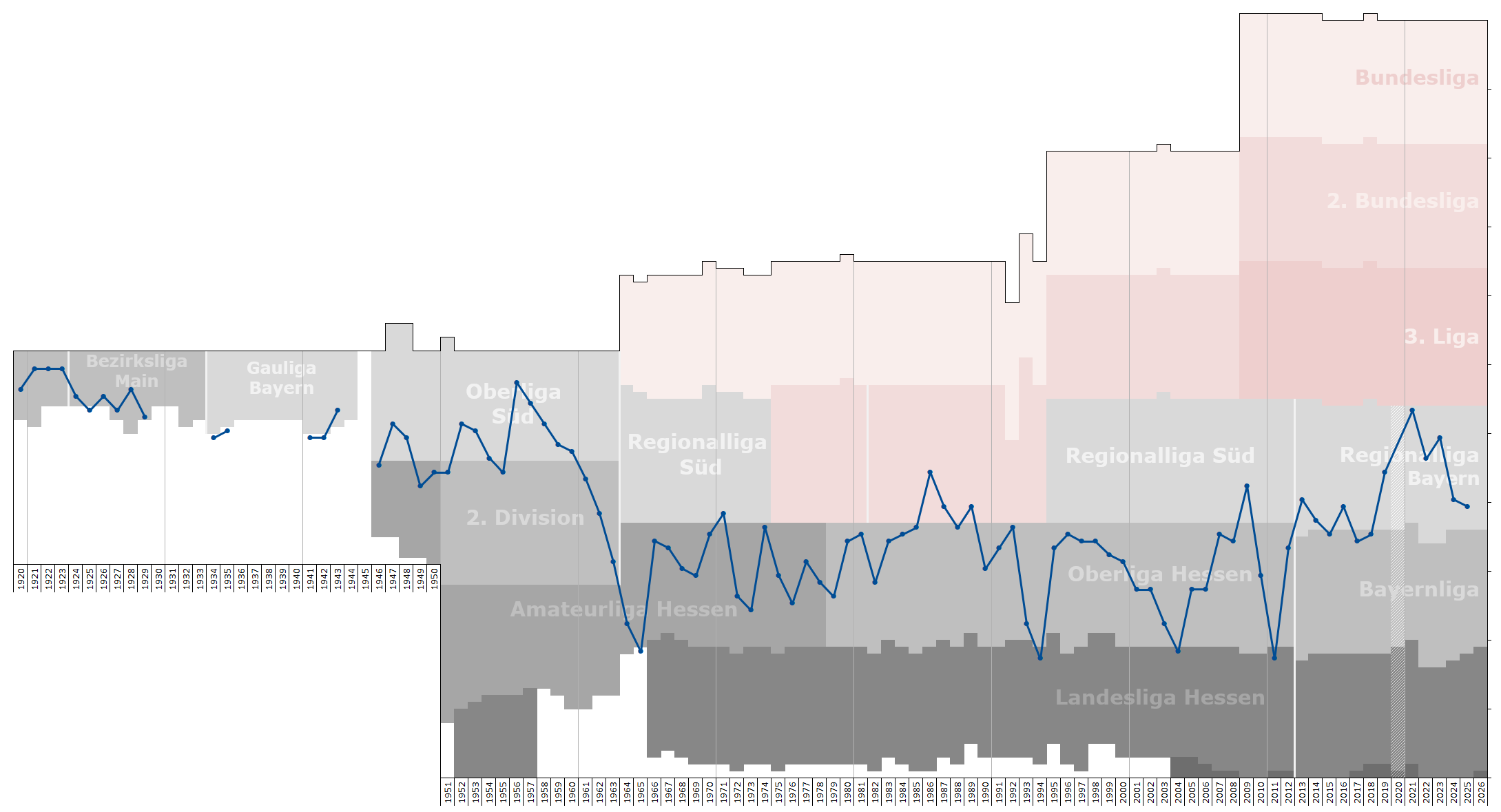
Historical chart of Viktoria Aschaffenburg league performance

Aschaffenburg returned to the top flight after World War II playing in the Oberliga Süd for two seasons in the late 40s and then through most of the 50s, competing against sides that would later go on to play in the Bundesliga, Germany's first top tier professional league, such as FC Bayern Munich, 1. FC Nürnberg, and VfB Stuttgart, in front of crowds of 16,000 to 19,000. Generally a lower table side whose best result was a fifth-place finish in 1956, a series of poor performances saw Aschaffenburg drop to tier III play in the Amateurliga Hessen/Amateur Oberliga-Hessen well before the formation of the Bundesliga in 1963.

The team's best performances came in the 1980s when they twice won the Oberliga Hessen title and promotion to 2. Bundesliga, where they played the 1985–86, 1986–87 and 1988–89 seasons. Through this period and into the early 90s Aschaffenburg made a half dozen appearances in the early rounds of DFB-Pokal (German Cup) play. The club's best cup performance came in 1988 when they eliminated then-Bundesliga side 1. FC Köln (1–0) in the second round before eventually going out in the quarterfinals against Werder Bremen (1–3).

A poor finish led to a move down to the fourth division play in the 1993–94 season. In 1995, the clubs under 19 side ended a remarkable series in German football. After 20 consecutive titles in the Under 19 Bayernliga (northern group) by the 1. FC Nürnberg, Viktoria finished this series, becoming only the second club to win this league. Viktoria's junior teams play in the Bavarian league system, unlike its senior team.

The side was relegated to Landesliga Hessen-Süd (V) for a single season in 2003–04 and have since returned to play in Oberliga-Hessen (IV).

A third-place finish in the Oberliga in 2007–08 meant the club became one of the four clubs from this league to gain entry in the Regionalliga Süd for the next season. After finishing 13th in the league in 2008–09, outside the relegation ranks, the club decided to return to the now-named Hessenliga due to financial reasons. Viktoria experienced a further drop at the end of the 2009–10 season when it was relegated to the tier-six Verbandsliga Hessen-Süd despite an eighth-place finish for financial reasons.

Older logo

In this league, Viktoria came second in 2010–11 and qualified for the promotion round to the Hessenliga, where it succeeded. In November 2011, the members of the club voted for a return to the Bavarian league system after the club had played in Hesse since 1945. Alongside the senior team, the reserve side will also switch associations while the club's youth teams already play in Bavaria. The reasons for the switch were the easier qualification modus for the revamped Regionalligas for 2012, in Hesse the club needed to win the league while for Bavaria a ninth-place finish was adequate for promotion. Another reason was also the lesser requirements in regards to infrastructure for the new Regionalliga Bayern, an important factor for the recovering club who had just escaped insolvency in the previous year. A fourth-place finish in the Hessenliga in 2011–12 allowed the team to qualify for the new Regionalliga.

After a 15th place in the inaugural Regionalliga Bayern season Viktoria came second-last in the league in 2013–14 and was relegated from the league, now to the Bayernliga Nord, the northern division of the Bayernliga. The club won its division in 2014–15 and made an immediate return to the Regionalliga. It finished 15th in 2015–16 and had to enter the relegation play-off to defend its league place where it lost to SpVgg Bayern Hof and TSV 1860 Rosenheim and dropped back to the Bayernliga.

In 2018–19, the club enjoyed an excellent run in the Bavarian Cup, defeating 3. Liga club TSV 1860 Munich 3–2 at the semi-final stage, before eventually losing 3–0 to local rivals Würzburger Kickers in the final before a packed crowd of 6,033 at the Stadion am Schönbusch.

== Honours ==
=== League ===
- 2. Oberliga Süd (II)
  - Runners-up: (2) 1951, 1955
- Hessenliga (III–V)
  - Champions: (4) 1974, 1985, 1988, 1992
  - Runners-up: 2007
- Bayernliga Nord (V)
  - Champions: (2) 2015, 2018
- Landesliga Hessen-Süd (V)
  - Champions: 2004
- Verbandsliga Hessen-Süd (VI)
  - Runners-up: 2011

=== Cup ===
- DFB-Pokal
  - Quarter-finals: 1987–88
- Hessenpokal
  - Winners: 1991
  - Runners-up: 2008
- Bavarian Cup
  - Runners-up: 2019

=== Youth ===
- Bavarian Under 19 championship
  - Runners-up: (3) 1955, 1995, 2004
- Bavarian Under 17 championship
  - Runners-up: 2002
- Bavarian Under 15 championship
  - Winners: 1999

== Recent seasons ==
The recent season-by-season performance of the club:

| Year | Division | Tier | Position |
|---|---|---|---|
| 1999–2000 | Hessenliga | IV | 6th |
| 2000–01 | Hessenliga | IV | 10th |
| 2001–02 | Hessenliga | IV | 10th |
| 2002–03 | Hessenliga | IV | 16th ↓ |
| 2003–04 | Landesliga Hessen-Süd | V | 1st ↑ |
| 2004–05 | Hessenliga | IV | 10th |
| 2005–06 | Hessenliga | IV | 10th |
| 2006–07 | Hessenliga | IV | 2nd |
| 2007–08 | Hessenliga | IV | 3rd ↑ |
| 2008–09 | Regionalliga Süd | IV | 13th ↓ |
| 2009–10 | Hessenliga | V | 8th ↓ |
| 2010–11 | Verbandsliga Hessen-Süd | VI | 2nd ↑ |
| 2011–12 | Hessenliga | V | 4th ↑ |
| 2012–13 | Regionalliga Bayern | IV | 15th |
| 2013–14 | Regionalliga Bayern | IV | 18th ↓ |
| 2014–15 | Bayernliga Nord | V | 1st ↑ |
| 2015–16 | Regionalliga Bayern | IV | 15th ↓ |
| 2016–17 | Bayernliga Nord | V | 2nd |
| 2017–18 | Bayernliga Nord | V | 1st ↑ |
| 2018–19 | Regionalliga Bayern | IV | 10th |
| 2019–21 | Regionalliga Bayern | IV | 2nd |
| 2021–22 | Regionalliga Bayern | IV | 8th |
| 2022–23 | Regionalliga Bayern | IV | 5th |
| 2023–24 | Regionalliga Bayern | IV | 14th |
| 2024–25 | Regionalliga Bayern | IV | 15th |
| 2025–26 | Regionalliga Bayern | IV | 17th ↓ |

- With the introduction of the Regionalligas in 1994 and the 3. Liga in 2008 as the new third tier, below the 2. Bundesliga, all leagues below dropped one tier. Also in 2008, the majority of football leagues in Hesse were renamed, with the Oberliga Hessen becoming the Hessenliga, the Landesliga becoming the Verbandsliga, the Bezirksoberliga becoming the Gruppenliga and the Bezirksliga becoming the Kreisoberliga.

| ↑ Promoted | ↓ Relegated |

== Current squad ==
As of 6 February 2026

Note: Flags indicate national team as defined under FIFA eligibility rules; some limited exceptions apply. Players may hold more than one non-FIFA nationality.

| No. | Pos. | Nation | Player |
|---|---|---|---|
| 1 | GK | NED | Eric Verstappen |
| 2 | DF | TUR | Emirhan Delikaya |
| 3 | DF | GER | Hendrik Ehmann |
| 4 | MF | GER | Niklas Biehrer |
| 5 | DF | GER | Niklas Borger |
| 6 | MF | GER | Roberto Desch |
| 7 | DF | GER | David Nene |
| 8 | MF | GER | Lars Kleiner |
| 9 | FW | GUI | Hady Kallo |
| 10 | MF | GER | Benjamin Baier (captain) |
| 11 | DF | GER | Arda Nadaroglu |
| 12 | GK | GER | Elias Derwein |
| 15 | DF | GER | Benjamin Franz |
| 17 | MF | GER | Adrian Asani |

| No. | Pos. | Nation | Player |
|---|---|---|---|
| 18 | MF | GER | Nino Cassaniti |
| 20 | FW | GER | Justin Berg |
| 21 | FW | GER | Michael Gorbunow |
| 22 | FW | GER | Alexander Leuthard |
| 23 | MF | GER | Henry Held |
| 24 | FW | GER | Eren Bozan |
| 25 | DF | GER | Maximilian Kohlert |
| 26 | GK | GER | Maximilian Grimm |
| 27 | FW | GER | Jesper Penterman |
| 29 | FW | UKR | Maksym Navrotskyi |
| 30 | FW | GER | Matvey Obolkin |
| 33 | MF | GER | Robin Schwarz |
| 37 | DF | GER | Patrick Seitz |
| 47 | MF | MAR | Othmane El Idrissi (on loan from Darmstadt) |

== Recent managers ==
Recent managers of the club:

| Manager | Start | Finish |
|---|---|---|
| Ernst Lehner | | |
| Horst Heese | April 1986 | December 1986 |
| Timo Zahnleiter | 1 July 1989 | 30 June 1990 |
| Werner Lorant | 1 July 1990 | 30 June 1992 |
| Rudi Bommer (player-coach) | 1 July 1998 | 30 June 2000 |
| Nenad Salov | 1 May 2003 | 9 December 2006 |
| Muhamed Preljevic | 10 December 2006 | 27 March 2007 |
| Manfred Allig | 28 March 2007 | 30 June 2007 |
| Andreas Möller | 1 July 2007 | 30 June 2008 |
| Ronny Borchers | 1 July 2008 | 30 June 2009 |
| Marco Roth | 1 July 2009 | 30 June 2010 |
| Peter Lack | 1 July 2011 | 19 March 2012 |
| Antonio Abbruzzese | 20 March 2012 | 4 January 2013 |
| Werner Dreßel | 9 January 2013 | 23 April 2013 |
| Antonio Abbruzzese | 23 April 2013 | 5 May 2013 |
| Julio Alvarez | 5 May 2013 | 17 June 2013 |
| Slobodan Komljenovic | 17 June 2013 | 19 October 2015 |
| Rudi Bommer | 20 October 2015 | 4 December 2015 |
| Jürgen Baier | 23 December 2015 | 31 August 2016 |
| Jochen Seitz | 7 September 2016 | 30 June 2023 |

== DFB Cup appearances ==
The club has qualified for the first round of the German Cup six times:

| Season | Round | Date | Home | Away | Result | Attendance |
|---|---|---|---|---|---|---|
| 1979–80 DFB-Pokal | First round | 24 August 1979 | FSV Frankfurt | Viktoria Aschaffenburg | 2–0 | 1,500 |
| 1986–87 DFB-Pokal | First round | 30 August 1987 | Viktoria Aschaffenburg | Waldhof Mannheim | 1–2 | 9,000 |
| 1987–88 DFB-Pokal | First round | 29 August 1987 | Viktoria Aschaffenburg | SG Wattenscheid 09 | 4–0 | 5,000 |
| 1987–88 DFB-Pokal | Second round | 24 October 1987 | Viktoria Aschaffenburg | 1. FC Köln | 1–0 | 12,000 |
| 1987–88 DFB-Pokal | Third round | 13 February 1988 | Hessen Kassel | Viktoria Aschaffenburg | 0–1 | 8,000 |
| 1987–88 DFB-Pokal | Quarter final | 13 February 1988 | Viktoria Aschaffenburg | Werder Bremen | 1–3 | 13,000 |
| 1989–90 DFB-Pokal | First round | 20 August 1989 | Viktoria Aschaffenburg | Karlsruher SC | 2–6 | 3,500 |
| 1991–92 DFB-Pokal | First round | 1 August 1991 | Viktoria Aschaffenburg | none | bye | bye |
| 1991–92 DFB-Pokal | Second round | 17 August 1991 | VfL Wolfsburg | Viktoria Aschaffenburg | 4–3 aet | 1,400 |
| 1992–93 DFB-Pokal | First round | 18 August 1992 | Viktoria Aschaffenburg | none | bye | bye |
| 1992–93 DFB-Pokal | Second round | 12 September 1992 | Viktoria Aschaffenburg | VfL Osnabrück | 0–6 | 900 |
