= Fussballdaten.de =

German-language association football website

fussballdaten.de
- Website type: Association football statistics
- Available in: German
- Owner: Sport-Dienst-Agentur Merk
- Website: www.fussballdaten.de
- Commercial: yes
- Current status: Active

fussballdaten.de is a German-language website that predominantly collects comprehensive statistics on the top five tiers of German football.

The website offers statistics on every Bundesliga, 2. Bundesliga and 3. Liga match and team since the leagues' foundation in 1963, 1974 and 2008, respectively. The site also provides information on the German Regionalliga and the Oberliga, currently the fourth and fifth divisions respectively.
