= Željko Cupan =

Croatian footballer

Personal information
- Full name: Željko Cupan
- Date of birth: 30 December 1963 (age 62)
- Place of birth: Zagreb, SFR Yugoslavia
- Position: Defender

Senior career*
Years	Team	Apps	(Gls)
1981–1992	Dinamo Zagreb	184	(5)
1992–1995	Segesta	35	(1)
- * Club domestic league appearances and goals

Željko Cupan (born 30 December 1963, in Zagreb) is a Croatian RETIRED football player. Most of his career he spent with Dinamo Zagreb, playing right full-back.

== External sources ==
- http://www.hrrepka.com:8080/app/hnl/prikazIgraca.iface?id=13
- https://gnkdinamopovijest.blogspot.com/2011/05/momcad-po-sezonama.html
- https://www.navolej.com/Statistika/Godine/1982Detalji.htm
