= Kujtim Shala =

Croatia international footballer (born 1964)

Personal information
- Date of birth: 13 July 1964 (age 62)
- Place of birth: Prizren, SR Serbia, SFR Yugoslavia
- Height: 1.82 m (6 ft 0 in)
- Position: Midfielder

Senior career*
Years	Team	Apps	(Gls)
1981–1983	Liria Prizren	22	(3)
1983–1984	Partizan	24	(2)
1984–1989	Prishtina	112	(25)
1989–1991	Dinamo Zagreb	45	(16)
1991–1992	Rennes	27	(5)
1992–1993	Stuttgarter Kickers	33	(10)
1993–1995	Chemnitzer FC	42	(8)
1995–1996	Fortuna Düsseldorf	15	(0)
1996–1998	VfB Leipzig	50	(2)
1998–2000	VfR Mannheim	53	(9)
Total		423	(80)

International career
1990	Croatia XI	1	(0)

Managerial career
- 2005: FC Hochstätt Türkspor
- 2005–2006: Prishtina
- 2008: VfR Mannheim (youth)
- 2014: SVN Zweibrücken (assistant)
- * Club domestic league appearances and goals

Kujtim Shala (Croatian: Kujtim Šalja; born 13 July 1964) is a former professional footballer who played as a midfielder. Born in Yugoslavia, he represented Croatia at international level.

== International career ==
Shala made one appearance for the Croatia national team in a 2–1 win against the United States on 17 October 1990, during a friendly match before the Croatian Football Federation was affiliated by FIFA in 1992.

== Coaching career ==
Shala was the head coach of FC Prishtina in Kosovar Superliga. But after FC Prishtina failed to win the Kosovar Superliga, he was sacked.

In 2008 he was almost selected as head coach of the Kosovo national team. Shala was named assistant to manager Guido Hoffmann at SVN Zweibrücken in October 2014.

== Personal life ==
Shala was born in Prizren, SFR Yugoslavia (now Kosovo) and is of Albanian descent. One of his two sons is fellow footballer Andis Shala.
