= Zvonko Lipovac =

Croatian footballer

Personal information
- Full name: Zvonko Lipovac
- Date of birth: 9 October 1964 (age 62)
- Place of birth: SFR Yugoslavia
- Position: Defender

Youth career
- 1976–1983: FK Borac Banja Luka

Senior career*
Years	Team	Apps	(Gls)
1983–1984	BSK Banja Luka		
1984–1989	Borac Banja Luka		
1989–1990	Dinamo Zagreb	26	(0)
1991–1992	Borac Banja Luka		
1992–1994	Segesta Sisak	41	(0)
1994–1996	Hrvatski Dragovoljac		
1996–1997	Inker Zaprešić	16	(1)
1997–1998	Posavina		
- * Club domestic league appearances and goals

Zvonko Lipovac (born 9 October 1964) is a former Croatian association footballer.

== Club career ==
Lipovac played for Borac Banja Luka and Dinamo Zagreb in the Yugoslav First League. While playing for this club, in 1988, he won Yugoslav Cup.
