= Draženko Prskalo =

Croatian footballer

Personal information
- Date of birth: 18 April 1964 (age 62)
- Place of birth: Stari Slatinik, SR Croatia, SFR Yugoslavia
- Position: Midfielder

Senior career*
Years	Team	Apps	(Gls)
1982–1988	Velež Mostar	106	(6)
1988–1992	Dinamo Zagreb	47	(1)
1992–1994	Atlético Marbella	29	(1)
1994–1995	Segesta	12	(0)

Managerial career
- 2017: Lokomotiva Zagreb (caretaker)
- * Club domestic league appearances and goals

Draženko Prskalo (born 18 April 1964) is a Croatian former footballer who played as a midfielder.

During his club career he played for FK Velež, GNK Dinamo Zagreb, Atletico Marbella and HNK Segesta.

Croatian manager Sergije Krešić, brought him to Spain to play for Segunda División side Atlético Marbella in September 1992.
