= Miralem Ibrahimović =

Bosnian retired footballer (born 1963)

Personal information
- Full name: Miralem Ibrahimović
- Date of birth: 18 January 1963 (age 63)
- Place of birth: Banovići, SFR Yugoslavia
- Height: 1.93 m (6 ft 4 in)
- Position: Goalkeeper

Team information
- Current team: Al Ain (goalkeeping coach)

Senior career*
Years	Team	Apps	(Gls)
1981–1987	Jedinstvo Brčko	103	(0)
1987–1993	Dinamo Zagreb	83	(0)
1993–1994	Zeytinburnuspor	24	(0)
1995–1998	Croatia Zagreb	18	(0)
1998–1999	HNK Cibalia	32	(0)
1999–2002	Jedinstvo Bihać		

Managerial career
- 2016–2017: Al Nassr (goalkeeping coach)
- 2017–2019: Al Ain (goalkeeping coach)
- * Club domestic league appearances and goals

Miralem Ibrahimović (born 18 January 1963) is a Bosnian retired footballer. He is not related to Zlatan Ibrahimović.

== Club career ==
Ibrahimović played for NK Dinamo Zagreb in the Yugoslav First League and in the Croatian Prva HNL.
