= Dražen Biškup =

Croatian footballer and manager

Personal information
- Date of birth: 28 December 1965 (age 60)
- Place of birth: Zagreb, SR Croatia, SFR Yugoslavia
- Height: 1.85 m (6 ft 1 in)
- Position: Defender

Team information
- Current team: Vrbovec (manager)

Senior career*
Years	Team	Apps	(Gls)
1986–1988	NK Zagreb		
1988–1990	Dinamo Zagreb	21	(0)
1990–1994	NK Zagreb	108	(2)
1994–1995	Admira Wacker	21	(0)
1995–2000	NK Zagreb	136	(3)
Total		286	(5)

International career
1991–1992	Croatia	5	(0)

Managerial career
- 2006–2009: Suhopolje
- 2009–2011: Lučko
- 2011–2013: Zelina
- 2014: Zelina
- 2014: Vinogradar
- 2014–2015: Gorica
- 2017: Lučko
- 2017–2018: Lučko
- 2018–2019: Lučko
- 2019–2020: Vinogradar
- 2021-: Vrbovec
- * Club domestic league appearances and goals

Dražen Biškup (born 28 December 1965 in Zagreb) is a Croatian football manager and retired professional footballer who currently manages Vrbovec.

== Club career ==
=== NK Zagreb ===
Biškup played for NK Dinamo Zagreb in the Yugoslav First League and for NK Zagreb in Yugoslav Third League, Yugoslav Second League and later in the Croatian Prva HNL. Biškup spent almost entire his career in NK Zagreb. He started playing professional football in Dinamo, in which he did not receive sufficient minutes on the pitch. Therefore, he decided to join NK Zagreb, which then played in the third division. After two seasons in NK Zagreb he attempted to try one more time with Dinamo, but after his lack of opportunity in Dinamo once again, he returned to the Zagreb team in the season 1990/1991 when Zagreb played in second Yugoslav division and immediately helped them win championship and promotion to the First Division the following year, which have not been played due to the breakup of Yugoslavia. He stayed with Zagreb in the newly established Croatian football league and helped achieve the best results in the club's history. In 1992 season they ended up as vice-champions, after close battle with Hajduk. 1992–93 they won third place, and in 1993–94 they finished second again and again behind the Hajduk for only a point. After a short episode in Austria, he returned to Zagreb and in 1996–97 season made it to the Cup finals in which they lost undeserved with the referee help to Dinamo 1–2 at Maksimir. He played until the end of 1999–2000 season, when he decided to end his career at 35 years of age in his favorite club and leave his place to younger players. For Zagreb he played a total of 244 games in eleven seasons on three occasions and as a defensive player scored five goals.

== International career ==
Biškup made his debut for Croatia in a June 1991 friendly match away against Slovenia, coming on as an 80th-minute substitute for Aljoša Asanović, and earned a total of 5 caps scoring no goals. His final international was an October 1992 friendly against Mexico.

== Coaching career ==
After years of coaching in Suhopolje there was a desire for change. He replaced Suhopolje by another second-league club, NK Lučko, a club whose ambitions were much bigger. It was a debut season in the second division for NK Lučko. He took the club prior tenth round, and lost first game against NK Vinogradar away 3–1. In the end he won fourth place in the league, behind third-placed NK Hrvatski Dragovoljac who won promotion to the first division thanks to two goals scored more than NK Lučko since both teams won 42 points. The following 2010–11 season he managed to secure promotion to first division as vice-champions of the second division. Only better than them was HNK Gorica. In that season NK Lučko made a league record away win against the club which he also managed before, HNK Suhopolje, 7–0. He led the club in their debut season in the first division 2011–12 but did not remain long in the position of head coach because after five rounds, and only one point won in the first division, he concluded an agreement on terminating the contract with NK Lučko on 22 August 2011. Fatal set of results, which resulted in termination of the contract was 1–1 vs Zadar, 0–1 vs Rijeka, 0–2 vs Istra 1961, 0–1 vs Zagreb and 1–2 vs Split. At the end of the season NK Lučko still failed to save their status as a major league club by finishing thirteenth out of sixteen clubs in the championship and were relegated to the second league. Just a few days after, he took up a new job at NK Zelina. NK Zelina competed in the third league and after having played the first round at home against Krk in which they draw 1–1 he was appointed for a head coach just one day before the second round. In his first game on Zelina bench they played away game against one of competitors in the league for the promotion, Vrapče and lost. At end of the championship however, they were able to catch up and become the 2011–12 league champions ahead of Vrapče thanks to a better goal difference since they both had 69 points and won promotion to the Croatian Second League. His second term in NK Lučko began in season 2016/17 when he avoided relegation to Croatian third division. However, he left NK Lučko at the end of season. In season 2017/2018 after Besnik Prenga was sacked, it was announced that Drazen Biskup will replace him and join his former club one more time.

== Statistics ==
As of 30 June 2012

Nat	Team	From	To	Record						
Nat	Team	From	To	G	W	D	L	GF	GA	+/-
(Croatia)	NK Lučko	October 2009	August 2011	52	28	6	18	81	55	+26
(Croatia)	NK Zelina	September 2011	June 2012	33	21	5	7	64	29	+35
Total				85	49	11	25	145	84	+61

G – Matches managed; W – Matches won; D – Matches drawn; L – Matches lost; GF – Goals for; GA – Goals against
