= HNK Hajduk Split league record by opponent =

Croatian association football club record

Hrvatski nogometni klub Hajduk Split is a Croatian association football club based in Split, which currently competes in the top tier division of Croatian football, Prva HNL. Founded in 1911, they played only friendlies during their first years in existence. Between the early 1920s and 1940, Hajduk regularly participated in the Kingdom of Yugoslavia national championship. The club spent their entire existence playing top-flight football, having been a member of the Yugoslav First League from 1946 until its dissolution in 1991. Following the breakup of Yugoslavia the club joined the Croatian First League in its inaugural season in 1992.

Hajduk Split played their inaugural league fixture as part of the Croatian First League on 29 February 1992 against Istra. Since that game they have faced 38 different sides in league football with their most regular opponent having been Dinamo Zagreb.

== Key ==
- † Clubs with this background and symbol in the "Opponent" column are Hajduk Split's divisional rivals in the current season.
- ‡ Clubs with this background and symbol in the "Opponent" column are defunct.
- The name used for each opponent is the name they had when Hajduk Split most recently played a league match against them. Results against each opponent include results against that club under any former name. For example, results against Dinamo Zagreb include matches played against Croatia Zagreb.
- P = matches played; W = matches won; D = matches drawn; L = matches lost; F = goals for; A = goals against; Win% = percentage of total matches won
- The columns headed "First" and "Last" contain the first and most recent seasons in which Hajduk Split played league matches against each opponent.

== Yugoslav league all-time record (1946–1991) ==
Opponent	P	W	D	L	F	A	P	W	D	L	F	A	P	W	D	L	F	A	Win%	First	Last	Notes	
Opponent	Home						Away						Total						Win%	First	Last	Notes	
14. Oktobar ‡	1	1	0	0	4	0		1	1	0	0	4	0		2	2	0	0	8	0	100.00	1946–47	1946–47
Bor	6	6	0	0	21	1		6	0	4	2	2	6		12	6	4	2	23	7	50.00	1968–69	1974–75
Borac Banja Luka	13	10	3	0	30	7		13	3	3	7	9	14		26	13	6	7	39	21	50.00	1961–62	1990–91
Borac Zagreb ‡	1	1	0	0	4	1		1	1	0	0	5	1		2	2	0	0	9	2	100.00	1951	1951
Budućnost Titograd	25	19	3	3	60	20		25	7	6	12	26	30		50	26	9	15	86	50	52.00	1946–47	1990–91
Crvenka	1	1	0	0	2	1		1	0	1	0	1	1		2	1	1	0	3	2	50.00	1970–71	1970–71
Čelik Zenica	17	15	2	0	37	4		17	3	4	10	13	23		34	18	6	10	50	27	52.94	1966–67	1988–89
Dinamo Vinkovci	5	4	1	0	17	5		5	0	2	3	4	8		10	4	3	3	21	13	40.00	1982–83	1986–87
Dinamo Zagreb	45	19	11	15	69	60		45	12	15	18	52	63		90	31	26	33	121	123	34.44	1946–47	1990–91
Iskra Bugojno	1	1	0	0	2	0		1	0	0	1	0	1		2	1	0	1	2	1	50.00	1984–85	1984–85
Lokomotiva	10	8	2	0	31	8		10	4	5	1	19	12		20	12	7	1	50	20	60.00	1946–47	1956–57
Mačva Šabac	1	1	0	0	3	1		1	0	1	0	0	0		2	1	1	0	3	1	50.00	1951	1951
Maribor	5	4	1	0	9	2		5	0	4	1	4	6		10	4	5	1	13	8	40.00	1967–68	1971–72
Nafta Lendava ‡	1	1	0	0	3	0		1	1	0	0	3	1		2	2	0	0	6	1	100.00	1946–47	1946–47
Napredak Kruševac	6	6	0	0	23	4		6	1	4	1	12	8		12	7	4	1	35	12	58.33	1951	1988–89
Naša Krila Zemun ‡	2	0	2	0	1	1		2	1	1	0	2	1		4	1	3	0	3	2	25.00	1948–49	1950
Novi Sad	3	3	0	0	7	2		3	2	1	0	8	2		6	5	1	0	15	4	83.33	1961–62	1963–64
OFK Beograd	36	27	4	5	82	35		36	9	14	13	44	55		72	36	18	18	126	90	50.00	1946–47	1985–86
Olimpija Ljubljana ‡	22	18	1	3	46	15		22	3	7	12	16	32		44	21	8	15	62	47	47.73	1953–54	1990–91
Osijek	16	13	1	2	40	10		16	5	7	4	16	11		32	18	8	6	56	21	56.25	1953–54	1990–91
Partizan	44	17	14	13	59	51		44	7	9	28	45	90		88	24	23	41	104	141	27.27	1946–47	1990–91
Pobeda Skopje ‡	1	1	0	0	3	2		1	0	1	0	1	1		2	1	1	0	4	3	50.00	1946–47	1946–47
Ponziana Trieste	3	2	0	1	9	5		3	1	1	1	3	1		6	3	1	2	12	6	50.00	1946–47	1948–49
Priština	5	3	2	0	10	6		5	0	4	1	3	4		10	3	6	1	13	10	30.00	1983–84	1987–88
Proleter Zrenjanin ‡	5	3	2	0	10	5		5	3	1	1	9	8		10	6	3	1	19	13	60.00	1967–68	1990–91
Rabotnički Skopje	1	1	0	0	3	1		1	1	0	0	2	0		2	2	0	0	5	1	100.00	1953–54	1953–54
Rad	4	3	1	0	10	6		4	2	0	2	3	3		8	5	1	2	13	9	62.50	1987–88	1990–91
Radnički Beograd	9	8	1	0	24	5		9	4	3	2	18	11		18	12	4	2	42	16	66.67	1953–54	1965–66
Radnički Kragujevac	5	5	0	0	15	2		5	3	2	0	7	3		10	8	2	0	22	5	80.00	1969–70	1975–76
Radnički Niš	28	22	1	5	62	22		28	4	8	16	24	50		56	26	9	21	86	72	46.43	1962–63	1990–91
Red Star Belgrade	46	26	15	5	80	38		46	9	10	27	49	88		92	35	25	32	129	126	38.04	1946–47	1990–91
Rijeka	29	20	7	2	63	21		29	4	16	9	27	40		58	24	23	11	90	61	41.38	1946–47	1990–91
Sarajevo	42	25	10	7	81	30		42	6	14	22	36	64		84	31	24	29	117	94	36.90	1947–48	1990–91
Sloboda Tuzla	24	17	4	3	54	14		24	3	10	11	17	33		48	20	14	14	71	47	41.67	1959–60	1990–91
Spartak Subotica	15	12	2	1	39	10		15	8	2	5	19	14		30	20	4	6	58	24	66.67	1946–47	1990–91
RNK Split	2	0	2	0	3	3		2	1	0	1	2	2		4	1	2	1	5	5	25.00	1957–58	1960–61
Sutjeska Nikšić	8	7	1	0	17	3	8	1	2	5	8	16	16	8	3	5	25	19	50.00	1964–65	1987–88		
Teteks Tetovo	1	1	0	0	7	0	1	0	0	1	0	1	2	1	0	1	7	1	50.00	1981–82	1981–82		
Trepča	1	1	0	0	2	0	1	1	0	0	3	2	2	2	0	0	5	2	100.00	1977–78	1977–78		
Trešnjevka	3	3	0	0	12	2	3	0	1	2	3	7	6	3	1	2	15	9	50.00	1963–64	1965–66		
Vardar Skopje	33	21	10	2	83	18	33	10	8	15	43	44	66	31	18	17	126	62	46.97	1947–48	1989–90		
Velež Mostar	37	22	12	3	73	35	37	8	11	18	35	55	74	31	23	20	108	90	41.89	1952–53	1990–91		
Vojvodina	40	23	11	6	75	34	40	11	11	18	43	59	80	34	22	24	118	93	42.50	1948–49	1990–91		
NK Zagreb	18	15	3	0	48	15	18	5	5	8	18	23	36	20	8	8	66	38	55.56	1952	1981–82		
Zemun	2	1	1	0	3	2	2	0	1	1	1	2	4	1	2	1	4	4	25.00	1982–83	1990–91		
Željezničar Sarajevo	34	25	7	2	81	27	32	5	12	15	38	55	66	30	19	17	119	82	45.45	1946–47	1990–91		

== Croatian league all-time record ==
Statistics correct as of match played 29 February 2020

Opponent	P	W	D	L	F	A	P	W	D	L	F	A	P	W	D	L	F	A	Win%	First	Last	Notes		
Opponent	Home						Away						Total						Win%	First	Last	Notes		
Belišće	3	2	1	0	9	3		3	1	1	1	4	4		6	3	2	1	13	7	50.00	1992–93	1994–95	
Cibalia	28	21	5	2	67	19		27	11	11	5	39	27		55	32	16	7	106	46	58.18	1992	2017–18	
Croatia Sesvete ‡	3	3	0	0	12	0		2	1	0	1	5	3		5	4	0	1	17	3	80.00	2008–09	2009–10	^{[A]}
Čakovec	2	2	0	0	6	1		2	1	0	1	3	2		4	3	0	1	9	3	75.00	2000–01	2001–02	
Dinamo Zagreb †	44	19	14	11	58	46		45	6	9	30	31	77		89	25	23	41	89	123	28.09	1992	2019–20	
Dubrava	1	1	0	0	4	0		1	1	0	0	4	3		2	2	0	0	8	3	100.00	1993–94	1993–94	
Dubrovnik	3	3	0	0	18	0		3	2	1	0	4	1		6	5	1	0	22	1	83.33	1992	1993–94	
Gorica †	4	2	1	1	9	2		3	0	1	2	2	6		7	2	2	3	11	8	28.57	2018–19	2019–20	
Hrvatski Dragovoljac	12	9	2	1	26	9		13	3	4	6	15	18		25	12	6	7	41	27	48.00	1995–96	2013–14	
Inter Zaprešić †	26	19	3	4	73	27		27	14	12	1	48	16		53	33	15	5	121	43	62.26	1992	2019–20	
Istra	7	6	0	1	21	7		8	4	2	2	13	7		15	10	2	3	34	14	66.67	1992	1999–2000	
Istra 1961 †	23	15	4	4	51	18		20	10	5	5	30	18		43	25	9	9	81	36	58.14	2004–05	2019–20	
Kamen Ingrad ‡	9	7	1	1	23	3		8	3	1	4	10	10		17	10	2	5	33	13	58.82	2001–02	2006–07	^{[B]}
Karlovac ‡	3	2	0	1	4	3		3	0	2	1	2	3		6	2	2	2	6	6	33.33	2009–10	2011–12	^{[C]}
Lokomotiva †	19	11	7	1	28	14		17	9	2	6	24	16		36	20	9	7	52	29	55.56	2009–10	2019–20	
Lučko	1	0	0	1	1	2		1	1	0	0	3	0		2	1	0	1	4	2	50.00	2011–12	2011–12	
Marsonia	6	4	2	0	17	0		6	3	1	2	9	4		12	7	3	2	26	4	58.33	1994–95	2003–04	
Međimurje	5	4	1	0	12	4		7	3	4	0	14	8		12	7	5	0	26	12	58.33	2004–05	2009–10	
Mladost 127 ‡	3	2	1	0	6	2		3	1	2	0	3	2		6	3	3	0	9	4	50.00	1996–97	1998–99	^{[D]}
Neretva ‡	1	1	0	0	7	1		1	1	0	0	4	1		2	2	0	0	11	2	100.00	1994–95	1994–95	^{[E]}
Orijent	1	1	0	0	2	0		1	1	0	0	2	0		2	2	0	0	4	0	100.00	1996–97	1996–97	
Osijek †	44	32	10	2	97	37		44	14	11	19	54	61		88	46	21	21	151	98	52.27	1992	2019–20	
Pazinka	2	1	1	0	5	1		2	1	1	0	2	1		4	2	2	0	7	2	50.00	1992–93	1993–94	
Pomorac ‡	2	2	0	0	8	1		2	2	0	0	4	0		4	4	0	0	12	1	100.00	2001–02	2002–03	^{[F]}
Primorac	2	2	0	0	6	1		2	2	0	0	3	0		4	4	0	0	9	1	100.00	1993–94	1994–95	
Radnik (VG) ‡	2	2	0	0	13	1		2	2	0	0	5	1		4	4	0	0	18	2	100.00	1992–93	1993–94	^{[G]}
Rijeka †	41	18	12	11	69	52		42	13	12	17	43	55		83	31	24	28	112	107	37.35	1992	2019–20	
Rudeš	4	3	0	1	9	4		4	3	0	1	13	4		8	6	0	2	22	8	75.00	2017–18	2018–19	
Samobor	1	1	0	0	2	1		1	1	0	0	2	0		2	2	0	0	4	1	100.00	1997–98	1997–98	
Segesta	5	4	1	0	11	2		5	1	4	0	5	4		10	5	5	0	16	6	50.00	1992–93	1996–97	
Slaven Belupo †	35	27	7	1	71	16		33	9	15	9	34	35		68	36	22	10	105	51	52.94	1997–98	2019–20	
RNK Split	11	6	4	1	15	7		12	5	6	1	15	8		23	11	10	2	30	15	47.83	2010–11	2016–17	
Šibenik	21	16	3	2	39	12		19	13	4	2	33	15		40	29	7	4	72	27	72.50	1992	2011–12	
TŠK Topolovac	1	1	0	0	4	0		1	1	0	0	5	2		2	2	0	0	9	2	100.00	2001–02	2001–02	
Varaždin (1931–2015)	31	24	5	2	69	17		29	15	5	9	46	34		60	39	10	11	115	51	65.00	1992	2011–12	
Varaždin (2012) †	1	1	0	0	2	0		2	2	0	0	6	0		3	3	0	0	8	0	100.00	2019–20	2019–20	
Vukovar '91 ‡	2	2	0	0	6	0	1	1	0	0	2	0	3	3	0	0	8	0	100.00	1999–2000	1999–2000	^{[H]}		
Zadar	23	20	1	2	68	16	26	14	8	4	50	25	49	34	9	6	118	41	69.39	1992	2014–15			
NK Zagreb	34	29	1	4	77	25	31	11	6	15	46	51	66	40	7	19	123	76	60.61	1992	2015–16			

== Notes ==
A. Croatia Sesvete went bankrupt during the 2011–12 season, the following season a new club by the name Croatia Prigorje was registered and entered Zagreb county league.
B. Kamen Ingrad fell into financial difficulties after 2007–08 season and were dissolved in 2008.
C. Karlovac went bankrupt following the 2011–12 season, the following season a new club by the name Karlovac 1919 was registered and entered Karlovac county league.
D. Mladost 127 went bankrupt during the 1999–2000 season, new successor club by the name Suhopolje was founded later.
E. Neretva fell into financial difficulties during the 2016–17 season and in May 2017, the club stepped out from Treća HNL South and were dissolved.
F. Pomorac fell into financial difficulties during the 2013–14 season and in October 2014, the club stepped out from Druga HNL and were dissolved.
G. Radnik Velika Gorica merged with local club Polet Buševec in summer 2009, and formed a new club by the name Gorica.
H. Vukovar '91 fell into financial difficulties during the 2011–12 season and in January 2012, the club stepped out from Treća HNL East and were dissolved. A new club by the name Vukovar 1991 was registered and entered the Osijek-Vinkovci intercounty league the following season.
