= Alen Petrović =

Croatian footballer

Personal information
- Full name: Alen Petrović
- Date of birth: 5 November 1969 (age 57)
- Place of birth: Osijek, SR Croatia, SFR Yugoslavia
- Height: 1.86 m (6 ft 1 in)
- Position: Defender

Senior career*
Years	Team	Apps	(Gls)
1989–1994	Osijek	113	(32)
1994–1995	Belenenses	27	(1)
1995–1998	Croatia Zagreb	40	(4)
1998–1999	VfL Bochum	7	(0)
1999–2000	Slaven Belupo	12	(1)
2000–2001	Osijek	6	(1)
Total		215	(39)

International career
1990	Yugoslavia U21		
Medal record
Representing Yugoslavia
Silver medal – second place	UEFA U-21 Euro	1990
- * Club domestic league appearances and goals

Alen Petrović (born 5 November 1969) is a Croatian former football defender and sporting director.

He spent most of his career in Croatia's Prva HNL top-level league, with the exception of two season-long stints at Portuguese side C.F. Os Belenenses and Germany's VfL Bochum.

== Career ==
Petrović's professional debut came in the 1989–90 Yugoslav First League for the Croatian side NK Osijek, where he immediately established himself as a regular member of the starting eleven. After spending five seasons with Osijek and one season at Belenenses in Portugal he was picked up by the Croatian powerhouse NK Dinamo Zagreb (at the time known as "Croatia Zagreb") in 1995.

His time at Croatia proved to be very successful as the squad won three consecutive domestic Doubles between 1996 and 1998 and reached the 1997–98 UEFA Cup Round of 16 in which they were knocked out by Atlético Madrid 2–1 on aggregate. In 1998, he tried his luck abroad once again and spent a season with VfL Bochum in Germany but he never managed to break into the first team – he appeared in only seven games for Bochum in the 1998–99 Bundesliga before the club was relegated from top level at the end of season. He then returned to Croatia and had stints with NK Slaven Belupo and NK Osijek before retirement.

Shortly after retiring he was appointed director of football at NK Osijek in June 2005, a post he held until his contract was terminated by mutual consent in August 2009.

He spent his second period as sporting director in NK Osijek from February 2016 to September 2020. He has been the longest-running sporting director of NK Osijek since the HNL was founded.

From his work in NK Osijek he is well known for his ability to sign players for low-cost, then later selling them at great profit to Europe's elite clubs, all whilst NK Osijek continued to advance domestically and compete in UEFA Europa league. During his stay, he manage to hire quality players and achieve record sales and ensure cash flow through record transfers (the money spent on arrivals increased sevenfold after the players were sold). He also helped produce many players which would later play in A national teams like : Barišić, Škorić, Marić, Ivušić (Croatia), Ejupi (Macedonia), Kleinheisler (Hungary), Ndockyt (Congo) and U21 national team: Šutalo, Žaper, Beljo (Croatia).

He hired players from clubs such as Dinamo Zagreb, Olympiacos, Getafe, Alaves, Anderlecht and the players were sold to clubs that are at the top of their leagues: Atalanta, Glasgow Rangers, FC Copenhagen, Rapid Vienna, SC Braga, FC Monza. Many of the players he signed have increased their value, such as his latest signing Mierez, who became the best goal scorer of the league and whose price is now estimated around 10M euros.

== Career statistics ==
Appearances and goals by club, season and competition
Club	Season	League			Cup		Total	
Club	Season	Division	Apps	Goals	Apps	Goals	Apps	Goals
Osijek	1989–90	First League	4	0				
Osijek	1990–91	First League	25	4				
Osijek	1992	Prva HNL	22	5				
Osijek	1992–93	Prva HNL	30	10				
Osijek	1993–94	Prva HNL	32	13				
Osijek	Total		113	32				
Belenenses	1994–95	Primeira Liga	27	1				
Croatia Zagreb	1995–96	Prva HNL	24	3				
Croatia Zagreb	1996–97	Prva HNL	14	1				
Croatia Zagreb	1997–98	Prva HNL	2	0				
Croatia Zagreb	Total		40	4				
VfL Bochum	1998–99	Bundesliga	7	0	2	2	9	2
Slaven Belupo	1999–00	Prva HNL	12	1				
Osijek	2000–01	Prva HNL	6	1				
Career total			215	39				
