= Miljenko Mumlek =

Croatian former footballer (born 1972)

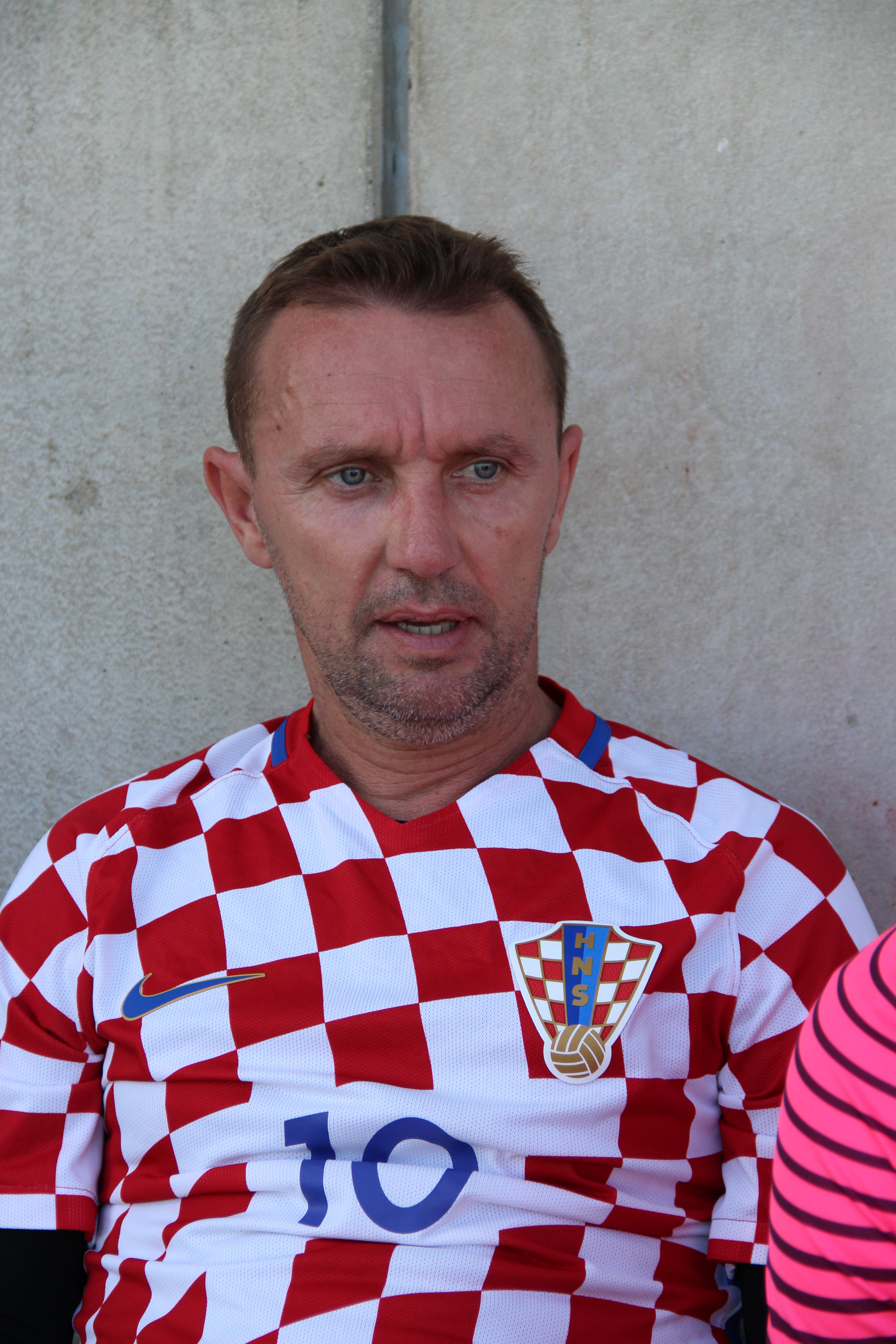

Personal information
- Date of birth: 21 November 1972 (age 53)
- Place of birth: Varaždin, SFR Yugoslavia
- Height: 1.78 m (5 ft 10 in)
- Position: Midfielder

Senior career*
Years	Team	Apps	(Gls)
1992–1999	Varteks	207	(52)
1999–2000	Dinamo Zagreb	9	(5)
2000–2003	Varteks	51	(11)
2003–2005	Standard Liège	33	(2)
2005–2007	Slaven Belupo	48	(12)
2007–2010	Varteks	83	(27)
	Varteks total	341	(90)

International career^{‡}
1993	Croatia U21	1	(0)
1999	Croatia B	1	(0)
1994–2003	Croatia	8	(1)

Managerial career
- 2018: Varaždin
- * Club domestic league appearances and goals as of 13 May 2010 ‡ National team caps and goals as of 12 February 2003

Miljenko Mumlek (born 21 November 1972 in Varaždin) is a Croatian former footballer who played as a midfielder until being sentenced to prison for match fixing. He later returned as a football team manager for one season.

== Club career ==
Born in Varaždin, Mumlek started his professional career in his hometown with NK Varteks in early 1992 and went on to establish himself as one of the club's key players during the 1990s. In the 1998–99 season, he was an important part of the Varteks team that reached the quarter-finals of the now-defunct UEFA Cup Winners' Cup, appearing in all of the six matches played by the team in the competition that season, as well as scoring three goals in the two matches against SC Heerenveen in the second round of the competition. After grabbing a 5–4 aggregate win against the Dutch side in the extra time of the second leg at home in Varaždin, Varteks faced RCD Mallorca in the quarter-finals, losing the return leg 3–1 after a goalless draw at home in the first leg.

In the summer of 1999, Mumlek left Varteks for Dinamo Zagreb (then known as Croatia Zagreb) and went on to make four appearances for the club in the UEFA Champions League group stage, appearing in both home and away fixtures against Manchester United and Olympique de Marseille before Dinamo were knocked out of the competition after finishing 4th out of 4 teams in their group, one point behind the 3rd-place Sturm Graz. Mumlek made just nine appearances for Dinamo in the Croatian First League and went on to return to Varteks in January 2000, staying with the club until August 2003, when he moved to Belgian side Standard Liège, which was the only time during his career that he had played his club football outside Croatia.

After spending two seasons with the Belgian side, he returned to Croatia in July 2005 and signed with Slaven Belupo. In June 2007, he returned to Varteks for his third spell with the club.

In June 2010, he was one of the players arrested under allegations of being involved in match fixing in the Croatian First League during the 2009–10 season. According to the club's chairman, he had been in negotiations to sign a one-year contract extension with Varteks at the time. He remained in custody until 16 July 2010. After that, the Croatian Football Federation allowed him to return to training and play in competitive matches. However, as his contract with Varteks (meanwhile renamed NK Varaždin) expired on 30 June 2010, he was without a club. NK Varaždin stated that they would wait to see whether or not there would be any legal action taken against him before possibly considering to offer him a new contract.

On 13 December 2011, Mumlek was sentenced to 7 months of prison due to his involvement in match fixing.

NK Varaždin folded in 2015, and in 2018 Mulmek served as manager of a different NK Varaždin, a team which played in the same Stadion Varteks where he had spent many years as a player.

== International career ==
Mumlek made his international debut with the Croatia national under-21 football team, making his only appearance for the team in a friendly match against Slovenia on 17 March 1993 in Varaždin. Later, he also occasionally played for the Croatia national team. He won a total of 8 full international caps and scored one goal for the national team, although all of his international appearances came in friendly matches.

He made his full international debut on 20 April 1994 in a 4–1 defeat for Croatia against Slovakia in Bratislava, coming on as a half-time substitute for Dean Računica. In his second international appearance, against Israel in Tel Aviv on 17 August 1994, he scored the final goal in a 4–0 win for Croatia. His third international appearance came in 1997 at the Kirin Cup, a minor international tournament in Japan, where he appeared as a substitute in a 1–1 draw against Turkey.

Following the Kirin Cup tournament, he remained uncapped for over four years, apart from appearing for Croatia B in a friendly match against France on 19 January 1999. In November 2001, he made his comeback to the full international side during a two-match tour in South Korea, where he appeared in both of Croatia's friendlies against the home side. After that, he won another three international caps, with his final international appearance coming on 12 February 2003 in a goalless draw against Poland in Split.

=== International goal ===
Goal	Date	Venue	Opponent	Score	Result	Competition
01	17 August 1994	Tel Aviv, Israel	Israel	0 – 4	0 – 4	Friendly

=== Club ===
Club performance			League		Cup		Continental		Total	
Season	Club	League	Apps	Goals	Apps	Goals	Apps	Goals	Apps	Goals
Croatia			League		Cup		Europe		Total	
1992	NK Varteks	Prva HNL	18	2	—		—		18	2
1992–93	NK Varteks	Prva HNL	25	3	1	0	—		26	3
1993–94	NK Varteks	Prva HNL	28	6	6	2	—		34	8
1994–95	NK Varteks	Prva HNL	27	4	7	0	—		34	4
1995–96	NK Varteks	Prva HNL	26	4	7	0	—		33	4
1996–97	NK Varteks	Prva HNL	29	12	4	4	3	2	36	18
1997–98	NK Varteks	Prva HNL	25	5	6	0	—		31	5
1998–99	NK Varteks	Prva HNL	25	13	3	0	6	3	34	16
1999–00	NK Varteks	Prva HNL	3	0	3	0	6	5	12	5
1999–00	Dinamo Zagreb	Prva HNL	9	5	1	1	4	0	14	6
2000–01	NK Varteks	Prva HNL	—		—		—		0	0
2001–02	NK Varteks	Prva HNL	25	6	7	0	6	2	38	8
2002–03	NK Varteks	Prva HNL	23	5	3	2	4	2	30	9
2003–04	NK Varteks	Prva HNL	4	1	—		2	2	6	1
Belgium			League		Cup		Europe		Total	
2003–04	Standard Liège	Belgian Pro League	24	2	1	0	—		25	2
2004–05	Standard Liège	Belgian Pro League	9	0	0	0	4	0	13	0
Croatia			League		Cup		Europe		Total	
2005–06	Slaven Belupo	Prva HNL	19	7	4	2	—		23	9
2006–07	Slaven Belupo	Prva HNL	29	6	7	4	—		36	10
2007–08	NK Varteks	Prva HNL	25	9	3	2	—		28	11
2008–09	NK Varteks	Prva HNL	29	7	2	1	—		31	8
2009–10	NK Varteks	Prva HNL	29	11	6	2	—		35	13
Total	Croatia		398	106	68	20	33	16	499	142
Total	Belgium		33	2	1	0	4	0	38	2
Total	Career total		431	108	69	20	37	16	537	144

== Honours ==
Dinamo Zagreb

- Prva HNL: 1999–00

Individual

- SN Yellow Shirt award: 1999
