= Goran Jurić =

Croatian footballer

Personal information
- Full name: Goran Jurić
- Date of birth: 5 February 1963 (age 63)
- Place of birth: Mostar, SR Bosnia and Herzegovina, Yugoslavia
- Height: 1.78 m (5 ft 10 in)
- Position: Defender

Senior career*
Years	Team	Apps	(Gls)
1982–1987	Velež Mostar	130	(1)
1987–1990	Red Star Belgrade	78	(0)
1991–1993	Celta Vigo	76	(1)
1993–2000	Croatia Zagreb	85	(0)
1995–1996	→ Hrvatski Dragovoljac (loan)	9	(0)
1996	→ NK Zagreb (loan)	10	(0)
2000	Yokohama F. Marinos	9	(0)
2001	NK Zagreb	5	(0)
Total		402	(2)

International career
1988–1989	Yugoslavia	4	(0)
1997–1999	Croatia	16	(0)
Medal record
Representing Croatia
Bronze medal – third place	FIFA World Cup	1998
- * Club domestic league appearances and goals

Goran "Goca" Jurić (born 5 February 1963) is a Croatian former professional footballer who played as a defender.

During his career, he played for Velež Mostar, Red Star Belgrade, Celta Vigo, Croatia Zagreb, Yokohama F. Marinos, and NK Zagreb. He earned 4 caps for the Yugoslavia national football team in 1988, and 16 caps for the Croatia national football team.

== Club career ==
In 1993 he left Celta Vigo after being diagnosed with Type 1 Diabetes.

== International career ==
He made his debut for Yugoslavia in a September 1988 friendly match away against Spain. After the break-up of the country, he started to represent Croatia, playing his first game for them in April 1997. He was a non-playing member of the squad for the 1998 FIFA World Cup, where Croatia finished third. His final international was an October 1999 European Championship qualification match against FR Yugoslavia.

== Career statistics ==
=== Club ===
Club performance			League	
Season	Club	League	Apps	Goals
Yugoslavia			League	
1982/83	Velež Mostar	First League	11	0
1983/84	Velež Mostar	First League	32	1
1984/85	Velež Mostar	First League	32	0
1985/86	Velež Mostar	First League	30	0
1986/87	Velež Mostar	First League	25	0
1987/88	Red Star Belgrade	First League	23	0
1988/89	Red Star Belgrade	First League	26	0
1989/90	Red Star Belgrade	First League	21	0
1990/91	Red Star Belgrade	First League	8	0
Spain			League	
1990/91	Celta Vigo	Segunda División	14	0
1991/92	Celta Vigo	Segunda División	30	1
1992/93	Celta Vigo	La Liga	32	0
Croatia			League	
1995/96	Croatia Zagreb	Prva HNL	1	0
1995/96	Hrvatski Dragovoljac	Prva HNL	9	0
1996/97	Zagreb	Prva HNL	10	0
1996/97	Croatia Zagreb	Prva HNL	15	0
1997/98	Croatia Zagreb	Prva HNL	23	0
1998/99	Croatia Zagreb	Prva HNL	25	0
1999/00	Croatia Zagreb	Prva HNL	21	0
Japan			League	
2000	Yokohama F. Marinos	J1 League	9	0
Croatia			League	
2000/01	Zagreb	Prva HNL	5	0
Country	Yugoslavia		208	1
Country	Spain		76	1
Country	Croatia		109	0
Country	Japan		9	0
Total			402	2

=== International ===
Yugoslavia national team
Year	Apps	Goals
1988	3	0
1989	1	0
Total	4	0

Croatia national team
Year	Apps	Goals
1997	8	0
1998	3	0
1999	5	0
Total	16	0

== Honours ==
=== Club ===
Velež Mostar

- Yugoslav Cup: 1985–86

Red Star Belgrade

- Yugoslav First League: 1987–88, 1989–90, 1990–91
- Yugoslav Cup: 1989–90
- European Cup: 1990–91

Celta de Vigo

- Segunda División: 1991–92

Dinamo Zagreb

- Croatian First League: 1996–97, 1997–98, 1998–99, 1999–2000
- Croatian Cup: 1996–97, 1997–98

=== Individual ===
Croatia

- FIFA World Cup Third place: 1998

=== Orders ===
- Order of the Croatian Interlace - 1998
