= Frane Vojković =

Croatian footballer

Personal information
- Date of birth: 20 December 1996 (age 29)
- Place of birth: Split, Croatia
- Height: 1.82 m (6 ft 0 in)
- Position: Attacking midfielder

Youth career
- 2006–2015: Hajduk Split

Senior career*
Years	Team	Apps	(Gls)
2015–2019	Hajduk Split	16	(0)
2015–2017	→ Hajduk II	16	(5)
2017–2018	→ Cibalia (loan)	9	(0)
2018	→ Rudeš (loan)	11	(0)
2019	→ Hajduk II	0	(0)
2019	Karpaty Lviv	12	(1)
2020–2021	Lokomotiva Zagreb	4	(0)

International career
2010	Croatia U14	2	(0)
2010–2011	Croatia U15	4	(0)
2012	Croatia U16	5	(1)
2011–2013	Croatia U17	17	(1)
2013	Croatia U18	1	(0)
2015	Croatia U19	2	(0)
2017	Croatia U21	1	(0)
- * Club domestic league appearances and goals as of 21:48, 3 October 2020 (UTC)

Frane Vojković (Croatian pronunciation: [frǎːne ʋǒːjkoʋitɕ]; born 20 December 1996) is a retired Croatian footballer who most recently played as an attacking midfielder for NK Lokomotiva Zagreb.

== Club career ==
=== Early years ===
Vojković joined the HNK Hajduk Split academy at the age of 6, and advanced through the ranks, playing for the national team in all the categories from U14 upwards. A precocious player, he made his U17 national team debut at the age of 15, becoming a first-team regular there, while, despite being born in the last days of 1996, he played for the '95 generation, helping it the national U17 championship. However, his career was brought to a halt by a string of serious injuries, making him miss every match between November 2013 and February 2015. Returning to football in early 2015, he played another two matches for the Croatia U19 team and two further matches for the third-tier reserves of Hajduk, before yet another injury in March 2015.

=== HNK Hajduk Split ===
==== 2016–17 season ====
He returned to training in the winter of 2015/16, still impressing enough to receive a 3.5-year long professional contract, despite effectively being forced out of the game for more than two years. He made his first-team debut in the 27.2.2016 1–0 away loss against HNK Rijeka, coming it at half-time for Toma Bašić

=== HNK Cibalia Vinkovci ===
==== 2017–18 season ====
In September 2017, Vojković was loaned to HNK Cibalia after being given little chance at Hajduk Split. During his time at Cibalia he had just few appearances mostly because of injuries.

=== NK Rudeš ===
==== 2018–19 season ====
In July 2018, Vojković was once again loaned to Prva HNL club NK Rudeš along with Anthony Kalik.

== International career ==
Frane has represented Croatia in all categories from U14 upwards. He made his U17 national team debut at the age of 15, becoming a first-team regular there, while, despite being born in the last days of 1996, he played for the '95 generation, helping it the national U17 championship.

== Career statistics ==
=== Club ===
As of 14 August 2018

Club	Season	League	Appearances	Goals	Assists
NK Rudes (loan)	2018-19	Hrvatski Prva Liga	3	0	0
HNK Cibalia Vinkovci (loan)	2017-18	Hrvatski Prva Liga	9	0	2
HNK Hajduk Split	2016-17	Hrvatski Prva Liga	6	0	0
HNK Hajduk Split	2015-16	Hrvatski Prva Liga	10	0	0

=== International ===
As of 13 November 2017

Croatia National Team
Year	Category	Appearances	Goals
2010	U-14	2	0
2011	U-15	4	0
2012	U-16	5	1
2013	U-17	17	1
2014	U-18	1	0
2015	U-19	2	0
2017	U-21	1	0

== Personal life ==
Frane is one of three sons born to Ivan and Sanda Vojković. Frane has an older brother, Mirko, who is one year older and younger brother Josip who was born in 1998.

Vojkovic wears number 88 on the back of his playing jersey in honour of his grandfather Simun Vojkovic who died at the age of 88
