= Croatian Football League =

Association football league in Croatia

SuperSport HNL
- Organising body: Croatian Football Federation
- Founded: 1992; 34 years ago
- Country: Croatia
- Confederation: UEFA
- Number of clubs: 10
- Level on pyramid: 1
- Relegation to: Prva NL
- Domestic cup(s): Croatian Cup; Croatian Super Cup
- International cup(s): UEFA Champions League; UEFA Europa League; UEFA Conference League
- Current champions: Dinamo Zagreb (26th title) (2025–26)
- Most championships: Dinamo Zagreb (26 titles)
- Most appearances: Jakov Surać (453)
- Top scorer: Davor Vugrinec (146)
- Broadcasters: T-Hrvatski Telekom (MAX Sport); HRT
- Sponsor: SuperSport
- Website: hnl.hr (in Croatian)
- Current: 2026–27 Croatian Football League

The Croatian Football League (Croatian: Hrvatska nogometna liga, pronounced [xř̩ʋaːtskaː nôɡomeːtnaː lǐːɡa]), abbreviated as HNL and also known for sponsorship reasons as the SuperSport HNL, is a professional association football league in Croatia and the highest level of the Croatian football league system. It is considered top-division by UEFA with its member clubs contesting the Champions League, Europa League, and Conference League internationally.

The HNL comprises 10 teams and operates on a system of promotion and relegation with the First Football League (Prva NL). Seasons run from August to May. Games are played on Fridays, Saturdays and Sundays, with a focus on Saturdays. The league's teams compete for the Croatian Cup and the Croatian Super Cup. The former is a season-long knockout tournament while the latter is contested between the league champions and Croatian Cup winners, with a possible double title.

The "Big Four" clubs are Dinamo Zagreb, Hajduk Split, Rijeka, and Osijek, all four of which have never been relegated. Dinamo Zagreb is the only Croatian club to win a major European title (1967) and leads the nation in domestic championship titles (26). The HNL is the country's most popular sports league by attendance, viewership, and revenue. It has been a perennial feeder league into the Big Five football leagues in Europe.

== Overview ==
The league was formed in 1991, following the independence of Croatia and the creation of a separate Croatian league from the Yugoslav First League. This newly formed league was operated by the Croatian Football Federation. Since its formation, the league went through many changes in its system and number of participating clubs. In the first three seasons two points were awarded for a win, from 1994–95 season this was changed to three points. Each season starts in late July or early August and ends in May, with a two-month hiatus between December and February. Currently, there are ten teams participating in the league.

The first season started in February 1992 and ended in June 1992. A total of twelve clubs contested the league and at the end of the season no teams were relegated as it was decided that the league would expand to 16 clubs for the following season. This was followed by another expansion to 18 teams in 1993–94 season, highest number of participating teams in Prva HNL history. The following season, number of teams was reduced again to 16. 1995–96 Prva HNL was the first season to feature separate A- and B- leagues, with a complicated two-stage format to the season. Twelve teams contested the A league, while the B league, formally the second level, consisted of ten teams. In March, the teams were split into three groups: Championship group (consisting of first five teams from A league and the first-placed team of the B league), A play-off group (remaining teams from A league and the second-placed team of the B league) and B play-off group (remaining teams from B league). The first two teams of the B play-off group were placed in the A league for the following season, which featured 16 teams in both A and B league. In the 1997–98 Prva HNL, the league consisted of 12 team and a new format was used. In March, teams were split into two groups of six, Championship and Relegation group, with 50% of their points taken to this phase of the competition. At the end of the season, the last team was directly relegated to the Druga HNL and the second-last team went in the relegation play-off, a two-legged tie against the second-placed team from the Druga HNL. This system was used for two seasons, followed by 1999–2000 Prva HNL where each club playing every other club three times for a total of 33 rounds. Next season featured a return of Championship and Relegation group system but without 50% points cutoff. This system was used until 2005–06 season, with a brief expansion to 16 teams in 2001–02 season. The 2006–07 season brought back a 33 rounds system previously used in 1999–2000 Prva HNL. In the 2009–10 season, the league was expanded to 16 teams. This lasted for three seasons, and in the 2012–13 Prva HNL season, the league was contested by 12 teams playing a total of 33 rounds. From the 2013–14 Prva HNL season, number of teams was reduced to ten.

The league's main sponsor is T-Hrvatski Telekom, owned by the German telecommunications firm Deutsche Telekom. At the end of the 2014–15 season, the Croatian First League was ranked 17th in Europe. The champions of the 2015–16 Croatian First Football League will qualify for the second qualifying round of the UEFA Champions League, the runners-up will qualify for the second qualifying round of UEFA Europa League, while the third-placed team will qualify for the first qualifying round of UEFA Europa League. The winners of the 2015–16 Croatian Football Cup will qualify for the third qualifying round of UEFA Europa League.

== Clubs ==
The following ten clubs compete in the 2025-26 Croatian Football League season, the 36th season since the league's establishment.

Four of the ten clubs currently competing in the Croatian top level also had spells in the Yugoslav First League played from 1945 to 1991 before Croatian clubs abandoned the competition (Dinamo Zagreb, Hajduk Split, Lokomotiva, Osijek, Rijeka). Four other Croatian clubs which had appeared in the top Yugoslav league (Cibalia, RNK Split, NK Zagreb and Trešnjevka) are currently playing in Croatian lower levels.

As of 2025, only four of the 12 founding members of the Croatian league have never been relegated: Dinamo Zagreb, Hajduk Split, Osijek and Rijeka.

Club	Position in 2024–25	First season in top division	Number of seasons in top division	Number of seasons in 1. HNL	First season of current spell in top division	Best top level result	Titles total (most recent)
Dinamo Zagreb ‡	2nd	1946–47	80	35	1946–47	1st	29 (2023–24)^{nb1}
Gorica	9th	2018–19	8	8	2018–19	5th	—N/a
Hajduk Split ‡	3rd	1923	97	35	1923	1st	15 (2004–05)^{nb2}
Istra 1961	6th	2004–05	20	20	2009–10	5th	—N/a
Lokomotiva	8th	1946–47	26	17	2009–10	2nd	—N/a
Osijek ‡	7th	1953–54	51	35	1981–82	2nd	—N/a
Rijeka ‡	1st	1946–47	64	35	1974–75	1st	2 (2024–25)
Slaven Belupo	5th	1997–98	30	30	1997–98	2nd	—N/a
Varaždin	4th	2019–20	6	6	2019–20	4th	—N/a
Vukovar 1991	1st in 1. NL	2025–26	0	0	2025–26	TBA	—N/a

† – One of the 12 founding members of the league in the inaugural 1992 season.
‡ – Appeared in all 33 seasons up to and including the current 2025–26 season.
nb1 – Dinamo Zagreb tally includes four Yugoslav and 25 Croatian league titles.
nb2 – Hajduk Split tally includes nine Yugoslav and six Croatian league titles.

== Prva HNL teams in European competitions ==
The breakup of Yugoslavia saw top flight league split into several smaller ones. This meant separation of Croatian football association from the Football Association of Yugoslavia and launch of their own football league. Prva HNL saw its first edition in 1992. Hajduk Split and HAŠK Građanski took part in European competitions on account of qualification secured at the end of the 1990–91 Yugoslav football season: HAŠK Građanski were runners-up in the 1990–91 Yugoslav First League and qualified for 1991–92 UEFA Cup while Hajduk Split won the 1990–91 Yugoslav Cup and entered 1991–92 European Cup Winners' Cup. Due to war both clubs had to host their European matches abroad, in Austria.

Affected by the ongoing war in Croatia, the first Prva HNL season was held over the course of a single calendar year, from February to June 1992. Neither Hajduk Split (1992 Croatian champions) nor Inker Zaprešić (1992 Croatian Cup winners) could enter European competitions the following 1992–93 season as the Croatian Football Federation, the league's governing body, wasn't yet recognized by UEFA and officially became its affiliate as late as June 1993.

Eight times in history have HNL teams entered the group stages of UEFA Champions League. In the 1994–95 season, Hajduk Split eliminated Legia Warsaw in the qualifying round and entered the group stage. They advanced to quarterfinals as group runners-up behind Benfica but were eliminated by eventual winners Ajax. In the 1998–99 season, Croatia Zagreb qualified over Celtic and finished in second place behind Olympiacos, but failed to advance as only first place teams and two best runners-up went through. The following season, Croatia also entered the group stage after eliminating MTK Budapest in the third qualifying round. Drawn in the group with Manchester United, Olympique Marseille and Sturm Graz, they finished last, winning only against Sturm and drawing away at Manchester and Marseille. In the 2011–12 season, Dinamo Zagreb advanced through three qualifying rounds and were drawn in the group with Real Madrid, Lyon and Ajax. The following season, Dinamo Zagreb also advanced to the group stages and was drawn in the group with Dynamo Kyiv, Paris Saint-Germain and Porto. They lost five group matches, drawing with Dynamo Kyiv in the last round. In the 2015-16 season, Dinamo Zagreb entered the group stage and recorded notable win 2–1 over Arsenal. Next season, 2016-17, another qualification followed. Latest entry to the group stage was in 2019-20 where Dinamo Zagreb finished fourth behind Manchester City, Atalanta and Shakhtar with 2 draws vs Shakhtar and a 4–0 win over Atalanta, with controversial refereeing decisions in both draws — a win in either would have sent them through to the Round of 16 as runners-up.

== Former names ==
Since 2003, the league has been named after its main sponsor, giving it the following names (Logos see below):

- 2003–2007 – Prva HNL Ožujsko (Sponsored by Zagrebačka pivovara and their Ožujsko beer brand.)
- 2007–2011 – T-Com Prva HNL (Sponsored by T-Hrvatski Telekom, a subsidiary of Deutsche Telekom.)
- 2011–2017 – MAXtv Prva liga (Sponsored by T-Hrvatski Telekom, a subsidiary of Deutsche Telekom.)
- 2017–2022 – Hrvatski Telekom Prva liga / HT Prva liga (Sponsored by T-Hrvatski Telekom, a subsidiary of Deutsche Telekom.)
- 2022–present – SuperSport Hrvatska nogometna liga / SuperSport HNL (Sponsored by bookmaker SuperSport)

== UEFA rankings ==
Europe's top football body, the UEFA, ranks national leagues every year according to coefficients calculated based on each nation's clubs results in international competitions. The ranking takes into account results over the previous five seasons to determine the nation's European quota for the following season, i.e. how many berths in European competitions is assigned to clubs from each of UEFA's 55 member associations.

UEFA also maintains a separate club ranking, based on each club's international results, used to determine seeds in draws for the UEFA Champions League and UEFA Europa League. This is calculated through a combination of each club's results as well as the ranking of its national league. As of 2026, Dinamo Zagreb is the top rated Croatian club, ranked 55th in Europe.

=== Country ===
As of 16 April 2026

Rank	Competition	Points
18	(Scotland) Scottish Premiership	32.050
19	(Sweden) Allsvenskan	29.625
20	(Croatia) Croatian Football League	28.156
21	(Israel) Israeli Premier League	27.500
22	(Hungary) Nemzeti Bajnokság I	27.187

Source: Bert Kassies' website Archived 12 April 2022 at the Wayback Machine (country rankings); last updated 29 May 2022

=== Club ===
As of 8 February 2025

2025 rank	2021 rank	Team	2025 club pts	2025 nation pts
39	33	Dinamo Zagreb	56.000	5.405
124	113	Rijeka	12.000	5.405
156	137	Hajduk Split	10.000	5.405
156	160	Osijek	9.000	5.405
265	225	Lokomotiva	2.000	5.405

Source: Bert Kassies' website Archived 12 April 2022 at the Wayback Machine (team rankings); last updated 29 May 2022

== Media coverage ==
In past, only one match in each round (derby match) was broadcast on television. In the 2008–09 season there were some changes. Croatian national TV Network (HRT) started the new TV show Volim Nogomet (I Love Football), made in association with league's main sponsor T-Com. In the show, five matches were broadcast combined on Sunday afternoons, while the derby match was on program at 20:15 CET, so viewers could watch all the matches. There were also experts in the studio, commenting on matches and other things non-related to football. Main initiator of the project was famous Croatian football player and then president of T-Com 1. HNL organisation Igor Štimac. Most of the clubs weren't satisfied with the scheduling of fixtures and demanded a move from Sunday afternoon to Saturday evening. This was done at the start of the following season and the only match played on Sunday was the derby match. However, during the mid-season project was cancelled and the old system with one broadcast per round was returned.

In November 2010, broadcasting rights were sold to marketing agency Digitel Komunikacije for a period of five years, beginning with 2011–12 season. After the negotiations fell through with public broadcasting television HRT, which covered Prva HNL for the past twenty seasons, Digitel signed a deal with Hrvatski Telekom. The matches were broadcast on Arenasport, a cable television network with five channels, available to subscribers of MAXtv, IPTV solution from T-HT subsidiary T-Com. All matches were broadcast live every week on Arenasport. All highlights are displayed on Sunday evening on RTL 2 and HRT 2.

From 2022–23 season the matches are broadcasting on the Hrvatski Telekom channels MAX Sport, while the one match per round broadcasting on the Croatian Radiotelevision (HRT), again after 11 years (from September 2022, mainly on Sunday at 15:00 CET). For the other Ex-Yugoslav republics the league still broadcasting on Arena Sport. From January 2025, Hajduk Split's matches are broadcasting on the club's cable channel Hajduk Digital TV (HDTV).

== Attendance ==
Season	Total attendance	Number of matches	Average attendance per match	Ref
1992	376,435	132	2,896	
1992–93	1,006,350	240	4,264	
1993–94	851,600	306	2,820	
1994–95	879,400	240	3,664	
1995–96	940,270	364	2,612	
1996–97	687,950	240	2,903	
1997–98	684,400	192	3,602	
1998–99	745,728	192	3,884	
1999–00	515,790	198	2,605	
2000–01	546,624	192	2,847	
2001–02	573,840	240	2,391	
2002–03	635,520	192	3,310	
2003–04	570,816	192	2,973	
2004–05	541,440	192	2,820	
2005–06	633,792	192	3,301	
2006–07	622,908	198	3,146	
2007–08	616,572	198	3,114	
2008–09	617,050	198	3,116	
2009–10	500,002	240	2,083	
2010–11	458,746	240	1,911	
2011–12	482,002	240	2,087	
2012–13	497,188	198	2,511	
2013–14	573,070	180	3,202	
2014–15	489,159	180	2,733	
2015–16	442,952	180	2,461	
2016–17	492,041	180	2,734	
2017–18	530,638	180	2,948	
2018–19	478,760	180	2,660	
2019–20	510,674	180	2,837	
2020–21	26,509	180	147	
2021–22	502,012	180	2,789	
2022–23	735,219	180	4,085	
2023–24	956,128	180	5,371	
2024–25	1,020,397	180	5,669	
2025–26	945,330	180	5,252	

== Champions ==
Key

†	League champions also won the Croatian Football Cup, they completed the domestic Double
+	Player received award in front of Mijo Caktaš and Mirko Marić based on least playing minutes

Season	Champions (titles)	Runners-up	Third place	Top league scorer		
Season	Champions (titles)	Runners-up	Third place	Player (Club)	Nat.	Goals
1992	Hajduk Split (1)	NK Zagreb	Osijek	Ardian Kozniku (Hajduk Split)	KOS	12
1992–93	Croatia Zagreb (1)	Hajduk Split	NK Zagreb	Goran Vlaović (Croatia Zagreb)	CRO	23
1993–94	Hajduk Split (2)	NK Zagreb	Croatia Zagreb	Goran Vlaović (Croatia Zagreb)	CRO	29
1994–95	Hajduk Split (3) †	Croatia Zagreb	Osijek	Robert Špehar (Osijek)	CRO	23
1995–96	Croatia Zagreb (2) †	Hajduk Split	Varteks	Igor Cvitanović (Croatia Zagreb)	CRO	19
1996–97	Croatia Zagreb (3) †	Hajduk Split	Hrvatski Dragovoljac	Igor Cvitanović (Croatia Zagreb)	CRO	20
1997–98	Croatia Zagreb (4) †	Hajduk Split	Osijek	Mate Baturina (NK Zagreb)	CRO	18
1998–99	Croatia Zagreb (5)	Rijeka	Hajduk Split	Joško Popović (Šibenik)	CRO	21
1999–2000	Dinamo Zagreb (6)	Hajduk Split	Osijek	Tomo Šokota (Dinamo Zagreb)	CRO	21
2000–01	Hajduk Split (4)	Dinamo Zagreb	Osijek	Tomo Šokota (Dinamo Zagreb)	CRO	20
2001–02	NK Zagreb (1)	Hajduk Split	Dinamo Zagreb	Ivica Olić (NK Zagreb)	CRO	21
2002–03	Dinamo Zagreb (7)	Hajduk Split	Varteks	Ivica Olić (Dinamo Zagreb)	CRO	16
2003–04	Hajduk Split (5)	Dinamo Zagreb	Rijeka	Robert Špehar (Osijek)	CRO	18
2004–05	Hajduk Split (6)	Inter Zaprešić	NK Zagreb	Tomislav Erceg (Rijeka)	CRO	17
2005–06	Dinamo Zagreb (8)	Rijeka	Varteks	Ivan Bošnjak (Dinamo Zagreb)	CRO	22
2006–07	Dinamo Zagreb (9) †	Hajduk Split	NK Zagreb	Eduardo (Dinamo Zagreb)	CRO	34
2007–08	Dinamo Zagreb (10) †	Slaven Belupo	Osijek	Želimir Terkeš (Zadar)	BIH	21
2008–09	Dinamo Zagreb (11) †	Hajduk Split	Rijeka	Mario Mandžukić (Dinamo Zagreb)	CRO	16
2009–10	Dinamo Zagreb (12)	Hajduk Split	Cibalia	Davor Vugrinec (NK Zagreb)	CRO	18
2010–11	Dinamo Zagreb (13) †	Hajduk Split	RNK Split	Ivan Krstanović (NK Zagreb)	BIH	19
2011–12	Dinamo Zagreb (14) †	Hajduk Split	Slaven Belupo	Fatos Bećiraj (Dinamo Zagreb)	MNE	15
2012–13	Dinamo Zagreb (15)	Lokomotiva	Rijeka	Leon Benko (Rijeka)	CRO	19
2013–14	Dinamo Zagreb (16)	Rijeka	Hajduk Split	Duje Čop (Dinamo Zagreb)	CRO	22
2014–15	Dinamo Zagreb (17) †	Rijeka	Hajduk Split	Andrej Kramarić (Rijeka)	CRO	21
2015–16	Dinamo Zagreb (18) †	Rijeka	Hajduk Split	Ilija Nestorovski (Inter Zaprešić)	MKD	25
2016–17	Rijeka (1) †	Dinamo Zagreb	Hajduk Split	Márkó Futács (Hajduk Split)	HUN	18
2017–18	Dinamo Zagreb (19) †	Rijeka	Hajduk Split	El Arabi Hillel Soudani (Dinamo Zagreb)	ALG	17
2018–19	Dinamo Zagreb (20)	Rijeka	Osijek	Mijo Caktaš (Hajduk Split)	CRO	19
2019–20	Dinamo Zagreb (21)	Lokomotiva	Rijeka	Antonio Čolak ^{+} (Rijeka)	CRO	20
2020–21	Dinamo Zagreb (22) †	Osijek	Rijeka	Ramón Miérez (Osijek)	ARG	22
2021–22	Dinamo Zagreb (23)	Hajduk Split	Osijek	Marko Livaja (Hajduk Split)	CRO	28
2022–23	Dinamo Zagreb (24)	Hajduk Split	Osijek	Marko Livaja (Hajduk Split)	CRO	19
2023–24	Dinamo Zagreb (25) †	Rijeka	Hajduk Split	Ramón Miérez (Osijek)	ARG	19
2024–25	Rijeka (2) †	Dinamo Zagreb	Hajduk Split	Marko Livaja (Hajduk Split)	CRO	19
2025–26	Dinamo Zagreb (26)	Hajduk Split	Varaždin	Dion Drena Beljo (Dinamo Zagreb)	CRO	31

Notes on name changes:

- Dinamo Zagreb changed their name to "HAŠK Građanski" in June 1991 and then again in February 1993 to "Croatia Zagreb". They won five league titles and participated in the 1998–99 and 1999–2000 UEFA Champions League group stages carrying that name before reverting to "Dinamo Zagreb" mid-season in February 2000.
- Koprivnica-based Slaven Belupo were formerly known as "Slaven" until 1992. They were then known as "Slaven Bilokalnik" from 1992 to 1994 before adopting their current name in 1994 for sponsorship reasons, after a pharmaceutical company based in Koprivnica. Since UEFA does not recognize sponsored club names, the club is listed as "Slaven Koprivnica" in European competitions and on UEFA's official website.

== Performance by club ==
Titles won by club (%)
1. Dinamo Zagreb – 26 (74.3%)
2. Hajduk Split – 6 (17.1%)
3. Rijeka – 2 (5.70%)
4. Zagreb – 1 (2.90%)

Club	Champions	Runners-up	Third place	Last best place
Dinamo Zagreb	26	5	2	Champions 2025–26
Hajduk Split	6	15	8	Champions 2004–05
Rijeka	2	8	5	Champions 2024–25
NK Zagreb	1	2	3	Champions 2001–02
Lokomotiva	—	2	—	Runner-up 2019–20
Osijek	—	1	9	Runner-up 2020–21
Slaven Belupo	—	1	1	Runner-up 2007–08
Inter Zaprešić	—	1	—	Runner-up 2004–05
Varteks	—	—	3	Third place 2005–06
Varaždin	—	—	1	Third place 2025–26
Cibalia	—	—	1	Third place 2009–10
Hrvatski Dragovoljac	—	—	1	Third place 1996–97
RNK Split	—	—	1	Third place 2010–11

== All-time HNL table ==
All-time HNL table (end of 2022–23 season)
Pos (by Pts)	Team	S	Pts	GP	W	D	L	GF	GA	1st	2nd	3rd	T	Debut	Since/ Last App	Best	Win%
1	GNK Dinamo Zagreb	32	2375	1047	727	194	126	2550	890	24	4	2	30	1992	1992	1	69,43%
2	HNK Hajduk Split	32	1968	1047	577	240	230	2053	1096	6	14	6	26	1992	1992	1	55,10%
3	HNK Rijeka	32	1700	1051	476	272	303	1723	1328	2	7	5	13	1992	1992	1	45,29%
4	NK Osijek	32	1535	1047	421	272	354	1602	1482	0	1	9	10	1992	1992	2	40,21%
5	NK Slaven Belupo	26	1100	869	281	253	335	1120	1270	0	1	1	2	1997–98	1997–98	2	32,33%
6	NK Zagreb	24	1043	759	286	185	288	1163	1160	1	2	3	6	1992	2015–16	1	37,68%
7	NK Varaždin (1931–2015)	21	870	654	243	142	269	1047	1076	0	0	3	3	1992	2011–12	3	37,15%
8	HNK Cibalia	22	818	699	210	188	301	848	1101	0	0	1	1	1992	2017–18	3	30,04%
9	HNK Šibenik	21	766	670	199	169	302	796	1035	0	0	0	0	1992	2020–21	4	29,70%
10	NK Inter Zaprešić	20	739	647	193	160	294	783	1045	0	1	0	1	1992	2019–20	2	29,82%
11	NK Lokomotiva	14	657	483	180	117	186	643	653	0	2	0	2	2009–10	2009–10	2	37,26%
12	NK Zadar	20	649	597	169	142	286	741	1159	0	0	0	0	1992	2014–15	6	28,30%
13	NK Istra 1961	17	586	580	141	172	276	603	875	0	0	0	0	2004–05	2009–10	5	24,31%
14	NK Hrvatski Dragovoljac	10	360	319	90	80	149	355	494	0	0	1	1	1995–96	2021–22	3	28,21%
15	RNK Split	7	312	237	81	69	87	253	262	0	0	1	1	2010–11	2016–17	3	34,17%
16	HNK Gorica	5	248	180	65	49	66	204	191	0	0	0	0	2018–19	2018–19	5	36,11%
17	NK Istra	7	243	215	65	48	102	215	312	0	0	0	0	1992	1999–2000	6	30,02%
18	NK Kamen Ingrad	6	217	191	59	40	92	314	386	0	0	0	0	2001–02	2006–07	4	30,89%
19	HNK Segesta	5	207	160	55	42	63	197	206	0	0	0	0	1992–93	1996–97	8	34,37%
20	NK Marsonia	6	202	190	53	43	94	269	416	0	0	0	0	1994–95	2003–04	5	27,89%
21	NK Međimurje	5	150	160	40	30	90	227	390	0	0	0	0	2004–05	2009–10	9	25,00%
22	HNK Suhopolje	4	128	108	34	26	48	119	149	0	0	0	0	1995–96	1998–99	9	31,48%
23	NK Karlovac	3	112	90	29	26	35	82	103	0	0	0	0	2009–10	2011–12	6	32,22%
24	NK Varaždin (2012)	3	110	108	27	29	52	100	131	0	0	0	0	2019–20	2020–21	8	25,00%
25	NK Belišće	3	93	94	24	21	49	115	170	0	0	0	0	1992–93	1994–95	12	25,53%
26	HNK Dubrovnik 1919	3	77	86	18	23	45	54	133	0	0	0	0	1992	1993–94	11	20,93%
27	NK Pomorac Kostrena	2	72	62	19	15	28	78	93	0	0	0	0	2001–02	2002–03	7	30,64%
28	NK Čakovec	2	71	62	19	14	29	78	109	0	0	0	0	2000–01	2001–02	7	30,64%
29	NK Pazinka	2	65	64	15	20	29	71	95	0	0	0	0	1992–93	1993–94	11	23,43%
30	NK Primorac 1929	2	60	64	18	17	29	69	103	0	0	0	0	1993–94	1994–95	14	28,12%
31	NK Rudeš	2	54	72	13	15	44	67	142	0	0	0	0	2017–18	2018–19	8	18,00%
32	NK Croatia Sesvete	2	39	63	9	13	41	61	147	0	0	0	0	2008–09	2009–10	12	14,28%
33	NK Radnik Velika Gorica	2	33	64	12	9	43	47	161	0	0	0	0	1992–93	1993–94	13	18,75%
34	NK Samobor	1	32	32	9	5	18	34	55	0	0	0	0	1997–98	1997–98	12	28,12%
35	NK Lučko	1	31	30	6	13	11	29	36	0	0	0	0	2011–12	2011–12	13	20,00%
36	HNK Vukovar '91	1	30	33	7	9	17	32	56	0	0	0	0	1999–2000	1999–2000	12	21,21%
37	NK Dubrava	1	30	34	7	9	18	28	63	0	0	0	0	1993–94	1993–94	17	20,58%
38	HNK Orijent 1919	1	26	30	5	11	14	28	53	0	0	0	0	1996–97	1996–97	14	16,67%
39	NK Neretva	1	23	30	4	11	15	20	44	0	0	0	0	1996–97	1994–95	15	13,33%
40	NK TŠK Topolovac	1	14	30	4	2	24	31	95	0	0	0	0	2001–02	2001–02	16	13,33%

League or status for 2022–23 season
2022–23 HNL
2022–23 Prva NL
2022–23 Druga NL
Lower leagues
No longer exists

== Top scorers ==
Players in the Prva HNL compete for the Prva HNL Top scorer trophy, awarded to the top scorer at the end of each season. Former Dinamo Zagreb striker Igor Cvitanović held the record for most Prva HNL goals with 126 until April 2012. Cvitanović finished among the top ten goal scorers in 7 out of his 11 seasons in the Prva HNL and won the top scorer title two times. During the 1997–98 season, he became the first player to score 100 Prva HNL goals. On 14 April 2012, Davor Vugrinec scored his 127th goal and surpassed Cvitanović's record. Vugrinec retired in May 2015 with 146 goals on his tally. Only three other players have reached the 100-goal mark, Ivan Krstanović, Joško Popović and Miljenko Mumlek.

Since the first Prva HNL season in 1992, 26 different players have won the top scorers title. Goran Vlaović, Robert Špehar, Igor Cvitanović, Tomislav Šokota and Ivica Olić have won two titles each. Dinamo Zagreb provided most top scorers in Prva HNL with 13. Eduardo holds the record for most goals in a season with 34, done with Dinamo Zagreb in the 2006–07 season. Six goals is the record individual scoring total for a player in a single Prva HNL match, held by Marijo Dodik.

Dinamo Zagreb became the first team to have scored 1,000 goals in the league after Etto scored in a 4–0 victory over NK Zagreb in the 2005–06 season. The highest-scoring match to date in the Prva HNL occurred on 12 December 1993 when Dinamo Zagreb defeated minnows NK Pazinka 10–1.

=== All-time top scorers in the HNL ===
Rank	Player	Goals
1	(Croatia) Davor Vugrinec	146
2	(Croatia) Igor Cvitanović	126
3	(Croatia) Ivan Krstanović	123
4	(Croatia) Joško Popović	111
5	(Croatia) Miljenko Mumlek	107
6	(Croatia) Mijo Caktaš	101
7	(Croatia) Tomislav Erceg	97
8	(Croatia) **Marko Livaja**	93
9	(Croatia) Duje Čop	89
10	(Croatia) Nino Bule	88
Updated 16.04.2026 (**Bold** denotes players still playing in the Prva HNL, italics denotes players still playing professional football).

=== Most appearances in HNL ===
Rank	Player	Appearances
1	(Croatia) Jakov Surać	478
2	(Croatia) Miljenko Mumlek	399
3	(Croatia) Damir Vuica	372
4	(Croatia) Krunoslav Rendulić	368
5	(Croatia) Ivan Krstanović	346
6	(Croatia) Davor Vugrinec	340
7	(Croatia) Mladen Bartolović	338
8	(North Macedonia) Arijan Ademi	334
9	(Croatia) Vedran Jugović	322
10	(Croatia) Josip Bulat	318
Updated 01.01.2026 (**Bold** denotes players still playing in the Prva HNL, italics denotes players still playing professional football).

== Transfers records ==
=== Transfers from HNL ===
#	Player	From	To	Season	Fee
1	(Croatia) Joško Gvardiol	(Croatia) Dinamo Zagreb	(Germany) RB Leipzig	2021/2022	36,80 mln €
2	(Croatia) Marko Pjaca	(Croatia) Dinamo Zagreb	(Italy) Juventus FC	2016/2017	29,40 mln €
3	(Spain) Dani Olmo	(Croatia) Dinamo Zagreb	(Germany) RB Leipzig	2019/2020	29,00 mln €
4	(Croatia) Luka Modrić	(Croatia) Dinamo Zagreb	(England) Tottenham Hotspur F.C.	2008/2009	22,50 mln €
5	(Croatia) Josip Šutalo	(Croatia) Dinamo Zagreb	(Netherlands) AFC Ajax	2023/2024	20,50 mln €
6	(Croatia) Martin Baturina	(Croatia) Dinamo Zagreb	(Italy) Como 1907	2025/2026	18,00 mln €
7	(Croatia) Filip Benković	(Croatia) Dinamo Zagreb	(England) Leicester City F.C.	2018/2019	14,50 mln €
8	(Croatia) Petar Sučić	(Croatia) Dinamo Zagreb	(Italy) FC Inter Milan	2025/2026	14,50 mln €
9	(Croatia) Luka Vušković	(Croatia) HNK Hajduk Split	(England) Tottenham Hotspur F.C.	2023/2024	13,80 mln €
10	(Croatia) Marko Rog	(Croatia) Dinamo Zagreb	(Italy) SSC Napoli	2017/2018	13,50 mln €
10	(Croatia) (Brazil) Eduardo	(Croatia) Dinamo Zagreb	(England) Arsenal F.C.	2007/2008	13,50 mln €

=== Transfers to HNL ===
#	Player	From	To	Season	Fee
1	(Croatia) Marko Rog	RNK Split	Dinamo Zagreb	2015/2016	5,00 mln €
2	(Croatia) Boško Šutalo	Atalanta BC	Dinamo Zagreb	2022/2023	4,05 mln €
3	(Croatia) Dion Drena Beljo	FC Augsburg	Dinamo Zagreb	2025/2026	4,00 mln €
4	(Croatia) Robert Ljubičić	SK Rapid Wien	Dinamo Zagreb	2022/2023	3,00 mln €
5	(Croatia) Luka Ivanušec	NK Lokomotiva Zagreb	Dinamo Zagreb	2019/2020	3,00 mln €
6	(Croatia) Ivan Nevistić	HNK Rijeka	Dinamo Zagreb	2020/2021	3,00 mln €
7	(Spain) Gonzalo Villar	Granada CF	Dinamo Zagreb	2025/2026	3,00 mln €
8	(Croatia) Niko Galešić	HNK Rijeka	Dinamo Zagreb	2024/2025	3,00 mln €
9	(Croatia) Luka Stojković	NK Lokomotiva	Dinamo Zagreb	2023/2024	3,00 mln €
10	(Austria) Robert Ljubičić	Rapid Vienna	Dinamo Zagreb	2021/2022	3,00 mln €

== Awards ==
There are three awards for best players in the Croatian First League:

- Sportske novosti Yellow Shirt award, for the HNL footballer of the year, given by the Croatian sport newspaper Sportske novosti, chosen by sport journalists.
- Prva HNL Player of the Year (Tportal), given by the Croatian website Tportal, chosen by captains of league clubs.
- Football Oscar, given by the Croatian union Football syndicate, chosen by players and managers of league clubs.

== See also ==
- Sport in Croatia
