= Dinamo–Red Star riot =

1990 football riot at Maksimir Stadium in Zagreb, SR Croatia

Dinamo-Red Star riot
- Part of the 1989–90 Yugoslav First League and the breakup of Yugoslavia
- Location map of Zagreb in Yugoslavia in 1990
- Date: 13 May 1990
- Location: Zagreb, SR Croatia, SFR Yugoslavia; 45°49′N 15°59′E
- Caused by: Breakup of Yugoslavia
- Goals: Cause unrest in Croatia
- Methods: Riots, ultras clash
- Result: No direct results

Parties
Bad Blue Boys; Supported by: (Socialist Republic of Croatia) Croatian public	Delije; Supported by: Yugoslav Militia

Lead figures
unknown	Željko Ražnatović

Number
unknown	3,000

Casualties and losses
None	Dozens of policemen and ultras wounded

The Dinamo Zagreb–Red Star Belgrade riot was a football riot which took place on 13 May 1990 at Maksimir Stadium in Zagreb, SR Croatia, then part of SFR Yugoslavia, between the Bad Blue Boys (supporters of Dinamo Zagreb) and the Delije (supporters of Red Star Belgrade). The incident took place just weeks after Croatia's first multi-party elections in almost fifty years in which the parties favouring Croatian independence had won the majority of votes. The riot resulted in over sixty people wounded, including some stabbed, shot or poisoned by tear gas.

== Background ==
Tension between Dinamo Zagreb and Red Star Belgrade was always high as they consistently placed at the top of the Yugoslav First League and often won the national championships. In 1990, this fierce rivalry was heightened due to rising ethnic tensions in Yugoslavia. The first multi-party elections were held in most of Yugoslavia and communism was ousted in favour of more nationalist parties.

The second round of voting in Croatia was held on 6 May when the Croatian Democratic Union (HDZ) won under Franjo Tuđman. Croatia and Slovenia, under new leadership, were the leading forces behind a drive to reorganize Yugoslavia into a confederation, but were opposed by Serbia under Slobodan Milošević and the still powerful communist system at state-level. Approximately 3,000 Delije (Red Star fans) made the trip to Zagreb. Between 15,000 and 20,000 spectators were estimated to have attended the game.

The Delije were led by Željko Ražnatović (also known as "Arkan"), a Serbian nationalist, wanted for various robberies and murders in Europe, who would soon be leading the Serb Volunteer Guard to commit crimes against humanity during the Yugoslav Wars. Many fans of both Red Star and Dinamo would fight in the subsequent wars, with some of the Delije joining Arkan's paramilitary organization. Both Dinamo and Red Star had violent undertones and essentially functioned as paramilitary organizations, rather than mere football fan clubs.

== The clash ==
Up to several hours before the kick-off, skirmishes were reported around Zagreb between Red Star fans (Delije) and Dinamo fans (Bad Blue Boys), which then carried over to Maksimir Stadium.

Provoked by stones reportedly being thrown by the Bad Blue Boys, the Delije, situated in the stadium's segregated area reserved for visiting fans, began to tear up the advertising plates and eventually made their way to Dinamo fans. The Delije proceeded to attack them with torn-off seats after reportedly chanting Serbian nationalist slogans like, "Zagreb is Serbian" and, "We'll kill Tuđman". Revolted by what they saw, the Bad Blue Boys at the north and east stands attempted to storm the pitch, but were quickly pushed back by the police wielding batons and tear gas. Within minutes the situation got out of hand as the Bad Blue Boys could no longer be held back. They breached the fence and took to the pitch to charge at their Serbian counterparts. The police were quickly overwhelmed but came back with reinforcements, using armored vans and water cannons to disperse the rioters. More than an hour later, after the stadium was set on fire, the riot was brought under control.

The police were later deemed to have been too lenient with Delije during their early sporadic outbursts, which sparked the larger riot.

=== Zvonimir Boban's kick ===
Amidst the chaos several Dinamo players still remained on the pitch, the Red Star players having already left for the locker rooms. Zvonimir Boban, the Dinamo captain, kicked a police officer, Refik Ahmetović (an ethnic Bosniak), who was allegedly mistreating a Dinamo supporter. The Bad Blue Boys came to Boban's defence, acting as human shield. The event would later come to symbolize in the minds of Croat nationalists the beginning of Croatian resistance against Serbia. Boban was proclaimed a national hero of Croatia, but also attained a Croat nationalist reputation in Serbia. He was suspended by the Football Association of Yugoslavia (FSJ) for six months, missing the 1990 FIFA World Cup, and had criminal charges filed against him. The officer he had attacked publicly forgave Boban for his actions several years later.

Here I was, a public figure prepared to risk his life, career, and everything that fame could have brought, for one ideal, one cause - the Croatian cause.

— Zvonimir Boban after the incident, CNN

== Aftermath ==
The riot marked the beginning of the end for the Yugoslav First League. By the end of the following 1990–91 season, Slovenia and Croatia declared independence from Yugoslavia. With that, both new countries formed their own football league systems (Croatian football league system and Slovenian football league system), withdrawing from the Yugoslav system. The Yugoslav First League lasted for one more season after that, but by the end of 1991–92 season the ongoing breakup of Yugoslavia was well underway.

== Impact ==
The Dinamo-Red Star riot is believed by some to have sparked the ensuing Croatian War of Independence. This narrative has been popularized through documentaries and journalistic pieces. However, recent examinations show that this myth reflected the subsequent events to come rather than the other way around. Detractors from this view also cite other football-related controversies that followed the rest of that summer.

For Croatians, Boban's actions along with those of the Bad Blue Boys came to be symbolic, representing a foundational moment in their desire for an independent Croatia. In Croatian media, unsubstantiated theories have been presented to demonstrate that the violence was planned by Yugoslav secret services and Serb police chiefs. Columnist Franklin Foer writes, "To anyone watching, it was clear that both Serbs and Croats had come ready to fight. Rocks had been carefully stockpiled in the stadium before the game, waiting to be thrown. Acid had been strategically stored so that Croatian fans could burn through the fences separating them from their Serbian counterparts".

== See also ==
- Football War in 1969 in Central America
