= Slavoljub Janković =

Serbian footballer

Personal information
- Date of birth: 17 February 1969 (age 57)
- Place of birth: Paraćin, SFR Yugoslavia
- Position: Defender

Youth career
- Red Star Belgrade

Senior career*
Years	Team	Apps	(Gls)
1987–1990	Red Star Belgrade	4	(0)
1988–1989	→ Napredak Kruševac (loan)	23	(1)
1990	→ Budućnost Titograd (loan)	1	(0)
1991–1992	OFK Belgrade	4	(0)
1992–1995	Napredak Kruševac	43	(3)
1995–1997	Lokomotiv Plovdiv	39	(3)
Total		114	(7)

International career
1987	Yugoslavia U20	4	(0)

Managerial career
- 2009: Radnički Niš
- 2011: Juhor Obrež
Medal record
Representing Yugoslavia
Gold medal – first place	FIFA U-20 World Cup	1987
- * Club domestic league appearances and goals

Slavoljub Janković (Serbian Cyrillic: Славољуб Јанковић; born 17 February 1969) is a Serbian former footballer who played as a defender.

== Career ==
He played in the juvenile ranks of Red Star Belgrade and featured the Yugoslavia national under-20 football team that won the title at the 1987 FIFA World Youth Championship. Although he became league champions with Red Star in 1990 Janković didn't become a regular in the team and had spells with Napredak, Budućnost and OFK Belgrade where his career didn't prosper with the start of the Yugoslav Wars. Later on he played in Greece.

He started his coaching at Jedinstvo and later on with SFS Borac. In August 2009 Janković was appointed manager at Radnički Niš and in July 2011 at Juhor Obrež.
