= 1990–91 Yugoslav Cup =

1990–91 Yugoslav Football Cup
43rd Marshal Tito Cup

Tournament details
- Country: Yugoslavia

Final positions
- Champions: Hajduk Split (9th title)
- Runners-up: Red Star Belgrade

Tournament statistics
- Matches played: 45

The 1990-91 Cup of Yugoslavia was the penultimate season of SFR Yugoslavia's football knockout competition. It was the last season that the cup was also known as the Marshal Tito Cup. It was also the last season in which Croatian and Slovenian teams participated, as the two countries seceded from Yugoslavia in 1991. Croatia's Hajduk Split beat Crvena Zvezda 1–0 to win the cup.

As Croatia seceded from Yugoslavia, Hajduk's Igor Štimac said, "This trophy will forever stay with us, because I believe that the Cup of Yugoslavia will never be played again." The trophy was never returned to the Football Association of Yugoslavia.

== First round ==
In the following tables winning teams are marked in bold; teams from outside top level are marked in italic script.

| Tie no | Home team | Score | Away team |
|---|---|---|---|
| 1 | Belišće | 2–4 | **Red Star** |
| 2 | **Borac Banja Luka** | 1–0 | Vardar |
| 3 | Borac Šamac | 0–7 | **Dinamo Zagreb** |
| 4 | **Budućnost Titograd** | 1–0 | Sloboda Titovo Užice |
| 5 | **Koper** | 3–0 | Spartak Subotica |
| 6 | Novi Sad | 0–1 | **Sloboda Tuzla** |
| 7 | Olimpija Ljubljana | 1–1 (2–4 p) | **Proleter Zrenjanin** |
| 8 | **Osijek** | 3–2 | Velež |
| 9 | **Partizan** | 2–0 | Sutjeska Nikšić |
| 10 | **Pelister** | 2–1 | Rad |
| 11 | Radnički Niš | 1–2 (a.e.t.) | **OFK Belgrade** |
| 12 | **Sarajevo** | 6–1 | Borac Čačak |
| 13 | Trepča | 1–7 | **Vojvodina** |
| 14 | Vrapče | 0–6 | **Hajduk Split** |
| 15 | Vratnik | 1–5 | **Željezničar Sarajevo** |
| 16 | Zadar | 0–0 (2–4 p) | **Rijeka** |

== Second round ==
| Tie no | Team 1 | Agg. | Team 2 | 1st leg | 2nd leg |
|---|---|---|---|---|---|
| 1 | **Borac Banja Luka** | 2–1 | Osijek | 2–0 | 0–1 |
| 2 | **Budućnost Titograd** | 2–1 | Partizan | 2–0 | 0–1 |
| 3 | **Dinamo Zagreb** | 5–1 | Sarajevo | 1–0 | 4–1 |
| 4 | **Hajduk Split** | 3–3 (a) | Pelister | 1–1 | 2–2 |
| 5 | **OFK Belgrade** | 3–2 | Željezničar Sarajevo | 2–1 | 1–1 |
| 6 | **Proleter Zrenjanin** | 2–0 | Koper | 2–0 | 0–0 |
| 7 | Sloboda Tuzla | 3–4 | **Rijeka** | 2–0 | 1–4 |
| 8 | Vojvodina | 1–4 | **Red Star** | 0–2 | 1–2 |

== Quarter-finals ==
| Tie no | Team 1 | Agg. | Team 2 | 1st leg | 2nd leg |
|---|---|---|---|---|---|
| 1 | **Borac Banja Luka** | 3–2 | Dinamo Zagreb | 3–2 | 0–0 |
| 2 | Budućnost Titograd | 2–3 | **OFK Belgrade** | 1–2 | 1–1 |
| 3 | **Red Star** | 4–2 | Proleter Zrenjanin | 4–1 | 0–1 |
| 4 | Rijeka | 1–2 | **Hajduk Split** | 0–1 | 1–1 |

== Semi-finals ==
| Tie no | Team 1 | Agg. | Team 2 | 1st leg | 2nd leg |
|---|---|---|---|---|---|
| 1 | **Red Star** | 6–3 | OFK Belgrade | 3–0 | 3–3 |
| 2 | **Hajduk Split** | 2–0 | Borac Banja Luka | 1–0 | 1–0 |

== Final ==
8 May 1991
18:00 CET

| Hajduk Split | 1–0 | Red Star Belgrade |
|---|---|---|
| Bokšić 65' | Report (in Croatian) |

Stadion JNA, Belgrade
Attendance: 7,000
Referee: Adem Fazlagić (Čapljina)

| **Hajduk Split** | **Red Star** |

HAJDUK SPLIT:
| GK | 1 | (Socialist Federal Republic of Yugoslavia) Vatroslav Mihačić |
| DF | 2 | (Socialist Federal Republic of Yugoslavia) Mili Hadžiabdić |
| DF | 3 | (Socialist Federal Republic of Yugoslavia) Grgica Kovač | | (substituted off) 72' |
| DF | 4 | (Socialist Federal Republic of Yugoslavia) Igor Štimac (c) | (red card) 70' |
| DF | 5 | (Socialist Federal Republic of Yugoslavia) Dragi Setinov |
| DF | 6 | (Socialist Federal Republic of Yugoslavia) Slaven Bilić |
| FW | 7 | (Socialist Federal Republic of Yugoslavia) Ardian Kozniku | | (substituted off) 78' |
| MF | 8 | (Socialist Federal Republic of Yugoslavia) Ante Miše |
| FW | 9 | (Socialist Federal Republic of Yugoslavia) Alen Bokšić |
| MF | 10 | (Socialist Federal Republic of Yugoslavia) Goran Vučević |
| MF | 11 | (Socialist Federal Republic of Yugoslavia) Robert Jarni |
Substitutes:
| DF | | (Socialist Federal Republic of Yugoslavia) Mario Osibov | | (substituted on) 72' |
| MF | 16 | (Socialist Federal Republic of Yugoslavia) Joško Jeličić | | (substituted on) 78' |
Manager:
(Socialist Federal Republic of Yugoslavia) Josip Skoblar

RED STAR:
| GK | 1 | (Socialist Federal Republic of Yugoslavia) Stevan Stojanović |
| DF | 2 | (Socialist Federal Republic of Yugoslavia) Duško Radinović | | (substituted off) 80' |
| DF | 3 | (Socialist Federal Republic of Yugoslavia) Slobodan Marović |
| MF | 4 | (Socialist Federal Republic of Yugoslavia) Vladimir Jugović |
| DF | 5 | (Romania) Miodrag Belodedici |
| DF | 6 | (Socialist Federal Republic of Yugoslavia) Ilija Najdoski |
| MF | 7 | (Socialist Federal Republic of Yugoslavia) Robert Prosinečki |
| MF | 8 | (Socialist Federal Republic of Yugoslavia) Siniša Mihajlović | (red card) 70' |
| FW | 9 | (Socialist Federal Republic of Yugoslavia) Darko Pančev |
| FW | 10 | (Socialist Federal Republic of Yugoslavia) Dejan Savićević |
| FW | 11 | (Socialist Federal Republic of Yugoslavia) Dragiša Binić |
Substitutes:
| MF | | (Socialist Federal Republic of Yugoslavia) Vlada Stošić | | (substituted on) 80' |
Manager:
(Socialist Federal Republic of Yugoslavia) Ljupko Petrović

== See also ==
- 1990–91 Yugoslav First League
- 1990–91 Yugoslav Second League
