= Stevan Stojanović =

Serbian footballer

Personal information
- Full name: Stevan Stojanović
- Date of birth: 29 October 1964 (age 62)
- Place of birth: Mitrovica, SR Serbia, SFR Yugoslavia
- Height: 1.84 m (6 ft 0 in)
- Position: Goalkeeper

Youth career
- 1979–1982: Red Star Belgrade

Senior career*
| Years | Team | Apps | (Gls) |
| 1982–1991 | Red Star Belgrade | 168 | (0) |
| 1991–1995 | Royal Antwerp | 34 | (0) |
| 1996–1999 | Cloppenburg | | |
| 1999–2000 | Ethnikos Asteras | 8 | (0) |

International career
| 1985 | Yugoslavia U21 | 1 | (0) |
| 1988 | Yugoslavia Olympic | 3 | (0) |

Managerial career
- 2005–2007: Red Star Belgrade (Sports director)
- 2021–2025: Serbia (Athletic director)
- * Club domestic league appearances and goals

Stevan Stojanović (Serbian Cyrillic: Стеван Стојановић; born 29 October 1964) is a retired Serbian football goalkeeper best known for captaining Red Star Belgrade side which won the 1991 European Cup Final.

== Club career ==
He came through Red Star's youth ranks. He spent a couple of seasons as a substitute to Yugoslav internationals like Tomislav Ivković and Živan Ljukovčan before debuting in the 1986-87 season. He participated in Red Star's 4–2 win over Real Madrid in European Cup quarter-finals and stopped a Hugo Sanchez's penalty kick in Belgrade. He quickly became a fans' favourite and was nicknamed Mali Dika (Little Dika) or Mladi Dika (Young Dika) after Red Star's goalkeeper from late seventies and early eighties, Aleksandar Stojanović (no family relationship to another Dika). He won his first Yugoslav title with Red Star in the 1987-88 season and repeated it by winning a national double in 1989-90. A few days before a crucial 1/8 finals UEFA Cup against 1. FC Köln, Stojanović broke his arm during practice. Although Red Star had a comfortable 2–0 advantage from the first match in Belgrade (in which Stojanović was the best player alongside Dejan Savićević), the side fell apart at Müngersdorfer Stadion and conceded two late goals before losing 3–2 on aggregate.

After the departure of Red Star's captain Dragan Stojković in the summer of 1990, Stojanović was voted team captain and led his team mates to Red Star's first and only European Cup title in 1990–91. He missed only one game and bailed out his team mates on many occasions during the campaign. In a nerve-wracking semi-final against Bayern Munich he conceded a memorable goal from Klaus Augenthaler right through the legs, which turned the momentum in Bayern's favour. However, he blocked several difficult shots before Augenthaler scored an infamous own goal in injury time, which sent Red Star to Bari, to participate in the finals against Olympique de Marseille. Again, there was no glamour from Red Star's Savićević or Prosinečki, it was Stojanović who stole the show during 120 minutes and especially in the penalty shootout, when he stopped Manuel Amoros's shot, which resulted in Red Star Belgrade triumphing 5–3 on penalties. Stojanović also became the first goalkeeper to captain a Champions' Cup winning team.

Later he played for Belgium's Royal Antwerp and made an appearance at the 1993 European Cup Winners' Cup Final against Parma AC.

== International career ==
He was called up several times for Yugoslavia national football team, but was not chosen for a competitive A team game. He played for Under 21 and Olympic teams.

== Personal life ==
His son, Marko, is also a footballer.

== Honours ==
Red Star Belgrade

- Yugoslav First League: 1987–88, 1989–90, 1990–91
- Yugoslav Cup: 1989–90
- European Cup: 1990–91

Royal Antwerp

- Belgian Cup: 1991–92
- UEFA Cup Winners' Cup: 1992-93 (runners-up)
