= 1990–91 Yugoslav Second League =

Yugoslav Second League
- Season: 1990–91
- Champions: NK Zagreb
- Promoted: Vardar; OFK Belgrade; Sutjeska; Pelister

The 1990–91 Yugoslav Second League season was the 45th season of the Second Federal League (Serbo-Croatian: Druga savezna liga), the second level association football competition of SFR Yugoslavia, since its establishment in 1946.

== Teams ==
A total of 19 teams contested the league, including fourteen sides from the 1989–90 season, one club relegated from the 1989–90 Yugoslav First League and four sides promoted from the Inter-Republic Leagues played in the 1989–90 season. The league was contested in a double round robin format, with each club playing every other club twice, for a total of 36 rounds. Two points were awarded for a win, while in case of a draw - penalty kicks were taken and the winner of the shootout was awarded one point while the loser got nothing.

Vardar were relegated from the 1989–90 Yugoslav First League after finishing in the 18th place of the league table. The four clubs promoted to the second level were Bor, Mogren, Radnički Belgrade and NK Zagreb.

Location of teams competing in the 1990–91 Yugoslav Second League

Team	Location	Federal subject	Position in 1989–90
OFK Belgrade	Belgrade	SR Serbia	15th
Bor	Bor	SR Serbia	—N/a
Borac Čačak	Čačak	SR Serbia	16th
Dinamo Vinkovci	Vinkovci	SR Croatia	8th
GOŠK-Jug	Dubrovnik	SR Croatia	10th
Iskra	Bugojno	SR Bosnia and Herzegovina	13th
Kikinda	Kikinda	(Socialist Republic of Serbia) SAP Vojvodina	7th
Leotar	Trebinje	SR Bosnia and Herzegovina	11th
Mačva Šabac	Šabac	SR Serbia	12th
Mogren	Budva	SR Montenegro	—N/a
Napredak Kruševac	Kruševac	SR Serbia	14th
Pelister	Bitola	SR Macedonia	9th
Prishtina	Pristina	(Socialist Republic of Serbia) SAP Kosovo	4th
Radnički Belgrade	Belgrade	SR Serbia	—N/a
Sloboda Titovo Užice	Titovo Užice	SR Serbia	6th
Sutjeska	Nikšić	SR Montenegro	3rd
Šibenik	Šibenik	SR Croatia	5th
Vardar	Skopje	SR Macedonia	—N/a
NK Zagreb	Zagreb	SR Croatia	—N/a

== League table ==
Two teams promoted. After the secession of Croatia, four clubs were selected by the Federation between different Republics.

Pos	Team	Pld	W	PKW	PKL	L	GF	GA	GD	Pts	Promotion
1	NK Zagreb (C)	36	20	2	3	11	58	28	+30	42	
2	Vardar (P)	36	19	4	3	10	58	38	+20	42	Promotion to Yugoslav First League
3	OFK Belgrade (P)	36	16	6	3	11	50	33	+17	38	Promotion to Yugoslav First League
4	Sutjeska Nikšić (P)	36	17	4	1	14	43	29	+14	38	Promotion to Yugoslav First League
5	Kikinda	36	17	3	3	13	42	38	+4	37	
6	Pelister (P)	36	17	1	3	15	54	45	+9	35	Promotion to Yugoslav First League
7	Napredak Kruševac	36	15	4	5	12	50	39	+11	34	
8	Prishtina	36	16	1	2	17	48	44	+4	33	
9	Radnički Beograd	36	15	3	1	17	48	48	0	33	
10	Dinamo Vinkovci	36	16	1	4	15	50	53	−3	33	
11	Mogren	36	16	1	5	14	37	42	−5	33	
12	Šibenik	36	14	4	2	16	44	45	−1	32	
13	Bor	36	14	4	3	15	32	38	−6	32	
14	Mačva Šabac	36	13	6	4	13	27	40	−13	32	
15	Sloboda Titovo Užice	36	13	5	3	15	38	36	+2	31	
16	GOŠK-Jug	36	14	3	3	16	31	41	−10	31	
17	Iskra	36	13	3	2	18	31	49	−18	29	
18	Leotar	36	13	1	3	19	44	65	−21	27	
19	Borac Čačak	36	6	2	5	23	29	63	−34	14	

Source: rsssf.org
Rules for classification: 1) points; 2) goal difference; 3) number of goals scored. If a match ended in a draw, penalties were taken, and only the winner of the penalty shoot-out was rewarded with a point.
(C) Champion; (P) Promoted

== See also ==
- 1990–91 Yugoslav First League
- 1990–91 Yugoslav Cup
