= 1989–90 Yugoslav First League =

Prva savezna liga Jugoslavije
- Season: 1989–90
- Dates: 29 July 1989 – 16 May 1990
- Champions: Red Star
- Relegated: Vardar
- European Cup: Red Star
- Cup Winners' Cup: Hajduk Split
- UEFA Cup: Dinamo Zagreb; Partizan
- Matches: 306
- Goals: 748 (2.44 per match)
- Top goalscorer: Darko Pančev (25)

The 1989–90 Yugoslav First League season was the 44th season of the First Federal League (Serbo-Croatian: Prva savezna liga), the top level association football competition of SFR Yugoslavia, since its establishment in 1946.

Two points were awarded for a win, none for a loss, while in case of a draw a penalty shootout was taken with the winner of the shootout being awarded one point.

Red Star won the 17th title.

The season began on 29 July 1989 with its fall part completing on 17 December 1988. Following a two-month winter break, the season resumed on 18 February 1990 and ran until 16 May 1990.

Location of teams competing in the 1989–90 Yugoslav First League

== League table ==
Pos	Team	Pld	W	PKW	PKL	L	GF	GA	GD	Pts	Qualification or relegation
1	Red Star Belgrade (C)	34	24	3	2	5	79	29	+50	51	Qualification for European Cup first round
2	Dinamo Zagreb	34	16	8	3	7	53	25	+28	40	Qualification for UEFA Cup first round
3	Hajduk Split	34	18	2	1	13	50	35	+15	38	Banned from European competition (Note: In November 1987, UEFA banned Hajduk Split from European competitions for two seasons. The immediate catalyst for the punishment was crowd trouble during club's 1987–88 European Cup Winners' Cup match against Marseille on 5 November 1987, however, repeated prior incidents at Hajduk's European home matches throughout early-to-mid 1980s (such as the 1983–84 UEFA Cup semifinal first leg infamous 'rooster incident' against Tottenham Hotspur) also contributed to the decision. Since Hajduk's 1987–88 Yugoslav League performance failed to qualify the club for 1988–89 European competition, the punishment was enacted for seasons when Hajduk did manage to qualify: 1989–90 and 1990–91.)
4	Partizan	34	18	1	3	12	51	42	+9	37	Qualification for UEFA Cup first round
5	Rad	34	16	4	2	12	41	31	+10	36	
6	Rijeka	34	14	5	1	14	29	35	−6	33	
7	Željezničar	34	14	4	2	14	37	40	−3	32	
8	Olimpija	34	14	2	4	14	49	40	+9	30	Qualification for Intertoto Cup
9	Sloboda Tuzla	34	15	0	4	15	43	46	−3	30	
10	Budućnost	34	13	3	5	13	30	35	−5	29	Qualification for Balkans Cup
11	Vojvodina	34	13	3	3	15	43	51	−8	29	
12	Spartak Subotica	34	12	4	2	16	28	40	−12	28	
13	Sarajevo	34	13	1	3	17	46	49	−3	27	
14	Borac Banja Luka	34	12	3	4	15	28	40	−12	27	
15	Radnički Niš	34	12	2	6	14	42	48	−6	26	
16	Osijek	34	12	2	2	18	28	47	−19	26	Qualification for Intertoto Cup
17	Velež	34	11	3	3	17	38	51	−13	25	Relegation to Yugoslav Second League
18	Vardar (R)	34	8	1	1	24	33	64	−31	17	Relegation to Yugoslav Second League

Source: rsssf.org
Rules for classification: 1) points; 2) goal difference; 3) number of goals scored.
(C) Champion; (R) Relegated

== Results ==
Results in brackets indicate the results from penalty shoot-outs whenever games were drawn.

Home \ Away	BBL	BUD	DIN	HAJ	OLI	OSI	PAR	RAD	RNI	RSB	RIJ	SAR	SLO	SPA	VAR	VEL	VOJ	ŽEL
Borac Banja Luka		0–1	1–0	1–0	1–0	1–1^{(4–5)}	1–2	1–0	1–1^{(5–4)}	0–0^{(4–5)}	2–1	2–0	0–0^{(5–4)}	3–1	2–0	1–0	2–2^{(1–3)}	1–0
Budućnost	2–1		2–0	1–0	0–0^{(3–4)}	2–0	2–0	0–1	0–0^{(5–4)}	0–0^{(2–4]}	1–0	1–0	0–1	0–0^{(2–4)}	1–0	1–0	3–1	4–1
Dinamo Zagreb	3–1	0–0^{(4–3)}		2–0	2–1	3–1	2–1	0–0^{(4–5)}	3–0	0–3 (Note: Match awarded after it was not played due to the riots at the Maksimir stadium.)	1–1^{(4–3)}	6–0	5–0	1–0	3–0	3–0	2–0	2–0
Hajduk Split	1–0	2–0	2–3		3–1	1–0	2–0	2–1	1–0	2–1	1–1^{(5–6)}	0–0^{(4–3)}	2–0	3–0	3–0	4–3	6–0	2–0
Olimpija	4–1	3–1	3–0	3–1		1–0	5–1	0–1	1–1^{(1–3)}	1–1^{(6–5)}	2–0	2–1	2–0	0–1	3–0	2–0	2–0	3–0
Osijek	0–1	1–0	1–0	1–0	1–0		0–1	1–1^{(1–3)}	2–1	0–5	0–1	2–0	3–1	1–0	1–0	1–0	2–1	0–1
Partizan	2–1	2–0	1–1^{(3–4)}	1–0	2–0	6–4		0–2	2–1	0–2	0–1	1–1^{(3–5)}	1–0	1–0	3–0	3–0	4–0	0–2
Rad	2–0	2–2^{(2–3)}	0–2	0–2	1–0	1–0	1–1^{(6–5)}		3–0	1–2	4–0	3–0	2–1	0–0^{(6–5)}	2–0	1–0	2–0	1–0
Radnički Niš	1–0	2–1	1–1^{(5–6)}	5–1	2–1	4–1	1–1^{(3–5)}	2–2^{(4–3)}		1–3	3–0	1–0	2–0	1–0	3–0	3–0	0–3	1–0
Red Star	3–0	5–1	0–0^{(2–3)}	2–1	2–0	3–1	1–0	4–2	1–0		1–0	3–0	6–1	3–0	5–2	4–0	3–1	2–2^{(4–3)}
Rijeka	1–0	0–0^{(5–4)}	1–1^{(4–1)}	1–0	0–0^{(3–2)}	1–0	0–1	0–1	2–0	1–4		1–0	3–0	3–0	2–0	1–0	2–0	1–0
Sarajevo	2–0	4–1	1–0	1–0	3–0	3–0	1–2	1–0	5–1	3–1	2–0		2–1	3–3^{(2–4)}	6–1	0–0^{(3–4)}	3–2	1–3
Sloboda Tuzla	4–1	2–0	0–0^{(3–5)}	2–2^{(4–5)}	2–0	2–0	3–1	1–2	2–0	3–0	2–0	2–0		2–0	1–0	1–1^{(4–5)}	2–0	4–1
Spartak Subotica	2–0	1–0	1–1^{(5–6)}	1–0	2–3	1–0	0–4	1–0	1–1^{(4–3)}	1–3	0–1	2–0	0–1		2–0	2–1	0–0^{(4–2)}	1–0
Vardar	3–0	4–1	0–4	1–2	3–3^{(5–4)}	0–1	2–3	2–1	3–0	0–2	0–0^{(4–5)}	2–1	2–0	1–2		4–1	1–2	0–1
Velež	0–0^{(3–4)}	0–0^{(4–5)}	2–1	1–0	2–0	1–1^{(3–4)}	3–1	3–0	3–2	0–3	3–2	3–1	3–0	1–3	2–1		0–0^{(6–5)}	5–1
Vojvodina	0–1	1–2	1–1^{(3–4)}	2–3	3–1	1–1^{(5–3)}	3–1	2–1	3–0	2–1	2–0	2–1	3–1	1–0	1–0	2–0		1–1^{(5–4)}
Željezničar	1–1^{(4–3)}	1–0	0–0^{(2–0)}	0–1	2–2^{(5–4)}	3–0	0–2	1–0	1–1^{(4–2)}	3–0	4–1	1–0	2–1	1–0	0–1	2–0	2–1	

Source: DataSoccer.it
Legend: Blue = home team win; Yellow = draw; Red = away team win.

== Winning squad ==
Champions: Red Star Belgrade
Player	League	
Player	Matches	Goals
(Socialist Federal Republic of Yugoslavia) Darko Pančev	32	25
(Socialist Federal Republic of Yugoslavia) Dragan "Piksi" Stojković	31	10
(Socialist Federal Republic of Yugoslavia) Robert Prosinečki	31	5
(Socialist Federal Republic of Yugoslavia) Duško Radinović	29	2
(Socialist Federal Republic of Yugoslavia) Ilija Najdoski	29	1
(Socialist Federal Republic of Yugoslavia) Dragi Kanatlarovski	29	1
(Socialist Federal Republic of Yugoslavia) Stevan Stojanović (goalkeeper)	29	0
(Socialist Federal Republic of Yugoslavia) Slobodan Marović	27	2
(Socialist Federal Republic of Yugoslavia) Dejan Savićević	25	10
(Socialist Federal Republic of Yugoslavia) Vladan Lukić	25	10
(Socialist Federal Republic of Yugoslavia) Vlada Stošić	24	4
(Socialist Federal Republic of Yugoslavia) Mitar Mrkela	23	2
(Socialist Federal Republic of Yugoslavia) Goran Jurić	21	0
(Socialist Federal Republic of Yugoslavia) Zoran Vujović	15	0
(Romania) Miodrag Belodedici (Note: only played the second part of the season due to being suspended by UEFA for breach of contract with Steaua)	14	1
(Socialist Federal Republic of Yugoslavia) Miloš Drizić	11	1
(Socialist Federal Republic of Yugoslavia) Refik Šabanadžović	10	0
(Socialist Federal Republic of Yugoslavia) Zvonko Milojević (goalkeeper)	4	0
(Socialist Federal Republic of Yugoslavia) Slavoljub Janković	2	0
(Socialist Federal Republic of Yugoslavia) Zoran Pavlović	2	0
(Socialist Federal Republic of Yugoslavia) Zoran Dimitrijević	2	0
(Socialist Federal Republic of Yugoslavia) Ivan Adžić	1	0
(Socialist Federal Republic of Yugoslavia) Vladimir Jugović	1	0
Head coach: Dragoslav Šekularac

== Top scorers ==
Rank	Player	Club	Goals
1	(Socialist Federal Republic of Yugoslavia) Darko Pančev	Red Star	25
2	(Socialist Federal Republic of Yugoslavia) Meho Kodro	Velež	18
3	(Socialist Federal Republic of Yugoslavia) Josip Višnjić	Radnički Niš	16
4	(Socialist Federal Republic of Yugoslavia) Aljoša Asanović	Hajduk Split	14
5	(Socialist Federal Republic of Yugoslavia) Boban Božović	Sarajevo	13
6	(Socialist Federal Republic of Yugoslavia) Davor Šuker	Dinamo Zagreb	12
6	(Socialist Federal Republic of Yugoslavia) Alen Bokšić	Hajduk Split	12
6	(Socialist Federal Republic of Yugoslavia) Dinko Vrabac	Olimpija	12
9	(Socialist Federal Republic of Yugoslavia) Siniša Mihajlović	Vojvodina	11
9	(Socialist Federal Republic of Yugoslavia) Željko Ivanović	Sloboda Tuzla	11

== See also ==
- 1989–90 Yugoslav Second League
- 1989–90 Yugoslav Cup
- Dinamo Zagreb-Red Star Belgrade riot
