= 1992 Croatian First Football League =

Croatian First Football League
- Season: 1992
- Dates: 28 February 1992 – 13 June 1992
- Champions: Hajduk Split; 1st Croatian title 10th domestic title
- Relegated: None
- Matches: 132
- Goals: 315 (2.39 per match)
- Top goalscorer: Ardian Kozniku (12)
- Biggest home win: Hajduk Split 9–0 Dubrovnik (11 March 1992)
- Biggest away win: Zadar 0–4 NK Zagreb (14 March 1992)
- Highest scoring: Hajduk Split 9–0 Dubrovnik (9 goals) (11 March 1992)
- Average attendance: 2,881

The 1992 Croatian First Football League, also known as 1. HNL, was the first season of the top Croatian football league. It was the inaugural season of the league established following Croatia's independence from Yugoslavia.

Affected by the political upheavals stemming from the breakup of Yugoslavia and the early stages of the 1991–95 war, the season was drastically shortened and played over the course of less than four months, from 29 February to 13 June.

The league featured 12 Croatian-based clubs, all of which had previously competed at various levels in the Yugoslav football pyramid. Four of the clubs came from the top level First Federal League, another four from the Second Federal League, and the remaining four from lower levels.

The format used was a double round robin tournament, with each club playing every other club twice in home and away matches, for a total of 22 rounds. However, five of the clubs based in areas most affected by fighting had to host their matches in other towns around the country, effectively playing the entire season in exile. These were Cibalia and Osijek (based in the eastern part of the country, in the cities of Vinkovci and Osijek) and Zadar, Šibenik and Dubrovnik (based in the southern coastal part of the country, in the cities of Zadar, Šibenik and Dubrovnik).

After four of the five displaced clubs finished in the bottom four places, the Croatian Football Federation (HNS) decided against relegating any of them, and opted instead to expand the format to 16 clubs for the following 1992–93 season.

== Clubs ==
Locations of teams in 1992 Prva HNL

| Club^{1} | City / Town | Stadium | Head coach | 1990–91 result |
|---|---|---|---|---|
| Cibalia | Vinkovci | Mladost^{2} | (Croatia) Mile Petković | 8th in Yugoslav Div 2 |
| Dubrovnik | Dubrovnik | Lapad^{2} | (Croatia) Mario Bonić | 16th in Yugoslav Div 2 |
| Hajduk Split | Split | Poljud | (Croatia) Stanko Poklepović | 6th in Yugoslav Div 1 |
| HAŠK Građanski | Zagreb | Maksimir | (Croatia) Zdenko Kobeščak | 2nd in Yugoslav Div 1 |
| Inker Zaprešić | Zaprešić | Stadion Inkera | (Croatia) Ilija Lončarević | 2nd in Yugoslav Div 3 West |
| Istra Pula | Pula | Aldo Drosina | (Croatia) Sergio Scoria | 4th in Yugoslav Div 4 West^{3} |
| Osijek | Osijek | Gradski vrt^{2} | (Croatia) Stjepan Čordaš | 9th in Yugoslav Div 1 |
| Rijeka | Rijeka | Kantrida | (Croatia) Marijan Jantoljak | 15th in Yugoslav Div 1 |
| Šibenik | Šibenik | Šubićevac^{2} | (Croatia) Nikica Cukrov | 12th in Yugoslav Div 2 |
| Varteks | Varaždin | Stadion Varteks | (Croatia) Branko Ivanković | 6th in Yugoslav Div 3 West^{3} |
| Zadar | Zadar | Stanovi^{2} | (Croatia) Goran Krešimir Vidov | 1st in Yugoslav Div 3 West |
| NK Zagreb | Zagreb | Kranjčevićeva | (Croatia) Ivo Šušak | 2nd in Yugoslav Div 2 |

=== Notes ===
- ^{1} Several clubs were renamed shortly before the 1992 season began:
  - NK Dinamo Vinkovci became HNK Cibalia
  - NK GOŠK Jug Dubrovnik became HNK Dubrovnik
  - NK Dinamo Zagreb became NK HAŠK Građanski
  - NK Jugokeramika Zaprešić became NK Inker Zaprešić
- ^{2} Five clubs were displaced and forced to host their home games outside their hometowns due to shelling in the ongoing Croatian War of Independence:
  - Cibalia hosted 5 matches in Đakovo (against Hajduk, Osijek, Varteks, Šibenik and Zadar), 1 match in Zagreb (against Dubrovnik), 1 match in Čakovec (against HAŠK Građanski), and 4 matches in Požega (against Rijeka, Inker, NK Zagreb and Istra).
  - Dubrovnik hosted 4 matches in Metković (against Zadar, HAŠK Građanski, Rijeka and Inker), and 7 matches in Blato on the island of Korčula (against NK Zagreb, Istra, Hajduk, Osijek, Varteks, Šibenik and Cibalia).
  - Osijek hosted 3 matches in Đakovo (against NK Zagreb, Istra and Dubrovnik), 4 matches in Donji Miholjac (against Hajduk, Zadar, Rijeka and Varteks) and 4 matches in Kutjevo (against Inker, Šibenik, Cibalia and HAŠK Građanski).
  - Šibenik hosted 7 matches in Split (against Osijek, Varteks, Istra, Dubrovnik, Hajduk, Rijeka and Inker), 1 match in Stobreč (against NK Zagreb), 2 matches in Žrnovnica (against Zadar and Cibalia) and a single match in their home town of Šibenik (against HAŠK Građanski).
  - Zadar hosted 4 matches in Split (against Varteks, NK Zagreb, Šibenik and Istra), 5 matches in Solin (against Cibalia, HAŠK Građanski, Hajduk, Rijeka and Osijek), 1 match in Crikvenica (against Dubrovnik), and a single match in their home town of Zadar (against Inker).
- ^{3} Varteks and Istra took part upon invitation from the Croatian Football federation - they were given preference over NK Radnik, fourth in the Yugoslav Division 3 West, and NK Neretva, third in Yugoslav Division 3 South.

== League table ==
| Pos | Team | Pld | W | D | L | GF | GA | GD | Pts |
|---|---|---|---|---|---|---|---|---|---|
| 1 | Hajduk Split (C) | 22 | 16 | 4 | 2 | 44 | 14 | +30 | 36 |
| 2 | NK Zagreb | 22 | 14 | 5 | 3 | 34 | 9 | +25 | 33 |
| 3 | Osijek | 22 | 12 | 3 | 7 | 33 | 28 | +5 | 27 |
| 4 | Inker Zaprešić | 22 | 10 | 6 | 6 | 37 | 19 | +18 | 26 (Note: Head-to-head record: Inker Zaprešić–HAŠK Građanski 2−1, HAŠK Građanski–Inker Zaprešić 0−2.) |
| 5 | HAŠK Građanski | 22 | 11 | 4 | 7 | 32 | 21 | +11 | 26 |
| 6 | Rijeka | 22 | 10 | 5 | 7 | 26 | 22 | +4 | 25 |
| 7 | Istra Pula | 22 | 8 | 5 | 9 | 22 | 27 | −5 | 21 |
| 8 | Varteks | 22 | 7 | 6 | 9 | 32 | 25 | +7 | 20 |
| 9 | Cibalia | 22 | 3 | 9 | 10 | 13 | 24 | −11 | 15 |
| 10 | Zadar | 22 | 4 | 5 | 13 | 20 | 49 | −29 | 13 |
| 11 | Dubrovnik | 22 | 2 | 7 | 13 | 4 | 36 | −32 | 11 (Note: Head-to-head record: Šibenik–Dubrovnik 0−0, Dubrovnik–Šibenik 2−1.) |
| 12 | Šibenik | 22 | 2 | 7 | 13 | 18 | 41 | −23 | 11 |

Source: RSSSF.org
Rules for classification: 1st points; 2nd head-to-head points.
(C) Champions

=== Relegation ===
At the end of the season no teams were relegated as it was decided that the league would expand to 16 clubs for the 1992–93 Croatian First Football League season.

=== European competitions ===
During the season Hajduk Split and HAŠK Građanski took part in European competitions on account of qualification secured at the end of the 1990–91 Yugoslav football season - Dinamo/HAŠK ended up as runners-up in the 1990–91 Yugoslav First League and qualified for 1991–92 UEFA Cup while Hajduk Split won the 1990–91 Yugoslav Cup and qualified for the 1991–92 European Cup Winners' Cup.

However, due to violent fighting in parts of the country, UEFA ordered both clubs to host their European matches abroad, in Austria. Dinamo played their UEFA Cup first round fixture against Trabzonspor in Klagenfurt on 11 September 1991 (losing the tie 3–4 on aggregate), while Hajduk Split played their Cup Winners' Cup first round match against Tottenham Hotspur on 17 September 1991 in Linz (also losing the tie 1–2 on aggregate).

At the end of the 1992 season, neither Hajduk Split (1992 Croatian league champions) nor Inker Zaprešić (1992 Croatian Football Cup winners) could qualify for European competitions in the following 1992–93 season as the Croatian Football Federation, the league's governing body, had not been accepted as full member by UEFA. Since its application was finally accepted by UEFA in June 1993, the first Croatian-qualified clubs entered European competitions in the 1993–94 season.

== Results ==
| Home \ Away | CIB | DBK | HAJ | HGR | INK | IST | OSI | RIJ | ŠIB | VAR | ZAD | ZAG |
|---|---|---|---|---|---|---|---|---|---|---|---|---|
| Cibalia | | 0–0 | 0–2 | 0–2 | 1–0 | 1–1 | 1–1 | 2–0 | 0–0 | 2–1 | 0–1 | 0–1 |
| Dubrovnik | 0–0 | | 0–1 | 0–3 | 0–3 | 1–0 | 0–0 | 0–1 | 2–1 | 0–0 | 0–2 | 0–0 |
| Hajduk Split | 1–1 | 9–0 | | 0–0 | 0–2 | 3–1 | 2–0 | 3–0 | 4–1 | 1–0 | 2–0 | 1–0 |
| HAŠK Građanski | 2–0 | 2–1 | 1–2 | | 0–2 | 3–1 | 2–0 | 2–0 | 2–0 | 4–0 | 3–0 | 0–0 |
| Inker Zaprešić | 0–0 | 3–0 | 0–0 | 2–1 | | 4–1 | 3–0 | 3–0 (Note: The match between Inker and Rijeka was suspended with the scoreline 1–0 for Rijeka. The game was later awarded to Inker and registered with the score 3–0.) | 6–0 | 1–3 | 2–1 | 0–0 |
| Istra Pula | 2–0 | 2–0 | 0–1 | 1–1 | 2–0 | | 1–2 | 1–1 | 1–0 | 2–1 | 2–1 | 0–2 |
| Osijek | 2–1 | 1–0 | 3–3 | 1–2 | 2–1 | 0–1 | | 3–2 | 3–1 | 2–1 | 4–0 | 1–0 |
| Rijeka | 1–0 | 3–0 | 0–2 | 1–0 | 0–0 | 3–0 | 2–0 | | 2–0 | 1–0 | 4–1 | 1–1 |
| Šibenik | 1–1 | 0–0 | 2–3 | 3–1 | 1–1 | 0–0 | 0–2 | 1–2 | | 2–2 | 4–0 | 0–1 |
| Varteks | 2–0 | 2–0 | 0–1 | 4–0 | 1–1 | 1–1 | 0–1 | 1–1 | 4–0 | | 4–0 | 2–1 |
| Zadar | 2–2 | 0–0 | 0–3 | 1–1 | 4–3 | 0–1 | 3–5 | 1–1 | 1–1 | 2–1 | | 0–4 |
| NK Zagreb | 2–1 | 3–0 | 3–0 | 2–0 | 2–0 | 2–1 | 2–0 | 1–0 | 3–0 | 2–2 | 2–0 | |

Source: RSSSF.org
Legend: Blue = home team win; Yellow = draw; Red = away team win.

== Season statistics ==
- Most goals in a match: 9 goals – Hajduk Split 9–0 Dubrovnik (11 March 1992).
- Widest winning margin: 9 goals – Hajduk Split 9–0 Dubrovnik (11 March 1992).
- First hat-trick of the season: Nenad Bjelica for Osijek against Šibenik (2 May 1992).

== Top goalscorers ==
| Rank | Player | Club | Goals |
|---|---|---|---|
| 1 | (Croatia) Ardian Kozniku | Hajduk Split | 12 |
| 2 | (Croatia) Igor Cvitanović | Varteks | 9 |
| 2 | (Croatia) Robert Špehar | Osijek | 9 |
| 2 | (Croatia) Goran Vlaović | HAŠK Građanski | 9 |
| 5 | (Croatia) Željko Adžić | HAŠK Građanski | 8 |
| 5 | (Croatia) Renato Jurčec | NK Zagreb | 8 |
| 5 | (Croatia) Goran Vučević | Hajduk Split | 8 |
| 8 | (Croatia) Nenad Bjelica | Osijek | 7 |
| 8 | (Croatia) Grgica Kovač | Varteks | 7 |
| 8 | (Croatia) Ivica Mornar | Hajduk Split | 7 |
| 8 | (Croatia) Zoran Škerjanc | Rijeka | 7 |
| 8 | (Croatia) Dževad Turković | Varteks | 7 |

=== Hat-tricks ===
| Player | For | Against | Date |
|---|---|---|---|
| (Croatia) Nenad Bjelica | Osijek | Šibenik | 2 May 1992 |
| (Croatia) Dean Ljubančić | Rijeka | Istra Pula | 2 May 1992 |

Source: prva-hnl.hr (in Croatian)

== See also ==
- 1992 Croatian Football Cup
