= 1990–91 Yugoslav First League =

Prva savezna liga Jugoslavije
- Season: 1990–91
- Dates: 4 August 1990 – 16 June 1991
- Champions: Red Star
- European Cup: Red Star
- Cup Winners' Cup: Hajduk Split
- UEFA Cup: Dinamo Zagreb; Partizan
- Goals: 883
- Top goalscorer: Darko Pančev (34)

The 1990–91 Yugoslav First League season was the 45th season of the First Federal League (Serbo-Croatian: Prva savezna liga), the top level association football competition of SFR Yugoslavia, since its establishment in 1946. The title was won by Red Star Belgrade, the club's 18th in its history. It also turned out to be the last season in which teams from SR Croatia and SR Slovenia participated. In 1991, these states left Yugoslavia and created their respective leagues.

Two points were awarded for a win, while the tied matches were decided by a penalty shootout with the winner getting a point.

Location of teams competing in the 1990-91 Yugoslav First League

== Incidents ==
=== Ethnically motivated violent pitch invasion ===
The season featured a huge politically and ethnically motivated incident during the Hajduk Split vs. FK Partizan tie on Wednesday, 26 September 1990 at Poljud Stadium, when a mob of hardcore Hajduk fans invaded the pitch during second half in an attempt to lynch Partizan players. All of the Partizan players managed to run away into the dressing room, thus escaping unharmed. While chanting anti-Serb slogans, the violent mob then set fire to the Yugoslav flag that was displayed on the stadium's official mast. They then proceeded to raise the Croatian chequerboard flag (at the time not in official use and thus considered a Croatian nationalist symbol). At the moment of the incident, Partizan was leading 0–2 courtesy of a Milan Đurđević brace. The match was never resumed and eventually registered 0–3 in Partizan's favour.

=== Eternal derby: Red Star v. Partizan incidents ===
On Saturday, 27 April 1991, only three days after making the European Cup final by advancing against favoured Bayern Munich via managing a hard-fought home draw in the famous emotional rollercoaster semifinal return leg in front of 90,000 fans, league leaders Red Star hosted their heated cross-town rival FK Partizan in the 88th league edition of the Eternal derby. Following an entertaining first half played in front of some 35,000 spectators, at the end of which Red Star led 3–1, the match was halted for 10 minutes at the beginning of the second half due to FK Partizan ultras, the Grobari, rioting in the Marakana stadium's south stand by pelting the pitch and athletic track with construction material found in front of the stand.

The match play resumed before being interrupted several more times throughout the second half due to Partizan ultras continuing to riot despite increased police presence around the south stand and even, at one point, pleas of the team's striker Predrag Mijatović sent by the head coach Miloš Milutinović in an attempt of calming them. The match ended 3-1 for Red Star.

=== Dinamo v. Red Star match-fixing allegations ===
On Saturday, 18 May 1991, Dinamo Zagreb hosted champions-elect Red Star Belgrade at Maksimir Stadium. The match was of no competitive importance since Red Star had already clinched the league title as it prepared to travel to Bari for the European Cup Final some ten days later while Dinamo had cemented its hold on the second place that ensured a UEFA Cup spot. However, the match still carried a degree of tension due to pitting a marquee Croatian side versus a marquee Serbian at a time when ethnic conflicts, some of them deadly, had started taking place in the Socialist Republic of Croatia, and especially in light of the fact this was the first time the two teams met at Maksimir following the previous season's Dinamo–Red Star riot in the stands, with that match being called off.

This time the match began as scheduled and finished without interruption with Red Star going 0–2 in front before Dinamo mounted a spirited come-back for a 3–2 win at full time. However, more than 20 years later, allegations appeared that the contest had been fixed via confessions from two of the match's protagonists.

Speaking to Globus magazine in September 2012, Robert Prosinečki, Red Star midfielder back in 1991, said his team "let Dinamo win that day".

Prompted by Prosinečki's claims, Ljupko Petrović, Red Star's head coach in 1991, expanded: "We didn't lose that match by arranging with someone from Dinamo beforehand to let them win. No. We were simply forced into losing by the political circles that wanted to ensure Dinamo's win that day. The war had practically already begun, Croatia was about to declare independence, and the match was taking place only a year after the previous incident when Zvonimir Boban assaulted a policeman—our first away match versus Dinamo since then. I remember Franjo Tuđman being at the match and watching it from the luxury box with his cronies and the overall atmosphere within the stadium being extremely hostile such that no result but Dinamo's win was going to be acceptable. We got up 0-2, but towards the end of the first half Dinamo got a penalty on a scandalous and very obvious dive by Davor Šuker. Later, they managed to tie the score. At halftime I protested vehemently with the referee, a Montenegrin guy whose name I can't recall at the moment, and from what he told me it was apparent between the lines that it had already been decided we had to lose that match for political reasons. Because Tuđman is sitting in the stands and because he doesn't want a Serbian team winning in the middle of Zagreb right in front of his eyes at a time when he's creating an independent state. I got thrown out of the match, we conceded once more, we lost the match and that's the whole story".

== League table ==
Pos	Team	Pld	W	PKW	PKL	L	GF	GA	GD	Pts	Qualification or relegation
1	Red Star Belgrade (C)	36	25	4	2	5	88	35	+53	54	Qualification for European Cup first round
2	Dinamo Zagreb (Note: After the season, Croatian and Slovenian clubs left the Yugoslav federation and formed their own leagues. Dinamo Zagreb, Hajduk Split, Osijek and Rijeka joined 1992 Prva HNL, while Olimpija joined 1991–92 Slovenian PrvaLiga.)	36	20	6	4	6	72	36	+36	46	Qualification for UEFA Cup first round and Prva HNL
3	Partizan	36	18	5	3	10	62	36	+26	41	Qualification for UEFA Cup first round
4	Proleter Zrenjanin	36	17	1	3	15	50	49	+1	35	Qualification for Intertoto Cup
5	Borac Banja Luka	36	14	7	4	11	42	38	+4	35	
6	Hajduk Split	36	15	3	6	12	49	38	+11	33	Qualification for Cup Winners' Cup first round and Prva HNL
7	Vojvodina	36	14	5	4	13	47	52	−5	33	
8	Rad	36	14	4	3	15	42	34	+8	32	
9	Osijek	36	14	4	2	16	52	57	−5	32	Qualification for Prva HNL
10	Radnički Niš	36	14	4	1	17	35	49	−14	32	
11	Sarajevo	36	13	5	5	13	37	48	−11	31	
12	Velež	36	12	6	4	14	54	55	−1	30	
13	Zemun	36	12	6	4	14	40	53	−13	30	
14	Olimpija	36	14	2	1	19	41	59	−18	30	Qualification for Slovenian PrvaLiga
15	Rijeka	36	13	3	7	13	33	25	+8	29	Qualification for Prva HNL
16	Željezničar	36	11	7	6	12	35	41	−6	29	
17	Budućnost	36	13	2	4	17	43	48	−5	28	
18	Sloboda Tuzla	36	11	1	6	18	36	56	−20	23	
19	Spartak Subotica	36	1	2	8	25	25	74	−49	4	

Source: rsssf.org
Rules for classification: 1) points; 2) goal difference; 3) number of goals scored.
(C) Champion

== Results ==
Results in brackets indicate the results from penalty shoot-outs whenever games were drawn.

Home \ Away	BBL	BUD	DIN	HAJ	OLI	OSI	PAR	PRO	RAD	RNI	RSB	RIJ	SAR	SLO	SPA	VEL	VOJ	ZEM	ŽEL
Borac Banja Luka		3–1	1–1^{(6–5)}	0–2	2–0	3–0	0–0^{(3–4)}	2–0	2–1	0–2	2–2^{(6–5)}	0–0^{(4–3)}	3–0	3–2	2–0	1–0	1–0	2–0	2–1
Budućnost	3–0		1–0	1–0	1–1^{(2–4)}	1–1^{(2–4)}	2–1	1–0	1–4	2–0	2–0	2–0	4–0	3–1	2–0	2–3	0–1	1–1^{(2–4)}	1–2
Dinamo Zagreb	2–1	6–0		1–1^{(4–3)}	3–0	1–1^{(5–6)}	0–0^{(4–3)}	4–1	2–1	2–0	3–2	3–1	8–1	3–1	3–1	2–1	2–2^{(7–6)}	2–0	2–1
Hajduk Split	1–1^{(3–4)}	1–0	1–2		2–0	3–0	0–3 (Note: Match awarded after it was abandoned due to the riots at the Poljud stadium.)	3–0	4–2	3–0	1–1^{(3–5)}	1–1^{(5–6)}	2–0	1–0	3–0	1–1^{(3–1)}	1–1^{(2–4)}	2–1	1–1^{(4–2)}
Olimpija	1–2	2–1	1–3	2–1		1–0	0–1	1–0	1–0	1–1^{(3–4)}	0–6	2–1	1–0	1–3	5–0	1–3	4–2	2–1	3–0
Osijek	2–0	1–1^{(3–4)}	2–1	0–1	4–0		3–2	4–1	0–3	2–1	2–0	2–0	1–0	1–2	5–2	2–1	3–1	4–1	1–1^{(2–1)}
Partizan	2–2^{(4–3)}	2–1	2–1	4–0	1–0	4–0		0–2	0–0^{(5–4)}	3–1	1–1^{(3–5)}	1–2	2–0	3–1	1–1^{(4–2)}	5–0	3–0	4–1	3–0
Proleter Zrenjanin	3–0	2–1	3–1	2–3	1–1^{(4–5)}	2–0	2–2^{(2–3)}		2–1	1–0	0–2	2–1	5–0	2–0	0–1	3–2	1–1^{(7–6)}	2–0	3–0
Rad	1–0	1–1^{(3–2)}	0–2	1–0	2–0	4–0	2–1	0–1		1–0	0–1	0–1	0–0^{(4–5)}	3–0	2–1	1–0	2–0	2–1	2–0
Radnički Niš	2–0	1–0	1–1^{(5–4)}	1–0	1–2	3–0	0–3	2–1	0–0^{(3–4)}		0–4	1–0	2–0	1–1^{(5–3)}	2–0	4–2	3–0	1–0	1–0
Red Star	2–0	4–1	3–1	1–0	2–1	5–1	3–1	1–2	2–0	6–0		2–1	4–1	4–3	4–0	2–0	2–1	5–1	3–1
Rijeka	0–0^{(9–10)}	1–0	0–0^{(3–1)}	0–0^{(1–3)}	1–0	2–0	3–0	3–0	0–0^{(6–5)}	3–0	0–0^{(1–3)}		2–0	0–1	3–0	1–0	3–0	0–1	1–1^{(1–4)}
Sarajevo	1–0	1–0	0–0^{(4–5)}	1–1^{(4–2)}	2–0	2–0	1–0	3–1	1–1^{(2–4)}	3–0	3–2	1–0		0–0^{(6–5)}	4–1	0–0^{(4–3)}	1–0	1–0	1–1^{(2–4)}
Sloboda Tuzla	0–0^{(10–11)}	2–1	0–3	2–1	0–1	0–5	3–1	1–2	2–1	1–0	0–1	1–0	0–4		2–2^{(4–2)}	0–0^{(6–7)}	1–2	1–1^{(4–5)}	1–0
Spartak Subotica	1–1^{(4–5)}	2–3	0–0^{(2–4)}	0–1	0–2	3–3^{(1–4)}	0–1	0–1	0–0^{(5–6)}	1–2	1–2	0–1	1–1^{(2–4)}	1–3		1–1^{(3–4)}	1–2	0–0^{(5–4)}	1–2
Velež	2–4	2–0	1–2	4–3	3–1	1–0	0–1	5–2	3–2	2–0	3–3^{(5–3)}	1–0	0–0^{(5–4)}	1–0	5–2		0–1	2–2^{(4–5)}	1–1^{(3–4)}
Vojvodina	1–1^{(7–6)}	2–0	3–1	0–2	4–3	1–0	1–2	0–0^{(4–2)}	2–1	1–0	1–1^{(4–5)}	1–1^{(4–2)}	4–3	2–0	3–0	1–1^{(2–4)}		4–3	0–0^{(4–3)}
Zemun	1–0	0–2	1–1^{(6–7)}	1–0	2–0	2–1	2–2^{(4–2)}	1–0	2–1	2–2^{(2–4)}	1–3	0–0^{(3–1)}	1–0	1–0	2–1	3–3^{(4–5)}	2–1		1–0
Željezničar	1–1^{(6–5)}	0–0^{(1–3)}	1–3	3–2	3–0	1–1^{[3–2)}	1–0	2–0	1–0	1–0	0–2	2–0	1–1^{(4–3)}	1–1^{(4–2)}	0–0^{(2–3)}	1–0	3–1	1–1^{(2–3)}	

Source: DataSoccer.it
Legend: Blue = home team win; Yellow = draw; Red = away team win.

== Winning squad ==
Champions: Red Star Belgrade
Player	League	
Player	Matches	Goals
(Socialist Federal Republic of Yugoslavia) Vlada Stošić	35	4
(Romania) Miodrag Belodedić	34	1
(Socialist Federal Republic of Yugoslavia) Stevan Stojanović (goalkeeper)	33	0
(Socialist Federal Republic of Yugoslavia) Darko Pančev	32	34
(Socialist Federal Republic of Yugoslavia) Vladimir Jugović	32	7
(Socialist Federal Republic of Yugoslavia) Ilija Najdoski	32	2
(Socialist Federal Republic of Yugoslavia) Duško Radinović	30	0
(Socialist Federal Republic of Yugoslavia) Robert Prosinečki	29	11
(Socialist Federal Republic of Yugoslavia) Dragiša Binić	27	13
(Socialist Federal Republic of Yugoslavia) Slobodan Marović	27	1
(Socialist Federal Republic of Yugoslavia) Refik Šabanadžović	26	0
(Socialist Federal Republic of Yugoslavia) Dejan Savićević	25	8
(Socialist Federal Republic of Yugoslavia) Siniša Mihajlović (Note: bought from FK Vojvodina January '91)	14	1
(Socialist Federal Republic of Yugoslavia) Ivica Momčilović	13	0
(Socialist Federal Republic of Yugoslavia) Rade Tošić	11	0
(Socialist Federal Republic of Yugoslavia) Ljubiša Milojević	8	1
(Socialist Federal Republic of Yugoslavia) Goran Jurić (Note: sold to Celta de Vigo in December 1990)	8	0
(Socialist Federal Republic of Yugoslavia) Goran Vasilijević	7	0
(Socialist Federal Republic of Yugoslavia) Dejan Joksimović	5	0
(Socialist Federal Republic of Yugoslavia) Ivan Adžić	4	1
(Socialist Federal Republic of Yugoslavia) Vladan Lukić	4	1
(Socialist Federal Republic of Yugoslavia) Enes Bešić	3	0
(Socialist Federal Republic of Yugoslavia) Milić Jovanović (goalkeeper)	3	0
(Socialist Federal Republic of Yugoslavia) Slaviša Čula	2	0
(Socialist Federal Republic of Yugoslavia) Duško Savić	2	0
(Socialist Federal Republic of Yugoslavia) Đorđe Aćimović	1	0
(Socialist Federal Republic of Yugoslavia) Aleksandar Ilić	1	0
(Socialist Federal Republic of Yugoslavia) Mitar Mrkela (Note: sold to FC Twente in early fall 1990)	1	0
(Socialist Federal Republic of Yugoslavia) Milorad Ratković	1	0
Head coach: Ljupko Petrović

== Top scorers ==
Rank	Player	Club	Goals
1	(Socialist Federal Republic of Yugoslavia) Darko Pančev	Red Star	34
2	(Socialist Federal Republic of Yugoslavia) Davor Šuker	Dinamo Zagreb	22
3	(Socialist Federal Republic of Yugoslavia) Zvonimir Boban	Dinamo Zagreb	15
4	(Socialist Federal Republic of Yugoslavia) Ljubomir Vorkapić	Vojvodina	14
4	(Socialist Federal Republic of Yugoslavia) Predrag Mijatović	Partizan	14
6	(Socialist Federal Republic of Yugoslavia) Dragiša Binić	Red Star	13
6	(Socialist Federal Republic of Yugoslavia) Anto Drobnjak	Budućnost	13
6	(Socialist Federal Republic of Yugoslavia) Meho Kodro	Velež	13
9	(Socialist Federal Republic of Yugoslavia) Vladimir Gudelj	Velež	12
10	(Socialist Federal Republic of Yugoslavia) Zoran Slišković	Željezničar	11
10	(Socialist Federal Republic of Yugoslavia) Robert Prosinečki	Red Star	11
10	(Socialist Federal Republic of Yugoslavia) Goran Vlaović	Osijek	11
10	(Socialist Federal Republic of Yugoslavia) Zoran Kuntić	Spartak Subotica	11

== See also ==
- 1990–91 Yugoslav Second League
- 1990–91 Yugoslav Cup
- Dinamo Zagreb–Red Star Belgrade riot
