= 1992–93 Croatian First Football League =

Croatian First Football League
- Season: 1992–93
- Champions: Croatia Zagreb; 1st Croatian title 5th domestic title
- Relegated: None
- Champions League: Croatia Zagreb
- Cup Winners' Cup: Hajduk Split
- Matches: 240
- Goals: 594 (2.48 per match)
- Top goalscorer: Goran Vlaović (23)
- Biggest home win: Croatia Zagreb 8–1 Belišće
- Biggest away win: Zadar 1–4 NK Zagreb; Belišće 1–4 Croatia Zagreb; Šibenik 1–4 Rijeka; Šibenik 0–3 Osijek
- Highest scoring: Croatia Zagreb 8–2 Radnik
- Average attendance: 4,264

The 1992–93 Croatian First Football League, also known as 1. HNL, was the second season of the top football league in Croatia since its establishment in 1992 after Croatia gained independence from Yugoslavia. Games were played from 23 August 1992 to 12 June 1993.

HAŠK Građanski (renamed Croatia Zagreb in mid-season), present-day Dinamo Zagreb, won their first Prva HNL championship title. Goran Vlaović of HAŠK was the league's top goalscorer with 22 goals scored. At the end of the season no teams were relegated since it was decided that the league would expand to 18 clubs for the 1993–94 season.

== Clubs ==
Locations of teams in 1992–93 Prva HNL

Club	City / Town	Stadium	1992 result
Belišće	Belišće	Gradski stadion Belišće	
Cibalia	Vinkovci	Stadion HNK Cibalia	9th in 1.HNL
Croatia Zagreb^{1}	Zagreb	Stadion Maksimir	5th in 1.HNL
Dubrovnik	Dubrovnik	Stadion Lapad	11th in 1.HNL
Hajduk Split	Split	Stadion Poljud	1st in 1.HNL
Inker Zaprešić	Zaprešić	Stadion Inkera	4th in 1.HNL
Istra Pula	Pula	Stadion Aldo Drosina	7th in 1.HNL
Osijek	Osijek	Stadion Gradski vrt	3rd in 1.HNL
Pazinka	Pazin	Gradski stadion Pazin	1st in 2.HNL-West
Radnik Velika Gorica	Velika Gorica	Stadion Radnik	1st in 2.HNL-Center
Rijeka	Rijeka	Stadion Kantrida	6th in 1.HNL
Segesta	Sisak	Gradski stadion Sisak	4th in 2.HNL-Center
Šibenik	Šibenik	Stadion Šubićevac	12th in 1.HNL
Varteks	Varaždin	Stadion Varteks	8th in 1.HNL
Zadar	Zadar	Stadion Stanovi	10th in 1.HNL
NK Zagreb	Zagreb	Stadion Kranjčevićeva	2nd in 1.HNL

== League table ==
Croatia was admitted to the UEFA at the end of the season. It obtained a place in the preliminary rounds of the two major European competitions, while it was too late for the third one.

Pos	Team	Pld	W	D	L	GF	GA	GD	Pts	Qualification
1	Croatia Zagreb (C)	30	21	7	2	84	27	+57	49	Qualification to Champions League preliminary round
2	Hajduk Split	30	16	10	4	53	27	+26	42	Qualification to Cup Winners' Cup first round
3	NK Zagreb	30	15	10	5	50	27	+23	40	
4	Rijeka	30	14	11	5	41	24	+17	39	
5	Cibalia	30	11	9	10	31	30	+1	31	
6	Osijek	30	11	7	12	40	42	−2	29	
7	Varteks	30	10	9	11	38	47	−9	29	
8	Istra Pula	30	12	4	14	32	35	−3	28	
9	Inker Zaprešić	30	9	9	12	35	31	+4	27	
10	Segesta	30	10	5	15	31	44	−13	25	
11	Pazinka	30	7	11	12	20	28	−8	25	
12	Zadar	30	9	7	14	30	48	−18	25	
13	Radnik Velika Gorica	30	9	7	14	30	52	−22	25	
14	Dubrovnik	30	9	7	14	24	37	−13	25	
15	Belišće	30	8	9	13	34	50	−16	25	
16	Šibenik	30	4	8	18	21	45	−24	16	

Source: RSSSF.org
Rules for classification: 1st points; 2nd head-to-head points.
(C) Champions

== Results ==
Home \ Away	BEL	CIB	CZG	DBK	HAJ	INK	IST	OSI	PAZ	RVG	RIJ	SEG	ŠIB	VAR	ZAD	ZAG
Belišće		1–0	1–4	2–0	1–3	2–1	2–1	2–0	0–0	2–3	1–1	0–0	2–1	4–0	3–1	2–2
Cibalia	2–0		1–2	1–0	2–2	2–0	1–0	1–0	1–0	2–3	1–1	3–0	2–2	2–2	2–0	0–0
Croatia Zagreb	8–1	0–0		3–1	1–1	2–0	3–1	6–1	3–1	8–2	4–2	6–1	2–0	5–0	4–0	2–2
Dubrovnik	1–0	0–0	0–0		0–2	0–0	4–0	4–0	1–0	1–1	2–0	1–0	1–1	2–0	0–0	0–0
Hajduk Split	1–1	3–0	2–1	3–0		1–0	2–0	3–2	0–0	3–1	3–0	3–0	1–1	2–2	5–1	2–1
Inker Zaprešić	2–0	4–1	0–1	4–0	0–1		2–0	0–0	4–1	1–1	1–1	2–1	0–1	0–0	1–0	1–2
Istra Pula	3–0	2–0	0–1	1–0	2–0	0–0		1–0	1–0	1–1	2–1	2–0	3–1	1–1	5–2	1–3
Osijek	4–1	2–0	1–3	3–1	3–2	1–1	1–2		1–1	3–2	1–1	4–0	2–0	1–0	2–0	0–0
Pazinka	2–1	0–0	0–2	4–1	0–0	0–0	2–1	0–0		0–0	0–0	2–1	1–0	0–2	1–0	2–0
Radnik Velika Gorica	0–0	0–2	1–1	1–0	0–2	1–1	1–0	3–1	1–0		1–2	0–1	3–0	2–1	1–0	1–2
Rijeka	1–1	1–0	2–1	5–0	0–0	2–1	0–0	2–0	2–0	3–0		1–1	1–0	1–1	2–0	1–0
Segesta	4–1	2–1	1–3	3–0	1–1	1–3	2–0	0–1	1–0	3–0	0–2		2–0	3–0	1–1	1–0
Šibenik	1–1	1–0	1–2	0–1	0–1	2–0	0–1	0–3	1–1	3–0	1–4	0–0		0–2	2–2	1–1
Varteks	2–1	1–2	3–3	2–1	4–3	2–3	1–0	2–2	1–0	1–0	0–1	1–0	1–0		1–1	1–1
Zadar	2–1	1–2	1–3	1–0	0–0	1–0	3–1	2–1	1–1	2–0	1–1	1–0	3–1	2–1		1–4
NK Zagreb	0–0	0–0	0–0	0–2	3–1	4–3	1–0	2–0	2–1	6–0	1–0	5–1	2–0	4–3	2–0	

Source: RSSSF.org
Legend: Blue = home team win; Yellow = draw; Red = away team win.

== Season statistics ==
- Most goals in a match: 10 goals – Croatia Zagreb 8–2 Radnik Velika Gorica (1 November 1992).
- Widest winning margin: 7 goals – Croatia Zagreb 8–1 Belišće (25 April 1993).
- First hat-trick of the season: Dinko Livada for Radnik Velika Gorica against Osijek (27 September 1992).
- Most goals scored by one player in a match: 4 goals – Goran Vlaović for Croatia Zagreb against Belišće (25 April 1993).

== Top goalscorers ==
Rank	Player	Club	Goals
1	(Croatia) Goran Vlaović	Croatia Zagreb	23
2	(Croatia) Igor Cvitanović	Croatia Zagreb	15
3	(Croatia) Ardian Kozniku	Hajduk Split	14
4	(Croatia) Robert Špehar	Osijek / NK Zagreb	13
5	(Croatia) Ivan Cvjetković	Inker Zaprešić / Segesta	12
6	(Croatia) Željko Adžić	Croatia Zagreb	10
6	(Croatia) Alen Petrović	Osijek	10
6	(Croatia) Mario Stanić	Croatia Zagreb	10
9	(Bosnia and Herzegovina) Bakir Beširević	Osijek	9
9	(Croatia) Joško Popović	NK Zagreb	9
9	(Croatia) Giovanni Rosso	Zadar	9

=== European competitions ===
Croatian clubs were not eligible to compete in European competitions this season, as the Croatian Football Federation did not join UEFA until June 16, 1993.

== See also ==
- 1992–93 Croatian Football Cup
