= 1992–93 HNK Hajduk Split season =

Hajduk Split
1992–93 season
- Chairman: Stjepan Jukić Peladić; Nadan Vidošević
- Manager: Stanko Poklepović; Ivan Katalinić
- Prva HNL: 2nd
- Croatian Cup: Winners
- Croatian Supercup: Winners
- Top goalscorer: League: Ardian Kozniku (14); All: Ardian Kozniku (17)
- Highest home attendance: 45,000 vs Croatia Zagreb (19 May 1993)
- Lowest home attendance: 300 vs Kraljevica (18 November 1992)
- Average home league attendance: 6,033

The 1992–93 season was the 82nd season in Hajduk Split's history and their second in the Prva HNL. Their 1st-place finish in the 1992 season meant it was their 2nd successive season playing in the Prva HNL.

== Competitions ==
=== Overall record ===
Performance by competition
Competition	Starting round	Final position/round	First match	Last match
Prva HNL	—	Runners-up	23 August 1992	13 June 1993
Croatian Football Cup	First round	Winners	23 September 1992	2 June 1993
Super Cup	—	Winners	18 July 1992	

Statistics by competition
Competition	Pld	W	D	L	GF	GA	GD	Win%
Prva HNL	30	16	10	4	53	27	+26	53.33
Croatian Football Cup	10	7	1	2	23	8	+15	70.00
Super Cup	1	0	1	0	0	0	+0	0.00
Total	41	23	12	6	76	35	+41	56.10

=== Prva HNL ===
==== Classification ====
Pos	Team	Pld	W	D	L	GF	GA	GD	Pts	Qualification
1	Croatia Zagreb (C)	30	21	7	2	84	27	+57	49	Qualification to Champions League preliminary round
2	Hajduk Split	30	16	10	4	53	27	+26	42	Qualification to Cup Winners' Cup first round
3	NK Zagreb	30	15	10	5	50	27	+23	40	
4	Rijeka	30	14	11	5	41	24	+17	39	
5	Cibalia	30	11	9	10	31	30	+1	31	

Source: RSSSF.org
Rules for classification: 1st points; 2nd head-to-head points.
(C) Champions

==== Results summary ====
Overall								Home						Away					
Pld	W	D	L	GF	GA	GD	Pts	W	D	L	GF	GA	GD	W	D	L	GF	GA	GD
30	16	10	4	53	27	+26	58	11	4	0	34	10	+24	5	6	4	19	17	+2

Last updated: 13 June 1993.
Source: Sportnet.hr

==== Results by round ====
Round	1	2	3	4	5	6	7	8	9	10	11	12	13	14	15	16	17	18	19	20	21	22	23	24	25	26	27	28	29	30
Ground	H	A	H	A	H	A	H	A	H	H	A	H	A	H	A	A	H	A	H	A	H	A	H	A	A	H	A	H	A	H
Result	W	W	W	W	W	L	W	L	W	W	D	D	D	D	W	D	D	D	D	L	W	W	W	D	W	W	L	W	D	W
Position	4	2	1	1	1	1	1	3	2	2	2	2	2	2	2	2	2	2	2	3	3	3	2	2	2	2	2	2	2	2

Source: Competitive matches
A = Away; H = Home; W = Win; D = Draw; L = Loss

==== Results by opponent ====
Team	Results		Points
Team	1	2	Points
Belišće	3–1	1–1	4
Cibalia	3–0	2–2	4
Croatia Zagreb	1–1	2–1	4
Dubrovnik	3–1	2–0	6
Inker Zaprešić	1–0	1–0	6
Istra	0–2	2–0	3
Osijek	2–3	3–2	3
Pazinka	0–0	0–0	2
Radnik	3–1	2–0	6
Rijeka	0–0	3–0	4
Segesta	3–0	1–1	4
Šibenik	1–0	1–1	4
Varteks	2–2	3–4	1
Zadar	5–1	0–0	4
NK Zagreb	2–1	1–3	3

Source: 1992–93 Croatian First Football League article

== Matches ==
=== Croatian Supercup ===
Match	Date	Venue	Opponent	Score	Attendance	Hajduk Scorers	Report
1	18 Jul	N	Inker Zaprešić	0–0 (3 – 1 p)	10,000		HRnogomet.com

Source: hajduk.hr

=== Prva HNL ===
Round	Date	Venue	Opponent	Score	Attendance	Hajduk Scorers	Report
1	23 Aug	H	Cibalia	3–0	4,000	Bilić (2), Kozniku	HRnogomet.com
2	30 Aug	A	Šibenik	1–0	4,500	Kozniku	HRnogomet.com
3	6 Sep	H	Zadar	5–1	5,000	Balajić, Andrijašević, Kozniku, Mornar (2)	HRnogomet.com
4	13 Sep	A	Belišće	3–1	4,000	Jeličić, Mornar (2)	Slobodna Dalmacija
5	20 Sep	H	NK Zagreb	2–1	15,000	Andrijašević, Kozniku	HRnogomet.com
6	27 Sep	A	Istra	0–2	6,000		HRnogomet.com
7	4 Oct	H	Radnik	3–1	4,000	Kozniku, Andrijašević (2)	HRnogomet.com
8	11 Oct	A	Osijek	2–3	10,000	Andrijašević, Mornar	HRnogomet.com
9	18 Oct	H	Segesta	3–0	3,000	Bilić, Kozniku, Andrijašević	HRnogomet.com
10	25 Oct	H	Dubrovnik	3–1	4,000	Kozniku (2), Markovac	HRnogomet.com
11	1 Nov	A	Rijeka	0–0	7,000		HRnogomet.com
12	9 Nov	H	Varteks	2–2	4,000	Erceg, Andrijašević	HRnogomet.com
13	15 Nov	A	HAŠK Građanski	1–1	50,000	Erceg	HRnogomet.com
14	22 Nov	H	Pazinka	0–0	3,000		HRnogomet.com
15	28 Nov	A	Inker Zaprešić	1–0	5,000	Erceg	HRnogomet.com
16	7 Mar	A	Cibalia	2–2	5,000	Miše, Bilić	HRnogomet.com
17	14 Mar	H	Šibenik	1–1	2,500	Kozniku	HRnogomet.com
18	21 Mar	A	Zadar	0–0	9,000		HRnogomet.com
19	28 Mar	H	Belišće	1–1	2,000	Španjić	HRnogomet.com
20	4 Apr	A	NK Zagreb	1–3	17,000	Erceg	HRnogomet.com
21	10 Apr	H	Istra	2–0	3,000	Rapaić, Kozniku	HRnogomet.com
22	18 Apr	A	Radnik	2–0	7,000	Erceg, Kozniku	HRnogomet.com
23	25 Apr	H	Osijek	3–2	5,000	Miše, Kozniku, Rapaić	HRnogomet.com
24	2 May	A	Segesta	1–1	8,000	Kozniku	HRnogomet.com
25	9 May	A	Dubrovnik	2–0	4,500	Bilić, Erceg	HRnogomet.com
26	16 May	H	Rijeka	3–0	5,000	Mornar, Jeličić, Rapaić	HRnogomet.com
27	23 May	A	Varteks	3–4	10,000	Erceg, Mornar, Novaković	HRnogomet.com
28	30 May	H	Croatia Zagreb	2–1	30,000	Rapaić, Kozniku	HRnogomet.com
29	6 Jun	A	Pazinka	0–0	5,000		HRnogomet.com
30	13 Jun	H	Inker Zaprešić	1–0	1,000	Novaković	HRnogomet.com

Source: hajduk.hr

=== Croatian Cup ===
Round	Date	Venue	Opponent	Score	Attendance	Hajduk Scorers	Report
R1	23 Sep	H	RNK Split	0–3	500		HRnogomet.com
R1	7 Oct	A	RNK Split	4–0	5,000	Erceg (2), Andrijašević, Jeličić	HRnogomet.com
R2	18 Nov	H	Kraljevica	1–0	300	Miše	Slobodna Dalmacija
R2	6 Dec	A	Kraljevica	4–0	2,000	Bilić (2), Erceg (2)	HRnogomet.com
QF	24 Mar	H	Osijek	2–0	3,000	Bilić, Miše	Slobodna Dalmacija
QF	7 Apr	A	Osijek	3–0	6,000	Vladislavić, Erceg, Mornar	HRnogomet.com
SF	21 Apr	H	Zadar	2–0	5,000	Balajić, Rapaić	HRnogomet.com
SF	5 May	AR	Zadar	2–2	1,000	Novaković, Miše	HRnogomet.com
Final	19 May	H	Croatia Zagreb	4–1	45,000	Kozniku (2), Jeličić, Novaković	HRnogomet.com
Final	2 Jun	A	Croatia Zagreb	1–2	45,000	Kozniku	HRnogomet.com

Source: hajduk.hr

== Player seasonal records ==
=== Top scorers ===
Rank	Name	League	Cup	Total
1	(Croatia) Ardian Kozniku	14	3	17
2	(Croatia) Tomislav Erceg	7	5	12
3	(Croatia) Stjepan Andrijašević	7	1	8
3	(Croatia) Slaven Bilić	5	3	8
3	(Croatia) Ivica Mornar	7	1	8
6	(Croatia) Milan Rapaić	4	1	5
7	(Croatia) Joško Jeličić	2	2	4
7	(Croatia) Mario Novaković	2	2	4
9	(Croatia) Ante Miše	2	1	3
10	(Croatia) Stipe Balajić	1	1	2
11	(Australia) Robert Markovac	1	–	1
11	(Croatia) Joško Španjić	1	–	1
11	(Croatia) Robert Vladislavić	–	1	1
	TOTALS	53	21	74

Source: Competitive matches

== See also ==
- 1992–93 Croatian First Football League
- 1992–93 Croatian Football Cup

== External sources ==
- 1992–93 Prva HNL at HRnogomet.com
- 1992–93 Croatian Cup at HRnogomet.com
