= List of Croatia national football team managers =

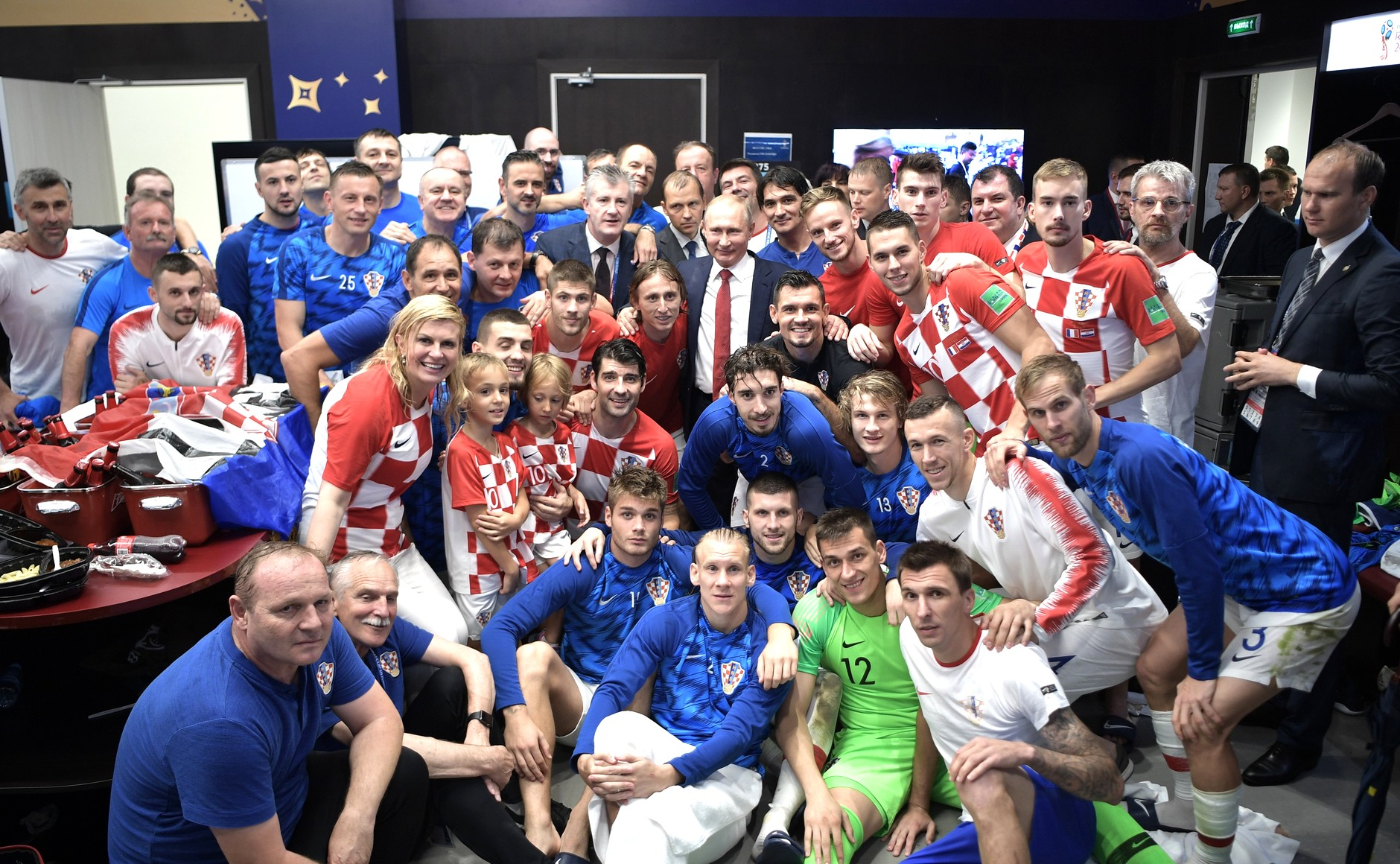
Croatia's management team alongside their players after the 2018 FIFA World Cup, where they secured their second World Cup medal.

This list of the head coaches of the Croatia national football team reflect their collective statistics and achievements for Croatia and the nation's efforts in football. The early 1990s coincided with the independence of Croatia during which time Dražan Jerković, Stanko Poklepović and Vlatko Marković were its head coaches in the modern era. Miroslav Blažević took over in 1994, embarking on the nation's debut into international competition. Blažević took Croatia to the quarterfinals of 1996 UEFA European Championship and led them to third-place at the 1998 FIFA World Cup, securing their first World Cup medal.

In the 2000s and early 2010s, Mirko Jozić, Otto Barić, Zlatko Kranjčar, Slaven Bilić, Igor Štimac, Niko Kovač and Ante Čačić led the team. Bilić led the nation to their second 2008 European Championship quarterfinals and returned to the team in 2026. From 2017 to 2026, Zlatko Dalić led the team to back-to-back World Cup medals, finishing second and third in the 2018 and 2022 FIFA World Cups. He secured their first European medal with second place in the 2023 UEFA Nations League and first exhibition championship by winning the 2024 FIFA Series.

== List ==
The following table provides a summary of the complete record of each Croatia manager's results in the FIFA World Cup, the UEFA European Championship, and the UEFA Nations League.

Coach	Nat	First match	Last match	Pld	W	D	L	Win %	Tournaments
Jozo Jakopić	(Banovina of Croatia)	2 April 1940	8 December 1940	4	2	1	1	50.00%	
Rudolf Hitrec	(Independent State of Croatia)	15 June 1941		1	0	0	1	0.00%	
Bogdan Cuvaj	(Independent State of Croatia)	7 September 1941	6 June 1943	13	6	3	4	46.15%	
Bernard Hügl	(Independent State of Croatia)	9 April 1944		1	1	0	0	100.00%	
Bruno Knežević, Leo Lemešić, Franjo Wölfl	(Socialist Republic of Croatia)	12 September 1956		1	1	0	0	100.00%	
Dražan Jerković	(Croatia)	17 October 1990	19 June 1991	3	3	0	0	100.00%	
Stanko Poklepović	(Croatia)	5 July 1992	22 October 1992	4	1	1	2	25.00%	
Vlatko Marković	(Croatia)	25 June 1993		1	1	0	0	100.00%	
Miroslav Blažević	(Croatia)	23 March 1994	11 October 2000	72	33	24	15	45.83%	1996 European Championship – Quarter-finals; 1998 World Cup – Third place 2000 European Championship – Failed to qualify
Tomislav Ivić (c) (Note: In September 1994, national team manager Miroslav Blažević, who was also coaching Croatia Zagreb at the time, was dismissed in a 1994–95 UEFA Cup Winners' Cup match against Auxerre. Blažević was suspended by UEFA for one game and Ivić was appointed as his replacement for the qualifying match against Italy in November 1994 for UEFA Euro 1996.)	(Croatia)	16 November 1994		1	1	0	0	100.00%	
Mirko Jozić	(Croatia)	23 February 2001	13 June 2002	18	9	6	3	50.00%	2002 World Cup – Group stage
Otto Barić	(Croatia)	21 August 2002	21 June 2004	24	11	8	5	45.83%	2004 European Championship – Group stage
Zlatko Kranjčar	(Croatia)	18 August 2004	22 June 2006	25	11	8	6	44.00%	2006 World Cup – Group stage
Slaven Bilić	(Croatia)	16 August 2006	18 June 2012	65	42	15	8	64.62%	2008 European Championship – Quarter-finals; 2010 World Cup – Failed to qualify 2012 European Championship – Group stage
Igor Štimac	(Croatia)	15 August 2012	15 October 2013	15	8	2	5	53.33%	
Niko Kovač	(Croatia)	15 November 2013	6 September 2015	19	10	5	4	52.63%	2014 World Cup – Group stage
Ante Čačić	(Croatia)	10 October 2015	6 October 2017	25	15	6	4	60.00%	2016 European Championship – Round of 16
Zlatko Dalić	(Croatia)	9 October 2017	8 July 2026	111	62	20	29	55.86%	2018 World Cup – Runners-up; 2018–19 UEFA Nations League – Group stage 2020 European Championship – Round of 16; 2020–21 UEFA Nations League – Group stage 2022 World Cup – Third place 2022–23 UEFA Nations League – Runners-up; 2024 European Championship – Group stage 2024 FIFA Series – Champions; 2024–25 UEFA Nations League – Quarter-finals; 2026 World Cup – Round of 32
Slaven Bilić	(Croatia)	13 July 2026							
Total		2 April 1940	8 July 2026	403	217	99	87	53.85%	WC & EC = 14 out of 16

Last updated after World Cup match vs. Portugal on 2 July 2026
Source: Croatian Football Federation
