= 1992 Croatian Football Super Cup =

Hajduk Split	Inker Zaprešić
0	0
- Hajduk Split won 3–1 on penalties
- Date: 18 July 1992
- Venue: Stadion Maksimir, Zagreb
- Referee: Dragutin Poljak (Zagreb)
- Attendance: 10,000

The 1992 Croatian Football Super Cup was the first edition of the Croatian Football Super Cup, a football match contested by the winners of the previous season's Croatian First League and Croatian Football Cup competitions. The match was played on 18 July 1992 at Stadion Maksimir in Zagreb between the 1992 Croatian First League winners Hajduk Split and 1992 Croatian Football Cup winners Inker Zaprešić.

== Match details ==
18 July 1992
20:00 CEST

Hajduk Split	0–0	Inker Zaprešić
	Report (in Croatian)
Penalties
Bilić (penalty scored); Miše (penalty scored); Španjić (penalty missed); Vučević (penalty scored)	3–1	(penalty scored) Soldo; (penalty missed) Perković; (penalty missed) Antolić; (penalty missed) Brlek

Stadion Maksimir, Zagreb
Attendance: 10,000
Referee: Dragutin Poljak (Zagreb)

GK	1	(Croatia) Zoran Slavica
DF	2	(Croatia) Joško Španjić
DF	3	(Croatia) Mario Novaković	(yellow card) 62'
DF	4	(Croatia) Igor Štimac (c)	(yellow card) 59' (yellow-red card)
DF	5	(Croatia) Slaven Bilić	Booked
MF	6	(Croatia) Stjepan Andrijašević	Booked	(substituted off) 65'
MF	7	(Croatia) Milan Rapaić	(substituted off) 89'
MF	8	(Croatia) Ante Miše	Booked
MF	9	(Croatia) Goran Vučević
FW	10	(Croatia) Ivica Mornar	(substituted off) 61'
FW	11	(Federal Republic of Yugoslavia) Ardian Kozniku
Substitutes:
DF	20	(Croatia) Darko Butorović	(substituted on) 61'
DF	14	(Croatia) Stipe Balajić	(substituted on) 65'
MF	14	(Croatia) Ante Ivica	(substituted on) 89'
Manager:
(Croatia) Stanko Poklepović

GK	1	(Croatia) Krešimir Bronić (c)
DF	2	(Croatia) Ivica Antolić
DF	3	(Croatia) Boris Pavić	Booked
DF	4	(Croatia) Damir Kasunović
DF	5	(Croatia) Zvonimir Soldo	Booked
MF	6	(Croatia) Miroslav Šorgić	(substituted off) 57'
MF	7	(Croatia) Krunoslav Jurčić	Booked	(substituted off) 57'
MF	8	(Croatia) Stipić	(substituted off) 57'
MF	9	(Croatia) Josip Omrčen-Čeko	(substituted off) 57'
MF	10	(Croatia) Borimir Perković
FW	11	(Croatia) Nikica Miletić	(substituted off) 69'
Substitutes:
MF	12	(Croatia) Vjekoslav Knez	(substituted on) 57'
MF	13	(Croatia) Zoran Joksović	(substituted on) 57'
FW	14	(Croatia) Uzelac	(substituted on) 57'
FW	15	(Croatia) Franjo Kučko	(substituted on) 57'
DF	16	(Croatia) Zvjezdan Brlek	(substituted on) 69'
Manager:
(Croatia) Ilija Lončarević

Assistant referees:
Mateo Beusan (Dubrovnik)
Stjepan Šarić (Zagreb)

Match rules

- 90 minutes.
- Penalty shoot-out if scores still level; no extra time.
- Five named substitutes.
- Maximum of five substitutions.
