= History of the Croatia national football team =

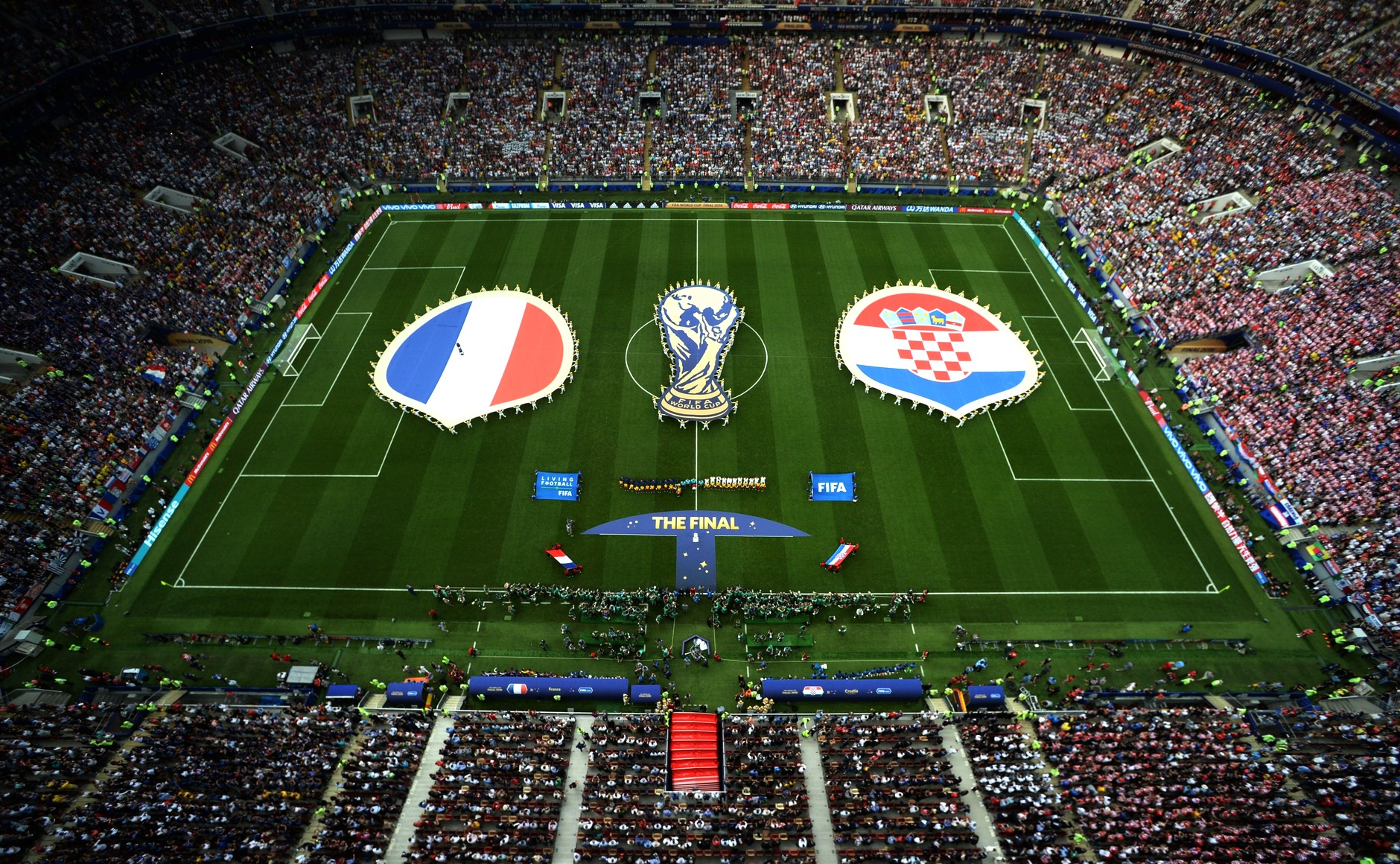
Croatia contested the 2018 World Cup final against France, securing second-place and their second out of three World Cup medals.

The modern Croatia national football team was formed following the independence of Croatia in 1990, with prior history stretching back to the late 19th century. Croatia debuted their modern checkered jersey against the United States in 1990. It was admitted into FIFA in 1992 and UEFA in 1993, three years later participating in their first tournament, Euro 1996. The team has since qualified for every major tournament except UEFA Euro 2000 and the 2010 FIFA World Cup.

At the World Cup, Croatia has finished second once (2018) and third on two occasions (1998, 2022), securing three World Cup medals. Davor Šuker won the Golden Shoe and the Silver Ball in 1998, while Luka Modrić won the Golden Ball in 2018 and the Bronze Ball in 2022. The team has reached the quarter-finals of the UEFA European Championship twice (1996, 2008). They finished second at the UEFA Nations League in 2023, securing their first European medal. Croatia won the 2024 FIFA Series, in their first exhibition championship.

== History ==
=== Official formation ===
Various unofficial sides delineated the early history of Croatian football as Croatia was not an independent entity until the late 20th century. The earliest record of Croatians playing an international match trace to 1907, in Prague, against Slavia, a small historic republic near Northern Italy. The Croatian Football Federation has historically maintained its first official international match as the 2 April 1940 friendly contested by the Banovina of Croatia within Yugoslavia and Switzerland, where the former prevailed 4–0. That year, Jozo Jakopić led the national side representing the Banovina of Croatia in four friendly matches. Following the 1941 Axis invasion of Yugoslavia, Germany and Italy took control of Croatia, forming the Independent State of Croatia and installing Rudolf Hitrec as an unofficial manager for two years. The side played 15 friendly matches from its re-activation in FIFA in 1941 until the end of World War II. In 1945, Croatia returned to Yugoslavia as the People's Republic of Croatia with sides active until 1956. During the nation's pre-independence, Croat footballers played for Yugoslavia at the Summer Olympics, the FIFA World Cup, and the UEFA European Championship from 1956 to 1990.

Croatia debuted their modern checkered jersey – their first international match as an independent country – against the United States on 17 October 1990, winning 2–1. Caretaker manager Dražan Jerković, led the de facto national side before their formal re-admission into FIFA on 3 July 1992, winning two more friendly games against Romania in December 1990 and Slovenia in June 1991. Stanko Poklepović took over team management and led them on an exhibition tour in their debut against Australia, before he was succeeded by Vlatko Marković in April 1993. Croatia gained admission into UEFA in June 1993, three months after qualification for the 1994 World Cup started, missing their window to enter the competition. After winning a match against Ukraine in June 1993, Marković was succeeded by Miroslav Blažević in March 1994.

=== Blažević period (1994–1999) ===

Squad at 1998 World Cup
Coach: Miroslav Blažević

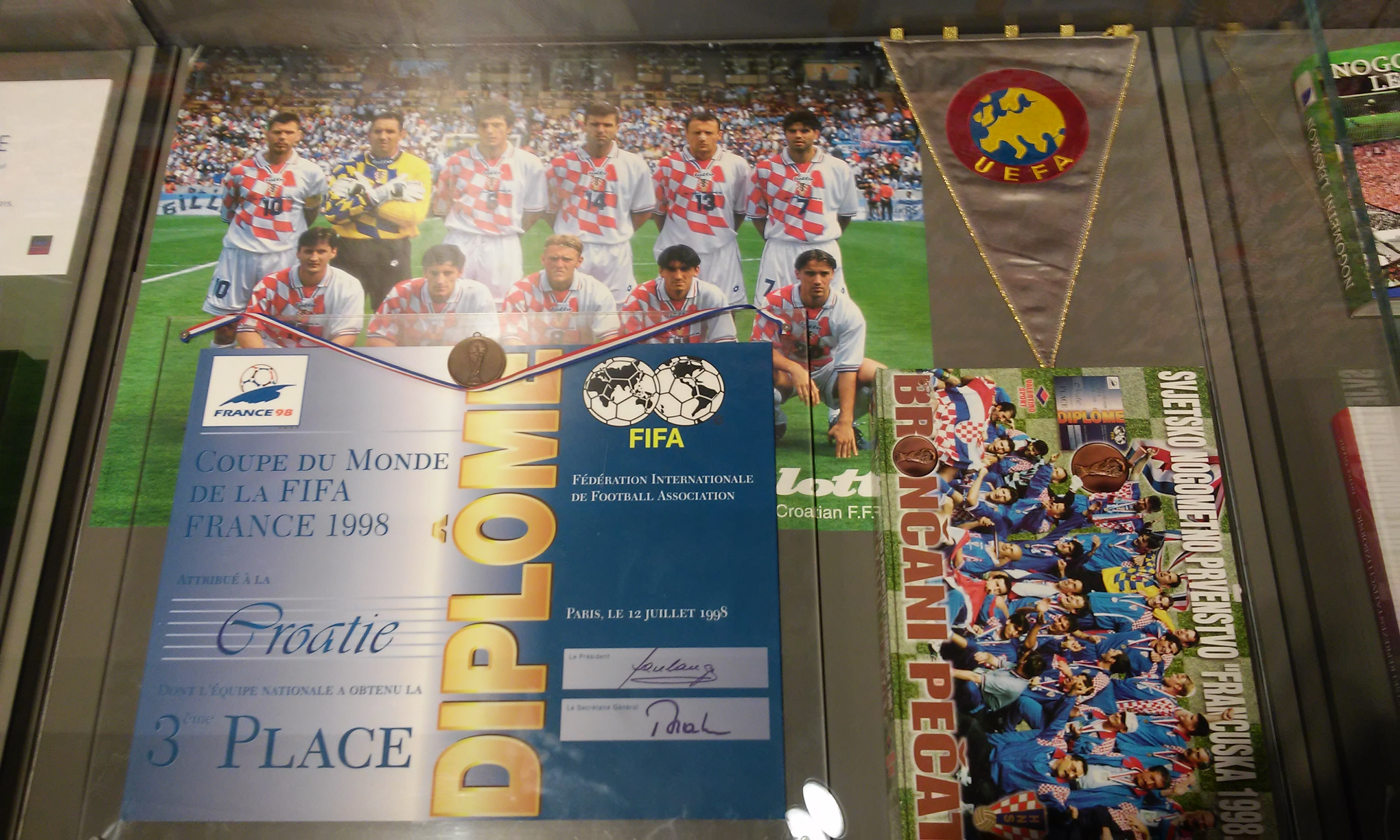
Croatia's third-place certificate and bronze medal for the 1998 World Cup

After the independence of Croatia, the newly formed Croatia entered the FIFA World Rankings in 125th place in March 1994. Blažević launched Croatia's qualifying campaign for Euro 1996 with a 2–0 win over Estonia on 4 September 1994 and a 1–0 away loss to Ukraine on 1 June 1995, their first competitive win and loss. After finishing first in qualifying, the team halved their spot in the World Ranking, ascending to number 62, winning FIFA's 1994 Best Mover of the Year in December 1994. In the Euro 1996 group stage, Goran Vlaović scored the team's first goal at a tournament, a late strike to win 1–0 against Turkey. Croatia then beat reigning champions Denmark 3–0, later losing to Portugal by the same scoreline. The team advanced to the knockout stage and were beaten in the quarter-finals 1–2 by Germany. Croatia's qualifying campaign from 1998 to 1999 for Euro 2000 was unsuccessful as they finished third in their group behind FR Yugoslavia and the Republic of Ireland. Both fixtures against Yugoslavia ended in draws which prevented Croatia from qualifying by one point.

Croatia began their qualification campaign for the 1998 World Cup led by captain Zvonimir Boban with an aggregate victory against Ukraine in the two-legged playoff. In the group stage, Croatia beat both Jamaica and Japan, later losing to Argentina to advance with them to the knockout stage. A 1–0 victory over Romania moved the Croatians to the quarter-finals against Germany. Croatia beat the Germans 3–0 with goals from Robert Jarni, Goran Vlaović and Davor Šuker, all after Christian Wörns had been sent off. They advanced to their first semi-final against hosts France. After a goalless first-half, Croatia led after Aljoša Asanović pushed past Zinedine Zidane to cross a ball downfield to Šuker who scored after a one-on-one with goalkeeper Fabien Barthez. France's defender Lilian Thuram equalized quickly after, and scored another goal later in the game to beat Croatia 2–1. In the third place match, Croatia prevailed against the Netherlands 2–1 to secure bronze and claim their first World Cup medal. Šuker won the Golden Shoe for scoring the most goals in the World Cup: six goals in seven games. The Croatians' performance during the late-1990s propelled them to rank third place in the FIFA World Ranking in January 1999. The team of the 1990s was dubbed the "golden generation" (Note: A portion of this squad (Jarni, Štimac, Boban, Prosinečki and Šuker) previously won the 1987 FIFA World Youth Championship with the Yugoslavia under-20 team.) for their contributions to Croatia's ascension in international football.

=== Jozić, Barić and Kranjčar period (2000–2006) ===
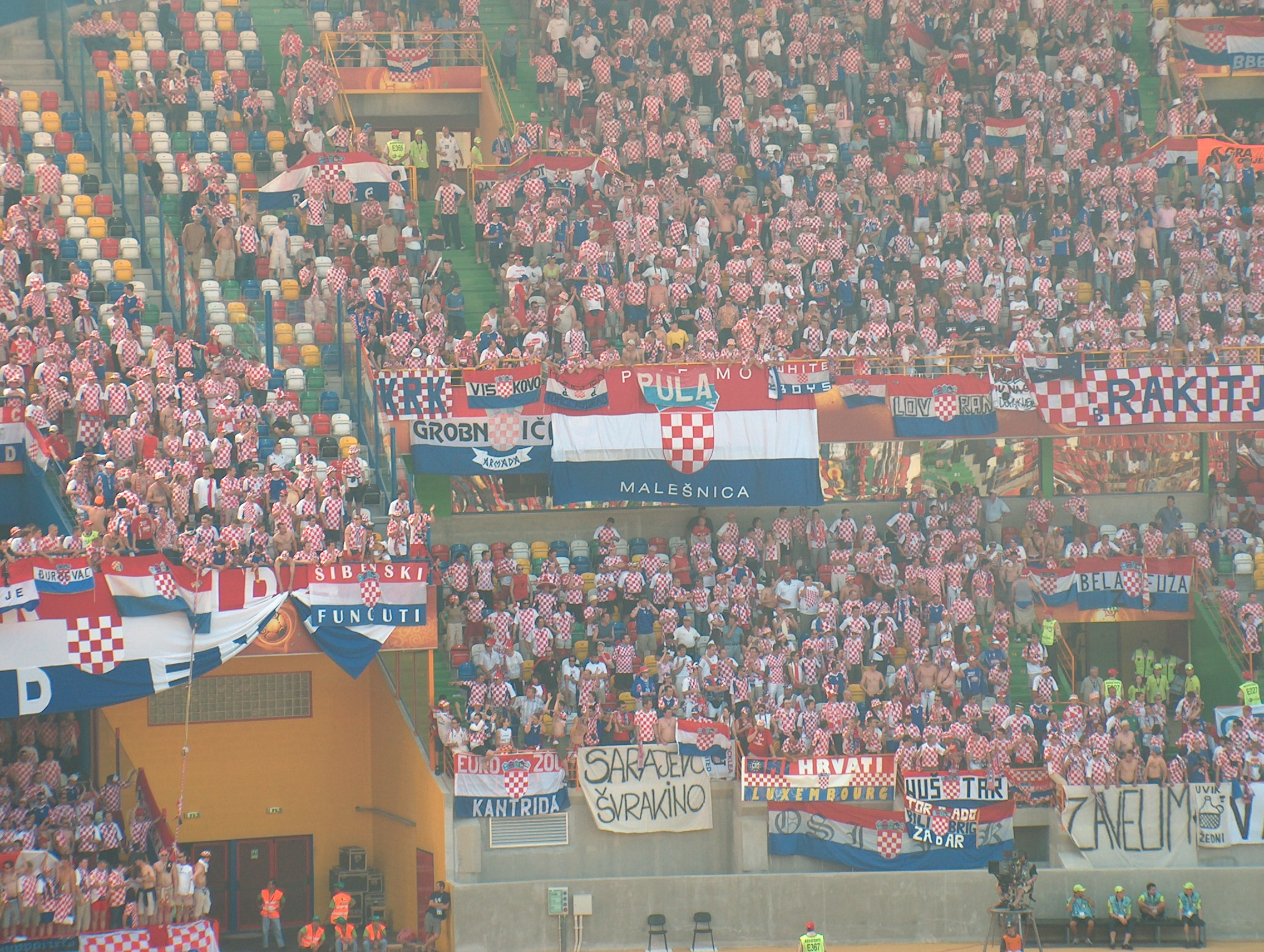
Fans during Euro 2004 in Portugal

Croatia started their qualifying campaign for the 2002 World Cup with draws against Belgium and Scotland prompting Blažević's resignation as head coach in October 2000. His successor, Mirko Jozić, pushed the team through the rest of qualifiers undefeated. In the group stage, Croatia narrowly lost to Mexico before beating Italy 2–1 and sustaining a 1–0 loss to Ecuador. The team was eliminated by one point, leading to the resignation of Jozić and succession of Otto Barić in July 2002, their first manager born outside of Southeast Europe. During Barić's tenure, most of the remaining players from the "golden generation" squad were gradually replaced by younger players over the course of qualifying for Euro 2004.

Croatia qualified in a playoff victory against Slovenia, winning 2–1 on aggregate after Dado Pršo's decisive late goal in the second leg. The team was eliminated at the group stage after drawing 0–0 with Switzerland and 2–2 with France, and losing 2–4 to England. Barić departed after his two-year contract expired in June 2004. Prior to launching the team's qualification for the 2006 World Cup, Zlatko Kranjčar succeed in July 2004. Croatia qualified undefeated, finishing top of the group ahead of Sweden and Bulgaria. In the group stage, Croatia lost their opening match against Brazil and drew 0–0 with Japan after Darijo Srna missed a first-half penalty. A 2–2 draw with Australia in which three players were sent off confirmed Croatia's elimination.

=== Bilić period (2006–2012) ===
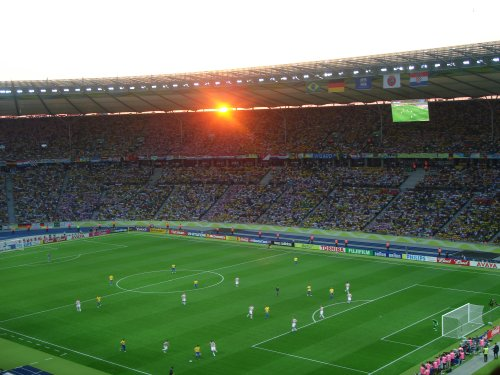
Bilić initially joined Croatia after the 2006 World Cup (pictured) until 2012, later returning 14 years later in 2026.

In July 2006, Kranjčar was replaced by Slaven Bilić, who introduced newer, younger players into the squad and concluded qualifying undefeated. His first match resulted in a 2–0 victory against reigning world champions Italy during an international friendly. Croatia lost once to Macedonia and defeated England twice, resulting in their failure to qualify for the first time since 1984. Eduardo da Silva, the team's top goalscorer during qualifying, suffered an injury while playing for his club, Arsenal, leading to a reshuffle in the finals squad with less experienced players. Croatia finished their play in Group B undefeated, with a 1–0 win over co-hosts Austria, a 2–1 victory against Germany, and a 1–0 win over Poland. The team achieved the maximum group stage points possible (nine) for the first time in their Euros history. Niko Kovač and Dario Šimić served as captains during the group and knockout stages, respectively. Croatia pushed Turkey to a penalty shoot-out in the quarter-finals, in which the Turkish side prevailed in an upset where Luka Modrić, Mladen Petrić, and Ivan Rakitić all missed their penalties. Croatia set multiple Euro records: fewest goals conceded (2), fewest games lost (0), (Note: Under the rules of Association football and the official European Championship tournament regulations, a loss inflicted via a penalty shootout does not count as a defeat but rather a tie which needed a final process to determine the team which advances per the Laws of the Game.) and earliest goal scored.

Bilić renewed his contract in April 2008, before the qualifying campaign for the 2010 World Cup. Croatia won 3–0 against Kazakhstan, before enduring a 4–1 loss to England at Stadion Maksimir, their first home loss in 14 years. The team drew 0–0 with Ukraine and beat Andorra twice, drawing again with Ukraine and beating Belarus twice. In the final stretch of the qualifiers, England delivered Croatia's then-heaviest loss, a 5–1 scoreline, at Wembley Stadium. The team had several injuries during qualifying and were ultimately eliminated on points, as Ukraine defeated both England and Andorra to advance in the group.

Croatia was a candidate to co-host Euro 2012 with Hungary which would have resulted in automatic qualification for both countries; UEFA ultimately selected Poland and Ukraine. The Croatians began their qualifying campaign for Euro 2012 with a 3–0 win over Latvia, a goalless draw with Greece, and a 2–1 win against Israel. In the qualifying playoff against Turkey, the team won 3–0 on aggregate. They were grouped with the Republic of Ireland, Italy and defending champions Spain, opening with a 3–1 victory over the Irish. Croatia drew with Italy 1–1 in a match marred by disruptive fans and controversial refereeing from English official Howard Webb. Spain knocked out the side in a 0–1 loss, which, along with 1–1 rematch with Italy, had Croatia eliminated. Bilić retired before Euro 2012, with the Croatians continuously ranked among the top ten teams in the world during his tenure – 2007 to 2012.

=== Štimac, Kovač and Čačić period (2012–2017) ===
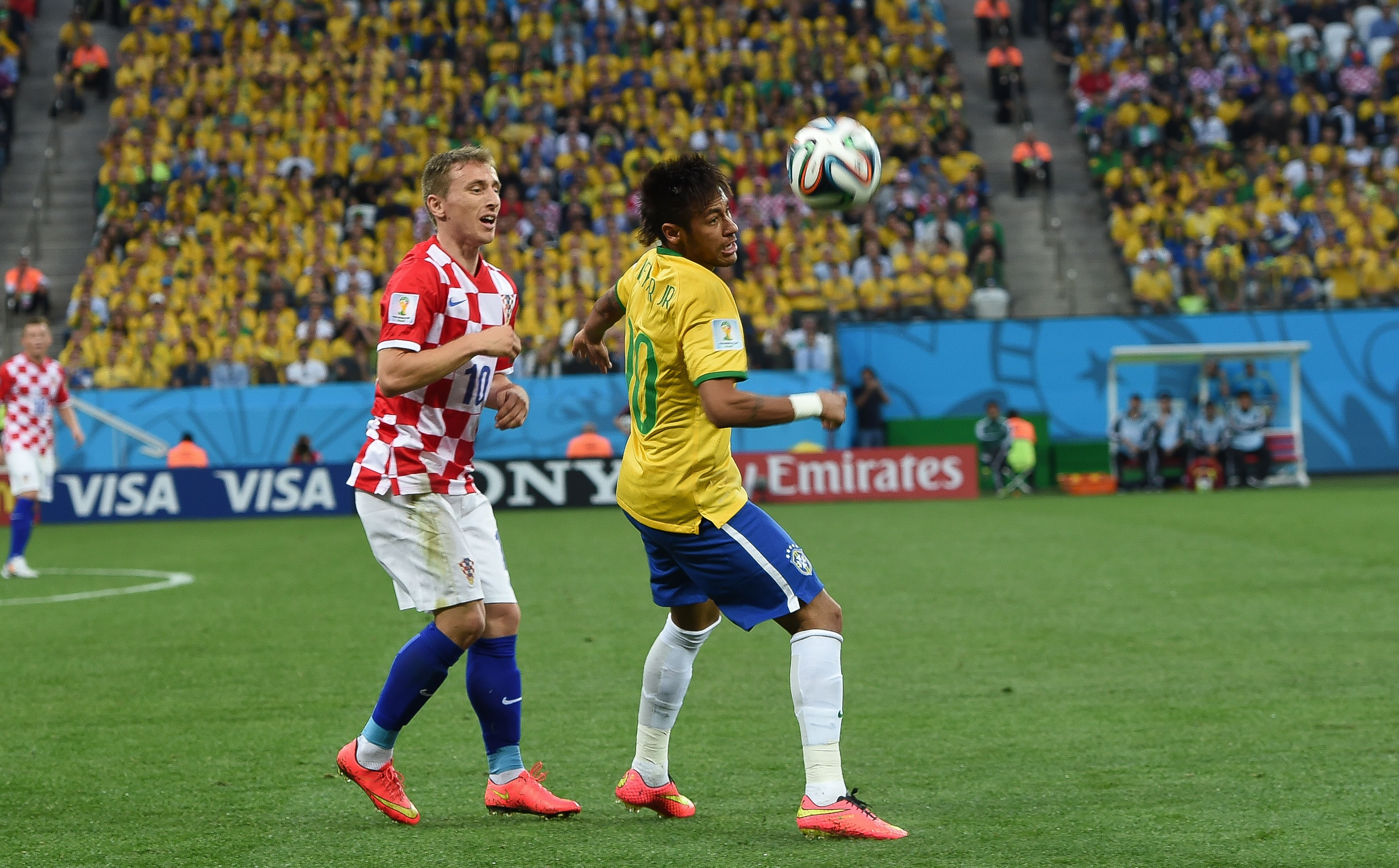
Croatia vs. Brazil at the 2014 World Cup

Succeeding Bilić, former player Igor Štimac was appointed manager. At the same time, Davor Šuker assumed the presidency of the Croatian Football Federation in 2012 after the death of Vlatko Marković. A year in, Štimac was replaced by former captain Niko Kovač. Kovač led the team to a 2–0 aggregate victory over Iceland in the qualifying playoffs for the 2014 World Cup with both goals coming in the home leg in Zagreb. In the group stage, Croatia opened their campaign with a 3–1 loss to hosts Brazil. The match garnered media attention for controversial refereeing from Yuichi Nishimura which was scrutinized for a number of decisions. In their second match, Croatia won 4–0 against Cameroon then lost 3–1 to Mexico, finishing third in the group and missing the knockout stage.

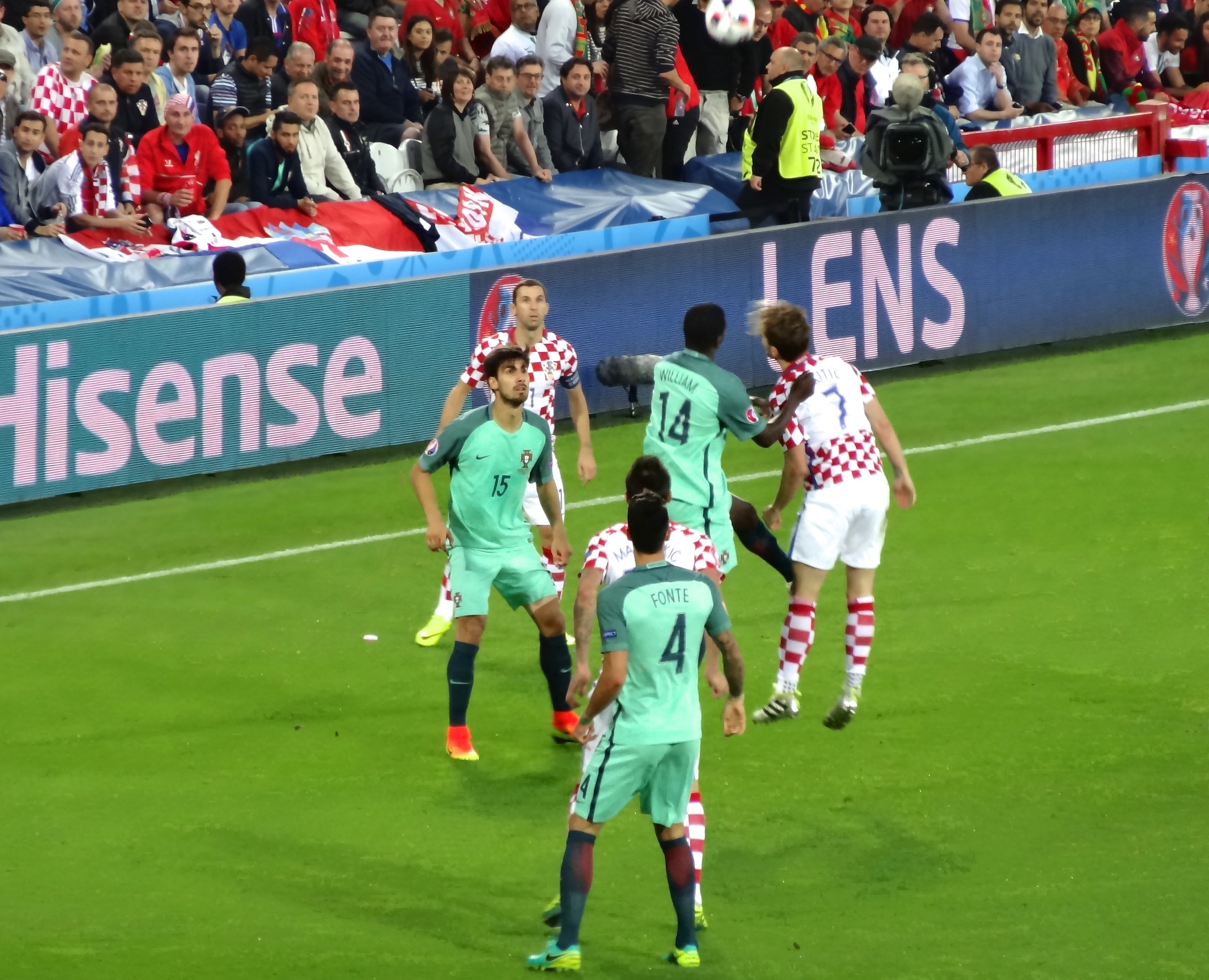
Croatia vs. Portugal at Euro 2016

During the qualifying campaign of Euro 2016, Croatia drew with Azerbaijan and lost to Norway, leading to Kovač's replacement with Ante Čačić. The team broke their record for most goals scored in a match with a friendly 10–0 win over San Marino in June 2016. They topped the group stage of that year's Euros, advancing with defending champions Spain. Croatia prevailed over Turkey 1–0 with a long-range volley goal from Luka Modrić, before drawing 2–2 against the Czech Republic. In the latter match, Croatia led with goals from Ivan Perišić and Ivan Rakitić, while opposing Czech striker Milan Škoda and a last-minute penalty from Tomáš Necid drew the match. There was severe crowd trouble and on-field flares in the game's last minutes with a steward injured by a stray firework. Croatia then defeated Spain 2–1, confirming the Spaniards' first defeat at a Euro finals match since 2004. The Croatians were tipped as one of the tournament favourites as they entered the knockout stage with Portugal. The Portuguese prevailed 1–0 with Ricardo Quaresma's winning goal in the 117th minute after Perišić hit the post with a header in the previous attack. Following the campaign, Darijo Srna announced his retirement and the succession of Modrić as team captain in August 2016.

=== Dalić period (2017–2026) ===

Squad at 2018 World Cup
Coach: Zlatko Dalić

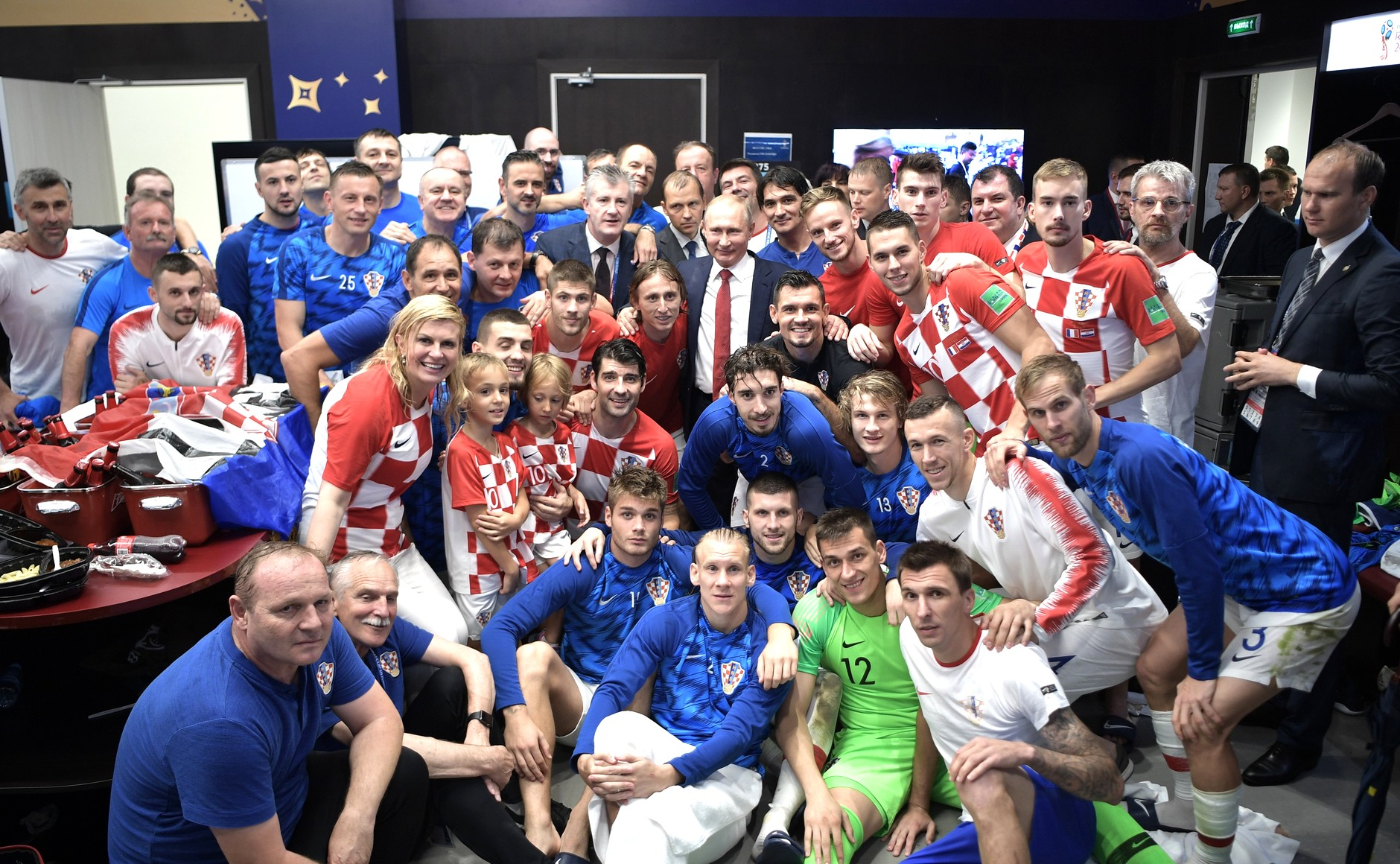
The 2017–18 squad posing with Vladimir Putin and Kolinda Grabar-Kitarović after the 2018 World Cup Final lost against France

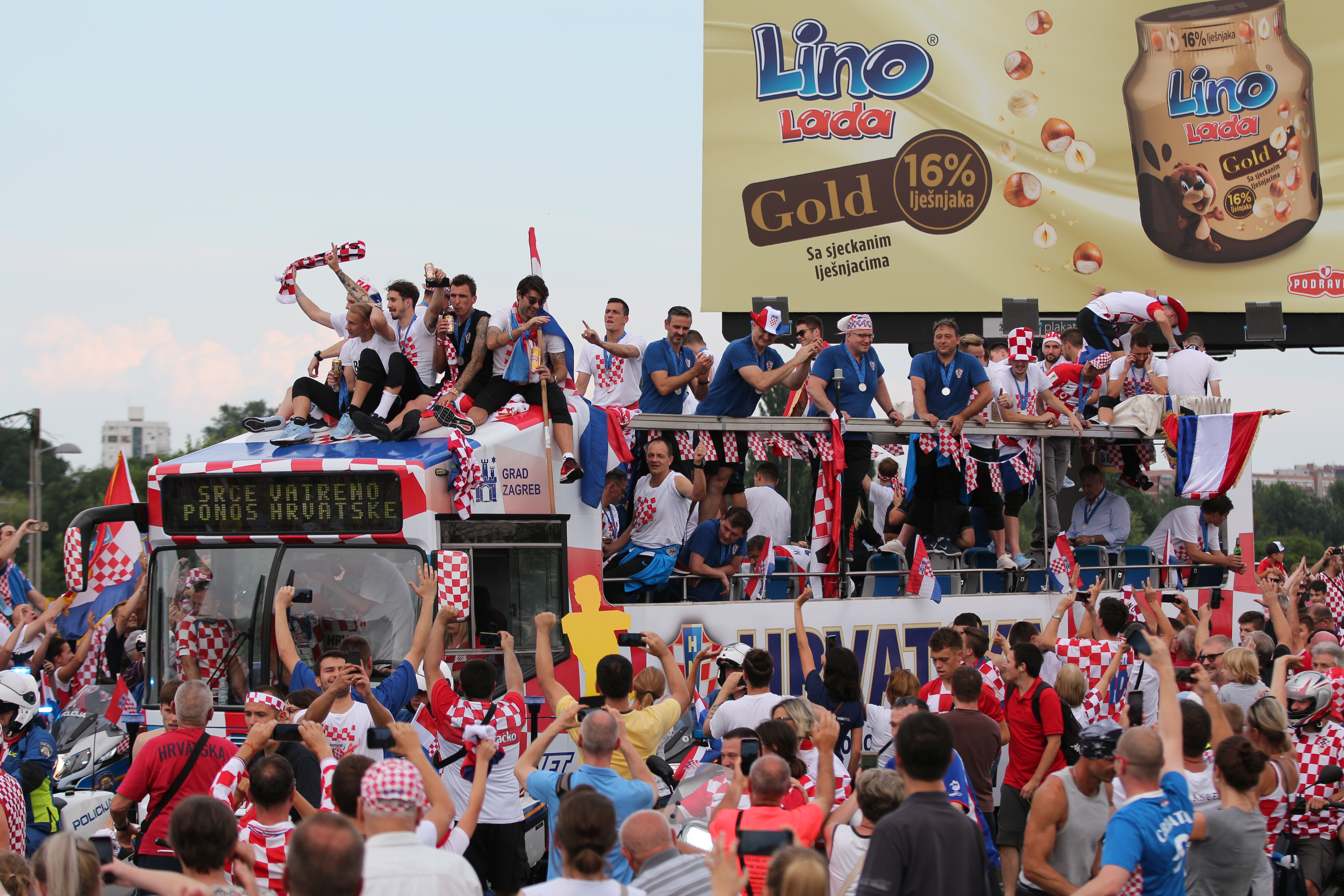
The team arrival in Zagreb after their 2018 World Cup campaign

Croatia qualified for the 2018 World Cup undefeated for their first five matches. Two defeats to Iceland and Turkey, as well as a draw against Finland, led to a public outcry that ousted manager Čačić. He was replaced by Zlatko Dalić, who formally qualified the team with a 2–0 win against Ukraine, and a 4–1 win with Greece, on aggregate, during a playoff round in the first leg in Zagreb. The 2017–18 squad was known as Croatia's second "golden generation", referencing their 1998 counterparts, during the side's World Cup campaign that year. They topped their group with a 2–0 victory over Nigeria, a 3–0 win over Argentina, and a 2–1 win against Iceland – their best-ever group stage performance.

During the knockout stage, they beat Denmark in a penalty shoot-out for the first time after goalkeeper Danijel Subašić saved three penalties, equalling the record for most penalties saved in a shoot-out. In the quarter-finals, Croatia drew 2–2 with hosts Russia, becoming the first team since 1990 to win two consecutive penalty shoot-outs. Playing England in the semi-finals, Croatia equalized to force their third consecutive extra time, matching the tournament record. Mario Mandžukić and Perišić scored as Croatia won 2–1 making them the second-smallest country by population (after Uruguay) and land area (after the Netherlands) to reach a World Cup final. In the final they lost to France 4–2, finishing in second place and securing the silver medal. The match was controversial (Note: A free kick was awarded to France for a possible dive by Antoine Griezmann as well as penalty later in the game awarded by the video assistant referee (VAR) for a handball by Ivan Perišić.) for its refereeing. The team was welcomed by an estimated half a million people (Note: The mass gathering amounted to over 10% of the nation's population. With 550,000 Croatians present, the event constituted the second-largest gathering in modern Croatia.) at their homecoming in Zagreb.

The team entered the Nations League's inaugural 2018–19 edition in League A, along with England and Spain in January 2018. Croatia lost 6–0 away to Spain in their first game. Croatia drew 0–0 home with England, played behind closed doors due to UEFA sanctions. In a rematch with the Spanish, Croatia won 3–2 with a goal in stoppage time, followed by a 2–1 away defeat to England. Croatia were set to be relegated to League B until a tournament rule change retained them in League A, grouping them with Portugal, France and Sweden in the 2020–21 tournament. Croatia lost to France and Portugal, but a victory against Sweden was sufficient to avoid relegation.

Squad at 2022 World Cup
Coach: Zlatko Dalić

The team topped their group for the qualifying campaign of Euro 2020, with a loss to Hungary, and draws against Azerbaijan and Wales. The 2020 finals were delayed to the summer of 2021 due to the COVID-19 pandemic. Overall, winning only two out of eight games in 2020, Croatia achieved their worst-ever aggregate win-rate. Croatia finished second in their Euros group, with a 1–0 loss to England, a 1–1 draw with the Czech Republic and a 3–1 win over Scotland. They advanced to the round of 16, where they lost to Spain 5–3 after extra time. The loss to Spain led to heightened criticism against Dalić and the team by the Croatian public, a faction of whom called for resignations. Dalić refreshed the team roster by introducing younger debutants for the remainder of World Cup qualifying in 2021.

Croatia qualified for the 2022 World Cup with seven wins, two draws and one loss. The team advanced from group stage after a 0–0 draw with Morocco, a 4–1 win against Canada, and finished ahead of Belgium by a single point after drawing 0–0. They won against Japan in a penalty shootout in the round of 16 where Dominik Livaković saved three of four Japanese penalties, equalling a record held by Ricardo and Danijel Subašić. Croatia similarly beat Brazil during the quarter-finals in an upset victory on penalties, having come from behind to draw 1–1 in the final minutes of extra time. In the semi-final match, Croatia sustained their heaviest World Cup defeat, 3–0 against Argentina. They prevailed 2–1 over Morocco in the third place playoff, securing their second bronze medal.

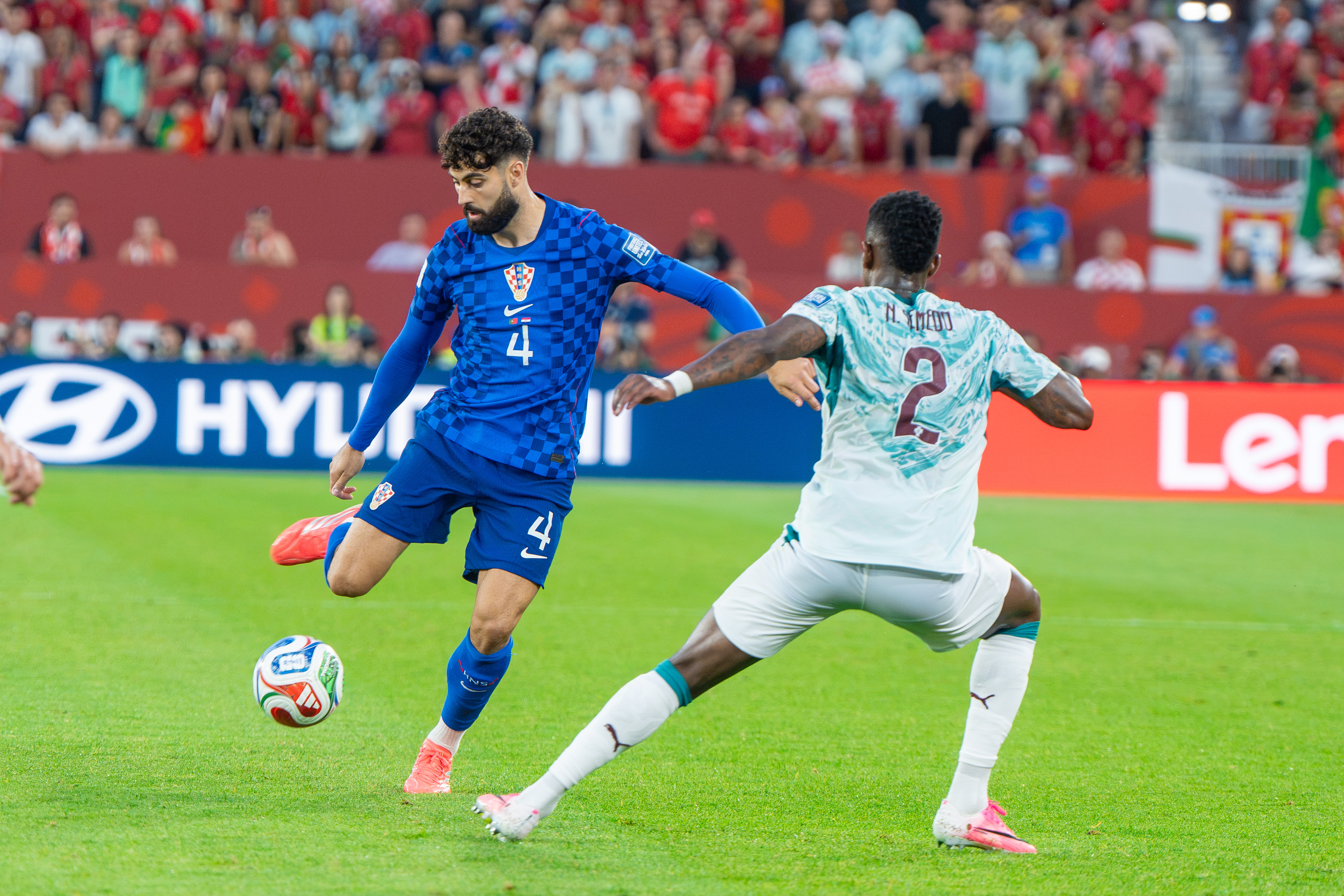
Gvardiol versus Portugal, July 2026

The team topped their group in the 2023 Nations League, knocking out reigning champions France by winning 1–0 on a penalty – their first-ever win against the French. Croatia beat the Netherlands 4–2 in the semi-finals, advancing to their first Nations League final, against Spain. After drawing the Spanish 0–0 in extra time, the team lost the penalty shootout 4–5, finishing the tournament in second place. Croatia finished second in qualifying for Euro 2024, being drawn into a "group of death" with Spain, Italy, and Albania. After a 3–0 loss to Spain, they drew 2–2 with Albania and 1–1 with Italy. The Italians eliminated Croatia from advancing to the knockout stage, on points, with a 98th minute stoppage-time goal from striker Mattia Zaccagni. They went on to win the 2024 FIFA Series tournament in March, Croatia's first international friendly championship.

Croatia topped their qualifying group undefeated for the 2026 World Cup – with 7 wins and 1 draw – in their best qualification run to date. After finishing second in group stage, they advanced to the knockout stage. They were knocked out by Portugal in a 2–1 defeat where an equalizing 103rd-minute stoppage-time goal from Joško Gvardiol was controversially disallowed as offside by snickometer-enabled VAR. After Dalić’s resignation at the conclusion of his contract, he was succeeded by Bilić in his second term as manager.

=== Bilić return (2026–) ===
The return of Slaven Bilić coincided with the 2026–27 UEFA Nations League where Croatia won their debut game against Czechia, 2–1. Croatia sustained their largest-ever defeat on record, in a 7–0 match against England that Bilić labeled a "collective blackout" for the side.

== See also ==
- Football in Croatia
- Croatia at the FIFA World Cup
- Croatia in the UEFA Nations League
- Croatia at the UEFA European Championship
