= 1990 Croatia–United States football match =

Croatia–United States
- Promotional poster created by Miroslav Šutej
- Event: International friendly
Croatia	United States
(Croatia)	(United States)
2	1
- Date: 17 October 1990
- Venue: Maksimir Stadium, Zagreb
- Referee: Sergio Coppetelli (Italy)
- Attendance: 30,000

On 17 October 1990, Croatia hosted the United States in capital city of Zagreb to play their first international football match. The match was an unofficial exhibition game ("friendly") played in Maksimir Stadium, the largest football stadium in Croatia. The match is considered historically significant for the national team as it was held on the eve of the nation's independence from Yugoslavia. This was Croatia's second match as a team since 1956. The Croatian Football Federation was readmitted into FIFA on 3 July 1992 and UEFA on 16 June 1993, so this match was considered "unaffiliated" in the transition period.

== Background ==
With the abolishing of the one-party political system in SFR Yugoslavia in 1990, SR Croatia's (constituent republic within the Yugoslav federation) first parliamentary elections were held over two rounds of voting on 22 April and 7 May 1990 resulting in an overwhelming victory for the nationalist Croatian Democratic Union (HDZ) led by Franjo Tuđman. With the rising nationalism and ethnic tensions, several incidents took place at football matches in SR Croatia over the coming months.

Only six days later, on Sunday, 13 May 1990, a riot broke out at Maksimir Stadium during a Yugoslav First League match between the Croatian club Dinamo Zagreb and the Serbian club Red Star Belgrade. Dinamo midfielder 21-year-old Zvonimir Boban attacked a policeman and got a 6-month suspension by the Yugoslav FA (FSJ), causing him to miss the 1990 FIFA World Cup as well as the pre-tournament friendlies.

At one of those friendlies on 3 June 1990 versus the Netherlands at Maksimir Stadium in Zagreb (Yugoslavia's last preparation match before the World Cup) local Croatian fans booed the Yugoslav anthem and players, while cheering for the opposing Netherlands side which won the match 0-2.

On 26 September 1990, several weeks into the following Yugoslav League season, another incident broke out, this time in Split. Hajduk Split's home match against Partizan Belgrade at Poljud Stadium was cancelled after local fans stormed the pitch, chased Partizan players off, tore down the Yugoslav flag from the official mast and burned it.

== Game ==
The United States was on a tour of Europe where the team was already scheduled to play Poland. Croatian businessman Jure Klarić financed the US$90,000 needed for the Americans to subsequently travel to Zagreb.

The exhibition took place on 17 October 1990. The match took place at the same time as the final of the 1990 UEFA European Under-21 Football Championship, in which several young Croatian talents played for Yugoslavia (Zvonimir Boban, Davor Šuker, Robert Jarni, Igor Štimac, Robert Prosinečki and Alen Bokšić). The exhibition was permitted by the Croat secretary of the Football Association of Yugoslavia, Ante Pavlović, who suspended the decision of the association's own committees regarding the match.

Despite conflicting with the Yugoslav juniors' match in the European finals, the match drew 30,000 spectators. Croatia won the match 2–1. The match was officiated by a group of Italian officials consisting of Sergio Coppetelli, Dario Boemo, and Giancarlo Dal Forno, with the Croat Atif Lipovac being the fourth official.

The match marked the debut of the Croatian national team's checkered jersey, designed by Miroslav Šutej who also designed the modern Flag of Croatia and the banknotes for the Croatian kuna.

== Match details ==
17 October 1990

Croatia	2–1	United States
Asanović 29'; Cvjetković 33'	(Report)	Dayak 80'

Maksimir Stadium, Zagreb
Attendance: 30,000
Referee: Sergio Coppetelli (Italy)

Croatia	United States

GK	Dražen Ladić
DF	Zoran Vulić
DF	Drago Čelić
DF	Darko Dražić
DF	Vlado Kasalo
MF	Saša Peršon
MF	Kujtim Shala
MF	Zlatko Kranjčar
MF	Ivan Cvjetković
FW	Aljoša Asanović
FW	Marko Mlinarić
Substitutes:
GK	Tonči Gabrić
MF	Gregor Židan
MF	Mladen Mladenović
Manager:
(Croatia) Dražan Jerković

GK	Tony Meola
DF	Steve Trittschuh
DF	Marcelo Balboa
DF	Desmond Armstrong
DF	Robin Fraser
MF	Jimmy Banks
MF	John Harkes
MF	Eric Eichmann
MF	Paul Krumpe
FW	Bruce Murray
FW	Peter Vermes
Substitutes:
DF	Mike Windischmann
DF	Brian Bliss
DF	Troy Dayak
Manager:
(United States) Bob Gansler

== See also ==
- 1956 Croatia–Indonesia football match
