= Slaven Bilić =

Croatian football manager and former player

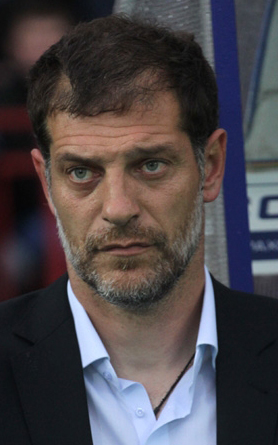
- Bilić in 2012

Personal information
- Full name: Slaven Bilić
- Date of birth: 11 September 1968 (age 58)
- Place of birth: Split, SR Croatia, Yugoslavia
- Height: 1.88 m (6 ft 2 in)
- Position: Defender

Team information
- Current team: Croatia (head coach)

Youth career
- 1977–1988: Hajduk Split

Senior career*
Years	Team	Apps	(Gls)
1988–1993	Hajduk Split	109	(13)
1988	→ Primorac (loan)	13	(1)
1988–1989	→ Šibenik (loan)	33	(7)
1993–1996	Karlsruher SC	66	(5)
1996–1997	West Ham United	48	(2)
1997–1999	Everton	26	(0)
1999–2000	Hajduk Split	9	(0)
Total		294	(28)

International career
1992–1999	Croatia	44	(3)

Managerial career
- 2001–2002: Hajduk Split
- 2004–2006: Croatia U21
- 2006–2012: Croatia
- 2012–2013: Lokomotiv Moscow
- 2013–2015: Beşiktaş
- 2015–2017: West Ham United
- 2018–2019: Al-Ittihad
- 2019–2020: West Bromwich Albion
- 2021–2022: Beijing Guoan
- 2022–2023: Watford
- 2023–2024: Al-Fateh
- 2026–: Croatia
Medal record
Men's football
Representing Croatia
FIFA World Cup
Third place	1998 France
- * Club domestic league appearances and goals

Slaven Bilić (pronounced [slǎʋen bǐːlitɕ]; born 11 September 1968) is a Croatian professional football manager and former player. He is currently the head coach of the Croatia national team. His career as a footballer was primarily with Hajduk Split during the 1980s and 1990s where he played as a defender. He played in the Premier League with both West Ham United and Everton during the late 1990s. He represented the Croatia national football team from 1992 to 1999, helping Croatia secure its first World Cup medal, finishing third with bronze in the 1998 FIFA World Cup.

Following his retirement from football in 2001, Bilić embarked on his management career by returning to Hajduk Split until 2002. He was called up to coach Croatia's under-21 team for two years before taking over the senior team from 2006 to 2012. He led the team to the quarter-finals of the 2008 UEFA European Championship and left after the next edition four years later. His tenure was noted for the successful integration of emerging second "Golden Generation" players into the senior team. He went on to manage eight clubs across Europe, Asia, and the Middle East – notably West Ham United – during the 2010s and 2020s.

== Club career ==
=== Early life and Hajduk Split ===
Almost all Hajduk juniors attended local high schools. As there were no classical grammar schools in Split, Bilić enrolled in an information, journalism and documentary (INDOK) studies program. All throughout high school, Bilić was a top student in his class and graduated by completing Matura. His favorite subjects were mathematics and history. The year he enrolled in a university program, he already had excellent prospects to build a career as a football player. However, he still decided to attend university and later graduated from the law faculty in Split where his father acted as dean.

As a Hajduk player, he was on loan for half a year at NK Primorac, and for 18 months at HNK Šibenik, which, that season, finished fifth in the Yugoslav Second League, barely missing promotion to the top flight Bilić, as centre half, scored seven goals in the championship. He also played for the Yugoslavia national team, having been called up by Petar Nadoveza for three matches in which he then scored two goals and was declared man of the match in all three.

Bilić was then targeted by other clubs in the league, including Dinamo Zagreb, Red Star Belgrade and Partizan. However, he decided to stay with Hajduk which finished third in the 1989–90 season and won the 1990–91 cup competition. During the first season of the newly founded Croatian First League, Hajduk won both the league and the Super Cup. The following season, the club also secured its first Croatian Cup title.

=== West Ham United ===
In January 1996, Harry Redknapp, manager of Premier League club West Ham United, brought Bilić to the club for a fee of £1.3 million, setting the new club record for highest fee paid for an incoming player. Bilić made his debut on 12 February 1996 in a 0–1 away win against London rivals Tottenham Hotspur. The goal for West Ham came after Bilić's shot had been saved by Tottenham goalkeeper Ian Walker and the ball then diverted into Tottenham goal by another West Ham debutant, Dani.

He played 13 games in the 1995–96 season and 41 in the 1996–97 season in which he scored three goals (two in the Premier League, against Liverpool and Sunderland, and one in the League Cup, against Barnet) and was voted runner-up, to Julian Dicks, for the Hammer of the Year award.

In March 1997, Joe Royle brokered Bilić's £4.5 million move to Everton, with Bilić requesting to stay with West Ham until the end of the season and help club's efforts to avoid relegation. West Ham finished the season in 14th place, two points outside the relegation zone.

=== Everton ===
Bilić first played for Everton in August 1997, with full support from the new manager Howard Kendall. Bilić initially brought some class to Everton's backline, but his season was marred by bookings that saw him miss several games due to suspensions.

After the 1998 World Cup, Bilić developed issues with a persistent groin strain, and returned to Croatia for treatment. After missing the first quarter of the season, he was left wondering if he would get back into Everton's first eleven, now managed by Walter Smith. He did so and showed some good form, but never fully re-established himself due to injuries and suspensions. Subsequently, Everton released Bilić in July 1999.

=== Hajduk Split ===
Two days after being released by Everton, Bilić signed for his home club Hajduk Split, where he played briefly before retiring. He led Hajduk as team captain to their first trophy in five years, winning the Croatian Cup.

== International career ==
On 5 July 1992, Bilić made his international debut for the Croatia national football team in a friendly match against Australia at the Olympic Park Stadium, where Croatia lost 0–1. At the UEFA Euro 1996, he played in all four matches as Croatia secured a spot in the top eight, losing to Germany 1–2 in the quarterfinals.

At the 1998 World Cup, Croatia became the biggest surprise of the tournament. The team only lost two matches, against Argentina in the group stage (0–1) and France in the semifinals (1–2). After winning the play-off match against the Netherlands, Croatia finished the tournament in third place. Bilić played in all seven matches and was involved in a controversy for the role he played in the dismissal of Laurent Blanc in the semi-final against France. With Croatia behind, a free-kick was awarded, which saw Bilić marking and holding the French defender. Blanc pushed Bilić, making contact with his chin and chest. Bilić fell to the ground clutching his forehead. Bilić later admitted to overacting and going down only after being encouraged to do so by teammate Igor Štimac. Blanc was sent off and missed the World Cup final due to suspension. Bilić never officially apologized, but stated: "If I could change that moment, so that Blanc could have played in the final, I would."

== Managerial career ==
=== Early days ===
In 2001, as a shareholder of his hometown club, Hajduk Split, Bilić agreed to temporarily manage the team until the club could find a replacement manager. He stated that the adrenaline rush he experienced during this period inspired him, and reportedly sought and received guidance from Arsène Wenger and Marcello Lippi.

=== Croatia ===
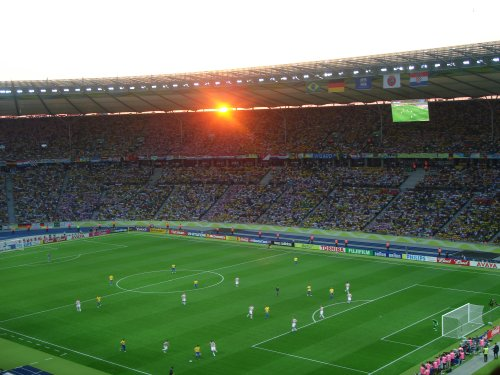
Bilić initially joined Croatia after the 2006 World Cup (pictured) until 2012, later returning 14 years later in 2026.

Bilić was initially appointed head coach of the Croatia national team on 25 July 2006, succeeding Zlatko Kranjčar. His assistants included former teammates Aljoša Asanović, Robert Prosinečki, Nikola Jurčević, and Marjan Mrmić. One of his first actions was the promotion of three players from the under-21 squad: Eduardo, Luka Modrić, and Vedran Ćorluka, all of whom eventually built impressive careers. The team's first official game under Bilić was the 2–0 win in an away friendly match against Italy, while Bilić's first competitive game was the goalless draw in Moscow against Russia in the opener of the Euro 2008 qualifying campaign. Many criticized this result due to Bilić's suspension of Darijo Srna, Ivica Olić and Boško Balaban, who left the team camp three days before the match for a controversial evening at a night club in Zagreb.

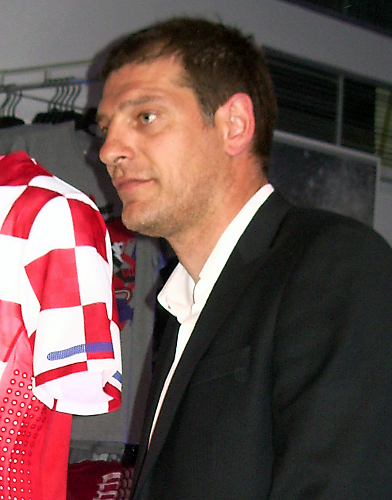
Bilić with Croatia, 2010

In the continuation of the Euro 2008 qualifiers, Bilić led Croatia with success. In a group consisting of England, Russia, Israel, Macedonia, Estonia, and Andorra, Croatia secured the top spot in Group E, with notable wins against England both home and away. Bilić's win against the English was widely publicized, with their manager Steve McClaren dismissed shortly thereafter.

At the Euro 2008 tournament itself, where he was the youngest coach, Bilić's squad had to deal with the absence of star striker Eduardo who had sustained a serious injury a few months earlier. Nonetheless, Croatia won all three group stage games of the competition, including the match against the eventual finalists Germany. The media subsequently labelled Croatia favourites to win the tournament, but the team suffered an abrupt exit in the quarterfinals against Turkey.

At UEFA Euro 2012, Croatia won against the Republic of Ireland, drew against Italy, and lost 0–1 to Spain, exiting the tournament at the group stage. The team garnered widespread praise for their performance, and were greeted by a large crowd upon their return to Zagreb. Upon his formal departure as national coach, Bilić was praised for his long-standing service. Domestic media outlet Jutarnji list labelled him as Croatia's first manager to leave the team on a positive note and credited him for the team's revival during his six-year tenure.

=== Lokomotiv Moscow ===
On 14 May 2012, it was confirmed that Bilić had signed a coaching contract with the Russian club Lokomotiv Moscow. Club chairman, Olga Smorodskaya, stated that Lokomotiv had tough competition in their attempt to signing Bilić, as he was targeted by many other clubs from across Europe. Bilić again joined forces with former teammates and former assistants, Aljoša Asanović and Nikola Jurčević, who again acted as his assistants. Bilić also immediately secured a major signing by bringing Ćorluka from Tottenham Hotspur for a fee of £5.5 million. Bilić's first official match as the new Lokomotiv manager was a 3–2 away win against Mordoviya Saransk on 20 July 2012. His first season at the club ended with Lokomotiv's worst league result (ninth place) since the establishment of Russian championship in 1992. Bilić accepted responsibility for team's failure and was dismissed on 18 June 2013.

=== Beşiktaş ===
After leaving Lokomotiv, Bilić entered talks to take over as Beşiktaş manager. The deal was confirmed on 26 June 2013, and two days later, Bilć signed a three-year contract worth €4.8 million. On 22 September, during the Istanbul derby against Galatasaray, Bilić was sent-off from the bench by referee Fırat Aydınus, after he had complained about the amount of time added by the referee. Beşiktaş president Fikret Orman announced on 21 May 2015 that Bilić would leave the club at the end of the 2014–15 season.

=== West Ham United ===
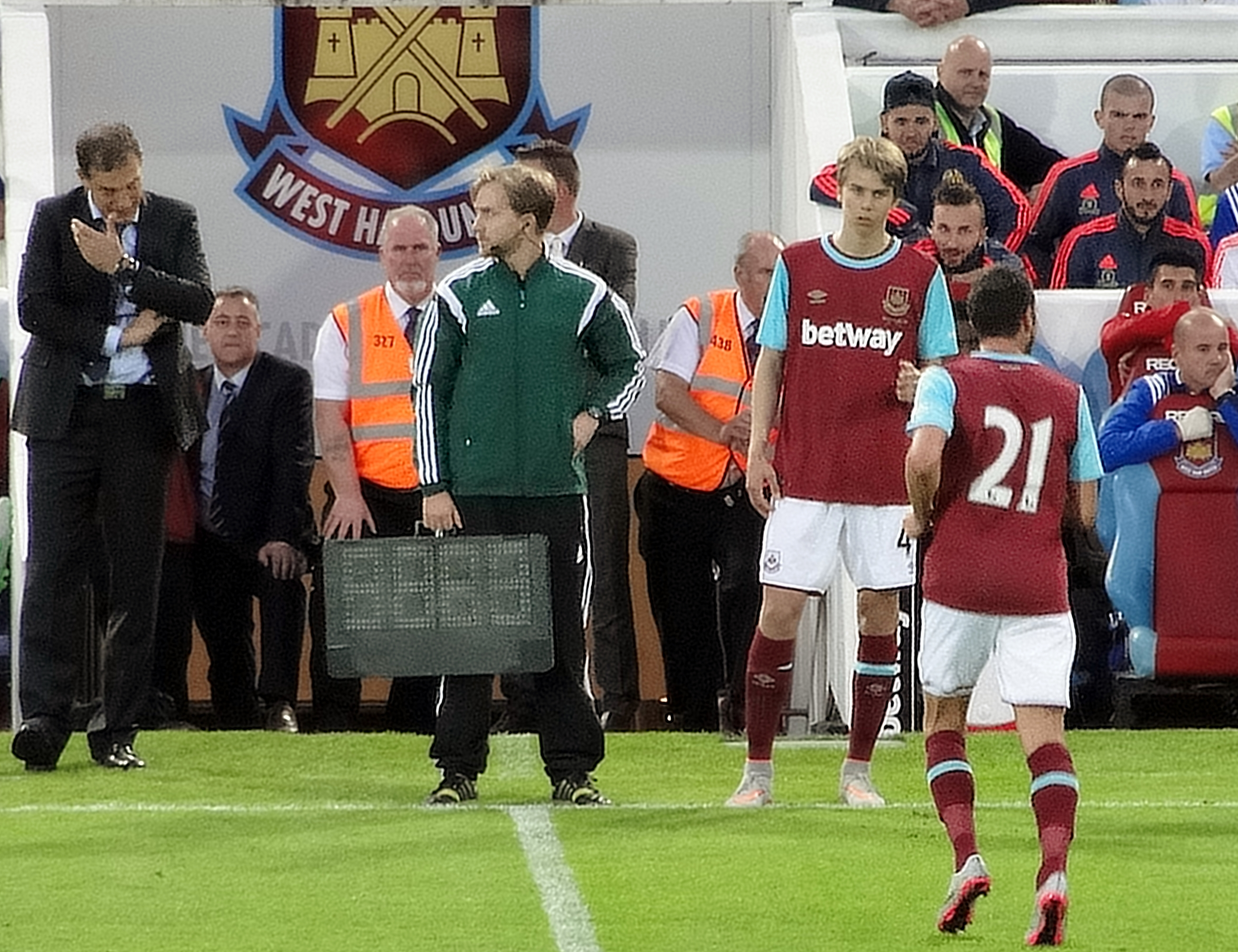
Bilić managing West Ham United in 2015

On 9 June 2015, Bilić was appointed manager at his former club West Ham United in the English Premier League. He signed a three-year contract. In his first Premier League game on 9 August, his team defeated Arsenal 2–0 at the Emirates Stadium. Three weeks later, he became the first manager since 1963 to lead West Ham to victory against Liverpool at Anfield. On 19 September, Bilić led West Ham to a third successive 2–1 away win against Manchester City. It was the first time the Hammers had won three successive Premier League away games since September 2007, and only three other sides had recorded away wins at Arsenal, Liverpool, and Manchester City in the same Premier League season. In Bilić's first season as manager, West Ham finished seventh in the Premier League. Towards the end of the season, they defeated Manchester United 3–2, thereby significantly lowering United's chances of securing a spot in the Champions League. Bilić's West Ham team broke several club records in the Premier League era, including the highest number of points (62), the highest number of goals scored in a season (65), a positive goal difference for the first time in the Premier League (+14), the lowest number of losses in a season (8), and the lowest number of away losses in a season (5).

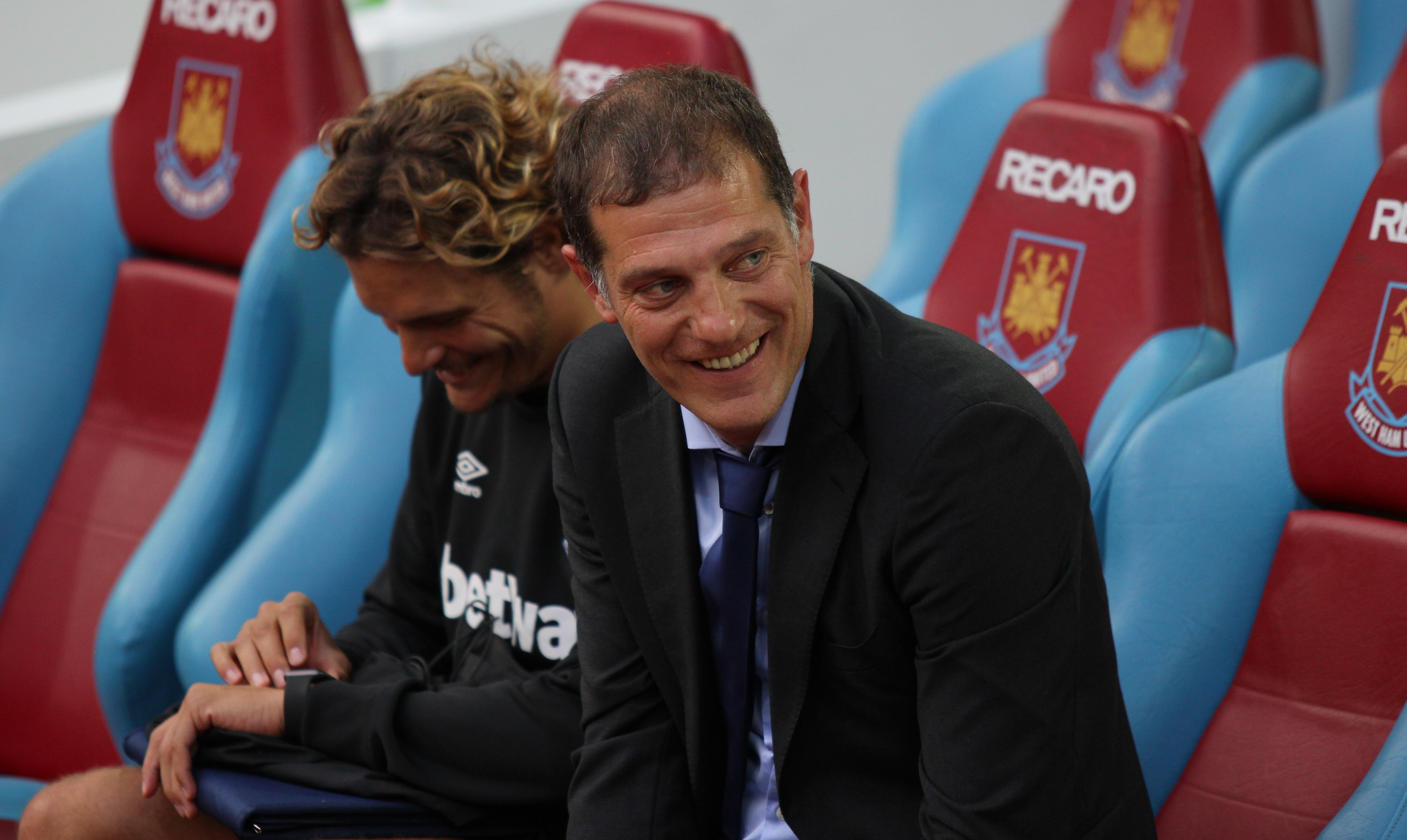
Bilić against Birkrikara, 2015

Following Manchester United's win in the 2016 FA Cup Final, West Ham took their UEFA Europa League place and qualified for the third qualifying round of the 2016–17 UEFA Europa League. For the second consecutive season, they were eliminated in the qualifying stage of the competition. Bilić's second season with West Ham was less successful, as the club finished 11th in the Premier League with a total of 17 losses. This was the first season the club played home matches at the newly constructed London Stadium. The season was marred by the acrimonious departure of star player, Dimitri Payet, who refused to continue playing for West Ham mid-season, on 12 January 2017.

In his third season, after a poor run of results in the Premier League, culminating in a 1–4 home loss to Liverpool on 4 November 2017, Bilić was dismissed. The announcement, made two days after that match, stated that "West Ham United can confirm that Slaven Bilic has left his position with the club. West Ham United believe a change is necessary in order for the club to move forward positively and in line with our ambitions." He left the team with a record of 1.33 points per Premier League game, which was the best among all previous West Ham managers.

=== Al-Ittihad ===
On 27 September 2018, Bilić joined Al-Ittihad of the Saudi Professional League. On 24 February 2019, after five months as manager of Al-Ittihad, and after winning only 6 of his 20 matches in charge, Bilić was dismissed from the position.

=== West Bromwich Albion ===
On 13 June 2019, Bilić was named as head coach of West Bromwich Albion on a two-year contract. On 22 July 2020, he led the club to promotion back to the Premier League, finishing as runner-up in the 2019–20 EFL Championship.

On 22 September, Bilić was charged with improper conduct by the FA, after remonstrating with referee Mike Dean a few days earlier, during his team's 2–5 defeat to Everton.

On 16 December 2020, despite a surprise 1–1 draw against Manchester City, Bilić and his coaching staff were dismissed by West Brom due to a poor start to the season. At the time, West Brom were 19th in the league, having taken just seven points from 13 games.

=== Beijing Guoan ===
On 6 January 2021, Bilić was named as head coach of Chinese Super League side Beijing Guoan on a two-year contract. On 8 January 2022, Bilić parted ways with Beijing Guoan.

=== Watford ===
On 26 September 2022, Bilić became manager of Watford on an 18-month contract, after the dismissal of Rob Edwards. In Bilić's first game in charge, on 2 October, Watford won 4–0 away against Stoke City.

On 7 March 2023, Bilić was dismissed, with the club sitting in ninth position and four points away from the play-offs. The club statement focused on the fact that Watford had won just once in the most recent eight Championship games. He was replaced by Chris Wilder until the end of the season.

=== Al-Fateh ===
On 8 July 2023, Bilić was appointed as manager of Saudi Pro League side Al-Fateh. On 16 August 2024, Bilić and Al-Fateh ended the contract by mutual agreement.

=== Croatia return ===
After 14 years, Bilić returned as head coach of the Croatia national team on 13 July 2026 at the behest of the Croatian Football Federation following the departure of Zlatko Dalić. His return coincided with the 2026–27 UEFA Nations League where Croatia won their debut game against Czechia, 2–1. Croatia sustained their largest-ever defeat on record, in a 7–0 match against England that Bilić labeled a "collective blackout" for the side.

== Management style ==
Bilić is a long-time proponent of extensive opposition research as part of game preparation. He has used music as a motivational tool for teams in both pre- and post-match contexts. Bilić has credited Croatia's 3–2 qualifying win over England in the UEFA Euro 2008 qualifiers with raising his international profile as a manager. At the club level, his management style with West Brom was described as "inclusive management with a death stare." He is known for his on-field composure and calm demeanor.

== Personal life ==
Along with his native Croatian, Bilić is fluent in German, Italian and English. He holds a degree in law. He plays rhythm guitar and is a member of Croatian rock band Rawbau. In 2008, the band recorded a song for Croatia's performance at Euro 2008 called Vatreno ludilo (Fiery Madness).

Since early childhood, Bilić has been suffering from a slight stammer, which he has learned to control as he grew older.

== Career statistics ==
=== Club ===
Club	Season	League			National cup (Note: Includes Yugoslav Cup, Croatian Cup, DFB-Pokal, FA Cup)		League cup (Note: Includes Football League Cup)		Continental		Total	
Club	Season	Division	Apps	Goals	Apps	Goals	Apps	Goals	Apps	Goals	Apps	Goals
Primorac (loan)	1988–89	Croatian Republican League	13	1	0	0	–		–		13	1
Šibenik (loan)	1988–89	Yugoslav Second League	33	7	2	0	–		–		35	7
Hajduk Split	1988–89	Yugoslav First League	3	2	0	0	–		–		3	2
Hajduk Split	1989–90	Yugoslav First League	27	3	6	1	–		–		33	4
Hajduk Split	1990–91	Yugoslav First League	32	2	7	0	–		1	0	40	2
Hajduk Split	1991–92	Prva HNL	20	1	2	0	–		1	0	23	1
Hajduk Split	1992–93	Prva HNL	27	5	7	3	1	0	–		35	8
Hajduk Split	Total		109	13	22	4	1	0	2	0	134	17
Karlsruher SC	1993–94	Bundesliga	26	2	8	3	–		9	1	38	4
Karlsruher SC	1994–95	Bundesliga	28	3	4	0	–		–		32	3
Karlsruher SC	1995–96	Bundesliga	12	0	2	1	–		6	2	20	1
Karlsruher SC	Total		66	5	14	4	0	0	15	3	95	12
West Ham United	1995–96	Premier League	13	0	0	0	–		–		13	0
West Ham United	1996–97	Premier League	35	2	1	0	5	1	–		41	3
West Ham United	Total		48	2	1	0	5	1	0	0	54	3
Everton	1997–98	Premier League	22	2	0	0	3	0	–		25	2
Everton	1998–99	Premier League	4	0	1	0	0	0	–		5	0
Everton	Total		26	2	1	0	3	0	0	0	30	2
Hajduk Split	1999–2000	Prva HNL	9	0	4	0	–		0	0	13	0
Hajduk Split	2000–01	Prva HNL	–		–		–		2	0	2	0
Hajduk Split	Total		9	0	4	0	0	0	2	0	15	0
Total			304	30	44	8	9	1	18	3	375	42

=== International ===
Croatia
Year	Apps	Goals
1992	4	0
1993	0	0
1994	6	0
1995	6	0
1996	11	1
1997	7	2
1998	9	0
1999	1	0
Total	44	3

Results list Croatia's goal tally first.

No.	Date	Venue	Cap	Opponent	Score	Result	Competition
1	8 October 1996	Stadio Renato Dall'Ara, Bologna, Italy	26	Bosnia and Herzegovina	1–0	4–1	1998 FIFA World Cup qualification
2	6 September 1997	Stadion Maksimir, Zagreb, Croatia	31	Bosnia and Herzegovina	1–1	3–2	1998 FIFA World Cup qualification
3	29 October 1997	Stadion Maksimir, Zagreb, Croatia	34	Ukraine	1–0	2–0	1998 FIFA World Cup qualification

== Managerial statistics ==
As of 15 November 2026

Managerial record by team and tenure
Team	From	To	Record					Ref.
Team	From	To	G	W	D	L	Win %	Ref.
Hajduk Split	5 December 2001	4 May 2002	17	11	4	2	64.71	
Croatia U21	1 July 2004	30 June 2006	19	8	4	7	42.11	
Croatia	25 July 2006	14 May 2012	65	42	15	8	64.62	
Lokomotiv Moscow	14 May 2012	18 June 2013	32	13	7	12	40.63	
Beşiktaş	28 June 2013	21 May 2015	92	48	22	22	52.17	
West Ham United	9 June 2015	4 November 2017	111	42	30	39	37.84	
Al-Ittihad	5 October 2018	24 February 2019	20	6	5	9	30.00	
West Bromwich Albion	13 June 2019	16 December 2020	65	26	22	17	40.00	
Beijing Guoan	6 January 2021	8 January 2022	29	9	8	12	31.03	
Watford	26 September 2022	7 March 2023	26	10	7	9	38.46	
Al-Fateh	8 July 2023	16 August 2024	36	13	9	14	36.11	
Croatia	13 July 2026	Present	6	2	0	4	33.33	
Career Total			518	230	133	155	44.40	

== Honours ==
=== Player ===
Hajduk Split

- Croatian First League: 1992
- Yugoslav Cup: 1990–91
- Croatian Cup: 1992–93, 1999–2000
- Croatian Super Cup: 1992

Croatia

- FIFA World Cup third-place: 1998

=== Manager ===
West Bromwich Albion

- EFL Championship runner-up: 2019–20

=== Individual ===
- Prva HNL Player of the Year: 1992
- Best Croatian footballer of 1997 by Novi list
- Best Croatian footballer of 1997 by Sportske novosti
- Ivica Jobo Kurtini Award: 1997
- Franjo Bučar State Award for Sport: 1998 (as player), 2007 (as manager)
- Media Servis person of the year: 2007
- Vatrena krila heart of the supporters Award: 2014
- Saudi Professional League Manager of the Month: January 2019

=== Orders ===
- Order of Danica Hrvatska with face of Franjo Bučar – 1995
- Order of the Croatian Trefoil – 1998
