= Joško Španjić =

Croatian footballer and manager

Josip Španjić
Personal information
- Full name: Josip Španjić
- Date of birth: 2 March 1966 (age 60)
- Place of birth: Split, SFR Yugoslavia
- Position: Defender

Team information
- Current team: Hajduk Split (academy)

Youth career
- 1976–1984: Hajduk Split

Senior career*
Years	Team	Apps	(Gls)
1984–1988	Hajduk Split	50	(1)
1988–1990	Balestier Khalsa		
1990–1991	Austria Klagenfurt		
1991–1995	Hajduk Split	58	(2)
1996–1999	Zadarkomerc	99	(12)

International career
1984–1988	Yugoslavia U21		
1989	Singapore		

Managerial career
- 2000: Dinara Knin
- 2001: NK Uskok
- 2002–2006: Hajduk Split (youth)
- 2007–2009: Hajduk Split (youth)
- 2009: Hajduk Split (caretaker)
- 2009–2010: Hajduk Split (assistant)
- 2011–2013: NK Primorac 1929
- 2013–2014: Dugopolje
- 2015–2016: Hajduk Split (assistant)
- 2016–2017: Al Ain U21
- 2017: Al Ain (caretaker)
- 2017–2019: Al Ain Reserve Team
- 2019: Hajduk Split (assistant)
- 2021: Hajduk Split (assistant)
- * Club domestic league appearances and goals

Josip "Joško" Španjić (born 2 March 1966) is a Croatian football manager and former player.

== Playing career ==
Španjić made his debut for Hajduk Split in 1984 and was a regular player under coach Stanko Poklepović. He gained fame at the time after his goal against Red Star Belgrade in 1985. In 1986, he joined the military and when he returned to Hajduk in 1987, he was dropped from the squad by the new coach from Bulgaria, Ivan Vutsov. After a six-month loan spell at NK Neretva, Španjić moved abroad and went to Singapore in order to play for Balestier Khalsa FC. In 1989, he and Boris Lučić became the first foreigners to play for the Singapore national football team. Later, he went to play for FC Kärnten in Austria where his countrymen Marin Kovačić was the manager.

In 1990, he returned to his native Split for family reasons. He was for six months without a club. In 1991, Stanko Poklepović returned to Hajduk and called Španjić to join the club. During his time at Hajduk, he won 3 titles and 2 cups. In 1996, he went to NK Zadarkomerc where he became the club captain and was part of their biggest triumph in 1998 when they finished 6th in the league. After Zadarkomerce, he played a few games for minor league clubs such as NK Mosor and NK Drinovci after finally retiring.

== Managerial career ==
After coaching minor league clubs, in the beginning, he was called by Igor Štimac in 2002 to join the Hajduk Split youth system as a coach. He managed the U-16 Hajduk squad and won two Croatian U-16 championships during that time. In 2009, he became the caretaker of the Hajduk Split first team for two games after manager Ivica Kalinić resigned due to health problems. Later, he became the assistant coach to Edoardo Reja and later to Stanko Poklepović.

In 2011, he took over NK Primorac 1929 which at the time was the Hajduk B team. In his first season, he managed to qualify for the Croatian Second Football League but in his second season, they were relegated. He took over NK Dugopolje in 2013 but resigned in March 2014.

In 2015, he was called by the new Hajduk Split manager Damir Burić to join him as assistant manager on which he agreed. He lost the job on 2 June 2016 after Damir Burić was sacked. On 9 July 2016, he joined Al Ain FC as a youth coach.

In January 2017, he became caretaker manager of Al Ain, after Zlatko Dalić was sacked. In his first match, Spanjic take late away win against fierce rival Al Ahli 2–1. Zoran Mamić took place of Al Ain manager and Spanjic became Al Ain Reserve Team manager. He stayed on that position until April 2019.

He took place of assistant manager of Damir Burić in Hajduk Split, after his call in June 2019. In 2021 he became assistant coach of the club's first team again, this time under Boro Primorac. He later returned to the club's academy, where he held several different positions. As of June 2024, Španjić was still part of Hajduk's academy.
