= Zlatko Dalić =

Croatian football manager (born 1966)

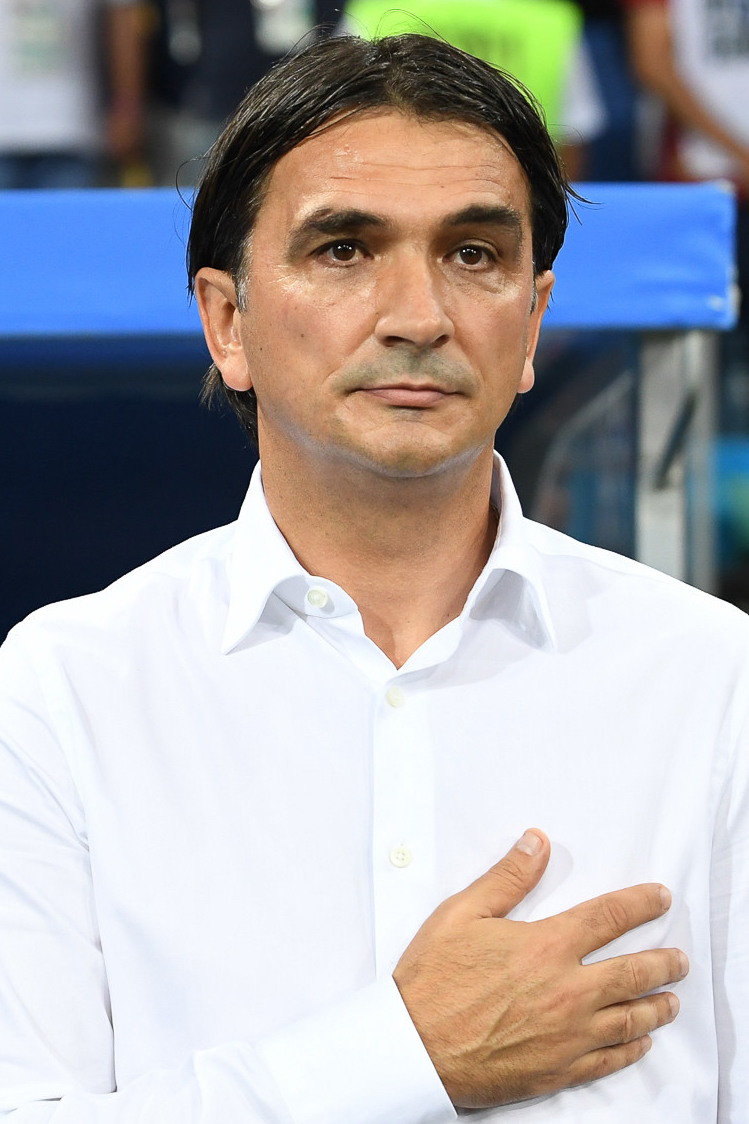
- Dalić as Croatia manager at the 2018 FIFA World Cup

Personal information
- Full name: Zlatko Dalić
- Date of birth: 26 October 1966 (age 60)
- Place of birth: Livno, SR Bosnia and Herzegovina, Yugoslavia
- Height: 1.79 m (5 ft 10 in)
- Position: Defensive midfielder

Team information
- Current team: United Arab Emirates (manager)

Youth career
- –1983: Troglav 1918

Senior career*
Years	Team	Apps	(Gls)
1983–1986	Hajduk Split	4	(0)
1986–1987	Dinamo Vinkovci	12	(0)
1987–1988	Hajduk Split	5	(0)
1988–1989	Budućnost Titograd	7	(0)
1989–1991	Velež Mostar	37	(3)
1992–1996	Varteks	108	(13)
1996–1998	Hajduk Split	28	(1)
1998–2000	Varteks	11	(1)
Total		247	(23)

Managerial career
- 2004: Varteks (caretaker)
- 2005–2007: Varteks
- 2007–2008: Rijeka
- 2008–2009: Dinamo Tirana
- 2009–2010: Slaven Belupo
- 2010–2012: Al Faisaly
- 2012–2013: Al Hilal
- 2014–2017: Al Ain
- 2017–2026: Croatia
- 2026–: United Arab Emirates
Medal record
Representing Croatia (as manager)
FIFA World Cup
Silver medal – second place	2018 Russia	Team
Bronze medal – third place	2022 Qatar	Team
UEFA Nations League
Silver medal – second place	2023 Netherlands	Team
- * Club domestic league appearances and goals

Zlatko Dalić (Croatian pronunciation: [zlâtko dǎːlitɕ]; born 26 October 1966) is a Croatian professional manager and former player who is currently manager of the United Arab Emirates national team. He is best known for serving as manager of the Croatia national team from 2017 to 2026. As a footballer, he played as a defensive midfielder, and spent most of his career primarily with Hajduk Split – during the 1980s and 1990s – and won the 1983–84 Yugoslav Cup with the club. Dalić's managerial career at the club level was predominantly with emerging teams in the Middle East; namely Al-Faisaly, Al-Hilal, and Al Ain, where he collectively won four trophies.

As an international manager, he has led Croatia to a second and third place finish at the 2018 and 2022 FIFA World Cups, respectively, securing two World Cup medals. He led the team to second-place and a silver medal in the 2023 UEFA Nations League, later winning the 2024 FIFA Series. As the longest-serving head coach of Croatia, he is regarded as the greatest manager in the team's history. He resigned as Croatia manager at the conclusion of the nation's 2026 FIFA World Cup run. Dalić's management style is known for midfield control, tactical efficiency, and advanced sports psychology.

== Playing career ==
During his time as a player, Dalić played for a number of clubs as a defensive midfielder. He started off his youth career at Troglav 1918 Livno, before joining Hajduk Split in 1983 and thus starting his senior career. He stayed at Hajduk Split until 1986, after joining Cibalia, which was at that time known as Dinamo Vinkovci. Apart from Hajduk Split and Cibalia, Dalić also played for Budućnost Titograd, Velež Mostar and Varteks. He finished his career at Varteks in 2000.

== Managerial career ==
=== Varteks ===
After ending his playing career in 2000, he became assistant coach at Varteks. From May 2002 to May 2005, Dalić worked as the club's sports director, and during the 2003–04 and 2004–05 seasons he simultaneously acted as assistant coach for Miroslav Blažević.

In May 2005, he was appointed manager of Varteks and in his first season at the helm he won third place in the Croatian First League and reached the final of the Croatian Cup. In the first leg of the final, which was played in Rijeka, Varteks lost 0–4 to HNK Rijeka. In the second leg in Varaždin, Dalić nearly created a sensation leading the team to a 5–1 win, but they were one goal short of winning the competition.

=== Rijeka ===
In the summer of 2007, after his contract with Varteks ended, he became manager of Rijeka, and finished fourth at the end of the 2007–08 season. After being knocked out of the 2008 UEFA Intertoto Cup by FK Renova, Dalić was sacked on 1 July 2008 just before the start of the season.

=== Dinamo Tirana ===
In the 2008–09 season, Dalić managed Albanian champions Dinamo Tirana, with whom he won the Albanian Supercup. He resigned in February 2009 after losing two derbies in a row versus fellow capital teams Tirana and Partizani.

=== Slaven Belupo ===
After a short stint in Albania, he returned to Croatia in 2009 and took over his third Croatian football club, Slaven Belupo.

=== Al Faisaly ===
In the 2010–11 season, he became head coach of Al-Faisaly. At the end of the 2010–11 season under Dalić the club enjoyed the greatest success in its history, qualifying for the King's Cup in the Saudi Professional League. Dalić was named Coach of the Year in the Saudi Professional League for the 2010–11 season by Al Riyadh newspapers. In the selection, he beat other more famous coaches working in Saudi Arabia at the time, such as Gabriel Calderón, Walter Zenga and Eric Gerets.

=== Al Hilal ===
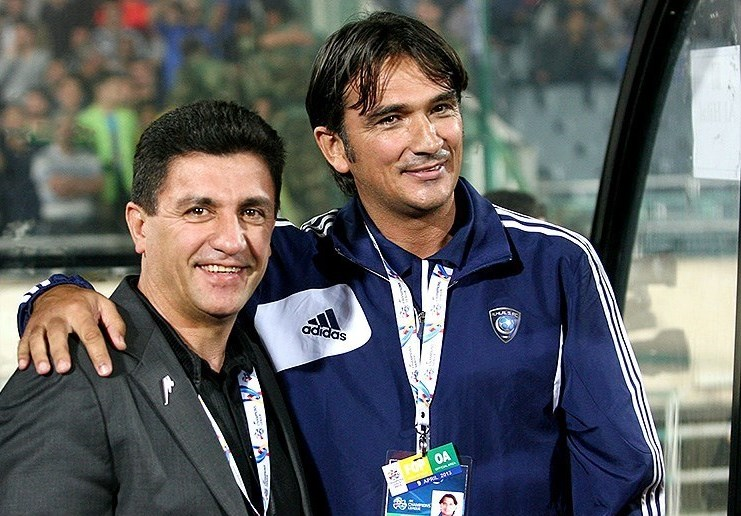
Dalić (right) coaching Al Hilal

On 3 May 2012, Dalić signed a contract with Saudi Arabian club Al-Hilal to manage their B team. On 30 January, Al-Hilal agreed with Dalić to coach the first team following the sacking of Antoine Kombouaré. On 9 February 2013, he made his managerial debut with Al-Hilal against his old club Al-Faisaly in the semi-final of the 2012–13 Saudi Crown Prince Cup. Dalić eventually led Al-Hilal to the cup title–the team's sixth consecutive win–which was also Dalić's second major title in his coaching career. During the 2013–14 season, he was the main candidate for the position of sports director at Croatian club Hajduk Split.

=== Al Ain ===
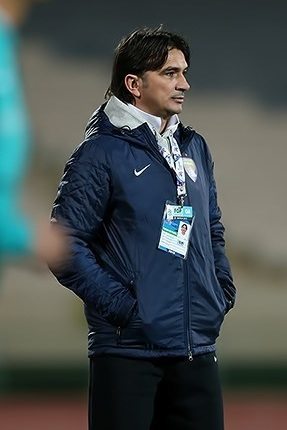
Zlatko Dalić managing Al-Ain against Naft Tehran, during the 2015 AFC Champions League

On 8 March 2014, Dalić was appointed manager of Al-Ain in the United Arab Emirates after the team had sacked Quique Sánchez Flores. In his first season, he led the team to finish top of their group in the 2014 AFC Champions League, which was the first time since 2006 that the club progressed through the group stage. On 30 April 2014, Al-Ain announced that Dalić would remain head coach for the next two seasons. In the round of sixteen of the 2014 AFC Champions League, Al-Ain beat Al-Jazira by 4–2 to advance to the quarter-finals; in the quarter-finals, the team beat Al-Ittihad 5–1 to advance to the semi-finals, ultimately losing 4–2 to Al-Hilal, which was Dalić's former team.

On 18 May 2014, Al-Ain won the final game of UAE President's Cup against league champions Al-Ahli 1–0, which secured Dalić's first trophy as manager of Al-Ain. Dalić won the title of Best Coach of 2014 for his performances; at the end of the first round of the UAE Pro-League, Al–Ain took the first position with one game in hand. Eventually, Al-Ain won their 12th UAE Pro-League title in the 2014–15 season. The club finished the season eleven points above runners-up Al Jazira and Al Shabab, only losing two games throughout the season; in this season, they also achieved several records, namely conceding the fewest goals (19), the longest unbeaten run (15 matches), the longest winning run (eight matches) and the biggest home win against Ajman (7–1). On 12 July 2015, Dalić received the Coach of the Year accolade during the UAE Pro-League award ceremony for the 2014–15 UAE Pro-League season for guiding his side to winning the league title.

Dalić's first match of the 2015–16 season was a UAE Super Cup match between Al-Ain and Al-Nasr, played on 15 August and resulted in victory for Al-Ain, which won 4–2. Following a 3–0 win against Al-Ahli in the tenth round of the UAE Pro-League on 5 December, Dalić became the best coach in the league's history since it turned professional, though Al-Ain ultimately finished second in the league in 2016. The club also reached the 2016 AFC Champions League final, ultimately losing 2–3 to Jeonbuk Motors. Dalić's tenure as manager of Al-Ain saw the club rise rapidly in the Football Database Ranking; initially, the club was ranked 335th in March 2014, when Dalić arrived, and by the time of his departure, the club was ranked 122nd in the world, also reaching fifth position in Asia, according to the ranking. Dalić formally departed Al-Ain in January 2017, citing fatigue as his reason for departing.

=== Croatia ===
Dalić was announced the head coach of the Croatia national football team on 7 October 2017. His appointment by the Croatian Football Federation followed the dismissal of Ante Čačić due to an extended series of poor results. Upon arrival, Dalić announced that he would only remain head coach if Croatia successfully qualified for the 2018 FIFA World Cup. On 19 October, Dalić named Ivica Olić, former Croatia international player, as his assistant manager. He led Croatia to qualify for the 2018 World Cup undefeated for their first five matches. That year's World Cup campaign became known as Croatia's second "golden generation", referencing their 1998 counterparts. Following this, Dalić officially signed a contract with the Croatian Football Federation, running until 30 July 2020, and would reportedly earn around €500,000 per year. The team topped their group with a 2–0 victory over Nigeria, a 3–0 win over Argentina, and a 2–1 win against Iceland – a best-ever group stage performance.

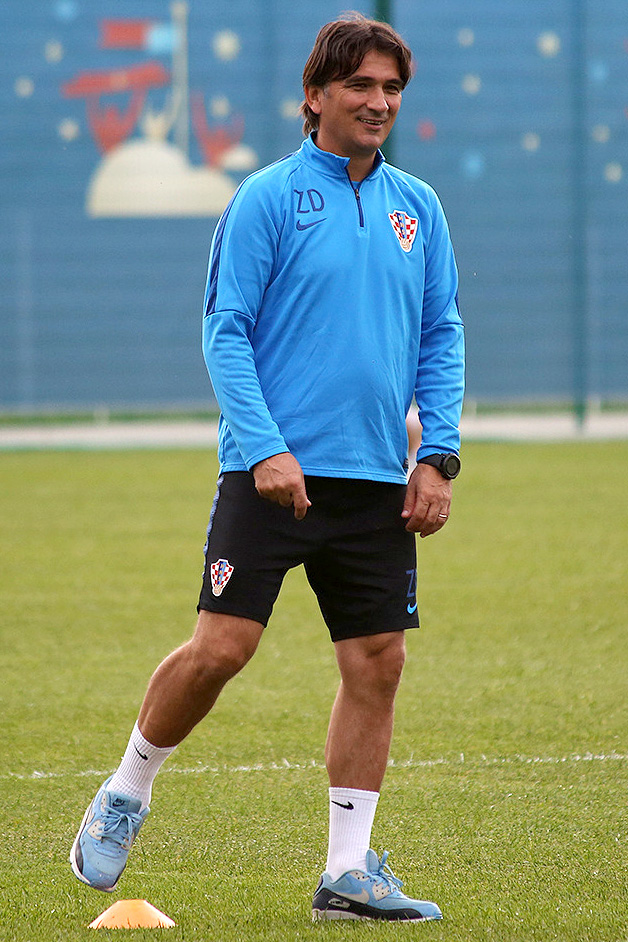
Zlatko Dalić during a Croatia training session; ahead of the 2018 FIFA World Cup

During the knockout stage, they beat Denmark in a penalty shoot-out for the first time after goalkeeper Danijel Subašić saved three penalties, equalling the record for most penalties saved in a shoot-out. In the quarter-finals, Croatia drew 2–2 with hosts Russia, becoming the first team since 1990 to win two consecutive penalty shoot-outs. Playing England in the semi-finals, Croatia equalized to force their third consecutive extra time, matching the tournament record. Mario Mandžukić and Perišić scored as Croatia won 2–1 making them the second-smallest country by population (after Uruguay) and land area (after the Netherlands) to reach a World Cup final. In the final they lost to France 4–2, finishing in second place and securing the silver medal. Dalić and the team were welcomed by an estimated half a million people at their homecoming in Zagreb. For the achievement, he received the Franjo Bučar State Award for Sport Award.

The team entered the Nations League's inaugural 2018–19 edition in League A, along with England and Spain in January 2018. Croatia lost 6–0 away to Spain in their first game, the side's record loss in a match. Croatia drew 0–0 home with England, played behind closed doors due to UEFA sanctions. In a rematch with the Spanish, Croatia won 3–2 with a goal in stoppage time, followed by a 2–1 away defeat to England.

The team topped their group for the qualifying campaign of Euro 2020, with a loss to Hungary, and draws against Azerbaijan and Wales. The 2020 finals were delayed to the summer of 2021 due to the COVID-19 pandemic. Overall, winning only two out of eight games in 2020, Croatia achieved their worst-ever aggregate win-rate. Croatia finished second in their Euros group, with a 1–0 loss to England, a 1–1 draw with the Czech Republic and a 3–1 win over Scotland. They advanced to the round of 16, where they lost to Spain 5–3 after extra time. The loss to Spain led to heightened criticism against Dalić by the Croatian public, a faction of whom called for resignations. Dalić refreshed the team roster by introducing younger debutants for the remainder of World Cup qualifying in 2021. Applauded for his successful handling of the national team after the retirement of seasoned players Mario Mandžukić and Danijel Subašić, he integrated newer counterparts Bruno Petković, Josip Brekalo and Nikola Vlašić into the team. Dalić signed a new contract on 23 July 2020 slated until the end of 2022, earning an annual salary of €1.6 million.

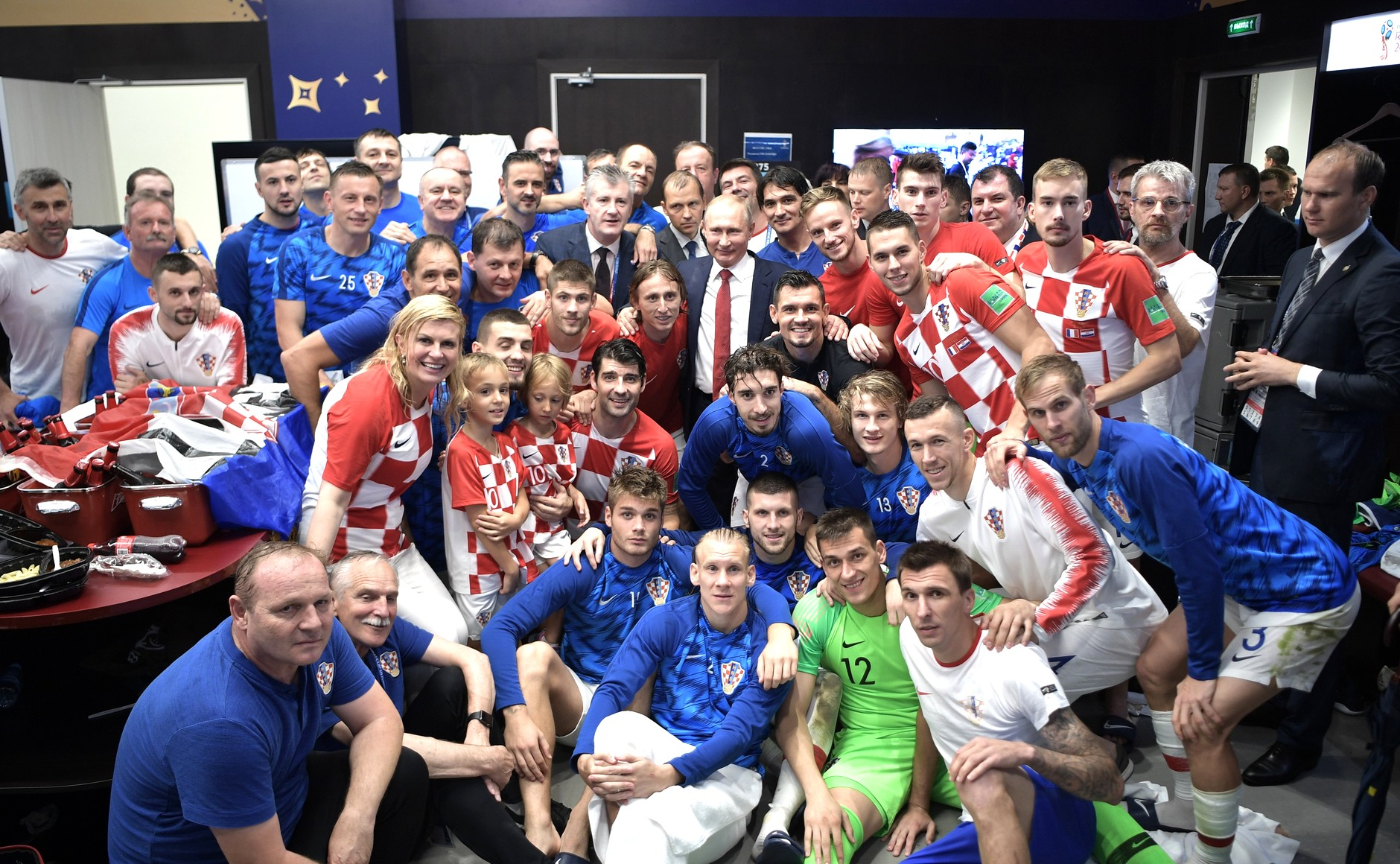
Dalić (center) alongside his team with Vladimir Putin and Kolinda Grabar-Kitarović after the 2018 World Cup Final

Croatia qualified for the 2022 World Cup with seven wins, two draws and one loss. The team advanced from group stage after a 0–0 draw with Morocco, a 4–1 win against Canada, and finished ahead of Belgium by a single point after drawing 0–0. They won against Japan in a penalty shootout in the round of 16 where Dominik Livaković saved three of four Japanese penalties, equalling a record held by Ricardo and Danijel Subašić. Croatia similarly beat Brazil during the quarter-finals in an upset victory on penalties, having come from behind to draw 1–1 in the final minutes of extra time. In the semi-final match, Croatia sustained their heaviest World Cup defeat, 3–0 against Argentina. They prevailed 2–1 over Morocco in the third place playoff, securing their second bronze medal and Dalić's second World Cup medal for Croatia.

The team topped their group in the 2023 Nations League, knocking out reigning champions France by winning 1–0 on a penalty – their first-ever win against the French. Croatia beat the Netherlands 4–2 in the semi-finals, advancing to their first Nations League final, against Spain. After drawing the Spanish 0–0 in extra time, the team lost the penalty shootout 4–5, finishing the tournament in second place. Croatia finished second in qualifying for Euro 2024, being drawn into a "group of death" with Spain, Italy, and Albania. The Italians eliminated Croatia from advancing to the knockout stage, on points, with a 98th minute stoppage-time goal from striker Mattia Zaccagni. In August 2024, Dalić controversially praised the national team's traditional values while condemning a "loud minority" that he claimed "does not love and does not want Croatia." They went on to win the 2024 FIFA Series tournament, Croatia's first international friendly championship.

Croatia topped their qualifying group undefeated for the 2026 World Cup – with 7 wins and 1 draw – in their best qualification run to date. After finishing second in group stage, they advanced to the knockout stage. They were knocked out by Portugal in a 2–1 defeat where an equalizing 103rd-minute stoppage-time goal from Joško Gvardiol was disallowed as offside by snickometer-enabled VAR. Dalić was highly critical of the technical refereeing and disallowed equalizer from his side. After nine years as head coach, Dalić stepped down from the position as his contract expired following the conclusion of the World Cup. He was officially succeeded by Slaven Bilić on 13 July 2026.

=== United Arab Emirates ===
On 12 August 2026, Dalić was appointed head coach of the United Arab Emirates national football team following the dismissal of Cosmin Olăroiu.

== Management style ==
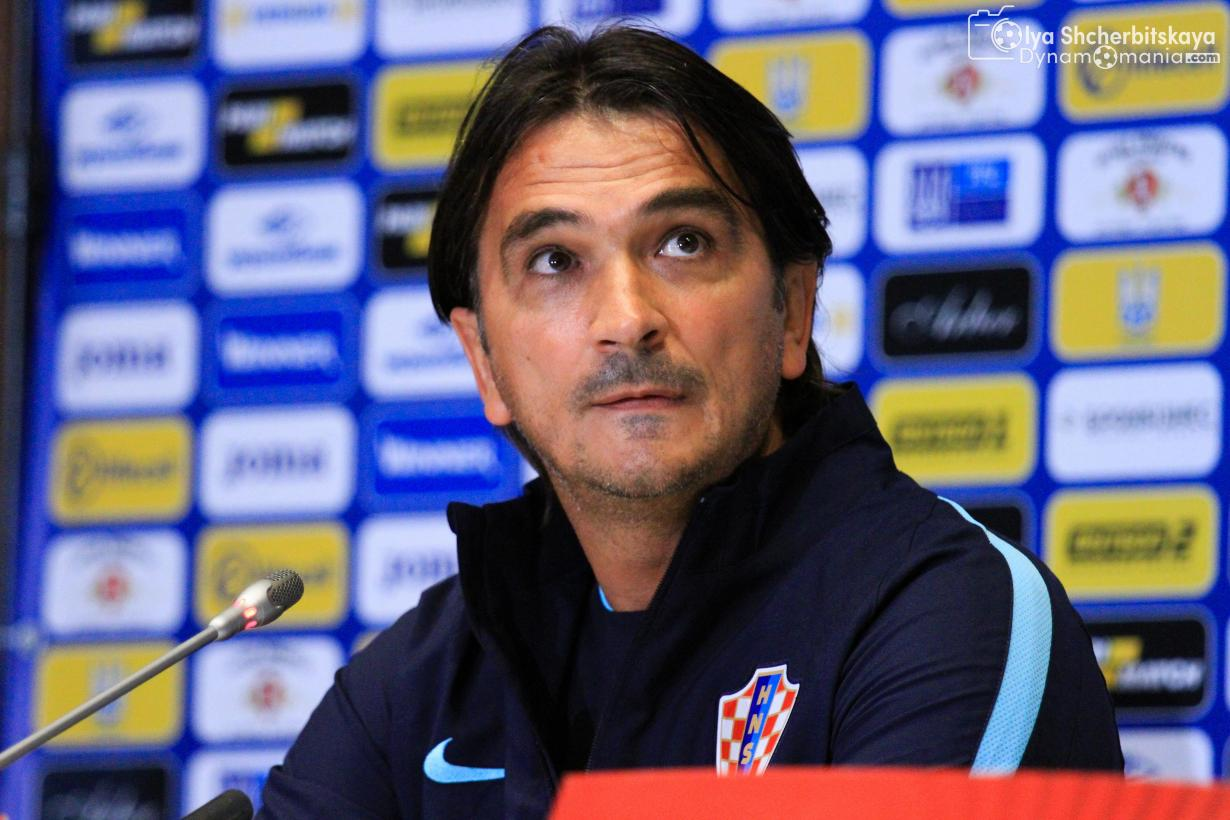
Dalić during a press conference in 2018

As the longest-serving head coach of Croatia, he is regarded as the greatest manager in the team's history. Dalić describes a relationship of trust with his players as key to his coaching philosophy. "If I can respect my players to the maximum, they will follow suit, they will respect me. There is no time for discussions or quarrels." An ESPN analysis found that Dalić retains tactical maneuverability through the midfield because, he believes, the "best defense is a good offense." Advanced sport psychology has been identified as a key marker of Dalić's management style. He is known for his effective integration—so-called zajedništvo—of newer and seasoned players throughout the 2010s and 2020s. Dalić explained in 2026 that "hierarchy is very important; this is not a club, this is a national team." He dismissed striker Nikola Kalinić for impacting "squad harmony" after the player refused to play during a match. The New York Times found that he was "forward-thinking" with gameplay analysis and uses reactive on-field player feedback to switch in-game tactics dynamically. He measures players by their efficiency and work rate during trainings to ensure starting squads reflect the team's maximal output.

== Personal life ==
Born on 26 October 1966, in Livno, then a part of SR Bosnia and Herzegovina, within Yugoslavia, part of modern-day Bosnia and Herzegovina. The Dalić family hail from the Croat community of Bosnia through which he holds Croatian citizenship as an ethnic Croat.

In 1992, Dalić married his wife, Davorka, whom he met at a high school in Livno. They have two children. Dalić is a practicing Catholic and prays the Rosary during every match. In 2023, Dalić opened a football team restaurant in the Croatian city of Varaždin.

== Playing statistics ==
Club performance			League		Cup		Continental		Total	
Season	Club	League	Apps	Goals	Apps	Goals	Apps	Goals	Apps	Goals
Yugoslavia			League		Yugoslav Cup		Europe		Total	
1983–84	Hajduk Split	Yugoslav First League	0	0	—		—		0	0
1984–85	Hajduk Split	Yugoslav First League	0	0	—		—		0	0
1985–86	Hajduk Split	Yugoslav First League	4	0	1	0	0	0	5	0
1986–87	Dinamo Vinkovci (loan)	Yugoslav First League	12	0	1	0	—		13	0
1987–88	Hajduk Split	Yugoslav First League	5	0	0	0	0	0	0	0
1988–89	Budućnost Titograd	Yugoslav First League	7	0	—		—		7	0
1989–90	Velež Mostar	Yugoslav First League	24	1	—		—		24	1
1990–91	Velež Mostar	Yugoslav First League	12	2	1	0	—		13	2
Croatia			League		Croatian Cup		Europe		Total	
1992–93	Varteks	Prva HNL	22	2	6	0	—		13	1
1993–94	Varteks	Prva HNL	32	8	5	1	—		37	9
1994–95	Varteks	Prva HNL	27	3	5	0	—		32	3
1995–96	Varteks	Prva HNL	27	0	9	3	—		36	3
1996–97	Hajduk Split	Prva HNL	22	1	1	1	2	0	25	2
1997–98	Hajduk Split	Prva HNL	6	0	1	0	3	0	10	0
1997–98	Varteks (loan)	Prva HNL	11	1	2	0	—		13	1
1998–99	Varteks	Prva HNL	23	2	3	0	5	0	31	2
1999–00	Varteks	Prva HNL	13	1	2	0	5	0	20	1
Country	Yugoslavia		64	3	3	0	0	0	67	3
Country	Croatia		183	18	34	5	15	0	232	23
Country	Total		247	23	37	5	15	0	299	28

== Managerial statistics ==
As of 17 November 2026

Managerial record by team and tenure
Team	Nat	From	To	Record							
Team	Nat	From	To	G	W	D	L	GF	GA	GD	Win %
Varteks Varaždin	(Croatia)	11 September 2004	18 September 2004	2	1	0	1	4	3	+1	50.00
Varteks Varaždin	(Croatia)	20 July 2005	19 May 2007	82	34	13	35	136	140	−4	41.46
Rijeka	(Croatia)	20 July 2007	28 June 2008	35	15	11	9	57	44	+13	42.86
Dinamo Tirana	(Albania)	17 August 2008	4 February 2009	23	10	8	5	30	15	+15	43.48
Slaven Belupo	(Croatia)	9 August 2009	13 May 2010	32	12	10	10	46	49	−3	37.50
Al-Faisaly	(Saudi Arabia)	15 August 2010	27 April 2012	55	17	14	24	79	101	−22	30.91
Al-Hilal	(Saudi Arabia)	9 February 2013	22 May 2013	20	11	6	3	32	23	+9	55.00
Al-Ain	(United Arab Emirates)	12 March 2014	23 January 2017	155	83	40	32	291	172	+119	53.55
Croatia	(Croatia)	7 October 2017	8 July 2026	111	57	26	28	189	129	+60	51.35
United Arab Emirates	(United Arab Emirates)	12 August 2026	Present	7	5	1	1	16	6	+10	71.43
Career Total				522	245	129	148	880	682	+198	46.93

== Honours ==
=== Player ===
Hajduk Split

- Yugoslav Cup: 1983–84

=== Manager ===
Varteks

- Croatian Cup runner-up: 2005–06

Dinamo Tirana

- Albanian Supercup: 2008

Al-Hilal

- Saudi Crown Prince Cup: 2012–13
- Saudi Professional League runner-up: 2012–13

Al-Ain

- UAE President's Cup: 2013–14
- UAE Pro-League: 2014–15
- UAE Super Cup: 2015
- AFC Champions League runner-up: 2016

Croatia

- FIFA World Cup
  - (silver) Runners-up (1): 2018
  - (bronze) Third place (1): 2022
- UEFA Nations League
  - (silver) Runners-up (1): 2023
- FIFA Series:
  - (gold) Champions (1): 2024

== Orders ==
- Order of Duke Trpimir with Ribbon and Star (2018)
- Honorary citizen of Varaždin County (2018) and Tomislavgrad (2023)
- Veliko zlatno srce ("Great Golden Heart"), conferred by Croatian war veterans associations (2018)

== Bibliography ==
- Rusija naših snova (Russia of Our Dreams), Sportske novosti: Zagreb, 2018, ISBN 978-953-96701-6-8 (1st ed.), ISBN 978-953-96701-8-2 (2nd ed.)
