= Stanko Poklepović =

Croatian footballer and manager (1938–2018)

Personal information
- Date of birth: 19 April 1938
- Place of birth: Split, Kingdom of Yugoslavia (modern Croatia)
- Date of death: 24 December 2018 (aged 80)
- Place of death: Split, Croatia
- Height: 1.87 m (6 ft 2 in)

Senior career*
| Years | Team | Apps | (Gls) |
| 1956–1976 | RNK Split | | |

Managerial career
- 1969: RNK Split
- 1971–1972: RNK Split
- 1981: GOŠK-Jug
- 1981–1983: Solin
- 1984–1986: Hajduk Split
- 1987–1989: Budućnost Titograd
- 1989–1990: Borac Banja Luka
- 1990–1991: APOEL
- 1991–1993: Hajduk Split
- 1992–1993: Croatia
- 1994: HNK Dubrovnik
- 1994–1995: Iran
- 1995–1997: Persepolis
- 1997–1998: Publikum Celje
- 1998–1999: Osijek
- 1999–2000: Ferencváros
- 2001–2002: Sepahan
- 2002–2003: Osijek
- 2005: Sepahan
- 2009: Damash Gilan
- 2010: Hajduk Split
- 2015: Hajduk Split
- * Club domestic league appearances and goals

Stanko "Špaco" Poklepović (19 April 1938 – 24 December 2018) was a Croatian professional football player and manager.

Poklepović managed a number of teams over 46 years, including Hajduk Split on four occasions. He was also the first manager to win the Croatian First Football League with Hajduk Split, in its inaugural season, in 1992.

== Playing career ==
Throughout his whole career, Poklepović played for RNK Split, between 1956 and 1976, and won the Yugoslav Second League twice, first in the 1956–57 (Zone I) season, and then after in the 1959–60 (West) season.

== Coaching career ==
He made his impact in the 1984–85 Yugoslav First League as a manager of Hajduk Split when he took over the Yugoslav powerhouse at the time when many important players left the club and many young players like Asanović, Andrijašević and Španjić joined the club with no experience. Poklepović almost won the league but finished 2nd because of match-fixing that was popular with other clubs in the league. Hajduk broke the record and scored 2 or more goals in every match that season.

In the 1985–86 UEFA Cup, Poklepović lead Hajduk to the quarter-finals. Poklepović won the first leg match against Waregem 1–0 on Poljud but he was then sacked from Hajduk for under-performing in the league so he didn't manage the second leg game against Waregem which Hajduk lost on penalties after a 0–1 defeat.

In 1991, he returned to Hajduk, winning the 1992 Prva HNL which was Poklepović's first league trophy in his career. In 1992, he took over the Croatia national football team, but after 4 games and only 1 win, he left the team.

In 1994, he went to manage the Iran national football team and Persepolis. He won the 1995–96 Azadegan League and the 1996–97 Azadegan League with Persepolis.

In 1998, he took over Osijek and won the 1998–99 Croatian Cup which is Osijek's first and only trophy till today. He also finished 4th in the Prva HNL the same season and secured a place in European competitions for Osijek. He returned again to Iran in 2005 and 2009, but unsuccessfully.

In February 2010, he returned to Hajduk Split for the third time. He won the 2009–10 Croatian Cup and finished 2nd in the Prva HNL the same season. He qualified with Hajduk for the 2010–11 UEFA Europa League after defeating Dinamo București and Unirea Urziceni in the qualifying rounds. In the 2010–11 Prva HNL, he controlled the 1st position for a while and became a favorite of the fans and the media. In the Europa League, he defeated Anderlecht 1–0 on Poljud, which was Hajduk's biggest European victory since the mid 1990s. After losing a cup game against Istra 1961 in the round of 16 and losing the 1st position in the league, he was sacked by Hajduk chairman Joško Svaguša on 27 October 2010.

In February 2015, five years later, Poklepović returned again to Hajduk Split for the fourth time in his career, but later in April, he was sacked because of underperforming in the league.

== Death ==
Poklepović died on 24 December 2018, at Split Hospital, after a long battle with health issues, aged 80.

== Quotes ==
- Look at this, they call me funnel, then they said, the Špaco funnel. Go to hell you and that funnel. You don't know what is a funnel or what is a defense.
  - After being asked by a reporter to elaborate his defense tactics which Poklepović compared to a funnel
- I asked Ahmad what is a penetration and he looks at me confused. I elaborate to him that penetration is a process in which the male penis enters the female vagina, and when I asked him what is ecstasy, half of the dressing room started laughing on the floor. I am a coach that educates, I speak about everything, even sex.
  - When asked about Ahmad Sharbini's limited playing time
- Excuse me?! Please don't ask me that! What bunker, we had 8 chances to score while they had 10. Where is the bunker there?! What are you talking about, you should quit journalism.
  - When accused by a reporter of using bunker tactics after winning the 2010 Croatian Cup against NK Šibenik
- I feel great, mentally and physically. I may be too old for sex, but not for football.
  - After becoming manager of Hajduk Split for the fourth time in his career at the age of 77
- In Croatian, there are no attributes which can describe the greatness of Hajduk Split. Hajduk is not only immortal, Hajduk is indestructible
  - When asked to describe what is Hajduk Split

== Managerial statistics ==
As of 4 November 2017

Managerial record by team and tenure
| Team | From | To | Record | | | | |
| Team | From | To | P | W | D | L | Win % |
|---|---|---|---|---|---|---|---|
| Hajduk Split | 1984 | 1986 | 68 | 33 | 19 | 16 | 48.5 |
| Budućnost Titograd | 1987 | 1989 | 57 | 24 | 17 | 16 | 42.1 |
| Borac Banja Luka | 1989 | 1990 | 19 | 12 | 3 | 4 | 63.2 |
| APOEL | 1990 | 1991 | 34 | 15 | 10 | 9 | 44.1 |
| Hajduk Split | 1991 | 1993 | 69 | 42 | 18 | 9 | 60.9 |
| Croatia | 1992 | 1993 | 4 | 1 | 1 | 2 | 25.0 |
| Dubrovnik | 1994 | 1994 | 13 | 3 | 3 | 7 | 23.1 |
| Iran | 1994 | 1996 | 4 | 1 | 2 | 1 | 25.0 |
| Istra | 1995 | 1995 | 7 | 1 | 0 | 6 | 14.3 |
| Persepolis F.C. | 1995 | 1997 | 54 | 31 | 8 | 15 | 57.4 |
| Publikum Celje | 1997 | 1998 | 39 | 16 | 7 | 16 | 41.0 |
| Mladost 127 | 1998 | 1999 | 11 | 4 | 1 | 6 | 36.4 |
| Osijek | 1998 | 1999 | 12 | 6 | 4 | 2 | 50.0 |
| Ferencvárosi TC | 1999 | 2000 | 33 | 14 | 8 | 11 | 42.4 |
| NK Osijek | 2002 | 2003 | 17 | 5 | 6 | 6 | 29.4 |
| Hajduk Split | 2010 | 2010 | 39 | 23 | 10 | 6 | 59.0 |
| Hajduk Split | 2015 | 2015 | 9 | 2 | 3 | 4 | 22.2 |
| Total | | | 489 | 233 | 120 | 136 | 47.6 |

== Honours ==
=== Player ===
Split

- Yugoslav Second League: 1956–57 (Zone I), 1959–60 (West)

=== Manager ===
Hajduk Split

- Prva HNL: 1992
- Croatian Cup: 2009–10
- Croatian Supercup: 1992

Persepolis

- Azadegan League (changed later to Persian Gulf Pro League): 1995–96, 1996–97

Osijek

- Croatian Cup: 1998–99

Awards and achievements
| Preceded by Bijan Zolfagharnasab | Iran Pro League Winning Manager; 1995–96, 1996–97 | Succeeded by Nasser Hejazi |
