= Stjepan Andrijašević =

Croatian footballer (born 1967)

Personal information
- Date of birth: 7 February 1967 (age 59)
- Place of birth: Split, SR Croatia, Yugoslavia
- Height: 1.85 m (6 ft 1 in)
- Position: Midfielder

Senior career*
Years	Team	Apps	(Gls)
1983–1992	Hajduk Split	132	(27)
1993	Monaco	7	(1)
1993	Hajduk Split	6	(1)
1993–1994	Celta Vigo	25	(8)
1994–1995	Hajduk Split	11	(4)
1995–1998	Rayo Vallecano	48	(10)
Total		229	(51)

International career
1992–1994	Croatia	5	(0)

Managerial career
- 2011: Hajduk Split (assistant)
- * Club domestic league appearances and goals

Stjepan "Stipe" Andrijašević (born 7 February 1967) is a Croatian former professional footballer played as a midfielder.

== Club career ==
Andrijašević made his debut for local club Hajduk Split in 1983 and played in the 1994–95 UEFA Champions League knockout stage for them.

== International career ==
Andrijašević made his debut for Croatia in an October 1992 friendly match against Mexico and earned a total of five caps. His final international was an August 1994 friendly away against Israel.

== Personal life ==
In September 1989 Andrijašević was injured in road accident while riding his motorcycle which took him out of football for more than two years. He has two sons, Pjero (born 1988) and Franko (born 1991), and both of them are football players.
