= Damir =

- Gender: Male

Other gender
- Feminine: Damira

Origin
- Origin: Serbo-Croatian, Turkic
- Meaning: Peace giver, iron

Other names
- Variant form: Demir

Damir is a male given name.

In the Balkans, Damir is popular among Bosniaks, Croats, and Serbs in the former Yugoslav nations, where it is interpreted as a locally originated given name, derived from da- meaning "give" and mir meaning "peace." In Croatia, the name Damir was among the most popular masculine given names between the 1960s and 1990s. This region also has a female equivalent of the name: Damira.

The name also appears in Central Asia and Turkic regions of Russia (see Tatar names), where it is considered a variation of the Turkic name "Demir", which means iron. During the Soviet era, Damir (Дамир) was also used as an acronym for "Да здравствует мировая революция", meaning "Long Live the World Revolution".

== Given name ==
- Damir Amangeldin (born 2002), Kazakh actor and comedian
- Damir Bajs (born 1964), Croatian politician
- Damir Bičanić (born 1985), Croatian handball player
- Damir Bjelopoljak (born 1979), Bosnian volleyball player
- Damir Botonjič (born 1981), Slovenian football player
- Damir Burić (disambiguation), several people
- Damir Čakar (born 1973), Montenegrin football player
- Damir Čeković (born 1990), Serbian football player
- Damir Čerkić (born 1969), Bosnian football player
- Damir Desnica (born 1956), Croatian football player
- Damir Dokić (1959–2025), father of Serbian Australian tennis player Jelena Dokić
- Damir Doma (born 1981), German fashion designer of Croatian descent
- Damir Drinić (born 1989), Serbian football player
- Damir Dugonjič (born 1988), Slovenian swimmer
- Damir Džidić (born 1987), Croatian football player of Bosnia and Herzegovina descent
- Damir Džombić (born 1985), Bosnian football player
- Damir Džumhur (born 1992), Bosnian tennis player
- Damir Fejzić (born 1994), Serbian taekwondo practitioner
- Damir Glavan (born 1974), Croatian water polo player
- Damir Hadžić (footballer, born 1978) (born 1978), Bosnian-Herzegovinian footballer
- Damir Hadžić (footballer, born 1984) (born 1984), Slovenian footballer
- Damir Ibrahimović (1965–2025), Bosnian film producer
- Damir Ibrić (born 1984), Bosnian football player
- Damir Ismagulov (born 1991), Russian-Kazakhstani mixed martial artist.
- Damir Jurković (born 1970), Croatian football player
- Damir Kahriman (born 1984), Serbian footballer of Romani descent
- Damir Kajin (born 1962), Croatian politician
- Damir Kaletović, Bosnian journalist
- Damir Kasabulat (born 2002), Kazakh footballer
- Damir Kedžo (born 1987), Croatian singer
- Damir Keretić (born 1960), German tennis player of Croatian descent
- Damir Kreilach (born 1989), Croatian football player
- Damir Krupalija (born 1979), Bosnian basketball player
- Damir Krznar (born 1972), Croatian football player
- Damir Kukuruzović (1975–2020), Croatian jazz guitarist
- Damir Lesjak (born 1967), Croatian football player
- Damir Maričić (born 1959), Croatian football player
- Damir Markota (born 1985), Bosnian basketball player
- Damir Martin (born 1988), Croatian rower
- Damir Matovinović (born 1940), Croatian football referee
- Damir Mehić (born 1987), Swedish footballer of Bosnian descent
- Damir Memišević (born 1984), Bosnian football player
- Damir Mikec (born 1984), Serbian sport shooter
- Damir Milinović (born 1972), Croatian football player and manager
- Damir Mirvić (born 1982), Bosnian football player
- Damir Mršić (born 1970), Bosnian basketball player
- Damir Mulaomerović (born 1974), Croatian basketball player of Bosnian descent
- Damir Nikšić (born 1970), Bosnian conceptual artist
- Damir Pekič (born 1979), Slovenian football player
- Damir Pertič (born 1981), Slovenian futsal player
- Damir Petravić (born 1963), Croatian football player and manager
- Damir Polančec (born 1967), Croatian politician
- Damir Puškar (born 1987), Slovenian futsal player
- Damir Rančić (born 1983), Croatian basketball player
- Damir Rašić (born 1988), Croatian football player
- Damir Rilje (born 1958), Croatian politician
- Damir Ryspayev (born 1995), Kazakh professional ice hockey defenceman
- Damir Sadikov (born 1991), Russian football player
- Damir Salimov (1937–2019), Uzbek film director
- Damir Shadaev (born 1967), Russian politician
- Damir Siraciev (born 1954), Tatar theatre director and actor
- Damir Skomina (born 1976), Slovenian football referee
- Damir Stojak (born 1975), Serbian football player
- Damir Škaro (born 1959), Croatian boxer
- Damir Šolman (1948–2023), Croatian basketball player
- Damir Šovšić (born 1990), Croatian football player of Bosnian descent
- Damir Špica (born 1962), Bosnian football player
- Damir Šutevski (1954–2020), Yugoslavian-Canadian association football player
- Damir Urban (born 1968), Croatian musician
- Damir Vitas (born 1981), Croatian footballer
- Damir Vrabac (born 1962), Bosnian football player
- Damir Vrančić (born 1985), Bosnian footballer of Croatian descent
- Damir Zaynullin (died 2007), Russian murder victim of Tatar descent
- Damir Zlomislić (born 1991), Bosnian football player
