= 1988–89 NK Hajduk Split season =

Hajduk Split
1988–89 season
- Chairman: Kolja Marasović
- Manager: Petar Nadoveza
- First League: 3rd
- Yugoslav Cup: First round
- Top goalscorer: Branko Karačić (9)
- Highest home attendance: 30,283 v Dinamo Zagreb, 10 September 1988
- Lowest home attendance: 1,744 v Budućnost, 19 April 1989

The 1988–89 season was the 78th season in Hajduk Split’s history and their 43rd in the Yugoslav First League. Their 13th place finish in the 1987–88 season meant it was their 43rd successive season playing in the Yugoslav First League.

== Competitions ==
=== Overall ===
Competition	Started round	Final result	First match	Last Match
1988–89 Yugoslav First League	–	3rd	7 August	4 June
1988–89 Yugoslav Cup	First round		3 August	

=== Yugoslav First League ===
==== Classification ====
Pos	Team	Pld	W	PKW	PKL	L	GF	GA	GD	Pts	Qualification or relegation
1	Vojvodina (C)	34	18	5	1	10	50	38	+12	41	Qualification for European Cup first round
2	Red Star Belgrade	34	18	2	5	9	55	30	+25	38	Qualification for UEFA Cup first round
3	Hajduk Split	34	15	6	4	9	50	29	+21	36	Banned from European competition (Note: In November 1987, UEFA banned Hajduk Split from European competitions for two seasons. The immediate catalyst for the punishment was crowd trouble during the club's 1987–88 European Cup Winners' Cup second round return leg at home against Marseille on 5 November 1987. However, repeated prior incidents at Hajduk's European home matches throughout early-to-mid 1980s (such as the 1983–84 UEFA Cup semifinal first leg infamous 'rooster incident' against Tottenham Hotspur) also contributed to the decision. Since Hajduk's 1987-88 Yugoslav League performance failed to qualify the club for 1988-89 European competition, the punishment was enacted for seasons when Hajduk did manage to qualify: 1989-90 and 1990-91.)
4	Rad	34	13	9	2	10	46	38	+8	35	Qualification for UEFA Cup first round
5	Dinamo Zagreb	34	16	2	7	9	42	29	+13	34	Qualification for UEFA Cup first round

Source: rsssf.org
Rules for classification: 1) points; 2) goal difference; 3) number of goals scored.
(C) Champion

==== Results summary ====
Overall								Home						Away					
Pld	W	D	L	GF	GA	GD	Pts	W	D	L	GF	GA	GD	W	D	L	GF	GA	GD
34	15	10	9	50	29	+21	55	12	4	1	39	9	+30	3	6	8	11	20	−9

==== Results by round ====
Round	1	2	3	4	5	6	7	8	9	10	11	12	13	14	15	16	17	18	19	20	21	22	23	24	25	26	27	28	29	30	31	32	33	34
Ground	H	A	H	A	H	H	A	H	A	H	A	H	A	H	A	H	A	A	H	A	H	A	A	H	A	H	A	H	A	H	A	H	A	H
Result	W	L	D	W	W	W	D	L	L	W	W	D	D	W	D	W	D	L	D	L	W	L	L	W	L	W	D	D	L	W	D	W	W	W
Position	3	11	13	8	5	3	2	4	5	4	3	3	3	2	2	1	3	3	4	3	3	3	5	4	4	4	3	4	5	4	5	4	3	3

Source: Competitive matches
A = Away; H = Home; W = Win; D = Draw; L = Loss

== Matches ==
=== Yugoslav First League ===
Round	Date	Venue	Opponent	Score	Attendance^{1}	Hajduk Scorers
1	7 Aug	H	Čelik	2 – 0	7,944	Tošić, Pejović
2	14 Aug	A	Vojvodina	0 – 2	3,889	
3	21 Aug	H	Partizan	2 – 2 (0 – 2 p)	20,725	Karačić (2)
4	28 Aug	A	Sarajevo	1 – 0	1,835	Štimac
5	4 Sep	H	Sloboda	1 – 0	8,336	Krstović
6	10 Sep	H	Dinamo Zagreb	4 – 1	30,283	Bokšić, Karačić, Jarni, Tipurić
7	18 Sep	A	Napredak	1 – 1 (3 – 1 p)	7,709	Jarni
8	25 Sep	H	Osijek	0 – 1	7,421	
9	2 Oct	A	Budućnost	1 – 2	2,108	Karačić
10	9 Oct	H	Vardar	4 – 1	5,145	Krstović, Pejović, Tipurić, Karačić
11	23 Oct	A	Rad	1 – 0	1,549	Pejović
12	30 Oct	H	Red Star	0 – 0 (4 – 2 p)	30,051	
13	6 Nov	A	Željezničar	0 – 0 (6 – 5 p)	2,727	
14	27 Nov	H	Velež	4 – 0	8,097	Karačić (2), Tipurić, Krstović
15	4 Dec	A	Rijeka	0 – 0 (3 – 1 p)	9,570	
16	14 Dec	H	Spartak Subotica	1 – 0	6,589	Bokšić
17	18 Dec	A	Radnički Niš	0 – 0 (5 – 4 p)	2,908	
18	26 Feb	A	Čelik	0 – 1	5,161	
19	5 Mar	H	Vojvodina	0 – 0 (2 – 4 p)	11,480	
20	12 Mar	A	Partizan	0 – 1	14,347	
21	19 Mar	H	Sarajevo	3 – 1	5,347	Andrijašević (2), Krstović
22	26 Mar	A	Sloboda	1 – 3	2,371	Alar
23	2 Apr	A	Dinamo Zagreb	0 – 1	20,432	
24	9 Apr	H	Napredak Kruševac	5 – 0	3,268	Bokšić (2), Jarni, Tipurić, Karačić
25	16 Apr	A	Osijek	1 – 2	6,216	Bokšić
26	19 Apr	H	Budućnost	2 – 1	1,744	Karačić, Krstović
27	3 May	A	Vardar	1 – 1 (5 – 3 p)	5,288	Bilić
28	7 May	H	Rad	2 – 2 (4 – 5 p)	4,977	Alar, Vučević
29	14 May	A	Red Star	0 – 3	19,317	
30	21 May	H	Željezničar	2 – 0	3,443	Tipurić, Andrijašević
31	24 May	A	Velež	2 – 2 (4 – 5 p)	2,895	Bilić, Jarni
32	28 May	H	Rijeka	4 – 0	3,699	Čelić (2), Jarni, Pejović
33	31 May	A	Spartak Subotica	1 – 0	3,227	Bokšić
34	4 Jun	H	Radnički Niš	3 – 0	4,967	Jarni, Boban, Čelić

Sources: hajduk.hr

=== Yugoslav Cup ===
Round	Date	Venue	Opponent	Score	Attendance	Hajduk Scorers
R1	3 Aug	A	Liria Prizren	0 – 0 (4 – 5 p)	6,000	

Sources: hajduk.hr

== Player seasonal records ==
=== Top scorers ===
Rank	Name	Goals
1	(Socialist Federal Republic of Yugoslavia) Branko Karačić	9
2	(Socialist Federal Republic of Yugoslavia) Alen Bokšić	7
3	(Socialist Federal Republic of Yugoslavia) Robert Jarni	6
4	(Socialist Federal Republic of Yugoslavia) Radovan Krstović	4
4	(Socialist Federal Republic of Yugoslavia) Jerko Tipurić	4
6	(Socialist Federal Republic of Yugoslavia) Dragutin Čelić	3
6	(Socialist Federal Republic of Yugoslavia) Stjepan Andrijašević	3
8	(Socialist Federal Republic of Yugoslavia) Goran Alar	2
8	(Socialist Federal Republic of Yugoslavia) Slaven Bilić	2
10	(Socialist Federal Republic of Yugoslavia) Dražen Boban	1
10	(Socialist Federal Republic of Yugoslavia) Igor Štimac	1
10	(Socialist Federal Republic of Yugoslavia) Rade Tošić	1
10	(Socialist Federal Republic of Yugoslavia) Goran Vučević	1
	TOTALS	50

Source: Competitive matches

== Notes ==
1. Data for league attendance in most cases reflects the number of sold tickets and may not be indicative of the actual attendance.

== See also ==
- 1988–89 Yugoslav First League
- 1988–89 Yugoslav Cup

== External sources ==
- 1988–89 Yugoslav First League at rsssf.com
- 1988–89 Yugoslav Cup at rsssf.com
- 1988–89 Yugoslav First League at historical-lineups.com
