= 1990–91 NK Hajduk Split season =

Hajduk Split
1990–91 season
- Chairman: Stjepan Jukić Peladić
- Manager: Luka Peruzović; Josip Skoblar; Stanko Poklepović
- First League: 6th
- Yugoslav Cup: Winners
- Top goalscorer: League: Robert Jarni (8); All: Robert Jarni (12)
- Highest home attendance: 20,000 (Two matches)
- Lowest home attendance: 1,000 (Two matches)
- Average home league attendance: 4,821

The 1990–91 season was the 80th season in Hajduk Split’s history and their 45th and last in the Yugoslav First League. Their 3rd place finish in the 1989–90 season meant it was their 45th successive season playing in the Yugoslav First League.

== Competitions ==
=== Overall ===
Competition	Started round	Final result	First match	Last Match
1990–91 Yugoslav First League	–	6th	5 August	16 June
1990–91 Yugoslav Cup	First round	Winners	8 August	8 May

=== Yugoslav First League ===
==== Classification ====
Pos	Team	Pld	W	PKW	PKL	L	GF	GA	GD	Pts	Qualification or relegation
4	Proleter Zrenjanin	36	17	1	3	15	50	49	+1	35	Qualification for Intertoto Cup
5	Borac Banja Luka	36	14	7	4	11	42	38	+4	35	
6	Hajduk Split (Note: After the season, Croatian and Slovenian clubs left the Yugoslav federation and formed their own leagues. Dinamo Zagreb, Hajduk Split, Osijek and Rijeka joined 1992 Prva HNL, while Olimpija joined 1991–92 Slovenian PrvaLiga.)	36	15	3	6	12	49	38	+11	33	Qualification for Cup Winners' Cup first round and Prva HNL
7	Vojvodina	36	14	5	4	13	47	52	−5	33	
8	Rad	36	14	4	3	15	42	34	+8	32	

Source: rsssf.org
Rules for classification: 1) points; 2) goal difference; 3) number of goals scored.

==== Results summary ====
Overall								Home						Away					
Pld	W	D	L	GF	GA	GD	Pts	W	D	L	GF	GA	GD	W	D	L	GF	GA	GD
36	15	9	12	49	38	+11	54	10	6	2	31	14	+17	5	3	10	18	24	−6

==== Results by round ====
Round	1	2	3	4	5	6	7	8	9	10	11	12	13	14	15	16	17	18	19	20	21	22	23	24	25	26	27	28	29	30	31	32	33	34	35	36	37	38
Ground	A	H	A	A	A	H	A	H	A	B	A	H	A	A	H	A	H	A	H	H	A	H	H	H	A	H	B	A	H	H	A	H	H	A	H	A	H	A
Result	L	D	L	L	L	D	W	L	L	X	D	W	D	W	W	L	D	L	W	W	L	W	W	D	D	D	X	L	W	L	W	W	D	W	W	L	W	W
Position	15	13	15	17	19	19	15	16	17	19	19	18	18	17	17	17	18	18	18	17	17	16	14	12	11	15	16	13	15	16	15	13	14	12	8	12	8	6

Source: Competitive matches
A = Away; H = Home; B = Bye; W = Win; D = Draw; L = Loss; X = Bye

== Matches ==
=== Yugoslav First League ===
Round	Date	Venue	Opponent	Score	Attendance	Hajduk Scorers	Report
1	5 Aug	A	Radnički Niš	0 – 1	8,000		HRnogomet.com
2	12 Aug	H	Željezničar	1 – 1 (4 – 2 p)	5,000	Vučević	HRnogomet.com
3	19 Aug	A	Olimpija	1 – 2	8,000	Miše	HRnogomet.com
4	26 Aug	A	Budućnost	0 – 1	6,000		HRnogomet.com
5	1 Sep	A	Velež	3 – 4	10,000	Bokšić (2), Setinov	HRnogomet.com
6	16 Sep	H	Rijeka	1 – 1 (5 – 6 p)	5,000	Bokšić	HRnogomet.com
7	23 Sep	A	Borac Banja Luka	2 – 0	8,000	Kozniku, Čelić	HRnogomet.com
8	26 Sep	H	Partizan	0 – 3 (0 – 2)^{1}	20,000		HRnogomet.com
9	29 Sep	A	Zemun	0 – 1	4,000		HRnogomet.com
11	13 Oct	A	Dinamo Zagreb	1 – 1 (3 – 4 p)	15,000	Štimac	HRnogomet.com
12	21 Oct	HR	Osijek	3 – 0	6,000	Dražić (2), Jarni	HRnogomet.com
13	4 Nov	A	Sarajevo	1 – 1 (2 – 4 p)	5,000	Vučević	HRnogomet.com
14	18 Nov	A	Vojvodina	2 – 0	4,000	Jarni, Kartalija (o.g.)	HRnogomet.com
15	24 Nov	HR	Spartak Subotica	3 – 0	2,000	Bokšić, Čelić, Štimac	HRnogomet.com
16	2 Dec	A	Sloboda	1 – 2	1,000	Dražić	HRnogomet.com
18	9 Dec	A	Rad	0 – 1	500		HRnogomet.com
19	15 Dec	HR	Proleter Zrenjanin	3 – 0	1,000	Jeličić, Bokšić, Jarni	HRnogomet.com
17	19 Dec	H	Red Star	1 – 1 (3 – 5 p)	20,000	Jeličić	HRnogomet.com
20	17 Feb	H	Radnički Niš	3 – 0	3,000	Jarni (2), Jeličić	HRnogomet.com
22	3 Mar	H	Olimpija	2 – 0	4,000	Jarni, Čerkić	HRnogomet.com
21	6 Mar	A	Željezničar	2 – 3	5,000	Jeličić, Kozniku	HRnogomet.com
23	10 Mar	H	Budućnost	1 – 0	3,000	Jarni	HRnogomet.com
24	17 Mar	H	Velež	1 – 1 (3 – 1 p)	5,000	Osibov	HRnogomet.com
25	23 Mar	A	Rijeka	0 – 0 (3 – 1 p)	7,000		HRnogomet.com
26	31 Mar	H	Borac Banja Luka	1 – 1 (3 – 4 p)	1,500	Jeličić	HRnogomet.com
27	7 Apr	A	Partizan	0 – 4	10,000		HRnogomet.com
28	13 Apr	H	Zemun	2 – 1	1,000	Bokšić, Kozniku	HRnogomet.com
30	27 Apr	H	Dinamo Zagreb	1 – 2	12,000	Vučević	HRnogomet.com
32	11 May	H	Sarajevo	2 – 1	2,000	Anić, Jarni	HRnogomet.com
33	19 May	H	Vojvodina	1 – 1 (2 – 4 p)	2,000	Bilić	HRnogomet.com
34	26 May	A	Spartak Subotica	1 – 0	1,000	Jeslínek	HRnogomet.com
31	29 May	A	Osijek	1 – 0	3,000	Bilić	HRnogomet.com
35	2 Jun	H	Sloboda	1 – 0	2,000	Jeličić	HRnogomet.com
36	5 Jun	A	Red Star	0 – 1	45,000		HRnogomet.com
37	9 Jun	H	Rad	4 – 2	2,000	Kozniku (2), Abazi, Jeličić	HRnogomet.com
38	16 Jun	A	Proleter Zrenjanin	3 – 2	4,000	Kozniku, Lalić, Mornar	HRnogomet.com

Sources: hajduk.hr

=== Yugoslav Cup ===
Round	Date	Venue	Opponent	Score	Attendance	Hajduk Scorers	Report
R1	8 Aug	AR	Vrapče	6 – 0	5,000	Vicković (o.g.), Jarni (3), Kozniku, Miše	HRnogomet.com
R2	15 Aug	H	Pelister	1 – 1	1,000	Kovač	HRnogomet.com
R2	23 Aug	A	Pelister	2 – 2	8,000	Kozniku, Štimac	HRnogomet.com
QF	10 Oct	A	Rijeka	1 – 0	3,000	Jarni	HRnogomet.com
QF	21 Nov	HR	Rijeka	1 – 1	4,000	Vučević	HRnogomet.com
SF	3 Apr	H	Borac Banja Luka	1 – 0	3,000	Štimac	HRnogomet.com
SF	17 Apr	A	Borac Banja Luka	1 – 0	10,000	Bokšić	HRnogomet.com
Final	8 May	N	Red Star	1 – 0	6,000	Bokšić	HRnogomet.com

Sources: hajduk.hr

== Player seasonal records ==
=== Top scorers ===
Rank	Name	League	Cup	Total
1	(Socialist Federal Republic of Yugoslavia) Robert Jarni	8	4	12
2	(Socialist Federal Republic of Yugoslavia) Alen Bokšić	6	2	8
2	(Socialist Federal Republic of Yugoslavia) Ardian Kozniku	6	2	8
4	(Socialist Federal Republic of Yugoslavia) Joško Jeličić	7	–	7
5	(Socialist Federal Republic of Yugoslavia) Igor Štimac	2	2	4
5	(Socialist Federal Republic of Yugoslavia) Goran Vučević	3	1	4
7	(Socialist Federal Republic of Yugoslavia) Darko Dražić	3	–	3
8	(Socialist Federal Republic of Yugoslavia) Slaven Bilić	2	–	2
8	(Socialist Federal Republic of Yugoslavia) Dragutin Čelić	2	–	2
8	(Socialist Federal Republic of Yugoslavia) Ante Miše	1	1	2
10	(Albania) Edmond Abazi	1	–	1
10	(Socialist Federal Republic of Yugoslavia) Boško Anić	1	–	1
10	(Socialist Federal Republic of Yugoslavia) Damir Čerkić	1	–	1
10	(Czechoslovakia) Jiří Jeslínek	1	–	1
10	(Socialist Federal Republic of Yugoslavia) Grgica Kovač	–	1	1
10	(Socialist Federal Republic of Yugoslavia) Marin Lalić	1	–	1
10	(Socialist Federal Republic of Yugoslavia) Ivica Mornar	1	–	1
10	(Socialist Federal Republic of Yugoslavia) Mario Osibov	1	–	1
10	(Socialist Federal Republic of Yugoslavia) Dragi Setinov	1	–	1
	Own goals	1	1	2
	TOTALS	49	14	63

Source: Competitive matches

== Notes ==
1. Match abandoned due to crowd trouble. Therefore, the match was awarded to Partizan.

== See also ==
- 1990–91 Yugoslav First League
- 1990–91 Yugoslav Cup

== External sources ==
- 1990–91 Yugoslav First League at rsssf.com
- 1990–91 Yugoslav Cup at rsssf.com
- 1990–91 Yugoslav First League at historical-lineups.com
