= 1989–90 NK Hajduk Split season =

Hajduk Split
1989–90 season
- Chairman: Kolja Marasović
- Manager: Petar Nadoveza; Luka Peruzović
- First League: 3rd
- Yugoslav Cup: Runners-up
- Top goalscorer: League: Aljoša Asanović (14); All: Aljoša Asanović (16)
- Highest home attendance: 41,809 v Dinamo Zagreb, 18 March 1990
- Lowest home attendance: 0 v Sarajevo, 18 February 1990

The 1989–90 season was the 79th season in Hajduk Split’s history and their 44th in the Yugoslav First League. Their 3rd place finish in the 1988–89 season meant it was their 44th successive season playing in the Yugoslav First League.

== Competitions ==
=== Overall ===
| Competition | Started round | Final result | First match | Last Match |
|---|---|---|---|---|
| 1989–90 Yugoslav First League | – | 3rd | 30 July | 16 May |
| 1989–90 Yugoslav Cup | First round | Runners-up | 2 August | 19 May |

=== Yugoslav First League ===
==== Classification ====
| Pos | Team | Pld | W | PKW | PKL | L | GF | GA | GD | Pts | Qualification or relegation |
|---|---|---|---|---|---|---|---|---|---|---|---|
| 1 | Red Star Belgrade (C) | 34 | 24 | 3 | 2 | 5 | 79 | 29 | +50 | 51 | Qualification for European Cup first round |
| 2 | Dinamo Zagreb | 34 | 16 | 8 | 3 | 7 | 53 | 25 | +28 | 40 | Qualification for UEFA Cup first round |
| 3 | Hajduk Split | 34 | 18 | 2 | 1 | 13 | 50 | 35 | +15 | 38 | Banned from European competition (Note: In November 1987, UEFA banned Hajduk Split from European competitions for two seasons. The immediate catalyst for the punishment was crowd trouble during club's 1987–88 European Cup Winners' Cup match against Marseille on 5 November 1987, however, repeated prior incidents at Hajduk's European home matches throughout early-to-mid 1980s (such as the 1983–84 UEFA Cup semifinal first leg infamous 'rooster incident' against Tottenham Hotspur) also contributed to the decision. Since Hajduk's 1987–88 Yugoslav League performance failed to qualify the club for 1988–89 European competition, the punishment was enacted for seasons when Hajduk did manage to qualify: 1989–90 and 1990–91.) |
| 4 | Partizan | 34 | 18 | 1 | 3 | 12 | 51 | 42 | +9 | 37 | Qualification for UEFA Cup first round |
| 5 | Rad | 34 | 16 | 4 | 2 | 12 | 41 | 31 | +10 | 36 | |

Source: rsssf.org
Rules for classification: 1) points; 2) goal difference; 3) number of goals scored.
(C) Champion

==== Results summary ====
| Overall | | | | | | | | Home | | | | | | Away | | | | | |
| Pld | W | D | L | GF | GA | GD | Pts | W | D | L | GF | GA | GD | W | D | L | GF | GA | GD |
|---|---|---|---|---|---|---|---|---|---|---|---|---|---|---|---|---|---|---|---|
| 34 | 18 | 3 | 13 | 50 | 35 | +15 | 57 | 14 | 2 | 1 | 37 | 10 | +27 | 4 | 1 | 12 | 13 | 25 | −12 |

==== Results by round ====
| Round | 1 | 2 | 3 | 4 | 5 | 6 | 7 | 8 | 9 | 10 | 11 | 12 | 13 | 14 | 15 | 16 | 17 | 18 | 19 | 20 | 21 | 22 | 23 | 24 | 25 | 26 | 27 | 28 | 29 | 30 | 31 | 32 | 33 | 34 |
|---|---|---|---|---|---|---|---|---|---|---|---|---|---|---|---|---|---|---|---|---|---|---|---|---|---|---|---|---|---|---|---|---|---|---|
| Ground | A | H | A | H | A | H | A | H | A | H | A | H | A | A | H | A | H | H | A | H | A | H | A | H | A | H | A | H | A | H | H | A | H | A |
| Result | L | W | L | W | L | W | L | W | D | W | W | W | L | L | W | L | W | D | L | D | W | W | L | L | L | W | W | W | W | W | W | L | W | L |
| Position | 11 | 8 | 10 | 9 | 11 | 9 | 13 | 7 | 7 | 4 | 4 | 2 | 3 | 3 | 3 | 3 | 3 | 3 | 4 | 4 | 3 | 3 | 4 | 4 | 4 | 3 | 3 | 3 | 3 | 3 | 3 | 3 | 3 | 3 |

Source: Competitive matches
A = Away; H = Home; W = Win; D = Draw; L = Loss

== Matches ==
=== Yugoslav First League ===
| Round | Date | Venue | Opponent | Score | Attendance^{1} | Hajduk Scorers |
|---|---|---|---|---|---|---|
| 1 | 30 Jul | A | Rijeka | 0 – 1 | 6,277 | |
| 2 | 6 Aug | H | Budućnost | 2 – 0 | 8,295 | Barnjak, Andrijašević |
| 3 | 13 Aug | A | Sarajevo | 0 – 1 | 2,910 | |
| 4 | 20 Aug | H | Rad | 2 – 1 | 5,918 | Asanović, Bokšić |
| 5 | 27 Aug | A | Olimpija | 1 – 3 | 8,645 | Asanović |
| 6 | 9 Sep | H | Red Star | 2 – 1 | 28,196 | Čelić, Bokšić |
| 7 | 17 Sep | A | Dinamo Zagreb | 0 – 2 | 40,341 | |
| 8 | 24 Sep | H | Spartak Subotica | 3 – 0 | 5,660 | Gračan, Asanović, Bilić |
| 9 | 1 Oct | A | Sloboda | 2 – 2 (6 – 5 p) | 2,268 | Jarni, Vučević |
| 10 | 7 Oct | H | Vojvodina | 6 – 0 | 4,034 | Barnjak (2), Čelić, Asanović, Vučević, Bokšić |
| 11 | 15 Oct | A | Vardar | 2 – 1 | 4,904 | Bokšić, Barnjak |
| 12 | 22 Oct | H | Željezničar | 2 – 0 | 10,865 | Bokšić (2) |
| 13 | 5 Nov | A | Osijek | 0 – 1 | 6,351 | |
| 14 | 12 Nov | A | Velež | 0 – 1 | 6,711 | |
| 15 | 19 Nov | H | Partizan | 2 – 0 | 20,418 | Bokšić, Jeličić |
| 16 | 26 Nov | A | Radnički Niš | 1 – 5 | 2,022 | Bilić |
| 17 | 3 Dec | H | Borac Banja Luka | 1 – 0 | 3,042 | Asanović |
| 18 | 10 Dec | H | Rijeka | 1 – 1 (5 – 6 p) | 3,321 | Vučević |
| 19 | 17 Dec | A | Budućnost | 0 – 1 | 2,755 | |
| 20 | 18 Feb | H | Sarajevo | 0 – 0 (4 – 3 p) | 0 | |
| 21 | 25 Feb | A | Rad | 2 – 0 | 2,597 | Asanović, Bokšić |
| 22 | 4 Mar | H | Olimpija | 3 – 1 | 3,725 | Asanović, Čelić, Jarni |
| 23 | 11 Mar | A | Red Star | 1 – 2 | 33,209 | Asanović |
| 24 | 18 Mar | H | Dinamo Zagreb | 2 – 3 | 41,809 | Vučević, Asanović |
| 25 | 25 Mar | A | Spartak Subotica | 0 – 1 | 4,485 | |
| 26 | 1 Apr | H | Sloboda | 2 – 0 | 3,060 | Jeličić, Bokšić |
| 27 | 8 Apr | A | Vojvodina | 3 – 2 | 2,337 | Asanović (2), Bokšić |
| 28 | 15 Apr | H | Vardar | 3 – 0 | 2,659 | Kovač, Jerkan, Bokšić |
| 29 | 22 Apr | A | Željezničar | 1 – 0 | 6,231 | Asanović |
| 30 | 25 Apr | H | Osijek | 1 – 0 | 3,000 | Asanović |
| 31 | 29 Apr | H | Velež | 4 – 3 | 3,000 | Bilić, Asanović, Čelić, Bokšić |
| 32 | 6 May | A | Partizan | 0 – 1 | 7,074 | |
| 33 | 13 May | H | Radnički Niš | 1 – 0 | 2,390 | Čelić |
| 34 | 16 May | A | Borac Banja Luka | 0 – 1 | 6,000 | |

Sources: hajduk.hr

=== Yugoslav Cup ===
| Round | Date | Venue | Opponent | Score | Attendance | Hajduk Scorers |
|---|---|---|---|---|---|---|
| R1 | 2 Aug | A | Vrbas | 3 – 0 | 5,000 | Asanović, Čelić, Mihić |
| R2 | 9 Aug | H | Rad | 0 – 0 | 5,000 | |
| R2 | 16 Aug | A | Rad | 0 – 0 (7 – 6 p) | 5,000 | |
| QF | 25 Oct | A | Vardar | 4 – 0 | 10,000 | Čelić, Vučević, Bokšić, Bilić |
| QF | 8 Nov | H | Vardar | 1 – 1 | 3,000 | Jeličić |
| SF | 18 Apr | A | Osijek | 3 – 0 | 4,000 | Vučević, Asanović, Kovač |
| SF | 2 May | H | Osijek | 5 – 2 | | Mihić (2), Čelić, Barnjak, Jeličić |
| Final | 19 May | N | Red Star | 0 – 1 | 23,733 | |

Sources: hajduk.hr

== Player seasonal records ==
=== Top scorers ===
| Rank | Name | League | Cup | Total |
|---|---|---|---|---|
| 1 | (Socialist Federal Republic of Yugoslavia) Aljoša Asanović | 14 | 2 | 16 |
| 2 | (Socialist Federal Republic of Yugoslavia) Alen Bokšić | 12 | 1 | 13 |
| 3 | (Socialist Federal Republic of Yugoslavia) Dragutin Čelić | 5 | 3 | 8 |
| 4 | (Socialist Federal Republic of Yugoslavia) Goran Vučević | 4 | 2 | 6 |
| 5 | (Socialist Federal Republic of Yugoslavia) Bernard Barnjak | 4 | 1 | 5 |
| 6 | (Socialist Federal Republic of Yugoslavia) Slaven Bilić | 3 | 1 | 4 |
| 6 | (Socialist Federal Republic of Yugoslavia) Joško Jeličić | 2 | 2 | 4 |
| 8 | (Socialist Federal Republic of Yugoslavia) Robert Jarni | 2 | – | 3 |
| 8 | (Socialist Federal Republic of Yugoslavia) Mirko Mihić | – | 3 | 3 |
| 10 | (Socialist Federal Republic of Yugoslavia) Grgica Kovač | 1 | 1 | 2 |
| 11 | (Socialist Federal Republic of Yugoslavia) Stjepan Andrijašević | 1 | – | 1 |
| 11 | (Socialist Federal Republic of Yugoslavia) Nenad Gračan | 1 | – | 1 |
| 11 | (Socialist Federal Republic of Yugoslavia) Nikola Jerkan | 1 | – | 1 |
| | TOTALS | 50 | 16 | 66 |

Source: Competitive matches

== Notes ==
1. Data for league attendance in most cases reflects the number of sold tickets and may not be indicative of the actual attendance.

== See also ==
- 1989–90 Yugoslav First League
- 1989–90 Yugoslav Cup

== External sources ==
- 1989–90 Yugoslav First League at rsssf.com
- 1989–90 Yugoslav Cup at rsssf.com
- 1989–90 Yugoslav First League at historical-lineups.com
