= 1986–87 NK Hajduk Split season =

Hajduk Split
1986–87 season
- Chairman: Joško Vidošević; Vlado Bučević
- Manager: Sergije Krešić; Josip Skoblar
- First League: 8th
- Yugoslav Cup: Winners
- UEFA Cup: Third round
- Top goalscorer: League: Stjepan Deverić (10); All: Stjepan Deverić (21)
- Highest home attendance: 35,000 v Red Star, 13 September 1986, 11 March 1987
- Lowest home attendance: 3,000 (Two matches)

The 1986–87 season was the 76th season in Hajduk Split’s history and their 41st in the Yugoslav First League. Their 4th place finish in the 1985–86 season meant it was their 41st successive season playing in the Yugoslav First League.

== Competitions ==
=== Overall ===
Competition	Started round	Final result	First match	Last Match
1986–87 Yugoslav First League	–	4th	11 August	14 June
1986–87 Yugoslav Cup	First round	Winners	13 August	9 May
1986–87 UEFA Cup	First round	Third round	18 September	19 March

=== Yugoslav First League ===
==== Classification ====
Pos	Team	Pld	W	D	L	GF	GA	GD	Pts	Qualification or relegation
6	Dinamo Zagreb	34	14	9	11	49	43	+6	37	
7	Budućnost	34	14	9	11	40	36	+4	37	
8	Hajduk Split	34	14	8	12	41	41	0	36	Qualification for Cup Winners' Cup first round
9	Željezničar	34	14	6	14	55	46	+9	34	
10	Sutjeska Nikšić	34	12	10	12	50	52	−2	34	

Source: rsssf.org
Rules for classification: 1) points; 2) goal difference; 3) number of goals scored.

==== Results summary ====
Overall								Home						Away					
Pld	W	D	L	GF	GA	GD	Pts	W	D	L	GF	GA	GD	W	D	L	GF	GA	GD
34	14	8	12	41	41	0	50	10	3	4	23	16	+7	4	5	8	18	25	−7

==== Results by round ====
Round	1	2	3	4	5	6	7	8	9	10	11	12	13	14	15	16	17	18	19	20	21	22	23	24	25	26	27	28	29	30	31	32	33	34
Ground	A	H	A	H	A	H	A	H	A	A	H	A	H	A	H	A	H	H	A	H	A	H	A	H	A	H	H	A	H	A	H	A	H	A
Result	D	L	W	W	D	D	L	D	L	W	D	D	W	L	L	L	W	W	D	W	W	W	L	W	L	W	W	W	L	L	W	D	L	L
Position	8	16	12	9	9	9	10	9	11	10	11	8	8	10	11	12	10	9	9	8	8	7	9	7	7	7	6	5	6	8	7	6	6	8

Source: Competitive matches
A = Away; H = Home; W = Win; D = Draw; L = Loss

== Matches ==
=== Yugoslav First League ===
Round	Date	Venue	Opponent	Score	Attendance	Hajduk Scorers
1	10 Aug	A	Rijeka	2 – 2	20,000	Gračan, Deverić
2	17 Aug	H	Dinamo Zagreb	0 – 4	40,000	
3	24 Aug	A	Željezničar	1 – 0	20,000	Deverić
4	31 Aug	H	Osijek	2 – 0	7,000	Adamović, Andrijašević
5	7 Sep	A	Prishtina	1 – 1	20,000	Adamović
6	13 Sep	H	Red Star	1 – 1	35,000	Bursać
7	20 Sep	A	Sutjeska	2 – 3	3,000	Bursać, Deverić
8	28 Sep	H	Vardar	0 – 0	10,000	
9	5 Oct	A	Radnički Niš	0 – 2	15,000	
10	12 Oct	A	Spartak Subotica	1 – 0	12,000	Asanović
11	18 Oct	H	Velež	1 – 1	25,000	Asanović
12	1 Nov	A	Sarajevo	2 – 2	5,000	Andrijašević, Adamović
13	16 Nov	H	Dinamo Vinkovci	2 – 0	6,000	Jerolimov (2)
14	22 Nov	A	Partizan	1 – 4	25,000	Deverić
15	30 Nov	H	Budućnost	1 – 2	8,000	Vulić
16	6 Dec	A	Sloboda	0 – 1	6,000	
17	14 Dec	H	Čelik	2 – 0	4,000	Čelić, Deverić
18	22 Feb	H	Rijeka	2 – 0	15,000	Deverić, Bućan
19	1 Mar	A	Dinamo Zagreb	3 – 3	50,000	Deverić, Vulić, Asanović
20	8 Mar	H	Željezničar	1 – 0	10,000	Jerolimov
21	15 Mar	A	Osijek	2 – 0	15,000	Deverić, Miljuš
22	22 Mar	H	Prishtina	1 – 0	10,000	Deverić
23	29 Mar	A	Red Star	1 – 2	25,000	Bursać
24	5 Apr	H	Sutjeska	2 – 1	15,000	Bursać, Asanović
25	12 Apr	A	Vardar	0 – 1	30,000	
26	15 Apr	H	Radnički Niš	3 – 2	10,000	Bućan (2), Bursać
27	19 Apr	H	Spartak Subotica	2 – 1	8,000	Bursać, Asanović
28	3 May	A	Velež	1 – 0	20,000	Deverić
29	13 May	H	Sarajevo	1 – 2	30,000	Asanović
30	17 May	A	Dinamo Vinkovci	0 – 1	10,000	
31	24 May	H	Partizan	2 – 1	30,000	Setinov, Vulić
32	31 May	A	Budućnost	0 – 0	10,000	
33	7 Jun	H	Sloboda	0 – 1	15,000	
34	14 Jun	A	Čelik	1 – 3	15,000	Tipurić

Sources: hajduk.hr

=== Yugoslav Cup ===
Round	Date	Venue	Opponent	Score	Attendance	Hajduk Scorers
R1	13 Aug	A	Tekstilac Bijelo Polje	7 – 0		Deverić (2), Gudelj (2), Weber (2), Čelić
R2	27 Aug	H	Budućnost Banovići	4 – 1	3,000	Deverić (2), Lugavić (o.g.), Weber
R2	9 Sep	A	Budućnost Banovići	1 – 2	5,000	Deverić
QF	8 Oct	H	Spartak Subotica	3 – 2	3,000	Deverić (2), Andrijašević
QF	19 Nov	A	Spartak Subotica	2 – 1		Vulić (2)
SF	11 Mar	H	Red Star	1 – 2	35,000	Deverić
SF	1 Apr	A	Red Star	1 – 0 (5 – 4 p)	30,000	Asanović
Final	9 May	N	Rijeka	1 – 1 (9 – 8 p)	30,000	Asanović

Sources: hajduk.hr

=== UEFA Cup ===
Round	Date	Venue	Opponent	Score	Attendance	Hajduk Scorers
R1	17 Sep	A (Greece)	OFI (Greece)	0 – 1	5,187	
R1	1 Oct	H	OFI (Greece)	4 – 0	15,000	Jerolimov, Bursać (2), Deverić
R2	22 Oct	H	Trakia Plovdiv (Bulgaria)	3 – 1	17,000	Jerolimov, Bursać, Deverić
R2	5 Nov	A (Bulgaria)	Trakia Plovdiv (Bulgaria)	2 – 2	15,000	Deverić, Bursać
R3	26 Nov	A (Scotland)	Dundee United (Scotland)	0 – 2	11,569	
R3	10 Dec	H	Dundee United (Scotland)	0 – 0	26,000	

Source: hajduk.hr

== Player seasonal records ==
=== Top scorers ===
Rank	Name	League	Europe	Cup	Total
1	(Socialist Federal Republic of Yugoslavia) Stjepan Deverić	10	3	8	21
2	(Socialist Federal Republic of Yugoslavia) Miloš Bursać	6	4	–	10
3	(Socialist Federal Republic of Yugoslavia) Aljoša Asanović	6	–	2	8
4	(Socialist Federal Republic of Yugoslavia) Ive Jerolimov	3	2	–	5
4	(Socialist Federal Republic of Yugoslavia) Zoran Vulić	3	2	–	5
6	(Socialist Federal Republic of Yugoslavia) Zdenko Adamović	3	–	–	3
6	(Socialist Federal Republic of Yugoslavia) Stjepan Andrijašević	2	–	1	3
6	(Socialist Federal Republic of Yugoslavia) Frane Bućan	3	–	–	3
6	(Socialist Federal Republic of Yugoslavia) Josip Weber	–	–	3	3
10	(Socialist Federal Republic of Yugoslavia) Dragutin Čelić	1	–	1	2
10	(Socialist Federal Republic of Yugoslavia) Ivan Gudelj	–	–	2	2
12	(Socialist Federal Republic of Yugoslavia) Nenad Gračan	1	–	–	1
12	(Socialist Federal Republic of Yugoslavia) Branko Miljuš	1	–	–	1
12	(Socialist Federal Republic of Yugoslavia) Dragi Setinov	1	–	–	1
12	(Socialist Federal Republic of Yugoslavia) Jerko Tipurić	1	–	–	1
	Own goals	–	–	1	1
	TOTALS	41	9	20	70

Source: Competitive matches

== See also ==
- 1986–87 Yugoslav First League
- 1986–87 Yugoslav Cup

== External sources ==
- 1986–87 Yugoslav First League at rsssf.com
- 1986–87 Yugoslav Cup at rsssf.com
- 1986–87 UEFA Cup at rsssf.com
- 1986–87 Yugoslav First League at historical-lineups.com
