= 1989–90 Yugoslav Cup =

Football competition in SFR Yugoslavia

1989–90 Yugoslav Football Cup
42nd Marshal Tito Cup

Tournament details
- Country: Yugoslavia
- Teams: 5,378 (preliminaries); 32 (final rounds)

Final positions
- Champions: Red Star Belgrade (12th title)
- Runners-up: Hajduk Split

Tournament statistics
- Matches played: 45
- Goals scored: 129 (2.87 per match)

The 1989–90 Yugoslav Cup was the 42nd season of the top football knockout competition in SFR Yugoslavia, the Yugoslav Cup (Serbo-Croatian: Kup Jugoslavije), also known as the "Marshal Tito Cup" (Kup Maršala Tita), since its establishment in 1946. In total, 5,378 clubs across SFR Yugoslavia took part in the competition.

== First round ==
In the following tables winning teams are marked in bold; teams from outside top level are marked in italic script.

Tie no	Home team	Score	Away team
1	Bačka Bačka Palanka	0–4	**Rad**
2	Čelik	0–0 (2–4 p)	**Vojvodina**
3	**Dinamo Zagreb**	3–0	Napredak Kruševac
4^{†}	Guber Srebrenica	1–2	**Budućnost Titograd**
5	**Jugokeramika Zaprešić**	2–0	Radnički Niš
6	Maribor	0–1	**Spartak Subotica**
7	OFK Belgrade	1–2	**Vardar**
8	NK Orijent	0–1	**Rijeka**
9	**Red Star**	8–2	Liria Prizren
10	**Sarajevo**	2–0	Sloboda Titovo Užice
11	Selekcija JNA	2–5	**Partizan**
12	**Sileks Kratovo**	2–1	Željezničar Sarajevo
13	**Sloboda Tuzla**	3–2	Dinamo Vinkovci
14	**Velež**	3–1	Borac Čačak
15	Vratnik Sarajevo	0–1	**Osijek**
16	Vrbas	0–3	**Hajduk Split**

^{†} Match was replayed after the previous one was declared void. In the first match, Guber Srebrenica won on penalties 3–2 after 1–1 in extra time.

== Second round ==
Tie no	Team 1	Agg.	Team 2	1st leg	2nd leg
1	Hajduk Split	0–0 (7–6 p)	Rad	0–0	0–0
2	Jugokeramika Zaprešić	1–2	Osijek	1–0	0–2
3	Partizan	4–2	Dinamo Zagreb	3–2	1–0
4	Red Star	7–1	Vojvodina	6–0	1–1
5	Sileks Kratovo	1–1 (5–3 p)	Sarajevo	1–0	0–1
6	Sloboda Tuzla	2–3	Budućnost Titograd	2–0	0–3
7	Spartak Subotica	0–1	Velež	0–0	0–1
8	Vardar	5–3	Rijeka	3–0	2–3

== Quarter-finals ==
Tie no	Team 1	Agg.	Team 2	1st leg	2nd leg
1	Red Star	8–1	Budućnost Titograd	5–1	3–0
2	Sileks Kratovo	2–5	Osijek	1–1	1–4
3	Vardar	1–5	Hajduk Split	0–4	1–1
4	Velež	2–3	Partizan	1–2	1–1

== Semi-finals ==
Tie no	Team 1	Agg.	Team 2	1st leg	2nd leg
1	Osijek	2–8	Hajduk Split	0–3	2–5
2	Red Star	4–2	Partizan	1–0	3–2

== Final ==
19 May 1990
18:00 CET

Red Star	1–0	Hajduk Split
Pančev 12'

Stadion JNA, Belgrade
Attendance: 23,733
Referee: Goce Popev (Skopje)

RED STAR:
GK	1	(Socialist Federal Republic of Yugoslavia) Stevan Stojanović
DF	2	(Socialist Federal Republic of Yugoslavia) Goran Jurić
DF	3	(Socialist Federal Republic of Yugoslavia) Slobodan Marović
MF	4	(Socialist Federal Republic of Yugoslavia) Vlada Stošić
DF	5	(Romania) Miodrag Belodedici
DF	6	(Socialist Federal Republic of Yugoslavia) Ilija Najdoski
MF	7	(Socialist Federal Republic of Yugoslavia) Robert Prosinečki
FW	8	(Socialist Federal Republic of Yugoslavia) Dejan Savićević
FW	9	(Socialist Federal Republic of Yugoslavia) Darko Pančev
MF	10	(Socialist Federal Republic of Yugoslavia) Dragan Stojković
DF	11	(Socialist Federal Republic of Yugoslavia) Refik Šabanadžović
Substitutes:
GK	12	(Socialist Federal Republic of Yugoslavia) Marko Simeunović
DF	13	(Socialist Federal Republic of Yugoslavia) Duško Radinović
MF	14	(Socialist Federal Republic of Yugoslavia) Dragan Kanatlarovski
FW	15	(Socialist Federal Republic of Yugoslavia) Vladan Lukić
FW	16	(Socialist Federal Republic of Yugoslavia) Mitar Mrkela
Manager:
(Socialist Federal Republic of Yugoslavia) Dragoslav Šekularac

HAJDUK SPLIT:
GK	1	(Socialist Federal Republic of Yugoslavia) Ivan Pudar
DF	2	(Socialist Federal Republic of Yugoslavia) Mili Hadžiabdić
DF	3	(Socialist Federal Republic of Yugoslavia) Darko Dražić
DF	4	(Socialist Federal Republic of Yugoslavia) Slaven Bilić
DF	5	(Socialist Federal Republic of Yugoslavia) Nikola Jerkan
DF	6	(Socialist Federal Republic of Yugoslavia) Igor Štimac	(substituted off) 55'
MF	7	(Socialist Federal Republic of Yugoslavia) Joško Jeličić	(substituted off) 81'
MF	8	(Socialist Federal Republic of Yugoslavia) Dragutin Čelić
MF	9	(Socialist Federal Republic of Yugoslavia) Robert Jarni
MF	10	(Socialist Federal Republic of Yugoslavia) Aljoša Asanović
FW	11	(Socialist Federal Republic of Yugoslavia) Alen Bokšić
Substitutes:
GK	12	(Socialist Federal Republic of Yugoslavia) Mladen Pralija
DF	13	(Socialist Federal Republic of Yugoslavia) Grgica Kovač
MF	14	(Socialist Federal Republic of Yugoslavia) Goran Vučević	(substituted on) 55'
DF	15	(Socialist Federal Republic of Yugoslavia) Damir Jurković
FW	16	(Socialist Federal Republic of Yugoslavia) Bernard Barnjak	(substituted on) 81'
Manager:
(Socialist Federal Republic of Yugoslavia) Luka Peruzović

== See also ==
- 1989–90 Yugoslav First League
- 1989–90 Yugoslav Second League
