= 1987–88 NK Hajduk Split season =

Hajduk Split
1987–88 season
- Chairman: Vlado Bučević; Kolja Marasović
- Manager: Marin Kovačić; Ivan Vutsov; Luka Peruzović
- First League: 13th
- Yugoslav Cup: Second round
- Cup Winners' Cup: Second round
- Top goalscorer: League: Miloš Bursać (10); All: Miloš Bursać (11)
- Highest home attendance: 23,129 v Dinamo Zagreb, 27 September 1987
- Lowest home attendance: 2,000 v Čelik, 29 November 1987

The 1987–88 season was the 77th season in Hajduk Split’s history and their 42nd in the Yugoslav First League. Their 7th place finish in the 1986–87 season meant it was their 42nd successive season playing in the Yugoslav First League.

== Competitions ==
=== Overall ===
Competition	Started round	Final result	First match	Last Match
1987–88 Yugoslav First League	–	13th	2 August	12 June
1987–88 Yugoslav Cup	First round	Second round	12 August	12 November
1987–88 European Cup Winners' Cup	First round	Second round	16 September	5 November

=== Yugoslav First League ===
==== Classification ====
Pos	Team	Pld	W	D	L	GF	GA	GD	Pts	Qualification or relegation
11	Osijek	34	10	11	13	44	61	−17	31	
12	Željezničar	34	8	14	12	38	44	−6	30	
13	Hajduk Split	34	8	14	12	40	50	−10	30	
14	Sarajevo	34	11	8	15	37	47	−10	30	
15	Rad	34	11	8	15	44	56	−12	30	Qualification for Intertoto Cup

Source: rsssf.org
Rules for classification: 1) points; 2) goal difference; 3) number of goals scored.

==== Results summary ====
Overall								Home						Away					
Pld	W	D	L	GF	GA	GD	Pts	W	D	L	GF	GA	GD	W	D	L	GF	GA	GD
34	8	14	12	40	50	−10	38	8	7	2	30	18	+12	0	7	10	10	32	−22

==== Results by round ====
Round	1	2	3	4	5	6	7	8	9	10	11	12	13	14	15	16	17	18	19	20	21	22	23	24	25	26	27	28	29	30	31	32	33	34
Ground	H	A	H	A	H	A	H	A	H	A	H	A	H	A	H	H	A	A	H	A	H	A	A	H	A	H	A	H	A	H	A	H	A	H
Result	D	L	W	L	D	L	L	L	W	D	W	L	D	L	W	W	D	D	W	D	D	L	D	W	D	W	L	D	L	L	D	D	L	D
Position	6	15	11	15	14	16	18	17	18	16	17	16	17	16	14	13	11	12	11	11	11	12	12	12	10	10	10	9	10	13	12	12	14	13

Source: Competitive matches
A = Away; H = Home; W = Win; D = Draw; L = Loss

== Matches ==
=== Yugoslav First League ===
Round	Date	Venue	Opponent	Score	Attendance^{1}	Hajduk Scorers
1	2 Aug	H	Red Star	2 – 2	21,472	Bursać, Karačić
2	8 Aug	A	Rad	0 – 2	5,228	
3	16 Aug	H	Osijek	2 – 1	7,950	Adamović, Dražić
4	23 Aug	A	Sutjeska	1 – 3	4,000	Asanović
5	6 Sep	H	Željezničar	0 – 0	5,784	
7	20 Sep	A	Radnički Niš	1 – 2	5,600	Andrijašević
8	27 Sep	H	Dinamo Zagreb	0 – 2	23,129	
9	4 Oct	A	Partizan	0 – 3	10,000	
10	7 Oct	H	Rijeka	3 – 0	6,000	Bursać (2), Čelić
11	17 Oct	A	Sloboda	1 – 1	1,645	Andrijašević
12	25 Oct	H	Sarajevo	5 – 1	4,127	Bursać (2), Vulić, Čelić, Adamović
13	31 Oct	A	Budućnost	0 – 2	3,000	
14	15 Nov	H	Vojvodina	2 – 2	2,919	Bućan, Asanović
15	22 Nov	A	Velež	1 – 3	8,000	Čelić
6	25 Nov	H	Prishtina	3 – 1	5,834	Asanović (2), Adamović
16	29 Nov	H	Čelik	3 – 2	2,000	Čelić (2), Bućan
17	6 Dec	A	Vardar	1 – 1	7,000	Bokšić
18	6 Mar	A	Red Star	1 – 1	15,563	Čelić
19	13 Mar	H	Rad	2 – 1	6,132	Bursać, Asanović
20	20 Mar	A	Osijek	1 – 1	8,253	Krstović
21	27 Mar	H	Sutjeska	0 – 0	4,837	
22	3 Apr	A	Željezničar	0 – 3	5,425	
23	10 Apr	A	Prishtina	1 – 1	10,744	Čelić
24	17 Apr	H	Radnički Niš	1 – 0	4,973	Bursać
25	20 Apr	A	Dinamo Zagreb	1 – 1	29,576	Bokšić
26	24 Apr	H	Partizan	2 – 0	16,626	Bursać (2)
27	1 May	A	Rijeka	1 – 3	7,000	Krstović
28	4 May	H	Sloboda	2 – 2	6,000	Setinov, Papić
29	8 May	A	Sarajevo	0 – 2	2,342	
30	15 May	H	Budućnost	1 – 2	3,811	Čelić
31	22 May	A	Vojvodina	0 – 0	1,648	
32	29 May	H	Velež	2 – 2	7,869	Čelić, Bursać
33	8 Jun	A	Čelik	0 – 3	7,000	
34	12 Jun	H	Vardar	0 – 0	4,000	

Sources: hajduk.hr

=== Yugoslav Cup ===
Round	Date	Venue	Opponent	Score	Attendance	Hajduk Scorers
R1	12 Aug	A	Lučki Radnik Rijeka	2 – 0	10,000	Čelić, Janković (o.g.)
R2	20 Aug	A	Sarajevo	2 – 2	5,000	Bursać, Adamović
R2	12 Nov	H	Sarajevo	1 – 2	2,000	Asanović

Sources: hajduk.hr

=== Cup Winners' Cup ===
Round	Date	Venue	Opponent	Score	Attendance	Hajduk Scorers
R1	16 Sep	A (Denmark)	Aalborg (Denmark)	0 – 1	12,000	
R1	30 Sep	H	Aalborg (Denmark)	1 – 0 (4 – 2 p)	11,000	Asanović
R2	22 Oct	A (France)	Marseille (France)	0 – 4	28,313	
R2	5 Nov	H	Marseille (France)	0 – 3 (2 – 0)^{2}	22,000	Asanović, Bursać

Source: hajduk.hr

== Player seasonal records ==
=== Top scorers ===
Rank	Name	League	Europe	Cup	Total
1	(Socialist Federal Republic of Yugoslavia) Miloš Bursać	10	–	1	11
2	(Socialist Federal Republic of Yugoslavia) Dragutin Čelić	9	–	1	10
2	(Socialist Federal Republic of Yugoslavia) Aljoša Asanović	5	1	1	7
4	(Socialist Federal Republic of Yugoslavia) Zdenko Adamović	3	–	1	4
5	(Socialist Federal Republic of Yugoslavia) Stjepan Andrijašević	2	–	–	2
5	(Socialist Federal Republic of Yugoslavia) Alen Bokšić	2	–	–	2
5	(Socialist Federal Republic of Yugoslavia) Frane Bućan	2	–	–	2
5	(Socialist Federal Republic of Yugoslavia) Radovan Krstović	2	–	–	2
9	(Socialist Federal Republic of Yugoslavia) Darko Dražić	1	–	–	1
9	(Socialist Federal Republic of Yugoslavia) Branko Karačić	1	–	–	1
9	(Socialist Federal Republic of Yugoslavia) Vlado Papić	1	–	–	1
9	(Socialist Federal Republic of Yugoslavia) Dragi Setinov	1	–	–	1
9	(Socialist Federal Republic of Yugoslavia) Zoran Vulić	1	–	–	1
	Own goals	–	–	1	1
	TOTALS	40	1	5	46

Source: Competitive matches

== Notes ==
1. Data for league attendance in most cases reflects the number of sold tickets and may not be indicative of the actual attendance.

2. Match abandoned due to crowd trouble and later voided. Therefore, the match was awarded to Marseille and was Hajduk banned 2 years from European competitions.

== See also ==
- 1987–88 Yugoslav First League
- 1987–88 Yugoslav Cup

== External sources ==
- 1987–88 Yugoslav First League at rsssf.com
- 1987–88 Yugoslav Cup at rsssf.com
- 1987–88 European Cup Winners' Cup at rsssf.com
- 1987–88 Yugoslav First League at historical-lineups.com
