= 1984–85 NK Hajduk Split season =

Hajduk Split
1984–85 season
- Chairman: Ante Kovač
- Manager: Ante Mladinić; Stanko Poklepović
- First League: 2nd
- Yugoslav Cup: Quarter-finals
- Cup Winners' Cup: First round
- Top goalscorer: League: Zlatko Vujović (25); All: Zlatko Vujović (27)
- Highest home attendance: 40,000 v Dynamo Moscow, 3 October 1984
- Lowest home attendance: 2,500 v Jedinstvo Paraćin, 10 October 1984

The 1984–85 season was the 74th season in Hajduk Split’s history and their 39th in the Yugoslav First League. Their 5th place finish in the 1983–84 season meant it was their 39th successive season playing in the Yugoslav First League.

== Competitions ==
=== Overall ===
| Competition | Started round | Final result | First match | Last Match |
|---|---|---|---|---|
| 1984–85 Yugoslav First League | – | 2nd | 19 August | 30 June |
| 1984–85 Yugoslav Cup | First round | Quarter-finals | 29 August | 13 March |
| 1984–85 European Cup Winners' Cup | First round | | 19 September | 3 October |

=== Yugoslav First League ===
==== Classification ====
| Pos | Team | Pld | W | D | L | GF | GA | GD | Pts | Qualification or relegation |
|---|---|---|---|---|---|---|---|---|---|---|
| 1 | Sarajevo (C) | 34 | 19 | 10 | 5 | 51 | 30 | +21 | 48 | Qualification for European Cup first round |
| 2 | Hajduk Split | 34 | 16 | 12 | 6 | 65 | 42 | +23 | 44 | Qualification for UEFA Cup first round |
| 3 | Partizan | 34 | 14 | 11 | 9 | 46 | 34 | +12 | 39 | Qualification for UEFA Cup first round |
| 4 | Red Star Belgrade | 34 | 16 | 6 | 12 | 63 | 38 | +25 | 38 | Qualification for Cup Winners' Cup first round |
| 5 | Vardar | 34 | 16 | 5 | 13 | 67 | 58 | +9 | 37 | Qualification for UEFA Cup first round |

Source: rsssf.org
Rules for classification: 1) points; 2) goal difference; 3) number of goals scored.
(C) Champions

==== Results summary ====
| Overall | | | | | | | | Home | | | | | | Away | | | | | |
| Pld | W | D | L | GF | GA | GD | Pts | W | D | L | GF | GA | GD | W | D | L | GF | GA | GD |
|---|---|---|---|---|---|---|---|---|---|---|---|---|---|---|---|---|---|---|---|
| 34 | 16 | 12 | 6 | 65 | 42 | +23 | 60 | 12 | 4 | 1 | 41 | 17 | +24 | 4 | 8 | 5 | 24 | 25 | −1 |

==== Results by round ====
| Round | 1 | 2 | 3 | 4 | 5 | 6 | 7 | 8 | 9 | 10 | 11 | 12 | 13 | 14 | 15 | 16 | 17 | 18 | 19 | 20 | 21 | 22 | 23 | 24 | 25 | 26 | 27 | 28 | 29 | 30 | 31 | 32 | 33 | 34 |
|---|---|---|---|---|---|---|---|---|---|---|---|---|---|---|---|---|---|---|---|---|---|---|---|---|---|---|---|---|---|---|---|---|---|---|
| Ground | H | H | A | H | A | H | A | H | A | H | A | H | A | H | A | H | A | A | A | H | A | H | A | H | A | H | A | H | A | H | A | H | A | H |
| Result | W | D | W | D | L | W | L | W | L | D | W | W | D | W | D | W | D | D | L | W | D | W | D | D | D | W | W | D | W | W | L | W | D | L |
| Position | 1 | 3 | 2 | 1 | 4 | 3 | 5 | 3 | 5 | 4 | 2 | 2 | 2 | 2 | 2 | 2 | 2 | 2 | 2 | 2 | 2 | 2 | 2 | 2 | 2 | 2 | 2 | 2 | 2 | 2 | 2 | 2 | 2 | 2 |

Source: Competitive matches
A = Away; H = Home; W = Win; D = Draw; L = Loss

== Matches ==
=== Yugoslav First League ===
| Round | Date | Venue | Opponent | Score | Attendance | Hajduk Scorers |
|---|---|---|---|---|---|---|
| 1 | 19 Aug | H | Vojvodina | 5 – 1 | 14,000 | Zl. Vujović, Čelić, Vulić, Gudelj |
| 2 | 26 Aug | H | Partizan | 3 – 3 | 30,000 | Andrijašević, Vulić, Slišković |
| 3 | 2 Sep | A | Budućnost | 3 – 2 | 12,000 | Zl. Vujović (3) |
| 4 | 5 Sep | H | Prishtina | 2 – 2 | 15,000 | Gudelj, Prekazi |
| 5 | 9 Sep | A | Osijek | 0 – 1 | 12,000 | |
| 6 | 16 Sep | H | Radnički Niš | 4 – 0 | 14,000 | Zl. Vujović (3), Gudelj |
| 7 | 23 Sep | A | Sarajevo | 0 – 1 | 10,000 | |
| 8 | 7 Oct | H | Velež | 3 – 1 | 9,000 | Zl. Vujović (2), Slišković |
| 9 | 28 Oct | A | Iskra | 0 – 1 | 10,000 | |
| 10 | 31 Oct | H | Vardar | 3 – 2 | 7,000 | Slišković (2), Zl. Vujović |
| 11 | 4 Nov | A | Red Star | 3 – 1 | 25,000 | Zl. Vujović (2), Deverić |
| 12 | 11 Nov | H | Sutjeska | 1 – 0 | 7,000 | Gudelj |
| 13 | 18 Nov | A | Rijeka | 1 – 1 | 15,000 | Vulić |
| 14 | 21 Nov | H | Dinamo Vinkovci | 3 – 0 | 7,000 | Zl. Vujović (2), Asanović |
| 15 | 24 Nov | A | Sloboda | 0 – 0 | 3,000 | |
| 16 | 2 Dec | H | Željezničar | 2 – 1 | 11,000 | Zl. Vujović, Zo. Vujović |
| 17 | 9 Dec | A | Dinamo Zagreb | 2 – 2 | 45,000 | Slišković (2) |
| 18 | 17 Feb | A | Vojvodina | 1 – 1 | 7,000 | Tipurić |
| 19 | 24 Feb | A | Partizan | 1 – 4 | 12,000 | Zl. Vujović |
| 20 | 3 Mar | H | Budućnost | 2 – 0 | 9,000 | Gudelj, Vulić |
| 21 | 10 Mar | A | Prishtina | 1 – 1 | 32,000 | Gudelj |
| 22 | 17 Mar | H | Osijek | 1 – 0 | 7,000 | Asanović |
| 23 | 7 Apr | A | Radnički Niš | 1 – 1 | 7,000 | Zl. Vujović |
| 24 | 14 Apr | H | Sarajevo | 0 – 0 | 25,000 | |
| 25 | 17 Apr | A | Velež | 1 – 1 | 7,000 | Zl. Vujović |
| 26 | 21 Apr | H | Iskra | 2 – 0 | 6,000 | Zl. Vujović, Asanović |
| 27 | 5 May | A | Vardar | 2 – 1 | 30,000 | Zl. Vujović, Asanović |
| 28 | 12 May | H | Red Star | 1 – 1 | 30,000 | Španjić |
| 29 | 19 May | A | Sutjeska | 3 – 1 | 15,000 | Gudelj (2), Zl. Vujović |
| 30 | 9 Jun | H | Rijeka | 5 – 2 | 8,000 | Gudelj (2), Zl. Vujović (2), Asanović |
| 31 | 12 Jun | A | Dinamo Vinkovci | 1 – 2 | 8,000 | Zo. Vujović |
| 32 | 16 Jun | H | Sloboda | 2 – 0 | 6,000 | Slišković, Memilević (o.g.) |
| 33 | 23 Jun | A | Željezničar | 4 – 4 | 20,000 | Gudelj (2), Zl. Vujović, Šabanadžović (o.g.) |
| 34 | 30 Jun | H | Dinamo Zagreb | 2 – 4 | 15,000 | Adamović, Asanović |

Sources: hajduk.hr

=== Yugoslav Cup ===
| Round | Date | Venue | Opponent | Score | Attendance | Hajduk Scorers |
|---|---|---|---|---|---|---|
| R1 | 29 Aug | A | Radnički Pirot | 1 – 0 | 6,000 | Bakrač |
| R2 | 10 Oct | H | Jedinstvo Paraćin | 5 – 0 | 2,500 | Slišković (2), Deverić, Gudelj, Zl. Vujović |
| QF | 13 Mar | A | Dinamo Zagreb | 1 – 3 | 30,000 | Vulić |

Sources: hajduk.hr

=== Cup Winners' Cup ===
| Round | Date | Venue | Opponent | Score | Attendance | Hajduk Scorers |
|---|---|---|---|---|---|---|
| R1 | 19 Sep | A (Soviet Union) | Dynamo Moscow (Soviet Union) | 0 – 1 | 14,200 | |
| R1 | 3 Oct | HR | Dynamo Moscow (Soviet Union) | 2 – 5 | 40,000 | Deverić, Vujović |

Source: hajduk.hr

== Player seasonal records ==
=== Top scorers ===
| Rank | Name | League | Europe | Cup | Total |
|---|---|---|---|---|---|
| 1 | (Socialist Federal Republic of Yugoslavia) Zlatko Vujović | 25 | 1 | 1 | 27 |
| 2 | (Socialist Federal Republic of Yugoslavia) Ivan Gudelj | 12 | – | 1 | 13 |
| 3 | (Socialist Federal Republic of Yugoslavia) Blaž Slišković | 7 | – | 2 | 9 |
| 4 | (Socialist Federal Republic of Yugoslavia) Aljoša Asanović | 6 | – | – | 6 |
| 5 | (Socialist Federal Republic of Yugoslavia) Zoran Vulić | 4 | – | 1 | 5 |
| 6 | (Socialist Federal Republic of Yugoslavia) Stjepan Deverić | 1 | 1 | 1 | 3 |
| 6 | (Socialist Federal Republic of Yugoslavia) Zoran Vujović | 2 | – | 1 | 3 |
| 8 | (Socialist Federal Republic of Yugoslavia) Zdenko Adamović | 1 | – | – | 1 |
| 8 | (Socialist Federal Republic of Yugoslavia) Stjepan Andrijašević | 1 | – | – | 1 |
| 8 | (Socialist Federal Republic of Yugoslavia) Momir Bakrač | – | – | 1 | 1 |
| 8 | (Socialist Federal Republic of Yugoslavia) Dragutin Čelić | 1 | – | – | 1 |
| 8 | (Socialist Federal Republic of Yugoslavia) Dževad Prekazi | 1 | – | – | 1 |
| 8 | (Socialist Federal Republic of Yugoslavia) Joško Španjić | 1 | – | – | 1 |
| 8 | (Socialist Federal Republic of Yugoslavia) Jerko Tipurić | 1 | – | – | 1 |
| | Own goals | 2 | – | – | 2 |
| | TOTALS | 65 | 2 | 7 | 74 |

Source: Competitive matches

== See also ==
- 1984–85 Yugoslav First League
- 1984–85 Yugoslav Cup

== External sources ==
- 1984–85 Yugoslav First League at rsssf.com
- 1984–85 Yugoslav Cup at rsssf.com
- 1984–85 European Cup Winners' Cup at rsssf.com
- 1984–85 Yugoslav First League at historical-lineups.com
