= Alar (surname) =

Alar is a surname. Notable people with the surname include:

- Goran Alar (born 1962), Croatian footballer
- Deni Alar (born 1990), Austrian Croatian footballer
