= List of FK Vardar presidents =

The following is a list of presidents of the Macedonian FK Vardar football club.

== Presidents ==
Presidents	Nationality	From	Until
Angele Bozhinovski	(Socialist Republic of Macedonia)	1947	1951
Pero Korobar	(Socialist Republic of Macedonia)	1951	1959
Risto Buzharovski	(Socialist Republic of Macedonia)	1960	1963
Vancho Cvetkovski	(Socialist Republic of Macedonia)	1963	1965
Kocho Kitanovski	(Socialist Republic of Macedonia)	1965	1970
Blazho Ristomanov	(Socialist Republic of Macedonia)	1970	1976
Dushko Gjorgiev	(Socialist Republic of Macedonia)	1976	1978
Djodja Nikolovski	(Socialist Republic of Macedonia)	1978	1984
Angel Simov	(Socialist Republic of Macedonia)	1984	1985
Stojan Chaminski	(Socialist Republic of Macedonia)	1985	1989
Filip Gjurchinovski	(Socialist Republic of Macedonia) / (North Macedonia)	1989	1995
Borche Damev	(North Macedonia) / (North Macedonia)	1995	1997
Ljubomir Chadikovski	(North Macedonia)	1997	1998
Aleksandar Trpevski	(North Macedonia)	1998	2003
Dragan Zhivkovikj	(North Macedonia)	2003	2004
Borche Ristevski	(North Macedonia)	2008	
Vancho Shehtanski	(North Macedonia)	2008	
Trifun Kostovski	(North Macedonia)	2008	
Jordan Kamchev	(North Macedonia)	2008	2009
Bojan Zahariev	(North Macedonia)	2009	
Dragi Setinov	(North Macedonia)	2009	2010
Vancho Shehtanski	(North Macedonia)	2010	
Dragi Setinov	(North Macedonia)	2010	
Milovan Majstorovikj	(North Macedonia)	2010	
Atanas Kostovski	(North Macedonia)	2010	2011
Zoran Shishkovski	(North Macedonia)	2011	2014
Mirko Spaseski	(North Macedonia)	2014	
