= Bucan (surname) =

Bucan, Bućan and Bučan are surnames with various origins. Notable people with these surnames include:

Bucan

- Ion Bucan (born 1955), Romanian rugby union player

Bućan

- Aleksandar Bućan (born 1973), Serbian basketball coach
- Frane Bućan (born 1965), Croatian football player
- Lorena Bućan (born 2002), Croatian singer

Bučan

- Sead Bučan (born 1981), Bosnian footballer
