= Momir =

Momir (Serbian: Момир) is a Serbian masculine given name of Slavic origin. The name may refer to:

- Momir Bakrač moca dobaja (born 1957), footballer
- Momir Bulatović (born 1956), politician, former president of Montenegro
- Momir Ilić (born 1981), Serbian handballer
- Momir Karadžić (born 1952), footballer
- Momir Kecman (born 1940), wrestler
- Momir Milatović (born 1955), basketball coach
- Momir Nikolić (born 1955), military commander
- Momir of Lučica (fl. 1804–13), military commander
- Momir Petković (born 1953), wrestler, Olympic champion
- Momir Rnić (handballer born 1955), Yugoslav handball player
- Momir Rnić (handballer born 1987), Serbian handball player
- Momir Savić (born 1951), soldier
- Momir Talić (1942–2003), general
