= Marin Lalić =

Croatian footballer

Personal information
- Date of birth: 30 November 1969 (age 56)
- Place of birth: Bjelovar, SR Croatia, SFR Yugoslavia
- Position: Midfielder

Team information
- Current team: Bjelovar (manager)

Senior career*
Years	Team	Apps	(Gls)
1986–1992	Hajduk Split	17	(1)
1992–1994	Salgueiros	26	(1)
1995	Paços Ferreira	9	(3)
1995–1996	Mladost Suhopolje	27	(14)
1996–1998	NK Zagreb	42	(8)
1998	Mladost Suhopolje	10	(3)
1998–2002	Hrvatski Dragovoljac	67	(23)
2002–2004	Inter Zaprešić	25	(8)
2004–2005	Bjelovar		

Managerial career
- 2014-2016: Bjelovar
- 2017: Bjelovar
- 2022-: Bjelovar
- * Club domestic league appearances and goals

Marin Lalić (born 30 November 1969) is a Croatian retired football midfielder and current manager of Bjelovar.

Lalić had earlier replaced Mario Kos as Bjelovar's manager in April 2017.
