= Jiří Jeslínek (footballer, born 1962) =

Czech footballer (born 1962)

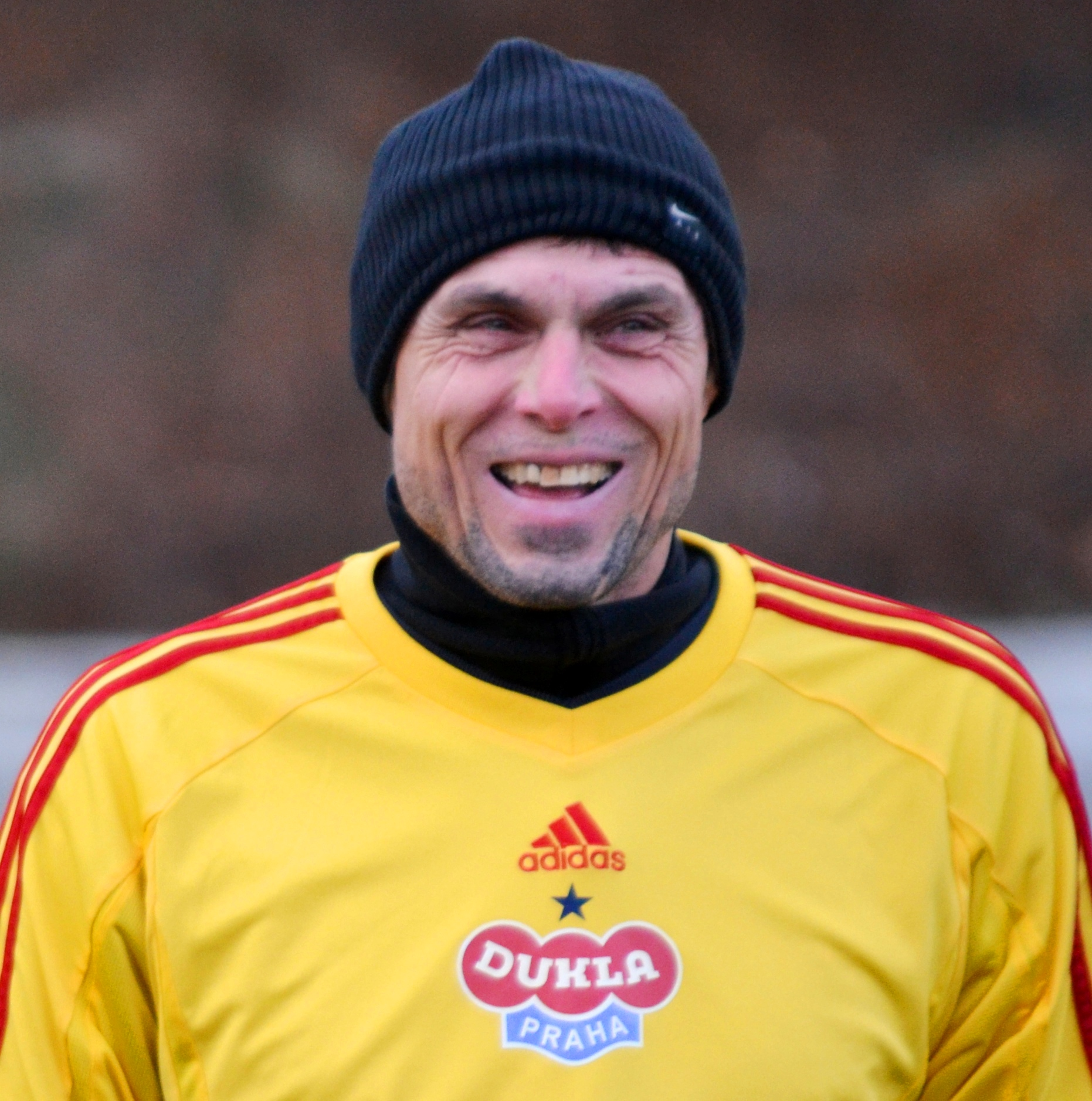
- Jiří Jeslínek (2013)

Personal information
- Date of birth: April 16, 1962 (age 64)
- Place of birth: Prague, Czechoslovakia
- Position: Defender

Senior career*
Years	Team	Apps	(Gls)
1980–1982	Slavia Prague	56	(6)
1982	Dukla Prague	6	(0)
1983–1984	Rudá Hvězda Cheb	36	(1)
1984–1989	Slavia Prague	138	(24)
1990	Union Cheb	21	(2)
1990–1991	Hajduk Split	24	(1)
1991–1992	Sparta Prague	9	(0)
1992–1993	Hradec Králové	38	(4)
1994–1997	Dukla Prague	33	(1)

International career
1985	Czechoslovakia	1	(0)
- * Club domestic league appearances and goals

Jiří Jeslínek (born 16 April 1962) is a Czech former football defender. He played in major Czech football clubs such as Slavia, Dukla and Sparta Prague, and with Hajduk Split in Yugoslavia. He was also a member of the Czechoslovak national team.

== Club career ==
After starting his career in 1980 with Slavia Prague, Jeslínek played between 1982 and 1984 with Dukla Prague and Rudá Hvězda Cheb to gain more experience before returning to Slavia and playing five consecutive seasons. In 1990, after a short spell with FK Union Cheb, he moved to HNK Hajduk Split playing back then in the Yugoslav First League. At the end of the season he returned to the Czechoslovak First League and signed with Sparta Prague where he played the 1991–92 season. Afterwards, he played one and a half seasons with FC Hradec Králové and three and a half with Dukla Prague, playing for both teams in the 1993–94 Gambrinus liga. He retired in 1997. While playing in Yugoslavia, his name was spelled Jirži Jeslinek.

== National team ==
He was part of the Czechoslovak national team in the mid-1980s, having earned one cap in 1985.

== Honours ==
- Slavia Prague:
  - Intercup (1): 1986.
- Dukla Prague:
  - Czechoslovak Cup (1): 1983
- Hajduk Split:
  - Yugoslav Cup (1): 1991
- Sparta Prague:
  - Czechoslovak Cup (1): 1992
