= Mirko Mihić =

Serbian football coach and former player (born 1965)

Personal information
- Date of birth: 24 July 1965 (age 61)
- Place of birth: Belgrade, SFR Yugoslavia
- Position: Forward

Senior career*
Years	Team	Apps	(Gls)
1987–1989	Sloboda Tuzla	67	(25)
1989–1990	Hajduk Split	11	(0)
1990–1991	Rad	8	(0)
1991–1992	Zemun	31	(9)
1992–1994	Eordaikos		
1994–1995	Kavala	6	(1)
1995–1996	AEL Limassol	25	(8)
1996–2000	Nea Salamis Famagusta	89	(38)

International career
1988	Yugoslav Olympic		

Managerial career
- 2009: Nea Salamis
- * Club domestic league appearances and goals

Mirko Mihić (born 24 July 1965) is a Serbian football coach and retired player.

== Club career ==
Born in Belgrade, Serbia, Mihić played as a forward for FK Sloboda Tuzla in the Yugoslav First League. He also played in the Yugoslav First League with Hajduk Split, Rad Belgrade and Zemun. He would later join Eordaikos in the Greek second division and Kavala F.C. in the Greek first division. He finished his career in Cyprus with Nea Salamis Famagusta FC.

== International career ==
Mihić participated for Yugoslavia at the 1988 Olympic Games. He was coach at Nea Salamis for a short period end 2009.
