= Damir Rilje =

Croatian politician

Damir Rilje (born 9 May 1958) is a Croatian politician. A member of the Social Democratic Party of Croatia, he is the current mayor of Trogir and a member of the 7th assembly of the Croatian Parliament.
