= Alen Bokšić =

Croatian footballer

Personal information
- Date of birth: 21 January 1970 (age 56)
- Place of birth: Makarska, SR Croatia, SFR Yugoslavia
- Height: 1.87 m (6 ft 2 in)
- Position: Forward

Youth career
- Zmaj Makarska
- Hajduk Split

Senior career*
Years	Team	Apps	(Gls)
1987–1991	Hajduk Split	95	(27)
1991–1992	Cannes	1	(0)
1992–1993	Marseille	49	(26)
1993–1996	Lazio	67	(17)
1996–1997	Juventus	22	(3)
1997–2000	Lazio	48	(14)
2000–2003	Middlesbrough	68	(22)
Total		359	(116)

International career
1988–1991	Yugoslavia U21	11	(3)
1993–2002	Croatia	40	(10)

Managerial career
- 2012–2013: Croatia (assistant)
Medal record
Representing Yugoslavia
Silver medal – second place	UEFA U-21 Euro	1990
- * Club domestic league appearances and goals

Alen Bokšić (pronounced [bǒkʃitɕ]; born 21 January 1970) is a former Croatian professional footballer. A forward who spent most of his career in France, England and Italy, he was renowned for his technique and power, and is regarded as one of the greatest players in the history of the Croatia national football team.

With Marseille, Bokšić won the 1992–93 UEFA Champions League, and was voted fourth in the 1993 European Footballer of the Year poll. That same year he was named Croatian Footballer of the Year. He also won two Serie A titles in 1997 and 2000 with Juventus and Lazio respectively, and is regarded as one of the best foreign players in the history of Serie A since 1980.

Although selected for Yugoslavia squad at the 1990 FIFA World Cup in Italy, the 20-year-old Bokšić did not play in the tournament, with coach Ivica Osim preferring more experienced forwards in the lineup. Following Croatia's independence from Yugoslavia Bokšić became an integral part of Croatia's national team in the 1990s under coach Miroslav Blažević. He played for Croatia at the 1996 European Championship but was not included in the squad for the 1998 FIFA World Cup in France due to an injury he suffered only weeks before the tournament. Bokšić finally made his World Cup debut at the age of 32 at the 2002 FIFA World Cup in Japan, appearing in all three of the team's group stage matches, before retiring only a year later in 2003.

== Club career ==
=== Hajduk Split ===
Bokšić was born in Makarska and started his club career at Zmaj, from Makarska. As a young player, he moved to Hajduk Split and was introduced into the first team (1987–91). With Hajduk, he won the Yugoslav Cup in 1987 and 1991. In 174 games for Hajduk, he scored 60 goals. Bokšić scored in the 1991 Yugoslavian Cup final against Red Star Belgrade for what proved to be the winning goal. It was the last ever goal scored in the Yugoslavian Cup, as the country dissolved just few months after that.

=== Olympique Marseille ===
Bokšić moved to Cannes in France (1991–92), but was plagued by injuries and played only one game for the entire season.

In the summer of 1992, he was signed by French club Marseille. In his only full season with Marseille (1992–93), he was the Ligue 1 top goalscorer, leading the charts with 23 goals. That season he won the French league, but Marseille were later stripped of the title. His biggest success with the club came in May 1993, when Marseille defeated AC Milan to win the 1993 UEFA Champions League Final. Bokšić was the club's joint top goalscorer in the competition alongside teammate Rudi Völler, as he scored six goals in the 1992–93 UEFA Champions League.

He played another 12 league matches for the club at the beginning of the 1993–94 season, until December 1993, when he was sold to Lazio. Bokšić left the club in the wake of one of the biggest football club scandals in history. In 1994, due to financial irregularities and a match fixing scandal involving then president Bernard Tapie, they suffered enforced relegation to the second division.

=== Lazio ===
After joining Lazio in Italy in 1993, Bokšić was voted fourth for the 1993 European Footballer of the Year, behind winner Roberto Baggio, Dennis Bergkamp and Eric Cantona. In his first half-season with Lazio, Bokšić appeared in 21 Serie A matches, scoring four goals, as Lazio ended fourth.

In the 1994–95 season, Lazio were managed by Zdeněk Zeman, and Bokšić played an important part in the club's best Serie A position since 1974, finishing second. Bokšić was a part of a praised attacking trident formed by Bokšić, Giuseppe Signori and Pierluigi Casiraghi. He scored a total of nine goals in the 1994–95 Serie A season.

=== Juventus ===
In the summer of 1996, Bokšić signed for Juventus, then managed by Marcello Lippi. During his one season with the club, he managed to win three trophies, as Juventus won the 1996–97 Serie A, the 1996 Intercontinental Cup and the 1996 UEFA Super Cup. The club also reached the final of the 1996–97 UEFA Champions League, but lost the match 3–1 against Borussia Dortmund. Bokšić played as a forward until the 88th minute of the match, alongside Christian Vieri, and provided the assist for Alessandro Del Piero's goal. Bokšić was the club's top goalscorer in the competition with four goals. He also netted three goals in 22 league appearances on their way to the Serie A title.

=== Return to Lazio ===
Bokšić returned to Lazio in 1997, now under new manager Sven-Göran Eriksson. In his first season back at the club, he scored ten goals in Serie A, with Lazio finishing seventh in the league; this was a disappointing result for Lazio, but they managed to reach the final of the 1998 UEFA Cup and also won the Coppa Italia that year.

In the 1998–99 season, Lazio won the Supercoppa Italiana, finished second in the league and won the 1998–99 UEFA Cup Winners' Cup. However, Bokšić made only three Serie A appearances due to injury.

The 1999–2000 Season was Bokšić's most successful season with Lazio, as the club won the UEFA Super Cup, the 1999–2000 Serie A title and another Coppa Italia; Bokšić scored four goals en route to the scudetto. After six years of playing in Serie A, he decided to leave Italy at the end of the season.

In 2010, Bokšić was voted number 32 on the list of the best foreign players in the history of Serie A.

=== Middlesbrough ===
Following his spell at Lazio, Bokšić surprised the footballing world by joining English Premier League club Middlesbrough for a transfer fee of £2.5 million. On his debut for Middlesbrough, Boksic scored twice and claimed an assist in a 3–1 win over Coventry City. At the time of his signing, some reports claimed that he had become the highest-paid player in English football, earning a reputed £63,000 per week. However, there are no documented sources for this claim, which was vehemently denied by manager Bryan Robson: "The wages quoted are a total nonsense. I got to hear about this long before anyone else and that's why we acted quickly and decisively. Talk of £63,000 a week is utter rubbish."

Despite his injury problems, he went on to score twelve goals in his first season at Middlesbrough, and was subsequently named their Player of the Year. He was less affected by injuries in the 2001–02 season, but could only muster eight goals in a Boro side short of goals and creativity throughout the entire side. Whilst a Middlesbrough player, he went to the 2002 World Cup finals with Croatia, but failed to score in his country's three group games.

On 1 February 2003, Boksic announced his decision to retire from football, after a succession of injuries had restricted his appearances at the Riverside Stadium. Bokšić came to a mutual agreement with Middlesbrough to bring the curtain down on his illustrious career. His last match for Middlesbrough was on 11 January 2003, in a 2–2 draw with Southampton, while his final goal for the club had come in a memorable 3–1 win over Manchester United on Boxing Day 2002.

== International career ==
Twenty-year-old Bokšić was a member of the Yugoslavia national squad during 1990 World Cup, but coach Ivica Osim did not give him a single minute of action, preferring the more experienced Zlatko Vujović and Darko Pančev for places upfront.

For the Croatia national team, Bokšić was capped 40 times, scoring ten goals. He made his debut for them in a June 1993 friendly match against Ukraine and his final international was an October 2002 European Championship qualification match against Bulgaria. He played for his country at Euro 96. He missed Croatia's surprising third-place run in the 1998 FIFA World Cup due to injury. This was a devastating blow for the Croatian team as they could not pair him together with Davor Šuker. He finally made his World Cup playing debut in the 2002 World Cup at the age of 32.

== Style of play ==
Bokšić was a dynamic, well-rounded, physically strong, and prolific forward, who was renowned for his technique, skill, creativity, movement, power, stamina and pace on the ball, which enabled him to open up defences and create space for his teammates and provide depth to his team with his attacking runs; despite his ability and consistent goalscoring rate throughout his career, he drew criticism at times in the Italian media for his occasional lack of accuracy in front of goal during his time in Serie A. He was also injury prone throughout his career.

== Career statistics ==
=== Club ===
Appearances and goals by club, season and competition
Club	Season	League			National cup (Note: Includes Yugoslav Cup, Coupe de France, Coppa Italia, FA Cup)		League cup (Note: Includes Football League Cup)		Continental		Other		Total	
Club	Season	Division	Apps	Goals	Apps	Goals	Apps	Goals	Apps	Goals	Apps	Goals	Apps	Goals
Hajduk Split	1987–88	Yugoslav First League	13	2	0	0	–		–		–		13	2
Hajduk Split	1988–89	Yugoslav First League	26	7	1	0	–		–		–		27	7
Hajduk Split	1989–90	Yugoslav First League	27	12	7	1	–		–		–		34	13
Hajduk Split	1990–91	Yugoslav First League	29	6	7	2	–		–		–		36	8
Hajduk Split	Total		95	27	15	3	–		–		–		110	30
Cannes	1991–92	Division 1	1	0	0	0	–		–		–		1	0
Marseille	1992–93	Division 1	37	23	1	0	–		8 (Note: Appearances in UEFA Champions League)	6	–		46	29
Marseille	1993–94	Division 1	12	3	0	0	–		–		–		12	3
Marseille	Total		49	26	1	0	–		8	6	–		58	32
Lazio	1993–94	Serie A	21	4	0	0	–		0	0	–		21	4
Lazio	1994–95	Serie A	23	9	3	0	–		6 (Note: Appearances in UEFA Cup)	2	–		32	11
Lazio	1995–96	Serie A	23	4	1	0	–		1	0	–		25	4
Lazio	Total		67	17	4	0	–		7	2	–		78	19
Juventus	1996–97	Serie A	22	3	2	0	–		8	4	1 (Note: Appearance in Intercontinental Cup)	0	34	7
Lazio	1997–98	Serie A	26	10	6	5	–		6	0	–		38	15
Lazio	1998–99	Serie A	3	0	0	0	–		3 (Note: Appearances in UEFA Cup Winners' Cup)	1	0	0	6	1
Lazio	1999–2000	Serie A	19	4	4	3	–		11	1	–		34	8
Lazio	Total		48	14	10	8	–		20	2	0	0	78	24
Middlesbrough	2000–01	Premier League	28	12	3	0	0	0	–		–		31	12
Middlesbrough	2001–02	Premier League	22	8	0	0	1	0	–		–		23	8
Middlesbrough	2002–03	Premier League	18	2	1	0	0	0	–		–		19	2
Middlesbrough	Total		68	22	4	0	1	0	–		–		73	22
Career total			350	109	36	11	1	0	43	13	1	0	429	133

=== International ===
Appearances and goals by national team and year
National team	Year	Apps	Goals
Croatia	1993	1	0
Croatia	1994	4	0
Croatia	1995	6	2
Croatia	1996	5	2
Croatia	1997	7	2
Croatia	1998	1	1
Croatia	1999	5	1
Croatia	2000	4	1
Croatia	2001	2	1
Croatia	2002	5	0
Total		40	10

Scores and results list Croatia's goal tally first, score column indicates score after each Bokšić goal.

List of international goals scored by Alen Bokšić
No.	Date	Venue	Opponent	Score	Result	Competition
1	3 September 1995	Stadion Maksimir, Zagreb, Croatia	Estonia	3–1	7–1	UEFA Euro 1996 qualifying
2	8 October 1996	Renato Dall'Ara, Bologna, Italy	Bosnia and Herzegovina	3–1	4–1	1998 FIFA World Cup qualification
3	8 October 1996	Renato Dall'Ara, Bologna, Italy	Bosnia and Herzegovina	4–1	4–1	1998 FIFA World Cup qualification
4	11 October 1997	Bežigrad Stadium, Ljubljana, Slovenia	Slovenia	3–0	3–1	1998 FIFA World Cup qualification
5	15 November 1997	Olympic Stadium, Kyiv, Ukraine	Ukraine	1–1	1–1	1998 FIFA World Cup qualification
6	22 April 1998	Gradski Vrt Stadium, Osijek, Croatia	Poland	4–0	4–1	Friendly
7	9 October 1999	Stadion Maksimir, Zagreb, Croatia	(Federal Republic of Yugoslavia) Yugoslavia	1–0	2–2	UEFA Euro 2000 qualifying
8	26 April 2000	Ernst-Happel-Stadion, Vienna, Austria	Austria	1–1	2–1	Friendly
9	11 October 2000	Stadion Maksimir, Zagreb, Croatia	Scotland	1–0	1–1	2002 FIFA World Cup qualification
10	6 October 2001	Stadion Maksimir, Zagreb, Croatia	Belgium	1–0	1–0	2002 FIFA World Cup qualification

== Honours ==
=== Player ===
Hajduk Split

- Yugoslav Cup: 1990–91

Marseille

- UEFA Champions League: 1992–93

Juventus

- Serie A: 1996–97
- Intercontinental Cup: 1996
- UEFA Champions League runner-up: 1996–97

Lazio

- Serie A: 1999–2000
- Coppa Italia: 1997–98, 1999–2000
- UEFA Cup Winners' Cup: 1998–99

=== Individual ===
- French Division 1 top scorer: 1992–93
- French Division 1 Foreign Player of the Year: 1993
- Onze d'Argent: 1993
- 1993 Ballon d'Or: 4th place
- Croatian Footballer of the Year: 1993
- Middlesbrough Supporters' club player of the year: 2000–01

=== Orders ===
- Order of Danica Hrvatska with face of Franjo Bučar: 1995
- Order of the Croatian Trefoil: 1998

== Personal life ==
Bokšić married Ajda in 1990. The couple had three children (daughter Stella and sons Toni and Alen) before divorcing in 2000.

In 2004 from a relationship with girlfriend Jadranka Bokšić had another daughter Laura.
