= Deni Alar =

Austrian footballer (born 1990)

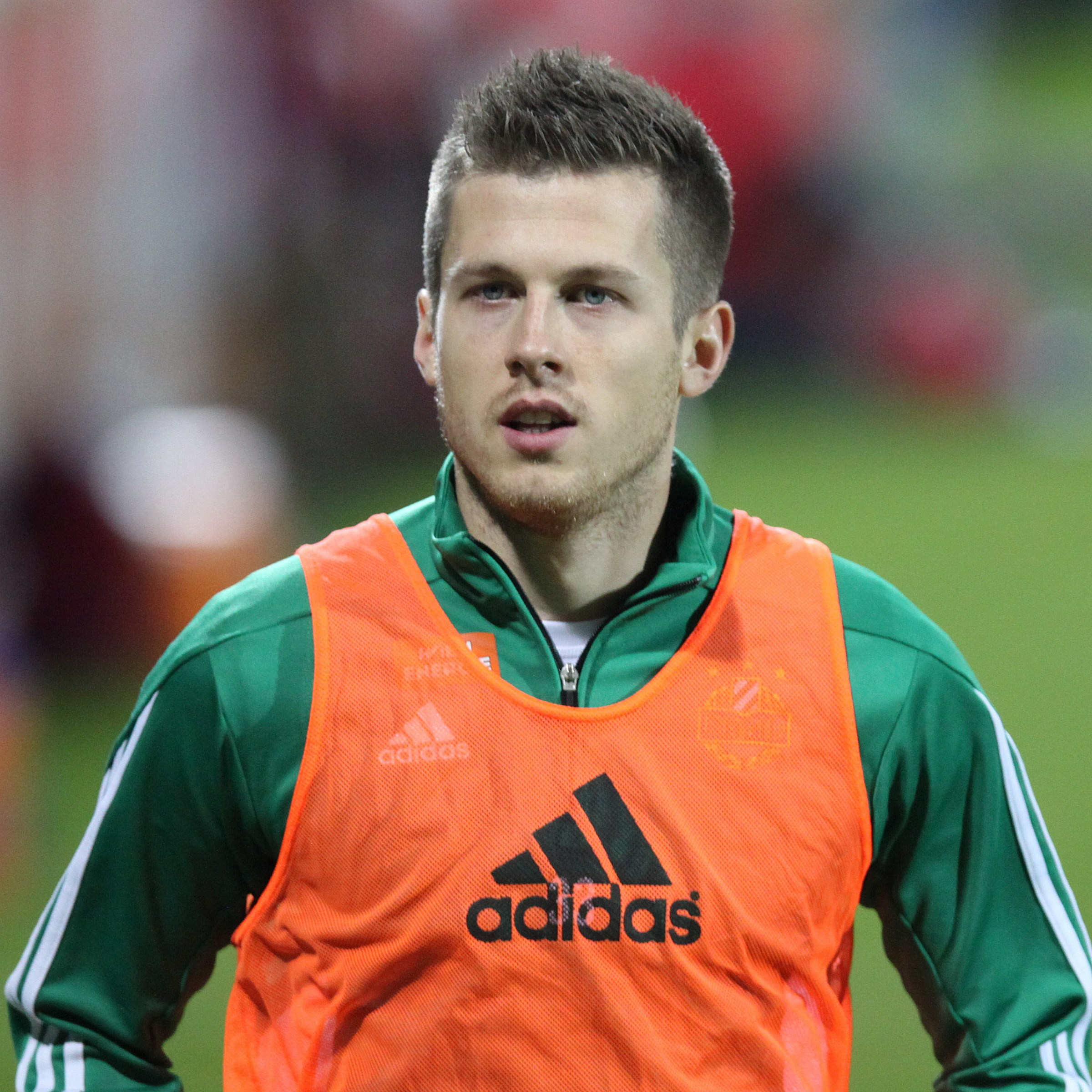
- Alar in 2015

Personal information
- Date of birth: 18 January 1990 (age 36)
- Place of birth: Slavonski Brod, SR Croatia, SFR Yugoslavia
- Height: 1.85 m (6 ft 1 in)
- Position: Striker

Team information
- Current team: Admira Wacker
- Number: 9

Youth career
- 1996–2006: FC Zeltweg

Senior career*
Years	Team	Apps	(Gls)
2007–2009	Leoben	43	(4)
2009–2011	Kapfenberg	63	(21)
2011–2016	Rapid Wien	116	(35)
2016–2018	Sturm Graz	70	(36)
2018–2021	Rapid Wien	24	(5)
2019–2020	→ Levski Sofia (loan)	22	(2)
2021–2022	St. Pölten	14	(5)
2022–2023	First Vienna	24	(3)
2023–2024	Leoben	22	(16)
2024–	Admira Wacker	42	(17)

International career
2009–2012	Austria U21	16	(4)
2017–2018	Austria	2	(0)
- * Club domestic league appearances and goals as of 17 May 2026

Deni Alar (born 18 January 1990) is an Austrian professional footballer who plays as a striker for 2. Liga club Admira Wacker.

== Club career ==
Born in Slavonski Brod, SR Croatia, then part of Yugoslavia, Alar played for Austrian Bundesliga side Kapfenberger SV before joining Rapid Wien on 3 June 2011. This transfer was announced on 3 June 2011.

On 9 May 2018, he featured as Sturm Graz defeated Red Bull Salzburg in extra time to win the 2017–18 Austrian Cup. Alar later returned to Rapid Wien, and on 26 June 2019, he was loaned to Levski Sofia in Bulgaria for one year, with an option to extend his stay for two additional seasons on a permanent basis.

On 28 June 2021, he signed a one-year contract with SKN St. Pölten.

Alar moved to Austrian Regionalliga East club First Vienna on 5 February 2022, signing a one-year contract.

In June 2024, Alar joined 2. Liga club Admira Wacker.

== International career ==
Alar received his first call-up to the senior Austria national football team for a 2018 FIFA World Cup qualifier against the Republic of Ireland national football team in June 2017. He made his debut on 14 November 2017, in a 2–1 friendly win against the Uruguay national football team, replacing Marko Arnautović in the 86th minute.

== Personal life ==
He is the son of former Croatian footballer Goran Alar.

== Honours ==
Sturm Graz

- Austrian Cup: 2017–18

Individual

- Austrian Bundesliga Team of the Year: 2016–17, 2017–18
