= Zvezdan Pejović =

Montenegrin footballer

Zvjezdan Pejović
Personal information
- Date of birth: 28 October 1966 (age 60)
- Place of birth: Titograd, SFR Yugoslavia
- Height: 1.95 m (6 ft 5 in)
- Position: Defender

Senior career*
Years	Team	Apps	(Gls)
1984	OFK Titograd	15	(1)
1985–1988	Budućnost Titograd	55	(2)
1988–1993	Hajduk Split	55	(4)
1993	VfL Osnabrück	1	(0)
1993–1994	Carl Zeiss Jena	15	(2)
1994–1996	Fortuna Düsseldorf	14	(0)
1996–1997	Eintracht Frankfurt	14	(0)
Total		140	(8)
- * Club domestic league appearances and goals

Zvjezdan Pejović (born 28 October 1966) is a Montenegrin former professional footballer who played as a defender for several clubs in Yugoslavia and Germany.

== Club career ==
Pejović played for OFK Titograd, FK Budućnost Titograd and Hajduk Split in Yugoslavia (until spring 1993 although he did not play official matches in Croatian league since its inception at the end of 1991), and for VfL Osnabrück, FC Carl Zeiss Jena, Fortuna Düsseldorf and Eintracht Frankfurt in Germany.
