= Damir Vitas =

Croatian footballer

Personal information
- Full name: Damir Vitas
- Date of birth: 11 March 1981 (age 45)
- Place of birth: SFR Yugoslavia
- Height: 1.92 m (6 ft 4 in)
- Position: Central defender

Senior career*
Years	Team	Apps	(Gls)
2002–2003	Radnički Bajmok		
2004–2005	Sileks Kratovo	12	(1)
2006–2007	Međimurje	37	(1)
2008	Ljungskile	10	(0)
2009–2010	Thrasyvoulos	7	(0)
2010–2011	Međimurje		
2011-2015	SC-Pfaffstätten	95	(11)
2015-2017	SC Schönau	46	(3)
- * Club domestic league appearances and goals as of 2008-12-30

Damir Vitas (born 11 March 1981) is a Croatian-Macedonian retired footballer who last played for SC Schönau.

== Club career ==
Vitas previously played for Serbian club FK Radnički Bajmok, Macedonian FK Sileks and NK Međimurje in the Croatian First League. Later he played for Ljungskile SK in Sweden, and Thrasyvoulos in Greece. and Pfaffstätten and Schonau in Austria.
