= Damir Kaletović =

Damir Kaletović is an investigative journalist from Tuzla, Bosnia and Herzegovina. He is a former reporter for FTV, the public-service broadcasting organization of the Federation of Bosnia and Herzegovina entity of Bosnia and Herzegovina, the former co-host of the FTV-sponsored political talk show "60 Minutes", and a former reporter for OBN Television. He is best known for his high-profile role as co-host of "60 Minutes", which controversially investigated issues related post-war corruption and war crimes.

He has won numerous awards, including

- 2005 "Most Deserving Journalist of the Year" in Bosnia-Herzegovina.
- 2005 Max Magazine Television Personality "Man of the Year"
- 2008 San News "Best Person of the Year"

During his career, he has been the target of various threats, some of them openly expressed.

His work has been perceived as controversial by Bosnia-Herzegovina's main ethno-nationalist political parties: the Bosniak Muslim Party of Democratic Action (SDA); the Croatian Democratic Union (HDZ); and the Serbian Democratic Party (SDS).

He became unpopular among some nationalist groupings of Bosniak Muslims for his reporting on terrorism in the aftermath of the 11 September 2001 terrorist attacks, and specifically for his reporting on the Algerian Group in Bosnia-Herzegovina. In some of his reportages he accused six Algerians of alleged terrorism. He also sparked criticism for his reporting on islamic fundamentalism and the war crimes of Alija Izetbegović, the first president of Bosnia and Herzegovina.

He has equally been viewed as controversial for his reporting on corruption, organized crime and war crimes in the Bosnian Serb-dominated entity of Republika Srpska in Bosnia-Herzegovina.
