= Damir Zaynullin =

Russian murder victim (died 2007)

Damir Tahir ulı Zaynullin (Russian: Дамир Тагирович Зайнуллин, Tatar: Дәмир Таһир улы Зайнуллин, romanized: Dämir Tahir ulı Zaynullin ; ~ - 1 July 2007), was a 23-year-old Saint-Petersburg-born ethnic Tatar who was brutally murdered on July 1, 2007, by a gang of 17 people. Allegedly, the killers were Russian far-right skinheads.

On his way to work, he was killed at 79 Stachek Prospect, near Avtovo station of Saint Petersburg Metro; not far from police precinct number 31. Security cameras seem to indicate that 17 attackers were involved, one of them a young woman. The attackers first ripped open Zaynullin's belly to prevent him from running away, then beat him severely, and finally used a broken glass bottle to cut his arteries, causing him to bleed to death. Zaynullin was buried in the Southern Cemetery of Saint Petersburg, on 7 July 2007. Eight suspects had been arrested, but they were all released without charges. One suspect, Mariya Khapilina, gave herself up on 13 July 2007. Khapilina's father says that like the victim, she is of Tatar ethnicity.

This deliberate assassination of a young man, who had graduated from the Agricultural University only a day before he was killed, was not even covered by the mainstream media in Saint Petersburg. However, it took resonance in the Tatar and anti-fascist media, and is often seen as a racist attack. Many anti-fascist and Tatar groups, including the All-Tatar Public Center, state that Zaynullin was killed as a result of an ultra-nationalist attack.
