= Damir Amangeldin =

Kazakh actor and comedian (born 2002)

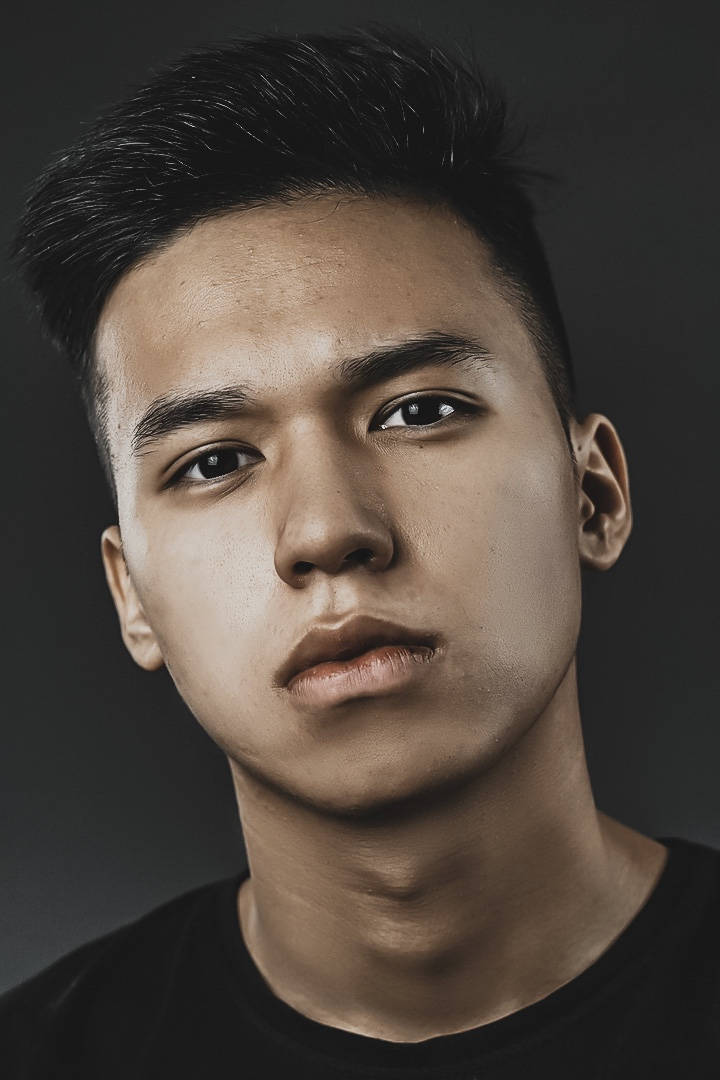
- Born: Amangeldin Damir Ravilevich; January 27, 2002 (age 24); Almaty, Kazakhstan,
- Occupations: Actor, TV host, comedian
- Years active: 2017–present
- Website: damiramangeldin.com

Damir Amangeldin (Russian: Дамир Амангельдин; born January 27, 2002) is a Kazakh actor of theater and cinema, comedian. Winner of the sign of public recognition "Star of Artek" within the framework of the fifth session "The History of Our Victory"

== Biography ==
He was born on January 27, 2002, in the city of Almaty. Graduated from high school – lyceum number 64 in 2020. During his studies he was a member of the "KVN" team, was a member of the student council, played in the theater studio "Graviton" under the direction of S.V.Tsikh. For the first time he loudly declared himself in 2018 after the release of the TV series "Insomnia" on the seventh channel. Thanks to his non-standard subtle humor, he became a member of the KVN team "Capital People" and for a long time played in the national team of the KVN school "National team of 64 school-lyceum". Throughout the period, he continued to play in KVN and performed in the stand-up comedy genre for three years. He began to engage in stand-up thanks to the capital's events, where the artist conducted these concerts, and often performed. The comedian often jokes about school, parents, and kids. In the future, the artist plans to expand the border and engage in humor already in Russia. Damir devotes most of his time to filming various shows on YouTube, publishing his poems, as well as movies. According to him, it usually takes bloggers from seven hours to several days to shoot one video.

After graduation, the actor is invited to enter the faculty of acting and directing at GITIS. During his studies, he acquired the skills of playing national instruments. In 2016, the actor joined the young studio of the Academic Creative Studio "Graviton" in Nur-Sultan, under the leadership of Stanislav Vladimirovich Tsikh. And in 2017 he was invited to the New Year's solo performance "The Nutcracker"of this theater, where he is also involved in the performances "Time of Romantics", Shakespeare as Romeo, "Alice in Wonderland" as the author-reader.

At the age of 15 he made his debut on the screens – in 2017, he played a cameo role of his grandson in the feature film Traveler. Beginning (2017). At the age of 16, Damir was invited to the troupe of the capital's theater "Graviton". Since 2017, the actor began to appear frequently on screens. At first, the 16-year-old actor was lucky enough to get into the ambitious and scandalous project of the Kazakh director Akan Satayev "The Leader 's Way". The actor played the role of the son of the protagonist Alimzhan. Then he played the lead role in the acclaimed television series Insomnia by Svetlana Petriichuk (2018). Damir Amangeldin embodied the image of a street child, Dastan, who witnesses negative events.

This was followed by the popular short film "I love NS" (2019), where he played a supporting role. And in the same year, the actor cemented his fame among viewers by appearing on a popular podcast show in Kazakhstan, tentatively titled "-18". In it, residents discuss various topics, problems of society and give their own life examples to viewers.

== Acting career ==
In 2015–2017, he served at the Graviton Theater in Nur-Sultan.

In November 2018, the premiere of the successful television series "Insomnia" took place, in which the role of Dastan, one of the main characters, was played by [Kazakh] actor Damir Amangeldin.

In 2019, the actor starred in the short film "I love NS".

In 2019, he starred in the short film by Maxim Pak "Fountain".

On October 14, 2018, Damir acted as a headliner at the Golden Microphone [awards] ceremony.

On April 7, 2019, Damir's debut album, "Poems of a Favorite Poet", was released.

On January 2, 2019, a big solo concert of the performer took place at the Bus club, dedicated to the new material of the

humorous genre of improvisation.

Holder of the sign of public recognition "Star of Artek" – 5th shift in 2018.

In October 2019, the premiere of the successful show on YouTube "-18", featuring Damir Amangeldin, took place.

In 2020, the artist is invited to the Russian psychological drama "VIRUS" based on real events. We are talking about a pandemic that has affected the majority of the world's population. According to the plot of the film, the post-apocalyptic drama will show the third world war against the Virus from the East. According to the creators of the motion picture, the film is planned to be nominated for an "Oscar".

In September 2018, he received the first serious offer from Svetlana Petriichuk, it was work on the television series Insomnia as an actor.

Winner of the international award "Magic Voice" from Lina Arifulina.

In 2020, he starred in the feature film "Cloud".

== Theatrical works ==
=== Theater "Graviton" ===
- 2017 – "The Nutcracker" based on the ballet by P. Tchaikovsky, director Stanislav Tsikh – The Nutcracker .
- 2016 – "Alice in Wonderland" – Author, storyteller.
- 2016 – "Romeo and Juliet" – Romeo.
- 2016 – "Time for Romantics" based on the tragedy of William Shakespeare "Romeo and Juliet", director Stanislav Tsikh – Romeo
- 2016 – "The Nutcracker . New Year's" based on PI Tchaikovsky 's ballet, director Stanislav Tsikh – The Nutcracker .

== Filmography ==
- 2017 – Traveler. Start – Grandfather's Grandson
- 2017 – The path of the leader. Astana – Son of Alimzhan
- 2017 – Live Classics – The Reader
- 2018 – Insomnia – Dastan
- 2019 – I love NS – Botan
- 2019 – Minus 18 – Damir
- 2020 – Cloud – Racket
- 2020 – Virus – Timur

== Filming in clips ==
- 2019 – "The River of Love" ( Zhuldyz Ualikhan ).

== Awards ==
- Winner of the sign of public recognition "Star of Artek" within the framework of the fifth session "The History of Our Victory" – 5th session of 2018.
- Bronze statuette of the International Prize "Magic Voice" in the nomination "[Theater]" from the Russian producer Lina Arifulina (2017).
