= Damir Siraciev =

Volga Tatar theatre director and actor

Damir Siraciev (Tatar: Дамир Сираҗиев, Russian: Дамир Сиразиев, romanized: Damir Siraziev, born October 17, 1954) was a Volga Tatar theatre director and actor. He was born Siraziev Raid Ravilovich (Russian: Сиразиев Раид Равилович) in Kaybitsky District and later moved to Kazan. He died on 17 December 1998. His grave was visited during Second World Congress of Tatars (WCT) in August 2002. He is interred at the Tatar Cemetery in Kazan.

Siraciev was the director in both Tinçurin Theater and Kamal Theater in Kazan, Tatarstan, Russia, who tried to bring a fresh look on theater as an art . He was first who established cultural relations with Tatars living in Turkey. In 1991 on his initiative (together with his close friend composer Masguda Shamsutdinova) the TÜMATA folk and mystic music band were invited to Kazan. Their three concerts in Tinçurin Theater were a great success. Another important contribution of Damir Siraciev was his role in organizing the visit of the world-known ballet dancer Rudolf Nureyev to Kazan and his appearance, already heavily affected by AIDS, in front of the audience at Musa Cälil Tatar Academic Opera and Ballet Theater in Kazan in March 1992 as a conductor .

== Career ==
- actor (The Wanderer in Bulgar and others)
- theatre director (Axir zaman (adaptation of Chinghiz Aitmatov's The Scaffold), 1987; Magdi (English: Messiah), 1990–91; Story of Söyembikä June 21–22, 1991; Ğäliäbanu, never staged)
- MP in Tatarstan Parliament between 1990 and 1995.*co-founder and deputy director of Foundation for the Preservation and Development of the Tatar Language and Culture - Cíın.

== Damir Siraciev Prize ==
In 1999 the Cíın (Tatar: Җыен) Foundation for the Preservation and Development of the Tatar Language and Culture, Ministry of Culture of the Republic of Tatarstan, and Kamal Theater established the annual Damir Siraciev Prize for achievements in theatrical arts. Among the recipients are Marsel Sälimcanov, Tufan Miñnullin, Aleksandr Slavutskiy, Robert Mortazin, Renat Ğäliev,), İslamiä Mäxmüteva, Rifqät Yaqupov, Firdäwes Xäyrullina, İskädär Äxmätwäliev.
