= Goran Alar =

Croatian footballer

Personal information
- Full name: Goran Alar
- Date of birth: 1 May 1962 (age 64)
- Place of birth: Sibinj, PR Croatia, FPR Yugoslavia
- Height: 1.86 m (6 ft 1 in)
- Position: Striker

Senior career*
Years	Team	Apps	(Gls)
–1984	BSK Slavonski Brod		
1984–1988	Osijek	85	(17)
1988–1989	Hajduk Split	18	(2)
1989–1991	Borac Banja Luka	46	(7)
1991–1992	Alpine Donawitz	6	(0)
1992–2000	Zeltweg		
Total		155	(27)

Managerial career
- 2005-2006: Zeltweg
- 2007-2008: Raiffeisen Weißkirchen
- 2009: Zeltweg
- 2009–2010: Raiffeisen Weißkirchen
- * Club domestic league appearances and goals

Goran Alar (born 1 May 1962) is a Croatian retired professional association football striker.

== Club career ==
He played for several Croatian and Austrian football teams. He scored 71 goals for FC Zeltweg. His son is Deni Alar.

== Managerial career ==
After retiring as a player, Alar remained in Austria to coach lower league clubs Zeltweg and Weißkirchen.
