= Damir Čerkić =

Bosnian-Herzegovinian footballer (born 1969)

Personal information
- Full name: Damir Čerkić
- Date of birth: 14 February 1969 (age 57)
- Place of birth: Mostar, SFR Yugoslavia
- Position: Defender

Senior career*
| Years | Team | Apps | (Gls) |
| 1988–1990 | Velež Mostar | 32 | (0) |
| 1991 | Hajduk Split | 10 | (1) |
| 1991–1992 | Borac Banja Luka | 16 | (0) |
| 1992–1993 | B 1909 Odense | 10 | (0) |
- * Club domestic league appearances and goals

Damir Čerkić (born 14 February 1969) is a former Bosnian-Herzegovinian football player, from the late 1980s and the beginning of the 1990s.

== Club career ==
Čerkić was product of Velež Mostar youth system and after spending two and a half seasons in first team of Velež, in spring of 1991 he joined Hajduk Split. When war in Croatia began, he moved to Borac Banja Luka. There, he was the part of the team which defeated Red Star Belgrade in 1991/92 season. Afterwards, he moved to Denmark to play for B 1909 Odense.
