= Damir Jurković =

Croatian footballer (born 1970)

Personal information
- Date of birth: 8 June 1970 (age 56)
- Place of birth: SFR Yugoslavia
- Position: Defender

Senior career*
Years	Team	Apps	(Gls)
1987–1990	Hajduk	36	(0)
1990–1994	Zagreb	79	(2)
1994	Istra	13	(1)
1995–1997	Segesta	64	(0)
1997–1998	Samobor	25	(1)
- * Club domestic league appearances and goals

Damir Jurković (born 8 June 1970) is a Croatian former professional footballer who played as a defender.
