= Momir Bakrač =

Yugoslav footballer (born 1957)

Personal information
- Full name: Momir Bakrač
- Date of birth: 1957 (age 68–69)
- Place of birth: Nikšić, SFR Yugoslavia
- Position: Midfielder

Senior career*
Years	Team	Apps	(Gls)
1975–1977	Sutjeska	20	(2)
1977–1984	Budućnost	169	(18)
1984–1985	Hajduk Split	23	(0)
1985–1986	Sutjeska	18	(2)
1986–1988	Brescia		
- * Club domestic league appearances and goals

Momir Bakrač (born 1957 in Nikšić) is a former Yugoslav football player, from the 1970s and 1980s.

Bakrač was known for playing for several Yugoslav football clubs. He has a younger brother named Miomir who was also football player.
