= Miloš Bursać =

Serbian footballer (born 1964)

Personal information
- Date of birth: 23 June 1964 (age 62)
- Place of birth: Belgrade, SR Serbia, SFR Yugoslavia
- Height: 1.84 m (6 ft 0 in)
- Position: Striker

Youth career
- Red Star Belgrade

Senior career*
Years	Team	Apps	(Gls)
1982–1983	Galenika Zemun	18	(4)
1983–1988	Hajduk Split	64	(18)
1985–1986	→ Sutjeska Nikšić (loan)	31	(20)
1988–1989	Red Star Belgrade	29	(6)
1989–1990	Toulon	48	(17)
1990–1992	Olympique Lyon	41	(5)
1992–1993	Celta Vigo	14	(2)
1993–1994	Royal Antwerp	13	(3)
1994–1996	Atlético Marbella	52	(8)
1996–1997	Kansas City Attack (indoor)	7	(2)
1998–1999	RWDM	0	(0)
1999–2000	Sutjeska Nikšić	5	(2)
2002–2003	Racing Mol-Wezel		
Total		322	(87)

International career
1985	Yugoslavia	2	(0)
- * Club domestic league appearances and goals

Miloš Bursać (Serbian Cyrillic: Милош Бурсаћ; born 23 June 1964) is a Serbian retired footballer who played as a striker.

== Club career ==
Bursać had a breakthrough season with Sutjeska Nikšić in 1985–86, finishing as the league's second-highest scorer with 20 goals.

== International career ==
Bursać was capped twice for Yugoslavia, making his international debut in a 2–1 home loss to East Germany on 28 September 1985. His last cap for the national team came in a 2–0 away loss against France on 16 November of the same year.

== Honours ==
Hajduk Split

- Yugoslav Cup: 1983–84, 1986–87
