= Radovan Krstović =

Serbian footballer

- Krstović while with Hajduk

Personal information
- Date of birth: 17 September 1963 (age 63)
- Place of birth: Nova Pazova, SFR Yugoslavia
- Height: 1.82 m (6 ft 0 in)
- Position: Winger

Senior career*
Years	Team	Apps	(Gls)
1983–1984	Olimpija Ljubljana	8	(1)
1984–1986	GOŠK-Jug	63	(16)
1987–1990	Hajduk Split	51	(7)
1990–1991	Željezničar Sarajevo	15	(5)
1991–1992	Alpine Donawitz	16	(1)
1993–1994	Olympiacos Volos		
1994–1995	Doxa Drama	26	(5)
1995–1996	Enosis Neon Paralimni	15	(1)
- * Club domestic league appearances and goals

Radovan Krstović (Serbian Cyrillic: Радован Крстовић; born 17 September 1963) is a Serbian retired footballer.

== Career ==
He started his career out in his hometown club Radnički Nova Pazova after which he proceeded to play for Srem from Sremska Mitrovica. He became a full professional upon signing with Olimpija Ljubljana in 1983.
