= Grgica Kovač =

Croatian footballer

Personal information
- Full name: Grgica Kovač
- Date of birth: 5 June 1966 (age 60)
- Place of birth: Split, SFR Yugoslavia
- Position: Defender

Team information
- Current team: Hrvace (manager)

Senior career*
Years	Team	Apps	(Gls)
1987–1991	Hajduk Split	31	(1)
1991–1992	Varteks	17	(7)
1992–1993	Lokeren	11	(0)
1993–1994	Nîmes	19	(0)
1994–1996	Varteks	48	(5)
1996–1997	Hapoel Haifa	23	(1)
1997–1998	Hajduk Split	20	(0)
1998–1999	Slaven Belupo	23	(0)
2000	Varteks	18	(1)
2001	Orlen Płock	10	(0)
Total		220	(15)

Managerial career
- 2005: USKOK Klis
- –2007: Val
- Croatia Zmijavci
- Omiš
- 2015–2016: Solin
- 2016–2018: BŠK Zmaj
- 2021: Kamen Ivanbegovina
- 2022–: Hrvace
- * Club domestic league appearances and goals

Grgica Kovač (born 5 June 1966) is a Croatian football manager and former player who is currently in charge of Hrvace.

== Managerial career ==
Kovač took charge of Solin after Ante Terze got the sack in November 2015 and was then named manager of BŠK Zmaj in October 2016. He left the club in May 2018. In February 2022, he succeeded Stipe Grčić as manager of Hrvace.
