= Frane Bućan =

Croatian footballer

Personal information
- Date of birth: 25 August 1965 (age 61)
- Place of birth: Split, SFR Yugoslavia
- Position: Midfielder

Senior career*
Years	Team	Apps	(Gls)
1985–1986	Šibenik	30	(6)
1987–1989	Hajduk Split	43	(5)
1989–1991	Genk	58	(9)
1991–1992	MVV	20	(3)
1992–1994	Genk	28	(2)
1995	VfL Rheinbach		
1995–1996	Bonner SC	17	(0)
1996–1997	SV Rhenania Würselen		
1997–1998	C.S. Visé		
- * Club domestic league appearances and goals

Frane Bućan (born 25 August 1965) is a Croatian former professional footballer who played as a midfielder for HNK Šibenik, Hajduk Split, Genk, MVV, among other clubs.

== Career ==
Bućan was born in Split. He played in Belgium for Genk from 1989 until 1994, except for one season at Dutch side MVV. At Genk he formed an attacking partnership with Maltese forward Carmel Busuttil.
