= Jerko Tipurić =

Bosnian-Belgian footballer and manager

Personal information
- Full name: Jerko Tipurić
- Date of birth: 14 June 1960 (age 66)
- Place of birth: Konjic, SFR Yugoslavia
- Position: Defender

Senior career*
Years	Team	Apps	(Gls)
1975–1980	Igman Konjic		
1980–1983	NK Zagreb	54	(3)
1983–1984	Čelik Zenica	41	(7)
1985–1989	Hajduk Split	89	(6)
1989–1992	Cercle Brugge	99	(6)
1992–1994	Beerschot		

Managerial career
- 1994–1996: Cercle Brugge
- Waregem
- Roeselare
- 1999: Roeselare
- Roeselare (youth coach)
- Cercle Oedelem
- 2001: RC Zuid-West
- 2002–2004: Cercle Brugge
- 2004–2005: Antwerp
- 2005–2006: Wevelgem City
- 2006–2007: SC Blankenberge
- 2007–2011: BS Poperinge
- 2011–: Bredene
- 2014: Cercle Brugge (assistant)
- 2018-2019: Diksmuide
- 2021: Bredene (Women)
- * Club domestic league appearances and goals as of 27 August 2007 ‡ National team caps and goals as of 27 August 2008

Jerko Tipurić (born 14 June 1960 in Konjic) is a Croatian retired football defender and football manager. He also has Belgian nationality since 1998.

He is known as a somewhat eccentric person. For example, he taught his players in which angle they had to look when they were dribbling the ball and he let his players wear special shoes during training to strengthen their back muscles. He also controlled the urine of his players. Tipurić even made it to één-television program Man Bijt Hond with his special attention for these details. For the 2006-07 football season in Belgium, he was an analyst for the één-program Studio 1.

== Managerial career ==
Tipurić' main successes as manager were the 1996 Belgian Cup final and the 2002 second division championship, both as manager of Cercle Brugge. Also particular about his managerial career is the fact that he does not mind to train lower league teams when he receives no interest from professional clubs. Tipurić took charge at RC Zuid-West-Vlaanderen in 2001 and at Wevelgem City in 2005 and later was manager of BS Poperinge, playing in the highest level of West Flanders. That is the fifth level in Belgian football, just under the lowest nationwide division. He promoted with Poperinge in 2009 to 4th division. With BS Poperinge, Tipurić survived the battle against relegation in their first season, the second season was more relaxed. His contract was not renewed however because the board felt that it was time for a change.

Tipurić rejoined Cercle in October 2014 as assistant to manager Arnar Viðarsson. He also coached Diksmuide and in December 2021, Tipurić left the women's team of SV Bredene after only three months at the helm.
