= Dragi Setinov =

Macedonian footballer

Personal information
- Full name: Dragan Setinov
- Date of birth: 13 February 1961 (age 65)
- Place of birth: Skopje, Macedonia
- Position: Defender

Senior career*
Years	Team	Apps	(Gls)
1981–1982	Pobeda	27	(1)
1982–1986	Vardar	117	(14)
1986–1991	Hajduk Split	106	(3)
1991–1992	Ethnikos Piraeus	15	(2)
Total		265	(20)

Managerial career
- 2000: Vardar
- 2009–2010: Vardar (technical director)
- 2010–2011: Vardar (president)
- 2011–2012: Teteks
- 2013: Lokomotiva Skopje
- * Club domestic league appearances and goals

Dragi Setinov (Macedonian: Дpaги Ceтинoв; born 13 February 1961) is a Macedonian retired football player who played for FK Pobeda, Hajduk Split, FK Vardar and Ethnikos Asteras.

== Achievements ==
Macedonian Championship

- Pobeda Prilep
- 1981
