= Goran Vučević =

Croatian footballer and manager

Personal information
- Date of birth: 18 May 1971 (age 55)
- Place of birth: Split, SR Croatia, SFR Yugoslavia
- Height: 1.83 m (6 ft 0 in)
- Position: Midfielder

Senior career*
Years	Team	Apps	(Gls)
1988–1992	Hajduk Split	68	(16)
1992–1997	Barcelona B	63	(10)
1992–1997	Barcelona	13	(0)
1994–1995	→ Hajduk Split (loan)	16	(3)
1995–1996	→ Mérida (loan)	11	(0)
1997–1999	1. FC Köln	16	(1)
1999–2001	Hajduk Split	12	(0)
Total		190	(30)

International career
1992	Croatia	3	(0)

Managerial career
- 2005–2008: Hajduk Split (assistant)
- 2008: Hajduk Split
- 2010: Hajduk Split (interim)
- 2010–2011: Hajduk Split
- 2015–2016: Hajduk Split (interim)
- 2017–2020: Barcelona (scout)
- 2021–2023: Al Nassr (sporting director)
- 2024–: Hajduk Split (sporting director)
- * Club domestic league appearances and goals

Goran Vučević (born 18 May 1971) is a Croatian former professional footballer who played as a central midfielder.

He spent most of his professional career with Hajduk Split (in several capacities, including player and manager) and Barcelona (mostly with the reserves).

== Club career ==
Born in Split, Yugoslavia, Vučević started his career at local HNK Hajduk, where he became a key player at only 18, eventually winning the 1992 Sportske novosti Yellow Shirt award, issued to the best footballer playing in the Croatian League at the end of every season.

Afterwards, Vučević was bought by Johan Cruyff's FC Barcelona. During his five-year stay, he could never break into the first team, which also featured – as the clubs in Spain were not allowed to field more than three foreign players at the same time – Luís Figo, Gheorghe Hagi, Ronald Koeman, Michael Laudrup, Romário or Hristo Stoichkov; in December 1993, he was ousted from the squad by the Dutch manager after refusing to return to the B-side, and in the following off-season was loaned to Hajduk, where alongside experienced players such as Stjepan Andrijašević, Aljoša Asanović and Igor Štimac he helped to a double conquest – the first since 1975 – and a quarter-final run in the UEFA Champions League.

After two loans, first loaned to his former club then CP Mérida, the latter also in La Liga, Vučević was finally sold in the 1997 summer to 1. FC Köln. He also struggled immensely in Germany, playing very rarely including when the team was in the second division. In 1999, he returned for a third spell with Hajduk, retiring after two unassuming years.

== International career ==
Over the course of one week, starting on 5 July 1992, Vučević played three times for the Croatia national team. All of his caps were won in friendlies against the same opponent, Australia.

== Managerial career ==
From 2005 to 2008, still with Hajduk Split, Vučević accumulated the tasks of assistant to the main squad and youth coach, taking the first team's reins in May 2008 but resigning in October, after which he returned to the youth system. His second spell as manager started on 16 November 2010, when he replaced Stanko Poklepović; in April 2011, having already been ousted from the group stage of the UEFA Europa League and having failed to win the national championship during the club's 100-year celebration season, he was sacked.

Vučević returned to Hajduk Split in December 2013 as director of football, thanks to president Marin Brbić. In April 2015, he again replaced Poklepović for a third spell as head coach, but was himself relieved of his duties after only two games, one of them resulting in elimination from the Croatian Football Cup at the hands of RNK Split. He received threats to both him and his family from the fans, but continued to work as sporting director afterwards; in March 2016, he was criticised for his methods and blamed for the team's negative run in the league, offering his resignation which was taken into consideration.

On 1 April 2016, Vučević resigned from Hajduk after Brbić left his post. He then became a scout for former club Barcelona.

He signed a two-year deal as technical director at Saudi Arabia's Al Nassr in October 2021.
