= Dragutin Ćelić =

Croatian footballer (born 1962)

Personal information
- Date of birth: 19 August 1962 (age 64)
- Place of birth: Imotski, FPR Yugoslavia
- Height: 1.75 m (5 ft 9 in)
- Positions: Midfielder; defender

Senior career*
Years	Team	Apps	(Gls)
1981–1982	Solin	45	(6)
1983–1990	Hajduk Split	223	(22)
1991–1992	Hertha BSC	17	(1)
1992–1993	Carl Zeiss Jena	22	(0)
1993–1994	TV Hardheim		
1994–1995	FC Linz	15	(0)
–2000	Split		

International career
1990	Croatia XI	2	(0)
1993	Croatia	1	(0)
- * Club domestic league appearances and goals

Dragutin "Drago" Ćelić (born 19 August 1962) is a Croatian retired professional footballer.

== International career ==
Čelić made his debut for Croatia in an October 1990 friendly match against the United States and earned a total of 3 caps scoring no goals. His final international was a June 1993 friendly against Ukraine. The first two matches were unofficial since Croatia was still part of Yugoslavia at that time.
