= Croatia national football team results (1992–1999) =

This is a list of the Croatia national football team results from the country's independence in 1991 to 1999.

The first match of the modern Republic of Croatia, against Australia, took place in Melbourne in 1992.

Croatia's first ever competitive matches were in the qualification for UEFA Euro 1996. The team went on to qualify for the final tournament and reached the quarter-finals there.

It then qualified for the 1998 FIFA World Cup finals, where it finished third and won the bronze medals, which was followed by its first ever unsuccessful qualifying campaign, the UEFA Euro 2000 qualifying.

== Key ==
Win
Draw
Loss

As per statistical convention in football, matches decided in extra time are counted as wins and losses, while matches decided by penalty shoot-outs are counted as draws.

== By year ==
In the modern era, the nation played three matches shortly before its independence from Yugoslavia, listed at Croatia national football team results (1940–91).

=== 1992 ===
5 July 1992 Friendly	Australia	1–0	Croatia	Melbourne, Australia
	Van Blerk (yellow card) 43'; Marth 62'; Petersen (yellow card) 84'	Report	Miše (yellow card) 55'; Jeličić (red card) 65'; Biškup (yellow card) 86'	Stadium: Olympic Park Stadium; Attendance: 15,000; Referee: John Fraser (Australia); Assistant referees: Eugene Brazzale (Australia); John Hogg (Australia)

8 July 1992 Friendly	Australia	3–1	Croatia	Adelaide, Australia
	Tapai 10'; Spink 14'; Stewart (yellow card) 21'; Van Blerk 81'	Report	Štimac (yellow card) 20' (yellow card) 75' (red card); Weber 31'; Špehar (yellow card) 62'; S. Bilić (yellow card) 67'	Stadium: Hindmarsh Stadium; Attendance: 5,000; Referee: Tom McRoe (Australia); Assistant referees: Mike Ingham (Australia); Tony Martelli (Australia)

12 July 1992 Friendly	Australia	0–0	Croatia	Sydney, Australia
		Report	Vučević (yellow card) 64' (red card) 74'; S. Bilić (yellow card) 80'	Stadium: Sydney Football Stadium; Attendance: 12,735; Referee: Gary Power (Australia); Assistant referees: Gordon Dunster (Australia); Manuel Loupis (Australia)

22 October 1992 Friendly	Croatia	3–0	Mexico	Zagreb, Croatia
	Šuker 43' (pen.), 87'; Računica 82'	Report	Campos (yellow card) 36'; Hernández (yellow card) 72'	Stadium: Stadion Maksimir; Attendance: 40,000; Referee: Antal Huták (Hungary); Assistant referees: László Molnár (Hungary); Lajos Németh (Hungary)

=== 1993 ===
25 June 1993 Friendly	Croatia	3–1	Ukraine	Zagreb, Croatia
	Šuker 13'; Adžić 47'; Bičanić 83'	Report	Diryavka (yellow card) 38'; Husin 57'; Pokhlebayev (yellow card) 84'	Stadium: Stadion Maksimir; Attendance: 26,070; Referee: Darko Jamšek (Slovenia); Assistant referees: Antun Beton (Slovenia); Žarko Vidali (Slovenia)

=== 1994 ===
23 March 1994 Friendly	Spain	0–2	Croatia	Valencia, Spain
		Report	Prosinečki 6'; Šuker 51' (yellow card) 72'; Jerkan (yellow card) 58'; Mornar (yellow card) 75'	Stadium: Luis Casanova Stadium; Attendance: 40,000; Referee: Gilles Veissière (France); Assistant referees: Jean-Yves Tas (France); Jacques Baud (France)

20 April 1994 Friendly	Slovakia	4–1	Croatia	Bratislava, Slovakia
	Dubovský 17' (pen.), 60' (pen.); Kinder 68'; Moravčík 84'	Report	Toplak (yellow card) 14'; Miše (yellow card) 34'; Popović 65'	Stadium: Tehelné pole Attendance: 6,511; Referee: Sándor Puhl (Hungary); Assistant referees: Imre Bozóky (Hungary); Miklós Fekete (Hungary)

18 May 1994 Friendly	Hungary	2–2	Croatia	Győr, Hungary
	Keresztúri 51', 73'; Kovacs (yellow card) 40'; Halmai (yellow card) 53'	Report	Mladenović 52', 62'; Jerkan (yellow card) 20'	Stadium: FC Raba ETO; Attendance: 5,000; Referee: Lubomír Puček (Czech Republic); Assistant referees: Otakar Draštík (Czech Republic); Bohuslav Legierský (Czech Republic)

4 June 1994 Friendly	Croatia	0–0	Argentina	Zagreb, Croatia
		Report	Batistuta (yellow card) 20'; Ruggeri (yellow card) 88'; Cáceres (yellow card) 89'	Stadium: Stadion Maksimir; Attendance: 40,000; Referee: Gerd Grabher (Austria); Assistant referees: Eugen Bereuter (Austria); Franz Pikner (Austria)

17 August 1994 Friendly	Israel	0–4	Croatia	Ramat Gan, Israel
		Report	Cvitanović 3', 34'; Jurčević 53'; Mumlek 89'	Stadium: Ramat Gan Stadium; Attendance: 5,000; Referee: Daud Suhil (Israel); Assistant referees: Erez Zatelman (Israel); Gideon Zhur (Israel)

4 September 1994 Euro 1996 qualif, Gr 4	Estonia	0–2	Croatia	Tallinn, Estonia
	Alonen (yellow card) 37'	Report	Šuker 45', 69'; Štimac (yellow card) 69'	Stadium: Kadriorg Stadium; Attendance: 2,000; Referee: Václav Krondl (Czech Republic); Assistant referees: Josef Zvonič (Czech Republic); Otakar Draštík (Czech Republic); Fourth official: Karel Bohuněk (Czech Republic)

9 October 1994 Euro 1996 qualif, Gr 4	Croatia	2–0	Lithuania	Zagreb, Croatia
	Jerkan (yellow card) 12' (goal) 56'; Jurčević (yellow card) 20'; Mladenović (yellow card) 32'; Kozniku 80'	Report	Žuta (yellow card) 3'; Staučė (yellow card) 42'; Sukristov (yellow card) 55'	Stadium: Stadion Maksimir; Attendance: 15,000; Referee: Alfred Wieser (Austria); Assistant referees: Manfred Zeiszer (Austria); Wolfgang Heidenreich (Austria); Fourth official: Robert Sedlacek (Austria)

16 November 1994 Euro 1996 qualif, Gr 4	Italy	1–2	Croatia	Palermo, Italy
	Costacurta (yellow card) 67'; D. Baggio 89'	Report	Jarni (yellow card) 1'; Šuker 32', 57'; Boban (yellow card) 66'; Štimac (yellow card) 81'	Stadium: Stadio Renzo Barbera; Attendance: 40,000; Referee: Joël Quiniou (France); Assistant referees: Charles Monnier (France); Fourth official: Marc Batta (France)

=== 1995 ===
25 March 1995 Euro 1996 qualif, Gr 4	Croatia	4–0	Ukraine	Zagreb, Croatia
	Boban 13'; Šuker 20', 80'; Jerkan (yellow card) 51'; Jurčević (yellow card) 65'; Prosinečki 71' (pen.)	Report	Telesnenko (yellow card) 40'; Tyapushkin (yellow card) 70'	Stadium: Stadion Maksimir; Attendance: 25,000; Referee: Hans-Jürgen Weber (Germany); Assistant referees: Klaus Plettenberg (Germany); Hans Wolf (Germany); Fourth official: Jürgen Aust (Germany)

29 March 1995 Euro 1996 qualif, Gr 4	Lithuania	0–0	Croatia	Vilnius, Lithuania
	Šuika (yellow card) 31'	Report	Prosinečki (yellow card) 12'; Pavličić (yellow card) 27'; Asanović (yellow card) 45'	Stadium: Žalgiris Stadium; Attendance: 10,000; Referee: Keith W. Burge (Wales); Assistant referees: John Martin Richard Evans (Wales); Colin Jones (Wales); Fourth official: Brian Lawlor (Wales)

26 April 1995 Euro 1996 qualif, Gr 4	Croatia	2–0	Slovenia	Zagreb, Croatia
	Ladić (red card) 11'; Prosinečki 15' (yellow card) 80'; Štimac (yellow card) 19'; Šuker (yellow card) 66' (goal) 85'	Report	Englaro (yellow card) 13'; Židan (red card) 79'	Stadium: Stadion Maksimir; Attendance: 20,000; Referee: Oğuz Sarvan (Turkey); Assistant referees: Akif Uğurdur (Turkey); Münir Takpak (Turkey)

11 June 1995 Euro 1996 qualif, Gr 4	Ukraine	1–0	Croatia	Kyiv, Ukraine
	Kalitvintsev 13'; Pokhlebayev (yellow card) 45'; Horilyi (yellow card) 74'	Report	Pavličić (yellow card) 18'; Gabrić (red card) 28'	Stadium: Respublikansky Stadion; Attendance: 5,000; Referee: Kurt Röthlisberger (Switzerland); Assistant referees: Marc Morandi (Switzerland); Mauro Bianchi (Switzerland); Fourth official: Andreas Schluchter (Switzerland)

3 September 1995 Euro 1996 qualif, Gr 4	Croatia	7–1	Estonia	Zagreb, Croatia
	Mladenović 3'; Šuker 19', 58', 88'; Bokšić 29'; Boban 41'; Štimac 80'; Jarni (yellow card) 81'	Report	Reim 16'; Kristal (yellow card) 18'; Olumets (yellow card) 65'	Stadium: Stadion Maksimir; Attendance: 20,000; Referee: Aron Huzu (Romania); Assistant referees: Dan Ologeanu (Romania); Patrițiu Abrudan (Romania); Fourth official: Constantin Gheorghe N. (Romania)

8 October 1995 Euro 1996 qualif, Gr 4	Croatia	1–1	Italy	Split, Croatia
	Jurčević (yellow card) 3'; Asanović (yellow card) 16'; Štimac (yellow card) 19'; Šuker 48' (pen.); Pavličić (yellow card) 66'; Boban (yellow card) 73'	Report	Bucci (red card) 9'; Albertini 29'; Maldini (yellow card) 37'; Toldo (yellow card) 47'	Stadium: Stadion Poljud; Attendance: 35,000; Referee: Jaap Uilenberg (Netherlands); Assistant referees: Berend Talens (Netherlands); Ronald Kloeg (Netherlands)

15 November 1995 Euro 1996 qualif, Gr 4	Slovenia	1–2	Croatia	Ljubljana, Slovenia
	Gliha 35'; Udovič (yellow card) 50'; Englaro (yellow card) 65'	Report	Šuker 40' (pen.); Jurčević 54'; Pralija (yellow card) 63'	Stadium: Bežigrad Stadium; Attendance: 8,000; Referee: Guy Goethals (Belgium); Assistant referees: Léopold Driessen (Belgium); Marc Van den Broeck (Belgium)

=== 1996 ===
28 February 1996 Friendly	Croatia	2–1	Poland	Rijeka, Croatia
	Boban (yellow card) 7'; Brajković 23'; Asanović (yellow card) 45'; Cvitanović 89'	Report	Bałuszyński (yellow card) 10' (goal) 18'; Woźniak (yellow card) 67'	Stadium: Stadion Kantrida; Attendance: 10,000; Referee: Milan Mitrovič (Slovenia); Assistant referees: Josip Jakopiček (Slovenia); Darko Horvat (Slovenia)

13 March 1996 Friendly	Croatia	3–0	South Korea	Zagreb, Croatia
	Vlaović 24', 43', 63'; Jurčević (yellow card) 18'	Report		Stadium: Stadion Kranjčevićeva; Attendance: 3,000; Referee: Sašo Lazarevski (Macedonia); Assistant referees: Mile Stojčevski (Macedonia); Nikola Bogoevski (Macedonia)

29 March 1996 Friendly	Croatia	2–0	Israel	Varaždin, Croatia
	Rapaić (yellow card) 30'; Pavličić (yellow card) 52'; Štimac 74'; Vlaović 76'	Report		Stadium: Stadion Varteks; Attendance: 6,000; Referee: Vencel Tóth (Hungary); Assistant referees: András Hrabovszky (Hungary); Sándor Szilágyi (Hungary)

10 April 1996 Friendly	Croatia	4–1	Hungary	Osijek, Croatia
	Brajković 6'; Šuker 23'; Pamić 65'; Stanić 75'	Report	Nagy 39'	Stadium: Stadion Gradski vrt Attendance: 15,000; Referee: Bohdan Benedik (Slovakia); Assistant referees: Ján Fašung (Slovakia); Igor Šramka (Slovakia)

24 April 1996 Friendly	England	0–0	Croatia	London, England
	Sheringham (yellow card) 45'; Pearce (yellow card) 59'	Report	Pavličić (yellow card) 28'; Asanović (yellow card) 43'	Stadium: Wembley Stadium; Attendance: 33,650; Referee: Zbigniew Przesmycki (Poland); Assistant referees: Zbigniew Urbańczyk (Poland); Sławomir Żyjewski (Poland)

2 June 1996 Friendly	Republic of Ireland	2–2	Croatia	Dublin, Republic of Ireland
	O'Neill 24'; O'Brien (yellow card) 70'; Quinn 90'	Report	Šuker 14'; Boban 45'	Stadium: Lansdowne Road; Attendance: 30,000; Referee: Philippe Leduc (France); Assistant referees: Rémy Kremer (France); Michael Lebourveilec (France)

11 June 1996 Euro 1996, Gr D	Turkey	0–1	Croatia	Nottingham, England
	Kafkas (yellow card) 31'	Report	Asanović (yellow card) 40'; Boban (yellow card) 55'; Vlaović 86'; Soldo (yellow card) 90'	Stadium: City Ground; Attendance: 22,460; Referee: Serge Muhmenthaler (Switzerland); Assistant referees: Ernst Felder (Switzerland); Martin Freiburghaus (Switzerland); Fourth official: Urs Meier (Switzerland)

16 June 1996 Euro 1996, Gr D	Croatia	3–0	Denmark	Sheffield, England
	Stanić (yellow card) 20'; Prosinečki (yellow card) 23'; Vlaović (yellow card) 39'; Šuker 53' (pen.), 89'; Boban 84'	Report		Stadium: Hillsborough Stadium; Attendance: 33,671; Referee: Marc Batta (France); Assistant referees: Pierre Ufrasi (France); Jacques Mas (France); Fourth official: Alain Sars (France)

19 June 1996 Euro 1996, Gr D	Croatia	0–3	Portugal	Nottingham, England
	Jarni (yellow card) 30'; Pavličić (yellow card) 36'; Pamić (yellow card) 10'	Report	Figo 4'; Pinto 33'; Domingos 82'	Stadium: City Ground; Attendance: 20,484; Referee: Bernd Heynemann (Germany); Assistant referees: Hans Wolf (Germany); Harald Sather (Germany); Fourth official: Hartmut Strampe (Germany)

23 June 1996 Euro 1996, quarterfinal	Croatia	1–2	Germany	Manchester, England,
	Štimac (yellow card) 17' (yellow-red card) 56'; Šuker 51'	Report	Sammer (yellow card) 5' (goal) 59'; Klinsmann (yellow card) 7' (goal) 20' (pen.)	Stadium: Old Trafford; Attendance: 43,412; Referee: Leif Sundell (Sweden); Assistant referees: Kenneth Petersson (Sweden); Mikael Hansson (Sweden); Fourth official: Karl-Erik Nilsson (Sweden)

8 October 1996 1998 World Cup qualif, Gr 1	Bosnia and Herzegovina	1–4	Croatia	Bologna, Italy
	Konjić (yellow card) 3'; Geca (yellow card) 9'; Salihamidžić 23'; Teljigović (yellow card) 27'; Halilović (yellow card) 68'	Report	Bilić 12'; Jurčević (yellow card) 16'; Vlaović 31'; Jarni (yellow card) 49'; Bokšić 63', 85'	Stadium: Stadio Renato Dall'Ara; Attendance: 2,000; Referee: Atanas Uzunov (Bulgaria); Assistant referees: Ivan Lekov (Bulgaria); Yordan Yordanov (Bulgaria)

10 November 1996 1998 World Cup qualif, Gr 1	Croatia	1–1	Greece	Zagreb, Croatia
	Stanić (yellow card) 25'; Šuker (yellow card) 27' (goal) 45'; Bilić (yellow card) 80'; Boban (yellow card) 83'	Report	Nikolaidis 9'; Konstantinidis (yellow card) 21'; Dabizas (yellow card) 50'; Donis (yellow card) 58'; Apostolakis (yellow card) 65'; Kasapis (yellow card) 72'	Stadium: Stadion Maksimir; Attendance: 30,000; Referee: Mario van der Ende (Netherlands); Assistant referees: Gerrard Hunders (Netherlands); Enien Tillen (Netherlands)

11 December 1996 1996 King Hassan II Cup	Morocco	2–2 (6–7 p)	Croatia	Casablanca, Morocco
	Bassir 21'; Bouyboud (red card) 40'; Azzouzi (yellow card) 63'; Bahja 72'	Report	Vlaović 15', 16'; Jerkan (yellow card) 35'; Asanović (red card) 40'; Prosinečki (red card) 70'	Stadium: Stade Mohammed V Attendance: 80,000; Referee: Abdelhamid Reduane (Egypt); Assistant referees: Said Belqola (Morocco); Abdelaziz Dahbi (Morocco)
	Penalties
	Khalif (penalty scored); Raghib (penalty missed); Ouakili (penalty missed); El Khalej (penalty scored); Bahja (penalty missed); Naybet (penalty scored); Hadji (penalty scored); Azzouzi (penalty scored); Rossi (penalty scored); El Brazi (penalty missed)		(penalty missed) Špehar; (penalty missed) Pamić; (penalty missed) Mamić; (penalty scored) Soldo; (penalty scored) Ladić; (penalty scored) Kovač; (penalty scored) Jurčević; (penalty scored) Pavličić; (penalty scored) Jerkan; (penalty scored) Špehar

12 December 1996 1996 King Hassan II Cup	Croatia	1–1 (4–1 p)	Czech Republic	Casablanca, Morocco
	Pralija 29'; Štimac (yellow card) 43'; Prosinečki (yellow card) 71'	Report	Drulák 4'; Kubík (yellow card) 56' (yellow card) 77' (red card)	Stadium: Stade Mohammed V Attendance: 20,000; Referee: Said Belqola (Morocco); Assistant referees: Abdelaziz Dahbi (Morocco); Driss Rihani (Morocco)
	Penalties
	Prosinečki (penalty scored); Asanović (penalty scored); Jarni (penalty scored); Vlaović (penalty scored)		(penalty scored) Drulák; (penalty missed) Čížek; (penalty missed) Bejbl

=== 1997 ===
29 March 1997 1998 World Cup qualif, Gr 1	Croatia	1–1	Denmark	Split, Croatia
	Soldo (yellow card) 35'; Šuker (yellow card) 48' (goal) 50'	Report	Frandsen (yellow card) 32'; Helveg (yellow card) 45'; Laudrup 83'; Schjønberg (yellow card) 90'	Stadium: Stadion Poljud; Attendance: 35,000; Referee: Piero Ceccarini (Italy); Assistant referees: Mauro Fiori (Italy); Donato Nicoletti (Italy)

2 April 1997 1998 World Cup qualif, Gr 1	Croatia	3–3	Slovenia	Split, Croatia
	Prosinečki 33'; Šimić (yellow card) 35'; Boban 43', 60'; Šuker (yellow card) 48' (goal) 50'	Report	Gajser (yellow card) 19'; Srebrnič (yellow card) 30'; Zahovič (yellow card) 35'; Gliha 44', 65', 67'	Stadium: Stadion Poljud; Attendance: 20,000; Referee: Paul Durkin (England); Assistant referees: David Mark Horlick (England); William Michael Jordan (England)

30 April 1997 1998 World Cup qualif, Gr 1	Greece	0–1	Croatia	Thessaloniki, Greece
	Kasapis (yellow card) 32'	Report	Soldo (yellow card) 17'; Jurić (yellow card) 41'; Šuker 74'	Stadium: Kaftanzoglio Stadium; Attendance: 35,000; Referee: Antonio Jesús López Nieto (Spain); Assistant referees: Victoriano Giráldez Carrasco (Spain); Carlos Martín Nieto (Spain)

8 June 1997 1997 Kirin Cup	Japan	4–3	Croatia	Tokyo, Japan
	Hirano 34'; Miura 49', 53'; Nanami (yellow card) 59'; Honda (yellow card) 64'; Akita (yellow card) 85'; Morishima 89'	Report	Pavličić (yellow card) 30'; Jurčić (yellow card) 76'; Asanović 77', 86' (pen.); Vlaović 90+3'	Stadium: Kokuritsu-Kyogijo; Attendance: 50,164; Referee: Tae Young Kim (South Korea); Assistant referees: Hee Wook Kim (South Korea); J.K. Park (South Korea)

12 June 1997 1997 Kirin Cup	Turkey	1–1	Croatia	Sendai, Japan
	İnceefe (yellow card) 26'; Sağlam 71'	Report	Erceg 21'; Prosinečki (yellow card) 72'; Mumlek (yellow card) 75'	Stadium: Yurtec Stadium Sendai; Attendance: 15,687; Referee: Masayoshi Okada (Japan); Assistant referees: Yoshikazu Hiroshima (Japan); Noboru Ishiyama (Japan)

6 September 1997 1998 World Cup qualif, Gr 1	Croatia	3–2	Bosnia and Herzegovina	Zagreb, Croatia
	Bilić 27'; Marić 41'; Jurčić (yellow card) 76'; Boban 80'	Report	Ladić 17' (o.g.); Salihamidžić 55'; Halilović (yellow card) 58'; Beširević (yellow card) 77'	Stadium: Stadion Maksimir; Attendance: 30,000; Referee: Hugh Dallas (Scotland); Assistant referees: Robert Orr (Scotland); John McElhinney (Scotland)

10 September 1997 1998 World Cup qualif, Gr 1	Denmark	3–1	Croatia	Copenhagen, Denmark
	B. Laudrup 15' (yellow card) 62'; M. Laudrup 34'; Molnar 40'; Frandsen (yellow card) 45' (yellow card) 73' (red card)	Report	Šuker 44' (yellow card) 54'; Soldo (yellow card) 65'; Jarni (yellow card) 72'	Stadium: Parken Stadium; Attendance: 41,381; Referee: Sándor Puhl (Hungary); Assistant referees: Imre Bozóky (Hungary); Béla Mező (Hungary)

11 October 1997 1998 World Cup qualif, Gr 1	Slovenia	1–3	Croatia	Ljubljana, Slovenia
	Novak (yellow card) 29'; Zahovič (yellow card) 30' (goal) 72'; Gajser (yellow card) 43'; Karić (yellow card) 57'	Report	Šuker 11'; Soldo (yellow card) 31' (goal) 39'; Bokšić 50'; Kovač (yellow card) 90'	Stadium: Bežigrad Stadium; Attendance: 5,000; Referee: Armand Ancion (Belgium); Assistant referees: Marc Van den Broeck (Belgium); Marcel Malach (Belgium)

29 October 1997 1998 World Cup qualif, play-off	Croatia	2–0	Ukraine	Zagreb, Croatia
	Bilić 11' (yellow card) 90'; Stanić (yellow card) 30'; Vlaović 40'	Report	Maksymov (yellow card) 12'	Stadium: Stadion Maksimir; Attendance: 20,000; Referee: Alain Sars (France); Assistant referees: Pierre Renaudin (France); Michel Bourlevach (France)

15 November 1997 1998 World Cup qualif, play-off	Ukraine	1–1 (1–3 agg.)	Croatia	Kyiv, Ukraine
	Shevchenko 4'	Report	Asanović (yellow card) 7'; Soldo (yellow card) 12'; Bokšić 27'	Stadium: Olimpiyskyi National Sports Complex; Attendance: 70,000; Referee: Rune Pedersen (Norway); Assistant referees: Erik Roestad (Norway); Bernard Oerebo (Norway)

=== 1998 ===
22 April 1998 Friendly	Croatia	4–1	Poland	Osijek, Croatia
	Boban 6'; Stanić 21', 43'; Bokšić 47'; Šuker (yellow card) 67'	Report	Ratajczyk 67'	Stadium: Stadion Gradski vrt Attendance: 20,000; Referee: Vencel Tóth (Hungary); Assistant referees: László Varga (Hungary); István Vad (Hungary)

29 May 1998 Friendly	Croatia	1–2	Slovakia	Pula, Croatia
	Prosinečki (yellow card) 30'; Vlaović 43'; Asanović (yellow card) 45'; Kozniku (yellow card) 81'	Report	Jančula 4' (yellow card) 45'; Moravčík (yellow card) 31'; Sovič (yellow card) 53'; Majoroš 58'	Stadium: Stadion Aldo Drosina; Attendance: 7,000; Referee: Milan Mitrovič (Slovenia); Assistant referees: Žarko Vidali (Slovenia); Zoran Novalič (Slovenia)

3 June 1998 Friendly	Croatia	2–0	Iran	Rijeka, Croatia
	Prosinečki 30'; Jurčić (yellow card) 61'; Marić (yellow card) 73'; Šuker 77'; Mrmić (yellow card) 82'	Report	Daei (yellow card) 28'; Bagheri (yellow card) 63'	Stadium: Stadion Kantrida; Attendance: 10,000; Referee: Fiorenzo Treosi (Italy); Assistant referees: Sergio Zuccolini (Italy); Luigi Medeot (Italy)

6 June 1998 Friendly	Croatia	7–0	Australia	Zagreb, Croatia
	Šuker 14' (pen.), 37', 64' (pen.); Prosinečki 40'; Boban 47', 83'; Šerić (yellow card) 73'; Kozniku 74'	Report	Kalac (yellow card) 14'; Spiteri (yellow card) 79'	Stadium: Stadion Maksimir; Attendance: 12,000; Referee: Gerd Grabher (Austria); Assistant referees: Eugen Bereuter (Austria); Markus Mayr (Austria)

14 June 1998 1998 World Cup, Gr H	Jamaica	1–3	Croatia	Lens, France
	Earle 45'; Burton (yellow card) 62'	Report	Soldo (yellow card) 5'; Stanić 27'; Prosinečki 53'; Šimić (yellow card) 59'; Šuker 69'	Stadium: Stade Felix-Bollaert; Attendance: 38,100; Referee: Vítor Melo Pereira (Portugal); Assistant referees: Nicolae Grigorescu (Romania); Jacques Poudevigne (France); Fourth official: Bernd Heynemann (Germany)

20 June 1998 1998 World Cup, Gr H	Japan	0–1	Croatia	Nantes, France
	Nanami (yellow card) 41'; Nakanishi (yellow card) 70'; Akita (yellow card) 89'	Report	Prosinečki (yellow card) 26'; Šuker 77'; Stanić (yellow card) 83'	Stadium: Stade de la Beaujoire; Attendance: 35,500; Referee: Ramesh Ramdhan (Trinidad and Tobago); Assistant referees: Merere Gonzales (Trinidad and Tobago); Achmat Salie (South Africa); Fourth official: Günter Benkö (Austria)

26 June 1998 1998 World Cup, Gr H	Argentina	1–0	Croatia	Bordeaux, France
	Ortega (yellow card) 23'; Ayala (yellow card) 35'; Pineda 36'; Vivas (yellow card) 68'	Report	Bilić (yellow card) 20'; Soldo (yellow card) 43'; Boban (yellow card) 47'; Jarni (yellow card) 58'	Stadium: Stade du Parc Lescure; Attendance: 31,800; Referee: Said Belqola (Morocco); Assistant referees: Aristidis Chris Soldatos (South Africa); Mohamed Mansri (Tunisia); Fourth official: Lim Kee Chong (Mauritius)

30 June 1998 1998 World Cup, Round of 16	Romania	0–1	Croatia	Bordeaux, France
	Popescu (yellow card) 43'; Petrescu (yellow card) 70'; Ilie (yellow card) 81'	Report	Boban (yellow card) 27'; Šuker 45+2' (pen.); Bilić (yellow card) 70'	Stadium: Stade du Parc Lescure; Attendance: 31,800; Referee: Javier Castrilli (Argentina); Assistant referees: Claudio Rossi (Argentina); Arnaldo Pinto (Brazil); Fourth official: Lim Kee Chong (Mauritius)

4 July 1998 1998 World Cup, quarterfinal	Germany	0–3	Croatia	Lyon, France
	Heinrich (yellow card) 18'; Tarnat (yellow card) 37'; Wörns (red card) 40'	Report	Šimić (yellow card) 13'; Jarni 45+3'; Vlaović 80'; Šuker 85' (yellow card) 57'	Stadium: Stade de Gerland; Attendance: 39,100; Referee: Rune Pedersen (Norway); Assistant referees: Marc Van den Broeck (Belgium); Mikael Nilsson (Sweden); Fourth official: Urs Meier (Switzerland)

8 July 1998 1998 World Cup, semifinal	France	2–1	Croatia	Saint-Denis, France
	Thuram 47', 70'; Blanc (red card) 76'	Report	Asanović (yellow card) 45'; Šuker 46'; Stanić (yellow card) 75'; Šimić (yellow card) 88'	Stadium: Stade de France; Attendance: 76,000; Referee: José María García-Aranda (Spain); Assistant referees: Fernando Tresaco Gracia (Spain); Jorge Arango (Colombia); Fourth official: Epifanio González (Paraguay)

11 July 1998 1998 World Cup, 3rd place match	Netherlands	1–2	Croatia	Paris, France
	Zenden 22'; Davids (yellow card) 89'; Jonk (yellow card) 89'	Report	Prosinečki 14'; Jurčić (yellow card) 34'; Šuker 36'; Štimac (yellow card) 52'; Asanović (yellow card) 69'; Stanić (yellow card) 74'	Stadium: Parc des Princes; Attendance: 45,500; Referee: Epifanio González (Paraguay); Assistant referees: Emanuel Zammit (Malta); Lencie Fred (Vanuatu); Fourth official: Urs Meier (Switzerland)

5 September 1998 Euro 2000 qualif, Gr 8	Republic of Ireland	2–0	Croatia	Dublin, Republic of Ireland
	Irwin 4' (pen.); Roy Keane 15'; Robbie Keane (yellow card) 33'; Kinsella (yellow card) 35'	Report	Tudor (yellow card) 32'; Stanić (yellow card) 65' (yellow card) 70' (red card); Jurčić (red card) 71'; Pamić (yellow card) 73'	Stadium: Lansdowne Road; Attendance: 34,000; Referee: Vítor Melo Pereira (Portugal); Assistant referees: Carlos Manuel Ferreira Matos (Portugal); José Manuel Silva Cardinal (Portugal)

10 October 1998 Euro 2000 qualif, Gr 8	Malta	1–4	Croatia	Attard, Malta
	Suda 29'; Spiteri (yellow card) 90'	Report	Šuker (yellow card) 10' (goal) 81'; Soldo (yellow card) 28'; Šimić 54'; Vugrinec 68', 74'	Stadium: Ta' Qali; Attendance: 2,000; Referee: Bohdan Benedik (Slovakia); Assistant referees: Ivan Bartoš (Slovakia); Martin Balko (Slovakia); Fourth official: Karol Ihring (Slovakia)

14 October 1998 Euro 2000 qualif, Gr 8	Croatia	3–2	Macedonia	Zagreb, Croatia
	Šuker 16'; Štimac (yellow card) 33'; Asanović (yellow card) 44'; Boban 45', 70'; Tudor (yellow card) 58'; Šarić (yellow card) 76'; Jurčić (yellow card) 82'	Report	Ćirić 2'; Lazarevski (yellow card) 27'; Šainovski 55'; Zaharievski (yellow card) 68'	Stadium: Stadion Maksimir; Attendance: 2,000; Referee: Nikolai Levnikov (Russia); Assistant referees: Mikhail Semyonov (Russia); Sergey Fursa (Russia); Fourth official: Andrei Butenko (Russia)

=== 1999 ===
10 February 1999 Friendly	Croatia	0–1	Denmark	Split, Croatia
	Asanović (yellow card) 30'	Report	Thomsen (yellow card) 22'; Sand 45'	Stadium: Stadion Poljud; Attendance: 7,000; Referee: Gilles Veissière (France); Assistant referees: Phillipe Larose (France); Richard Delorme (France)

10 March 1999 Friendly	Greece	3–2	Croatia	Athens, Greece
	Giannakopoulos 12', 55'; Nikolaidis 86'; Zagorakis (yellow card) 87'	Report	Boban (yellow card) 60'; Vlaović 68'; Šuker 80' (pen.)	Stadium: Spiridon Louis; Attendance: 5,000; Referee: Juan Ansuátegui Roca (Spain); Assistant referees: Carlos Martín Nieto (Spain); Carmelo Miramón Moreno (Spain)

28 April 1999 Friendly	Croatia	0–0	Italy	Zagreb, Croatia
	Vlaović (yellow card) 41'	Report	Albertini (yellow card) 29'; Panucci (yellow card) 35'; Maldini (yellow card) 48'	Stadium: Stadion Maksimir; Attendance: 15,000; Referee: Georg Dardenne (Germany); Assistant referees: Erich Schneider (Germany); Josef Weber (Germany)

5 May 1999 Friendly	Spain	3–1	Croatia	Seville, Spain
	Engonga 34'; Hierro 48' (pen.) (yellow card) 55'; García 84'	Report	Šuker 10'	Stadium: Estadio Olimpico; Attendance: 55,000; Referee: Pierluigi Collina (Italy); Assistant referees: Luca Galvani (Italy); Vincenzo Raiola (Italy)

5 June 1999 Euro 2000 qualif, Gr 8	Macedonia	1–1	Croatia	Skopje, Macedonia
	Trenevski (yellow card) 3'; Šakiri (yellow card) 44'; Babunski (yellow card) 54'; Božinov 81'	Report	Šuker 19'; Šarić (yellow card) 28'; Jarni (yellow card) 85'	Stadium: Gradski stadion Attendance: 10,000; Referee: Hugh Dallas (Scotland); Assistant referees: John McElhinney (Scotland); Robert Marshall Gunn (Scotland); Fourth official: John Rowbotham (Scotland)

13 June 1999 1999 Korea Cup	Croatia	2–2	Egypt	Seoul, South Korea
	I. Cvitanović 45' (pen.); Vugrinec 78'; Bule (yellow card) 88'	Report	H. Hassan 10', 35'; A. Hassan (yellow card) 24'; Sabry (yellow card) 33'; Youssef (yellow card) 44'; I. Hassan (yellow card) 54'	Stadium: Dongdaemun; Attendance: 6,900; Referee: Bong Ki Ahn (South Korea); Assistant referees: Young Chul Lee (South Korea); Chang Ku Kang (South Korea)

16 June 1999 1999 Korea Cup	Croatia	2–1	Mexico	Seoul, South Korea
	Bišćan 44'; M. Cvitanović (yellow card) 55'; J. Šimić 64'	Report	Hernández 26'; Lara (yellow card) 30'; García Aspe (yellow card) 40'; Zepeda (yellow card) 82'	Stadium: Dongdaemun; Attendance: 4,500; Referee: Byung Ho Kang (South Korea); Assistant referees: Young Hyun Chung (South Korea); Hyun Koo Kim (South Korea)

19 June 1999 1999 Korea Cup	South Korea	1–1	Croatia	Seoul, South Korea
	Choi Yoon-yeol 51'; Noh Jung-yoon 58' (yellow card) 59'; Hong Myung-bo (yellow card) 67'	Report	Tomas (yellow card) 21' (goal) 88'; I. Cvitanović (yellow card) 45'; Bišćan (yellow card) 65'; J. Šimić (yellow card) 83'	Stadium: Jamsil; Attendance: 80,000; Referee: Tajaddin Fares (Syria); Assistant referees: Ghadanfari Hussein (Kuwait); Komaleeswaran Sankar (India)

18 August 1999 Euro 2000 qualif, Gr 8	FR Yugoslavia	0–0	Croatia	Belgrade, Yugoslavia
	Mirković (yellow card) 21'; Jokanović (yellow card) 58'	Report	Boban (yellow card) 3'; Jarni (yellow card) 9'; Jurčić (yellow card) 79'	Stadium: Red Star Stadium; Attendance: 48,282; Referee: Kim Milton Nielsen (Denmark); Assistant referees: Henning Knudsen (Denmark); Jens Larsen (Denmark); Fourth official: Jorn West Larsen (Denmark)

21 August 1999 Euro 2000 qualif, Gr 8	Croatia	2–1	Malta	Zagreb, Croatia
	Bišćan (yellow card) 7'; Stanić 34'; Soldo 55'; Vlaović (yellow card) 74'	Report	Saliba (yellow card) 5'; Said (yellow card) 15'; Brincat (yellow card) 31'; Carabott 60'	Stadium: Stadion Maksimir; Attendance: 20,000; Referee: Atanas Uzunov (Bulgaria); Assistant referees: Ivan Lekov (Bulgaria); Yordan Yordanov (Bulgaria); Fourth official: Anton Genov (Bulgaria)

4 September 1999 Euro 2000 qualif, Gr 8	Croatia	1–0	Republic of Ireland	Zagreb, Croatia
	Štimac (yellow card) 86'; Šuker 90'	Report	Carsley (yellow card) 37'; Staunton (yellow card) 44'; McLoughlin (yellow card) 51'; Kilbane (yellow card) 66'	Stadium: Stadion Maksimir; Attendance: 30,000; Referee: Manuel Díaz Vega (Spain); Assistant referees: Fernando Tresaco Gracia (Spain); Rafael Guerrero Alonso (Spain)

9 October 1999 Euro 2000 qualif, Gr 8	Croatia	2–2	FR Yugoslavia	Zagreb, Croatia
	Bokšić 20'; Soldo (yellow card) 29'; Stanić (yellow card) 37' (goal) 47'; Tudor (yellow card) 48'; Jurić (yellow card) 87'	Report	Mijatović 25'; Stanković 31'; Jokanović (yellow card) 36'; Mirković (red card) 41'	Stadium: Stadion Maksimir; Attendance: 30,000; Referee: José María García Aranda (Spain); Assistant referees: Fernando Tresaco Gracia (Spain); Modesto Vázquez Rivero (Spain); Fourth official: Arturo Daudén Ibáñez (Spain)

13 November 1999 Friendly	France	3–0	Croatia	Saint-Denis, France
	Pires 46'; Maurice 67'; Vairelles 73'	Report	Štimac (yellow card) 28'; Soldo (yellow card) 71'	Stadium: Stade de France; Attendance: 74,167; Referee: Ľuboš Micheľ (Slovakia); Assistant referees: Ľubomír Suchý (Slovakia); Vladimír Mušák (Slovakia)

== Record per opponent ==
More wins than losses
As many wins as losses
Fewer wins than losses

Opponent	Pld	W	D	L	GF	GA	GD	Win %
Argentina	2	0	1	1	0	1	−1	0.00
Australia	4	1	1	2	8	4	+4	25.00
Bosnia and Herzegovina	2	2	0	0	7	3	+4	100.00
Brazil	1	0	1	0	1	1	+0	0.00
Czech Republic	1	0	1	0	1	1	+0	0.00
Denmark	4	1	1	2	5	5	+0	25.00
Egypt	1	0	1	0	2	2	+0	0.00
England	1	0	1	0	0	0	+0	0.00
Estonia	2	2	0	0	9	1	+8	100.00
France	2	0	0	2	1	4	−3	0.00
Germany	2	1	0	1	4	2	+2	50.00
Greece	3	1	1	1	4	4	+0	33.33
Hungary	2	1	1	0	6	3	+3	50.00
Iran	1	1	0	0	2	0	+2	100.00
Israel	2	2	0	0	6	0	+6	100.00
Italy	3	1	2	0	3	2	+1	33.33
Jamaica	1	1	0	0	3	1	+2	100.00
Japan	2	1	0	1	4	4	+0	50.00
Lithuania	2	1	1	0	2	0	+2	50.00
Macedonia	2	1	1	0	4	3	+1	50.00
Malta	2	2	0	0	6	2	+4	100.00
Mexico	2	2	0	0	5	1	+4	100.00
Morocco	1	0	1	0	2	2	+0	0.00
Netherlands	1	1	0	0	2	1	+1	100.00
Poland	2	2	0	0	6	2	+4	100.00
Portugal	1	0	0	1	0	3	−3	0.00
Republic of Ireland	3	1	1	1	3	4	−1	33.33
Romania	1	1	0	0	1	0	+1	100.00
Slovakia	2	0	0	2	2	6	−4	0.00
Slovenia	4	3	1	0	10	5	+5	75.00
South Korea	2	1	1	0	4	1	+3	50.00
Spain	2	1	0	1	3	3	+0	50.00
Turkey	2	1	1	0	2	1	+1	50.00
Ukraine	5	3	1	1	10	3	+7	60.00
Yugoslavia	2	0	2	0	2	2	+0	0.00
Total: 34 teams played	72	35	21	16	130	78	+52	48.61
