= 1996 King Hassan II International Cup Tournament =

Tournament details
- Host country: Morocco
- Dates: 11 – 12 December
- Teams: 4
- Venue: 1 (in 1 host city)

Final positions
- Champions: Croatia (1st title)

Tournament statistics
- Matches played: 4
- Goals scored: 11 (2.75 per match)
- Attendance: 255,000 (63,750 per match)
- Top scorer(s): (Morocco) Salaheddine Bassir (Czech Republic) Radek Drulák (Croatia) Goran Vlaović (2 goals)

The 1996 King Hassan II International Cup Tournament was the first edition of this international football competition. It took place on 11 and 12 December 1996 in Morocco. The host nation Morocco, Croatia, Nigeria and Czech Republic participated in the tournament, and all matches took place at the Stade Mohamed V, home of the Moroccan clubs Raja Casablanca and Wydad Casablanca. The tournament was played in a knock out cup format, with only four games played (two semifinals, a final and a third place match).

The inaugural tournament was won by Croatia after prevailing over the Czech Republic in the penalty shoot-out after a 1-1 draw.

== Participating teams ==
- Morocco (host)
- Croatia
- Nigeria
- Czech Republic

== Results ==
Semi-finals
11 December
Morocco	2 (6)
Croatia (pen)	2 (7)
11 December
Czech Republic	2
Nigeria	1

Final
12 December
Croatia (pen)	1 (4)
Czech Republic	1 (1)
Third place
12 December
Morocco	2
Nigeria	0

=== Semifinals ===
11 December 1996

Morocco	2 – 2	Croatia
Bassir 22'; Bahja 72'	Report	Vlaović 14', 15'
Penalties
Khalif (penalty scored); Raghib (penalty missed); Ouakili (penalty missed); El Khalej (penalty scored); Bahja (penalty missed); Naybet (penalty scored); Hadji (penalty scored); Azzouzi (penalty scored); Rossi (penalty scored); El Brazi (penalty missed)	6–7	(penalty missed) Špehar; (penalty missed) Pamić; (penalty missed) Mamić; (penalty scored) Soldo; (penalty scored) Ladić; (penalty scored) Kovač; (penalty scored) Jurčević; (penalty scored) Pavličić; (penalty scored) Jerkan; (penalty scored) Špehar

Stade Mohamed V, Casablanca
Attendance: 80,000
Referee: Abdelhammid Redwan (Egypt)

11 December 1996

Czech Republic	2–1	Nigeria
Drulák 9'; Hašek 79'	Report	Oparaku 87' (pen.)

Stade Mohamed V, Casablanca
Attendance: 80,000
Referee: Abdelhammid Redwan (Egypt)

=== Third place match ===
12 December 1996

Morocco	2–0	Nigeria
Bassir 49'; Jrindou 90'	Report

Stade Mohamed V, Casablanca
Attendance: 75,000
Referee: Falla Ndoye (Senegal)

=== Final ===
12 December 1996

Croatia	1 – 1	Czech Republic
Pralija 29'	Report	Drulák 4'
Penalties
Prosinečki (penalty scored); Asanović (penalty scored); Jarni (penalty scored); Vlaović (penalty scored)	4–1	(penalty scored) Drulák; (penalty missed) Čížek; (penalty missed) Bejbl

Stade Mohamed V, Casablanca
Attendance: 20,000
Referee: Said Belqola (Morocco)

1996 King Hassan II Tournament

Croatia
First title

== Statistics ==
=== Goalscorers ===
There were 11 goals scored in 4 matches, for an average of 2.75 goals per match.

2 goals

- (Morocco) Salaheddine Bassir
- (Czech Republic) Radek Drulák
- (Croatia) Goran Vlaović

1 goal

- (Croatia) Nenad Pralija
- (Czech Republic) Martin Hašek
- (Morocco) Abdellatif Jrindou
- (Morocco) Ahmed Bahja
- (Nigeria) Mobi Oparaku

Preceded by –	Hassan II Trophy; 1996	Succeeded by 1998
