= Salaheddine Bassir =

Moroccan footballer (born 1972)

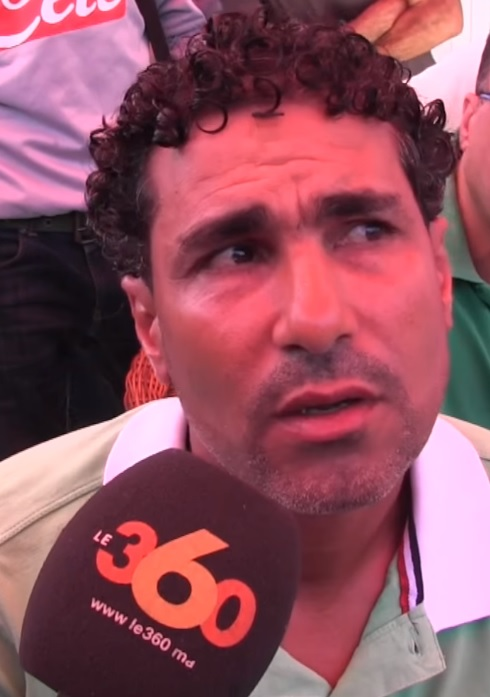

Personal information
- Date of birth: 5 September 1972 (age 54)
- Place of birth: Casablanca, Morocco
- Height: 1.72 m (5 ft 8 in)
- Position: Striker

Youth career
- Raja CA

Senior career*
Years	Team	Apps	(Gls)
1990–1996	Raja CA	160	(47)
1996–1997	Al-Hilal	24	(12)
1997–2001	Deportivo La Coruña	37	(12)
2001–2002	Lille	33	(3)
2002–2003	Aris Thessaloniki	12	(1)
Total		266	(73)

International career
1994–2002	Morocco	59	(27)
- * Club domestic league appearances and goals

Salaheddine Bassir (Arabic: صلاح الدين بصير; born 5 September 1972) is a Moroccan former professional footballer who played as a striker.

He played for a few clubs, including Raja Club Athletic, Al-Hilal (Saudi Arabia) and Deportivo La Coruña in Spain with whom he won la liga and copa del rey. He then played for OSC Lille (France) and Aris Thessaloniki (Greece). He retired at the end of 2005 season.

Whilst at Lille Bassir scored a goal against Olympiacos in the UEFA Champions League and once against Borussia Dortmund in the UEFA Europa League.

He played for the Morocco national team and was a participant at the 1998 FIFA World Cup, where he scored two goals in the 3–0 win against Scotland. He also scored a brace against France during the Hassan II Trophy final.

During the 2026 FIFA World Cup, Bassir reflected on his 1998 World Cup experience, stating that the current generation of Moroccan players possessed superior squad depth and maturity, while setting a quarter-final appearance as the minimum objective for the national team.

== Club career ==
In 1991, he joined the first team under the management of Fernando Cabrita. He quickly established himself and formed a formidable attacking line with Mustapha Moustawdae and Mustapha Khalif.

In his first season, Raja finished as runners-up behind Kawkab Marrakech and reached the final of the Throne Cup, where they faced CO Casablanca. The match took place on 11 January 1993 at Stade El Harti, with the Olympiques winning 1–0.

Raja again finished second in the 1992–1993 season, behind Wydad. In the Coupe, Raja took revenge against Olympique de Casablanca in the quarter-finals before being eliminated by Kawkab de Marrakech.

Raja finished the 1993–1994 Botola in 4th place and exited the Throne Cup in the round of 32 against Maghreb Fez. The following season, the team finished 8th in the league and suffered the biggest defeat in its history in the Coupe, losing 5–1 to Fath US in the round of 16. In this competition, Bassir had scored a hat-trick against Nasma Casablanca in the round of 16.

On 18 February 1996, in the quarter-finals of the Throne Cup, Raja recorded the biggest victory in the history of the Derby, sweeping aside their rivals by a score of 5–1. Bassir won a penalty and provided two assists. After defeating Rachad Bernoussi in the semi-finals (3–0), Raja defeated AS FAR in the final thanks to a goal by Abdellatif Jrindou in the 119 minute.

On 2 June, the team won the championship with three rounds remaining by defeating the IR Tangier, completing the first domestic double in the club's history. After scoring four goals in the semi-finals of the Arab Club Champions Cup, Raja lost the final on 16 September 1996 to Al Ahly SC in Egypt. Bassir was named the tournament's best player with nine goals.

On 28 September, he played his final match for the club against Difaâ El Jadida and scored the winning goal in a 1–0 victory.

In October 1996, he moved to Saudi Arabia to join Al-Hilal. With the club, he won the 1996–97 Asian Cup Winners' Cup, scoring a goal in the final, as well as the 1997 Asian Super Cup.

In July 1997, he signed a four-year contract with Deportivo de A Coruña for a transfer fee of €1.8 million. There, he joined his Moroccan national team teammates Noureddine Naybet and Mustapha Hadji. During the 1999–2000 season, the club won the Spanish league title for the first time in its history, finishing five points ahead of FC Barcelona. The following season, Deportivo finished as runners-up in Spain and were considered one of the major favorites in the UEFA Champions League, but they were eliminated in the quarter-finals by English side Leeds United.

In 1999, he suffered a severe allergic reaction that kept him away from the pitch for nearly a year. By the time he returned, he had already lost his place in the team to players such as Roy Makaay and Turu Flores.

After his contract ended in 2001, Bassir signed a one-season contract with Lille, where his former Raja teammate Abdelilah Fahmi was also playing. Maroc Hebdo reported that Vahid Halilhodžić had made his transfer a personal matter. On July 28, 2001, at the Parc des Princes, he made his debut by starting against Paris Saint-Germain in Ligue 1.

Having finished third the previous season, Lille qualified for the third qualifying round of the 2001–02 UEFA Champions League, marking their first appearance in the competition in fifty years. The club therefore faced Parma for a place in the group stage. Lille achieved one of the greatest upsets in its history by defeating Parma at the Stadio Ennio Tardini, with Bassir scoring one of the goals in a 2–0 victory. The return leg ended in a 0–1 defeat, but Lille nevertheless qualified.

In Group G, Lille finished third behind Deportivo La Coruña and Manchester United and ahead of Olympiacos, against whom Bassir scored. Dropped into the UEFA Cup, Lille eliminated Fiorentina before being knocked out by Borussia Dortmund, the eventual finalists, on the away-goals rule, despite an equalizing goal from Salaheddine Bassir in the 1–1 draw.

In the summer of 2002, he joined the Greek club Aris Thessaloniki. On May 17, 2003, he played in the 2003 Greek Cup final, which was lost to PAOK. Some time later, a serious knee injury and an unsuccessful operation forced him to end his career. He stated, "A footballer's career has a limited duration. Mine came to an end because of a recurring knee injury."

== International career ==
After playing for the Morocco U-20 national team and the Olympic team, he made his senior international debut on November 7, 1994, against Cameroon under the management of Abdellah Blinda. Following the arrival of Henri Michel in 1995, Bassir established himself as an undisputed starter. The chant "Bassir, Bassir, hou...hou..." became famous in Morocco as supporters repeatedly sang his name. He finished as the top scorer of the Hassan II Tournament on two occasions, in 1996, sharing the honor with Radek Drulák and Goran Vlaović, and in 1998, scoring two goals in each edition.

He is Morocco's top-scoring player in the qualifying rounds for the 1998 FIFA World Cup, with four goals. In the final tournament, after a 2–2 draw against Norway and a 0–3 defeat to Brazil, Morocco comfortably defeated Scotland thanks to a historic brace from Bassir, which remains etched in the memories of Moroccan fans. Believing that they had qualified, the Moroccans were overtaken in the standings by Norway, who controversially secured a 2–1 victory over Brazil in the final minutes, with Brazil already assured of finishing top of the group. Several observers, including Bassir, described the match as a conspiracy, with some even comparing it to the "match of shame" of 1982.

At the 1998 Africa Cup of Nations, after finishing first in their group, Morocco were eliminated in the quarter-finals by South Africa, losing 1–2. The Atlas Lions came within a few goals of qualifying for the 2002 FIFA World Cup, but Senegal ultimately secured qualification. Bassir participated in the 2000 and 2002 Africa Cup of Nations tournaments, scoring only one goal as Morocco were eliminated in the group stage on both occasions. He played his final international match against South Africa at the 2002 Africa Cup of Nations.

With 27 goals, behind Ahmed Faras, who scored 43, he is the second-highest scorer in the history of the Moroccan national team and is regarded as one of the greatest forwards in the history of the Atlas Lions.

== Career statistics ==
Scores and results list Morocco's goal tally first, score column indicates score after each Bassir goal.

List of international goals scored by Salaheddine Bassir
No.	Date	Venue	Opponent	Score	Result	Competition
1	3 January 1996	Stade Moulay Abdellah, Rabat, Morocco	Tunisia	2–0	3–1	Friendly
2	17 January 1996	Jules Ladoumègue Stadium, Vitrolles, France	Armenia	2–0	6-0	Friendly
3	6 October 1996	Cairo International Stadium, Cairo, Egypt	Egypt	1–0	1-1	1998 Africa Cup of Nations qualification
4	11 December 1996	Stade Mohamed V, Casablanca, Morocco	Croatia	1–2	2-2	Hassan II Trophy
5	12 December 1996	Stade Mohamed V, Casablanca, Morocco	Nigeria	1–0	2-0	Hassan II Trophy
6	12 January 1997	Baba Yara Stadium, Kumasi, Ghana	Ghana	1–0	2-2	1998 World Cup Qualification
7	6 April 1997	Stade Omar Bongo, Libreville, Gabon	Gabon	1–0	4–0	1998 World Cup Qualification
8	6 April 1997	Stade Omar Bongo, Libreville, Gabon	Gabon	2–0	4–0	1998 World Cup Qualification
9	26 April 1997	National Stadium, Freetown, Sierra Leone	Sierra Leone	1–0	1-0	1998 World Cup Qualification
10	21 June 1997	Stade Moulay Abdellah, Rabat, Morocco	Egypt	1–0	1-0	1998 Africa Cup of Nations qualification
11	13 July 1997	Addis Ababa Stadium, Addis Ababa, Ethiopia	Ethiopia	1–0	1-0	1998 Africa Cup of Nations qualification
12	27 July 1997	Stade Moulay Abdellah, Rabat, Morocco	Senegal	1–0	3–0	1998 World Cup Qualification
13	27 July 1997	Stade Moulay Abdellah, Rabat, Morocco	Senegal	3–0	3–0	1998 World Cup Qualification
14	5 February 1998	Stade El Harti, Marrakesh, Morocco	Niger	1–0	3-0	Friendly
15	22 April 1998	Vasil Levski National Stadium, Sofia, Bulgaria	Bulgaria	1–2	1-2	Friendly
16	29 May 1998	Stade Mohamed V, Casablanca, Morocco	France	1–0	2–2	Hassan II Trophy
17	29 May 1998	Stade Mohamed V, Casablanca, Morocco	France	2–1	2–2	Hassan II Trophy
18	23 June 1998	Stade Geoffroy-Guichard, Saint-Étienne, France	Scotland	1–0	3–0	1998 FIFA World Cup
19	23 June 1998	Stade Geoffroy-Guichard, Saint-Étienne, France	Scotland	3–0	3–0	1998 FIFA World Cup
20	2 September 1998	Tanger, Morocco	Senegal	2–0	2-0	Friendly
21	3 October 1998	Stade Mohamed V, Casablanca, Morocco	Sierra Leone	2–0	3-0	2000 Africa Cup of Nations qualification
22	23 December 1998	Agadir, Morocco	Bulgaria	3–1	4-1	Friendly
23	28 April 1999	GelreDome, Arnhem, Netherlands	Netherlands	2–0	2-1	Friendly
24	25 January 2000	National Stadium, Lagos, Nigeria	Congo	1–0	1-0	2000 African Cup of Nations
25	11 February 2001	Dubai, United Arab Emirates	Denmark	1–0	4–2	Friendship Tournament (UAE)
26	11 February 2001	Dubai, United Arab Emirates	Denmark	3–1	4–2	Friendship Tournament (UAE)
27	2 June 2001	Moi International Sports Centre, Nairobi, Kenya	Kenya	1–1	1-1	2002 African Cup of Nations qualification

== Honours ==
Raja CA

- Botola:1996
- Moroccan Throne Cup: 1996

Al-Hilal

- Asian Super Cup: 1997
- Asian Cup Winners' Cup: 1997

Deportivo de La Coruña

- La Liga: 2000
- Supercopa de España: 2000

Morocco

- Hassan II Trophy 3rd place: 1996
- Hassan II Trophy runner-up: 2002

Individual

- Best Moroccan player: 1997
- 1996 King Hassan II Cup top scorer
