= Yugoslavia national football team results =

Yugoslavia national football team results may refer to:

- Yugoslavia national football team results (1920–41)
- Yugoslavia national football team results (1946–69)
- Yugoslavia national football team results (1970–92)

== See also ==
- Croatia national football team results
- Serbia national football team results
