= Croatia national football team results =

For lists of Croatia national football team results see:

- Croatia national football team results (1940–1991)
- Croatia national football team results (1992–1999)
- Croatia national football team results (2000–2009)
- Croatia national football team results (2010–2019)
- Croatia national football team results (2020–present)
