= Noureddine Naybet =

Moroccan footballer (born 1970)

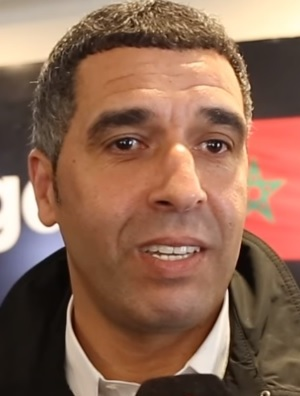
- Naybet in 2019

Personal information
- Date of birth: 10 February 1970 (age 56)
- Place of birth: Casablanca, Morocco
- Height: 1.86 m (6 ft 1 in)
- Position: Centre back

Senior career*
Years	Team	Apps	(Gls)
1989–1993	Wydad Casablanca	85	(4)
1993–1994	Nantes	34	(1)
1994–1996	Sporting CP	64	(5)
1996–2004	Deportivo La Coruña	211	(11)
2004–2006	Tottenham Hotspur	30	(1)
Total		424	(22)

International career
1992	Morocco U23	3	(1)
1990–2006	Morocco	115	(4)
Medal record
Representing Morocco
Africa Cup of Nations
Runner-up	2004 Tunisia
- * Club domestic league appearances and goals

Noureddine Naybet (Berber languages: ⵏⵓⵔⴷⴷⵉⵏ ⵏⴰⵢⴱⴻⵜ, Arabic: نور الدين نيبت; born 10 February 1970) is a Moroccan former professional footballer who played as a central defender. He played in Spain for Deportivo de La Coruña and in Portugal for Sporting CP, as well as in France for FC Nantes and in England for Tottenham Hotspur. He is considered one of the best defenders in La Liga of his generation. Naybet spent the longest and most successful period of his career with Deportivo La Coruña in Spain's La Liga, from 1996 to 2004. He was named the 44th greatest African player of all time by the African football expert Ed Dove.

Naybet played a record 115 matches for the Morocco national team scoring four goals, representing the country in two World Cups and six Africa Cup of Nations tournaments.

== Early life ==
Born in Casablanca on 10 February 1970, the young toddler, addicted to football, spent much of his time teasing the ball, in the streets of Derb Chorfa. Already talented and hardworking, he was quickly spotted by the Étoile de Casablanca, where he only stayed a week before joining Wydad Casablanca.

== Club career ==
=== Wydad ===
Naybet began his professional career playing for Wydad, being part of the squads that won three Botola championships as well as the 1992 edition of the CAF Champions League.

=== Nantes and Sporting ===
From 1993 to 1996 he represented FC Nantes (France) and Sporting CP (Portugal), being always an important first-team member and winning one domestic cup in each country. He played the 1995 Supertaça Cândido de Oliveira in 2 legged match against Porto, the first match ended in a 0–0 tie, as-well the second match ended in a 2–2 tie. Naybet found the net in the 42nd minute. Sporting won the replay match in a 3–0 victory.

=== Deportivo de La Coruña ===
In the 1996 summer Naybet signed a four-year deal with Spain's Deportivo de La Coruña, for roughly €1.6 million. He made his La Liga debut on 31 August 1996, playing the full 90 minutes in a 1–1 home draw against Real Madrid.

Naybet scored a career best four goals in the 1997–98 season, but the Galicians could only finish in 12th position. He was still an undisputed starter in 1999–2000 – often partnering Argentine Gabriel Schürrer – as the club conquered the first league in its history.

He won one La Liga league title in 1999–2000 La Liga, one Copa del Rey and two Spanish Super Cup.

In the 2000–01 UEFA Champions League, Deportivo passed the first round qualification with ease, In the second round they were placed with Galatasaray, AC Milan, and PSG. In his first qualification match Deportivo managed to defeat PSG 3–1 with Naybet scoring the equaliser after going 1-0 down. They advanced to the knockout stages and reached the quarter-finals of the Champions League, being knocked out by Leeds United.

In the 2001–02 UEFA Champions League, Naybet played a major role in the group stages playing in Deportivo's first match against Olympiacos which ended in a tie. They defeated Manchester United in their second match, 2–1, with Naybet scoring the winning goal in the last minute. They qualified top of their group and to the knockout stages, defeating Arsenal 2–0 in the round of 16. They were defeated by Manchester United in the quarter-final on a 5–2 aggregate.

Naybet started in all his 13 UEFA Champions League appearances in the 2003–04 campaign, helping Dépor to the semi-finals of the competition. In the last-four's second leg, at home against FC Porto, he was sent off by Pierluigi Collina after two bookable offenses, and the tie ended 1–0 in favour of the Portuguese team, who later went on to win the competition.

=== Tottenham Hotspur ===
On 12 August 2004, aged 34, Naybet joined Tottenham Hotspur for a reported fee of £700,000. He netted his first and only goal for Spurs on 13 November, in a 5–4 North London derby loss to Arsenal at White Hart Lane.

After only three games in 2005–06, under new manager Martin Jol, Naybet was released and retired from football. In June 2005, however, he had renewed his contract for a further season.

He spent most of his 17-year professional career with Deportivo La Coruña, appearing in 284 competitive games and winning four major titles, including the 2000 national championship. He also competed in France, Portugal and England.

== International career ==
Naybet was a Moroccan international for 16 years, gaining his first cap on 9 August 1990 in a 0–0 friendly draw in Tunisia.

He competed in the 1992 Summer Olympics.

He proceeded to appear for his country in two FIFA World Cups, playing two games in 1994 and three in 1998 as both editions ended in group stage elimination.

Naybet played all six contests in the 2004 African Cup of Nations, helping the Atlas Lions finish second in Tunisia. In early January 2006, five months after announcing his international retirement after falling out of favour with coach Ezzaki Badou, he returned to the national team just ahead of the 2006 Africa Cup of Nations.

In August 2007, Naybet was named assistant manager under Henri Michel.

== Style of play ==
"When I was in Deportivo La Coruna, I played with 3 Moroccan players.” He added, "I played with Naybet, who for me is among the top 5 defenders I've seen in my life. He's an amazing player. I also know Salaheddine Bassir and Mustapha Hadji.

— Lionel Scaloni

Ed Dove called Naybet "a well-rounded [centre-back] who boasted all of the physical attributes as well as the mental qualities to excel in the heart of the defence for major European sides."

== Personal life ==
A Muslim, Naybet observed fasting during the month of Ramadan, even when it coincided with the football season.

== Career statistics ==
=== International ===
Appearances and goals by national team and year
National team	Year	Apps	Goals
Morocco	1990	4	0
Morocco	1991	4	0
Morocco	1992	7	0
Morocco	1993	8	0
Morocco	1994	7	0
Morocco	1995	3	0
Morocco	1996	6	0
Morocco	1997	7	2
Morocco	1998	12	1
Morocco	1999	7	0
Morocco	2000	9	1
Morocco	2001	9	0
Morocco	2002	8	0
Morocco	2003	6	0
Morocco	2004	9	0
Morocco	2005	3	0
Morocco	2006	16	0
Total		115	4

Scores and results list Morocco's goal tally first, score column indicates score after each Naybet goal.

List of international goals scored by Noureddine Naybet
No.	Date	Venue	Opponent	Score	Result	Competition
1	31 May 1997	Stade Moulay Abdellah, Rabat, Morocco	Ethiopia	3–0	4–0	1998 African Cup of Nations qualification
2	16 August 1997	Stade Mohamed V, Casablanca, Morocco	Gabon	1–0	2–0	1998 FIFA World Cup qualification
3	23 December 1998	Agadir, Morocco	Bulgaria	1–0	4–1	Friendly
4	6 June 2000	Stade Mohamed V, Casablanca, Morocco	France	1–2	1–5	Hassan II Trophy

== Honours ==
Wydad Casablanca

- Botola: 1989–90, 1990–91, 1992–93
- Moroccan Throne Cup: 1989
- CAF Champions League: 1992
- Afro-Asian Cup: 1993
- Arab Club Champions Cup: 1989
- Arab Elite Cup: 1992

Sporting CP

- Taça de Portugal: 1995
- Supertaça Cândido de Oliveira: 1995

Deportivo La Coruña

- La Liga: 1999–2000; runner-up 2000–01, 2001–02
- Copa del Rey: 2001–02
- Supercopa de España: 2000, 2002

Morocco

- Africa Cup of Nations runner-up: 2004
- Hassan II Trophy runner-up: 2000
- Hassan II Trophy 3rd place: 1996

Individual

- Africa Cup of Nations Team of the Tournament: 1998
- IFFHS All-time Africa Men's Dream Team
- IFFHS All-time Morocco Men's Dream Team
- IFFHS CAF Men Team of the Century

== See also ==
- List of men's footballers with 100 or more international caps
