= Robert Špehar =

Croatian footballer (born 1970)

Personal information
- Date of birth: 13 May 1970 (age 56)
- Place of birth: Osijek, SR Croatia, SFR Yugoslavia
- Height: 1.85 m (6 ft 1 in)
- Position: Forward

Youth career
- 1981–1983: Osijek
- 1983–1985: Olimpija Osijek
- 1985–1988: Osijek

Senior career*
Years	Team	Apps	(Gls)
1988–1992	Osijek	54	(14)
1992–1994	NK Zagreb	46	(27)
1994–1995	Osijek	26	(23)
1995–1997	Club Brugge	50	(39)
1997–1999	AS Monaco	27	(6)
1999–2000	Verona	3	(0)
2000–2001	Sporting CP	11	(5)
2001–2002	Galatasaray	1	(0)
2002	Standard Liège	10	(3)
2002–2004	Osijek	39	(23)
2004–2005	Omonia	7	(3)
Total		274	(143)

International career
1992–1996	Croatia	8	(0)

Managerial career
- 2013–2014: NK Višnjevac
- 2017-2018: Marsonia
- 2022: Marsonia
Medal record
Representing Croatia
Hassan II Trophy
Winner	1996 King Hassan II International Cup Tournament	Team
- * Club domestic league appearances and goals

Robert Špehar (born 13 May 1970) is a Croatian football coach and a former international footballer who played as a striker. During his 18 years long senior career he played for Croatian Prva HNL teams NK Zagreb and NK Osijek in three occasions. In Belgium he played for Club Brugge with whom he won Belgian First Division and Belgian Cup. He also played for AS Monaco reaching the UEFA Champions League semi-finals, Verona, Sporting, Galatasaray, Standard Liège, before ending his career at Omonia with Cypriot Cup title. At international level he represented Croatia gaining eight caps over a five-year period, between 1992–1996 and was a member of their 1996 King Hassan II International Cup Tournament winning squad. He is the father of a footballer Dino Špehar who just like him started his professional career at NK Osijek, at the same time that Robert was in office as club's president. Robert's father and Dino's grandfather was a well-known football goalkeeper of NK Osijek in the 1960s. Most recently he coached Croatian lower-league side NK Višnjevac with whom he achieved promotion to Treća HNL division East.

== Club career ==
=== Monaco ===
Špehar was born in Osijek. He arrived in Principality of Monaco in summer 1997 with the status of Belgian First Division top scorer. The season before, 1996–97, he scored 26 goals playing for Club Brugge, a score that was outpaced by only three more players in next 20 seasons of league. The new season already started when he finally completed transfer move to AS Monaco and joined the company of a generation led by Fabien Barthez, Willy Sagnol, Ludovic Giuly, Victor Ikpeba, Thierry Henry, and David Trezeguet. After initial four games of the season, Monaco leadership and manager Jean Tigana estimated that the club will not be able to drag out complete season with two young strikers, Henry and Trezeguet, who were 19 years old and a few years older Victor Ikpeba, so they completed transfer of Belgian side Club Brugge top scorer Robert Špehar together with another striker from Division 1 club FC Nantes, Chadian Japhet N'Doram who came to Monaco as first division top scorer runner-up the season before. Špehar was very honored to be at the club, sharing a dressing room with such a class of teammates. A 1996–97 French Division 1 titleholder at the time, Monaco, went on with their successful spell and won the 1997 Trophée des Champions, played in the semi-finals of the 1997–98 UEFA Champions League with Špehar scoring a goal against Juventus, finishing third in 1997–98 Division 1 season qualifying so for 1998–99 UEFA Cup competition. Following the 1998–99 season, Špehar and Monaco achieved similar result in domestic league ending up in fourth place at the end qualifying again once more for an upcoming 1999–2000 UEFA Cup season.

The greatest moment in Špehar career happened in the semi-final second leg of the 1997–98 UEFA Champions League on 15 April 1998, a home match against Juventus. He scored by his own words, one of his favorite goals throughout entire career. A loft header over Juventus' goalkeeper Angelo Peruzzi brought a 3–2 win for Monaco. Unfortunately for Špehar and Monaco, they stayed short handed in the end, losing 6–4 on aggregate. Juventus advanced to the UEFA Champions League Final played in Amsterdam Arena, Amsterdam due to a 4–1 first leg advantage from Stadio delle Alpi, Turin, Italy.

== International career ==
Špehar made his debut for Croatia in a July 1992 friendly match away against Australia, coming on as a 78th-minute substitute for Goran Vučević, and earned a total of eight caps, scoring no goals. Most of them in friendlies. His final international was a December 1996 King Hassan II Tournament match against the Czech Republic.

== Managerial career ==
=== NK Osijek – presidency ===
==== Inauguration ====
On 25 August 2010 in football club Osijek after a meeting involving the key members of club management and most important sponsors of the club decision was made for a new president of Osijek to be Rober Špehar. One of the best goalscorers in the history of the club and a football legend who retired five years ago once again returned to Gradski vrt venue. This time as a president of Osijek football club. The club assemblies confirmed decision a few days later. With Špehar as president, club confirmed Gordan Matković, a former mayor of city of Osijek from HSP party as the new general director.

His last episode at club was successful as he was, for a second time, top goalscorer of Prva HNL, in 2003–04 season, six years ago. Since then, NK Osijek fell in financial and administrative problems followed by poor sports results in years to come. At the expense of his fearless will to help NK Osijek he left a comfortable life and a lucrative management job accepting the offered position of presidency from the club. From day one of his professional football career retirement, Špehar placed himself at the club's disposal and it was an opportunity given after five years of waiting. At first, his name was mentioned in the context of the sports director, but after the repeated refusal of presidency from local city businessmen and sponsors, this difficult assignment was eventually offered to Špehar. The job of sports director would be a natural follow-up for a successful former football player such as Špehar, but with no one willing to accept the presidency Špehar felt the obligation and duty to respond to appeal call from the club. As a politically neutral person with no ties to political parties, Špehar was seen as someone capable to attract new people, new ideas and new investments of those who have been avoiding the club so far.

His plan of presidency was focused on three main issues. First, the rise in home attendance, increasing the numbers of club supporters and spectators at home ground played matches. Second, achieve sports results needed for European competition qualification at the end of Prva HNL season. Third, to compete equally alongside Dinamo and Hajduk as a club of great tradition as NK Osijek deserves. First move Špehar made as a president of NK Osijek was a call addressed to all club legends and former football players including Davor Šuker, Nenad Bjelica and Marko Babić for a help in administering the club. He announced his office and club wide open to anybody of good will and love for the club, especially to current and former sports and working community of NK Osijek. He was determined to change the ingrained way of football club presidency in Croatia with an every day active role in the club throughout daily conversation with both football players and football coaches while taking care of sports management section as well. Špehar was endured by promise from both city of Osijek and club sponsors in desire to carry on with support towards the Osijek football club.

The official handover ceremony of presidential office to Robert Špehar took place on 29 August 2010. With Robert Špehar as president and Gordan Matković as general director, for a position of sport director Goran Popović was named, another NK Osijek football legend with more than a 400 overall appearances for the club, but his placement at the function of sport director was one of a formal act only because Špehar's condition to take over the club was to define the scope of his work together within the job done by the sport director with contract endorsement. NK Osijek board accepted the agreement and authorized legal approval for Špehar who was finally set and ready for his role as the president of his beloved Osijek. He did not hesitate too much to accept the diligent task as three generations of Špehar family have already been included in NK Osijek for more than fifty years without interruption at the time being. That is way Špehar took it very personally and emotionally, considering Osijek not just as a simple club but as his way of life. For those reasons, unlike his predecessors, he took even more obligations in his will to demonstrate a new type of presidency being at club's disposal 24 hours a day. Announcing many changes, Špehar's goal was to return fans to the stands and club legends to Gradski vrt publicly pointing out that there is no place for politics in the club, stating his role to be only as one of a sportsman and athlete with no interest of politics.

Gathering money funds for the club proper functioning was not a simple assignment, but Špehar did not allow himself to be discouraged by knocking on every door in the city asking for help from anyone who likes Osijek. The club financial situation at the moment of takeover was briefly consolidated due to previous Domagoj Vida transfer to Bayer Leverkusen worth HRK17,000,000. All annual active debts to players, coaches, working community and suppliers were settled with some money left for basic club maintenance. However, like his predecessors, Špehar inherited a formidable burden, a debt of as much as HRK97,000,000 that has been dragging since club bank account blockade in 1996.

==== Dino Špehar case ====
As a president, in October 2010 Špehar signed a professional contract with his son, a 16.5-year-old Dino Špehar, a captain of the Croatia U17 football team who in a short while scored three out of four team goals in three matches played in qualifying tournament which took place in Croatia from 27 September till 2 October 2010 thus helping Croatia U17 football team to qualify to the next round, so called Elite Round of 2011 UEFA European Under-17 Championship. Due to over repeated persisting of NK Osijek football academy director Miroslav Žitnjak for a quiet some time and a first team coach Branko Karačić demanded for such a player to be alongside first team football players, it was an act of proper time decision to offer his son, Dino, a professional contract. Meanwhile, club academy board decided to transfer young Špehar from cadet age to junior age team. After chief of staff in Gradski vrt, manager Karačić last request form in October, Špehar finally signed a contract continuing so the legacy of Špehar's family tradition and loyalty towards NK Osijek. With a signed professional contract, after more than six years of playing for the various younger categories of NK Osijek and scoring more than 300 goals even though Dino was not a striker, he was soon transferred to NK Osijek first team.

Špehar smoothly turned down the official Bayern bid of €300,000 in late summer 2010 for one of the best young Croatian football players, a product of NK Osijek youth academy, Dino Špehar, stating Dino has to prove himself first at the club and in Prva HNL before moving on board. Špehar was confident in his bid refusal due to large number of scouts that were already scouting young Špehar and replied to Bayern that they should add another zero to the bid. Dino was already well underlined in notebooks of Ajax, Manchester United and Tottenham scouting service who followed him closely in ongoing season. In January 2011 Špehar refused yet another transfer bid for Dino Špehar, this time it was Dinamo's Zdravko Mamić offer worth €900,000. Špehar saw in Dino a key player with whom he would build the future of NK Osijek for a period of next two to three years and was not ready to accept his departure from Gradski vrt stadium. However, Špehar did allowed package transfer deal of two brothers, 17-year-old Hrvoje and 19-year-old Ivan Plum worth €230,000. Dinamo's Zdravko Mamić offer for Plum brothers was considered more than correct as younger Plum was running out of contract in the summer 2011. It was a sign of a good gesture for future good relations between the two clubs, especially with a financial problems NK Osijek was struggling, were every income was a crucial one.

==== Late CFF candidacy ====
In February 2011 after the tangle and mess up with Croatian Football Federation presidential election 41-year-old Špehar proclaimed his will in new elections partaking as potential new candidate for an office of CFF president. Špehar placed his candidacy assuming that presidential elections are resumed and that unverified elected president Vlatko Marković is no longer a candidate. It was no secret that Špehar initially gave his vote to Vlatko Marković at the elections as someone who was already managing CFF well. At that point Marković by Špehar own opinion was a legally elected president of CFF. At first, Špehar was not pleased with his candidacy openly reaching public as it was spoken in private company of his friends. However, Špehar felt comfortable enough to lead CFF due to his achievements and lifetime spent in football which enriched his football knowledge. One of requirements for becoming a candidate was to be submitted by just one (out of 21) football county committees, thus showing support from all its corresponding football clubs and its working community. Špehar was counting on support from its local, Osijek-Baranja county and city of Osijek football community submitting vote. Unfortunately for Špehar, another well-known and already pre-arranged candidate for CFF presidential office, Davor Šuker, who was backed up by Croatian most powerful element in football, Dinamo's Zdravko Mamić and by 75-year-old Vlatko Marković own made promise of promotion by the end of year given to Šuker who was also Osijek born footballer and NK Osijek football legend Špehar was from the beginning in a difficult situation.

=== Coaching beginnings ===
After football career and the presidency of NK Osijek, Špehar saw his future on the bench as a football coach. With a successful accomplishment of his coaching school he decided to accept the bench of local low-league club NK Višnjevac for his first job as football coach. In his first season he managed not only to save the club from further relegation, he was able to secure a promotion to Treća HNL division East. He decided to leave the club after the first half of second season due to greater desire for coaching better-organized clubs with ambitions to play in more competitive league than the third league. Špehar feeling good on the field, on the bench, in training practice and during the match decided to patiently wait for that kind of opportunity, from Prva HNL clubs.

Špehar was dismissed by Marsonia in September 2022 after being appointed in January that year. He had left Marsonia in September 2018 for the first time after taking the helm in October 2017.

== Career statistics ==
Appearances and goals by club, season and competition
Club	Season	League		
Club	Season	Division	Apps	Goals
Osijek	1988–89	Yugoslav First League	2	0
Osijek	1989–90	Yugoslav First League	8	0
Osijek	1990–91	Yugoslav First League	14	1
Osijek	1992	Prva HNL	19	9
Osijek	1992–93	Prva HNL	11	4
Osijek	Total		54	14
NK Zagreb	1992–93	Prva HNL	14	9
NK Zagreb	1993–94	Prva HNL	32	18
NK Zagreb	Total		46	27
Osijek	1994–95	Prva HNL	26	23
Club Brugge	1995–96	Belgian First Division	22	12
Club Brugge	1996–97	Belgian First Division	27	26
Club Brugge	1997–98	Belgian First Division	1	3
Club Brugge	Total		50	39
Monaco	1997–98	Ligue 1	13	3
Monaco	1998–99	Ligue 1	14	3
Monaco	Total		27	6
Verona	1999–2000	Serie A	3	0
Sporting CP	2000–01	Primeira Liga	9	5
Sporting CP	2001–02	Primeira Liga	2	0
Sporting CP	Total		11	5
Galatasaray	2001–02	Süper Lig	1	0
Standard Liège	2001–02	Belgian First Division	10	3
Osijek	2002–03	Prva HNL	12	5
Osijek	2003–04	Prva HNL	27	18
Osijek	Total		39	23
Omonia Nicosia	2004–05	Cypriot First Division	7	3
Career total			274	143

== Honours ==
- Belgian First Division: 1

1995–96

- Belgian Cup: 1

1996

- Cypriot Cup: 1

2005

Individual

- Prva HNL top scorer: 2

1994–95, 2003–04

- Belgian First Division top scorer: 1

1996–97

- SN Yellow Shirt Award: 1

1995
