= 1998 King Hassan II International Cup Tournament =

Tournament details
- Host country: Morocco
- Dates: 27 – 29 May
- Teams: 4
- Venue: 1 (in 1 host city)

Final positions
- Champions: France (1st title)

Tournament statistics
- Matches played: 4
- Goals scored: 6 (1.5 per match)
- Attendance: 250,000 (62,500 per match)
- Top scorer: (Morocco) Salaheddine Bassir (2 goals)

The King Hassan II International Cup Tournament was an international football competition, which took place in the spring of 1998 in Morocco.

Host nation Morocco, France, England and Belgium participated in the tournament, and matches took place at the Stade Mohamed V, home of Moroccan clubs Raja Casablanca and Wydad Casablanca.

This mini-tournament was arranged as a preparatory exercise for the participating teams of the 1998 FIFA World Cup, taking place two weeks before the tournament, and it was won by France on the basis of having scored more goals. France went on to win the World Cup a few weeks later.

== Results ==
27 May 1998
17:30 UTC+1

Morocco	0 – 1	England
	Report	Owen 59'

Stade Mohamed V, Casablanca
Attendance: 80,000
Referee: Mourad Daami (Tunisia)

27 May 1998

France	1 – 0	Belgium
Zidane 64'	Report

Stade Mohamed V, Casablanca
Attendance: 80,000
Referee: Mohamed Guezzaz (Morocco)

29 May 1998
18:30 UTC+1

Belgium	0 – 0	England
	Report
Penalties
Van Meir (penalty scored); Borkelmans (penalty scored); Mpenza (penalty scored); Scifo (penalty missed); Vande Walle (penalty scored)	4 – 3	(penalty missed) Lee; (penalty scored) Owen; (penalty scored) Beckham; (penalty scored) Merson; (penalty missed) Ferdinand

Stade Mohamed V, Casablanca
Attendance: 25,000
Referee: Abderrahim El Arjoun (Morocco)

29 May 1998

Morocco	2 – 2	France
Bassir 9', 64'	Report	Blanc 24'; Djorkaeff 74'
Penalties
Ouakili (penalty scored); Triki (penalty scored); Saber (penalty scored); Abrami (penalty missed); Hadda (penalty scored); Amzine (penalty scored); Rossi (penalty scored)	6 – 5	(penalty scored) Blanc; (penalty missed) Djorkaeff; (penalty scored) Leboeuf; (penalty scored) Trezeguet; (penalty scored) Pires; (penalty scored) Vieira; (penalty missed) Candela

Stade Mohamed V, Casablanca
Attendance: 65,000
Referee: Idrissa Seck (Senegal)

== Table ==
Pos	Team	Pld	W	D2	D	L	GF	GA	GD	Pts (Note: Drawn games were followed by a penalty shootout: the winner received 1 bonus point (a bonus-point draw is marked "D2").)
1	France	2	1	0	1	0	3	2	+1	4
2	England	2	1	0	1	0	1	0	+1	4
3	Morocco	2	0	1	0	1	2	3	–1	2
4	Belgium	2	0	1	0	1	0	1	–1	2

1998 King Hassan II Tournament

France
First title

== Statistics ==
=== Goalscorers ===
There were 6 goals scored in 4 matches, for an average of 1.5 goals per match.

2 goals

- (Morocco) Salaheddine Bassir

1 goal

- (England) Michael Owen
- (France) Zinedine Zidane
- (France) Laurent Blanc
- (France) Youri Djorkaeff

== See also ==
1998 FIFA World Cup

Preceded by 1996	Hassan II Trophy; 1998	Succeeded by 2000
