= 2000 King Hassan II International Cup Tournament =

Tournament details
- Host country: Morocco
- Dates: 4 – 6 June
- Teams: 4
- Venue: 1 (in 1 host city)

Final positions
- Champions: France (2nd title)

Tournament statistics
- Matches played: 4
- Goals scored: 15 (3.75 per match)
- Attendance: 250,000 (62,500 per match)
- Top scorer(s): (France) Youri Djorkaeff (Japan) Shoji Jo (2 goals)

The 2000 King Hassan II International Cup Tournament was the third edition of this international football competition. It took place in the summer of 2000, less than a week before the Euro 2000. Matches were held on 4 and 6 June 2000 in Morocco. Host nation Morocco, France (who went on to win the Euro the following month), Japan and Jamaica participated in the tournament, and all matches took place at the Stade Mohamed V, home of Moroccan clubs Raja Casablanca and Wydad Casablanca. The tournament was played in a cup format, with only four games played (two semi-finals, a final and a third-place match).

The last edition of the Hassan II Trophy tournament was won by France after beating Morocco in the final 5-1.

== Participating teams ==
- Morocco (host)
- France
- Japan
- Jamaica

== Results ==
Semi-finals
4 June
Japan	2 (2)
France (pen)	2 (4)
4 June
Morocco	1
Jamaica	0

Final
6 June
France	5
Morocco	1
Third place
6 June
Japan	4
Jamaica	0

=== Semifinals ===
4 June 2000

Japan	2-2	France
Morishima 34'; Nishizawa 70'	Report	Zidane 61'; Djorkaeff 75'
Penalties
Nakata (penalty scored); Miura (penalty scored); Inamoto (penalty missed); Nanami (penalty missed)	2-4	(penalty scored) Djorkaeff; (penalty scored) Anelka; (penalty scored) Henry; (penalty scored) Leboeuf

Stade Mohamed V, Casablanca
Attendance: 40,000
Referee: Abderrahim El Arjoun (Morocco)

4 June 2000

Morocco	1-0	Jamaica
Zerouali 61'	Report

Stade Mohamed V, Casablanca
Attendance: 40,000

=== Third place match ===
6 June 2000

Japan	4-0	Jamaica
Jo 47', 60'; A. Miura 66'; K. Miura 80'	Report

Stade Mohamed V, Casablanca
Attendance: 10,000
Referee: Sidi Bekaye (Mali)

=== Final ===
6 June 2000

Morocco	1-5	France
Naybet 65'	Report	Henry 27'; Djorkaeff 56'; Dugarry 79'; Anelka 83'; Wiltord 90+2'

Stade Mohamed V, Casablanca
Attendance: 57,000
Referee: Ali Bujsaim (United Arab Emirates)

== Awards ==
2000 King Hassan II Tournament

France
Second title

== Statistics ==
=== Goalscorers ===
There were 15 goals scored in 4 matches, for an average of 3.75 goals per match.

2 goals

- (France) Youri Djorkaeff
- (Japan) Shoji Jo

1 goal

- (France) Zinedine Zidane
- (France) Thierry Henry
- (France) Christophe Dugarry
- (France) Nicolas Anelka
- (France) Sylvain Wiltord
- (Japan) Akinori Nishizawa
- (Japan) Atsuhiro Miura
- (Japan) Kazuyoshi Miura
- (Japan) Hiroaki Morishima
- (Morocco) Hicham Zerouali
- (Morocco) Noureddine Naybet

Preceded by 1998	Hassan II Trophy; 2000	Succeeded by –
