= Croatia national football team results (2020–present) =

This is a list of the Croatia national football team results from 2020 to present.

== Key ==
Win
Draw
Loss

As per statistical convention in football, matches decided in extra time are counted as wins and losses, while matches decided by penalty shoot-outs are counted as draws.

== Results ==
=== 2020 ===
26 March 2020 Friendly	Croatia	Cancelled	Switzerland	Al Rayyan, Qatar

30 March 2020 Friendly	Portugal	Cancelled	Croatia	Al Rayyan, Qatar

5 September 2020 2020–21 Nations League	Portugal	4–1	Croatia	Porto, Portugal
19:45	Cancelo 41'; Jota 58'; Félix 70'; A. Silva 90+4'	Report	Jedvaj (yellow card) 60'; Barišić (yellow card) 71'; Petković 90+1'	Stadium: Estádio do Dragão; Attendance: 0 (Note: Due to the COVID-19 pandemic in Europe, all matches scheduled for September 2020 were played behind closed doors.); Referee: Davide Massa (Italy); Assistant referees: Filippo Meli (Italy); Stefano Alassio (Italy); Fourth official: Paolo Valeri (Italy)

8 September 2020 2020–21 Nations League	France	4–2	Croatia	Saint-Denis, France
20:45	Lenglet (yellow card) 38'; Griezmann 43'; Livaković 45+1' (o.g.); Kanté (yellow card) 59'; Upamecano 65'; Nzonzi (yellow card) 68'; Giroud 77' (pen.)	Report	Lovren 17', (yellow card) 76'; Ćaleta-Car (yellow card) 34'; Brekalo 55'; Brozović (yellow card) 76'	Stadium: Stade de France; Attendance: 0 Referee: Ovidiu Haţegan (Romania); Assistant referees: Octavian Sovre (Romania); Sebastian Gheorghe (Romania); Fourth official: Sebastian Colțescu (Romania)

7 October 2020 Friendly	Switzerland	1–2	Croatia	St. Gallen, Switzerland
20:45	Gavranović 31'; Lotomba (yellow card) 39'	Report	Kovačić (yellow card) 18'; Brekalo 42'; Mari. Pašalić 67'; Jedvaj (yellow card) 90+1'	Stadium: Kybunpark; Attendance: 4,500; Referee: Tiago Martins (Portugal); Assistant referees: Luis Campos (Portugal); Pedro Almeida (Portugal); Fourth official: Urs Schnyder (Switzerland)

11 October 2020 2020–21 Nations League	Croatia	2–1	Sweden	Zagreb, Croatia
18:00	Kovačić (yellow card) 2'; Vlašić 32'; Brozović (yellow card) 45'; Kramarić 84'	Report	Berg 66'; Larsson (yellow card) 90+4'	Stadium: Stadion Maksimir; Attendance: 2,020; Referee: John Beaton (Scotland); Assistant referees: Dougie Potter (Scotland); Daniel McFarlane (Scotland); Fourth official: Steven McClean (Scotland)

14 October 2020 2020–21 Nations League	Croatia	1–2	France	Zagreb, Croatia
20:45	Vlašić (yellow card) 5', (goal) 65'; Uremović (yellow card) 57'; Lovren (yellow card) 90+2'	Report	Digne (yellow card) 4'; Griezmann 8'; Mbappé 79'; Pogba (yellow card) 90+1'	Stadium: Stadion Maksimir; Attendance: 6,266; Referee: Björn Kuipers (Netherlands); Assistant referees: Sander van Roekel (Netherlands); Erwin Zeinstra (Netherlands); Fourth official: Serdar Gözübüyük (Netherlands)

11 November 2020 Friendly	Turkey	3–3	Croatia	Istanbul, Turkey
21:45	Tosun 23' (pen.); Kabak (yellow card) 38'; Türüç 41'; Ünder 58'	Report	Budimir 32'; Mari. Pašalić 53'; Brekalo 56'; Perišić (yellow card) 85'	Stadium: Vodafone Park; Attendance: 0 Referee: Slavko Vinčić (Slovenia); Assistant referees: Grega Kordež (Slovenia); Andraž Kovačič (Slovenia); Fourth official: Matej Jug (Slovenia)

14 November 2020 2020–21 Nations League	Sweden	2–1	Croatia	Solna, Sweden
20:45	Kulusevski 36'; Danielson 45+2'; Ekdal (yellow card) 86'	Report	Ćaleta-Car (yellow card) 35'; Brekalo (yellow card) 68'; Danielson 82' (o.g.)	Stadium: Friends Arena; Attendance: 0 (Note: Due to the COVID-19 pandemic in Europe, the match was played behind closed doors.); Referee: Daniel Siebert (Germany); Assistant referees: Jan Seidel (Germany); Rafael Foltyn (Germany); Fourth official: Robert Schröder (Germany)

17 November 2020 2020–21 Nations League	Croatia	2–3	Portugal	Split, Croatia
20:45	Rog (yellow card) 22' (yellow-red card) 51'; Kovačić 29', 65'; Perišić (yellow card) 57'	Report	Dias 52', 90'; Ronaldo (yellow card) 54'; Félix 60'	Stadium: Stadion Poljud; Attendance: 0 Referee: Michael Oliver (England); Assistant referees: Stuart Burt (England); Simon Bennett (England); Fourth official: Paul Tierney (England)

=== 2021 ===
24 March 2021 2022 World Cup qualification	Slovenia	1–0	Croatia	Ljubljana, Slovenia
20:45	Lovrić 15'; Kurtić (yellow card) 61'; Mevlja (yellow card) 77'	Report (FIFA); Report (UEFA)	Barišić (yellow card) 24'; Brozović (yellow card) 35'; Vrsaljko (yellow card) 65'; Vida (yellow card) 67'; Budimir (yellow card) 76'	Stadium: Stadion Stožice; Attendance: 0 Referee: Antonio Mateu Lahoz (Spain)

27 March 2021 2022 World Cup qualification	Croatia	1–0	Cyprus	Rijeka, Croatia
18:00	Mari. Pašalić 40'; Ćaleta-Car (yellow card) 48'; Perišić (yellow card) 69'; Kovačić (yellow card) 90+3'	Report (FIFA); Report (UEFA)		Stadium: Stadion Rujevica; Attendance: 0 Referee: Kristo Tohver (Estonia)

30 March 2021 2022 World Cup qualification	Croatia	3–0	Malta	Rijeka, Croatia
20:45	Perišić 62'; Modrić 76' (pen.); Vida (yellow card) 81'; Brekalo 90'; Vlašić (yellow card) 90+2'	Report (FIFA); Report (UEFA)		Stadium: Stadion Rujevica; Attendance: 0 Referee: Lionel Tschudi (Switzerland)

1 June 2021 Friendly	Croatia	1–1	Armenia	Velika Gorica, Croatia
18:00	Perišić 24'; Rebić (yellow card) 52'	Report	Terteryan (yellow card) 38'; Wbeymar 72'	Stadium: Gradski stadion Velika Gorica; Attendance: 0 Referee: Luka Bilbija (Bosnia and Herzegovina)

6 June 2021 Friendly	Belgium	1–0	Croatia	Brussels, Belgium
20:45	R. Lukaku 38'	Report		Stadium: King Baudouin Stadium; Attendance: 50; Referee: Deniz Aytekin (Germany)

13 June 2021 Euro 2020 Group D	England	1–0	Croatia	London, England
14:00	Sterling 57'; Foden (yellow card) 64'	Report	Ćaleta-Car (yellow card) 42'; Kovačić (yellow card) 48'; Brozović (yellow card) 66'	Stadium: Wembley Stadium; Attendance: 18,497; Referee: Daniele Orsato (Italy)

18 June 2021 Euro 2020 Group D	Croatia	1–1	Czech Republic	Glasgow, Scotland
17:00	Lovren (yellow card) 35'; Perišić 47'	Report	Schick 37' (pen.); Masopust (yellow card) 50': Bořil (yellow card) 82'; Hložek (yellow card) 90+3'	Stadium: Hampden Park; Attendance: 5,607; Referee: Carlos del Cerro Grande (Spain)

22 June 2021 Euro 2020 Group D	Croatia	3–1	Scotland	Glasgow, Scotland
20:00	Vlašić 17'; Lovren (yellow card) 26'; Modrić 62'; Perišić 77'	Report	McKenna (yellow card) 34'; McGregor 42'	Stadium: Hampden Park; Attendance: 9,896; Referee: Fernando Rapallini (Argentina)

28 June 2021 Euro 2020 R16	Croatia	3–5 (a.e.t.)	Spain	Copenhagen, Denmark
18:00	Pedri 20' (o.g.); Brozović (yellow card) 73'; Ćaleta-Car (yellow card) 84'; Oršić 85'; Mari. Pašalić 90+2'	Report	Sarabia 38'; Azpilicueta 57'; F. Torres 77'; Morata 100'; Oyarzabal 103'	Stadium: Parken Stadium; Attendance: 22,771; Referee: Cüneyt Çakır (Turkey)

1 September 2021 2022 World Cup qualification	Russia	0–0	Croatia	Moscow, Russia
21:45 UTC+3	Barinov (yellow card) 35'; Cheryshev (yellow card) 90+4'	Report		Stadium: Luzhniki Stadium; Attendance: 18,708; Referee: Orel Grinfeld (Israel)

4 September 2021 2022 World Cup qualification	Slovakia	0–1	Croatia	Bratislava, Slovakia
20:45 UTC+2	Pekarík (yellow card) 38'; Boženík (yellow card) 90+3'	Report	Brozović 86'; Ivušić (yellow card) 90+3'	Stadium: Tehelné pole Attendance: 9,047; Referee: Bartosz Frankowski (Poland)

7 September 2021 2022 World Cup qualification	Croatia	3–0	Slovenia	Split, Croatia
20:45	Livaja 33'; Mari. Pašalić 66'; Vlašić 90+4'	Report	Bijol (yellow card) 90+1'	Stadium: Stadion Poljud; Attendance: 16,237; Referee: Clément Turpin (France)

8 October 2021 2022 World Cup qualification	Cyprus	0–3	Croatia	Larnaca, Cyprus
21:45	Artymatas (yellow card) 33'; Avraam (yellow card) 44'	Report	Kovačić (yellow card) 33'; Perišić 45+2'; Stanišić (yellow card) 61'; Gvardiol 80'; Livaja 90+2'	Stadium: AEK Arena – Georgios Karapatakis; Attendance: 2,333; Referee: Michael Oliver (England)

11 October 2021 2022 World Cup qualification	Croatia	2–2	Slovakia	Osijek, Croatia
20:45	Kramarić 25'; Modrić 71'; Barišić (yellow card) 90'	Report	Schranz 20', (yellow card) 80'; Haraslín 45+1'; Kucka (yellow card) 69'; Rodák (yellow card) 70'; Hancko (yellow card) 89'	Stadium: Gradski Vrt; Attendance: 9,926; Referee: Ovidiu Hațegan (Romania)

11 November 2021 2022 World Cup qualification	Malta	1–7	Croatia	Ta' Qali, Malta
20:45	Brozović 31' (o.g.); Pepe (yellow card) 79'	Report	Perišić 6'; Ćaleta-Car 22'; Mari. Pašalić 39'; Modrić 45+1'; Majer 47', 64'; Kramarić 53'	Stadium: National Stadium; Attendance: 4,581; Referee: Deniz Aytekin (Germany)

14 November 2021 2022 World Cup qualification	Croatia	1–0	Russia	Split, Croatia
15:00	Kudryashov 81' (o.g.); Livaja (yellow card) 90'; Grbić (yellow card) 90+3'	Report	Golovin (yellow card) 51'; Smolov (yellow card) 55'	Stadium: Stadion Poljud; Attendance: 30,257; Referee: Danny Makkelie (Netherlands)

=== 2022 ===
26 March 2022 Friendly	Croatia	1–1	Slovenia	Al Rayyan, Qatar
17:00 UTC+3	Kramarić 39'	Report	Bijol 90+1'	Stadium: Education City Stadium; Attendance: 3,000; Referee: Abdullah Jamali (Kuwait); Assistant referees: Sayedali Sayedali (Kuwait); Ahmad Abbas (Kuwait); Fourth official: Ammar Ashkanani (Kuwait)

29 March 2022 Friendly	Croatia	2–1	Bulgaria	Al Rayyan, Qatar
16:00	Modrić 76' (pen.); Kramarić 80'	Report	Despodov 69'	Stadium: Education City Stadium; Attendance: 1,000; Referee: Khamis Mohammed Al-Marri (Qatar); Assistant referees: Yousuf Aref Al-Shamari (Qatar); Zahy Snaid Alshammari (Qatar); Fourth official: Abdulhadi Alasmar Al-Ruaile (Qatar)

3 June 2022 2022–23 Nations League	Croatia	0–3	Austria	Osijek, Croatia
20:45		Report	Arnautović 41'; Gregoritsch 54'; Sabitzer 57'	Stadium: Gradski Vrt Stadium; Attendance: 13,994; Referee: Chris Kavanagh (England); Assistant referees: Daniel Cook (England); Neil Davies (England); Fourth official: Craig Pawson (England)

6 June 2022 2022–23 Nations League	Croatia	1–1	France	Split, Croatia
20:45	Kramarić 83' (pen.)	Report	Rabiot 52'	Stadium: Stadion Poljud; Attendance: 31,560; Referee: Marco Guida (Italy); Assistant referees: Ciro Carbone (Italy); Giorgio Peretti (Italy); Fourth official: Giovanni Ayroldi (Italy)

10 June 2022 2022–23 Nations League	Denmark	0–1	Croatia	Copenhagen, Denmark
20:45		Report	Mari. Pašalić 69'	Stadium: Parken Stadium; Attendance: 35,862; Referee: Bartosz Frankowski (Poland); Assistant referees: Marcin Boniek (Poland); Jakub Winkler (Poland); Fourth official: Krzysztof Jakubik (Poland)

13 June 2022 2022–23 Nations League	France	0–1	Croatia	Saint-Denis, France
20:45		Report	Modrić 5' (pen.)	Stadium: Stade de France; Attendance: 77,410; Referee: Orel Grinfeld (Israel); Assistant referees: Roy Hassan (Israel); Idan Yarkoni (Israel); Fourth official: Gal Leibovitz (Israel)

22 September 2022 2022–23 Nations League	Croatia	2–1	Denmark	Zagreb, Croatia
20:45	Sosa 49'; Majer 79'	Report	Eriksen 77'	Stadium: Stadion Maksimir; Attendance: 22,715; Referee: Davide Massa (Italy); Assistant referees: Filippo Meli (Italy); Stefano Alassio (Italy); Fourth official: Fabio Maresca (Italy)

25 September 2022 2022–23 Nations League	Austria	1–3	Croatia	Vienna, Austria
20:45	Baumgartner 9'	Report	Modrić 6'; Livaja 69'; Lovren 72'	Stadium: Ernst-Happel-Stadion; Attendance: 45,700; Referee: Artur Soares Dias (Portugal); Assistant referees: Rui Tavares (Portugal); Paulo Soares (Portugal); Fourth official: Gustavo Correia (Portugal)

16 November 2022 Friendly	Saudi Arabia	0–1	Croatia	Riyadh, Saudi Arabia
13:00 CET (15:00 AST)		Report	Kramarić 82'	Stadium: Prince Faisal bin Fahd Stadium; Attendance: 8,287; Referee: Adham Makhadmeh (Jordan); Assistant referees: Ahmad Alroalle (Jordan); Mohammad Alkalaf (Jordan); Fourth official: Khalid Alturais (Saudi Arabia)

23 November 2022 2022 World Cup Group F	Morocco	0–0	Croatia	Al Khor, Qatar
11:00 CET (13:00 AST)		Report		Stadium: Al Bayt Stadium; Attendance: 59,407; Referee: Fernando Andrés Rapallini (Argentina); Assistant referees: Juan Pablo Belatti (Argentina); Diego Yamil Bonfá (Argentina); Fourth official: Kevin Ortega (Peru); Man of the Match: Luka Modrić (Croatia)

27 November 2022 2022 World Cup Group F	Croatia	4–1	Canada	Al Rayyan, Qatar
17:00 CET (19:00 AST)	Kramarić 36', 70'; Livaja 44'; Majer 90+4'	Report	Davies 2'	Stadium: Khalifa International Stadium; Attendance: 44,374; Referee: Andrés Matonte (Uruguay); Assistant referees: Nicolás Taran (Uruguay); Martin Soppi (Uruguay); Fourth official: Kevin Ortega (Peru)

1 December 2022 2022 World Cup Group F	Croatia	0–0	Belgium	Al Rayyan, Qatar
16:00 CET (18:00 AST)		Report		Stadium: Ahmad bin Ali Stadium; Attendance: 43,984; Referee: Anthony Taylor (England); Assistant referees: Gary Beswick (England); Adam Nunn (England); Fourth official: István Kovács (Romania)

5 December 2022 2022 World Cup R16	Japan	1–1 (a.e.t.) (1–3 p)	Croatia	Al Wakrah, Qatar
18:00 UTC+3	Maeda 43'	Report	Perišić 55'	Stadium: Al Janoub Stadium; Attendance: 42,523; Referee: Ismail Elfath (United States); Assistant referees: Corey Parker (United States); Kyle Atkins (United States); Fourth official: Mustapha Ghorbal (Algeria)
	Penalties
	Minamino (penalty missed); Mitoma (penalty missed); Asano (penalty scored); Yoshida (penalty missed)		(penalty scored) Vlašić; (penalty scored) Brozović; (penalty missed) Livaja; (penalty scored) Mari. Pašalić

9 December 2022 2022 World Cup QF	Croatia	1–1 (a.e.t.) (4–2 p)	Brazil	Al Rayyan, Qatar
18:00 UTC+3	Petković 117'	Report	Neymar 105+1'	Stadium: Education City Stadium; Attendance: 43,893; Referee: Michael Oliver (England); Assistant referees: Stuart Burt (England); Gary Beswick (England); Fourth official: Mustapha Ghorbal (Algeria)
	Penalties
	Vlašić (penalty scored); Majer (penalty scored); Modrić (penalty scored); Oršić (penalty scored)		(penalty missed) Rodrygo; (penalty scored) Casemiro; (penalty scored) Pedro; (penalty missed) Marquinhos

13 December 2022 2022 World Cup SF	Argentina	3–0	Croatia	Lusail, Qatar
20:00 CET (22:00 AST)	Messi 34' (pen.); Álvarez 39', 69'	Report		Stadium: Lusail Iconic Stadium; Attendance: 88,966; Referee: Daniele Orsato (Italy); Assistant referees: Ciro Carbone (Italy); Alessandro Giallatini (Italy); Fourth official: Mohammed Abdulla Hassan Mohamed (United Arab Emirates); Man of the Match: Lionel Messi (Argentina)

17 December 2022 2022 World Cup 3rd	Croatia	2–1	Morocco	Al Rayyan, Qatar
16:00 CET (18:00 AST)	Gvardiol 7'; Oršić 42'	Report	Dari 9'	Stadium: Khalifa International Stadium; Attendance: 44,137; Referee: Abdulrahman Al-Jassim (Qatar); Assistant referees: Taleb Al-Marri (Qatar); Saud Al-Maqaleh (Qatar); Fourth official: Raphael Claus (Brazil); Man of the Match: Joško Gvardiol (Croatia)

=== 2023 ===
25 March 2023 Euro 2024 qualifying	Croatia	1–1	Wales	Split, Croatia
20:45	Kramarić 28'	Report	Broadhead 90+3'	Stadium: Stadion Poljud; Attendance: 33,474; Referee: João Pinheiro (Portugal); Assistant referees: Bruno Jesus (Portugal); Luciano Maia (Portugal); Fourth official: Vitor Ferreira (Portugal)

28 March 2023 Euro 2024 qualifying	Turkey	0–2	Croatia	Bursa, Turkey
20:45 CEST (21:45 TRT)		Report	Kovačić 20', 45+4'	Stadium: Bursa Metropolitan Stadium; Attendance: 37,750; Referee: Andreas Ekberg (Sweden); Assistant referees: Fredrik Klyver (Sweden); Niklas Nyberg (Sweden); Fourth official: Granit Maqedonci (Sweden)

14 June 2023 2022–23 Nations League SF	Netherlands	2–4 (a.e.t.)	Croatia	Rotterdam, Netherlands
20:45 CEST	Malen 34'; Lang 90+6'	Report	Kramarić 55' (pen.); Mari. Pašalić 72'; Petković 98'; Modrić 116' (pen.)	Stadium: De Kuip; Attendance: 39,359; Referee: István Kovács (Romania); Assistant referees: Vasile Florin Marinescu (Romania); Ovidiu Artene (Romania); Fourth official: Halil Umut Meler (Turkey)

18 June 2023 2022–23 Nations League F	Croatia	0–0 (a.e.t.) (4–5 p)	Spain	Rotterdam, Netherlands
20:45 CEST		Report		Stadium: De Kuip; Attendance: 41,110; Referee: Felix Zwayer (Germany); Assistant referees: Stefan Lupp (Germany); Marco Achmüller (Germany); Fourth official: Ivan Kružliak (Slovakia); Man of the Match: Marcelo Brozović (Croatia)
	Penalties
	Vlašić (penalty scored); Brozović (penalty scored); Modrić (penalty scored); Majer (penalty missed); Perišić (penalty scored); Petković (penalty missed)		(penalty scored) Joselu; (penalty scored) Rodri; (penalty scored) Merino; (penalty scored) Asensio; (penalty missed) Laporte; (penalty scored) Carvajal

8 September 2023 Euro 2024 qualifying	Croatia	5–0	Latvia	Rijeka, Croatia
20:45	Petković 3', 44'; Ivanušec 13'; Kramarić 68'; Mari. Pašalić 78'	Report		Stadium: Stadion Rujevica; Attendance: 8,152; Referee: Philip Farrugia (Malta)

11 September 2023 Euro 2024 qualifying	Armenia	0–1	Croatia	Yerevan, Armenia
18:00 (20:00 UTC+4)		Report	Kramarić 13'	Stadium: Vazgen Sargsyan Republican Stadium; Attendance: 14,233; Referee: Clément Turpin (France)

12 October 2023 Euro 2024 qualifying	Croatia	0–1	Turkey	Osijek, Croatia
20:45		Report	Yılmaz 30'	Stadium: Opus Arena; Attendance: 12,812; Referee: Anthony Taylor (England)

15 October 2023 Euro 2024 qualifying	Wales	2–1	Croatia	Cardiff, Wales
20:45 (19:45 UTC+1)	Wilson 47', 60'	Report	Mari. Pašalić 75'	Stadium: Cardiff City Stadium; Attendance: 31,240; Referee: Davide Massa (Italy)

18 November 2023 Euro 2024 qualifying	Latvia	0–2	Croatia	Riga, Latvia
18:00 CET (19:00 EET)		Report	Majer 7'; Kramarić 16'	Stadium: Skonto Stadium; Attendance: 6,747; Referee: Urs Schnyder (Switzerland)

21 November 2023 Euro 2024 qualifying	Croatia	1–0	Armenia	Zagreb, Croatia
20:45	Budimir 43'	Report		Stadium: Stadion Maksimir; Attendance: 20,398; Referee: Ivan Kružliak (Slovakia)

=== 2024 ===
23 March 2024 2024 FIFA Series	Tunisia	0–0 (4–5 p)	Croatia	Cairo, Egypt
21:00		Report		Stadium: Cairo International Stadium; Attendance: 4,300; Referee: Mohamed Maarouf (Egypt)
	Penalties
	Ben Romdhane (penalty scored); Laïdouni (penalty scored); Abdi (penalty scored); Jelassi (penalty missed); Ltaief (penalty scored); Jaziri (penalty missed); Haddadi (penalty missed)		(penalty missed) Vlašić; (penalty scored) Kramarić; (penalty scored) Petković; (penalty scored) Majer; (penalty scored) Mario Pašalić; (penalty missed) Juranović; (penalty scored) Marc. Pašalić

26 March 2024 2024 FIFA Series	Egypt	2–4	Croatia	New Administrative Capital, Egypt
22:00	Rabia 6'; Abdelmonem 90+4'	Report	Vlašić 21'; Petković 57'; Kramarić 77'; Majer 86'	Stadium: New Administrative Capital Stadium; Attendance: 85,350; Referee: Adalbert Diouf (Senegal)

3 June 2024 Friendly	Croatia	3–0	North Macedonia	Rijeka, Croatia
19:00	Majer 10', 45'; Marc. Pašalić 79'	Report		Stadium: Stadion Rujevica; Attendance: 8,030; Referee: Matej Jug (Slovenia); Assistant referees: Matej Žunič (Slovenia); Manuel Vidali (Slovenia); Fourth official: Antonio Melnjak (Croatia)

8 June 2024 Friendly	Portugal	1–2	Croatia	Oeiras, Portugal
18:45	Jota 48'	Report	Modrić 8' (pen.); Budimir 56'	Stadium: Estádio Nacional; Attendance: 37,800; Referee: Harm Osmers (Germany)

15 June 2024 Euro 2024 Group B	Spain	3–0	Croatia	Berlin, Germany
18:00 CEST	Morata 29'; Ruiz 32'; Carvajal 45+2'	Report	Petković (penalty missed) 80'	Stadium: Olympiastadion; Attendance: 68,844; Referee: Michael Oliver (England); Assistant referees: Stuart Burt (England); Daniel Cook (England); Fourth official: Anthony Taylor (England); Man of the Match: Fabián Ruiz

19 June 2024 Euro 2024 Group B	Croatia	2–2	Albania	Hamburg, Germany
15:00 CEST	Kramarić 74'; Gjasula 76' (o.g.)	Report	Laçi 11'; Gjasula 90+5'	Stadium: Volksparkstadion; Attendance: 46,784; Referee: François Letexier (France); Assistant referees: Cyril Mugnier (France); Mehdi Rahmouni (France); Fourth official: Sandro Schärer (Switzerland); Man of the Match: Andrej Kramarić

24 June 2024 Euro 2024 Group B	Croatia	1–1	Italy	Leipzig, Germany
21:00 CEST	Modrić (penalty missed) 54', 55'	Report	Zaccagni 90+8'	Stadium: Red Bull Arena; Attendance: 38,322; Referee: Danny Makkelie (Netherlands); Assistant referees: Hessel Steegstra (Netherlands); Jan de Vries (Netherlands); Fourth official: Serdar Gözübüyük (Netherlands); Man of the Match: Luka Modrić

5 September 2024 2024–25 Nations League	Portugal	2–1	Croatia	Lisbon, Portugal
20:45 CEST (19:45 WET)	Dalot 7'; Ronaldo 34'	Report	Dalot 41' (o.g.)	Stadium: Estádio da Luz; Attendance: 57,675; Referee: Halil Umut Meler (Turkey)

8 September 2024 2024–25 Nations League	Croatia	1–0	Poland	Osijek, Croatia
20:45 CEST	Modrić 52'	Report		Stadium: Opus Arena; Attendance: 12,612; Referee: François Letexier (France); Man of the Match: Luka Modrić

12 October 2024 2024–25 Nations League	Croatia	2–1	Scotland	Zagreb, Croatia
18:00 CEST	Matanović 36'; Kramarić 70'	Report	Christie 32'	Stadium: Stadion Maksimir; Attendance: 21,702; Referee: István Kovács (Romania)

15 October 2024 2024–25 Nations League	Poland	3–3	Croatia	Chorzów, Poland
20:45 CEST	Zieliński 5'; Zalewski 45'; Szymański 68'	Report	Sosa 19'; Sučić 24'; Baturina 26'; Livaković (red card) 76'	Stadium: Silesian Stadium; Attendance: 56,103; Referee: Alejandro Hernández Hernández (Spain)

15 November 2024 2024–25 Nations League	Scotland	1–0	Croatia	Glasgow, Scotland
20:45 CET (19:45 GMT)	McGinn 86'	Report	Sučić (yellow card) 30' (yellow-red card) 43'	Stadium: Hampden Park; Attendance: 48,810; Referee: Orel Grinfeld (Israel); Man of the Match: Ben Doak

18 November 2024 2024–25 Nations League	Croatia	1–1	Portugal	Split, Croatia
20:45 CET	Gvardiol 65'	Report	Félix 33'	Stadium: Stadion Poljud; Attendance: 33,386; Referee: Davide Massa (Italy)

=== 2025 ===
20 March 2025 2024–25 Nations League QF	Croatia	2–0	France	Split, Croatia
20:45 CET	Budimir 26'; Perišić 45+1'	Report		Stadium: Stadion Poljud; Attendance: 30,551; Referee: Espen Eskås (Norway)

23 March 2025 2024–25 Nations League QF	France	2–0 (2–2 agg.) (5–4 p)	Croatia	Saint-Denis, France
20:45 CET	Olise 52'; Dembélé 80'	Report		Stadium: Stade de France; Attendance: 77,502; Referee: Michael Oliver (England)
	Penalties
	Mbappé (penalty scored); Tchouaméni (penalty scored); Koundé (penalty missed); Kolo Muani (penalty scored); Hernandez (penalty missed); Doué (penalty scored); Upamecano (penalty scored)		(penalty missed) Baturina; (penalty scored) Moro; (penalty missed) Ivanović; (penalty scored) Mari. Pašalić; (penalty scored) Jakić; (penalty scored) Ćaleta-Car; (penalty missed) Stanišić

6 June 2025 2026 World Cup qualification	Gibraltar	0–7	Croatia	Faro/Loulé, Portugal
20:45 WEST		Report	Mari. Pašalić 28'; Budimir 30'; Ivanović 60', 63'; Perišić 73'; Kramarić 77', 80'	Stadium: Estádio Algarve; Attendance: 1,516; Referee: Georgi Kabakov (Bulgaria)

9 June 2025 2026 World Cup qualification	Croatia	5–1	Czech Republic	Osijek, Croatia
20:45 CEST	Kramarić 42', 75'; Modrić 62' (pen.); Perišić 68'; Budimir 72' (pen.)	Report	Souček 58'	Stadium: Opus Arena; Attendance: 12,207; Referee: Jesús Gil Manzano (Spain)

5 September 2025 2026 World Cup qualification	Faroe Islands	0–1	Croatia	Tórshavn, Faroe Islands
19:45 WEST		Report	Kramarić 31'	Stadium: Tórsvøllur; Attendance: 4,632; Referee: Kristo Tohver (Estonia)

8 September 2025 2026 World Cup qualification	Croatia	4–0	Montenegro	Zagreb, Croatia
20:45 CEST	Jakić 35'; Kramarić 51'; Kuč 85' (o.g.); Perišić 90+2'	Report		Stadium: Stadion Maksimir; Attendance: 21,209; Referee: Felix Zwayer (Germany)

9 October 2025 2026 World Cup qualification	Czech Republic	0–0	Croatia	Prague, Czech Republic
20:45 CEST		Report		Stadium: Fortuna Arena; Attendance: 18,870; Referee: François Letexier (France)

12 October 2025 2026 World Cup qualification	Croatia	3–0	Gibraltar	Varaždin, Croatia
20:45 CEST	Fruk 30'; Sucic 78'; Erlic 90+6'	Report		Stadium: Stadion Varteks; Attendance: 7,579; Referee: Oleksii Derevinskyi (Ukraine)

14 November 2025 2026 World Cup qualification	Croatia	3–1	Faroe Islands	Rijeka, Croatia
20:45 CET	Gvardiol 23'; Musa 57'; Vlašić 70'	Report	Turi 16'	Stadium: Stadion Rujevica; Attendance: 7,846; Referee: Aliyar Aghayev (Azerbaijan)

17 November 2025 2026 World Cup qualification	Montenegro	2–3	Croatia	Podgorica, Montenegro
20:45 CET	Osmajić 3'; Krstović 17'	Report	Perišić 37' (pen.); Jakić 72'; Vlašić 87'	Stadium: Podgorica City Stadium; Attendance: 4,673; Referee: Halil Umut Meler (Turkey)

=== 2026 ===
26 March 2026 Friendly	Colombia	1–2	Croatia	Orlando, United States
19:30 EDT	J. Arias 2'	Report	Vušković 6'; Matanović 42'	Stadium: Camping World Stadium; Attendance: 50,000; Referee: Rubiel Vazquez (United States)

31 March 2026 Friendly	Brazil	3–1	Croatia	Orlando, United States
20:00 EDT	Danilo 45+2'; Thiago 88' (pen.); Martinelli 90+2'	Report	Majer 84'	Stadium: Camping World Stadium; Attendance: 46,398; Referee: Armando Villarreal (United States)

2 June 2026 Friendly	Croatia	0–2	Belgium	Rijeka, Croatia
18:00 CEST		Report	Tielemans 38'; Lukaku 90+6'	Stadium: Stadion Rujevica; Attendance: 7,555; Referee: Rade Obrenović (Slovenia)

7 June 2026 Friendly	Croatia	2–1	Slovenia	Varaždin, Croatia
20:45 CEST	Modrić 51'; Mari. Pašalić 90+3'	Report	Šporar 83'	Stadium: Stadion Varteks; Attendance: 8,800; Referee: Bence Csonka (Hungary)

17 June 2026 2026 World Cup Group L	England	4–2	Croatia	Arlington, United States
15:00 EST	Kane 12' (pen.), 42'; Bellingham 47'; Rashford 85'	Report	Baturina 36'; Musa 45+5'	Stadium: AT&T Stadium; Attendance: 70,389; Referee: Clément Turpin (France)

23 June 2026 2026 World Cup Group L	Panama	0–1	Croatia	Toronto, Canada
19:00 EDT		Report	Budimir 54'	Stadium: BMO Field; Attendance: 43,036; Referee: Pierre Atcho (Gabon)

27 June 2026 2026 World Cup Group L	Croatia	2–1	Ghana	Philadelphia, United States
17:00 EDT	P. Sučić 31'; Vlašić 83'	Report	Luckassen 73'	Stadium: Lincoln Financial Field; Attendance: 68,324; Referee: Drew Fischer (Canada)

2 July 2026 2026 World Cup R32	Portugal	2–1	Croatia	Toronto, Canada
19:00 EDT	Ronaldo 68' (pen.); Ramos 90+4'	Report	Perišić 53'	Stadium: BMO Field; Attendance: 43,036; Referee: Espen Eskås (Norway)

26 September 2026 2026–27 Nations League	Czech Republic	1–2	Croatia	Prague, Czechia
21:00 CEST	Karabec 54'	Report	Modrić 47'; Pašalić 77'	Stadium: Fortuna Arena; Attendance: 15,421; Referee: Simone Sozza (Italy)

29 September 2026 2026–27 Nations League	Spain	4–1	Croatia	Seville, Spain
21:00 CEST	Yamal 2', 63'; Pubill 31'; Williams 89'	Report	Beljo 28'	Stadium: Ramón Sánchez-Pizjuán Stadium; Attendance: 40,294; Referee: Serdar Gözübüyük (Netherlands)

3 October 2026 2026–27 Nations League	Croatia	0–7	England	Rijeka, Croatia
18:00 CEST		Report	Kane 8', 53'; Bellingham 21'; Gordon 39'; Saka 45', 68'; Rogers 87'	Stadium: Stadion Rujevica; Attendance: 6,342; Referee: Sven Jablonski (Germany)

6 October 2026 2026–27 Nations League	Croatia	1–2	Spain	Split, Croatia
20:45 CEST	Perišić 17', (yellow card) 22' (yellow-red card) 79'	Report	Merino 61', 88'	Stadium: Stadion Poljud; Attendance: 32,690; Referee: Erik Lambrechts (Belgium)

12 November 2026 2026–27 Nations League	England	2–1	Croatia	London, England
19:45 GMT	Rogers 24'; Kane 64' (pen.)	Report	Sučić 59'	Stadium: Wembley Stadium; Attendance: 80,484; Referee: Morten Krogh (Denmark)

15 November 2026 2026–27 Nations League	Croatia	2–1	Czech Republic	Osijek, Croatia
20:45 CET	Perišić 2'; Majer 87'	Report	Hložek 84'	Stadium: Opus Arena; Attendance: 12,009; Referee: Luís Godinho (Portugal)

== Record per opponent ==
More wins than losses
As many wins as losses
Fewer wins than losses

Correct as of 15 November 2026, after the match against Czech Republic.

Opponent	Pld	W	D	L	GF	GA	GD	Win %
Albania	1	0	1	0	2	2	+0	0.00
Argentina	1	0	0	1	0	3	−3	0.00
Armenia	3	2	1	0	3	1	+2	66.67
Austria	2	1	0	1	3	4	−1	50.00
Brazil	2	0	1	1	2	4	−2	0.00
Belgium	3	0	1	2	0	3	−3	0.00
Bulgaria	1	1	0	0	2	1	+1	100.00
Canada	1	1	0	0	4	1	+3	100.00
Colombia	1	1	0	0	2	1	+1	100.00
Cyprus	2	2	0	0	4	0	+4	100.00
Czech Republic	5	3	2	0	10	4	+6	60.00
Denmark	2	2	0	0	3	1	+2	100.00
Egypt	1	1	0	0	4	2	+2	100.00
England	4	0	0	4	3	14	−11	0.00
Faroe Islands	2	2	0	0	4	1	+3	100.00
France	6	2	1	3	7	9	−2	33.33
Ghana	1	1	0	0	2	1	+1	100.00
Gibraltar	2	2	0	0	10	0	+10	100.00
Italy	1	0	1	0	1	1	+0	0.00
Japan	1	0	1	0	1	1	+0	0.00
Latvia	2	2	0	0	7	0	+7	100.00
Malta	2	2	0	0	10	1	+9	100.00
Montenegro	2	2	0	0	7	2	+5	100.00
Morocco	2	1	1	0	2	1	+1	50.00
Netherlands	1	1	0	0	4	2	+2	100.00
North Macedonia	1	1	0	0	3	0	+3	100.00
Panama	1	1	0	0	1	0	+1	100.00
Poland	2	1	1	0	4	3	+1	50.00
Portugal	6	1	1	4	8	13	−5	16.67
Russia	2	1	1	0	1	0	+1	50.00
Saudi Arabia	1	1	0	0	1	0	+1	100.00
Scotland	3	2	0	1	5	3	+2	66.67
Slovakia	2	1	1	0	3	2	+1	50.00
Slovenia	4	2	1	1	6	3	+3	50.00
Spain	5	0	1	4	5	14	−9	0.00
Sweden	2	1	0	1	3	3	+0	50.00
Switzerland	1	1	0	0	2	1	+1	100.00
Tunisia	1	0	1	0	0	0	+0	0.00
Turkey	3	1	1	1	5	4	+1	33.33
Wales	2	0	1	1	2	3	−1	0.00
Total: 40 teams played	87	43	19	25	146	109	+37	49.43
