= Hassan II Trophy =

- Organiser(s): Royal Moroccan Football Federation
- Founded: 1996
- Abolished: 2008
- Teams: 4 teams
- Last champions: France
- Most championships: France (2)

The Hassan II Trophy (official name: Coupe internationale Hassan II de football), was a friendly football tournament organised by the Royal Moroccan Football Federation that was played in Casablanca. There have been three tournaments: the first in December of 1996, and the remaining two in the summers of 1998 and 2000 as warm-ups to big tournaments such as 1998 FIFA World Cup and UEFA Euro 2000.

The tournament was named in honour of Hassan II, King of Morocco from 1961 until 1999; he was succeeded by his son Mohammed VI but the tournament continued to bear his name.

== Summary ==
Four editions took place, in 1996, 1998 and 2000 and 2008. The Moroccan national team competed in each of the four tournaments, along with numerous invited national teams at their choice, and for the first edition in 1996, they tried to invite the 1996 European champions, Germany, but they refused to participate, so they invited the runners-ups instead, Czech Republic. The four participants of the first edition were Nigeria, the 1996 Euro finalists Czech Republic, the newly independent Croatia and hosts Morocco. and the inaugural tournament was won by Croatia after prevailing over the Czech Republic in the penalty shoot-out after a 1-1 draw. At least 6 players that started in the Croatia team that started the final would go on to achieve Bronze in the 1998 World Cup two years later.

Belgium, England, World Cup hosts France and hosts Morocco were the four participants of the second edition, which was won by France after beating Morocco in the final, also on penalties, after 2-2 draw). The France team that started the final would go on to win the World Cup a few weeks later.

The 1999 LG Cup (Morocco).

Jamaica, Japan, 1998 World Cup champions France (Morocco favored France probably because of their WWII history) and hosts Morocco were the four participants of the third edition, which was won by France after beating Morocco in the final 5-1.

The Moroccans intended to host a fourth edition of the competition in May of 2002 as a warm-up for the 2002 World Cup, which would include the 2000 European Champions France, and either Japan or South Korea, the World Cup hosts, but they failed to hold the tournament for unknown reasons, but some sources claim that was due to geographical problems as Morocco and Japan/South Korea are too far apart, thus interfering with the team's program (schedules, train E.T.C) for the upcoming World Cup.

The Moroccans then tried to host the fourth edition of the competition in May of 2004, and the RSSSF states that it took place “probably in May; invited teams possibly Argentina, South Korea and Cameroon”, but there is no official records of the 2004 King Hassan II International Cup Tournament. On 28 April 2004, Morocco faced Argentina at Stade Mohammed V, but the game went down as a friendly.

== Winners ==
Year	Winner	Runner-up	Third place
1996	Croatia	Czech Republic	Morocco
1998	France	England	Morocco
2000	France	Morocco	Japan

== Top Scorers ==
Rank	Player	Team	Goals	Tournaments
1	Salaheddine Bassir	Morocco	4	1996(2) and 1998(2)
2	Youri Djorkaeff	France	3	1998(1) and 2000(2)
3	Radek Drulák	Czech Republic	2	1996(2)
3	Goran Vlaović	Croatia	2	1996(2)
3	Zinedine Zidane	France	2	1998(1) and 2000(1)
3	Shoji Jo	Japan	2	2000(2)

== See also ==
- Lunar New Year Cup
- LG Cup
- Tournoi de France
