= Nikola Jerkan =

Croatian footballer

Personal information
- Date of birth: 8 December 1964 (age 61)
- Place of birth: Split, SR Croatia, Yugoslavia
- Height: 1.88 m (6 ft 2 in)
- Position: Defender

Team information
- Current team: Croatia (scout)

Senior career*
Years	Team	Apps	(Gls)
1982–1986	NK Zagreb	19	(0)
1986–1988	Dinamo Vinkovci	56	(2)
1988–1990	Hajduk Split	64	(1)
1990–1996	Real Oviedo	203	(1)
1996–1999	Nottingham Forest	14	(0)
1997–1998	→ Rapid Wien (loan)	21	(0)
1999–2000	Charleroi	36	(0)
Total		413	(4)

International career
1992–1997	Croatia	31	(1)
- * Club domestic league appearances and goals

Nikola Jerkan (born 8 December 1964) is a Croatian former professional footballer who played as a defender. He started playing football professionally for NK Zagreb.

== Playing career ==
=== Club ===
Jerkan was born in Split. He started his career in youth ranks of Junak Sinj. In 1982 he moved to NK Zagreb where he played until 1986. Then, he moved to Dinamo Vinkovci where he would spend two years before moving to Hajduk Split in 1988. Immediately he started playing for the first team and played two seasons before he moved to Real Oviedo in Spain in 1990. In 1991, in his second season there, he was selected for the best defender of La Liga.

Jerkan joined Nottingham Forest in the summer of 1996 for a fee of £1 million. Jerkan's time at Nottingham Forest was disappointing. He struggled to hold down a first-team place and after the departures of Frank Clark and Stuart Pearce, never hit it off with new manager Dave Bassett. He made 14 appearances for Forest (all Premier League starts), but none after March 1997.

He went on a year-long loan to Rapid Wien of Austria at the start of the 1997–98 season and was never seen in the English game again. He spent the 1998–99 season at the City Ground but played no games.

In 1999, he moved to Charleroi where he played during the next two seasons, and then retired. He then moved to live in Oviedo.

=== International ===
Jerkan made his debut for Croatia in a July 1992 friendly match away against Australia and attained 31 caps, scoring one goal (against Lithuania in Zagreb during the qualifications for Euro 96). He played three games at Euro 96 and was at that point established in the centre of the Croatian defence. His final international was a June 1997 Kirin Cup match against Turkey.

== Managerial career ==
Jerkan managed Real Avilés B for two seasons, securing the club's first ever promotion to the Tercera División (fourth tier). He also was assistant manager to Zlatko Dalić for Croatia at UEFA Euro 2020.

== Honours ==
=== Orders ===
- Order of Danica Hrvatska with face of Franjo Bučar – 1995
