= Radek Drulák =

Czech footballer (born 1962)

Personal information
- Date of birth: 12 January 1962 (age 64)
- Place of birth: Hulín, Czechoslovakia
- Height: 1.81 m (5 ft 11 in)
- Position: Striker

Youth career
- 1968–1977: Spartak Hulín
- 1977–1981: TJ Gottwaldov

Senior career*
Years	Team	Apps	(Gls)
1981	RH Cheb	13	(1)
1982	RH Sušice		
1982–1987	RH Cheb	109	(37)
1987–1990	Sigma Olomouc	78	(52)
1991–1993	VfB Oldenburg	83	(50)
1993–1994	Chemnitzer FC	18	(0)
1994–1996	Petra Drnovice	69	(50)
1997	FC Linz	9	(3)
1997–1998	Sigma Olomouc	25	(10)
1999	FK Holice 1932		

International career
1984–1989	Czechoslovakia	3	(0)
1995–1997	Czech Republic	16	(6)

Managerial career
- 2016: ASKÖ Oedt
- 2018–2020: Bohuňovice
Medal record
Men's football
Representing Czech Republic
UEFA European Championship
Runner-up	1996 England
- * Club domestic league appearances and goals

Radek Drulák (born 12 January 1962) is a Czech former football player. A forward, Drulák twice finished top scorer of the Czech First League, as well as once in the German 2. Bundesliga. Drulák represented his country 19 times and participated in UEFA Euro 1996 where the Czechs won a silver medal.

== Club career ==
Drulák started his professional career in the Czechoslovak First League, playing for RH Cheb between 1981 and 1987. He then played for Sigma Olomouc from the 1987–88 season, scoring a hat trick four times, as well as scoring four in another game. Between December 1990 and June 1994, Drulák had a spell abroad, playing for German clubs VfB Oldenburg and Chemnitzer FC. During this time, he became the leading goalscorer of the 2. Bundesliga whilst playing for VfB Oldenburg.

Drulák returned to his homeland in 1994, signing for Petra Drnovice. He was the top goalscorer of the Czech First League in the 1994–95 and 1995–96 seasons, scoring 15 and 22 goals respectively. Drulák won the Czech Footballer of the Year in 1995 and Personality of the League award at the Czech Footballer of the Year awards in 1996.

== International career ==
At international level, Drulák played for Czechoslovakia, making his debut on 28 March 1984 in a friendly match against West Germany. Drulák played his first match for the newly-formed Czech Republic national football team on 7 June 1995 in a UEFA Euro 1996 qualifying against Luxembourg. He played 16 matches for the Czech Republic and scored six goals. Including his games for Czechoslovakia, he made 19 international appearances.

== Personal life ==
Drulák is married and has a brother who is ten years older than him. His son, also named Radek, was also a professional footballer, and played together with his father in lower league competition for Velké Bílovice in 2007. The family lives in Olomouc.

== Career statistics ==
=== International ===
Appearances and goals by national team and year
National team	Year	Apps	Goals
Czechoslovakia	1984	2	0
Czechoslovakia	1989	1	0
Czechoslovakia	Total	3	0
Czech Republic	1995	7	4
Czech Republic	1996	8	2
Czech Republic	Total	15	6
Career total		18	6

Scores and results list Czech Republic's goal tally first, score column indicates score after each Drulák goal.

List of international goals scored by Radek Drulák
No.	Date	Venue	Opponent	Score	Result	Competition	Ref.
1	6 September 1995	Stadion Letná, Prague, Czech Republic	Norway	2–0	2–0	UEFA Euro 1996 qualifying	
2	15 November 1995	Stadion Letná, Prague, Czech Republic	Luxembourg	1–0	3–0	UEFA Euro 1996 qualifying	
3	15 November 1995	Stadion Letná, Prague, Czech Republic	Luxembourg	2–0	3–0	UEFA Euro 1996 qualifying	
4	13 December 1995	Al Kuwait Sports Club Stadium, Kuwait City, Kuwait	Kuwait	2–0	2–1	Friendly	
5	11 December 1996	Stade Mohammed V, Casablanca, Morocco	Nigeria	1–0	2–1	Friendly	
6	12 December 1996	Stade Mohammed V, Casablanca, Morocco	Croatia	1–0	1–1	Friendly	
