= UEFA Euro 1996 final =

Final game of the UEFA Euro 1996

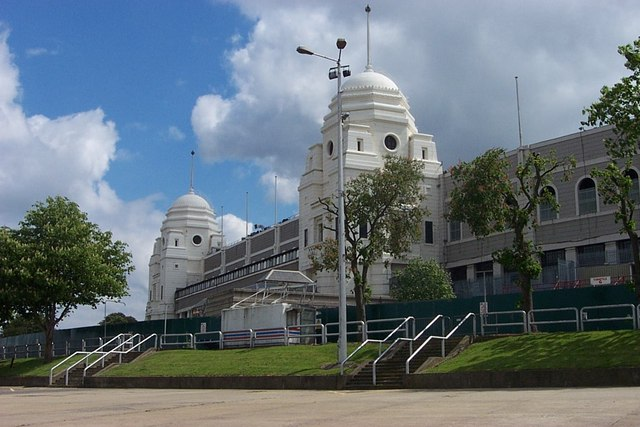
- The final took place at the old Wembley Stadium in London (pictured in 2002).
- Event: UEFA Euro 1996
Czech Republic	Germany
1	2
- After golden goal extra time
- Date: 30 June 1996
- Venue: Wembley Stadium, London
- Man of the Match: Karel Poborský (Czech Republic)
- Referee: Pierluigi Pairetto (Italy)
- Attendance: 73,611

The UEFA Euro 1996 final was the final match of UEFA Euro 1996, the tenth European Championship, UEFA's top football competition for national teams. The match was played at Wembley Stadium in London, England, on 30 June 1996, and was contested between the Czech Republic and Germany.

En route to the final, both sides had been drawn in Group C, alongside Italy and Russia; Germany would defeat the Czech Republic 2–0 in their opening game and then go on to win the group, with the Czech Republic finishing second. Germany then defeated Croatia in the quarter-finals, before progressing to the final following a penalty shoot-out victory over hosts England in the semi-finals. Meanwhile, the Czech Republic beat Portugal in the quarter-finals, before overcoming France in the semi-finals, also via a penalty shoot-out.

The final took place in front of 73,611 spectators, and was refereed by Pierluigi Pairetto from Italy. The full-time score was 1–1, sending the match into extra time; in the 95th minute, Oliver Bierhoff scored the golden goal for Germany, his second of the match, ending the contest in a 2–1 German victory and securing their record third European Championship title.

== Background ==
UEFA Euro 1996 was the tenth edition of the UEFA European Football Championship, UEFA's football competition for national teams. Qualifying rounds were played on a home-and-away round-robin tournament basis prior to the final tournament taking place in England, between 8 and 30 June 1996. The sixteen qualified teams were divided into four groups of four with each team playing one another once. The winners of each group then faced the runners-up from other groups in quarter-finals, the winners progressing to the semi-finals; the victorious teams there qualified for the final.

In the previous international tournament, the 1994 FIFA World Cup, the Czech Republic were represented as the Czechoslovakia national football team, but failed to qualify for the finals, finishing in third place in group 4, behind Romania and Belgium. Germany were knocked out in the quarter-finals by Bulgaria. The UEFA Euro 1996 Final was the second meeting between the sides, with the first coming in the group stage. The sides had met one another seventeen times (as Germany against Czechoslovakia), with Germany winning ten, Czechoslovakia winning four and the remainder ending in a draw. The UEFA Euro 1996 Final marked Germany's fifth final in seven European Championships while the Czech Republic were making their first appearance in the tournament decider.

== Route to the final ==
=== Czech Republic ===
The Czech Republic were assigned to UEFA Euro 1996 Group C where their opponents were Germany, Italy and Russia. The high quality of the teams in the group led The Guardian in 2007 to call it the "'deadliest' group of death" at a European Championship or World Cup. The first group match saw the Czech Republic face Germany at Old Trafford in Manchester on 9 June 1996. Germany took the lead in the 26th minute through Christian Ziege who ran with the ball along the left wing before cutting inside Miroslav Kadlec and shooting into the bottom corner of the Czech Republic goal. Six minutes later, Germany doubled their lead with a similar goal from Andreas Möller. Pavel Nedvěd then struck Karel Poborský's cross over the bar, but the Czech Republic failed to threaten further and the match ended 2–0, with their manager Dušan Uhrin suggesting that the "players were just overawed." During the match, the referee David Elleray booked ten players, six from Germany and four from the Czech Republic, and Germany lost Jürgen Kohler for the remainder of the tournament after suffering a knee injury.

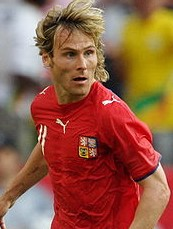
Pavel Nedvěd (pictured in 2006) scored two goals in the group stage for the Czech Republic.

The Czech Republic's second game was against Italy and took place at Anfield in Liverpool on 14 June 1996. Italy made several changes to their starting lineup from their previous match, a 2–1 victory over Russia, and the Czech Republic took the lead after just four minutes. Poborský avoided Paolo Maldini's tackle and crossed for Nedvěd who controlled the ball on his chest and scored past Angelo Peruzzi, the Italy goalkeeper. Alessandro Costacurta then appeared to handle the ball but no penalty was awarded, and immediately Diego Fuser dispossessed Jan Suchopárek, ran with the ball before crossing to Enrico Chiesa who equalised. In the 28th minute, Italy were reduced to ten players when Luigi Apolloni was sent off after being shown a second yellow card for a foul on Pavel Kuka. Seven minutes later, Kuka's cross was missed by Maldini and volleyed into the Italy goal by Radek Bejbl, to give the Czech Republic the lead. There were several chances for the Czech Republic in the second half to extend their lead but the final opportunity to score fell to Italy's Pierluigi Casiraghi who struck the ball off-target from a Gianfranco Zola pass in stoppage time, and the match ended 2–1 to the Czech Republic.

The final group match for the Czech Republic saw them play Russia at Anfield on 19 June 1996. The Czech Republic were 2–0 ahead within the first 20 minutes of the game. Suchopárek's sixth-minute header gave them the lead before Kuka headed Jiří Němec's long ball into the Russia goal. Further chances to score fell to the Czech Republic who dominated the remainder of the half, hitting the frame of the Russia goal three times, but the score remained 2–0 at the interval. Russia made two tactical substitutions at half-time, with Vladimir Beschastnykh and Aleksandr Mostovoi coming on for Igor Kolyvanov and Igor Simutenkov, and within three minutes, Mostovoi had reduced Russia's deficit, heading in from a Dmitri Khokhlov cross. Four minutes later, Němec fouled Vladislav Radimov but the ball broke to Omari Tetradze who shot from close range, the ball taking a deflection off the Czech Republic goalkeeper Petr Kouba before ending in the goal. Poborský then hit the post before the substitute, Beschastnykh, scored from distance to make it 3–2 to Russia in the 85th minute. With two minutes remaining, Luboš Kubík's lofted pass found Vladimír Šmicer whose shot passed Stanislav Cherchesov in the Russia goal, to ensure a 3–3 final score. The Czech Republic ended the group stage as runners-up and progressed to the next round.

In the quarter-final, the Czech Republic's opponents were Portugal and the match was held at Villa Park in Birmingham on 23 June 1996. In a first half of few opportunities, Portugal's Ricardo Sá Pinto struck his side's only chance straight at Kouba, and the first half ended goalless. Eight minutes into the second half, the Czech Republic took the lead with what author Jonathan O'Brien described as "one of the most astonishing goals ever witnessed in a major tournament." Poborský received the ball from Němec before dribbling past four Portugal players and then striking a high lob over Vítor Baía, the Spain goalkeeper, who was off his goalline. In 2016, UEFA included the goal in their list of the "ten great Euro moments". The Czech Republic had four players booked and Radoslav Látal was sent off late in the game for a foul on Dimas, but secured a 1–0 victory and a place in the semi-final.

The Czech Republic played France in the semi-final at Old Trafford on 26 June 1996. Látal, Kuka, Bejbl and Suchopárek were all unavailable for the Czech Republic through suspension. The first half was devoid of any chances of note and ended goalless. Fifteen minutes after the interval, Youri Djorkaeff had two opportunities to score, firstly striking the bar before volleying a cross from Zinedine Zidane over the Czech Republic crossbar. Hugh McIlvanney, writing in The Times, described the match as a "seemingly endless exercise in negativity". With the full-time score 0–0, the match went into extra time where, late on, Djorkaeff's cross was sliced wide by Laurent Blanc and a penalty shoot-out was required to determine the winner. Both sides scored their first five penalties, before Kadlec made it 6–5 to the Czech Republic. Reynald Pedros struck his penalty against Kouba's legs and the Czech Republic progressed to their first European Championship final.

=== Germany ===
Also in Group C, Germany's first group match ended in a 2–0 victory against the Czech Republic at Old Trafford. In their second game, Germany faced Russia, once again at Old Trafford, on 16 June 1996. The day before, a bomb was detonated in Manchester city centre by the Irish Republican Army which initially placed the match in doubt. However, the ground was guarded overnight, security searches were made for suspicious objects and the game went ahead. In the first half, Ilya Tsymbalar's shot struck the Germany post and Kolyvanov headed the rebound straight at the Germany goalkeeper Andreas Köpke. Just before the interval, Mostovoi appeared to be fouled by Köpke in the penalty area but the referee did not award a penalty and Kolyvanov's subsequent shot was too high. Eleven minutes into the second half, Germany took the lead through Matthias Sammer. His initial shot from a Möller pass was saved by the Russia goalkeeper Dmitri Kharine but he scored from the rebound. Russia were then reduced to ten men as Yuri Kovtun was sent off for a foul on Dieter Eilts before Jürgen Klinsmann doubled Germany's lead with 13 minutes remaining, striking the ball with the outside of his boot into the top corner of the Russia goal. In the final moments of the match, Klinsmann scored again to give Germany a 3–0 victory.

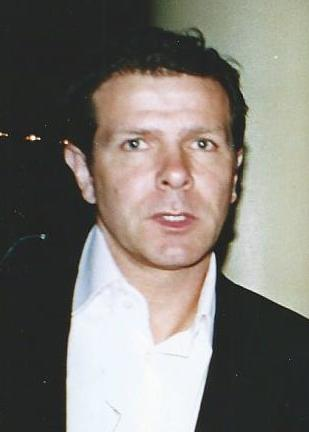
Andreas Möller (pictured in 2005) scored the winning penalty for Germany in the semi-final.

Germany's opposition in their final group match were Italy and the game was played on 19 June 1996 at Old Trafford. Early in the game, Köpke saved a volley from Fuser before Casiraghi charged down a clearance from Sammer and was fouled by the Germany goalkeeper. Zola took the penalty but it was easily saved by Köpke. Despite having the majority of possession, Italy failed to create many chances to score, although Köpke saved shots from both Fuser and Roberto Donadoni. With half an hour remaining, Germany's Thomas Strunz was sent off after being shown a second yellow when he fouled Donadoni. The match ended 0–0 and Germany ended the group stage at the top of the table to progress to the next round.

In the quarter-finals, Germany faced Croatia at Old Trafford on 23 June 1996. In a bad-tempered match, Klinsmann gave Germany the lead from the penalty spot after Nikola Jerkan handled the ball in the Croatia penalty area. Having been fouled earlier by Igor Štimac, Klinsmann was forced off injured in the 38th minute and was replaced by Steffen Freund. Early in the second half, his clearance was blocked by Nikola Jurčević and the ball fell to Davor Šuker who took the ball round Köpke to score the equaliser. Štimac was sent off before the hour mark for a foul on Mehmet Scholl and soon after Germany took the lead when Sammer converted Scholl's cross. Although Scholl himself missed a late chance to score after being played in by Stefan Kuntz, Germany won the match 2–1 to progress to the last four.

Germany's opponents in the semi-finals were England and the match was played at Wembley Stadium on 26 June 1996 in front of 75,862 spectators. Three minutes into the match, Köpke conceded a corner from a Paul Ince volley which was taken by Paul Gascoigne. Tony Adams flicked the ball on and Alan Shearer headed it into the Germany goal to give England a 1–0 lead. In the 16th minute, Thomas Helmer played a one-two with Möller before playing a low cross to Kuntz who beat Stuart Pearce to the ball to equalise. Shearer then headed off-target twice while Stefan Reuter kept out another England set piece from a corner. In the second half, Helmer's shot went over the England crossbar and with ten minutes remaining, Möller was booked for his reaction to Pearce fouling him and picking him up off the ground, ruling him out of the final should Germany have qualified. The match ended 1–1 and went into extra time. Darren Anderton hit the Germany post after beating Köpke to a Steve McManaman cross but the German goalkeeper caught the rebound. David Seaman then saved from Möller before Kuntz saw his goal disallowed for shirt-pulling. Shearer's late cross passed Köpke but Gascoigne's outstretched left foot just missed the ball, and after Adams' header was cleared by Eilts, the game went to a penalty shoot-out. Both sides scored their first five, before England's Gareth Southgate saw his weak penalty saved. Möller then scored to secure a 6–5 victory to Germany and progression to their fifth European Championship final in seven tournaments.

=== Summary ===
Czech Republic
Round
Germany
Opponent
Result
Group stage
Opponent
Result
Germany
0–2
Match 1
Czech Republic
2–0
Italy
2–1
Match 2
Russia
3–0
Russia
3–3
Match 3
Italy
0–0
Group C runners-up

Pos	Team	Pld	Pts
1	Germany	3	7
2	Czech Republic	3	4
3	Italy	3	4
4	Russia	3	1

Source: UEFA
Final standings
Group C winners

Pos	Team	Pld	Pts
1	Germany	3	7
2	Czech Republic	3	4
3	Italy	3	4
4	Russia	3	1

Source: UEFA
Opponent
Result
Knockout stage
Opponent
Result
Portugal
1–0
Quarter-finals
Croatia
2–1
France
0–0 (a.e.t.) (6–5 p)
Semi-finals
England
1–1 (a.e.t.) (6–5 p)

== Match ==
=== Pre-match ===
Möller and Reuter were unavailable for Germany through suspension, replaced by Strunz and Thomas Häßler. Klinsmann, Eilts, Helmer and Ziege were not fully fit but selected nonetheless, and four other Germany players were out with long-term injuries. Oliver Kahn and Oliver Reck, both substitute goalkeepers, were given outfield player shirts. As a result of the depletion, both managers were given dispensation by UEFA to call up two additional players: Vogts added Jens Todt to his squad while Uhrin declined the offer. Suchopárek, Bejbl and Kuka were recalled to the Czech Republic line-up having served their suspensions, Karel Rada kept his position as Látal was unavailable having been sent off in the quarter-final, and Patrik Berger returned to the starting eleven replacing Šmicer.

=== Summary ===
The final took place at Wembley Stadium on 30 June 1996 in front of 73,611 spectators, and was refereed by Pierluigi Pairetto. Germany controlled the early stages of the match but the first opportunity to score fell to the Czech Republic when Kuka took the ball past Markus Babbel on the left wing before crossing it to Poborský who volleyed it over the Germany crossbar. Berger also missed a chance and in the 34th minute Germany almost took the lead when a volley from Kuntz beat Kouba but was cleared by Rada. With four minutes of the half remaining, Ziege passed to Kuntz but Kouba came out of his goal to cut out the opportunity. Kuka then won the ball from Eilts but Köpke saved. Just before the interval, Eilts was injured while tackling Němec and was carried off the pitch on a stretcher, and the half ended goalless.

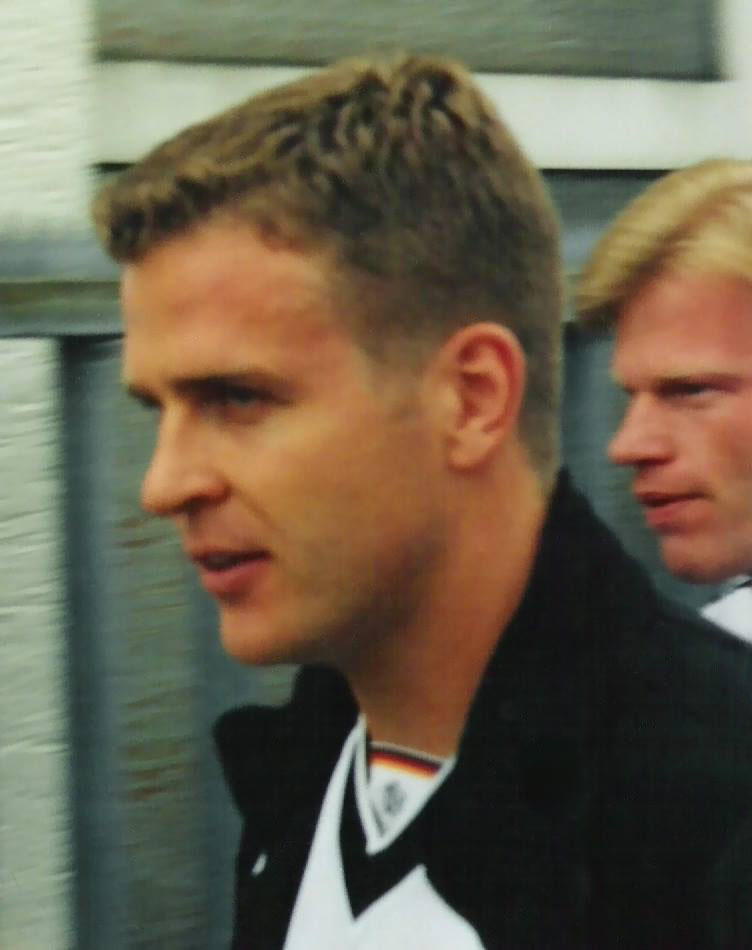
Oliver Bierhoff (pictured c. 1999) scored the golden goal.

Marco Bode came on for Germany at the start of the second half to replace Eilts. In the 50th minute, Scholl passed to Strunz whose shot from outside the Czech Republic penalty area was too high. Kuka then passed to Berger whose shot took a deflection off Sammer and was easily gathered by Köpke. In the 58th minute, the Czech Republic were awarded a penalty. Sammer's lofted pass was headed clear by Nedvěd and was collected by Kuka; he passed it to Poborský who was brought down by Sammer, and although the initial contact took place outside the Germany box, the referee awarded the spot kick which Berger scored with a shot that went under Köpke. Ten minutes later, Germany made their second substitution of the game with Scholl being replaced by Oliver Bierhoff, and within five minutes he scored. Ziege sent in a curling free kick from the right and Bierhoff headed a low ball past Kouba from around 6 yards (5 m). Klinsmann's late shot was blocked by Rada before Köpke dived full-length to keep out a strike from Šmicer, who had replaced Poborský moments earlier, and full-time ended 1–1, sending the match into extra time: the golden goal rule applied such that the first team to score in the additional period would immediately win the game.

Berger had the first chance to score but his shot early in the first period of extra time went outside the near post. In the 95th minute, Klinsmann passed to Bierhoff who had his back to goal and was being closely marked by Kadlec; the German striker turned and struck the ball which took a deflection off Michal Horňák and passed through Kouba's hands into the Czech Republic net. After confirming with the linesman that Kuntz was not offside, the referee blew to indicate the end of the match with Germany winning 2–1 and securing their third European Championship title.

=== Details ===
30 June 1996
19:00 BST

Czech Republic	1–2 (a.e.t./g.g.)	Germany
Berger 59' (pen.)	Report	Bierhoff 73', 95'

Wembley Stadium, London
Attendance: 73,611
Referee: Pierluigi Pairetto (Italy)

Czech Republic	Germany

GK	1	Petr Kouba
SW	5	Miroslav Kadlec (c)
CB	15	Michal Horňák	(yellow card) 47'
CB	3	Jan Suchopárek
CM	4	Pavel Nedvěd
CM	13	Radek Bejbl
CM	19	Karel Rada
RW	8	Karel Poborský		(substituted off) 88'
AM	14	Patrik Berger
LW	7	Jiří Němec
CF	9	Pavel Kuka
Substitutions:
MF	17	Vladimír Šmicer		(substituted on) 88'
Manager:
Dušan Uhrin

GK	1	Andreas Köpke
SW	6	Matthias Sammer	(yellow card) 69'
CB	14	Markus Babbel
CB	5	Thomas Helmer	(yellow card) 63'
RWB	19	Thomas Strunz
LWB	17	Christian Ziege	(yellow card) 91'
DM	21	Dieter Eilts		(substituted off) 46'
AM	8	Mehmet Scholl		(substituted off) 69'
AM	10	Thomas Häßler
CF	18	Jürgen Klinsmann (c)
CF	11	Stefan Kuntz
Substitutions:
MF	3	Marco Bode		(substituted on) 46'
FW	20	Oliver Bierhoff		(substituted on) 69'
Manager:
Berti Vogts

== Post-match ==
The Czech Republic's Poborský was awarded the inaugural Euro man of the match award. Germany's Köpke, Sammer and Eilts, along with the Czech Republic's Poborský were named in the UEFA team of the tournament.

Bierhoff later recalled, "When you're so close to the goal at such a decisive stage of the match, you just give everything you’ve got to finish. It was a mixture of instinct, a good sense of orientation and single-mindedness." Kohler regarded the victory as a vindication of Vogts' tough managerial style, suggesting "mentally, we were beasts." Upon their return to Germany, the team celebrated by singing the English football anthem "Three Lions". Šmicer later noted that he thought "Germany deserved to win it because of their consistency, and quality of course" but that his team returned to the Czech Republic "as winners ... a great moment, a great homecoming. We gave everything, no regrets. It was special for us."

In the next international tournament, the 1998 FIFA World Cup, Germany were knocked out at the quarter-final stage by Croatia. The Czech Republic failed to progress beyond their qualifying group, finishing in third place behind Spain and FR Yugoslavia.

== See also ==
- Czech Republic at the UEFA European Championship
- Germany at the UEFA European Championship
