= UEFA Euro 1996 Group C =

Football tournament group stage

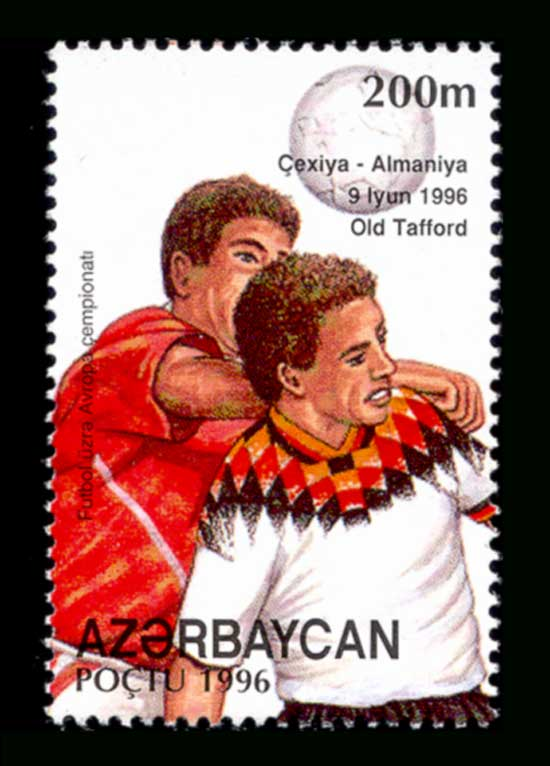
The match between the Czech Republic and Germany, commemorated on an Azerbaijani postage stamp

Group C of UEFA Euro 1996 was one of four groups in the final tournament's initial group stage. It began on 9 June and was completed on 19 June. The group consisted of Germany, Italy, the Czech Republic and Russia.

Using FIFA World Rankings as a measure of the strength of the teams, The Guardian calculated in 2007 that the strongest "Group of Death" of all time was the Euro 1996 Group C. The teams (and world rankings) were Germany (2), Russia (3), Italy (7) and the Czech Republic (10). This record was surpassed by the May 2012 rankings for Euro 2012 Group B, with Germany (2), the Netherlands (4), Portugal (5) and Denmark (10), but not the June rankings immediately before the tournament (3, 4, 10 and 9 respectively).

Germany won the group and advanced to the quarter-finals, along with the Czech Republic. Italy and Russia failed to advance.

== Teams ==
Draw position	Team	Method of qualification	Date of qualification	Finals appearance	Last appearance	Previous best performance	FIFA Rankings May 1996
C1 (seed)	Germany (Note: From 1972 to 1988, Germany competed as West Germany.)	Group 7 winner	15 November 1995	7th	1992	Winners (1972, 1980)	2
C2	Czech Republic (Note: From 1960 to 1980, the Czech Republic competed as Czechoslovakia.)	Group 5 winner	15 November 1995	4th	1980	Winners (1976)	10
C3	Italy	Group 4 runner-up (1st best runner-up)	15 November 1995	4th	1988	Winners (1968)	7
C4	Russia (Note: From 1960 to 1988, Russia competed as the Soviet Union, and in 1992 as CIS.)	Group 8 winner	15 November 1995	7th	1992	Winners (1960)	3

== Standings ==
Pos	Team	Pld	W	D	L	GF	GA	GD	Pts	Qualification
1	Germany	3	2	1	0	5	0	+5	7	Advance to knockout stage
2	Czech Republic	3	1	1	1	5	6	−1	4 (Note: Head-to-head result: Czech Republic 2–1 Italy.)	Advance to knockout stage
3	Italy	3	1	1	1	3	3	0	4	
4	Russia	3	0	1	2	4	8	−4	1	

Source: UEFA
Rules for classification: Group stage tiebreakers
Notes:

In the quarter-finals,

- The winner of Group C, Germany, advanced to play the runner-up of Group D, Croatia.
- The runner-up of Group C, Czech Republic, advanced to play the winner of Group D, Portugal.

== Matches ==
=== Germany vs Czech Republic ===
9 June 1996
17:00

Germany	2–0	Czech Republic
Ziege 26'; Möller 32'	Report

Old Trafford, Manchester
Attendance: 37,300
Referee: David Elleray (England)

Germany	Czech Republic

GK	1	Andreas Köpke
SW	6	Matthias Sammer
CB	5	Thomas Helmer
CB	15	Jürgen Kohler (c)		(substituted off) 14'
DM	21	Dieter Eilts
RM	2	Stefan Reuter	(yellow card) 69'
CM	7	Andreas Möller	(yellow card) 58'
CM	10	Thomas Häßler	(yellow card) 77'
LM	17	Christian Ziege	(yellow card) 28'
SS	9	Fredi Bobic		(substituted off) 65'
CF	11	Stefan Kuntz	(yellow card) 52'	(substituted off) 83'
Substitutions:
DF	14	Markus Babbel	(yellow card) 59'	(substituted on) 14'
MF	19	Thomas Strunz		(substituted on) 65'
FW	20	Oliver Bierhoff		(substituted on) 83'
Manager:
Berti Vogts

GK	1	Petr Kouba
SW	15	Michal Horňák
RB	2	Radoslav Látal
CB	3	Jan Suchopárek
CB	5	Miroslav Kadlec (c)	(yellow card) 67'
LB	13	Radek Bejbl	(yellow card) 19'
DM	7	Jiří Němec
RM	8	Karel Poborský		(substituted off) 46'
CM	11	Martin Frýdek		(substituted off) 46'
LM	4	Pavel Nedvěd	(yellow card) 45'
CF	9	Pavel Kuka
Substitutions:
MF	14	Patrik Berger		(substituted on) 46'
FW	10	Radek Drulák	(yellow card) 67'	(substituted on) 46'
Manager:
Dušan Uhrin

Man of the Match:
Matthias Sammer (Germany)

Assistant referees:
Anthony Bates (England)
Peter Walton (England)
Fourth official:
Stephen Lodge (England)

=== Italy vs Russia ===
11 June 1996
16:30

Italy	2–1	Russia
Casiraghi 5', 52'	Report	Tsymbalar 21'

Anfield, Liverpool
Attendance: 35,120
Referee: Leslie Mottram (Scotland)

Italy	Russia

GK	1	Angelo Peruzzi
RB	8	Roberto Mussi
CB	5	Alessandro Costacurta
CB	2	Luigi Apolloni
LB	3	Paolo Maldini (c)
CM	10	Demetrio Albertini	(yellow card) 14'
RM	15	Angelo Di Livio		(substituted off) 62'
CM	16	Roberto Di Matteo
LM	14	Alessandro Del Piero		(substituted off) 46'
SS	21	Gianfranco Zola
CF	18	Pierluigi Casiraghi		(substituted off) 80'
Substitutions:
MF	7	Roberto Donadoni	(yellow card) 83'	(substituted on) 46'
MF	17	Diego Fuser		(substituted on) 62'
FW	20	Fabrizio Ravanelli		(substituted on) 80'
Manager:
Arrigo Sacchi

GK	12	Stanislav Cherchesov
RB	2	Omari Tetradze
CB	7	Viktor Onopko (c)	(yellow card) 8'
CB	13	Yevgeni Bushmanov		(substituted off) 46'
LB	5	Yuri Kovtun	(yellow card) 82'
RM	8	Andrei Kanchelskis
CM	6	Valery Karpin		(substituted off) 63'
CM	19	Vladislav Radimov
LM	4	Ilya Tsymbalar		(substituted off) 71'
AM	10	Aleksandr Mostovoi
CF	9	Igor Kolyvanov	(yellow card) 31'
Substitutions:
DF	18	Igor Yanovsky		(substituted on) 46'
FW	11	Sergei Kiriakov		(substituted on) 63'
MF	14	Igor Dobrovolski		(substituted on) 71'
Manager:
Oleg Romantsev

Man of the Match:
Pierluigi Casiraghi (Italy)

Assistant referees:
Robert Orr (Scotland)
John Fleming (Scotland)
Fourth official:
Hugh Dallas (Scotland)

=== Czech Republic vs Italy ===
14 June 1996
19:30

Czech Republic	2–1	Italy
Nedvěd 5'; Bejbl 35'	Report	Chiesa 18'

Anfield, Liverpool
Attendance: 37,320
Referee: Antonio López Nieto (Spain)

Czech Republic	Italy

GK	1	Petr Kouba
SW	15	Michal Horňák
CB	3	Jan Suchopárek	(yellow card) 20'
CB	5	Miroslav Kadlec (c)	(yellow card) 90'
RM	2	Radoslav Látal	(yellow card) 50'	(substituted off) 88'
CM	7	Jiří Němec
CM	13	Radek Bejbl
LM	4	Pavel Nedvěd
RF	8	Karel Poborský
CF	9	Pavel Kuka	(yellow card) 59'
LF	14	Patrik Berger		(substituted off) 64'
Substitutions:
MF	17	Vladimír Šmicer		(substituted on) 64'
MF	6	Václav Němeček		(substituted on) 88'
Manager:
Dušan Uhrin

GK	1	Angelo Peruzzi
RB	8	Roberto Mussi
CB	5	Alessandro Costacurta
CB	2	Luigi Apolloni	(red card) 29'
LB	3	Paolo Maldini (c)
RM	17	Diego Fuser	(yellow card) 90'
CM	10	Demetrio Albertini
CM	11	Dino Baggio		(substituted off) 39'
LM	7	Roberto Donadoni
CF	19	Enrico Chiesa		(substituted off) 78'
CF	20	Fabrizio Ravanelli		(substituted off) 58'
Substitutions:
DF	4	Amedeo Carboni		(substituted on) 39'
FW	18	Pierluigi Casiraghi		(substituted on) 58'
FW	21	Gianfranco Zola		(substituted on) 78'
Manager:
Arrigo Sacchi

Man of the Match:
Radek Bejbl (Czech Republic)

Assistant referees:
Victoriano Giráldez Carrasco (Spain)
Manuel López Fernández (Spain)
Fourth official:
Juan Ansuátegui Roca (Spain)

=== Russia vs Germany ===
16 June 1996
15:00

Russia	0–3	Germany
	Report	Sammer 56'; Klinsmann 77', 90'

Old Trafford, Manchester
Attendance: 50,760
Referee: Kim Milton Nielsen (Denmark)

Russia	Germany

GK	1	Dmitri Kharine
RB	2	Omari Tetradze
CB	7	Viktor Onopko (c)	(yellow card) 30'
CB	3	Yuri Nikiforov
LB	5	Yuri Kovtun	(red card) 70'
CM	19	Vladislav Radimov		(substituted off) 46'
CM	21	Dmitri Khokhlov		(substituted off) 66'
CM	4	Ilya Tsymbalar
RF	8	Andrei Kanchelskis	(yellow card) 13'
CF	9	Igor Kolyvanov
LF	10	Aleksandr Mostovoi
Substitutions:
MF	6	Valeri Karpin		(substituted on) 46'
FW	16	Igor Simutenkov		(substituted on) 66'
Manager:
Oleg Romantsev

GK	1	Andreas Köpke
SW	6	Matthias Sammer
CB	14	Markus Babbel	(yellow card) 16'
CB	5	Thomas Helmer
DM	21	Dieter Eilts
RM	2	Stefan Reuter
CM	7	Andreas Möller		(substituted off) 87'
CM	10	Thomas Häßler		(substituted off) 67'
LM	17	Christian Ziege
CF	18	Jürgen Klinsmann (c)
CF	20	Oliver Bierhoff	(yellow card) 31'	(substituted off) 85'
Substitutions:
MF	4	Steffen Freund		(substituted on) 67'
FW	11	Stefan Kuntz		(substituted on) 85'
MF	19	Thomas Strunz		(substituted on) 87'
Manager:
Berti Vogts

Man of the Match:
Jürgen Klinsmann (Germany)

Assistant referees:
Carl-Johan Christensen Meyer (Denmark)
Torben Siersen (Denmark)
Fourth official:
Lars Gerner (Denmark)

=== Russia vs Czech Republic ===
19 June 1996
19:30

Russia	3–3	Czech Republic
Mostovoi 49'; Tetradze 54'; Beschastnykh 85'	Report	Suchopárek 5'; Kuka 19'; Šmicer 88'

Anfield, Liverpool
Attendance: 21,128
Referee: Anders Frisk (Sweden)

Russia	Czech Republic

GK	12	Stanislav Cherchesov
RB	2	Omari Tetradze
CB	20	Sergei Gorlukovich
CB	3	Yuri Nikiforov	(yellow card) 5'
LB	16	Igor Simutenkov		(substituted off) 46'
RM	19	Vladislav Radimov	(yellow card) 26'
CM	21	Dmitri Khokhlov
CM	18	Igor Yanovsky	(yellow card) 61'
LM	4	Ilya Tsymbalar	(yellow card) 28'	(substituted off) 67'
SS	6	Valeri Karpin (c)
CF	9	Igor Kolyvanov		(substituted off) 46'
Substitutions:
MF	10	Aleksandr Mostovoi		(substituted on) 46'
FW	17	Vladimir Beschastnykh		(substituted on) 46'
MF	15	Igor Shalimov		(substituted on) 67'
Manager:
Oleg Romantsev

GK	1	Petr Kouba
SW	3	Jan Suchopárek
RB	2	Radoslav Látal
CB	15	Michal Horňák
LB	13	Radek Bejbl
RM	8	Karel Poborský
CM	7	Jiří Němec	(yellow card) 77'
CM	12	Luboš Kubík (c)
LM	4	Pavel Nedvěd	(yellow card) 60'
AM	14	Patrik Berger		(substituted off) 90'
CF	9	Pavel Kuka		(substituted off) 69'
Substitutions:
FW	17	Vladimír Šmicer		(substituted on) 69'
MF	6	Václav Němeček		(substituted on) 90'
Manager:
Dušan Uhrin

Man of the Match:
Karel Poborský (Czech Republic)

Assistant referees:
Mikael Nilsson (Sweden)
Sten Samuelsson (Sweden)
Fourth official:
Morgan Norman (Sweden)

=== Italy vs Germany ===
19 June 1996
19:30

Italy	0–0	Germany
	Report

Old Trafford, Manchester
Attendance: 53,740
Referee: Guy Goethals (Belgium)

Italy	Germany

GK	1	Angelo Peruzzi
RB	8	Roberto Mussi
CB	5	Alessandro Costacurta
CB	3	Paolo Maldini (c)
LB	4	Amedeo Carboni		(substituted off) 76'
DM	10	Demetrio Albertini
RM	17	Diego Fuser		(substituted off) 81'
CM	16	Roberto Di Matteo		(substituted off) 67'
LM	7	Roberto Donadoni
SS	21	Gianfranco Zola
CF	18	Pierluigi Casiraghi	(yellow card) 18'
Substitutions:
FW	19	Enrico Chiesa		(substituted on) 67'
DF	9	Moreno Torricelli		(substituted on) 76'
MF	15	Angelo Di Livio		(substituted on) 81'
Manager:
Arrigo Sacchi

GK	1	Andreas Köpke
SW	6	Matthias Sammer
CB	4	Steffen Freund
CB	5	Thomas Helmer
RWN	19	Thomas Strunz	(red card) 59'
DM	21	Dieter Eilts
LWB	17	Christian Ziege
CM	7	Andreas Möller		(substituted off) 89'
CM	10	Thomas Häßler
CF	9	Fredi Bobic
CF	18	Jürgen Klinsmann (c)
Substitutions:
MF	3	Marco Bode		(substituted on) 89'
Manager:
Berti Vogts

Man of the Match:
Andreas Köpke (Germany)

Assistant referees:
Marc Van den Broeck (Belgium)
Stany Op de Beeck (Belgium)
Fourth official:
Michel Piraux (Belgium)

== See also ==
- Czech Republic at the UEFA European Championship
- Germany at the UEFA European Championship
- Italy at the UEFA European Championship
- Russia at the UEFA European Championship
