= Czech Republic at the UEFA European Championship =

International football delegation

As the Czech Republic along with Slovakia are considered to be the successor team of Czechoslovakia by FIFA and UEFA, they have participated in eleven UEFA European Championships; three as Czechoslovakia and eight as the Czech Republic. As Czechoslovakia, they became European champions in 1976. As the Czech Republic, they have qualified for every European Championship that they have played qualifiers for and were runners-up at Euro 1996.

== Overall record ==
UEFA European Championship record										Qualification record					
Year	Round	Position	Pld	W	D	L	GF	GA	Squad	Pld	W	D	L	GF	GA
as Czechoslovakia										as Czechoslovakia					
(France) 1960	Third place	3rd	2	1	0	1	2	3	Squad	6	4	1	1	16	5
(Spain) 1964	Did not qualify									2	0	1	1	2	3
(Italy) 1968	Did not qualify									6	3	1	2	8	4
(Belgium) 1972	Did not qualify									6	4	1	1	11	4
(Socialist Federal Republic of Yugoslavia) 1976	Champions	1st	2	1	1	0	5	3	Squad	8	5	2	1	19	7
(Italy) 1980	Third place	3rd	4	1	2	1	5	4	Squad	6	5	0	1	17	4
(France) 1984	Did not qualify									8	3	4	1	15	7
(West Germany) 1988	Did not qualify									6	2	3	1	7	5
(Sweden) 1992	Did not qualify									8	5	0	3	12	9
as Czech Republic										as Czech Republic					
(England) 1996	Runners-up	2nd	6	2	2	2	7	8	Squad	10	6	3	1	21	6
(Belgium) (Netherlands) 2000	Group stage	10th	3	1	0	2	3	3	Squad	10	10	0	0	26	5
(Portugal) 2004	Semi-finals	3rd	5	4	0	1	10	5	Squad	8	7	1	0	23	5
(Austria) (Switzerland) 2008	Group stage	11th	3	1	0	2	4	6	Squad	12	9	2	1	27	5
(Poland) (Ukraine) 2012	Quarter-finals	6th	4	2	0	2	4	6	Squad	10	6	1	3	15	8
(France) 2016	Group stage	21st	3	0	1	2	2	5	Squad	10	7	1	2	19	14
(Europe) 2020	Quarter-finals	6th	5	2	1	2	6	4	Squad	8	5	0	3	13	11
(Germany) 2024	Group stage	22nd	3	0	1	2	3	5	Squad	8	4	3	1	12	6
(United Kingdom) (Republic of Ireland) 2028	To be determined									To be determined					
(Italy) (Turkey) 2032	To be determined									To be determined					
Total	1 Title	11/17	40	15	8	17	51	52	–	132	85	24	23	263	108

== Euro 1996 ==
=== Group stage ===
Pos	Team	Pld	W	D	L	GF	GA	GD	Pts	Qualification
1	Germany	3	2	1	0	5	0	+5	7	Advance to knockout stage
2	Czech Republic	3	1	1	1	5	6	−1	4 (Note: Head-to-head result: Czech Republic 2–1 Italy.)	Advance to knockout stage
3	Italy	3	1	1	1	3	3	0	4	
4	Russia	3	0	1	2	4	8	−4	1	

Source: UEFA
Rules for classification: Group stage tiebreakers
Notes:
9 June 1996
17:00

Germany	2–0	Czech Republic
Ziege 26'; Möller 32'	Report

Old Trafford, Manchester
Attendance: 37,300
Referee: David Elleray (England)

14 June 1996
19:30

Czech Republic	2–1	Italy
Nedvěd 5'; Bejbl 35'	Report	Chiesa 18'

Anfield, Liverpool
Attendance: 37,320
Referee: Antonio López Nieto (Spain)

19 June 1996
19:30

Russia	3–3	Czech Republic
Mostovoi 49'; Tetradze 54'; Beschastnykh 85'	Report	Suchopárek 5'; Kuka 19'; Šmicer 88'

Anfield, Liverpool
Attendance: 21,128
Referee: Anders Frisk (Sweden)

=== Knockout stage ===
Quarter-finals

23 June 1996
18:30

Czech Republic	1–0	Portugal
Poborský 53'	Report

Villa Park, Birmingham
Attendance: 26,832
Referee: Hellmut Krug (Germany)

Semi-finals

26 June 1996
16:00

France	0–0 (a.e.t.)	Czech Republic
	Report
Penalties
Zidane (penalty scored); Djorkaeff (penalty scored); Lizarazu (penalty scored); Guérin (penalty scored); Blanc (penalty scored); Pedros (penalty missed)	5–6	(penalty scored) Kubík; (penalty scored) Nedvěd; (penalty scored) Berger; (penalty scored) Poborský; (penalty scored) Rada; (penalty scored) Kadlec

Old Trafford, Manchester
Attendance: 43,877
Referee: Leslie Mottram (Scotland)

Final

30 June 1996
19:00

Czech Republic	1–2 (a.e.t./g.g.)	Germany
Berger 59' (pen.)	Report	Bierhoff 73', 95'

Wembley Stadium, London
Attendance: 73,611
Referee: Pierluigi Pairetto (Italy)

== Euro 2000 ==
=== Group stage ===
Pos	Team	Pld	W	D	L	GF	GA	GD	Pts	Qualification
1	Netherlands (H)	3	3	0	0	7	2	+5	9	Advance to knockout stage
2	France	3	2	0	1	7	4	+3	6	Advance to knockout stage
3	Czech Republic	3	1	0	2	3	3	0	3	
4	Denmark	3	0	0	3	0	8	−8	0	

Source: UEFA
Rules for classification: Group stage tiebreakers
(H) Hosts
11 June 2000
20:45

Netherlands	1–0	Czech Republic
F. de Boer 89' (pen.)	Report

Amsterdam Arena, Amsterdam
Attendance: 50,800
Referee: Pierluigi Collina (Italy)

16 June 2000
18:00

Czech Republic	1–2	France
Poborský 35' (pen.)	Report	Henry 7'; Djorkaeff 60'

Jan Breydel Stadium, Bruges
Attendance: 27,243
Referee: Graham Poll (England)

21 June 2000
20:45

Denmark	0–2	Czech Republic
	Report	Šmicer 64', 67'

Stade Maurice Dufrasne, Liège
Attendance: 20,000
Referee: Gamal Al-Ghandour (Egypt)

== Euro 2004 ==
=== Group stage ===
Pos	Team	Pld	W	D	L	GF	GA	GD	Pts	Qualification
1	Czech Republic	3	3	0	0	7	4	+3	9	Advance to knockout stage
2	Netherlands	3	1	1	1	6	4	+2	4	Advance to knockout stage
3	Germany	3	0	2	1	2	3	−1	2	
4	Latvia	3	0	1	2	1	5	−4	1	

Source: UEFA
Rules for classification: Group stage tiebreakers
15 June 2004
17:00

Czech Republic	2–1	Latvia
Baroš 73'; Heinz 85'	Report	Verpakovskis 45+1'

Estádio Municipal de Aveiro, Aveiro
Attendance: 21,744
Referee: Gilles Veissière (France)

19 June 2004
19:45

Netherlands	2–3	Czech Republic
Bouma 4'; Van Nistelrooy 19'	Report	Koller 23'; Baroš 71'; Šmicer 88'

Estádio Municipal de Aveiro, Aveiro
Attendance: 29,935
Referee: Manuel Mejuto González (Spain)

23 June 2004
19:45

Germany	1–2	Czech Republic
Ballack 21'	Report	Heinz 30'; Baroš 77'

Estádio José Alvalade, Lisbon
Attendance: 46,849
Referee: Terje Hauge (Norway)

=== Knockout stage ===
Quarter-finals

27 June 2004
19:45

Czech Republic	3–0	Denmark
Koller 49'; Baroš 63', 65'	Report

Estádio do Dragão, Porto
Attendance: 41,092
Referee: Valentin Ivanov (Russia)

Semi-finals

1 July 2004
19:45

Greece	1–0 (a.e.t./s.g.)	Czech Republic
Dellas 105+1'	Report

Estádio do Dragão, Porto
Attendance: 42,449
Referee: Pierluigi Collina (Italy)

== Euro 2008 ==
=== Group stage ===
Pos	Team	Pld	W	D	L	GF	GA	GD	Pts	Qualification
1	Portugal	3	2	0	1	5	3	+2	6 (Note: Head-to-head result: Portugal 2–0 Turkey.)	Advance to knockout stage
2	Turkey	3	2	0	1	5	5	0	6	Advance to knockout stage
3	Czech Republic	3	1	0	2	4	6	−2	3 (Note: Head-to-head result: Switzerland 0–1 Czech Republic.)	
4	Switzerland (H)	3	1	0	2	3	3	0	3	

Source: UEFA
Rules for classification: Group stage tiebreakers
(H) Hosts
Notes:
7 June 2008
18:00

Switzerland	0–1	Czech Republic
	Report	Svěrkoš 71'

St. Jakob-Park, Basel
Attendance: 39,730
Referee: Roberto Rosetti (Italy)

11 June 2008
18:00

Czech Republic	1–3	Portugal
Sionko 17'	Report	Deco 8'; Ronaldo 63'; Quaresma 90+1'

Stade de Genève, Geneva
Attendance: 29,016
Referee: Kyros Vassaras (Greece)

15 June 2008
20:45

Turkey	3–2	Czech Republic
Turan 75'; Kahveci 87', 89'	Report	Koller 34'; Plašil 62'

Stade de Genève, Geneva
Attendance: 29,016
Referee: Peter Fröjdfeldt (Sweden)

== Euro 2012 ==
=== Group stage ===
Pos	Team	Pld	W	D	L	GF	GA	GD	Pts	Qualification
1	Czech Republic	3	2	0	1	4	5	−1	6	Advance to knockout stage
2	Greece	3	1	1	1	3	3	0	4 (Note: Head-to-head result: Greece 1–0 Russia.)	Advance to knockout stage
3	Russia	3	1	1	1	5	3	+2	4	
4	Poland (H)	3	0	2	1	2	3	−1	2	

Source: UEFA
Rules for classification: Group stage tiebreakers
(H) Hosts
Notes:
8 June 2012
20:45 CEST

Russia	4–1	Czech Republic
Dzagoev 15', 79'; Shirokov 24'; Pavlyuchenko 82'	Report	Pilař 52'

Stadion Miejski, Wrocław
Attendance: 40,803
Referee: Howard Webb (England)

12 June 2012
18:00 CEST

Greece	1–2	Czech Republic
Gekas 53'	Report	Jiráček 3'; Pilař 6'

Stadion Miejski, Wrocław
Attendance: 41,105
Referee: Stéphane Lannoy (France)

16 June 2012
20:45 CEST

Czech Republic	1–0	Poland
Jiráček 72'	Report

Stadion Miejski, Wrocław
Attendance: 41,480
Referee: Craig Thomson (Scotland)

=== Knockout stage ===
Quarter-finals

21 June 2012
20:45 CEST

Czech Republic	0–1	Portugal
	Report	Ronaldo 79'

National Stadium, Warsaw
Attendance: 55,590
Referee: Howard Webb (England)

== Euro 2016 ==
=== Group stage ===
Pos	Team	Pld	W	D	L	GF	GA	GD	Pts	Qualification
1	Croatia	3	2	1	0	5	3	+2	7	Advance to knockout stage
2	Spain	3	2	0	1	5	2	+3	6	Advance to knockout stage
3	Turkey	3	1	0	2	2	4	−2	3	
4	Czech Republic	3	0	1	2	2	5	−3	1	

Source: UEFA
Rules for classification: Group stage tiebreakers
13 June 2016
15:00

Spain	1–0	Czech Republic
Piqué 87'	Report

Stadium Municipal, Toulouse
Attendance: 29,400
Referee: Szymon Marciniak (Poland)

17 June 2016
18:00

Czech Republic	2–2	Croatia
Škoda 76'; Necid 89' (pen.)	Report	Perišić 37'; Rakitić 59'

Stade Geoffroy-Guichard, Saint-Étienne
Attendance: 38,376
Referee: Mark Clattenburg (England)

21 June 2016
21:00

Czech Republic	0–2	Turkey
	Report	Yılmaz 10'; Tufan 65'

Stade Bollaert-Delelis, Lens
Attendance: 32,836
Referee: Willie Collum (Scotland)

== Euro 2020 ==
=== Group stage ===
Pos	Team	Pld	W	D	L	GF	GA	GD	Pts	Qualification
1	England (H)	3	2	1	0	2	0	+2	7	Advance to knockout stage
2	Croatia	3	1	1	1	4	3	+1	4 (Note: Tied on head-to-head result (Croatia 1–1 Czech Republic) and overall goal difference (+1). Overall goals for was used as the tiebreaker.)	Advance to knockout stage
3	Czech Republic	3	1	1	1	3	2	+1	4	Advance to knockout stage
4	Scotland (H)	3	0	1	2	1	5	−4	1	

Source: UEFA
Rules for classification: Group stage tiebreakers
(H) Hosts
Notes:
14 June 2021
15:00 (14:00 UTC+1)

Scotland	0–2	Czech Republic
	Report	Schick 42', 52'

Hampden Park, Glasgow
Attendance: 9,847
Referee: Daniel Siebert (Germany)

18 June 2021
18:00 (17:00 UTC+1)

Croatia	1–1	Czech Republic
Perišić 47'	Report	Schick 37' (pen.)

Hampden Park, Glasgow
Attendance: 5,607
Referee: Carlos del Cerro Grande (Spain)

22 June 2021
21:00 (20:00 UTC+1)

Czech Republic	0–1	England
	Report	Sterling 12'

Wembley Stadium, London
Attendance: 19,104
Referee: Artur Soares Dias (Portugal)

Ranking of third-placed teams

Pos	Grp	Team	Pld	W	D	L	GF	GA	GD	Pts	Qualification
1	F	Portugal	3	1	1	1	7	6	+1	4	Advance to knockout stage
2	D	Czech Republic	3	1	1	1	3	2	+1	4	Advance to knockout stage
3	A	Switzerland	3	1	1	1	4	5	−1	4	Advance to knockout stage
4	C	Ukraine	3	1	0	2	4	5	−1	3	Advance to knockout stage
5	B	Finland	3	1	0	2	1	3	−2	3	
6	E	Slovakia	3	1	0	2	2	7	−5	3	

Source: UEFA
Rules for classification: 1) Points; 2) Goal difference; 3) Goals scored; 4) Wins; 5) Lower disciplinary points total; 6) European Qualifiers overall ranking.

=== Knockout stage ===
Round of 16

27 June 2021
18:00

Netherlands	0–2	Czech Republic
	Report	Holeš 68'; Schick 80'

Puskás Aréna, Budapest
Attendance: 52,834
Referee: Sergei Karasev (Russia)

Quarter-finals

3 July 2021
18:00 (20:00 UTC+4)

Czech Republic	1–2	Denmark
Schick 49'	Report	Delaney 5'; Dolberg 42'

Olympic Stadium, Baku
Attendance: 16,306
Referee: Björn Kuipers (Netherlands)

== Euro 2024 ==
=== Group stage ===
Pos	Team	Pld	W	D	L	GF	GA	GD	Pts	Qualification
1	Portugal	3	2	0	1	5	3	+2	6 (Note: Head-to-head result: Turkey 0–3 Portugal.)	Advance to knockout stage
2	Turkey	3	2	0	1	5	5	0	6	Advance to knockout stage
3	Georgia	3	1	1	1	4	4	0	4	Advance to knockout stage
4	Czech Republic	3	0	1	2	3	5	−2	1	

Source: UEFA
Notes:
18 June 2024
21:00

Portugal	2–1	Czech Republic
Hranáč 69' (o.g.); Conceição 90+2'	Report	Provod 62'

Red Bull Arena, Leipzig
Attendance: 38,421
Referee: Marco Guida (Italy)

22 June 2024
15:00

Georgia	1–1	Czech Republic
Mikautadze 45+4' (pen.)	Report	Schick 59'

Volksparkstadion, Hamburg
Attendance: 46,524
Referee: Daniel Siebert (Germany)

26 June 2024
21:00

Czech Republic	1–2	Turkey
Souček 66'	Report	Çalhanoğlu 51'; Tosun 90+4'

Volksparkstadion, Hamburg
Attendance: 47,683
Referee: István Kovács (Romania)

== Goalscorers ==
Player	Goals	1960	1976	1980	1996	2000	2004	2008	2012	2016	2020	2024
Patrik Schick	6										5	1
Milan Baroš	5						5					
Vladimír Šmicer	4				1	2	1					
Jan Koller	3						2	1				
Zdeněk Nehoda	3		1	2								
Marek Heinz	2						2					
Petr Jiráček	2								2			
Václav Pilař	2								2			
Karel Poborský	2				1	1						
Radek Bejbl	1				1							
Patrik Berger	1				1							
Vlastimil Bubník	1	1										
Karol Dobiáš	1		1									
Tomáš Holeš	1										1	
Ladislav Jurkemik	1			1								
Pavel Kuka	1				1							
Tomáš Necid	1									1		
Pavel Nedvěd	1				1							
Anton Ondruš	1		1									
Antonín Panenka	1			1								
Ladislav Pavlovič	1	1										
Jaroslav Plašil	1							1				
Lukáš Provod	1											1
Libor Sionko	1							1				
Milan Škoda	1									1		
Tomáš Souček	1											1
Jan Suchopárek	1				1							
Ján Švehlík	1		1									
Václav Svěrkoš	1							1				
František Veselý	1		1									
Ladislav Vízek	1			1								
Total	51	2	5	5	7	3	10	4	4	2	6	3

== See also ==
- Czech Republic at the FIFA World Cup
