= Kouba =

Kouba may refer to:

== Geography ==
- Kouba, Algeria
- Kouka, Banwa in Burkina Faso
- Chamb, a river in Germany and the Czech Republic, known as "Kouba" in Czech
- Cham, Germany, a town in Germany, known as "Kouba" in Czech

== People ==
- Kouba (surname), a family name
