= Kouba (surname) =

Kouba (Czech feminine: Koubová) is a surname. Notable people with the surname include:

- Josef Kouba (1880–1951), Czechoslovak composer
- Les Kouba (1917–1998), American painter
- Otakar Kouba (1906–1983), Czechoslovak canoeist
- Paige Kouba (born 1994), American athlete
- Pavel Kouba (1938–1993), Czech footballer
- Petr Kouba (born 1969), Czech footballer
- Rhett Kouba (born 1999), American baseball player
