= UEFA Euro 1996 knockout stage =

Sporting event

The knockout stage of UEFA Euro 1996 was a single-elimination tournament involving the eight teams that qualified from the group stage of the tournament. There were three rounds of matches, with each round eliminating half of the teams, culminating in two teams playing in the final to determine the winners of the tournament. The knockout stage began with the quarter-finals on 22 June and ended with the final on 30 June 1996 at Wembley Stadium in London. Germany won the tournament with a 2–1 victory over the Czech Republic achieved by a golden goal during extra time.

All times British Summer Time (UTC+1)

== Format ==
Any game in the knockout stage that was undecided by the end of the regular 90 minutes, was followed by up to 30 minutes of extra time (two 15-minute halves). For the first time in a major football competition, the golden goal rule was applied, whereby the match would immediately end upon either team scoring during the extra time period and the goalscoring team being declared the winner. If scores were still level after 30 minutes of extra time, there would be a penalty shoot-out to determine who progressed to the next round. As with every tournament since UEFA Euro 1984, there was no third place play-off.

== Qualified teams ==
The top two placed teams from each of the four groups qualified for the knockout stage.

Group	Winners	Runners-up
A	England	Netherlands
B	France	Spain
C	Germany	Czech Republic
D	Portugal	Croatia

== Bracket ==
Quarter-finals
22 June – Liverpool
France (p)	0 (5)
Netherlands	0 (4)
23 June – Birmingham
Czech Republic	1
Portugal	0
23 June – Manchester
Germany	2
Croatia	1
22 June – London
Spain	0 (2)
England (p)	0 (4)

Semi-finals
26 June – Manchester
France	0 (5)
Czech Republic (p)	0 (6)
26 June – London
Germany (p)	1 (6)
England	1 (5)

Final
30 June – London
Czech Republic	1
Germany (g.g.)	2

== Quarter-finals ==
=== Spain vs England ===
22 June 1996
15:00

Spain	0–0 (a.e.t.)	England
	Report
Penalties
Hierro (penalty missed); Amor (penalty scored); Belsué (penalty scored); Nadal (penalty missed)	2–4	(penalty scored) Shearer; (penalty scored) Platt; (penalty scored) Pearce; (penalty scored) Gascoigne

Wembley Stadium, London
Attendance: 75,440
Referee: Marc Batta (France)

Spain	England

GK	1	Andoni Zubizarreta (c)
SW	6	Fernando Hierro
CB	4	Rafael Alkorta		(substituted off) 72'
CB	20	Miguel Ángel Nadal
CB	5	Abelardo	(yellow card) 1'
RM	3	Alberto Belsué	(yellow card) 40'
CM	18	Guillermo Amor
LM	12	Sergi
AM	17	Javier Manjarín		(substituted off) 46'
CF	19	Julio Salinas		(substituted off) 46'
CF	14	Kiko
Substitutions:
FW	11	Alfonso	(yellow card) 50'	(substituted on) 46'
MF	15	José Luis Caminero		(substituted on) 46'
DF	2	Juanma López		(substituted on) 72'
Manager:
Javier Clemente

GK	1	David Seaman
RB	2	Gary Neville	(yellow card) 47'
CB	5	Tony Adams (c)
CB	6	Gareth Southgate
LB	3	Stuart Pearce
RM	17	Steve McManaman		(substituted off) 109'
CM	7	David Platt
CM	8	Paul Gascoigne
LM	11	Darren Anderton		(substituted off) 109'
SS	10	Teddy Sheringham		(substituted off) 109'
CF	9	Alan Shearer
Substitutions:
MF	14	Nick Barmby		(substituted on) 109'
MF	20	Steve Stone		(substituted on) 109'
FW	21	Robbie Fowler		(substituted on) 109'
Manager:
Terry Venables

Man of the Match:
David Seaman (England)

Assistant referees:
Pierre Ufrasi (France)
Jacques Mas (France)
Fourth official:
Alain Sars (France)

=== France vs Netherlands ===
22 June 1996
18:30

France	0–0 (a.e.t.)	Netherlands
	Report
Penalties
Zidane (penalty scored); Djorkaeff (penalty scored); Lizarazu (penalty scored); Guérin (penalty scored); Blanc (penalty scored)	5–4	(penalty scored) De Kock; (penalty scored) De Boer; (penalty scored) Kluivert; (penalty missed) Seedorf; (penalty scored) Blind

Anfield, Liverpool
Attendance: 37,465
Referee: Antonio López Nieto (Spain)

France	Netherlands

GK	1	Bernard Lama
RB	15	Lilian Thuram
CB	5	Laurent Blanc
CB	8	Marcel Desailly
LB	12	Bixente Lizarazu
DM	19	Christian Karembeu	(yellow card) 48'
DM	7	Didier Deschamps (c)	(yellow card) 7'
CM	6	Vincent Guérin
AM	10	Zinedine Zidane
AM	9	Youri Djorkaeff
CF	11	Patrice Loko		(substituted off) 61'
Substitutions:
FW	13	Christophe Dugarry		(substituted on) 61'	(substituted off) 80'
MF	18	Reynald Pedros			(substituted on) 80'
Manager:
Aimé Jacquet

GK	1	Edwin van der Sar
RB	2	Michael Reiziger
CB	18	Johan de Kock	(yellow card) 68'
CB	3	Danny Blind (c)
LB	15	Winston Bogarde	(yellow card) 90'
DM	20	Philip Cocu
RM	6	Ronald de Boer
LM	14	Richard Witschge		(substituted off) 80'
AM	17	Jordi Cruyff		(substituted off) 69'
CF	10	Dennis Bergkamp		(substituted off) 60'
CF	9	Patrick Kluivert	(yellow card) 89'
Substitutions:
MF	4	Clarence Seedorf		(substituted on) 60'
MF	12	Aron Winter		(substituted on) 69'
FW	19	Youri Mulder		(substituted on) 80'
Manager:
Guus Hiddink

Man of the Match:
Bernard Lama (France)

Assistant referees:
Victoriano Giráldez Carrasco (Spain)
Manuel López Fernández (Spain)
Fourth official:
Juan Ansuátegui Roca (Spain)

=== Germany vs Croatia ===
23 June 1996
15:00

Germany	2–1	Croatia
Klinsmann 20' (pen.); Sammer 59'	Report	Šuker 51'

Old Trafford, Manchester
Attendance: 43,412
Referee: Leif Sundell (Sweden)

Germany	Croatia

GK	1	Andreas Köpke
SW	6	Matthias Sammer	(yellow card) 5'
CB	14	Markus Babbel
CB	5	Thomas Helmer
DM	21	Dieter Eilts
RM	2	Stefan Reuter
CM	8	Mehmet Scholl		(substituted off) 88'
CM	7	Andreas Möller
LM	17	Christian Ziege
SS	9	Fredi Bobic		(substituted off) 46'
CF	18	Jürgen Klinsmann (c)	(yellow card) 7'	(substituted off) 39'
Substitutions:
MF	4	Steffen Freund		(substituted on) 39'
FW	11	Stefan Kuntz		(substituted on) 46'
MF	10	Thomas Häßler		(substituted on) 88'
Manager:
Berti Vogts

GK	1	Dražen Ladić
RB	2	Nikola Jurčević		(substituted off) 78'
CB	4	Igor Štimac	(red card) 56'
CB	6	Slaven Bilić
LB	3	Robert Jarni
DM	5	Nikola Jerkan
RM	13	Mario Stanić
CM	7	Aljoša Asanović
LM	10	Zvonimir Boban (c)
CF	19	Goran Vlaović
CF	9	Davor Šuker
Substitutions:
MF	16	Mladen Mladenović		(substituted on) 78'
Manager:
Miroslav Blažević

Man of the Match:
Matthias Sammer (Germany)

Assistant referees:
Kenneth Petersson (Sweden)
Mikael Hansson (Sweden)
Fourth official:
Karl-Erik Nilsson (Sweden)

=== Czech Republic vs Portugal ===
23 June 1996
18:30

Czech Republic	1–0	Portugal
Poborský 53'	Report

Villa Park, Birmingham
Attendance: 26,832
Referee: Hellmut Krug (Germany)

Czech Republic	Portugal

GK	1	Petr Kouba
SW	15	Michal Horňák
RB	2	Radoslav Látal	(red card) 82'
CB	3	Jan Suchopárek	(yellow card) 1'
CB	5	Miroslav Kadlec
LB	13	Radek Bejbl	(yellow card) 55'
DM	7	Jiří Němec
RM	8	Karel Poborský
CM	6	Václav Němeček (c)		(substituted off) 90'
LM	17	Vladimír Šmicer	(yellow card) 23'	(substituted off) 85'
CF	9	Pavel Kuka	(yellow card) 69'
Substitutions:
MF	12	Luboš Kubík		(substituted on) 85'
MF	14	Patrik Berger		(substituted on) 90'
Manager:
Dušan Uhrin

GK	1	Vítor Baía (c)
RB	2	Secretário	(yellow card) 59'
CB	16	Hélder Cristóvão	(yellow card) 10'
CB	5	Fernando Couto
LB	13	Dimas Teixeira
CM	4	Oceano Cruz		(substituted off) 65'
CM	19	Paulo Sousa
RW	20	Luís Figo		(substituted off) 82'
AM	10	Rui Costa
LW	8	João Pinto	(yellow card) 90'
CF	9	Sá Pinto	(yellow card) 40'	(substituted off) 46'
Substitutions:
FW	15	Domingos		(substituted on) 46'
MF	18	António Folha		(substituted on) 65'
FW	11	Jorge Cadete		(substituted on) 82'
Manager:
António Oliveira

Man of the Match:
Karel Poborský (Czech Republic)

Assistant referees:
Klaus Plettenberg (Germany)
Egbert Engler (Germany)
Fourth official:
Hermann Albrecht (Germany)

== Semi-finals ==
=== France vs Czech Republic ===
26 June 1996
16:00

France	0–0 (a.e.t.)	Czech Republic
	Report
Penalties
Zidane (penalty scored); Djorkaeff (penalty scored); Lizarazu (penalty scored); Guérin (penalty scored); Blanc (penalty scored); Pedros (penalty missed)	5–6	(penalty scored) Kubík; (penalty scored) Nedvěd; (penalty scored) Berger; (penalty scored) Poborský; (penalty scored) Rada; (penalty scored) Kadlec

Old Trafford, Manchester
Attendance: 43,877
Referee: Leslie Mottram (Scotland)

France	Czech Republic

GK	1	Bernard Lama
RB	15	Lilian Thuram	(yellow card) 43'	(substituted off) 83'
CB	5	Laurent Blanc (c)
CB	8	Marcel Desailly
LB	20	Alain Roche	(yellow card) 50'
RM	10	Zinedine Zidane
CM	14	Sabri Lamouchi		(substituted off) 62'
CM	6	Vincent Guérin
LM	12	Bixente Lizarazu	(yellow card) 64'
SS	9	Youri Djorkaeff
CF	11	Patrice Loko
Substitutions:
MF	18	Reynald Pedros		(substituted on) 62'
DF	2	Jocelyn Angloma		(substituted on) 83'
Manager:
Aimé Jacquet

GK	1	Petr Kouba
SW	5	Miroslav Kadlec
CB	15	Michal Horňák
CB	19	Karel Rada
DM	7	Jiří Němec		(substituted off) 84'
DM	20	Pavel Novotný
RM	8	Karel Poborský
CM	6	Václav Němeček (c)	(yellow card) 83'
LM	4	Pavel Nedvěd	(yellow card) 77'
AM	17	Vladimír Šmicer		(substituted off) 46'
CF	10	Radek Drulák		(substituted off) 70'
Substitutions:
MF	14	Patrik Berger		(substituted on) 46'
DF	18	Martin Kotůlek		(substituted on) 70'
MF	12	Luboš Kubík	(yellow card) 97'	(substituted on) 84'
Manager:
Dušan Uhrin

Man of the Match:
Miroslav Kadlec (Czech Republic)

Assistant referees:
Robert Orr (Scotland)
John Fleming (Scotland)
Fourth official:
Hugh Dallas (Scotland)

=== Germany vs England ===
26 June 1996
19:30

Germany	1–1 (a.e.t.)	England
Kuntz 16'	Report	Shearer 3'
Penalties
Häßler (penalty scored); Strunz (penalty scored); Reuter (penalty scored); Ziege (penalty scored); Kuntz (penalty scored); Möller (penalty scored)	6–5	(penalty scored) Shearer; (penalty scored) Platt; (penalty scored) Pearce; (penalty scored) Gascoigne; (penalty scored) Sheringham; (penalty missed) Southgate

Wembley Stadium, London
Attendance: 75,862
Referee: Sándor Puhl (Hungary)

Germany	England

GK	1	Andreas Köpke
SW	6	Matthias Sammer
CB	14	Markus Babbel
CB	5	Thomas Helmer		(substituted off) 110'
RM	2	Stefan Reuter	(yellow card) 46'
CM	4	Steffen Freund		(substituted off) 118'
CM	21	Dieter Eilts
LM	17	Christian Ziege
AM	8	Mehmet Scholl		(substituted off) 77'
AM	7	Andreas Möller (c)	(yellow card) 80'
CF	11	Stefan Kuntz
Substitutions:
MF	10	Thomas Häßler		(substituted on) 77'
MF	3	Marco Bode		(substituted on) 110'
MF	19	Thomas Strunz		(substituted on) 118'
Manager:
Berti Vogts

GK	1	David Seaman
RB	7	David Platt
CB	6	Gareth Southgate
CB	5	Tony Adams (c)
LB	3	Stuart Pearce
DM	4	Paul Ince
RM	11	Darren Anderton
LM	17	Steve McManaman
AM	8	Paul Gascoigne	(yellow card) 73'
SS	10	Teddy Sheringham
CF	9	Alan Shearer
Manager:
Terry Venables

Man of the Match:
Dieter Eilts (Germany)

Assistant referees:
László Hamar (Hungary)
Imre Bozóky (Hungary)
Fourth official:
Sándor Piller (Hungary)

== Final ==
30 June 1996
19:00

Czech Republic	1–2 (a.e.t./g.g.)	Germany
Berger 59' (pen.)	Report	Bierhoff 73', 95'

Wembley Stadium, London
Attendance: 73,611
Referee: Pierluigi Pairetto (Italy)

Czech Republic	Germany

GK	1	Petr Kouba
RB	15	Michal Horňák	(yellow card) 47'
CB	3	Jan Suchopárek
CB	5	Miroslav Kadlec (c)
LB	19	Karel Rada
RM	8	Karel Poborský		(substituted off) 88'
CM	7	Jiří Němec
CM	13	Radek Bejbl
LM	4	Pavel Nedvěd
AM	14	Patrik Berger
CF	9	Pavel Kuka
Substitutions:
MF	17	Vladimír Šmicer		(substituted on) 88'
Manager:
Dušan Uhrin

GK	1	Andreas Köpke
SW	6	Matthias Sammer	(yellow card) 69'
RB	14	Markus Babbel
CB	5	Thomas Helmer	(yellow card) 63'
LB	17	Christian Ziege	(yellow card) 91'
DM	19	Thomas Strunz
DM	21	Dieter Eilts		(substituted off) 46'
AM	8	Mehmet Scholl		(substituted off) 69'
AM	10	Thomas Häßler
CF	11	Stefan Kuntz
CF	18	Jürgen Klinsmann (c)
Substitutions:
MF	3	Marco Bode		(substituted on) 46'
FW	20	Oliver Bierhoff		(substituted on) 69'
Manager:
Berti Vogts

Man of the Match:
Karel Poborský (Czech Republic)

Assistant referees:
Donato Nicoletti (Italy)
Tullio Manfredini (Italy)
Fourth official:
Marcello Nicchi (Italy)
