= Pavel Kouba =

Czech footballer

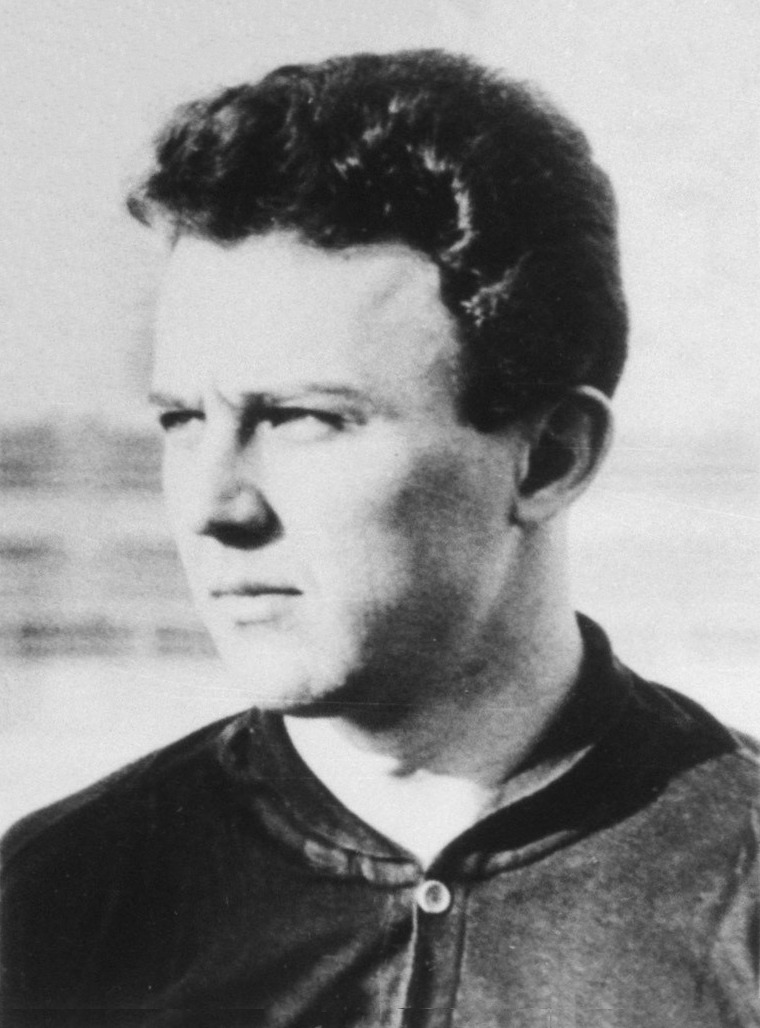
- Kouba in 1962

Personal information
- Date of birth: 1 September 1938
- Place of birth: Kladno, Czechoslovakia
- Date of death: 13 September 1993 (aged 55)
- Place of death: Czechoslovakia
- Position: Goalkeeper

Youth career
- 1945–1948: Lokomotiva Kladno

Senior career*
Years	Team	Apps	(Gls)
1958–1965	Dukla Prague		
1965–1969	Sparta Prague		
1969–1972	AS Angoulême	83	(0)

International career
1963	Czechoslovakia	3	(0)
Medal record
Men's football
Representing Czechoslovakia
FIFA World Cup
Runner-up	1962 Chile
- * Club domestic league appearances and goals

Pavel Kouba (1 September 1938 – 13 September 1993) was a Czech footballer who played as a goalkeeper.

During his club career he played for Dukla Prague, where he won the Czechoslovak First League four times. He earned three caps for the Czechoslovakia national team, and was part of the second-placed team at the 1962 FIFA World Cup. He played for AS Angoulême from 1969 to 1972.

His son Petr Kouba was also a successful footballer.
