= Stefan Kuntz =

German football manager (born 1962)

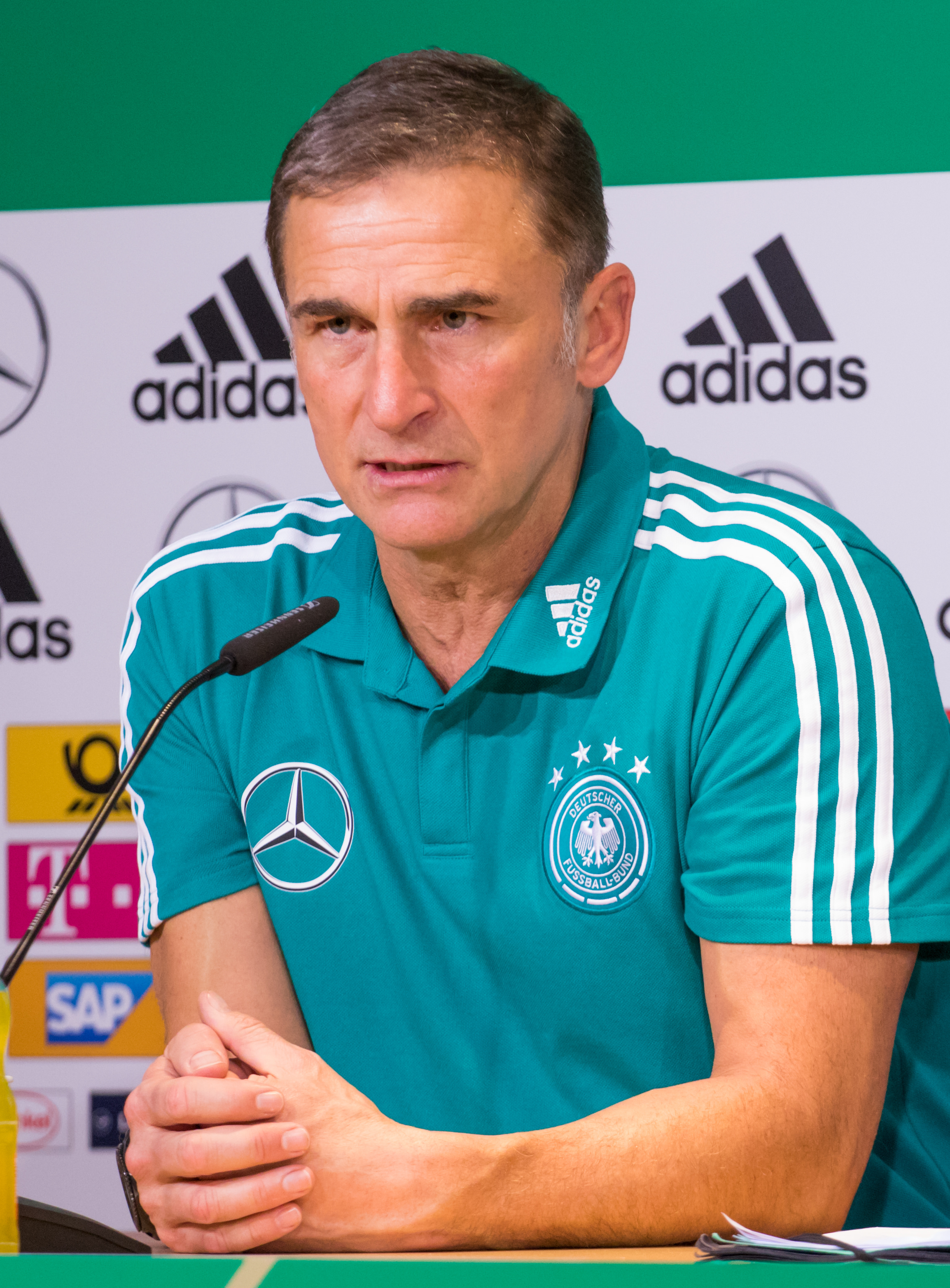
- Kuntz in 2018

Personal information
- Full name: Stefan Kuntz
- Date of birth: 30 October 1962 (age 64)
- Place of birth: Neunkirchen, West Germany
- Height: 1.80 m (5 ft 11 in)
- Position: Striker

Youth career
- 1970–1981: Borussia Neunkirchen

Senior career*
Years	Team	Apps	(Gls)
1980–1983	Borussia Neunkirchen	89	(28)
1983–1986	VfL Bochum	100	(41)
1986–1989	Bayer 05 Uerdingen	94	(32)
1989–1995	1. FC Kaiserslautern	170	(75)
1995–1996	Beşiktaş	30	(9)
1996–1998	Arminia Bielefeld	65	(25)
1998–1999	VfL Bochum	20	(6)
2000	Borussia Neunkirchen	1	(0)
2002–2003	SV Furpach	22	(22)
2004–2005	FC Palatia Limbach	10	(1)
Total		601	(239)

International career
1983–1985	West Germany U-21	4	(3)
1986	West Germany B	1	(2)
1993–1997	Germany	25	(6)

Managerial career
- 1999–2000: Borussia Neunkirchen
- 2000–2002: Karlsruher SC
- 2003: Waldhof Mannheim
- 2003: LR Ahlen
- 2016–2021: Germany U21
- 2021: Germany U23
- 2021–2023: Turkey
Medal record
Men's football
Representing Germany (as player)
UEFA European Championship
Winner	1996
Representing Germany (as manager)
UEFA European Under-21 Championship
Winner	2017
Winner	2021
- * Club domestic league appearances and goals

Stefan Kuntz (born 30 October 1962) is a German professional football manager and former player who played as a striker. He was most recently sporting director of Bundesliga side Hamburger SV.

Kuntz represented the Germany national team between 1993 and 1997, reaching the 1994 FIFA World Cup quarter-finals and winning UEFA Euro 1996. He scored six goals from 25 full caps, including in the Euro 1996 semi-final elimination of England.

== Club career ==
Kuntz's playing career lasted from 1983 until 1999. He made 449 appearances and scored 179 goals in the Bundesliga. Kuntz played for VfL Bochum, Bayer 05 Uerdingen, 1. FC Kaiserslautern and Arminia Bielefeld and also played in Turkey for Beşiktaş J.K. In 1986 and 1994, Kuntz was the top scorer in the Bundesliga.

In 1995, Kuntz joined Turkish side Beşiktaş following request of his compatriot coach Christoph Daum. Kuntz made his 1.Lig debut on 13 August 1995 in an away game against Kayserispor that ended 1–1. On 24 September 1995, he scored his first goal at week 5 home encounter against Istanbulspor which ended 5–2.

== International career ==
Germany manager Berti Vogts selected Kuntz for inclusion in the squad for the 1994 FIFA World Cup, but the only match he played in was the round of sixteen fixture against Belgium. Germany were subsequently knocked out at the quarter-finals by Bulgaria.

At UEFA Euro 1996, Kuntz made regular appearances for the team and replaced the injured Jürgen Klinsmann for the semi-final against England. He played a key role in the game, scoring the equalizer soon after England took the lead, as well as scoring the fifth German penalty in the shootout which took it into sudden death. During his international career, Kuntz obtained 25 caps, scoring six goals. None of these caps ended in a defeat for Germany (20 wins, one win after penalty shootout and four draws), which is the German record for most caps without defeat. In 1998, his shirt was prominently featured in the Three Lions 98 music video due to the way his name was pronounced in English.

=== International goals ===
No.	Date	Venue	Opponent	Score	Result	Competition
1.	18 December 1993	Oakland Coliseum, Oakland, United States	United States	2–0	3–0	Friendly
2.	7 September 1994	Luzhniki Stadium, Moscow, Russia	Russia	1–0	1–0	Friendly
3.	4 June 1996	Carl-Benz-Stadion, Mannheim, Germany	Liechtenstein	2–0	9–1	Friendly
4.	4 June 1996	Carl-Benz-Stadion, Mannheim, Germany	Liechtenstein	9–1	9–1	Friendly
5.	26 June 1996	Wembley Stadium, London, England	England	1–1	1–1	UEFA Euro 1996
6.	9 October 1996	Hrazdan Stadium, Yerevan, Armenia	Armenia	5–0	5–1	1998 FIFA World Cup qualification

== Post-playing career ==
From 2006 to 2008, Kuntz was the athletic director of VfL Bochum. Between 2008 and 2016, he was the board chairman of 1. FC Kaiserslautern.

As coach of Germany U21 he gained an impressive record by reaching the UEFA European Under-21 Championship final thrice: in 2017, 2019 and 2021; his side won two out of three finals, first beat Spain 1–0 in the final, and in 2021, Germany defeated Portugal by the same scoreline.

On 19 September 2021, he was appointed the new head coach of the Turkey national team. He was then fired from the position on 20 September 2023, after two poor games against Armenia and Japan and a rather underwhelming performance at the UEFA Euro 2024 qualifying, despite at the time, Turkey were in second place with three wins, one draw and one loss; it was largely believed that Kuntz's increasing unpopularity with many Turkish football fans led to his dismissal.

He later served as Sporting Director at Hamburger SV from May 2024 until late December 2025.

== Personal life ==
Stefan's father Günter, played for Borussia Neunkirchen throughout the 1960s and early 1970s with Günter himself attending Stefan's inaugural game with Neunkirchen.

== Sexual harassment allegations ==
In early January 2026, HSV publicly confirmed that an internal investigation had been opened after multiple employees reported alleged inappropriate conduct by Kuntz. The club’s supervisory board stated that the allegations were examined with external legal counsel and deemed credible, and that this assessment was a factor in the termination of his contract effective 31 December 2025.

Kuntz issued a statement on social media rejecting the claims and describing them as false, and his legal representatives indicated they would pursue action against what he referred to as defamatory reporting. Additionally, several media outlets reported that at least one employee described instances of inappropriate physical contact, while the HSV board maintained that the protection of those involved remained a priority in handling the matter.

== Managerial statistics ==
As of 12 September 2023

Team	From	To	Record				
Team	From	To	G	W	D	L	Win %
Borussia Neunkirchen	18 November 1999	30 June 2000	22	15	2	5	68.18
Karlsruher SC	1 July 2000	25 September 2002	79	30	20	29	37.97
Waldhof Mannheim	3 April 2003	30 June 2003	8	1	1	6	12.50
LR Ahlen	1 July 2003	13 November 2003	13	4	1	8	30.77
Germany U21	1 September 2016	19 September 2021	53	38	7	8	71.70
Germany Olympic	1 June 2021	7 August 2021	3	1	1	1	33.33
Turkey	19 September 2021	20 September 2023	20	12	3	5	60.00
Total			198	101	35	62	51.01

== Honours ==
=== Player ===
Kaiserslautern

- DFB-Pokal: 1989–90
- Bundesliga: 1990–91
- DFL-Supercup: 1991

Germany

- UEFA European Championship: 1996

Individual

- German Footballer of the Year: 1991

=== Manager ===
Germany U21

- UEFA European Under-21 Championship: 2017, 2021; runner-up: 2019
