= Michal Horňák =

Czech footballer and manager (born 1970)

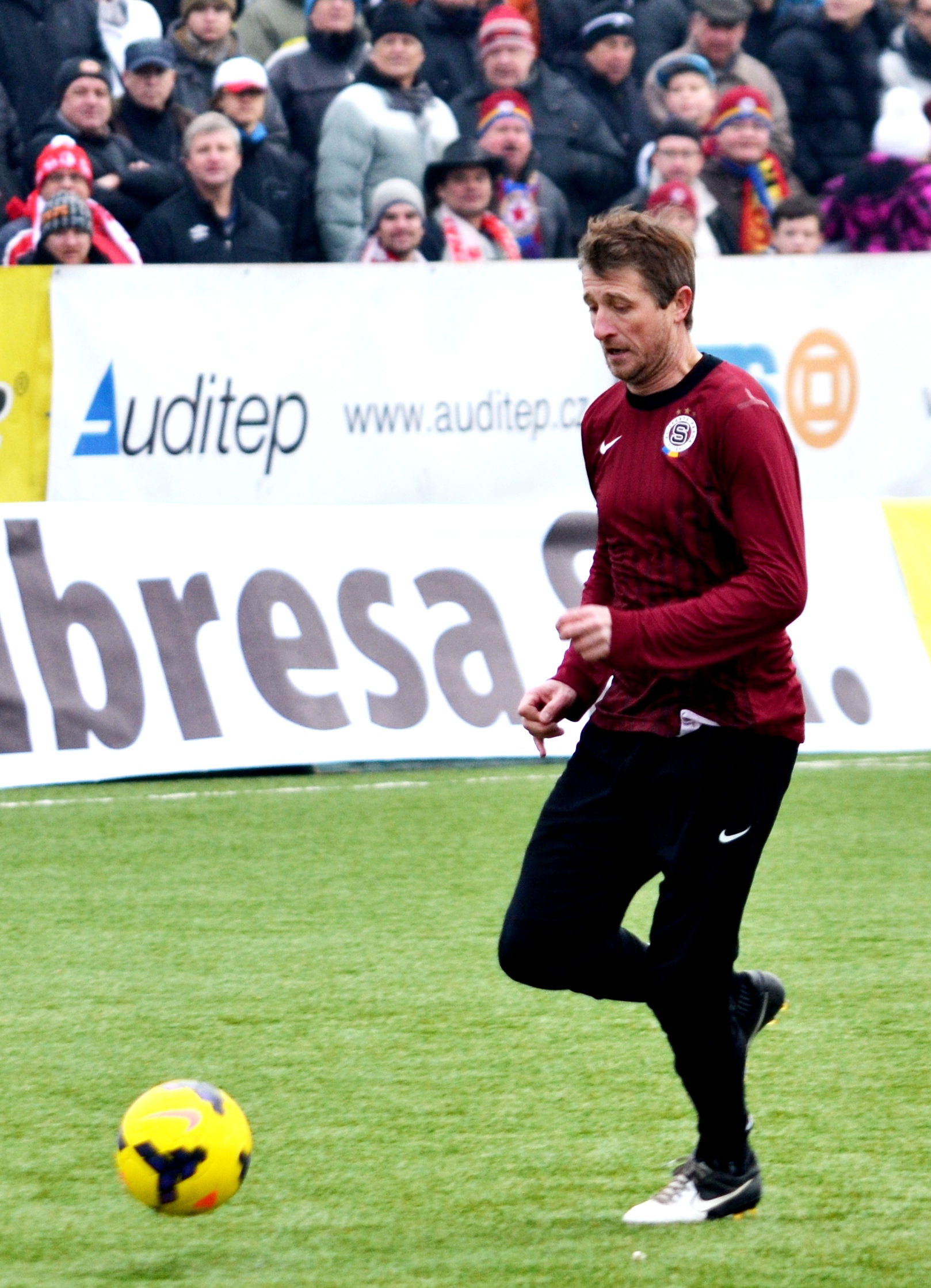

Personal information
- Date of birth: 28 April 1970 (age 56)
- Place of birth: Vsetín, Czechoslovakia
- Height: 1.82 m (6 ft 0 in)
- Position: Defender

Youth career
- 1977–1986: Zbrojovka Vsetín
- 1986–1987: TJ Gottwaldov

Senior career*
Years	Team	Apps	(Gls)
1988–1989	Sparta Prague	5	(0)
1989–1990	RH Cheb	30	(2)
1991–2001	Sparta Prague	234	(13)
2001–2003	LASK Linz	62	(2)
2003–2004	SFC Opava	16	(0)
2004–2005	SV Horn		
2005–2007	TJ Klatovy		

International career
1995–1999	Czech Republic	38	(1)

Managerial career
- 2008: FC Zenit Čáslav
- 2013: Vlašim
- 2014–2018: Sparta Prague B
- 2018–2019: Sparta Prague (assistant)
- 2019: Sparta Prague
- 2019–2020: Sparta Prague (assistant)
- 2020–2022: Sparta Prague B
- 2021–2025: Czech Republic U21 (assistant)
- 2022: Sparta Prague
- 2023: Viktoria Žižkov
- 2024–2025: Dukla Prague (assistant)
Medal record
Men's football
Representing Czech Republic
UEFA European Championship
Runner-up	1996 England
AC Sparta Prague
Winner	Gambrinus liga	1993–94
Winner	Gambrinus liga	1994–95
- * Club domestic league appearances and goals

Michal Horňák (born 28 April 1970) is a Czech football manager and former player.

== Biography ==
Horňák played as a defender for several clubs throughout his career, including TJ Gottwaldov, RH Cheb, Sparta Prague (most of his career) and LASK Linz (Austria). He won ten championship titles for Sparta Prague.

At international level, Horňák earned 38 appearances for the Czech Republic, scoring one goal. He was a participant at UEFA Euro 1996, where the Czech Republic won the silver medal.

After playing football, Horňák served as assistant coach for the Czech club FK Teplice in 2007. He was appointed coach of Vlašim in April 2013, but only stayed until the end of the calendar year before being replaced by Vlastimil Petržela.
