= Petr Kouba =

Czech footballer (born 1969)

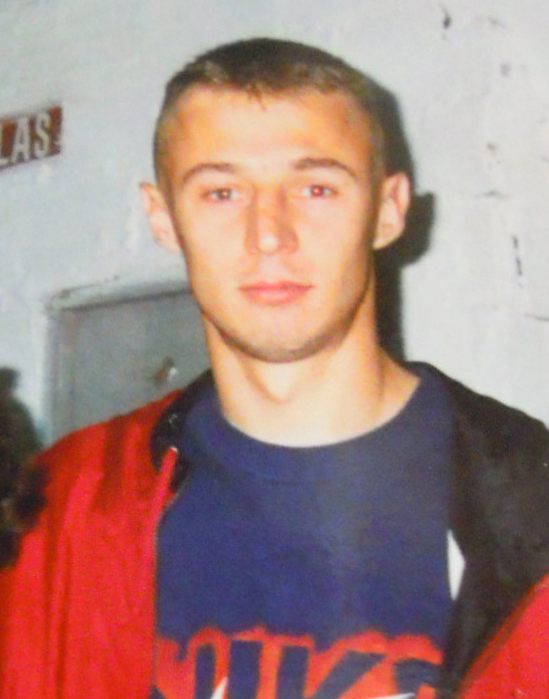
- Kouba in 1996

Personal information
- Date of birth: 28 January 1969 (age 57)
- Place of birth: Prague, Czechoslovakia
- Height: 1.85 m (6 ft 1 in)
- Position: Goalkeeper

Youth career
- 1982–1983: FC Bohemians Praha
- 1983–1985: Slavoj Vyšehrad
- 1985–1988: FC Bohemians Praha

Senior career*
Years	Team	Apps	(Gls)
1988–1990	FC Bohemians Praha	54	(0)
1991–1996	Sparta Prague	152	(1)
1996–1997	Deportivo La Coruña	4	(0)
1997–1998	1. FC Kaiserslautern	0	(0)
1998–1999	Viktoria Žižkov	23	(0)
1999–2001	Deportivo La Coruña	2	(0)
2001–2002	FK Jablonec	19	(0)
2002–2005	Sparta Prague	3	(0)
Total		257	(1)

International career
1991–1993	Czechoslovakia	14	(0)
1994–1998	Czech Republic	26	(0)
Medal record
Men's football
Representing Czech Republic
UEFA European Championship
Runner-up	1996 England
AC Sparta Prague
Winner	Gambrinus liga	1993–94
Winner	Gambrinus liga	1994–95
- * Club domestic league appearances and goals

Petr Kouba (born 28 January 1969) is a Czech former professional footballer who played as a goalkeeper as well as assistant coach for the Czech under-20 and under-21 national teams. He played for Czechoslovakia and later the Czech Republic, played a total of 40 matches between 1991 and 1998.

== Biography ==
The son of fellow goalkeeper Pavel Kouba, Kouba became interested in football after his father took him to a proper club when he was 12 years old. Kouba also played rugby until the age of 15. He began his playing career with Bohemians and Sparta Prague, scoring a goal from a penalty kick for the latter club in a national league match against SK České Budějovice in the 1994–95 season.

Kouba participated in UEFA Euro 1996, where the Czech Republic was runner-up. On 27 March 2004, he retired from football after Sparta Prague lost 0–2 against 1. FC Slovácko, resulting in the dismissal of coach Jiří Kotrba. Upon ending his playing career, Kouba became a goalkeeper coach for the Czech Republic national football team in 2022.
