= UEFA Euro 1996 =

10th European association football championship

UEFA Euro 96
1996 UEFA European Football Championship England 96
- Football Comes Home

Tournament details
- Host country: England
- Dates: 8–30 June
- Teams: 16
- Venues: 8 (in 8 host cities)

Final positions
- Champions: Germany (3rd title)
- Runners-up: Czech Republic
- Third place: England; France

Tournament statistics
- Matches played: 31
- Goals scored: 64 (2.06 per match)
- Attendance: 1,275,857 (41,157 per match)
- Top scorer: (England) Alan Shearer (5 goals)
- Best player: (Germany) Matthias Sammer

The 1996 UEFA European Football Championship, commonly referred to as Euro 96, was the 10th UEFA European Championship, a quadrennial football tournament contested by European nations and organised by UEFA. It took place in England from 8 to 30 June 1996. It was the first ever European Championship to feature 16 teams, an expansion from eight teams.

Matches were staged in eight cities and, although not all games were sold out, the tournament holds the European Championship's second-highest aggregate attendance (1,276,000) and average per game (41,158) for the 16-team format, surpassed only in 2012.

The tournament was the first European Championship where three points were awarded for a win during the qualification and finals group stages, as opposed to the old system of two points for a win, reflecting the growing use of this system in domestic leagues throughout the world during the previous decade.

Germany won the tournament, beating the Czech Republic 2–1 in the final with a golden goal from Oliver Bierhoff during extra time; this was the first major competition to be decided using this method. This was also Germany's first major title won as a unified nation, adding to the two European Championship titles won by West Germany prior to reunification.

== Bid process ==
At the time of the bidding process, it had not yet been confirmed that 16 teams would be participating. Instead, the bids were largely prepared as if hosting an eight-team tournament, meaning only four venues were due to be required. All candidates had to submit their plans by 10 December 1991.

The hosting of the event was contested by five bids: Austria, England, Greece, the Netherlands and Portugal. The English bid was selected by the UEFA Executive Committee at a meeting in Lisbon on 5 May 1992. In the year preceding the decision, the English FA had dropped plans to also bid for the 1998 World Cup in order to gain the support of other UEFA members who were planning to bid for that event.

== Summary ==
=== Group matches ===
The hosts, England, drew 1–1 with Switzerland in the opening match of Group A when Alan Shearer's 23rd-minute goal was cancelled out by a late Kubilay Türkyilmaz penalty kick. England defeated rivals Scotland 2–0 in their next game, and then produced one of their finest performances ever with a 4–1 win over the Netherlands. Patrick Kluivert's late goal for the Netherlands secured his team second place in the group and ensured that Scotland would exit another major competition on goals scored.

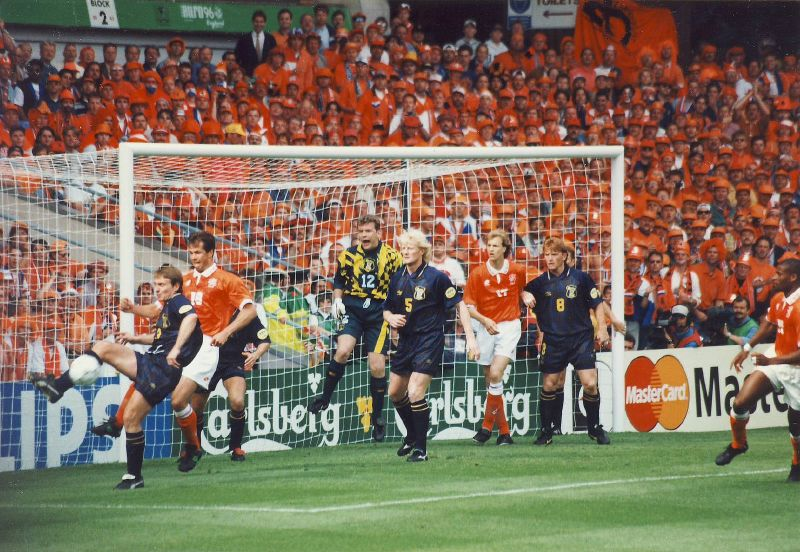
A Group A game between Scotland and the Netherlands at Villa Park

Group B had Western European France and Spain, along with Balkan World Cup participants Romania and Bulgaria. France and Spain dominated the group, with France avenging Bulgaria for the 1994 qualification debacle, and World Cup quarter-finalists Romania going home, with no points and only one goal scored.

Groups C and D saw the Czech Republic and Croatia, whose national teams had only recently come into existence, qualify for the knockout stage. The Czechs lost to Germany, the eventual group winners, in their opener, but then defeated Italy and drew with Russia. Italy's defeat meant they had to beat Germany in their final game to progress, but the World Cup finalists could only manage a 0–0 draw and were eliminated. In Group D, Croatia qualified for the quarter-finals, with wins over Turkey (1–0) and Denmark (3–0). The loss to the Croats ultimately sent the Danes, the surprise champions of 1992, home. Turkey became the first team since the introduction of a group stage to be eliminated without gaining a point or scoring a goal.

The other three quarter-finalists were Portugal (whose "Golden Generation" was competing at its first major tournament), Spain, and a France team featuring a young Zinedine Zidane.

=== Quarter-finals and semi-finals ===
The knockout stage was characterised by negative, defensive play; as a result, only nine goals were scored in the seven games and four of the matches were decided on penalties. The first quarter-final between the hosts and Spain ended goalless, after Spain had two goals disallowed and two claims for a penalty denied. The English progressed 4–2 on spot kicks. France and the Netherlands also played out a 0–0 draw, with France winning the penalty shootout 5–4. Jürgen Klinsmann opened the scoring for Germany in their match against Croatia. A goal from Davor Šuker evened the score after 51 minutes, before Matthias Sammer of Germany scored eight minutes later, and the game ended 2–1 to Germany. The Czech Republic progressed after beating Portugal 1–0.

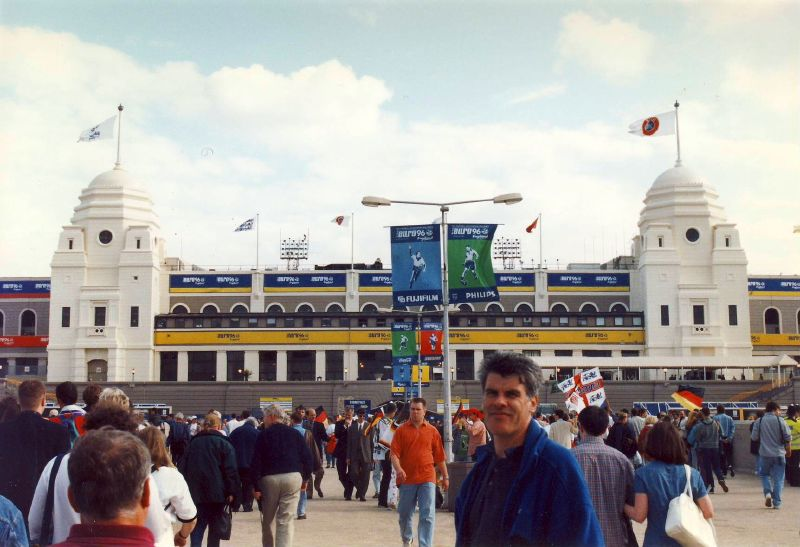
The view of Wembley Stadium from Wembley Way before the semi-final between Germany and England

The first semi-final, featuring France and the Czech Republic, resulted in another 0–0 draw and penalties. Reynald Pedros was the one player to miss in the shootout, as the Czechs won the penalty shoot-out 6–5. The other semi-final was a repeat of the 1990 World Cup semi-final between Germany and England. Alan Shearer headed in after three minutes to give his side the lead, but Stefan Kuntz evened the score less than 15 minutes later, and the score remained 1–1 after 90 minutes. In extra time, Paul Gascoigne came very close to scoring a golden goal, but fractionally missed a cross from Shearer in front of the empty goal, Darren Anderton hit the post, and Kuntz had a goal disallowed for pushing. Neither team was able to find a second goal. In penalties, both sides scored their first five kicks, but in the sixth round, Gareth Southgate had his penalty saved, allowing Andreas Möller to score the winning goal.

=== Final match ===
The final saw the Czech Republic hoping to repeat Euro 1976 when Czechoslovakia defeated West Germany; the Germans were aiming to win their third European Championship. Patrik Berger scored from a penalty in 59th minute to put the Czechs ahead. German substitute Oliver Bierhoff scored in the 73rd minute to make it 1–1. Five minutes into extra time, Bierhoff's shot was mishandled by Czech goalkeeper Kouba and the ball ended up in the back of the net for the first golden goal in the history of the competition. Germany were European champions again, but for the first time as a unified country.

== Qualification ==
On 30 November 1992, UEFA formally decided to expand the tournament to sixteen teams. UEFA cited the increased number of international teams following the dissolution of the Soviet Union and of Yugoslavia – rising from 33 UEFA members in 1988 to 48 by 1994 – as a driving factor behind the expansion. 47 teams eventually entered to compete for the fifteen remaining places in the finals, alongside hosts England.

The draw for the qualifying competition took place in Manchester on 22 January 1994. The teams were divided into eight groups, each containing either six or five teams. The qualifying process began in April 1994 and concluded in December 1995. At the end of the qualifying group stage in November 1995, the eight group winners qualified automatically, along with the six highest-ranked second-placed teams. The remaining two second-placed teams, the Netherlands and the Republic of Ireland, contested a one-off play-off match in England to decide the final qualifier.

=== Qualified teams ===
With the extended format, three teams qualified for their first European Championship: Bulgaria, Switzerland, and Turkey. Croatia, the Czech Republic, and Russia competed independently for the first time since the dissolution of Yugoslavia, Czechoslovakia, and the Soviet Union respectively (although the Russian team is considered by FIFA to be the direct descendant of the Soviet Union and CIS teams that had appeared in six past tournaments and the Czech team is one of two descendants of the Czechoslovakia team). Seven of the eight participants at the previous tournament in 1992 were again present, with only Sweden – despite also having finished third in the World Cup two years earlier – missing out. Italy and Spain qualified after missing out Euro 1992 and Romania and Portugal after 12 years.

The following sixteen teams qualified for the finals:

Team	Qualified as	Qualified on	Previous appearances in tournament (Note: Bold indicates champion for that year. Italic indicates host for that year.)
England	Host	5 May 1992	4 (1968, 1980, 1988, 1992)
Spain	Group 2 winner	11 October 1995	4 (**1964**, 1980, 1984, 1988)
Russia (Note: From 1960 to 1988, Russia competed as the Soviet Union, and in 1992 as CIS.)	Group 8 winner	11 October 1995	6 (**1960**, 1964, 1968, 1972, 1988, 1992)
Switzerland	Group 3 winner	15 November 1995	0 (debut)
Croatia	Group 4 winner	15 November 1995	0 (debut)
Scotland	4th best runner-up	15 November 1995	1 (1992)
Bulgaria	2nd best runner-up	15 November 1995	0 (debut)
Germany (Note: From 1972 to 1988, Germany competed as West Germany.)	Group 7 winner	15 November 1995	6 (**1972**, 1976, **1980**, 1984, 1988, 1992)
Romania	Group 1 winner	15 November 1995	1 (1984)
Turkey	3rd best runner-up	15 November 1995	0 (debut)
Denmark	5th best runner-up	15 November 1995	4 (1964, 1984, 1988, **1992**)
Czech Republic (Note: From 1960 to 1980, the Czech Republic competed as Czechoslovakia.)	Group 5 winner	15 November 1995	3 (1960, **1976**, 1980)
Italy	Best runner-up	15 November 1995	3 (**1968**, 1980, 1988)
France	6th best runner-up	15 November 1995	3 (1960, **1984**, 1992)
Portugal	Group 6 winner	15 November 1995	1 (1984)
Netherlands	Play-off winner	13 December 1995	4 (1976, 1980, **1988**, 1992)

=== Final draw ===
The draw for the final tournament took place on 17 December 1995 at the International Convention Centre in Birmingham. Only four teams were seeded: England (as hosts), Denmark (as holders), Spain and Germany (as the two highest ranked teams). The remaining twelve teams were all unseeded and could be drawn in any group.

Pot 1: Seeded teams	Pot 2: Unseeded teams		
England (hosts) (Note: Hosts England were automatically assigned to group position A1.)	Bulgaria	Italy	Russia
Denmark (holders) (Note: Defending champions Denmark were automatically assigned to Pot 1, and could be drawn into group position B1, C1 or D1.)	Croatia	Netherlands	Scotland
Germany	Czech Republic	Portugal	Switzerland
Spain	France	Romania	Turkey

Automatically selected as a top-seeded team into pot 1, irrespective of their ranking position.

Draw procedure:

1. The unseeded teams were first drawn one by one without being revealed from Pot 2, and placed consecutively into four group bowls labelled I to IV. The teams drawn first, fifth and ninth were put into the Group I bowl; second, sixth and tenth were put into the Group II bowl; third, seventh and eleventh were put into the Group III bowl; and fourth, eighth and twelfth were put into the Group IV bowl.
2. The team drawn first from each group bowl was placed into position 4 in their group; the team drawn second in position 3; and the team drawn third in position 2.
3. Finally, the four top-seeded teams were drawn from the separate Pot 1 bowl, and placed consecutively into position 1 of each group bowl.
4. Although it was decreed in advance ahead of the draw, that England's group would be Group A (irrespective of their drawn group label), the remaining three groups then consecutively had the three remaining letters (B, C and D) drawn from yet another bowl to decide the letter name of their group, which also determined what venues they would play at.

The balls were drawn by UEFA figures Gerhard Aigner and Lennart Johansson.

The draw resulted in the following groups:

Group A Team England Switzerland Netherlands Scotland	Group B Team Spain Bulgaria Romania France	Group C Team Germany Czech Republic Italy Russia	Group D Team Denmark Portugal Turkey Croatia

== Venues ==
Since the implementation of the Taylor Report in 1990, following the 1989 Hillsborough stadium disaster, England now had enough all-seater stadia of sufficient capacity to hold an expanded tournament due to the necessary stadium refurbishment by its leading clubs. The stadium capacities listed in the table are for the time of the tournament.

UEFA Euro 1996 is located in England		London	Manchester
UEFA Euro 1996 is located in England		Wembley Stadium	Old Trafford
UEFA Euro 1996 is located in England		Capacity: 76,567	Capacity: 55,000
UEFA Euro 1996 is located in England		Liverpool	Birmingham
UEFA Euro 1996 is located in England		Anfield	Villa Park
UEFA Euro 1996 is located in England		Capacity: 42,730	Capacity: 40,310
Leeds	Sheffield	Nottingham	Newcastle
Elland Road	Hillsborough	City Ground	St James' Park
Capacity: 40,204	Capacity: 39,859	Capacity: 30,539	Capacity: 36,649

== Squads ==
Each national team had to submit a squad of 22 players, three of whom must be goalkeepers.

== Finals format ==
To accommodate the expansion from an 8-team finals tournament to 16 teams, the format was changed from that used in 1992 with the addition of two extra groups in the group stage, and an extra round in the knockout phases. The four groups (A to D) still contained four teams each, with the top two from each group still going through to the knockout phase. 8 teams then went into the new quarter-finals, ahead of the usual semi-finals and final, with 8 teams going out at the group stage. The format is exactly the one which was applied to the 1958, 1962, 1966 and 1970 World Cups, except for the absence of a third place play-off.

== Match ball ==
A custom version of the Adidas Questra, the Questra Europa, was the official match ball of the championships. The design of the ball included a reworking of the England badge, and was the first coloured ball in a major football tournament.

== Match officials ==
Match officials are listed in the two collapsed tables below.

Country	Referee	Assistants		Fourth official	Matches refereed
Austria	Gerd Grabher	Egon Bereuter	Manfred Zeiszer	Günter Benkö	Netherlands 1–4 England
Belarus	Vadim Zhuk	Yuri Dupanov	Aleh Chykun	Kazimir Znaydinsky	France 1–1 Spain
Belgium	Guy Goethals	Marc Van den Broeck	Stany Op de Beeck	Michel Piraux	Italy 0–0 Germany
Bulgaria	Atanas Uzunov	Ivan Borissov Lekov	Iordan Iordanov	Stefan Ormandjiev	Switzerland 0–0 Netherlands
Czech Republic	Václav Krondl	Milan Brabec	Otakar Draštík	Jiří Ulrich	Scotland 1–0 Switzerland
Denmark	Peter Mikkelsen	Jens Larsen	Henning Knudsen	Knud Erik Fisker	Bulgaria 1–0 Romania
Denmark	Kim Milton Nielsen	Carl-Johan Christensen Meyer	Torben Siersen	Lars Gerner	Russia 0–3 Germany
England	David Elleray	Anthony Bates	Peter Walton	Stephen Lodge	Germany 2–0 Czech Republic
England	Dermot Gallagher	Phil Joslin	Mark Warren	Paul Durkin	France 3–1 Bulgaria
France	Marc Batta	Pierre Ufrasi	Jacques Mas	Alain Sars	Croatia 3–0 Denmark; Spain 0–0 England (Quarter-final)
Germany	Bernd Heynemann	Hans Wolf	Harald Sather	Hartmut Strampe	Croatia 0–3 Portugal
Germany	Hellmut Krug	Klaus Plettenberg	Egbert Engler	Hermann Albrecht	Romania 0–1 France; Czech Republic 1–0 Portugal
Hungary	Sándor Puhl	László Hamar	Imre Bozóky	Sándor Piller	Portugal 1–0 Turkey; Germany 1–1 England (Semi-final)
Italy	Piero Ceccarini	Enrico Preziosi	Fabrizio Zanforlin	Alfredo Trentalange	Spain 1–1 Bulgaria
Italy	Pierluigi Pairetto	Donato Nicoletti	Tullio Manfredini	Marcello Nicchi	Scotland 0–2 England; Czech Republic 1–2 Germany (Final)
Netherlands	Mario van der Ende	Jan Dolstra	Berend Talens	René Temmink	Denmark 1–1 Portugal
Russia	Nikolai Levnikov	Serguei Foursa	Sergei Frantsuzov	Sergei Khusainov	Turkey 0–3 Denmark
Scotland	Leslie Mottram	Robert Orr	John Fleming	Hugh Dallas	Italy 2–1 Russia; France 0–0 Czech Republic (Semi-final)
Spain	Manuel Díaz Vega	Joaquín Olmos González	Fernando Tresaco Gracia	José María García-Aranda	England 1–1 Switzerland
Spain	Antonio López Nieto	Victoriano Giráldez Carrasco	Manuel López Fernández	Juan Ansuátegui Roca	Czech Republic 2–1 Italy; France 0–0 Netherlands (Quarter-final)
Sweden	Anders Frisk	Mikael Nilsson	Sten Samuelsson	Morgan Norman	Russia 3–3 Czech Republic
Sweden	Leif Sundell	Kenneth Petersson	Mikael Hansson	Karl-Erik Nilsson	Netherlands 0–0 Scotland; Germany 2–1 Croatia (Quarter-final)
Switzerland	Serge Muhmenthaler	Ernst Felder	Martin Freiburghaus	Urs Meier	Turkey 0–1 Croatia
Turkey	Ahmet Çakar	Akif Uğurdur	Turgay Güdü	Oğuz Sarvan	Romania 1–2 Spain

== Group stage ==
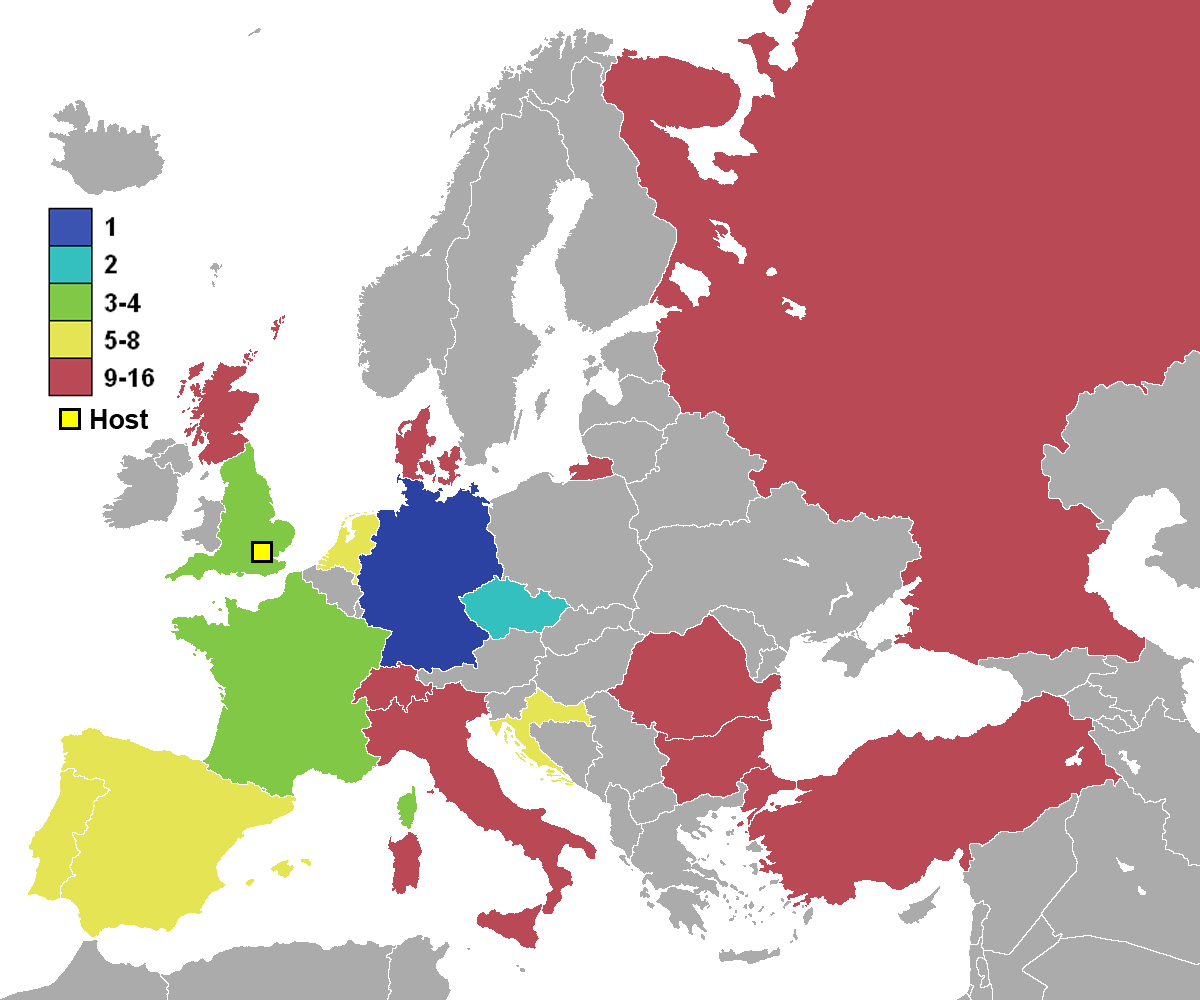
Finishing positions of the participating teams

The teams finishing in the top two positions in each of the four groups progress to the quarter-finals, while the bottom two teams in each group were eliminated from the tournament. For the first time at a European Championship three points were awarded for a win, with one for a draw and a none for a defeat.

All times are local, BST (UTC+1).

=== Tiebreakers ===
For the first time in the history of the European Championship, the position of teams tied on points was decided by their head-to-head record, and not goal difference. If two or more teams finished level on points after completion of the group matches, the following tie-breakers were used to determine the final ranking:

1. Higher number of points obtained in the matches played between the teams in question;
2. Superior goal difference resulting from the matches played between the teams in question (if more than two teams finish equal on points);
3. Higher number of goals scored in the matches played between the teams in question (if more than two teams finish equal on points);
4. If, after having applied criteria 1 to 3 to more than two teams, two teams still have an equal ranking, criteria 1 to 3 are reapplied exclusively to the matches between the two teams in question to determine the final rankings of the two teams. If this procedure does not lead to a decision, criteria 5 to 9 apply in the order given;
5. Superior goal difference in all group matches;
6. Higher number of goals scored in all group matches;
7. Position using UEFA's national team coefficient ranking system calculated using average points per game from: the Euro 1992 qualifying stage and final tournament, the 1994 World Cup qualifying stage and final tournament and the Euro 1996 qualifying stage.
8. Fair play conduct of the teams (final tournament);
9. Drawing of lots.

=== Group A ===
Pos	Team	Pld	W	D	L	GF	GA	GD	Pts	Qualification
1	England (H)	3	2	1	0	7	2	+5	7	Advance to knockout stage
2	Netherlands	3	1	1	1	3	4	−1	4 (Note: Tied on head-to-head result (Netherlands 0–0 Scotland) and overall goal difference (−1). Overall goals for was used as the tiebreaker.)	Advance to knockout stage
3	Scotland	3	1	1	1	1	2	−1	4	
4	Switzerland	3	0	1	2	1	4	−3	1	

Source: UEFA
(H) Hosts
Notes:
8 June 1996
15:00

England	1–1	Switzerland
Shearer 23'	Report	Türkyilmaz 83' (pen.)

Wembley Stadium, London
Attendance: 76,567
Referee: Manuel Díaz Vega (Spain)
10 June 1996
16:30

Netherlands	0–0	Scotland
	Report

Villa Park, Birmingham
Attendance: 34,363
Referee: Leif Sundell (Sweden)

13 June 1996
19:30

Switzerland	0–2	Netherlands
	Report	Cruyff 66'; Bergkamp 79'

Villa Park, Birmingham
Attendance: 36,800
Referee: Atanas Uzunov (Bulgaria)
15 June 1996
15:00

Scotland	0–2	England
	Report	Shearer 53'; Gascoigne 79'

Wembley Stadium, London
Attendance: 76,864
Referee: Pierluigi Pairetto (Italy)

18 June 1996
19:30

Scotland	1–0	Switzerland
McCoist 36'	Report

Villa Park, Birmingham
Attendance: 34,926
Referee: Václav Krondl (Czech Republic)
18 June 1996
19:30

Netherlands	1–4	England
Kluivert 78'	Report	Shearer 23' (pen.), 57'; Sheringham 51', 62'

Wembley Stadium, London
Attendance: 76,798
Referee: Gerd Grabher (Austria)

=== Group B ===
Pos	Team	Pld	W	D	L	GF	GA	GD	Pts	Qualification
1	France	3	2	1	0	5	2	+3	7	Advance to knockout stage
2	Spain	3	1	2	0	4	3	+1	5	Advance to knockout stage
3	Bulgaria	3	1	1	1	3	4	−1	4	
4	Romania	3	0	0	3	1	4	−3	0	

Source: UEFA
9 June 1996
14:30

Spain	1–1	Bulgaria
Alfonso 74'	Report	Stoichkov 65' (pen.)

Elland Road, Leeds
Attendance: 24,006
Referee: Piero Ceccarini (Italy)
10 June 1996
19:30

Romania	0–1	France
	Report	Dugarry 25'

St James' Park, Newcastle
Attendance: 26,323
Referee: Hellmut Krug (Germany)

13 June 1996
16:30

Bulgaria	1–0	Romania
Stoichkov 3'	Report

St James' Park, Newcastle
Attendance: 19,107
Referee: Peter Mikkelsen (Denmark)
15 June 1996
18:00

France	1–1	Spain
Djorkaeff 48'	Report	Caminero 85'

Elland Road, Leeds
Attendance: 35,626
Referee: Vadim Zhuk (Belarus)

18 June 1996
16:30

France	3–1	Bulgaria
Blanc 21'; Penev 63' (o.g.); Loko 90'	Report	Stoichkov 69'

St James' Park, Newcastle
Attendance: 26,976
Referee: Dermot Gallagher (England) (Note: Gallagher suffered an injury in the 28th minute and was replaced by fourth official Paul Durkin (England).)
18 June 1996
16:30

Romania	1–2	Spain
Răducioiu 29'	Report	Manjarín 11'; Amor 84'

Elland Road, Leeds
Attendance: 32,719
Referee: Ahmet Çakar (Turkey)

=== Group C ===
Pos	Team	Pld	W	D	L	GF	GA	GD	Pts	Qualification
1	Germany	3	2	1	0	5	0	+5	7	Advance to knockout stage
2	Czech Republic	3	1	1	1	5	6	−1	4 (Note: Head-to-head result: Czech Republic 2–1 Italy.)	Advance to knockout stage
3	Italy	3	1	1	1	3	3	0	4	
4	Russia	3	0	1	2	4	8	−4	1	

Source: UEFA
Notes:
9 June 1996
17:00

Germany	2–0	Czech Republic
Ziege 26'; Möller 32'	Report

Old Trafford, Manchester
Attendance: 37,300
Referee: David Elleray (England)
11 June 1996
16:30

Italy	2–1	Russia
Casiraghi 5', 52'	Report	Tsymbalar 21'

Anfield, Liverpool
Attendance: 35,120
Referee: Leslie Mottram (Scotland)

14 June 1996
19:30

Czech Republic	2–1	Italy
Nedvěd 5'; Bejbl 35'	Report	Chiesa 18'

Anfield, Liverpool
Attendance: 37,320
Referee: Antonio López Nieto (Spain)
16 June 1996
15:00

Russia	0–3	Germany
	Report	Sammer 56'; Klinsmann 77', 90'

Old Trafford, Manchester
Attendance: 50,760
Referee: Kim Milton Nielsen (Denmark)

19 June 1996
19:30

Russia	3–3	Czech Republic
Mostovoi 49'; Tetradze 54'; Beschastnykh 85'	Report	Suchopárek 5'; Kuka 19'; Šmicer 88'

Anfield, Liverpool
Attendance: 21,128
Referee: Anders Frisk (Sweden)
19 June 1996
19:30

Italy	0–0	Germany
	Report

Old Trafford, Manchester
Attendance: 53,740
Referee: Guy Goethals (Belgium)

=== Group D ===
Pos	Team	Pld	W	D	L	GF	GA	GD	Pts	Qualification
1	Portugal	3	2	1	0	5	1	+4	7	Advance to knockout stage
2	Croatia	3	2	0	1	4	3	+1	6	Advance to knockout stage
3	Denmark	3	1	1	1	4	4	0	4	
4	Turkey	3	0	0	3	0	5	−5	0	

Source: UEFA
9 June 1996
19:30

Denmark	1–1	Portugal
B. Laudrup 22'	Report	Sá Pinto 53'

Hillsborough, Sheffield
Attendance: 34,993
Referee: Mario van der Ende (Netherlands)
11 June 1996
19:30

Turkey	0–1	Croatia
	Report	Vlaović 86'

City Ground, Nottingham
Attendance: 22,460
Referee: Serge Muhmenthaler (Switzerland)

14 June 1996
16:30

Portugal	1–0	Turkey
Couto 66'	Report

City Ground, Nottingham
Attendance: 22,670
Referee: Sándor Puhl (Hungary)
16 June 1996
18:00

Croatia	3–0	Denmark
Šuker 54' (pen.), 90'; Boban 81'	Report

Hillsborough, Sheffield
Attendance: 33,671
Referee: Marc Batta (France)

19 June 1996
16:30

Croatia	0–3	Portugal
	Report	Figo 4'; João Pinto 33'; Domingos 82'

City Ground, Nottingham
Attendance: 20,484
Referee: Bernd Heynemann (Germany)
19 June 1996
16:30

Turkey	0–3	Denmark
	Report	B. Laudrup 50', 84'; A. Nielsen 69'

Hillsborough, Sheffield
Attendance: 28,951
Referee: Nikolai Levnikov (Russia)

== Knockout stage ==
The knockout stage was a single-elimination tournament with each round eliminating the losers. Any game that was undecided by the end of the regular 90 minutes, was followed by up to thirty minutes of extra time. For the first time in a major football competition, the golden goal system was applied, whereby the first team to score during the extra time would become the winner. If no goal was scored there would be a penalty shoot-out to determine the winner. For the first time the final was won by a golden goal.

As with every tournament since UEFA Euro 1984, there was no third place play-off.

All times are local, BST (UTC+1).

=== Bracket ===
Quarter-finals
22 June – Liverpool
France (p)	0 (5)
Netherlands	0 (4)
23 June – Birmingham
Czech Republic	1
Portugal	0
23 June – Manchester
Germany	2
Croatia	1
22 June – London
Spain	0 (2)
England (p)	0 (4)

Semi-finals
26 June – Manchester
France	0 (5)
Czech Republic (p)	0 (6)
26 June – London
Germany (p)	1 (6)
England	1 (5)

Final
30 June – London
Czech Republic	1
Germany (g.g.)	2

=== Quarter-finals ===
22 June 1996
15:00

Spain	0–0 (a.e.t.)	England
	Report
Penalties
Hierro (penalty missed); Amor (penalty scored); Belsué (penalty scored); Nadal (penalty missed)	2–4	(penalty scored) Shearer; (penalty scored) Platt; (penalty scored) Pearce; (penalty scored) Gascoigne

Wembley Stadium, London
Attendance: 75,440
Referee: Marc Batta (France)

22 June 1996
18:30

France	0–0 (a.e.t.)	Netherlands
	Report
Penalties
Zidane (penalty scored); Djorkaeff (penalty scored); Lizarazu (penalty scored); Guérin (penalty scored); Blanc (penalty scored)	5–4	(penalty scored) De Kock; (penalty scored) De Boer; (penalty scored) Kluivert; (penalty missed) Seedorf; (penalty scored) Blind

Anfield, Liverpool
Attendance: 37,465
Referee: Antonio López Nieto (Spain)

23 June 1996
15:00

Germany	2–1	Croatia
Klinsmann 20' (pen.); Sammer 59'	Report	Šuker 51'

Old Trafford, Manchester
Attendance: 43,412
Referee: Leif Sundell (Sweden)

23 June 1996
18:30

Czech Republic	1–0	Portugal
Poborský 53'	Report

Villa Park, Birmingham
Attendance: 26,832
Referee: Hellmut Krug (Germany)

=== Semi-finals ===
26 June 1996
16:00

France	0–0 (a.e.t.)	Czech Republic
	Report
Penalties
Zidane (penalty scored); Djorkaeff (penalty scored); Lizarazu (penalty scored); Guérin (penalty scored); Blanc (penalty scored); Pedros (penalty missed)	5–6	(penalty scored) Kubík; (penalty scored) Nedvěd; (penalty scored) Berger; (penalty scored) Poborský; (penalty scored) Rada; (penalty scored) Kadlec

Old Trafford, Manchester
Attendance: 43,877
Referee: Leslie Mottram (Scotland)

26 June 1996
19:30

Germany	1–1 (a.e.t.)	England
Kuntz 16'	Report	Shearer 3'
Penalties
Häßler (penalty scored); Strunz (penalty scored); Reuter (penalty scored); Ziege (penalty scored); Kuntz (penalty scored); Möller (penalty scored)	6–5	(penalty scored) Shearer; (penalty scored) Platt; (penalty scored) Pearce; (penalty scored) Gascoigne; (penalty scored) Sheringham; (penalty missed) Southgate

Wembley Stadium, London
Attendance: 75,862
Referee: Sándor Puhl (Hungary)

=== Final ===
30 June 1996
19:00

Czech Republic	1–2 (a.e.t./g.g.)	Germany
Berger 59' (pen.)	Report	Bierhoff 73', 95'

Wembley Stadium, London
Attendance: 73,611
Referee: Pierluigi Pairetto (Italy)

== Statistics ==
=== Goalscorers ===
There were 64 goals scored in 31 matches, for an average of 2.06 goals per match.

5 goals

- (England) Alan Shearer

3 goals

- (Bulgaria) Hristo Stoichkov
- (Croatia) Davor Šuker
- (Denmark) Brian Laudrup
- (Germany) Jürgen Klinsmann

2 goals

- (England) Teddy Sheringham
- (Germany) Oliver Bierhoff
- (Germany) Matthias Sammer
- (Italy) Pierluigi Casiraghi

1 goal

- (Croatia) Zvonimir Boban
- (Croatia) Goran Vlaović
- (Czech Republic) Radek Bejbl
- (Czech Republic) Patrik Berger
- (Czech Republic) Pavel Kuka
- (Czech Republic) Pavel Nedvěd
- (Czech Republic) Karel Poborský
- (Czech Republic) Vladimír Šmicer
- (Czech Republic) Jan Suchopárek
- (Denmark) Allan Nielsen
- (England) Paul Gascoigne
- (France) Laurent Blanc
- (France) Youri Djorkaeff
- (France) Christophe Dugarry
- (France) Patrice Loko
- (Germany) Stefan Kuntz
- (Germany) Andreas Möller
- (Germany) Christian Ziege
- (Italy) Enrico Chiesa
- (Netherlands) Dennis Bergkamp
- (Netherlands) Jordi Cruyff
- (Netherlands) Patrick Kluivert
- (Portugal) Fernando Couto
- (Portugal) Domingos
- (Portugal) Luís Figo
- (Portugal) João Pinto
- (Portugal) Sá Pinto
- (Romania) Florin Răducioiu
- (Russia) Vladimir Beschastnykh
- (Russia) Aleksandr Mostovoi
- (Russia) Omari Tetradze
- (Russia) Ilya Tsymbalar
- (Scotland) Ally McCoist
- (Spain) Alfonso
- (Spain) Guillermo Amor
- (Spain) José Luis Caminero
- (Spain) Javier Manjarín
- (Switzerland) Kubilay Türkyilmaz

1 own goal

- (Bulgaria) Lyuboslav Penev (against France)

=== Discipline ===
Player	Offence(s)	Suspension(s)
(Bulgaria) Petar Hubchev	(red card) in Group B vs Spain (matchday 1; 9 June)	Group B vs Romania (matchday 2; 13 June)
(Spain) Juan Antonio Pizzi	(red card) in Group B vs Bulgaria (matchday 1; 9 June)	Group B vs France (matchday 2; 15 June)
(Bulgaria) Radostin Kishishev	(yellow card) in Group B vs Spain (matchday 1; 9 June); (yellow card) in Group B vs Romania (matchday 2; 13 June)	Group B vs France (matchday 3; 18 June)
(Switzerland) Marco Grassi	(yellow card) in Group A vs England (matchday 1; 8 June); (yellow card) in Group A vs Netherlands (matchday 2; 13 June)	Group A vs Scotland (matchday 3; 18 June)
(Portugal) Paulinho Santos	(yellow card) in Group D vs Denmark (matchday 1; 9 June); (yellow card) in Group D vs Turkey (matchday 2; 14 June)	Group D vs Croatia (matchday 3; 19 June)
(Turkey) Tolunay Kafkas	(yellow card) in Group D vs Croatia (matchday 1; 11 June); (yellow card) in Group D vs Portugal (matchday 2; 14 June)	Group D vs Denmark (matchday 3; 19 June)
(Italy) Luigi Apolloni	(red card) in Group C vs Czech Republic (matchday 2; 14 June)	Group C vs Germany (matchday 3; 19 June)
(Czech Republic) Miroslav Kadlec	(yellow card) in Group C vs Germany (matchday 1; 9 June); (yellow card) in Group C vs Italy (matchday 2; 14 June)	Group C vs Russia (matchday 3; 19 June)
(Germany) Markus Babbel	(yellow card) in Group C vs Czech Republic (matchday 1; 9 June); (yellow card) in Group C vs Russia (matchday 2; 16 June)	Group C vs Italy (matchday 3; 19 June)
(Russia) Viktor Onopko	(yellow card) in Group C vs Italy (matchday 1; 11 June); (yellow card) in Group C vs Germany (matchday 2; 16 June)	Group C vs Czech Republic (matchday 3; 19 June)
(Russia) Yuri Kovtun	(red card) in Group C vs Germany (matchday 2; 16 June)	Group C vs Czech Republic (matchday 3; 19 June)
(England) Paul Ince	(yellow card) in Group A vs Scotland (matchday 2; 15 June); (yellow card) in Group A vs Netherlands (matchday 3; 18 June)	Quarter-finals vs Spain (22 June)
(Czech Republic) Pavel Nedvěd	(yellow card) in Group C vs Germany (matchday 1; 9 June); (yellow card) in Group C vs Russia (matchday 3; 19 June)	Quarter-finals vs Portugal (23 June)
(Germany) Thomas Strunz	(red card) in Group C vs Italy (matchday 3; 19 June)	Quarter-finals vs Croatia (23 June)
(England) Gary Neville	(yellow card) in Group A vs Switzerland (matchday 1; 8 June); (yellow card) in Quarter-finals vs Spain (22 June)	Semi-finals vs Germany (26 June)
(France) Christian Karembeu	(yellow card) in Group B vs Spain (matchday 2; 15 June); (yellow card) in Quarter-finals vs Netherlands (22 June)	Semi-finals vs Czech Republic (26 June)
(Croatia) Igor Štimac	(red card) in Quarter-finals vs Germany (23 June)	Suspension served outside tournament
(Czech Republic) Jan Suchopárek	(yellow card) in Group B vs Italy (matchday 2; 14 June); (yellow card) in Quarter-finals vs Portugal (23 June)	Semi-finals vs France (26 June)
(Czech Republic) Radek Bejbl	(yellow card) in Group B vs Germany (matchday 1; 9 June); (yellow card) in Quarter-finals vs Portugal (23 June)	Semi-finals vs France (26 June)
(Czech Republic) Pavel Kuka	(yellow card) in Group B vs Italy (matchday 2; 14 June); (yellow card) in Quarter-finals vs Portugal (23 June)	Semi-finals vs France (26 June)
(Czech Republic) Radoslav Látal	(red card) in Quarter-finals vs Portugal (23 June)	Semi-finals vs France (26 June)
(Germany) Stefan Reuter	(yellow card) in Group C vs Czech Republic (matchday 1; 9 June); (yellow card) in Semi-finals vs England (26 June)	Final vs Czech Republic (30 June)
(Germany) Andreas Möller	(yellow card) in Group C vs Czech Republic (matchday 1; 9 June); (yellow card) in Semi-finals vs England (26 June)	Final vs Czech Republic (30 June)

=== Awards ===
Team of the Tournament

Goalkeepers	Defenders	Midfielders	Forwards
(England) David Seaman (Germany) Andreas Köpke	(Czech Republic) Radoslav Látal (France) Laurent Blanc (France) Marcel Desailly (Germany) Matthias Sammer (Italy) Paolo Maldini	(Czech Republic) Karel Poborský (England) Paul Gascoigne (England) Steve McManaman (France) Didier Deschamps (Germany) Dieter Eilts (Portugal) Rui Costa	(Bulgaria) Hristo Stoichkov (Croatia) Davor Šuker (Czech Republic) Pavel Kuka (England) Alan Shearer (France) Youri Djorkaeff

Golden Boot

Alan Shearer was awarded the Golden Boot award, after scoring five goals in the group stage and in the semi-finals against Germany.

- (England) Alan Shearer (5 goals)

UEFA Player of the Tournament

- (Germany) Matthias Sammer

== Marketing ==
=== Slogan and theme songs ===
The competition slogan was Football Comes Home reflecting that the sport's rules were first standardised in the United Kingdom. UEFA President Lennart Johansson had said that the organisation had felt it was time to bring the event "back to the motherland of football".

The slogan was incorporated into the competition's most popular song: "Three Lions" recorded by comedians David Baddiel and Frank Skinner with Britpop band the Lightning Seeds. Baddiel and Skinner were then strongly connected with football owing to their BBC show Fantasy Football League. Released as a single, the song topped the UK Singles Chart for a total of two weeks. It was promoted by a video featuring the England squad.

The song was prominently sung by England fans during all their games, and was also chanted by the German team upon parading the trophy in Berlin after the tournament. It was even referenced by future Prime Minister Tony Blair in an address at the 1996 Labour Party Conference with the line: "Seventeen years of hurt, never stopped us dreaming, Labour's coming home".

"Three Lions" was the official song of the England team, and is the song most strongly connected with the tournament, however the official song of the tournament was "We're in This Together" by Simply Red. The song was performed at the tournament's opening ceremony.

=== Merchandise and mascots ===
The British Royal Mint issued a commemorative £2 coin in 1996, which featured a representation of a football, "1996" in the centre, and 16 small rings representing the 16 competing teams. Further special coins were only issued in the Isle of Man and Gibraltar.

The official mascot, 'Goaliath', was designed in a similar fashion to the original World Cup mascot from the 1966 World Cup. Goaliath comprised a lion, the image on the English team crest, dressed in an England football strip and football boots whilst holding a football under his right arm.

=== Sponsorship ===
Event sponsors

- Canon
- Carlsberg
- Coca-Cola
- Fujifilm
- JVC
- MasterCard
- McDonald's
- Philips
- Snickers
- Vauxhall Motors
- Umbro

=== Video game ===
A video game tie-in was developed by Gremlin Interactive for Windows, MS-DOS, and the Sega Saturn. The Saturn version was the subject of considerable media hype and was a major system-seller for the system in the United Kingdom. Sega's Italian distributor Giochi Preziosi used the tournament as part of a football-themed promotion, offering a free football to purchasers of the Mega Drive. In Portugal, Sega also promoted its association with the tournament through the national team. Goalkeeper Vítor Baía later recalled that the Portugal squad had been given Mega Drive consoles to use while in camp during Euro 96, and that the players regularly played them.

== Controversies ==
=== Terrorist attack ===
A terrorist attack took place in Manchester on 15 June, one day before the group stage match between Germany and Russia was due to take place in the same city. The detonation of a van bomb in the city centre injured 212 people and caused an estimated £700 million worth of damage. Four days after the blast, the Provisional Irish Republican Army issued a statement in which it claimed responsibility, but regretted causing injury to civilians.

The Manchester bombing was the first and so far only major terrorist attack in the host city of an ongoing UEFA European Championship. The scheduled match at Old Trafford on the day following the bombing went ahead as planned after the stadium had been heavily guarded overnight and carefully searched; the game, in which Germany defeated Russia 3–0, was watched by a near capacity crowd of 50,700.

=== Empty seats ===
The aggregate attendance of 1,276,000 and average attendance of 41,158 per game were the highest for the European Championship (in its 16-team format) until the 2012 tournament. However, these numbers were based on the number of tickets sold rather than the number of spectators in the ground, which was often significantly lower. The large number of empty seats in most of the games not involving England was blamed on a number of factors: a lack of travelling fans from most of the other nations concerned, a lack of interest among locals for games not involving England, kick-offs before 5:00 pm that made it hard for children at school and adults at work to attend, steep ticket prices, and UEFA's policy of only selling tickets in blocks (where each block consisted of a set from each of three price bands).

=== Disorder ===
After England's defeat to Germany in the semi-finals, a large-scale riot took place in Trafalgar Square and the surrounding area. Further outbreaks of trouble occurred in the streets of several other towns. The police and German-made cars were targeted, with damage also caused to various other properties. A Russian student was stabbed in Brighton after attackers mistook him for being German.

Despite this outbreak, the tournament overall was free of hooliganism, helping rehabilitate England's reputation after their fans' conduct during the previous decades. UEFA's awarding of the tournament to England was in itself a further step in bringing the country back fully into the international fold, coming soon after their decision in 1990 to re-admit English clubs back into UEFA competitions after the indefinite ban issued to them following the Heysel Stadium disaster in 1985.
