= Christian Ziege =

German football player and manager

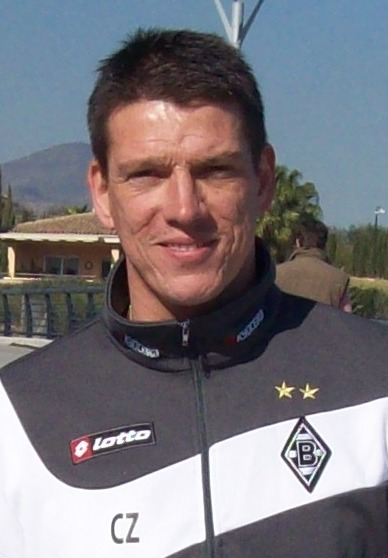
- Ziege with Mönchengladbach in 2008

Personal information
- Date of birth: 1 February 1972 (age 54)
- Place of birth: West Berlin, West Germany
- Height: 1.86 m (6 ft 1 in)
- Positions: Left midfielder; left-back

Youth career
- 1978–1981: FC Südstern 08 Berlin
- 1981–1985: TSV Rudow Berlin
- 1985–1990: FC Hertha 03 Zehlendorf

Senior career*
Years	Team	Apps	(Gls)
1990–1997	Bayern Munich	185	(38)
1997–1999	Milan	39	(4)
1999–2000	Middlesbrough	29	(6)
2000–2001	Liverpool	16	(1)
2001–2004	Tottenham Hotspur	47	(7)
2004–2005	Borussia Mönchengladbach	13	(0)
Total		329	(56)

International career
1991–1993	Germany U21	12	(3)
1992	Germany Olympic	1	(0)
1993–2004	Germany	72	(9)

Managerial career
- 2006–2007: Borussia Mönchengladbach U17 (head coach)
- 2007–2008: Borussia Mönchengladbach (director of football)
- 2008: Borussia Mönchengladbach (interim coach)
- 2008: Borussia Mönchengladbach (assistant coach)
- 2010: Arminia Bielefeld
- 2011: Germany U19
- 2011–2012: Germany U18
- 2012–2013: Germany U19
- 2013–2014: Germany U18
- 2014–2015: SpVgg Unterhaching
- 2015–2017: Atlético Baleares
- 2018: Ratchaburi Mitr Phol
- 2019–2022: FC Pinzgau
Medal record
Men's football
Representing Germany
FIFA World Cup
Runner-up	2002 Korea/Japan
UEFA European Championship
Winner	1996 England
- * Club domestic league appearances and goals

Christian Ziege (German pronunciation: [ˈkʁɪsti̯a(ː)n ˈtsiːɡə]; born 1 February 1972) is a German football manager and former player. He most recently coached FC Pinzgau.

Ziege started his playing career at Bayern Munich, where he won two Bundesliga titles and a UEFA Cup before moving to AC Milan, winning an Italian Scudetto. In 1999, he joined Middlesbrough of the English Premier League, where he was voted the club's Player of the Year in his only season. A year later, he joined Liverpool and was part of the squad that won a treble of the Football League Cup, the FA Cup and the UEFA Cup in 2000–01. In 2001, he moved to Tottenham Hotspur, before ending his career back in Germany with Borussia Mönchengladbach.

With the Germany national team, Ziege won UEFA Euro 1996 and finished runner-up at the 2002 FIFA World Cup. He also represented the country at UEFA Euro 2000, UEFA Euro 2004 and the 1998 FIFA World Cup. An attacking left wing-back, Ziege was considered a dead-ball specialist.

== Playing career ==
=== Club career ===
At club level, Ziege played for Bayern Munich (1990–97), AC Milan (1997–99) and Middlesbrough (1999–2000). The reason he left Milan was his conflict with manager Alberto Zaccheroni, who later reflected: "my biggest regret there [at Milan] was Christian Ziege. I tried to convince Ziege to play as a wing-back. I was sure he could have been great in that role. He had the technical ability of a number 10 – a great left foot with which he could score goals and provide assists – but he could also run up and down for 90 minutes. He never fully accepted the idea of not playing as a left-back, however, and after leaving AC Milan he didn’t have a great career".

In the summer of 2000, Liverpool made a £5.5m bid which exactly matched a get-out clause in Ziege's contract. Middlesbrough insisted they had received offers in excess of £8m for Ziege, but were forced contractually to allow Ziege to talk to Liverpool, who then signed him. He made his debut for Liverpool in a 3–2 home win over Manchester City on 9 September 2000, replacing Steven Gerrard in the second half. A combination of knee injuries and the improving form of Jamie Carragher, meant he was transferred to Tottenham Hotspur at the end of that season. He scored two goals during his spell at Liverpool; against Leeds in the league and Stoke in the League Cup. Ziege also contributed to their treble in the 2000–01 season. He came on as an extra time substitute in the 2001 Football League Cup Final and scored a penalty in the shootout as Liverpool defeated Birmingham City, but he was not part of the match days squads for either the 2001 FA Cup Final or 2001 UEFA Cup Final.

On 14 March 2002, Liverpool were fined £20,000 by The Football Association for having made an illegal approach for Ziege when he had been at Middlesbrough. The player himself was fined £10,000. Whilst at Spurs, he scored in the 2002 Football League Cup Final but he ended up on the losing side. However, by this time Ziege's injury problems were escalating, and by 2004 his contract was terminated by mutual consent so he could return to Germany.

Ziege returned to Germany with Borussia Mönchengladbach in June 2004, but announced his retirement in October 2005, having not played since the previous December due to a persistent ankle injury.

=== International career ===
Ziege was capped 72 times for Germany, scoring nine goals. Other than the Euro 96 win, he also played for his country at the 1998 and 2002 World Cups (during which he played the final game and sported a rather amusing mohawk), as well as Euro 2000 (he was a member of the Euro 2004 squad, but didn't play). Ziege was not initially named in Rudi Völler's UEFA Euro 2004 squad, but was then called up after an injury to Christian Rahn.

== Managerial career ==
=== Borussia Mönchengladbach ===
Following retirement as a player, Ziege picked up his UEFA diploma for coaching. In 2006, he moved into coaching with his last professional club, Borussia Mönchengladbach, where he was named manager of the club's Under-17 team, succeeding Thomas Schumacher. In 2006–07 the club's U17 team had won ten out of seventeen matches with Ziege in charge when, in March 2007, he was handed the role of Director of Football at the club, as the replacement for the outgoing Peter Pander. At the time of his appointment, with ten matches to go until the end of the season, Borussia Mönchengladbach were at the bottom of the Bundesliga, with five points between them and safety. On 5 October 2008, Ziege dismissed Jos Luhukay and became interim manager. The interim job lasted until 18 October 2008 when Hans Meyer became the new permanent manager. On 15 December 2008 Ziege left Borussia Mönchengladbach.

=== Arminia Bielefeld and German junior national teams ===
On 26 May 2010, Ziege signed a contract as manager of Arminia Bielefeld. However, his managerial career got off to a poor start with Arminia Bielefeld only picking up three points from a single win from eight games, the worst start to an Arminia Bielefeld season in twenty-three years. Ziege was released from his post as manager of Arminia Bielefeld on 6 November 2010 after a 2–0 defeat against FC Augsburg.

From April 2011, Ziege worked for the DFB. He first coached the German U-19, before taking over the U-18 side in August of the same year. Ziege's contract was not renewed. His contract expires in the summer of 2014.

=== SpVgg Unterhaching ===
Ziege became the head coach of SpVgg Unterhaching on 20 March 2014. Ziege's debut was a 1–1 draw against RB Leipzig. He resigned on 25 March 2015. His final match was a 2–1 loss to Stuttgarter Kickers on 21 March 2015. On 30 November 2015, Ziege signed with Segunda División B side Atlético Baleares as head coach.

=== Ratchaburi Mitr Phol ===
On 27 December 2017, Ratchaburi Mitr Phol of Thai League 1 officially announced the appointment of Ziege as their new head coach. However, he left them after two games of the new season, in the week commencing 19 February "by mutual consent".

=== FC Pinzgau ===
On 29 April 2019, Ziege was named head coach for Austrian Austrian Regionalliga side FC Pinzgau. He departed the club in September 2022.

== Personal life ==
Ziege was married to his wife, Pia, from 1997 to her death in 2024. They have two children, Atakan and Maria.

== Career statistics ==
=== Club ===
Appearances and goals by club, season and competition
Club	Season	League			National Cup		League Cup		Europe		Total	
Club	Season	Division	Apps	Goals	Apps	Goals	Apps	Goals	Apps	Goals	Apps	Goals
Bayern Munich	1990–91	Bundesliga	13	1	0	0	0	0	3	1	16	2
Bayern Munich	1991–92	Bundesliga	26	2	0	0			3	1	29	3
Bayern Munich	1992–93	Bundesliga	28	10	2	2					30	12
Bayern Munich	1993–94	Bundesliga	29	3	4	1			4	3	37	8
Bayern Munich	1994–95	Bundesliga	29	12	0	0	0	0	9	0	38	12
Bayern Munich	1995–96	Bundesliga	33	3	1	0			10	1	44	4
Bayern Munich	1996–97	Bundesliga	27	7	4	1			2	0	35	8
Bayern Munich	Total		185	38	11	4	0	0	31	6	227	48
Milan	1997–98	Serie A	22	2	5	0					27	2
Milan	1998–99	Serie A	17	2	3	0					20	2
Milan	Total		39	4	8	0			0	0	47	4
Middlesbrough	1999–2000	Premier League	29	6	1	0	3	1			33	7
Liverpool	2000–01	Premier League	16	1	3	0	4	1	9	0	32	2
Tottenham Hotspur	2001–02	Premier League	27	5	2	2	4	0			33	7
Tottenham Hotspur	2002–03	Premier League	12	2	0	0	0	0	0	0	12	2
Tottenham Hotspur	2003–04	Premier League	8	0	1	0	1	1			10	1
Tottenham Hotspur	Total		47	7	3	2	5	1	0	0	55	10
Borussia Mönchengladbach	2004–05	Bundesliga	13	0	1	0					14	0
Career total			329	56	27	6	12	3	40	6	396	68

=== International ===
Appearances and goals by national team and year
National team	Year	Apps	Goals
Germany	1993	7	0
Germany	1994	0	0
Germany	1995	6	1
Germany	1996	14	2
Germany	1997	7	0
Germany	1998	7	1
Germany	1999	4	3
Germany	2000	9	1
Germany	2001	9	0
Germany	2002	8	1
Germany	2003	0	0
Germany	2004	1	0
Total		72	9

Scores and results list Germany's goal tally first, score column indicates score after each Ziege goal.

List of international goals scored by Christian Ziege
No.	Date	Venue	Opponent	Score	Result	Competition
1.	6 September 1995	Frankenstadion, Nuremberg, Germany	Georgia	2–1	4–1	UEFA Euro 1996 qualifying
2.	4 June 1996	Carl-Benz-Stadion, Mannheim, Germany	Liechtenstein	5–1	9–1	Friendly
3.	9 June 1996	Old Trafford, Manchester, England	Czech Republic	1–0	2–0	UEFA Euro 1996
4.	25 March 1998	Carl-Benz-Stadion, Mannheim, Germany	Luxembourg	7–0	7–0	Friendly
5.	8 September 1999	Westfalenstadion, Dortmund, Germany	Northern Ireland	2–0	4–0	UEFA Euro 2000 qualifying
6.	8 September 1999	Westfalenstadion, Dortmund, Germany	Northern Ireland	3–0	4–0	UEFA Euro 2000 qualifying
7.	8 September 1999	Westfalenstadion, Dortmund, Germany	Northern Ireland	4–0	4–0	UEFA Euro 2000 qualifying
8.	23 February 2000	Amsterdam Arena, Amsterdam, Netherlands	Netherlands	1–1	1–2	Friendly
9.	27 March 2002	Ostseestadion, Rostock, Germany	United States	1–1	4–2	Friendly

=== Managerial record ===
As of 3 July 2019

Team	From	To	Record				
Team	From	To	G	W	D	L	
Borussia Mönchengladbach	5 October 2008	19 October 2008	1	0	1	0	0.00
Arminia Bielefeld	26 May 2010	6 November 2010	13	1	2	10	7.69
SpVgg Unterhaching	20 March 2014	25 March 2015	39	11	9	19	28.21
FC Pinzgau	29 April 2019	Present	6	3	1	2	

== Honours ==
Bayern Munich

- Bundesliga: 1993–94, 1996–97
- UEFA Cup: 1995–96

AC Milan

- Serie A: 1998–99

Liverpool

- FA Cup: 2000–01
- Football League Cup: 2000–01
- UEFA Cup: 2000–01

Tottenham Hotspur

- Football League Cup runner-up: 2001–02

Germany

- UEFA European Football Championship: 1996
- FIFA World Cup runner-up: 2002
