= Boselli =

Bosselli
- Language: Italian

Origin
- Meaning: Derived from boxwood
- Region of origin: Lombardy in northern Italy, particularly Milan

Other names
- Variant forms: Bossi, Bosio, Bossy and Bossie

Boselli is an Italian surname. Variations include Bosio and Bossi, the former being among the original derivations of both names. Also, Bossy and Bossie are two etymologically related forms found in French-speaking regions as well as in the United States. Notable people with the surname include:

- Antonio Boselli (16th century), Italian painter
- Élisabeth Boselli (1914–2005), French military and civilian pilot
- Enrico Boselli (born 1957), Italian politician and former leader of the Italian Democratic Socialists
- Felice Boselli (1650–1732), Italian Baroque painter
- Giacomo Boselli (c. 1744 – 1808), Italian sculptor and painter
- Juan Manuel Boselli (born 1999), Uruguayan footballer
- Juan Martín Boselli (born 1994), Uruguayan footballer
- Juan Sebastián Boselli (born 2003), Uruguayan footballer
- Mauro Boselli (writer) (born 1953), Italian comic book writer and editor
- Mauro Boselli (born 1985), Argentine footballer
- Milvia Boselli (born 1943), former Italian politician
- Nicola Boselli (born 1972), Italian footballer
- Orfeo Boselli (1597–1667), Italian sculptor
- Paolo Boselli (1838–1932), Italian politician and Prime Minister during World War I
- Pietro Boselli (born 1988), Italian engineer, former mathematics lecturer at University College London and model
- Sebastián Boselli (born 2003), Uruguayan footballer
- Tony Boselli (born 1972), American football player

== See also ==
- Bossio
