= Bossi (surname) =

- Language: Italian

Origin
- Meaning: Derived from boxwood
- Region of origin: Lombardy in northern Italy, particularly Milan

Other names
- Variant forms: Bosio, Boselli, Bossy and Bossie

Bossi is a surname native to the Lombardy region of Italy, particularly in Milan. Variations include Bosio and Boselli, the former being among the original derivations of "Bossi" and the latter being a common variation of Italian names. Bossy and Bossie are two etymologically related forms found in French-speaking regions as well as in the United States. The coat of arms and family standard are of a bovine bull holding the Latin phrase "In Domino Confido", which translates as "In God I trust". The bull is quartered in the solid gules (red) and argent (white) colors of the House of Savoy, set upon an azure field.

Etymologically, the name appears to be derived from two possible words. Boxwood—a prized wood historically used for landscaping or crafting—is Bosso (singular) or Bossi (plural) in Italian. Alternately, the name may also be derived from the plural of the genus Bos, which consists of both wild and domestic cattle. This possible relationship is reinforced by the bull on the coat of arms and family standard.

The surname can refer to the following people:

- Annalisa Bossi, born Anneliese Ullstein (1915–2015), Italian female tennis player
- Benigno Bossi (1727–1792), Italian engraver, painter, and stucco artist
- Carmelo Bossi (1939–2014), Italian boxer
- Costante Adolfo Bossi (1876–1953), Italian organist for the Milan Cathedral
- David N. Bossie (born 1965), American, President of Citizens United
- Elia Bossi (born 1994), Italian male volleyball player
- Emilio Bossi (1870–1920), Swiss freethinker, journalist, lawyer and writer
- Enea Bossi Sr. (1888–1963), Italian-American inventor and aviation pioneer
- Erma Bossi (1875–1952), German Expressionist painter
- Francesco Bossi (1525–1583), Roman Catholic prelate who served as Bishop of Novara, Perugia and Gravina
- Friedrich (Fritz) Bossi (1896–date of death unknown), Swiss cyclist, competitor at the 1924 Olympics
- Giovanni Bossi (born 1954), Italian equestrian competitor
- Giuseppe Bossi (1777–1815), Italian painter, writer, collector, and administrator of art
- Guglielmo Bossi (1901–date of death unknown), Italian cyclist
- Henri Bossi (born 1958), retired Luxembourgish footballer and later manager
- Johann Dominik Bossi, also known as Domenico Bossi (1767–1853), Italian painter
- Joseph Aurèle de Bossi (1758–1824), French politician and poet
- Joseph Bossi or Giuseppe Bossi (1911-date of death unknown), Swiss footballer
- Joseph Tipton Bossi, American Navy Reserve pilot
- Luigi Maria Bossi (1859–1919), Italian gynecologist and politician
- Marcel Bossi (born 1960), retired Luxembourgish football defender
- Marco Enrico Bossi (1861–1925), Italian organist and composer
- Mario Bossi (1909–2003), Italian footballer
- Maurice Bossy (1929–2008), Canadian politician
- Maxime Bossis (born 1955), French football player
- Michael Dean Bossy (1957–2022), Canadian ice hockey player
- Paul Bossi (1991), Luxembourgish professional football player
- Pietro Bossi, Italian marble craftsman in Dublin between 1785 and 1798, specialising in the scagliola technique
- Renzo Bossi (born 1988), Italian politician and son of Umberto Bossi
- Rolf Bossi (1923–2015), German criminal defense lawyer
- Roy Bossi (1894–1964), Australian rugby league footballer
- Umberto Bossi (1941–2026), Italian politician, as well as founder and former leader of Lega Nord
- Villi Bossi (1939), Italian sculptor

== See also ==
- Bossi (disambiguation)
- Bosso (surname), Italian surname
