= Bosse =

Bosse may refer to:

- Bosse (name)
- Bosse (musician), German singer and songwriter
- La Bosse (disambiguation)
- Benjamin Bosse High School, Evansville, IN, USA
- Bosse Field, stadium for minor league baseball team in Evansville, IN, USA

== See also ==
- Bossé (disambiguation)
