= Jamie Bosio =

Jamie Bosio may refer to:

- Jamie Bosio (footballer, born March 1991), Gibraltarian football defender
- Jamie Bosio (footballer, born September 1991), Gibraltarian futsal coach and former football defensive midfielder
