= Boisse (surname) =

Boisse is a French surname. Notable people with the surname include:

- Érik Boisse (born 1980), French fencer
- Noa Boissé (born 2006), French footballer
- Philippe Boisse (born 1955), French fencer

== See also ==
- Bosse (name)
