= Julie Corneo =

Italian miniature painter (c.1775–1825)

Julie Corneo (c. 1775–1825) was an Italian miniature painter.

== Biography ==
Julie (Giulia) Corneo born Grassi was a drawing teacher in the first years of 19th century at the College of the Noble Maidens of Milan. She was married with the landscape painter Gian Battista Corneo and in 1802 she is mentioned by Ugo Foscolo in the correspondence with Antonietta Fagnani Arese, Fosoclo's lover, in relation to the commission of her portrait miniature. The artist was in relationship not only with Giovanni Battista Gigola but also with Johann Dominik Bossi to whom she sent some works to be judged in Brera Academy in 1804. In the following year she participated to the event organized for the coronation of Napoleon as king of Italy and later, together her husband, lived in Paris for some years. Returned to Italy she continued to teach drawing and paint miniatures for the important families of Milan such as Belgioioso Crivelli Serbelloni Serbelloni and Sommariva. She probably died in the early months of 1825, when she was already a widow, in fact the court of Milan in March of that year summoned her heirs.

== Artwork ==
Her style was influenced not only by Cigola and Bossi but also by Antoine-Paul Vincent (1790 - 1825). She worked with very dense brush strokes and focused on the characteristics of the models' faces.

== Works ==
- "Portrait of Maria Seymour-Conway, Marchioness of Hertford" (1771 - 1856) wife of Francis Seymour-Conway, 3rd Marquess of Hertford, watercolor and gouache on ivory, signed. London, Wallace collection.
- "Portrait of a child with flowers", watercolor and gouache on ivory, signed.
- "Portrait of unknown gentleman", watercolor and gouache on ivory, signed.
- "Portrait of Jean Jacques Rousseau", watercolor and gouache on ivory, signed. Lázaro Galdiano Museum, Madrid
- "Portrait of young gentleman with earring", watercolor and gouache on ivory, signed.
- "Portrait of General of division of the Army of the French republic", watercolor and gouache on ivory, signed.
- "Portrait of a Lady with a book", watercolor on ivory, c.1805, unsigned but attributed, Royal Collection
- "Portrait of a Lady", watercolor on ivory, c.1805, unsigned but attributed, Royal Collection
- "River landscape with waterfall and fishermen" 1811, signed and dated, watercolor on paper.
- "A Lady, bust length, facing right, in décolleté blue dress with fur border and white underslip", watercolor and gouache on ivory, signed.
