= Bosio (surname) =

- Pronunciation: Italian: [ˈbɔːzjo]
- Language: Italian

Origin
- Languages: Frankish, Middle High German
- Origin: Boso
- Meaning: 'bad'
- Region of origin: Piedmont, Lombardy

Other names
- Variant forms: Bosi, Bosis, Bosio, De Bosio
- Related names: Boselli, Bosetti

Bosio is a surname of Italian origin.

The surname can refer to the following people:

- Angiolina Bosio (1830–1859), Italian operatic soprano
- Antonio Bosio (circa 1575–1629), Maltese scholar and explorer
- Antonio Bosio (general) (1885–1967), Italian general
- Catharine Mans Bosio, American biologist
- Bruno Bosio (1928–2010), Italian association football player
- Carlo Bosio (1916–1941), Italian lieutenant
- Chris Bosio (born 1963), former Major League Baseball pitcher
- Danilo Bosio (born 1972), Italian runner
- Edoardo Bosio (1864–1927), Italian-Swiss footballing innovator
- Enrico Bosio (1850–1935), Italian theologian
- Ezequiel Bosio (born 1985), Argentine racing driver
- Ferdinando Bosio (1824–1879), Italian priest
- Francesca Bosio (born 1997), Italian volleyball player
- Franco Bosio (born 1954), Italian rebus maker
- François Joseph Bosio (1769–1845), French sculptor
- Giacomo Bosio (16th century), Italian knight
- Gianfranco De Bosio (1924–2022), Italian film director
- Gianni Bosio (1923–1971), Italian historian
- Giovanni Battista Bosio (1892–1967), Italian bishop
- Gherardo Bosio (1903–1941), Italian architect
- Guido Bosio (1899-1963) (1899–1963), Italian association football player
- Guido Bosio (1911-1963) (1911–1963), Italian association football player
- Harald Bosio (20th century), Austrian Nordic combined skier
- Jamie Bosio (footballer, born March 1991), Gibraltarian association football player
- Jamie Bosio (footballer, born September 1991), Irish association football player
- Jay Bosio (born 1991), Gibraltarian association football player
- Laura Bosio (born 1953), Italian writer
- Lauro Bosio (1885–1915), Italian association football player
- Luciano Bosio (born 1959), Italian basketball player
- Sebastiano Bosio (1929–1981), Italian surgeon
- Tommaso Bosio (16th century), Italian bishop
- Victoria Bosio (born 1994), Argentine tennis player
- Zeta Bosio (born 1959), Argentine musician

== See also ==
- Bossio
