= Croatia national football team results (2010–2019) =

This is a list of the Croatia national football team results from 2010 to 2019.

Croatia missed out on the 2010 FIFA World Cup, but then qualified for UEFA Euro 2012, the 2014 FIFA World Cup, and UEFA Euro 2016, making it to the second round in the latter. Then, at the 2018 FIFA World Cup, the team achieved the best result in its history: it finished second and won the silver medal as it reached the final and lost to France.

Afterwards, Croatia entered League A of the inaugural 2018–19 edition of the UEFA Nations League. Based on its final ranking the team would have been relegated to League B, but a revamp of the competition's format meant it remained in League A for the following season. At the end of the decade, Croatia qualified for UEFA Euro 2020.

== Key ==
Win
Draw
Loss

As per statistical convention in football, matches decided in extra time are counted as wins and losses, while matches decided by penalty shoot-outs are counted as draws.

== By year ==
=== 2010 ===
3 March 2010 Friendly	Belgium	0–1	Croatia	Brusells, Belgium
	Vertonghen (yellow card) 68'	Report	Vukojević (yellow card) 61'; Kranjčar 63'	Stadium: King Baudouin Stadium; Attendance: 20,000; Referee: Gianluca Rocchi (Italy); Assistant referees: Massimiliano Grilli (Italy); Stefano Papi (Italy)

19 May 2010 Friendly	Austria	0–1	Croatia	Klagenfurt, Austria
		Report	Bilić 86'	Stadium: Wörthersee Stadion; Attendance: 20,000; Referee: Kevin Blom (Netherlands); Assistant referees: Patrick Langkamp (Netherlands); Nicky Siebert (Netherlands)

23 May 2010 Friendly	Croatia	2–0	Wales	Osijek, Croatia
	Lovren (yellow card) 7'; Rakitić 45'; Gabrić 82'	Report	Earnshaw (yellow card) 30'	Stadium: Stadion Gradski vrt Attendance: 15,000; Referee: Slavko Vinčić (Slovenia); Assistant referees: Milan Kogej (Slovenia); Gregor Rojko (Slovenia)

26 May 2010 Friendly	Estonia	0–0	Croatia	Tallinn, Estonia
		Report	Badelj (yellow card) 53'	Stadium: A. Le Coq Arena; Attendance: 4,800; Referee: Michael Svendsen (Denmark); Assistant referees: Niels Hog (Denmark); Jakob Bille (Denmark)

11 August 2010 Friendly	Slovakia	1–1	Croatia	Bratislava, Slovakia
	Stoch 50'; Škrtel (yellow card) 59'	Report	Jelavić 54'; Šimunić (yellow card) 55'	Stadium: Štadión Pasienky; Attendance: 6,366; Referee: Radek Matějek (Czech Republic); Assistant referees: Martin Wilczek (Czech Republic); Ivo Chytil (Czech Republic)

3 September 2010 Euro 2012 qualif, Gr F	Latvia	0–3	Croatia	Riga, Latvia
	Mihadjuks (yellow card) 76'; Verpakovskis (yellow card) 76'	Report	Vukojević (yellow card) 37'; Petrić 43'; Olić 51'; Srna 82' (yellow card) 90'	Stadium: Skonto Stadium; Attendance: 7,400; Referee: Björn Kuipers (Netherlands); Assistant referees: Berry Simons (Netherlands); Sander van Roekel (Netherlands); Fourth official: Richard Liesveld (Netherlands)

7 September 2010 Euro 2012 qualif, Gr F	Croatia	0–0	Greece	Zagreb, Croatia
	Rakitić (yellow card) 62'; Srna (yellow card) 68'	Report	Torosidis (yellow card) 16'; Tzavellas (yellow card) 46'; Papastathopoulos (yellow card) 79'	Stadium: Stadion Maksimir; Attendance: 33,000; Referee: Claus Bo Larsen (Denmark); Assistant referees: Torben Jensen (Denmark); Anders Norrestrand (Denmark); Fourth official: Jakob Kehlet (Denmark)

9 October 2010 Euro 2012 qualif, Gr F	Israel	1–2	Croatia	Ramat Gan, Israel
	Keinan (yellow card) 35'; Shechter (yellow card) 36' (goal) 81'; Ben Haim (yellow card) 65'; Golasa (yellow card) 88'	Report	Kranjčar 36' (pen.), 41' (yellow card) 59'; Vukojević (yellow card) 90+3'	Stadium: Ramat Gan Stadium; Attendance: 25,000; Referee: Wolfgang Stark (Germany); Assistant referees: Jan-Hendrik Salver (Germany); Mike Pickel (Germany); Fourth official: Deniz Aytekin (Germany)

12 October 2010 Friendly	Croatia	2–1	Norway	Zagreb, Croatia
	Mandžukić 35'; Kranjčar 49'	Report	Abdellaoue 21'; Demidov (yellow card) 29'; Pedersen (yellow card) 68'	Stadium: Stadion Maksimir; Attendance: 3,000; Referee: Damir Skomina (Slovenia); Assistant referees: Andrej Kokolj (Slovenia); Matej Žunič (Slovenia)

17 November 2010 Euro 2012 qualif, Gr F	Croatia	3–0	Malta	Zagreb, Croatia
	Kranjčar 18', 42'; Srna (yellow card) 74'; Kalinić 81'	Report	Grima (yellow card) 84'	Stadium: Stadion Maksimir; Attendance: 12,000; Referee: Duarte Gomes (Portugal); Assistant referees: Tiago Trigo (Portugal); Venâncio Tomé (Portugal); Fourth official: Carlos Xistra (Portugal)

=== 2011 ===
9 February 2011 Friendly	Croatia	4–2	Czech Republic	Pula, Croatia
	Eduardo 10'; Kalinić 13', 61'; Dujmović (yellow card) 62'; Iličević 82'	Report	Sivok 20'; Rosický 45+1'; Kadlec (yellow card) 59'	Stadium: Stadion Aldo Drosina; Attendance: 9,000; Referee: Daniele Orsato (Italy); Assistant referees: Mauro Tonolini (Italy); Riccardo Di Fiore (Italy)

26 March 2011 Euro 2012 qualif, Gr F	Georgia	1–0	Croatia	Tbilisi, Georgia
	Martsvaladze (yellow card) 71'; Kobiashvili 90'	Report	Dujmović (yellow card) 52'; Kranjčar (yellow card) 66'	Stadium: Boris Paichadze; Attendance: 55,000; Referee: Paolo Tagliavento (Italy); Assistant referees: Luca Maggiani (Italy); Nicola Nicoletti (Italy); Fourth official: Paolo Valeri (Italy)

29 March 2011 Friendly	France	0–0	Croatia	Paris, France
	Diarra (yellow card) 69'; Réveillère (yellow card) 82'	Report	Lovren (yellow card) 30'; Vukojević (yellow card) 43'; Srna (yellow card) 76'; Vida (yellow card) 84'	Stadium: Stade de France; Attendance: 70,000; Referee: Alan Kelly (Republic of Ireland); Assistant referees: Damien MacGraith (Republic of Ireland); Marc Douglas (Republic of Ireland)

3 June 2011 Euro 2012 qualif, Gr F	Croatia	2–1	Georgia	Split, Croatia
	Mandžukić 76'; Kalinić 78' (yellow card) 78'	Report	Kankava 17'; Iashvili (yellow card) 26'; Khubutia (yellow card) 75'	Stadium: Stadion Poljud; Attendance: 28,000; Referee: Stefan Johannesson (Sweden); Assistant referees: Henrik Andrén (Sweden); Joakim Flink (Sweden); Fourth official: Michael Lerjéus (Sweden)

10 August 2011 Friendly	Republic of Ireland	0–0	Croatia	Dublin, Republic of Ireland
	Gibson (yellow card) 55'	Report	Vukojević (yellow card) 51'	Stadium: Aviva Stadium; Attendance: 20,000; Referee: Tom Harald Hagen (Norway); Assistant referees: Svein Inge Wiken (Norway); Dag Roger Nebben (Norway)

2 September 2011 Euro 2012 qualif, Gr F	Malta	1–3	Croatia	Attard, Malta
	Fenech (yellow card) 25'; Mifsud 38'; Failla (yellow card) 66'	Report	Vukojević 11'; Badelj 32'; Mandžukić (yellow card) 35'; Ćorluka (yellow card) 51'; Lovren 68'	Stadium: Ta' Qali; Attendance: 3,500; Referee: Tony Chapron (France); Assistant referees: Emmanuel Boisdenghien (France); Fredji Harchay (France); Fourth official: Fredy Fautrel (France)

6 September 2011 Euro 2012 qualif, Gr F	Croatia	3–1	Israel	Zagreb, Croatia
	Modrić 47'; Eduardo 55', 57'; Srna (yellow card) 62'; Strinić (yellow card) 76'	Report	Ben Harush (yellow card) 38'; Hemed 44'; Zahavi (yellow card) 45+2'; Ben Haim (red card) 51'	Stadium: Stadion Maksimir; Attendance: 15,000; Referee: Carlos Velasco Carballo (Spain); Assistant referees: Juan Carlos Yuste Jiménez (Spain); Roberto Alonso (Spain)

7 October 2011 Euro 2012 qualif, Gr F	Greece	2–0	Croatia	Piraeus, Greece
	Karagounis (yellow card) 40'; Zaradoukas (yellow card) 45+5'; Tzorvas (yellow card) 60'; Samaras (yellow card) 65' (goal) 71'; Gekas 79'; Papadopoulos (yellow card) 81'	Report	Eduardo (yellow card) 45+2'; Jelavić (yellow card) 60'; Kalinić (yellow card) 77'; Lovren (yellow card) 90+1'	Stadium: Karaiskakis Stadium; Attendance: 27,316; Referee: Howard Webb (England); Assistant referees: Jake Collin (England); Peter Kirkup (England); Fourth official: Mike Dean (England)

11 October 2011 Euro 2012 qualif, Gr F	Croatia	2–0	Latvia	Rijeka, Croatia
	Eduardo 66'; Mandžukić 72'	Report	Kļava (yellow card) 35'; Rugins (yellow card) 38'	Stadium: Stadion Kantrida; Attendance: 8,000; Referee: Antony Gautier (France); Assistant referees: Michaël Annonier (France); Frédéric Cano (France); Fourth official: Said Ennjimi (France)

11 November 2011 Euro 2012 qualif, play-off	Turkey	0–3	Croatia	Istanbul, Turkey
	Balta (yellow card) 64'; Belözoğlu (yellow card) 66'; Sarıoğlu (yellow card) 71'; Turan (yellow card) 87'	Report	Olić 2' (yellow card) 69'; Mandžukić 32'; Ćorluka (yellow card) 35' (goal) 51'; Dujmović (yellow card) 41'	Stadium: Türk Telekom Stadium; Attendance: 47,000; Referee: Felix Brych (Germany); Assistant referees: Thorsten Schiffner (Germany); Mark Borsch (Germany); Fourth official: Florian Meyer (Germany)

15 November 2011 Euro 2012 qualif, play-off	Croatia	0–0 (3–0 agg.)	Turkey	Zagreb, Croatia
	Vida (yellow card) 18'; Mandžukić (yellow card) 45+2'	Report	Erkin (yellow card) 6'; Balcı (yellow card) 22'; Korkmaz (yellow card) 45+2'; Altıntop (yellow card) 59'; İnan (yellow card) 81'	Stadium: Stadion Maksimir; Attendance: 30,000; Referee: Pedro Proença (Portugal); Assistant referees: Bertino Miranda (Portugal); Ricardo Santos (Portugal); Fourth official: Jorge Sousa (Portugal)

=== 2012 ===
29 February 2012 Friendly	Croatia	1–3	Sweden	Zagreb, Croatia
	Vida (yellow card) 35'; Mandžukić (yellow card) 37'; Olsson 45' (o.g.); Šimunić (yellow card) 81'	Report	Ibrahimović 14' (pen.); Larsson 47', 69'	Stadium: Stadion Maksimir; Attendance: 10,000; Referee: Mitja Žganec (Slovenia); Assistant referees: Andrej Kokolj (Slovenia); Bojan Ul (Slovenia)

25 May 2012 Friendly	Croatia	3–1	Estonia	Pula, Croatia
	Ćorluka 16'; Kalinić 20'; Vukojević 81'	Report	Konsa (yellow card) 46'; Vassiljev 83'	Stadium: Stadion Aldo Drosina; Attendance: 8,000; Referee: Mihály Fábián (Hungary); Assistant referees: Zsolt Szpisják (Hungary); Zsolt Varga (Hungary)

2 June 2012 Friendly	Norway	1–1	Croatia	Oslo, Norway
	Braaten (yellow card) 45'; Elyounoussi 90+2'	Report	Jelavić (yellow card) 43'; Srna (yellow card) 53'; Eduardo 79'; Vukojević (yellow card) 82'	Stadium: Ullevaal Stadion; Attendance: 14,208; Referee: Sergei Karasev (Russia); Assistant referees: Anton Averianov (Russia); Dmitri Mosyakin (Russia)

10 June 2012 Euro 2012, Gr C	Republic of Ireland	1–3	Croatia	Poznań, Poland
	St Ledger 19'; Andrews (yellow card) 45+1'	Report	Mandžukić 3', 49'; Jelavić 43'; Modrić (yellow card) 53'; Kranjčar (yellow card) 84'	Stadium: Miejski; Attendance: 39,550; Referee: Björn Kuipers (Netherlands); Assistant referees: Sander van Roekel (Netherlands); Erwin Zeinstra (Netherlands); Fourth official: Viktor Shvetsov (Ukraine); Goal-line assistants: Pol van Boekel (Netherlands); Richard Liesveld (Netherlands)

14 June 2012 Euro 2012, Gr C	Italy	1–1	Croatia	Poznań, Poland
	Pirlo 39'; Motta (yellow card) 56'; Montolivo (yellow card) 80'	Report	Mandžukić 72'; Schildenfeld (yellow card) 86'	Stadium: Miejski; Attendance: 37,096; Referee: Howard Webb (England); Assistant referees: Peter Kirkup (England); Michael Mullarkey (England); Fourth official: Pavel Královec (Czech Republic); Goal-line assistants: Martin Atkinson (England); Mark Clattenburg (England)

18 June 2012 Euro 2012, Gr C	Croatia	0–1	Spain	Gdańsk, Poland
	Ćorluka (yellow card) 27'; Srna (yellow card) 44'; Strinić (yellow card) 53'; Mandžukić (yellow card) 90'; Jelavić (yellow card) 90+1'; Rakitić (yellow card) 90+3'	Report	Navas 88'	Stadium: PGE Arena; Attendance: 38,371; Referee: Wolfgang Stark (Germany); Assistant referees: Jan-Hendrik Salver (Germany); Mike Pickel (Germany); Fourth official: Richard Liesveld (Netherlands); Goal-line assistants: Florian Meyer (Germany); Deniz Aytekin (Germany)

15 August 2012 Friendly	Croatia	2–4	Switzerland	Split, Croatia
	Eduardo 20', 64'	Report	Xhaka 11'; Barnetta 37'; Gavranović 51', 81'	Stadium: Stadion Poljud; Attendance: 10,000; Referee: Antonio Damato (Italy); Assistant referees: Massimiliano Grilli (Italy); Riccardo Di Fiore (Italy)

7 September 2012 2014 World Cup qualif, Gr A	Croatia	1–0	Macedonia	Zagreb, Croatia
	Šimunić (yellow card) 40'; Kranjčar (yellow card) 56'; Vukojević (yellow card) 59'; Jelavić 69' (yellow card) 90+3'	Report	Demiri (yellow card) 60'; Georgievski (yellow card) 89'	Stadium: Stadion Maksimir; Attendance: 13,883; Referee: Alon Yefet (Israel); Assistant referees: Amihay Yehoshua Mozes (Israel); Abed Al Ramili (Israel); Fourth official: Menashe Masiah (Israel)

11 September 2012 2014 World Cup qualif, Gr A	Belgium	1–1	Croatia	Brussels, Belgium
	Gillet 45+1' (yellow card) 67'; Dembélé (yellow card) 65'	Report	Perišić 6'; Srna (yellow card) 10'; Schildenfeld (yellow card) 48'	Stadium: King Baudouin Stadium; Attendance: 39,987; Referee: Alberto Undiano Mallenco (Spain); Assistant referees: Roberto Díaz (Spain); Raúl Cabañero (Spain); Fourth official: Carlos Clos Gómez (Spain)

12 October 2012 2014 World Cup qualif, Gr A	Macedonia	1–2	Croatia	Skopje, Macedonia
	Ristić (yellow card) 8'; Ibraimi 16'; Pandev (yellow card) 90'	Report	Ćorluka 33' (yellow card) 64'; Rakitić 60'; Vukojević (yellow card) 69'; Modrić (yellow card) 74'	Stadium: Philip II Arena; Attendance: 25,230; Referee: Peter Rasmussen (Denmark); Assistant referees: Henrik Sønderby (Denmark); Lars Rix (Denmark); Fourth official: Michael Johansen (Denmark)

16 October 2012 2014 World Cup qualif, Gr A	Croatia	2–0	Wales	Osijek, Croatia
	Lovren (yellow card) 21'; Mandžukić 27'; Eduardo 57'; Strinić (yellow card) 81'	Report	Gunter (yellow card) 51'	Stadium: Stadion Gradski vrt Attendance: 17,500; Referee: Alexandru Tudor (Romania); Assistant referees: Cristian Nica (Romania); Aurel Onița (Romania); Fourth official: Radu Petrescu (Romania)

=== 2013 ===
6 February 2013 Friendly	South Korea	0–4	Croatia	London, England
		Report	Mandžukić 33'; Srna 41'; Jelavić 57'; Petrić 85'	Stadium: Craven Cottage; Attendance: 1,500; Referee: Michael Oliver (England); Assistant referees: Simon Long (England); Darren England (England)

22 March 2013 2014 World Cup qualif, Gr A	Croatia	2–0	Serbia	Zagreb, Croatia
	Mandžukić 23'; Olić 37'	Report	Kolarov (yellow card) 36'; Subotić (yellow card) 85'; Petrović (yellow card) 90+1'	Stadium: Stadion Maksimir; Attendance: 35,722; Referee: Cüneyt Çakır (Turkey); Assistant referees: Bahattin Duran (Turkey); Tarık Ongun (Turkey); Fourth official: Barış Şimşek (Turkey)

26 March 2013 2014 World Cup qualif, Gr A	Wales	1–2	Croatia	Swansea, Wales
	Bale 21' (pen.); Robson-Kanu (yellow card) 41'	Report	Ćorluka (yellow card) 6'; Lovren (yellow card) 20' (goal) 77'; Modrić (yellow card) 66'; Kovačić (yellow card) 70'; Eduardo 87'	Stadium: Liberty Stadium; Attendance: 12,534; Referee: Luca Banti (Italy); Assistant referees: Riccardo Di Fiore (Italy); Nicola Nicoletti (Italy); Fourth official: Mauro Bergonzi (Italy)

7 June 2013 2014 World Cup qualif, Gr A	Croatia	0–1	Scotland	Zagreb, Croatia
	Rakitić (yellow card) 77'	Report	Snodgrass 26'; McGregor (yellow card) 45+3'; McArthur (yellow card) 78'; Whittaker (yellow card) 90+2'	Stadium: Stadion Maksimir; Attendance: 25,016; Referee: David Fernández Borbalán (Spain); Assistant referees: Jesús Calvo (Spain); Raúl Cabañero (Spain); Fourth official: Carlos Clos Gómez (Spain)

10 June 2013 Friendly	Croatia	0–1	Portugal	Geneva, Switzerland
	Vukojević (yellow card) 61'	Report	Ronaldo 36'	Stadium: Stade de Genève; Attendance: 13,000; Referee: Stephan Studer (Switzerland); Assistant referees: Jean-Yves Wicht (Switzerland); Sladan Josipovic (Switzerland)

14 August 2013 Friendly	Liechtenstein	2–3	Croatia	Vaduz, Liechtenstein
	Christen 31'; Polverino 77'	Report	Eduardo 21', 86'; Rebić 67'	Stadium: Rheinpark Stadion; Attendance: 2,800; Referee: Sascha Amhof (Switzerland); Assistant referees: Sladan Josipovic (Switzerland); Charles Helbling (Switzerland)

6 September 2013 2014 World Cup qualif, Gr A	Serbia	1–1	Croatia	Belgrade, Serbia
	Mitrović (yellow card) 32' (goal) 66'; Tošić (yellow card) 38'; Fejsa (yellow card) 45'; Matić (yellow card) 68' (yellow card) 75' (red card)	Report	Eduardo (yellow card) 42'; Mandžukić 53'; Vukojević (yellow card) 64'; Šimunić (red card) 81'; Srna (yellow card) 86'	Stadium: Red Star Stadium; Attendance: 30,000; Referee: Felix Brych (Germany); Assistant referees: Mark Borsch (Germany); Stefan Lupp (Germany); Fourth official: Florian Meyer (Germany)

10 September 2013 Friendly	South Korea	1–2	Croatia	Seoul, South Korea
	Lee Keun-ho 90+4'	Report	Vida 63' (yellow card) 88'; Kalinić 69'; Perišić (yellow card) 74'; Benko (yellow card) 81'	Stadium: Seoul World Cup Stadium; Attendance: 40,723; Referee: Minoru Tōjō (Japan); Assistant referees: Akane Yagi (Japan); Shinji Ochi (Japan)

11 October 2013 2014 World Cup qualif, Gr A	Croatia	1–2	Belgium	Zagreb, Croatia
	Mandžukić (yellow card) 32'; Vrsaljko (yellow card) 41'; Ćorluka (yellow card) 45+1'; Kranjčar 84'; Modrić (yellow card) 87'	Report	Lukaku 16', 38'; Fellaini (yellow card) 61'	Stadium: Stadion Maksimir; Attendance: 13,000; Referee: Howard Webb (England); Assistant referees: Michael Mullarkey (England); Darren Cann (England); Fourth official: Mike Dean (England)

15 October 2013 2014 World Cup qualif, Gr A	Scotland	2–0	Croatia	Glasgow, Scotland
	Snodgrass 28'; Morrison (yellow card) 55'; Naismith 73'	Report	Vukojević (yellow card) 46'	Stadium: Hampden Park; Attendance: 30,172; Referee: Ovidiu Hațegan (Romania); Assistant referees: Cristian Nica (Romania); Octavian Șovre (Romania); Fourth official: Constantin Colțescu (Romania)

15 November 2013 2014 World Cup qualif, play-off	Iceland	0–0	Croatia	Reykjavík, Iceland
	Ó. Skúlason (red card) 50'	Report		Stadium: Laugardalsvöllur; Attendance: 9,767; Referee: Alberto Undiano Mallenco (Spain); Assistant referees: Roberto Díaz (Spain); Raúl Cabañero (Spain); Fourth official: Carlos Clos Gómez (Spain)

19 November 2013 2014 World Cup qualif, play-off	Croatia	2–0 (2–0 agg.)	Iceland	Zagreb, Croatia
	Olić (yellow card) 7'; Mandžukić 27' (red card) 38'; Srna 47'; Šimunić (yellow card) 51'	Report	R. Sigurðsson (yellow card) 44'; Hallfreðsson (yellow card) 85'	Stadium: Stadion Maksimir; Attendance: 22,612; Referee: Björn Kuipers (Netherlands); Assistant referees: Sander van Roekel (Netherlands); Erwin Zeinstra (Netherlands); Fourth official: Pol van Boekel (Netherlands)

=== 2014 ===
5 March 2014 Friendly	Switzerland	2–2	Croatia	St. Gallen, Switzerland
	Drmić 34', 41'; Lichtsteiner (yellow card) 43'	Report	Olić 39', 54' (yellow card) 86'; Srna (yellow card) 79'	Stadium: AFG Arena; Attendance: 17,200; Referee: Hugo Miguel (Portugal); Assistant referees: Ricardo Santos (Portugal); Paulo Soares (Portugal)

31 May 2014 Friendly	Croatia	2–1	Mali	Osijek, Croatia
	Perišić 15', 64'	Report	Traoré 79'	Stadium: Stadion Gradski vrt Attendance: 15,212; Referee: István Vad (Hungary); Assistant referees: Oszkár Lémon (Hungary); Róbert Kispál (Hungary)

7 June 2014 Friendly	Croatia	1–0	Australia	Salvador, Brazil
	Vida (yellow card) 44'; Jelavić 58'; Mandžukić (yellow card) 64'; Srna (yellow card) 84'	Report		Stadium: Estádio de Pituaçu; Attendance: 15,212; Referee: Francisco Carlos do Nascimento (Brazil); Assistant referees: Alessandro Matos (Brazil); Cleriston Clay (Brazil)

12 June 2014 2014 World Cup, Gr A	Brazil	3–1	Croatia	São Paulo, Brazil
	Neymar (yellow card) 27' (goal) 29', 71' (pen.); Gustavo (yellow card) 88'; Oscar 90+1'	Report	Marcelo 11' (o.g.); Ćorluka (yellow card) 66'; Lovren (yellow card) 69'	Stadium: Arena Corinthians; Attendance: 62,103; Referee: Yuichi Nishimura (Japan); Assistant referees: Toru Sagara (Japan); Toshiyuki Nagi (Japan); Fourth official: Alireza Faghani (Iran); Man of the Match: Neymar

18 June 2014 2014 World Cup, Gr A	Cameroon	0–4	Croatia	Manaus, Brazil
	Song (red card) 40'	Report	Olić 11'; Perišić 48'; Mandžukić 61', 73'; Eduardo (yellow card) 89'	Stadium: Arena da Amazônia; Attendance: 39,982; Referee: Pedro Proença (Portugal); Assistant referees: Tiago Trigo (Portugal); Bertino Miranda (Portugal); Fourth official: Walter López Castellanos (Guatemala); Man of the Match: Mario Mandžukić

23 June 2014 2014 World Cup, Gr A	Croatia	1–3	Mexico	Recife, Brazil
	Rakitić (yellow card) 9'; Perišić 87'; Rebić (red card) 89'	Report	Márquez (yellow card) 39' (goal) 72'; Vázquez (yellow card) 66'; Guardado 75'; Hernández 82'	Stadium: Itaipava Arena Pernambuco; Attendance: 41,212; Referee: Ravshan Irmatov (Uzbekistan); Assistant referees: Abdukhamidullo Rasulov (Uzbekistan); Bakhadyr Kochkarov (Kyrgyzstan); Fourth official: Sidi Alioum (Cameroon); Man of the Match: Rafael Márquez

4 September 2014 Friendly	Croatia	2–0	Cyprus	Pula, Croatia
	Mandžukić 17', 58'; Pašalić (yellow card) 62'	Report		Stadium: Stadion Aldo Drosina; Attendance: 5,000; Referee: Marco Guida (Italy); Assistant referees: Matteo Passeri (Italy); Alessandro Giallatini (Italy)

9 September 2014 Euro 2016 qualif, Gr H	Croatia	2–0	Malta	Zagreb, Croatia
	Mandžukić (yellow card) 31'; Modrić 46'; Kramarić 81'	Report	Borg (red card) 31'; Fenech (yellow card) 59'	Stadium: Stadion Maksimir; Attendance: 8,333; Referee: Vladislav Bezborodov (Russia); Assistant referees: Nikolai Golubev (Russia); Maksim Gavrilin (Russia); Fourth official: Valeri Danchenko (Russia); Goal-line assistants: Sergey Ivanov (Russia); Mikhail Vilkov (Russia)

10 October 2014 Euro 2016 qualif, Gr H	Bulgaria	0–1	Croatia	Sofia, Bulgaria
	Zanev (yellow card) 15'	Report	Brozović (yellow card) 23'; Bodurov 36' (o.g.); Vida (yellow card) 51'; Olić (yellow card) 84'	Stadium: Vasil Levski National Stadium; Attendance: 29,733; Referee: Antonio Mateu Lahoz (Spain); Assistant referees: Pau Cebrián Devís (Spain); Jon Núñez Fernández (Spain); Fourth official: Roberto del Palomar (Spain); Goal-line assistants: Jesús Gil Manzano (Spain); Juan Martínez Munuera (Spain)

13 October 2014 Euro 2016 qualif, Gr H	Croatia	6–0	Azerbaijan	Osijek, Croatia
	Kramarić 11'; Perišić 34', 45'; Brozović 45+1'; Modrić 57' (pen.); Sadygov 61' (o.g.)	Report	Ramaldanov (yellow card) 16'; Ramazanov (yellow card) 36'; Allahverdiyev (yellow card) 55'	Stadium: Stadion Gradski vrt Attendance: 16,021; Referee: Stephan Studer (Switzerland); Assistant referees: Jean-Yves Wicht (Switzerland); Sandro Pozzi (Switzerland); Fourth official: Vital Jobin (Switzerland); Goal-line assistants: Alain Bieri (Switzerland); Sascha Amhof (Switzerland)

12 November 2014 Friendly	Argentina	2–1	Croatia	London, England
	Agüero 49'; Messi 57' (pen.)	Report	Sharbini 11'	Stadium: Boleyn Ground; Attendance: 14,000; Referee: Andre Marriner (England); Assistant referees: Peter Kirkup (England); Gary Beswick (England)

16 November 2014 Euro 2016 qualif, Gr H	Italy	1–1	Croatia	Milan, Italy
	Candreva 11'; Immobile (yellow card) 46'	Report	Perišić 15' (yellow card) 65'; Kovačić (yellow card) 37'	Stadium: San Siro; Attendance: 16,021; Referee: Björn Kuipers (Netherlands); Assistant referees: Sander van Roekel (Netherlands); Erwin Zeinstra (Netherlands); Fourth official: Mario Diks (Netherlands); Goal-line assistants: Pol van Boekel (Netherlands); Richard Liesveld (Netherlands)

=== 2015 ===
28 March 2015 Euro 2016 qualif, Gr H	Croatia	5–1	Norway	Zagreb, Croatia
	Brozović 30'; Perišić 53'; Olić 65'; Ćorluka (yellow card) 68' (yellow card) 74' (red card); Schildenfeld 87'; Pranjić 90+4'	Report	Linnes (yellow card) 31'; Elyounoussi (yellow card) 35'; Nordtveit (yellow card) 35'; Nyland (yellow card) 66'; Tettey 80'; Samuelsen (yellow card) 81'	Stadium: Stadion Maksimir; Attendance: 23,219; Referee: Carlos Velasco Carballo (Spain); Assistant referees: Juan Carlos Yuste Jiménez (Spain); Roberto Alonso (Spain); Fourth official: Pau Cebrián Devís (Spain); Goal-line assistants: Carlos del Cerro Grande (Spain); Fernando Teixeira (Spain)

7 June 2015 Friendly	Croatia	4–0	Gibraltar	Varaždin, Croatia
	Sharbini 7'; Kovačić 15'; Jedvaj (yellow card) 31'; Mandžukić 53' (pen.); Kramarić 79'	Report	Bosio (yellow card) 53'	Stadium: Stadion Varteks; Attendance: 7,737; Referee: Matej Jug (Slovenia); Assistant referees: Andraž Kovačič (Slovenia); Manuel Vidali (Slovenia)

12 June 2015 Euro 2016 qualif, Gr H	Croatia	1–1	Italy	Split, Croatia
	Mandžukić 11' (yellow card) 35'; Olić (yellow card) 43'; Srna (yellow card) 54' (yellow card) 90' (red card); Rebić (yellow card) 82'; Kovačić (yellow card) 87'	Report	Buffon (yellow card) 11'; Candreva 36' (pen.); Parolo (yellow card) 53'; Marchisio (yellow card) 71'	Stadium: Stadion Poljud; Attendance: 0 Referee: Martin Atkinson (England); Assistant referees: Michael Mullarkey (England); Stephen Child (England); Fourth official: Simon Beck (England); Goal-line assistants: Anthony Taylor (England); Kevin Friend (England)

3 September 2015 Euro 2016 qualif, Gr H	Azerbaijan	0–0	Croatia	Baku, Azerbaijan
	Qurbanov (yellow card) 79'; Aghayev (yellow card) 82'; Garayev (yellow card) 90+3'	Report	Vida (yellow card) 44'; Rakitić (yellow card) 77'; Kovačić (yellow card) 90+1'	Stadium: Bakcell Arena; Attendance: 10,000; Referee: Ruddy Buquet (France); Assistant referees: Guillaume Debart (France); Cyril Gringore (France); Fourth official: Philippe Jeanne (France); Goal-line assistants: Fredy Fautrel (France); Amaury Delerue (France)

6 September 2015 Euro 2016 qualif, Gr H	Norway	2–0	Croatia	Oslo, Norway
	Forren (yellow card) 38'; Berget 51'; Søderlund (yellow card) 59'; Ćorluka 69' (o.g.); Høgli (yellow card) 75'	Report	Vrsaljko (yellow card) 36'; Brozović (yellow card) 50'; Olić (yellow card) 72'	Stadium: Ullevaal Stadion; Attendance: 26,751; Referee: Viktor Kassai (Hungary); Assistant referees: Vencel Tóth (Hungary); György Ring (Hungary); Fourth official: Zsolt Varga (Hungary); Goal-line assistants: Tamás Bognár (Hungary); Ádám Farkas (Hungary)

10 October 2015 Euro 2016 qualif, Gr H	Croatia	3–0	Bulgaria	Zagreb, Croatia
	Perišić 2' (yellow card) 87'; Rakitić 42'; N. Kalinić 81'; Čop (red card) 89'	Report		Stadium: Stadion Maksimir; Attendance: 0 Referee: Artur Soares Dias (Portugal); Assistant referees: Rui Tavares (Portugal); Álvaro Mesquita (Portugal); Fourth official: Nuno Pereira (Portugal); Goal-line assistants: Hugo Miguel (Portugal); Cosme Machado (Portugal)

13 October 2015 Euro 2016 qualif, Gr H	Malta	0–1	Croatia	Attard, Malta
	Failla (yellow card) 69'	Report	Perišić 25' (yellow card) 90+2'; Badelj (yellow card) 39'	Stadium: Ta' Qali; Attendance: 5,825; Referee: Mark Clattenburg (England); Assistant referees: Stephen Child (England); Michael Salisbury (England); Fourth official: Michael Mullarkey (England); Goal-line assistants: Craig Pawson (England); Lee Mason (England)

17 November 2015 Friendly	Russia	1–3	Croatia	Rostov-on-Don, Russia
	Smolov 15'	Report	Perišić (yellow card) 29'; Vida (yellow card) 37'; N. Kalinić 57'; Brozović 60'; Mandžukić 82'	Stadium: Olimp-2; Attendance: 15,800; Referee: Clément Turpin (France); Assistant referees: Frédéric Cano (France); Nicolas Danos (France)

=== 2016 ===
23 March 2016 Friendly	Croatia	2–0	Israel	Osijek, Croatia
	Perišić 4'; Brozović 34'	Report	Gershon (yellow card) 40'; Kahat (yellow card) 60'; Cohen (yellow card) 61'	Stadium: Stadion Gradski vrt Attendance: 10,545; Referee: István Vad (Hungary); Assistant referees: Gábor Erős (Hungary); Péter Berettyán (Hungary)

26 March 2016 Friendly	Hungary	1–1	Croatia	Budapest, Hungary
	Dzsudzsák 79'; Szalai (yellow card) 80'; Korhut (yellow card) 89'	Report	Mandžukić 29'; Ćorluka (yellow card) 45+2'; Vida (yellow card) 49'; Perišić (yellow card) 63'	Stadium: Groupama Arena; Attendance: 20,300; Referee: Radek Příhoda (Czech Republic); Assistant referees: Radek Kotík (Czech Republic); Ivo Nádvorník (Czech Republic)

27 May 2016 Friendly	Croatia	1–0	Moldova	Koprivnica, Croatia
	Kramarić 9'; Vrsaljko (yellow card) 65'	Report	Cojocari (yellow card) 65'; Golovatenco (yellow card) 67'	Stadium: Gradski stadion Attendance: 3,974; Referee: Ognjen Valjić (Bosnia and Herzegovina); Assistant referees: Senad Ibrišimbegović (Bosnia and Herzegovina); Davor Beljo (Bosnia and Herzegovina)

4 June 2016 Friendly	Croatia	10–0	San Marino	Rijeka, Croatia
	Pjaca 20'; Mandžukić 23', 36', 38'; Srna 24'; Perišić 40'; Rakitić 50'; N. Kalinić 59', 73', 84'	Report	Barretti (yellow card) 47'; Gasperoni (yellow card) 49'	Stadium: Stadion Rujevica; Attendance: 3,603; Referee: Mitja Žganec (Slovenia); Assistant referees: Andraž Kovačič (Slovenia); Tomaž Klančnik (Slovenia)

12 June 2016 Euro 2016, Gr D	Turkey	0–1	Croatia	Paris, France
	Tosun (yellow card) 31'; Balta (yellow card) 48'; Şen (yellow card) 90+1'	Report	Modrić 41'; Strinić (yellow card) 80'	Stadium: Parc des Princes; Attendance: 43,842; Referee: Jonas Eriksson (Sweden); Assistant referees: Mathias Klasenius (Sweden); Daniel Wärnmark (Sweden); Fourth official: Willie Collum (Scotland); Goal-line assistants: Stefan Johannesson (Sweden); Markus Strömbergsson (Sweden)

17 June 2016 Euro 2016, Gr D	Czech Republic	2–2	Croatia	Saint-Étienne, France
	Sivok (yellow card) 72'; Škoda 76'; Necid 89' (pen.)	Report	Badelj (yellow card) 14'; Perišić 37'; Rakitić 59'; Brozović (yellow card) 74'; Vida (yellow card) 88'	Stadium: Stade Geoffroy-Guichard; Attendance: 38,376; Referee: Mark Clattenburg (England); Assistant referees: Jake Collin (England); Simon Beck (England); Fourth official: Anastasios Sidiropoulos (Greece); Goal-line assistants: Anthony Taylor (England); Andre Marriner (England)

21 June 2016 Euro 2016, Gr D	Croatia	2–1	Spain	Bordeaux, France
	Rog (yellow card) 29'; N. Kalinić 45'; Srna (yellow card) 70'; Vrsaljko (yellow card) 70'; Perišić 87' (yellow card) 88'	Report	Morata 7'	Stadium: Nouveau Stade de Bordeaux; Attendance: 37,245; Referee: Björn Kuipers (Netherlands); Assistant referees: Sander van Roekel (Netherlands); Erwin Zeinstra (Netherlands); Fourth official: Viktor Kassai (Hungary); Goal-line assistants: Pol van Boekel (Netherlands); Richard Liesveld (Netherlands)

25 June 2016 Euro 2016, Round of 16	Croatia	0–1 (a.e.t.)	Portugal	Lens, France
		Report	Carvalho (yellow card) 78'; Quaresma 117'	Stadium: Stade Bollaert-Delelis; Attendance: 33,523; Referee: Carlos Velasco Carballo (Spain); Assistant referees: Roberto Alonso (Spain); Juan Carlos Yuste Jiménez (Spain); Fourth official: Viktor Kassai (Hungary); Goal-line assistants: Jesús Gil Manzanol (Spain); Carlos del Cerro Grande (Spain)

5 September 2016 2018 World Cup qualif, Gr I	Croatia	1–1	Turkey	Zagreb, Croatia
	Rakitić 44' (pen.)	Report	Çalhanoğlu 45+2'; Tufan (yellow card) 90+1'; Şahan (yellow card) 90+3'	Stadium: Stadion Maksimir; Attendance: 0 Referee: Szymon Marciniak (Poland); Assistant referees: Tomasz Listkiewicz (Poland); Paweł Sokolnicki (Poland); Fourth official: Paweł Raczkowski (Poland)

6 October 2016 2018 World Cup qualif, Gr I	Kosovo	0–6	Croatia	Shkodër, Albania
	Berisha (yellow card) 18'	Report	Mandžukić 6', 24', 35'; Mitrović 68'; Perišić 83'; N. Kalinić 90+2'	Stadium: Loro Boriçi Stadium; Attendance: 14,612; Referee: David Fernández Borbalán (Spain); Assistant referees: Roberto Alonso (Spain); Raúl Cabañero (Spain); Fourth official: Carlos Clos Gómez (Spain)

9 October 2016 2018 World Cup qualif, Gr I	Finland	0–1	Croatia	Tampere, Finland
	Ring (yellow card) 54'; Moisander (yellow card) 72'	Report	Mandžukić 18'; Vrsaljko (yellow card) 77'	Stadium: Tampere Stadium; Attendance: 15,567; Referee: Ruddy Buquet (France); Assistant referees: Frédéric Cano (France); Guillaume Debart (France); Fourth official: Clément Turpin (France)

12 November 2016 2018 World Cup qualif, Gr I	Croatia	2–0	Iceland	Zagreb, Croatia
	Brozović 15', 90+1'; Badelj (yellow card) 39'; Vida (yellow card) 76'; Perišić (red card) 90+4'	Report	T. Bjarnason (yellow card) 19'	Stadium: Stadion Maksimir; Attendance: 0 Referee: Gianluca Rocchi (Italy); Assistant referees: Mauro Tonolini (Italy); Filippo Meli (Italy); Fourth official: Paolo Mazzoleni (Italy)

15 November 2016 Friendly	Northern Ireland	0–3	Croatia	Belfast, Northern Ireland
		Report	Mandžukić 9'; Čop 35'; Kramarić 67'	Stadium: Windsor Park; Attendance: 16,893; Referee: Mark Clattenburg (England); Assistant referees: Jake Collin (England); Simon Bennett (England)

=== 2017 ===
11 January 2017 2017 China Cup	Chile	1–1 (4–1 p)	Croatia	Nanning, China
	Pinares 18'	Report	Ozobić (yellow card) 53'; Filipović (yellow card) 59'; Andrijašević 76'	Stadium: Guangxi Sports Center; Attendance: 6,686; Referee: Fu Ming (China); Assistant referees: Ma Ji (China); Cao Yi (China)
	Penalties
	Vargas (penalty scored); Galdames (penalty scored); Beausejour (penalty scored); Ramos (penalty scored)		(penalty scored) Pivarić; (penalty missed) Antolić; (penalty missed) Marić

14 January 2017 2017 China Cup	China	1–1 (4–3 p)	Croatia	Nanning, China
	Hui Jiakang (yellow card) 44'; Wang Jingbin 89'	Report	Ivanušec 36'; Tudor (yellow card) 48'; Antolić (yellow card) 53'	Stadium: Guangxi Sports Center; Attendance: 25,576; Referee: Ko Hyung-jin (South Korea); Assistant referees: Yeol Yoon Kwang (South Korea); Ha Kim Young (South Korea)
	Penalties
	Yin Hongbo (penalty scored); Chi Zhongguo (penalty scored); Fan Xiaodong (penalty missed); Wang Jingbin (penalty scored); Wang Jinxian (penalty scored)		(penalty scored) Pivarić; (penalty scored) Ozobić; (penalty missed) Perošević; (penalty scored) Juranović; (penalty missed) Mišić

24 March 2017 2018 World Cup qualif, Gr I	Croatia	1–0	Ukraine	Zagreb, Croatia
	N. Kalinić 38'	Report	Rotan (yellow card) 37'	Stadium: Stadion Maksimir; Attendance: 27,351; Referee: Antonio Mateu Lahoz (Spain); Assistant referees: Pau Cebrián Devís (Spain); Javier Aguilar Rodríguez (Spain); Fourth official: Carlos Clos Gómez (Spain)

28 March 2017 Friendly	Estonia	3–0	Croatia	Tallinn, Estonia
	Luts 1'; Baranov (yellow card) 45'; Vassiljev 81'; Zenjov 84'	Report	Lešković (yellow card) 67'	Stadium: A. Le Coq Arena; Attendance: 4,987; Referee: Mark Clattenburg (England); Assistant referees: Jake Collin (England); Simon Bennett (England)

28 May 2017 Friendly	Mexico	1–2	Croatia	Los Angeles, United States
	Reyes (yellow card) 10'; Hernández 87'	Report	Čop 36' (yellow card) 90+2'; Tudor 37'; Škorić (yellow card) 64' (yellow card) 77' (red card); Barišić (yellow card) 86'	Stadium: Memorial Coliseum; Attendance: 62,317; Referee: Baldomero Toledo (United States); Assistant referees: Jeffrey Hosking (United States); Eduardo Mariscal (United States)

11 June 2017 2018 World Cup qualif, Gr I	Iceland	1–0	Croatia	Reykjavík, Iceland
	Magnússon 90'	Report		Stadium: Laugardalsvöllur; Attendance: 9,775; Referee: Alberto Undiano Mallenco (Spain); Assistant referees: Roberto Alonso (Spain); Javier Aguilar Rodríguez (Spain); Fourth official: Carlos Clos Gómez (Spain)

3 September 2017 2018 World Cup qualif, Gr I	Croatia	1–0	Kosovo	Zagreb, Croatia
	Vida 74'; Pivarić (yellow card) 90'	Report	Muriqi (yellow card) 65'; Vojvoda (yellow card) 83'	Stadium: Stadion Maksimir; Attendance: 6,838; Referee: Stefan Johannesson (Sweden); Assistant referees: Fredrik Nilsson (Sweden); Mehmet Culum (Sweden); Fourth official: Mohammed Al-Hakim (Sweden)

5 September 2017 2018 World Cup qualif, Gr I	Turkey	1–0	Croatia	Eskişehir, Turkey
	Tosun (yellow card) 9' (goal) 75'; Çalhanoğlu (yellow card) 39'	Report	N. Kalinić (yellow card) 45'; Perišić (yellow card) 65'; Badelj (yellow card) 90+2'; Brozović (yellow card) 90+4'	Stadium: Eskişehir Stadium; Attendance: 28,600; Referee: Viktor Kassai (Hungary); Assistant referees: Vencel Tóth (Hungary); György Ring (Hungary); Fourth official: Ádám Farkas (Hungary)

6 October 2017 2018 World Cup qualif, Gr I	Croatia	1–1	Finland	Rijeka, Croatia
	Mandžukić 57'; Rog (yellow card) 89'	Report	Hetemaj (yellow card) 75'; Soiri 90'	Stadium: Stadion Rujevica; Attendance: 7,578; Referee: Daniel Stefański (Poland); Assistant referees: Krzysztof Myrmus (Poland); Dawid Golis (Poland); Fourth official: Bartosz Frankowski (Poland)

9 October 2017 2018 World Cup qualif, Gr I	Ukraine	0–2	Croatia	Kyiv, Ukraine
	Stepanenko (yellow card) 60'; Rotan (yellow card) 64'	Report	Kramarić 62', 70'	Stadium: Olimpiyskiy National Sports Complex; Attendance: 60,200; Referee: Felix Brych (Germany); Assistant referees: Mark Borsch (Germany); Stefan Lupp (Germany); Fourth official: Bastian Dankert (Germany)

9 November 2017 2018 World Cup qualif, play-off	Croatia	4–1	Greece	Zagreb, Croatia
	Modrić 13' (pen.); N. Kalinić 19'; Perišić 33'; Kramarić 49'	Report	Karnezis (yellow card) 12'; Zeca (yellow card) 21'; Papastathopoulos 30'; Bakasetas (yellow card) 79'	Stadium: Stadion Maksimir; Attendance: 30,013; Referee: Gianluca Rocchi (Italy); Assistant referees: Mauro Tonolini (Italy); Elenito Di Liberatore (Italy); Fourth official: Luca Banti (Italy)

12 November 2017 2018 World Cup qualif, play-off	Greece	0–0 (1–4 agg.)	Croatia	Piraeus, Greece
	Tachtsidis (yellow card) 24'	Report		Stadium: Karaiskakis Stadium; Attendance: 18,667; Referee: Björn Kuipers (Netherlands); Assistant referees: Sander van Roekel (Netherlands); Erwin Zeinstra (Netherlands); Fourth official: Danny Makkelie (Netherlands)

=== 2018 ===
24 March 2018 Friendly	Peru	2–0	Croatia	Miami, United States
	Carrillo 12'; Cueva (yellow card) 27'; Flores 48'; Yotún (yellow card) 56' (yellow card) 74' (red card)	Report	Brozović (yellow card) 29'; Vrsaljko (yellow card) 77'	Stadium: Hard Rock Stadium; Attendance: 46,893; Referee: Ismail Elfath (United States); Assistant referees: Charles Justin Morgante (United States); Adam Wienckowski (United States)

28 March 2018 Friendly	Mexico	0–1	Croatia	Arlington, United States
		Report	Rakitić 62' (pen.)	Stadium: AT&T Stadium; Attendance: 79,128; Referee: Mario Escobar (Guatemala); Assistant referees: Ronaldo de la Cruz (Guatemala); Kyle Atkins (United States)

3 June 2018 Friendly	Brazil	2–0	Croatia	Liverpool, England
	Fernandinho (yellow card) 40'; Neymar 69'; Firmino 90+3'	Report	Kramarić (yellow card) 13'; Perišić (yellow card) 38'; Rakitić (yellow card) 79'	Stadium: Anfield; Attendance: 36,584; Referee: Michael Oliver (England); Assistant referees: Simon Bennett (England); Stuart Burt (England)

8 June 2018 Friendly	Croatia	2–1	Senegal	Osijek, Croatia
	Perišić 63'; Kramarić 78'; Kovačić (yellow card) 86'	Report	Koulibaly (yellow card) 35'; Sarr 48'; Sakho (yellow card) 61'; N'Diaye (yellow card) 66'; Sané (yellow card) 67'; Mané (yellow card) 67'	Stadium: Stadion Gradski vrt Attendance: 15,998; Referee: Ádám Farkas (Hungary); Assistant referees: Balázs Buzás (Hungary); Balázs Szert (Hungary)

16 June 2018 2018 World Cup, Gr D	Croatia	2–0	Nigeria	Kaliningrad, Russia
	Rakitić (yellow card) 30'; Etebo 32' (o.g.); Modrić 71' (pen.); Brozović (yellow card) 89'	Report	Ekong (yellow card) 90'	Stadium: Kaliningrad Stadium; Attendance: 31,136; Referee: Sandro Ricci (Brazil); Assistant referees: Emerson de Carvalho (Brazil); Marcelo Van Gasse (Brazil); Fourth official: Antonio Mateu Lahoz (Spain); Man of the Match: Luka Modrić

21 June 2018 2018 World Cup, Gr D	Argentina	0–3	Croatia	Nizhny Novgorod, Russia
	Mercado (yellow card) 51'; Otamendi (yellow card) 85'; Acuña (yellow card) 87'	Report	Rebić (yellow card) 39' (goal) 53'; Mandžukić (yellow card) 58'; Vrsaljko (yellow card) 67'; Modrić 80'; Rakitić 90+1'; Ćorluka (yellow card) 90+4'	Stadium: Nizhny Novgorod Stadium; Attendance: 43,319; Referee: Ravshan Irmatov (Uzbekistan); Assistant referees: Abdukhamidullo Rasulov (Uzbekistan); Jakhongir Saidov (Uzbekistan); Fourth official: Norbert Hauata (Tahiti); Man of the Match: Luka Modrić

26 June 2018 2018 World Cup, Gr D	Iceland	1–2	Croatia	Rostov-on-Don, Russia
	Hallfreðsson (yellow card) 59'; Finnbogason (yellow card) 64'; G. Sigurðsson 76' (pen.); Sævarsson (yellow card) 84'	Report	Pjaca (yellow card) 14'; Badelj 53'; Jedvaj (yellow card) 83'; Perišić 90'	Stadium: Rostov Arena; Attendance: 43,472; Referee: Antonio Mateu Lahoz (Spain); Assistant referees: Roberto Díaz (Spain); Pau Cebrián Devís (Spain); Fourth official: John Pitti (Panama); Man of the Match: Milan Badelj

1 July 2018 2018 World Cup, Round of 16	Croatia	1–1 (a.e.t.) (3–2 p)	Denmark	Nizhny Novgorod, Russia
	Mandžukić 4'; Modrić (penalty missed) 116'	Report	M. Jørgensen 1' (yellow card) 115'	Stadium: Nizhny Novgorod Stadium; Attendance: 40,851; Referee: Néstor Pitana (Argentina); Assistant referees: Hernán Maidana (Argentina); Juan Pablo Bellati (Argentina); Fourth official: Enrique Cáceres (Paraguay); Man of the Match: Kasper Schmeichel
	Penalties
	Badelj (penalty missed); Kramarić (penalty scored); Modrić (penalty scored); Pivarić (penalty missed); Rakitić (penalty scored)		(penalty missed) Eriksen; (penalty scored) Kjær; (penalty scored) Krohn-Dehli; (penalty missed) Schöne; (penalty missed) N. Jørgensen

7 July 2018 2018 World Cup, quarterfinal	Russia	2–2 (a.e.t.) (3–4 p)	Croatia	Sochi, Russia
	Cheryshev 31'; Gazinsky (yellow card) 109'; Fernandes 115'	Report	Lovren (yellow card) 35'; Strinić (yellow card) 38'; Kramarić 39'; Vida 101' (yellow card) 101'; Pivarić (yellow card) 114'	Stadium: Fisht Olympic Stadium; Attendance: 44,287; Referee: Sandro Ricci (Brazil); Assistant referees: Emerson de Carvalho (Brazil); Marcelo Van Gasse (Brazil); Fourth official: Janny Sikazwe (Zambia); Man of the Match: Luka Modrić
	Penalties
	Smolov (penalty missed); Dzagoev (penalty scored); Fernandes (penalty missed); Ignashevich (penalty scored); Kuzyayev (penalty scored)		(penalty scored) Brozović; (penalty missed) Kovačić; (penalty scored) Modrić; (penalty scored) Vida; (penalty scored) Rakitić

11 July 2018 2018 World Cup, semifinal	Croatia	2–1 (a.e.t.)	England	Moscow, Russia
	Mandžukić (yellow card) 48' (goal) 109'; Perišić 68'; Rebić (yellow card) 96'	Report	Trippier 5'; Walker (yellow card) 54'	Stadium: Luzhniki Stadium; Attendance: 78,011; Referee: Cüneyt Çakır (Turkey); Assistant referees: Bahattin Duran (Turkey); Tarık Ongun (Turkey); Fourth official: Björn Kuipers (Netherlands); Man of the Match: Ivan Perišić

15 July 2018 2018 World Cup, Final	France	4–2	Croatia	Moscow, Russia
	Mandžukić 18' (o.g.); Kanté (yellow card) 27'; Griezmann 38' (pen.); Hernandez (yellow card) 41'; Pogba 59'; Mbappé 65'	Report	Perišić 28'; Mandžukić 69'; Vrsaljko (yellow card) 90+2'	Stadium: Luzhniki Stadium; Attendance: 78,011; Referee: Néstor Pitana (Argentina); Assistant referees: Hernán Maidana (Argentina); Juan Pablo Bellati (Argentina); Fourth official: Björn Kuipers (Netherlands); Man of the Match: Antoine Griezmann

6 September 2018 Friendly	Portugal	1–1	Croatia	Faro/Loulé, Portugal
	Pepe 32'; Carvalho (yellow card) 72'	Report	Perišić 18' (yellow card) 30'; Kovačić (yellow card) 42'	Stadium: Estádio Algarve; Attendance: 26,355; Referee: Xavier Estrada Fernández (Spain); Assistant referees: Javier Aguilar Rodríguez (Spain); Teodoro Sobrino Magán (Spain)

11 September 2018 2018–19 Nations Lg, Gr A4	Spain	6–0	Croatia	Elche, Spain
20:45 (20:45 UTC+2)	Ñíguez 24'; Asensio 33'; L. Kalinić 35' (o.g.); Rodrigo 49'; Ramos 57'; Isco 70'	Report	Santini (yellow card) 12'; Brozović (yellow card) 39'	Stadium: Estadio Manuel Martínez Valero; Attendance: 26,900; Referee: Benoît Bastien (France); Assistant referees: Hicham Zakrani (France); Frédéric Haquette (France); Fourth official: Philippe Jeanne (France); Goal-line assistants: Benoît Millot (France); Jérôme Miguelgorry (France)

12 October 2018 2018–19 Nations Lg, Gr A4	Croatia	0–0	England	Rijeka, Croatia
20:45 (20:45 UTC+2)	Kovačić (yellow card) 25'; Lovren (yellow card) 45'; Jedvaj (yellow card) 59'	Report	Henderson (yellow card) 6'; Stones (yellow card) 52'; Sterling (yellow card) 72'	Stadium: Stadion Rujevica; Attendance: 0 Referee: Felix Brych (Germany); Assistant referees: Mark Borsch (Germany); Stefan Lupp (Germany); Fourth official: Dominik Schaal (Germany); Goal-line assistants: Marco Fritz (Germany); Harm Osmers (Germany)

15 October 2018 Friendly	Croatia	2–1	Jordan	Rijeka, Croatia
	Vida 24'; Bartolec (yellow card) 45'; Mitrović 63'; Jedvaj (yellow card) 79'; Rog (yellow card) 90+1'	Report	Al-Mardi (yellow card) 41'; Faisal 73'; Khattab (yellow card) 85'	Stadium: Stadion Rujevica; Attendance: 4,820; Referee: Andó-Szabó Sándor (Hungary); Assistant referees: Zsolt Varga (Hungary); Oszkár Lémon (Hungary); Fourth official: Fran Jović (Croatia)

15 November 2018 2018–19 Nations Lg, Gr A4	Croatia	3–2	Spain	Zagreb, Croatia
20:45 (20:45 UTC+1)	Kramarić 54'; Jedvaj 69' 90+3'; Rebić (yellow card) 70'; Perišić (yellow card) 88'	Report	Ceballos 56'; Ramos 77' (pen.); Busquets (yellow card) 87'; Ceballos (yellow card) 90'	Stadium: Stadion Maksimir; Attendance: 33,018; Referee: Aleksei Kulbakov (Belarus); Assistant referees: Dmitri Zhuk (Belarus); Oleg Maslyanko (Belarus); Fourth official: Yury Khomchenko (Belarus); Goal-line assistants: Denis Scherbakov (Belarus); Dzmitry Dzmitryieu (Belarus)

18 November 2018 2018–19 Nations Lg, Gr A4	England	2–1	Croatia	London, England
15:00 (14:00 UTC±0)	Barkley (yellow card) 26'; Lingard 78'; Kane 85'	Report	Kramarić 57'; Brozovic (yellow card) 67'; Jedvaj (yellow card) 67'; Lovren (yellow card) 89'	Stadium: Wembley Stadium; Attendance: 78,221; Referee: Anastasios Sidiropoulos (Greece); Assistant referees: Polychronis Kostaras (Greece); Lazaros Dimitriadis (Greece); Fourth official: Damianos Efthimiadis (Greece); Goal-line assistants: Anastasios Papapetrou (Greece); Ioannis Papadopoulos (Greece)

=== 2019 ===
21 March 2019 Euro 2020 qualif, Gr E	Croatia	2–1	Azerbaijan	Zagreb, Croatia
20:45	Barišić 44'; Kramarić 79'	Report	Sheydayev 19'; Medvedev (yellow card) 67'	Stadium: Stadion Maksimir; Attendance: 23,146; Referee: Georgi Kabakov (Bulgaria); Assistant referees: Martin Margaritov (Bulgaria); Diyan Valkov (Bulgaria); Fourth official: Nikola Popov (Bulgaria)

24 March 2019 Euro 2020 qualif, Gr E	Hungary	2–1	Croatia	Budapest, Hungary
18:00	Szalai 34'; Dzsudzsák (yellow card) 63'; Pátkai 76'	Report	Rebić 13'; Lovren (yellow card) 82'	Stadium: Groupama Arena; Attendance: 22,000; Referee: Willie Collum (Scotland); Assistant referees: David McGeachie (Scotland); Graeme Stewart (Scotland); Fourth official: Bobby Madden (Scotland)

8 June 2019 Euro 2020 qualif, Gr E	Croatia	2–1	Wales	Osijek, Croatia
15:00	J. Lawrence 17' (o.g.); Brekalo (yellow card) 28'; Perišić 48'; Jedvaj (yellow card) 50'; Lovren (yellow card) 54'; Vida (yellow card) 69'; Brozović (yellow card) 90+2'	Report	Bale (yellow card) 49'; Brooks 77'	Stadium: Gradski vrt Attendance: 17,061; Referee: István Kovács (Romania); Assistant referees: Vasile Marinescu (Romania); Ovidiu Artene (Romania); Fourth official: Marius Avram (Romania)

11 June 2019 Friendly	Croatia	1–2	Tunisia	Varaždin, Croatia
20:45	Petković 47'; Vida (yellow card) 69'	Report	Badri 16'; Sliti 70' (pen.); Kechrida (yellow card) 89'	Stadium: Stadion Varteks; Attendance: 8,036; Referee: Daniel Stefański (Poland); Assistant referees: Konrad Sapela (Poland); Dawid Igor Golis (Poland); Fourth official: Igor Pajač (Croatia)

6 September 2019 Euro 2020 qualif, Gr E	Slovakia	0–4	Croatia	Trnava, Slovakia
20:45		Report	Vlašić 45'; Perišić 47'; Petković 72'; Lovren 89'	Stadium: Štadión Antona Malatinského; Attendance: 18,098; Referee: Felix Brych (Germany); Assistant referees: Mark Borsch (Germany); Stefan Lupp (Germany); Fourth official: Marco Fritz (Germany)

9 September 2019 Euro 2020 qualif, Gr E	Azerbaijan	1–1	Croatia	Baku, Azerbaijan
20:00	Krivotsyuk (yellow card) 62'; Nazarov (yellow card) 67'; Khalilzade (yellow card) 68' (goal) 72'; Medvedev (yellow card) 90+3'	Report	Modrić 11' (pen.); Brozović (yellow card) 21'; Barišić (yellow card) 70'	Stadium: Bakcell Arena; Attendance: 9,150; Referee: Sandro Schärer (Switzerland); Assistant referees: Stephane De Almeida (Switzerland); Alain Heiniger (Switzerland); Fourth official: Fedayi San (Switzerland)

10 October 2019 Euro 2020 qualif, Gr E	Croatia	3–0	Hungary	Split, Croatia
20:45	Modrić 5'; Petković 24', 42'; Vida (yellow card) 31'; Brozović (yellow card) 45'	Report	Kleinheisler (yellow card) 18' (yellow-red card) 56'; Lovrencsics (yellow card) 82'	Stadium: Stadion Poljud; Attendance: 32,110; Referee: Daniele Orsato (Italy); Assistant referees: Lorenzo Manganelli (Italy); Fabiano Preti (Italy); Fourth official: Davide Massa (Italy)

13 October 2019 Euro 2020 qualif, Gr E	Wales	1–1	Croatia	Cardiff, Wales
19:45	Bale 45+3'; Moore (yellow card) 57'; Allen (yellow card) 86'; James (yellow card) 90+6'	Report	Vlašić 9'; Vida (yellow card) 15'; Lovren (yellow card) 45+5'; Petković (yellow card) 46'; Rakitić (yellow card) 85'; Modrić (yellow card) 89'	Stadium: Cardiff City Stadium; Attendance: 31,745; Referee: Björn Kuipers (Netherlands); Assistant referees: Sander van Roekel (Netherlands); Erwin Zeinstra (Netherlands); Fourth official: Pol van Boekel (Netherlands)

16 November 2019 Euro 2020 qualif, Gr E	Croatia	3–1	Slovakia	Rijeka, Croatia
20:45	Ćaleta-Car (yellow card) 13'; Rebić (yellow card) 43'; Vlašić 56'; Petković 60'; Perišić 74'	Report	Mak (yellow card) 23' (yellow-red card) 66'; Boženík 32'; Dúbravka (yellow card) 79'	Stadium: Stadion Rujevica; Attendance: 8,212; Referee: Clément Turpin (France); Assistant referees: Nicolas Danos (France); Cyril Gringore (France); Fourth official: François Letexier (France)

19 November 2019 Friendly	Croatia	2–1	Georgia	Pula, Croatia
20:45	Kashia 25' (o.g.); Perišić 54'	Report	Papunashvili 19'	Stadium: Stadion Aldo Drosina; Attendance: 5,072; Referee: Alan Mario Sant (Malta); Assistant referees: Duncan Sultana (Malta); Luke Portelli (Malta); Fourth official: Marin Vidulin (Croatia)

== Record per opponent ==
More wins than losses
As many wins as losses
Fewer wins than losses

Opponent	Pld	W	D	L	GF	GA	GD	Win %
Argentina	2	1	0	1	4	2	+2	50.00
Australia	1	1	0	0	1	0	+1	100.00
Austria	1	1	0	0	1	0	+1	100.00
Azerbaijan	4	2	2	0	9	2	+7	50.00
Belgium	2	0	1	1	2	2	+0	0.00
Brazil	2	0	0	2	1	5	−4	0.00
Bulgaria	2	2	0	0	4	0	+4	100.00
Cameroon	1	1	0	0	4	0	+4	100.00
Chile	1	0	1	0	1	1	+0	0.00
China	1	0	1	0	1	1	+0	0.00
Cyprus	1	1	0	0	2	0	+2	100.00
Czech Republic	2	1	1	0	6	4	+2	50.00
Denmark	1	0	1	0	1	1	+0	0.00
England	3	1	1	1	3	3	+0	33.33
Estonia	3	1	1	1	3	4	−1	33.33
Finland	2	1	1	0	2	1	+1	50.00
France	2	0	1	1	2	4	−2	0.00
Georgia	3	2	0	1	4	3	+1	66.67
Greece	4	1	2	1	4	3	+1	25.00
Hungary	3	1	1	1	5	3	+2	33.33
Iceland	5	3	1	1	6	2	+4	60.00
Israel	3	3	0	0	7	2	+5	100.00
Italy	3	0	3	0	3	3	+0	0.00
Jordan	1	1	0	0	2	1	+1	100.00
Kosovo	2	2	0	0	7	0	+7	100.00
Latvia	2	2	0	0	5	0	+5	100.00
Liechtenstein	1	1	0	0	3	2	+1	100.00
Macedonia	2	2	0	0	3	1	+2	100.00
Mali	1	1	0	0	2	1	+1	100.00
Malta	4	4	0	0	9	1	+8	100.00
Mexico	3	2	0	1	4	4	+0	66.67
Moldova	1	1	0	0	1	0	+1	100.00
Nigeria	1	1	0	0	2	0	+2	100.00
Northern Ireland	1	1	0	0	3	0	+3	100.00
Norway	4	2	1	1	8	5	+3	50.00
Peru	1	0	0	1	0	2	−2	0.00
Portugal	3	0	1	2	1	3	−2	0.00
Republic of Ireland	2	1	1	0	3	1	+2	50.00
Russia	2	1	1	0	5	3	+2	50.00
San Marino	1	1	0	0	10	0	+10	100.00
Scotland	2	0	0	2	0	3	−3	0.00
Senegal	1	1	0	0	2	1	+1	100.00
Serbia	2	1	1	0	3	1	+2	50.00
Slovakia	3	2	1	0	8	2	+6	66.67
South Korea	2	2	0	0	6	1	+5	100.00
Spain	4	2	0	2	5	10	−5	50.00
Sweden	1	0	0	1	1	3	−2	0.00
Switzerland	2	0	1	1	4	6	−2	0.00
Tunisia	1	0	0	1	1	2	−1	0.00
Turkey	5	2	2	1	5	2	+3	40.00
Ukraine	2	2	0	0	3	0	+3	100.00
Wales	5	4	1	0	9	3	+6	80.00
Total: 53 teams played	114	62	28	24	191	105	+86	54.39
