= 1990 Yugoslavia v Netherlands football match =

Yugoslavia v Netherlands (1990)
- Event: International friendly
Yugoslavia	Netherlands
0	2
- Date: 3 June 1990
- Venue: Maksimir stadium, Zagreb
- Referee: Friedrich Kaupe (Austria)
- Attendance: 30,000

On 3 June 1990, Yugoslavia hosted the Netherlands in an international friendly at Zagreb's Maksimir stadium. The match was the last preparation friendly (known as the dress rehearsal) for Ivica Osim's Yugoslavia side ahead of the 1990 FIFA World Cup in Italy. However, the contest is mostly remembered for the controversy raised due to the spectator behaviour: throughout the match, a nationalist Croat crowd of 20,000 shouted down the Yugoslav national anthem, insulted Yugoslav team players and jeered the head coach. Play on the pitch quickly became secondary as the match turned into another football-related incident reflecting ethnic tensions and rising nationalism in the Socialist Federal Republic of Yugoslavia.

== Background ==
Although on what would soon turn out to be its last legs, SFR Yugoslavia (multi-ethnic federation made up of six constituent republics) still existed as a state in 1990 while Socialist Republic of Croatia was its second largest constituent republic populated mostly by ethnic Croats with a large ethnic Serb minority.

Ten years after the death of Yugoslav president Josip Broz Tito, Yugoslavia was crippled by rising ethnic tensions. In parallel, in the wake of the fall of the Berlin Wall, the country was transitioning its system of governance from communist one-party system to democratic multi-party system.

SR Croatia's first parliamentary elections took place from 22 April to 7 May 1990 with nationalist right-wing Croatian Democratic Union (HDZ) led by Franjo Tuđman winning in a landslide.

With tensions running high, a football riot took place on 13 May 1990, at Maksimir during a Yugoslav First League match between the Croatian club Dinamo Zagreb and the Serbian club Red Star Belgrade. Croatian midfielder Zvonimir Boban kicked the policeman Refik Ahmetović and as a result got suspended by the Football Association of Yugoslavia (FSJ) for six months, causing him to miss the 1990 FIFA World Cup as well as the pre-tournament preparation friendlies.

== Game ==
The exhibition versus the Netherlands took place on 3 June and was the last exhibition before the 1990 FIFA World Cup. The crowd of 20,000 booed the Yugoslav national anthem "Hey, Slavs". Fans cheered for the Netherlands, heckling the Yugoslav team and its manager Ivica Osim. Many Dutch flags were also seen in the crowd, owing to their similarity to the Croatian tricolour (red, white and blue).

== Aftermath ==
The match was the last of the Yugoslav team to be played in Maksimir. On 17 October of that year, the Croatia national team played its first international match in Maksimir against the United States.

== Match details ==
3 June 1990

Yugoslavia	0–2	Netherlands
	Report	Rijkaard 53'; Van Basten 83'

Stadion Maksimir, Zagreb
Attendance: 30,000
Referee: Friedrich Kaupe (Austria)

Yugoslavia	Netherlands

GK	1	Tomislav Ivković
DF	18	Mirsad Baljić
DF	3	Predrag Spasić
DF	4	Zoran Vulić
DF	5	Faruk Hadžibegić
MF	13	Srečko Katanec	(substituted off) 59'
MF	8	Safet Sušić	(substituted off) 59'
MF	19	Dejan Savićević
MF	6	Davor Jozić
MF	10	Dragan Stojković
FW	11	Zlatko Vujović (c)	(substituted off) 75'
Substitutes:
MF	2	Dragoljub Brnović	(substituted on) 59'
FW	9	Robert Prosinečki	(substituted on) 59'
FW	7	Darko Pančev	(substituted on) 75'
Manager:
(Socialist Federal Republic of Yugoslavia) Ivica Osim

GK	1	Hans van Breukelen
DF	2	Berry van Aerle		(substituted off) 68'
DF	4	Ronald Koeman
DF	13	Graeme Rutjes
DF	5	Adri van Tiggelen	Yellow card
MF	3	Frank Rijkaard
MF	6	Jan Wouters
MF	7	Erwin Koeman		(substituted off) 79'
MF	10	Ruud Gullit (c)
MF	9	Marco van Basten
FW	12	Wim Kieft
Substitutes:
MF	8	Danny Blind		(substituted on) 68'
DF	11	Richard Witschge		(substituted on) 79'
Manager:
(Netherlands) Leo Beenhakker

== See also ==
- Dinamo–Red Star riot
