= Bossy =

Bossy may refer to:

== People ==
- Fabien Bossy (born 1977), French football defender
- George Bossy (1927–2012), Canadian sprint canoeist
- John Bossy (1933–2015), British historian
- Marcos Bossy (1920–1987), Swiss basketball player
- Maurice Bossy (1929–2008), Canadian politician
- Mike Bossy (1957–2022), Canadian ice hockey player
- Raoul Bossy (1895–1975), Romanian diplomat

== Other uses ==
- "Bossy" (Kelis song), 2006
- "Bossy" (Lindsay Lohan song), 2008
- Bossy (Neighbours), a fictional dog from the Australian soap opera Neighbours
- the title character of Little Miss Bossy, a children's book
- A common name for cattle

== See also ==
- Bossey, France, a commune
- Bossey Ecumenical Institute, near Geneva, Switzerland, the ecumenical institute of the World Council of Churches
- Bossi (disambiguation)
- Bossie, Burkina Faso, a town
- David Bossie (born 1965), American political activist
- Robert F. Bossie, American politician, New Hampshire state senator from 1972 to 1977
