= San Michele al Pozzo Bianco =

Coordinates: 45.704084°N 9.669894°E

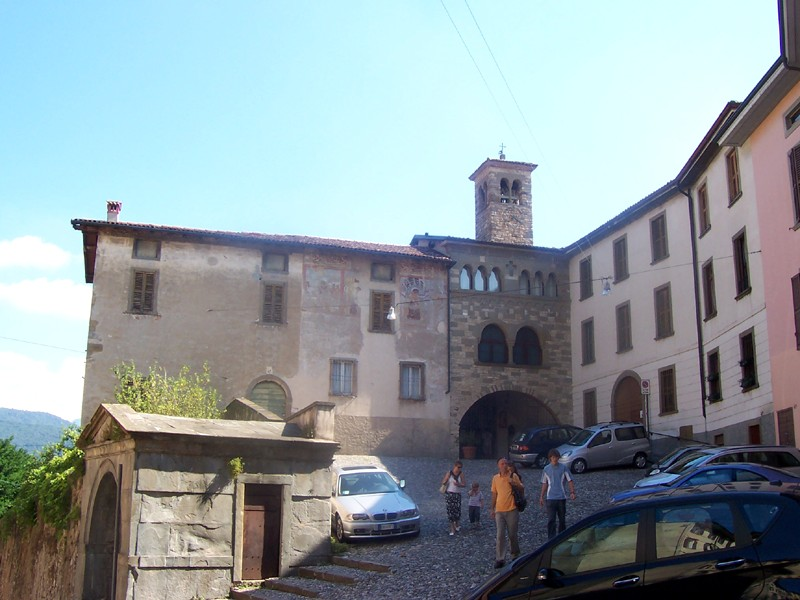

Religion
- Affiliation: Roman Catholic
- Province: Bergamo

Location
- Location: Bergamo, Italy
- Interactive map of San Michele al Pozzo Bianco

Architecture
- Type: Church
- Style: Renaissance

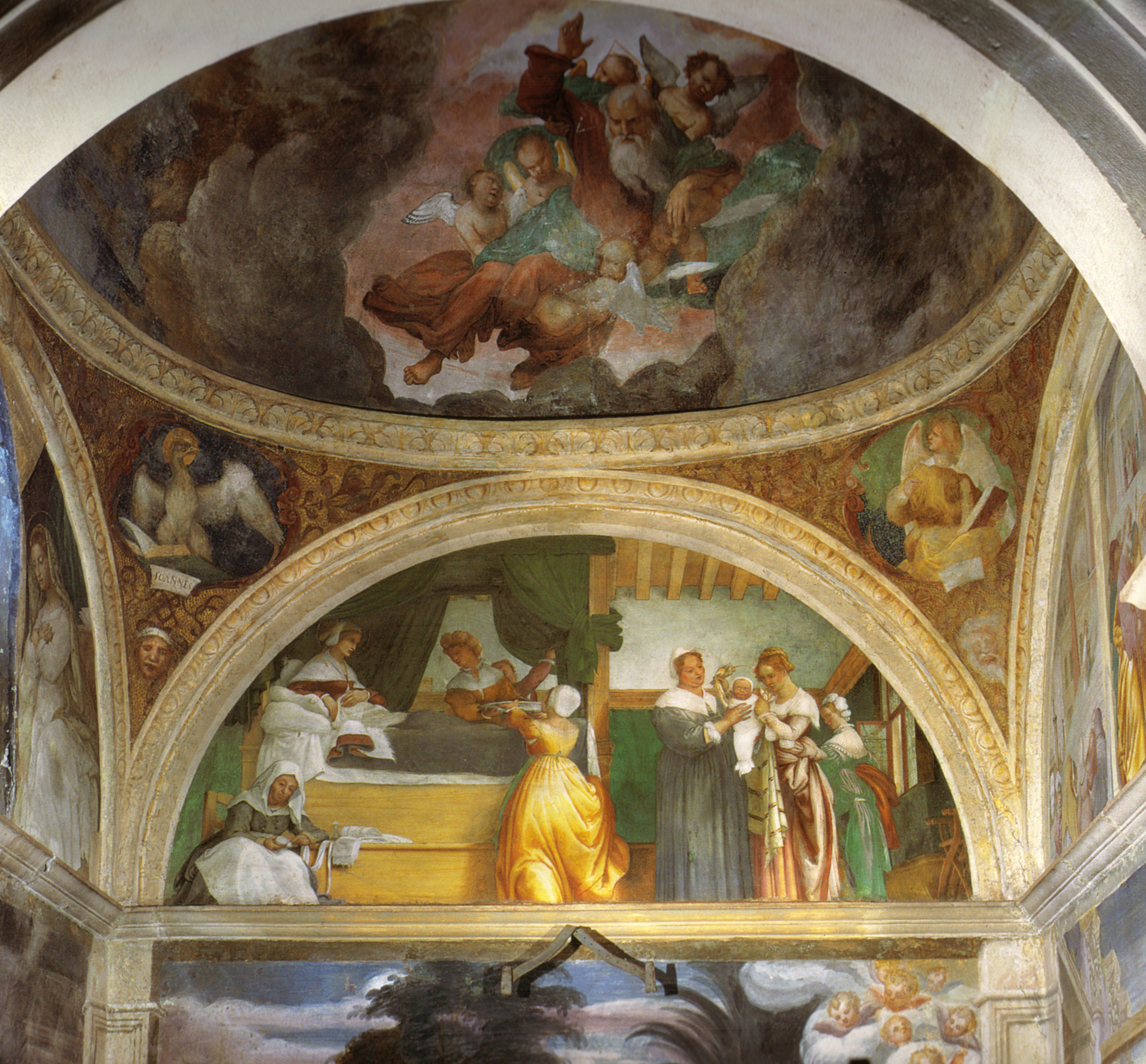
Birth of Mary, fresco by Lorenzo Lotto

San Michele al Pozzo Bianco is a church in the upper town of Bergamo, on a small piazza of the same name, near Porta Sant'Agostino, on Via Porta Dipinta. The church is now in a corner next to the frescoed house of the vicar, entered by a large rounded arch. The vicar's house has an external fresco attributed to Giacomo Scanardi.

== History ==
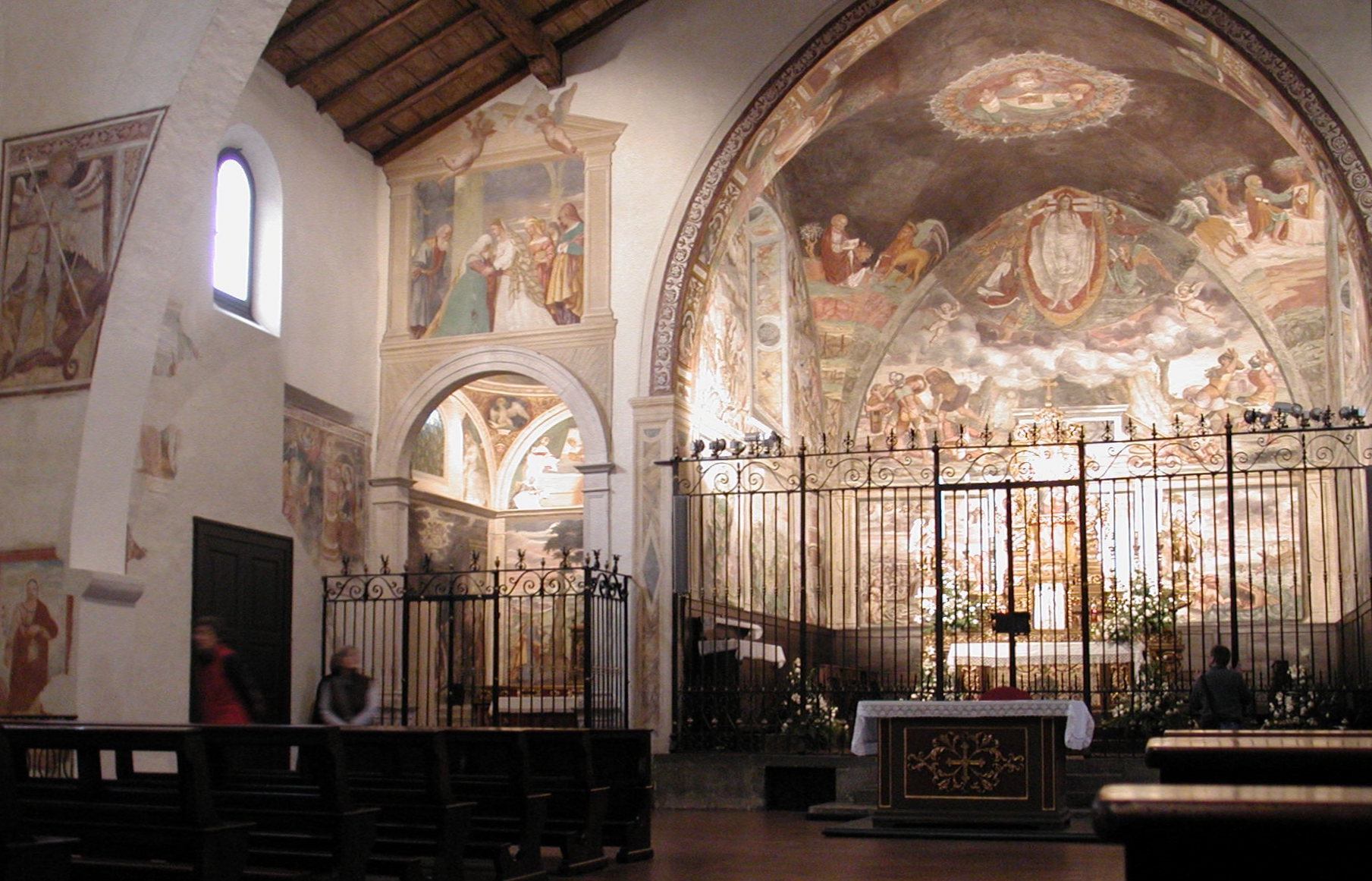
Interior

Founded in the 8th century, it was rebuilt many times over the centuries. The present facade is from the early 20th century. Much of the interior was rebuilt in the 15th century, and covered with frescoes in a style influenced by Byzantine iconography.

== Art ==
The chapel to the left, completed later, has a series of frescoed panels Scenes from the Life of The Virgin Mary (1525), masterworks by Lorenzo Lotto. The central chapel and the one on the right is frescoed (1577) by Giovan Battista Guarinoni d'Averara. The latter chapel has a canvas Madonna and child with Saints Peter and Paul by Giovanni Paolo Lolmo.

On the right wall, there is a Madonna of the Rosary and Saints by Enea Salmeggia and in the counterfacade, two frescoes by Antonio Cifrondi depicting Christ and the adulterous woman and the Last Supper. The crypt has 13th-century frescoes, and one of a Enthroned Madonna and Saints, attributed to Antonio Boselli.

== Bibliography ==
- AA.VV., Lombardia (esclusa Milano), Touring Club Editore, Milano 1999. ISBN 978-88-365-1325-3
