= Second Battle of Bosso (2015) =

- Part of Boko Haram insurgency
Date	March 30, 2015
Location	Bosso, Niger
Result	Nigerien-Chadian victory

Belligerents
Niger; Chad	Islamic State - West Africa Province

Casualties and losses
None	47 killed

On March 30, 2015, militants from the Islamic State – West Africa Province (ISWAP) attacked the Nigerien town of Bosso for the second time since February.

== Background ==
Boko Haram emerged in 2009 as a jihadist social and political movement in a failed rebellion in northeast Nigeria. Throughout the following years, Abubakar Shekau unified militant Islamist groups in the region and continued to foment the rebellion against the Nigerian government, conducting terrorist attacks and bombings in cities and communities across the region.

Boko Haram attacked Niger for the first time on February 6 at Bosso, being repulsed by Nigerien and Chadian troops. Around 400 Boko Haram fighters died in the battle. It attacked Niger again at Karamga two weeks later. On March 7, Boko Haram publicly declared allegiance to the Islamic State and became the Islamic State – West Africa Province. At the same time in March 2015, Nigerien and Chadian forces were on an offensive towards Malam Fatori and had just captured Damasak. The capture and destruction of an ISWAP base at Talagam several days prior is considered to be a provocation of the Bosso attack.

== Battle ==
On March 30, ISWAP fighters from Malam Fatori attempted to launch a raid into Bosso in Niger. However, the fighters were intercepted by Chadian and Nigerien soldiers. The attack was repelled, and heavy aerial bombardment occurred along the Niger-Nigeria border. Survivors of the attack retreated to Malam Fatori. According to the Chadian government, 47 jihadists were killed, and no Nigerian or Chadian casualties were reported. Another source with AFP said that between 40 to 47 jihadists were killed.
