= Giulio Bas =

Italian composer and organist

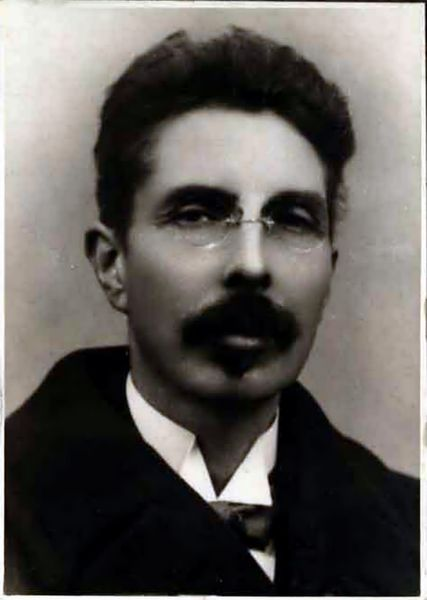
Image of Bas

Giulio Bas (21 April 1874 – 27 August 1929) was an Italian Romantic composer and organist.

== Life ==
Born in Venice, he studied with Giovanni Tebaldini at the Cappella Marciana and with Marco Enrico Bossi at the Liceo Musicale of Venice. He completed his studies with Josef Rheinberger in Munich. From 1901 he was second organist at St. Mark's in Venice and after 1903 organist in Calvi, Teano, and then at San Luigi dei Francesi in Rome. From 1912 till his death he was teacher at the Conservatorio.

He died in Vobbia, near Genoa.

== Compositions ==
=== Organ solo ===
- 16 Preludi-Corali su melodie degli otto toni dei Salmi
- Organ Sonata in F (pub. 1909)

== Theoretical works ==
- Manuale di canto gregoriano (1910)
- Metodo di accompagnamento al canto gregoriano e di composizione negli 8 modi (1920)
- Trattato d'armonia (1922–3)
- Trattato di forme musicali (2 vols, 1920–2)
