= Bosso (surname) =

Bosso is a surname. Notable people with the surname include:

- Adonis Bosso (born 1990), Ivorian-Canadian model
- Ezio Bosso (1971–2020), Italian composer, pianist, double bass player, and conductor
- Hassan Bosso (born 1969), Nigerian sprinter
- Osvaldo Bosso (born 1993), Chilean footballer
- Patrick Bosso (born 1962), French comedian and actor

== See also ==
- Bosso (disambiguation)
- Bossi (surname), Italian surname
