= Life of the Virgin (Lotto) =

1525 fresco by Lorenzo Lotto

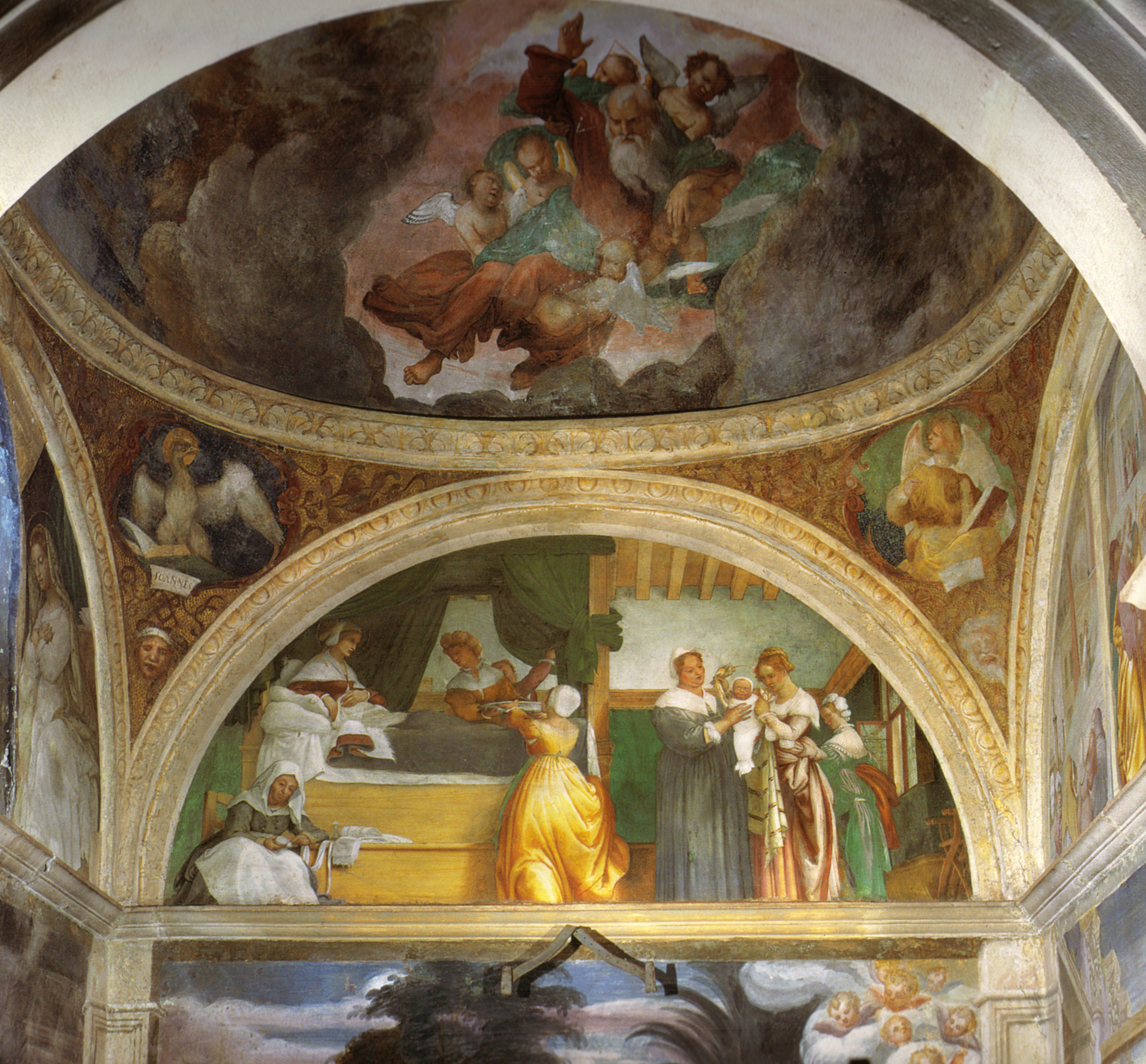
Birth of the Virgin from the cycle

Life of the Virgin or Scenes from the Life of the Virgin Mary is a 1525 cycle of frescoes by the Italian Renaissance artist Lorenzo Lotto in the chapel to the left of the Cappella Maggiore in San Michele al Pozzo Bianco in Bergamo. It was the last work Lotto produced in the city. Outside the chapel is a work showing The Visitation, whilst the main four paintings of the cycle show The Birth of the Virgin, The Presentation in the Temple, Betrothal of the Virgin and The Annunciation. Above these are a dome (God Surrounded by Angels) and four pendentives showing the Evangelists.
