= Bosse (name) =

Bosse is both a surname and a given name. Notable people with the name include:

Surname

- Abraham Bosse (c. 1600 – 1676), French artist
- Chris Bosse (born 1971), German architect
- Edda Bosse (born 1953), German protestant theologian and church president in Bremen
- Ewald Bosse (1880–1956), Swedish-Norwegian sociologist and economist
- Gustav Bosse (1884–1943), German music publisher
- Hans Bosse (1938–2023), German sociologist and ethnologist
- Harriet Bosse (1878–1961), Swedish actress
- Henry Peter Bosse (1844–1903), German American photographer
- Käte Bosse-Griffiths (1910–1998), German Egyptologist and Welsh language writer
- Leigh D. Bosse (born 1947), American politician
- Lili Bosse, current mayor of Beverly Hills, California
- Malcolm Bosse (1926–2002), American author
- Pierre-Ambroise Bosse (born 1992), French athlete
- Raul Bosse (1945–2023), Brazilian football goalkeeper
- Stefan Bosse (born 1964), German politician
- Walter Bosse (1904–1979), a Viennese artist, designer, ceramist, potter, metalworker, and craftsman noted for his modernist bronze animal figurines and grotesques.

Given name

- Bosse Ringholm (born 1942), Swedish politician
