= Catharine Mans Bosio =

American biologist

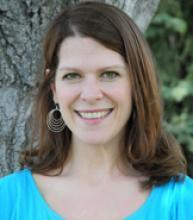
- Born: Catharine Ann Mans
- Education: Washington State University (BS); Colorado State University (PhD)
- Scientific career
- Fields: Immune system, pulmonary pathogens
- Workplaces: Colorado State University; National Institute of Allergy and Infectious Diseases
- Thesis: Progress towards development of new diagnostic tests and vaccines for bovine tuberculosis (1998)
- Doctoral advisor: Ian Orme; Dean Voss

Catharine "Katy" Mans Bosio is an American biologist. She is a senior investigator and chief of the immunity to pulmonary pathogens section at the National Institute of Allergy and Infectious Diseases.

== Early life and education ==
Catharine Ann Mans was born to Penny and Bill Mans. She graduated from Washington State University, cum laude, with a B.S. in 1993. Bosio earned a Ph.D. at Colorado State University (CSU) in 1998. Her dissertation was titled Progress towards development of new diagnostic tests and vaccines for bovine tuberculosis. Bosio's doctoral advisors were Ian Orme and Dean Voss. She completed postdoctoral fellowships at the Center for Biologics Evaluation and Research and at the United States Army Medical Research Institute of Infectious Diseases, studying innate immunity to Mycobacterium tuberculosis, Francisella tularensis, Marburg virus, and Zaire ebolavirus.

== Career and research ==
Bosio was an assistant professor at CSU in the department of microbiology, immunology, and pathology. She joined National Institute of Allergy and Infectious Diseases (NIAID) in 2007. Bosio is a senior investigator and chief of the NIAID immunity to pulmonary pathogens section. Her laboratory studies the host response to pulmonary pathogens, with special emphasis on virulent F. tularensis and dendritic cells, macrophages, and monocytes. Bosio researches innate immunity to F. tularensis, vaccine development for pneumonic tularemia, and modulation of human cells by F. tularensis.
