= Leigh D. Bosse =

American politician

Member of the New Hampshire House of Representatives from the Hillsborough 1st district
- In office 1976–1982

Personal details
- Born: March 16, 1947 (age 79) Henniker, New Hampshire, U.S.
- Party: Republican
- Education: University of New Hampshire; New England College

Leigh D. Bosse (born March 16, 1947) is an American politician. He served as a Republican member for the Hillsborough 1st district of the New Hampshire House of Representatives.

== Life and career ==
Bosse was born in Henniker, New Hampshire. He attended the University of New Hampshire and New England College.

Bosse served in the New Hampshire House of Representatives from 1976 to 1982.
