= Fabien Bossy =

French footballer and manager (born 1977)

Personal information
- Full name: Fabien Bossy
- Date of birth: 1 October 1977 (age 49)
- Place of birth: Marseille, France
- Height: 1.82 m (6 ft 0 in)
- Position: Central defender

Senior career*
Years	Team	Apps	(Gls)
1997–1998	Montpellier (B team)		
1998–1999	Marseille Endoume		
1999–2001	Académico de Viseu		
2000–2002	Clydebank	43	(0)
2002	Ayr United	1	(0)
2002–2003	Clyde	15	(0)
2003–2004	Darlington	6	(0)
2004–2005	Whitby Town	3	(0)
2005–2012	Fréjus		

Managerial career
- 2011–2016: Fréjus B
- * Club domestic league appearances and goals

Fabien Bossy (born 1 October 1977), is a French football retired central defender and current manager.

== Career ==
Bossy was born in Marseille. He joined Clydebank in 2002, but after the club was franchised in 2002, he had a brief spell with Ayr United, before spending a year with Clyde. He then moved to England, where he played for Darlington and Whitby Town. He returned in France and played for Étoile Fréjus Saint-Raphaël in Championnat National and CFA2 leagues. In December 2011, he was promoted as manager of the reserve squad of this team.
