= Milvia Boselli =

Italian politician (born 1943)

Anna Milva Boselli
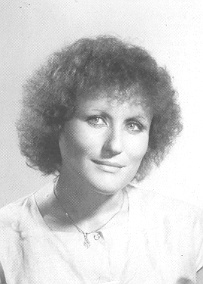

Member of the Chamber of Deputies
- In office 12 July 1983 – 22 April 1992

Personal details
- Born: 21 September 1943 (age 81); Reggio Emilia, Italy
- Political party: Italian Communist Party; Democratic Party of the Left; Democrats of the Left; Democratic Party

Anna Milva Boselli (born 21 September 1943) is a former Italian politician. She was a member of the Chamber of Deputies from 1983 to 1992, representing the Italian Communist Party, the Democratic Party of the Left and the Democrats of the Left.

== Biography ==
Boselli was born on 21 September 1943 in Reggio Emilia. She received a doctorate in biological sciences.

She was first elected to the Chamber of Deputies for Verona–Padova–Vicenza–Rovigo in the 1983 general election as a member of the Italian Communist Party. She was a member of the committee on public works. She was re-elected in the 1987 general election, after which she became a member of the committee on the environment, land and public works.

Following the dissolution of the Italian Communist Party at the svolta della Bolognina, she joined the Democratic Party of the Left in 1991 and then the Democrats of the Left in 1998. Boselli contested the Senate of the Republic as a candidate for the single-member constituency of L'Ulivo in the 2001 general election, but she was defeated by the centre-right candidate.

In 2004, she was elected as a municipal councilor in Padua, representing the Democrats of the Left. She served as president of the municipal council from 13 June 2004 until 6 June 2009. That year, she was re-elected as a councilor, this time as a representative for the Democratic Party, a position that she would hold until 25 May 2014.

== Works ==
- (with Alberto Baroni and Gianumberto Caravello), Everest between dreams, adventure and science. Twenty years of research in Nepal. Conversation with Aldo Comello (CLEUP 2014)
