= Bosso =

Bosso may refer to:

- Bosso, Nigeria, a Local Government Area in Niger State, Nigeria
- Bosso, Niger, a village and rural commune in Niger
- Bosso (surname), Italian surname
