= Henri Bossi =

Luxembourgish footballer

Personal information
- Date of birth: 20 February 1958 (age 68)
- Position: Midfielder

Senior career*
Years	Team	Apps	(Gls)
1975–1983	Progrès Niederkorn		

International career
1980	Luxembourg	1	(0)

Managerial career
- 1993–1994: Fola Esch
- 2009–2010: US Mondorf
- 2010–2012: Progrès Niederkorn
- 2012–2013: US Mondorf
- 2015–2016: Wiltz 71
- 2016–2019: US Hostert
- 2019: F91 Dudelange (assistant)
- * Club domestic league appearances and goals

Henri Bossi (born 20 February 1958) is a retired Luxembourgish football midfielder and later manager. He currently trains soccer teams.
