= Bossi =

Bossi may refer to:

- Bossi (surname)
- Bossi (organ builders), Italian organ builders
- Betty Bossi, a Swiss cookbook publisher
- Bossi Cup, an ice hockey tournament named for Luciano Bossi
- Stefan Bossems of Cosmic Gate, a German musician with the pseudonym "DJ Bossi"
- Dario Bossi, a fictional character from the video game series Castlevania

== See also ==
- Bosse (disambiguation)
