= Raul Bosse =

Brazilian footballer (1945–2023)

Personal information
- Full name: Raul Bosse
- Date of birth: 11 June 1945
- Place of birth: Corupá, Brazil
- Date of death: 18 August 2023 (aged 78)
- Place of death: Joinville, Brazil
- Position: Goalkeeper

Senior career*
Years	Team	Apps	(Gls)
1975	América de Joinville		
1976–1982	Joinville	252	(0)
1976	→ São Paulo (loan)	3	(0)
- * Club domestic league appearances and goals as of 28 December 2023

Raul Bosse (11 June 1945 – 18 August 2023), was a Brazilian professional footballer who played as a goalkeeper.

== Career ==
Born in Corupá, Raul Bosse became the first goalkeeper to play for Joinville EC, and is also the athlete with the most appearances for the club to date, with 252 matches. He was champion of Santa Catarina 5 times.

Raul Bosse also had a brief spell at São Paulo FC in 1976, playing just 3 matches.

== Honours ==
Joinville

- Campeonato Catarinense: 1976, 1979, 1980, 1981, 1982

== Death ==
Raul Bosse died 18 August 2023, in the city of Joinville.
