= Robert F. Bossie =

American politician

Member of the New Hampshire Senate from the 20th district
- In office 1972–1977
- Preceded by: Ronald J. Marcotte (redistricted)
- Succeeded by: Norman E. Champagne

Personal details
- Party: Democratic
- Education: Saint Anselm College (BA); Boston University (JD)
- Website: Attorney website

Robert F. Bossie is an American politician who served in the New Hampshire Senate from the 20th district between 1972 and 1977. His district consisted of Manchester's Wards 3, 10, 11, and 12.

Bossie had also served two terms as a Manchester alderman, and as a Captain Judge Advocate in the New Hampshire Air National Guard.

== Early life and education ==
Bossie attended Saint Anselm College and graduated with a Bachelor's Degree in History in 1963. While attending college in 1962, Bossie and Robert E. LeMay founded The Campus Crier, now known as The Saint Anselm Crier, as an independent student newspaper. He later attended at Boston University School of Law and received his Juris Doctor in 1966. Bossie has been a member of the New Hampshire Bar Association and the Massachusetts Bar Association since 1966, as well as a member of the Bar of the United States District Court for the District of New Hampshire.

== Political career ==
Bossie served two terms as an alderman in Manchester, New Hampshire. Although Bossie is a registered Democrat, during his three terms as state senator from 1972 to 1977, Bossie had run in both the Republican and Democratic party primaries and earned the nomination for both parties.

In 1977, Sen. Bossie was the sole negative vote in the New Hampshire Senate for an amendment to guarantee that Governor Meldrim Thomson would appoint a student trustee that would rotate annually between the three campuses of the University System of New Hampshire (Plymouth, Keene, and University of New Hampshire). During the same legislative session, the New Hampshire Legislature voted for two "unusual song laws", and Bossie was appointed by President of the New Hampshire Senate Alf E. Jacobson to the New Hampshire State Song Selection Board which selected "Old New Hampshire" as the official state song.

In 1984, Bossie served as a Democratic party delegate at the platform committee during the 1984 Democratic National Convention's midterm debates in Manchester, New Hampshire.

== Life after politics ==
From 1991 to 1992, Bossie served as the District Governor for Rotary International District 7870.

Bossie works as an attorney as part of Bossie, Wilson, & Strasburger, PLLC., and lives in New Castle, New Hampshire.
