= Costante Adolfo Bossi =

Italian organist, composer and teacher

Costante Adolfo Bossi (1876 – 1953) was an Italian organist, composer and teacher. He was the brother of Marco Enrico Bossi and son of Pietro Bossi.

He taught at the Milan Conservatory.
