= Bossé =

Bossé can be:

- A common name of African trees in the genus Guarea
- A surname. Notable people named Bossé include:
  - Anne-Élisabeth Bossé (born 1984), Canadian actress
  - Georges Bossé, Canadian politician
  - Joseph Guillaume Bossé, Canadian politician
  - Joseph-Noël Bossé (1807–1881), Canadian politician
  - Steve Bossé (born 1981), Canadian mixed martial artist
