= Marco Enrico Bossi =

Italian composer

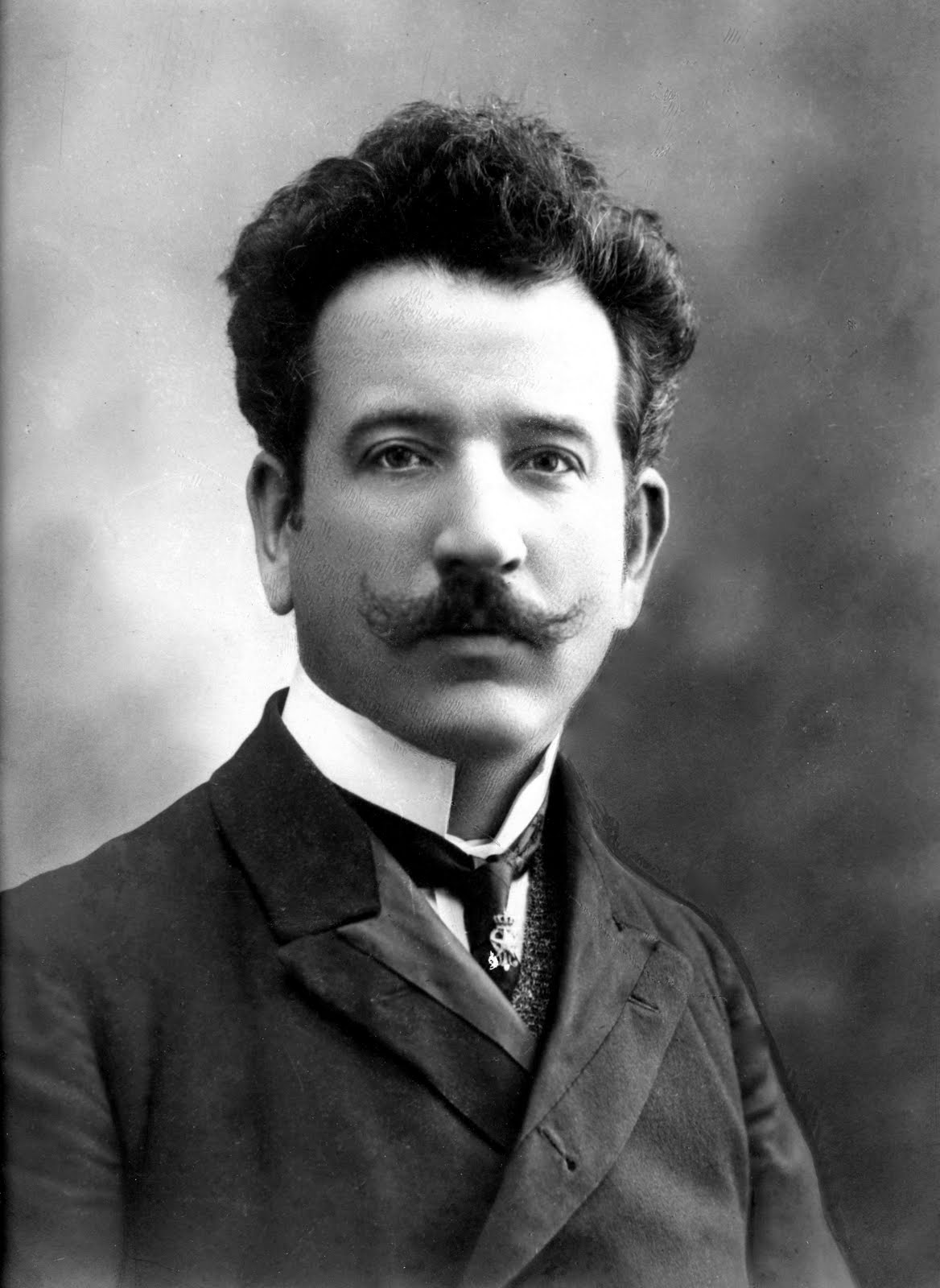
- Marco Bossi in Moscow, 1906
- Born: 25 April 1861; Salò, Italy
- Died: 20 February 1925 (aged 63); At sea
- Resting place: Como, Italy
- Occupation: Organist
- Era: Romantic
- Relatives: Costante Adolfo Bossi (brother)

Marco Enrico Bossi (25 April 1861 – 20 February 1925) was an Italian organist, composer, improviser and teacher.

== Life ==
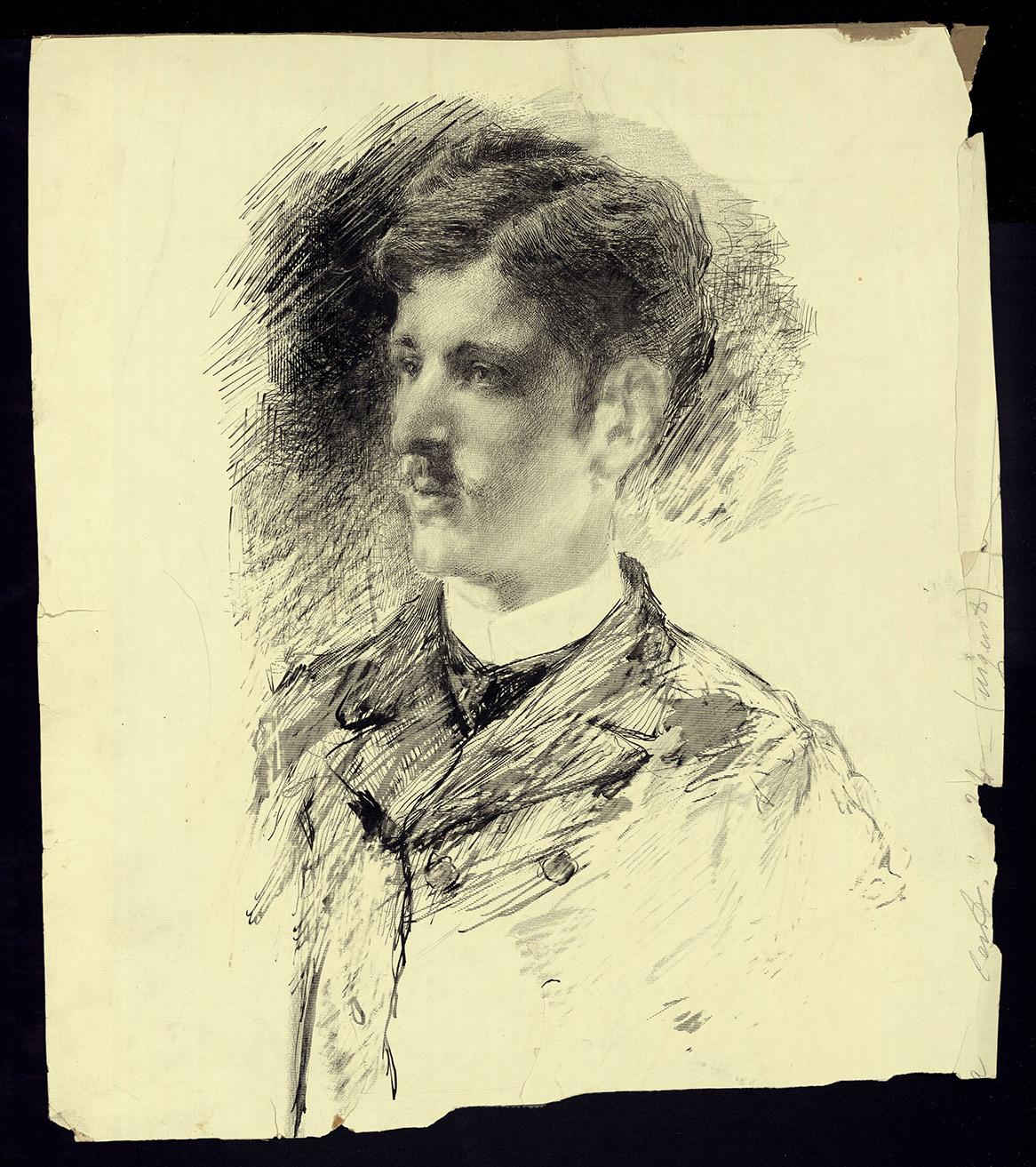
Portrait of Marco Enrico Bossi

Bossi was born in Salò, a town in the province of Brescia, Lombardy, into a family of musicians. His father, Pietro, was organist at Salò Cathedral, which has a one-manual organ built by Fratelli Serassi from 1865 (opus 684), which was restored in 2000/2001. He had two brothers, Costante Adolfo Bossi and Pietro Bossi.

He received his musical training at the Liceo Musicale in Bologna and the Milan Conservatory, where his teachers included Amintore Galli (counterpoint and musical aesthetics), Francesco Sangalli (piano), Amilcare Ponchielli (composition) and Polibio Fumagalli (organ).

In 1881, Bossi became director of music and organist at Como Cathedral. Nine years later, he was appointed professor of organ and harmony at the Naples Conservatory. In addition, he held directorships at conservatories in Venice (1895–1901), Bologna (1902–1911) and Rome (1916–1923), where he established and implemented the standards of organ studies that are still used in Italy today. His notable pupils included Giulio Bas, Giacomo Benvenuti, Giorgio Federico Ghedini, and Gian Francesco Malipiero. Throughout his career, Bossi made numerous international organ recital tours, which brought him in contact with well-known colleagues such as César Franck, Marcel Dupré, Alexandre Guilmant, Joseph Bonnet, Camille Saint-Saëns, Charles M. Courboin, and Karl Straube.

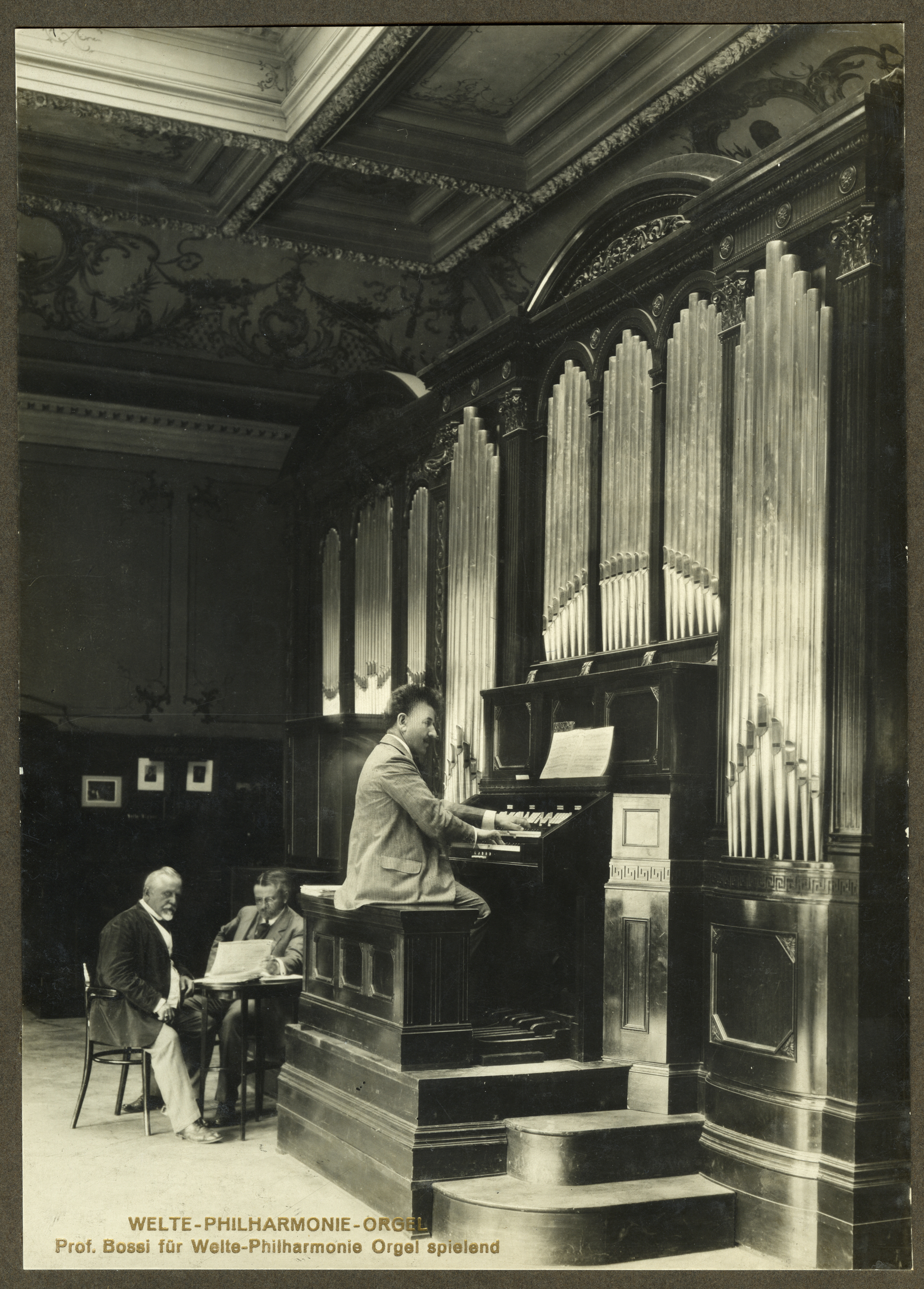
Recording session with Bossi for the Welte-Philharmonic-Organ, 1912.

In November 1924, Bossi embarked on a recital tour to New York and Philadelphia, where he made important appearances at Wanamaker's department store in Philadelphia, where he played the Wanamaker Organ, the world's largest pipe organ and at Wanamaker's store in New York City which also housed a large organ. Bossi was ill during his U.S. trip. He died unexpectedly at sea while returning from the United States on 20 February 1925, and was interred at Como. (Bossi's tomb places his death on the 21st.)

== Compositions ==
Marco Enrico Bossi wrote more than 150 works for various genres (orchestra, five operas, oratorios, choral and chamber music, as well as pieces for piano and organ). His catalogue of compositions is still largely unknown, except for his organ works. Andrea Macinanti is recording Marco Enrico Bossi's complete organ works for the Tactus label.

=== Organ solo ===
- Tempo di suonata per organo a pieno, Op. 3
- Ouverture per organo, Op. 3 No. 3
- Intermezzo tragico, Op. 10
- Scherzo in F major, Op. 49 No. 1
- Scherzo in G minor, Op. 49 No. 2
- Impromptu à la Chopin, Op. 49 No. 3
- Inno trionfale, Op. 53
- Res Severa Magnum Gaudium: Prima suite di 4 pezzi per organo, Op. 54. Includes Preludio; Allegro moderato; Corale; Fuga
- 4 Pieces, Op. 59:. Includes Toccata; Pastorale; Meditazione; Offertorio
- First Sonata in D minor, Op. 60
- Fuga sul tema 'Feda a Bach', Op. 62
- Fantaisie, Op. 64
- Marcia di processione, Op. 68
- 6 Pieces, Op. 70. Includes Prélude; Musette; Choral; Scherzo; Cantabile; Alleluja Final
- Second Sonata, Op. 71
- Marche héroïque, Op. 72
- Siciliana e giga, Op. 73 (1905); original for flute and piano; transcriptions by Renzo Bossi (composer) (1934) and Virgil Fox (1963)
- 3 Pieces, Op. 74. Includes Preghiera; Siciliana; Offertorio
- Cantate Domino. Westminster Abbey - Hymne of Glory/Hymne de Gloire, Op. 76 for organ solo or organ and choir
- Étude symphonique, Op. 78
- 3 Pieces, Op. 92. Includes Chant du soir in F major; Idylle in B major; Allegretto in A♭ major
- 2 Pieces, Op. 94. Includes Élevation in E♭ major; Noël in G major
- Scherzo, Op. 95
- 3 Pieces, Op. 97. Includes Andante con moto; Aspiration; Grand Chœur
- 5 Pieces, Op. 104. Includes Entrée Pontificale in C major; Ave Maria in F major; Offertoire in D minor; Résignationin G major; Rédemption in C major
- Missa pro sponso et sponsa, Op. 110. Includes Graduale; Offertorio; Communio; [Savoya-Petrovich.] Marcia Nuziale/Hochzeits-Marsch
- 5 Pieces, Op. 113. Includes Offertorio; Graduale; Canzoncina a Maria Vergine; In memoriam; Laudate Dominum
- Thema und Variationen, Op. 115
- 10 Compositions for Organ, Op. 118. Includes Preludio; Fughetta; Pastorale; Angelus à 3; Toccata di concerto; Melodia; Invocazione; Marcia festiva; Intermezzo à 3; Finale
- Pièce héroïque in D minor, Op. 128
- Concert Piece in C minor, Op. 130
- 5 Pieces in free style, Op. 132. Includes Legende in D♭ major; Trauerzug in B♭ minor; Ländliche Szene in D major; Stunde der Weihe in B major; Stunde der Freude in C major
- Improvisation, Op. 134 No. 2
- 3 Momenti francescani, Op. 140. Includes Fervore; Colloquio colle rondini; Beatitudine
- Triptico, Op. 142
- Meditazione in una cattedrale, Op. 144
- 2 Morceaux caractéristiques. Includes Preghiera. Fatemi la grazia in E major; Marcia dei Bardi in A♭ major
- Intermezzo lirico in A♭ major
- Flora mistica
- Postludio in E minor
- Ave Maria
- Solo di Clarinetto
- Scherzo (terzo tempo della Sinfonia tematica)
- Rapsodia
- Crepuscolo

=== Organ with other instruments ===
- Ave Maria No. 1, Op. 50, for organ, voice & violin
- Adagio in A♭ major, Op. 84, for violin and organ
- Concerto for organ, Op. 100
  - 1st version in B♭ minor with large orchestra
  - 2nd version in A minor with four horns, timpani and string orchestra
- Entrata pontificale, Op. 104 No. 1, for two organs
- Benediction nuptiale, Op. 111 No. 1, for cello and organ (1897)
- Concert Piece in C minor, Op. 130, for organ and orchestra
- Epousailles - Sposalizio, Op. 134 No. 1
  - Méditation réligieuse (violino, vioncello, arpa e organo)
- Fantasia sinfonica, Op. 147, for organ and orchestra

=== Chamber music ===
- Sonata No. 1 in E minor, Op. 82, for violin and piano
- Siciliana e giga (in stile antico), Op. 73, for flute and piano (1905); also for small orchestra
- Romance in A♭ major, Op. 89, for cello or viola and piano (1894)
- Four Pieces in the Form of a Suite, Op. 99, for violin and piano
- Trio in D minor, Op. 107, for violin, cello and piano
- 3 Feuillets d'album, Op. 111, for cello and piano
- Sonata No. 2 in C major, Op. 117, for violin and piano
- Trio sinfonico in D major, Op. 123, for violin, cello and piano
- Il Canto dell'Anima, for cello and piano
- Improvviso, for flute and piano
- Santa Caterina da Siena, "Poemetto" for violin, string quartet, harp, celesta and organ

=== Piano ===
- 7 Waltzes, Op. 93 (for piano duet)
- 5 Morceaux, Op. 95 [opus # doubtful]
- 4 Pièces en forme d'une suite ancienne, Op. 103
- 4 Morceaux, Op. 109
- Album for the Young, Op. 122. Includes Caresses; Souvenir; Scherzando; Nocturne; Babillage; Gondoliera; Valse charmante; Berceuse
- Intermezzi goldoniani, Op. 127
- 6 Kinderstücke, Op. 133
- Satire musicali
- Papillons dorés

=== Vocal and orchestra works ===
- Ouverture sinfonica in E major, Op. 1, for orchestra
- Salve Regina, Op. 8
- Siciliana e giga in stile antico, Op. 73, for small orchestra (1905); also for flute and piano
- Missa pro defunctis, Op. 83, for chorus
- Dio siete buono, Op. 98
- The Blind, Op. 112; lyric scene for baritone, choir and orchestra
- In memoriam No. 4, Op. 113. No. 4, for chorus
- Canticum canticorum, Op. 120; biblical cantata in three parts for baritone, soprano, choirs, orchestra and organ
- Il Paradiso perduto, Op. 125; sinfonic poem in a prologue and three parts for soloists, choir, orchestra and organ
- Suite in D minor, Op. 126, for timpani, percussion, harp and strings
- Intermezzi Goldoniani, Op. 127, for string orchestra
- Johanna d'Arc, Op. 135; a mystery in a prologue and three parts (12 images) for soloists, mixed choir, male choir, children's choirs (boys' and girls' parts), large orchestra and organ
- Il Viandante; lyric drama
- Sanctus et Benedictus, for alto and organ
- A Raffaello divino, for mixed choir a capella

== Sources ==
- Marco Enrico Bossi: "Ancora sulla questione degli organi", in Gazetta Musicale di Milano vol. 40 no. 34 (23 August 1885), p. 203.
- Marco Enrico Bossi & Tebaldini (eds): Metodo teorico pratico per organo (Milan: Carisch, 1893/97).
- Ennio Cominetti: Marco Enrico Bossi (Sannicandro Garganico: Gioiosa Editrice, 1999).
- Federico Mompellio: Marco Enrico Bossi (Milan: Ulrico Hoepli, 1952).
