= Lorenzo Gasperoni =

Sammarinese footballer

Personal information
- Date of birth: January 3, 1990 (age 36)
- Position: Midfielder

Senior career*
Years	Team	Apps	(Gls)
2011–2021	Juvenes/Dogana	91	(7)
2021–2023	Libertas	45	(1)
2023–2024	Tre Penne	23	(1)

International career
2014–2016	San Marino	4	(0)
- * Club domestic league appearances and goals as of 1 June 2024

Lorenzo Gasperoni (born 3 January 1990) is a Sammarinese footballer who last played at Tre Penne and for the San Marino national football team. He played as an attacking midfielder.

== International ==
Gasperoni made his debut for the senior team in October 2013. He played the penultimate match of 2014 FIFA World Cup Qualification. San Marino travelled to Chişinău to play against Moldova. Gasperoni came on for Carlo Valentini as an eightieth-minute substitute as San Marino lost 3–0 in the Zimbru Stadium.
