= La Bosse =

La Bosse may refer to several places in France:

- La Bosse, Doubs
- La Bosse, Loir-et-Cher, now part of Vievy-le-Rayé
- La Bosse, Sarthe
- La Bosse-de-Bretagne, Ille-et-Vilaine
