= Bossio =

Bossio is a surname of Spanish origin. It is similar to Bosio.

== List of people with the surname ==
- Agustín Bossio (born 1983), Argentine football Goalkeeper
- Ángel Bossio (1905–1978), Argentine football Goalkeeper
- Bill Bossio (1928–2016), American boxer
- Carlos Bossio (born 1973), Argentine professional footballer
- Diego Bossio (born 1979), Argentine economist
- Lucas Bossio (born 1990), Argentine professional footballer
- Miguel Bossio (born 1960), Uruguayan footballer
- Mike Bossio (born 1960 or 1961), Canadian politician
- Paula Bossio, Australian author and illustrator
- Sara Bossio (born 1938), Uruguayan lawyer and former judge
