= Ian Orme =

British-American microbiologist and professor

Ian Orme (9 August 1952 – 19 June 2018) was a British-American microbiologist who was a distinguished professor at Colorado State University.
