= Giacomo Boselli =

Italian painter

Giacomo Boselli (1744 -1808) was an Italian ceramics sculptor and painter, of the Rococo period.

Trained in Marseille and Liguria, he mainly worked in his native town of Savona in his father's factory producing painted porcelain, maiolica, and earthenware. His wife Clara (Chiarina) Boselli was a skilled painter. In 2006, he was the focus of an exhibition titled The Spring of Giacomo Boselli which traveled from Savona to Genoa.
