= Johann Dominik Bossi =

Italian painter

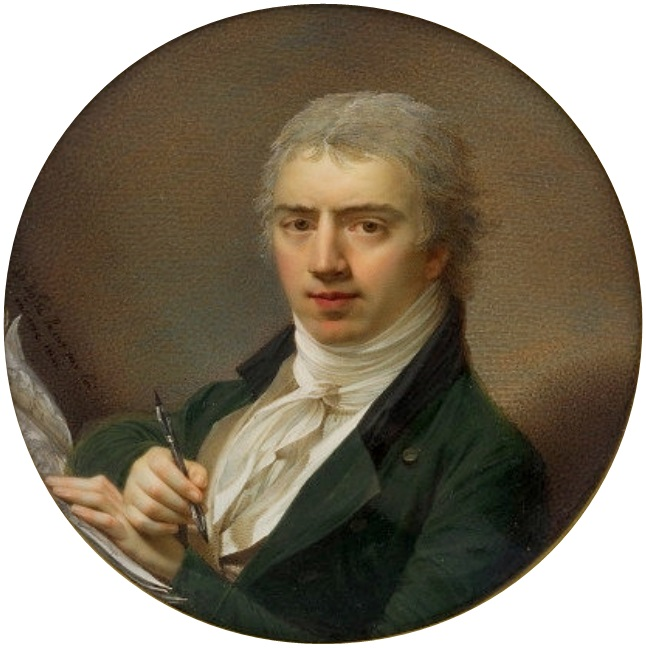
Self-portrait (1801), National Museum in Warsaw

Johann Dominik Bossi (1767–1853), also known as Domenico Bossi, was a painter.

Bossi, a student of Giovanni Domenico Tiepolo, was born in Trieste and worked primarily as a miniaturist in Germany, Austria, Sweden and Russia before he settled down in Munich, where he lived at Theresien Straße 19 in Munich around 1850. In Munich he was appointed a court painter. Bossi was the founder of a collection, which included a significant group of Tiepolo drawings amongst others. The collection passed to his daughter, Maria Theresa Caroline Bossi (1825–1881), and her husband, Carl Christian Friedrich Beyerlen (1826–1881). The Bossi-Beyerlen collection was sold at auction in Stuttgart and dispersed in March 1882.
