= Jamie Bosio (footballer, born March 1991) =

Gibraltarian footballer

Personal information
- Full name: Jamie Ralph Bosio
- Date of birth: 27 March 1991 (age 35)
- Place of birth: Gibraltar
- Position: Central defender

Team information
- Current team: Manchester 62
- Number: 27

Youth career
- 1995-2007: College Cosmos

Senior career*
Years	Team	Apps	(Gls)
2007–2015	Manchester 62		
2015–2016	Gibraltar United	6	(0)
2017–2018	FC Olympique 13	13	(0)
2018–2021	Lions Gibraltar	55	(0)
2021–2022	Europa	14	(0)
2022–	Manchester 62	27	(0)

International career^{‡}
2021–	Gibraltar	8	(0)
- * Club domestic league appearances and goals as of 16 March 2025 ‡ National team caps and goals as of 11 October 2021

Jamie Bosio (born 27 March 1991) is a Gibraltarian semi-professional association football player, who currently plays as a central defender for Manchester 62 and the Gibraltar national football team.

== International career ==
Bosio made his international debut for Gibraltar on 24 March 2021 against Norway.
