= Antonio Boselli =

Italian painter

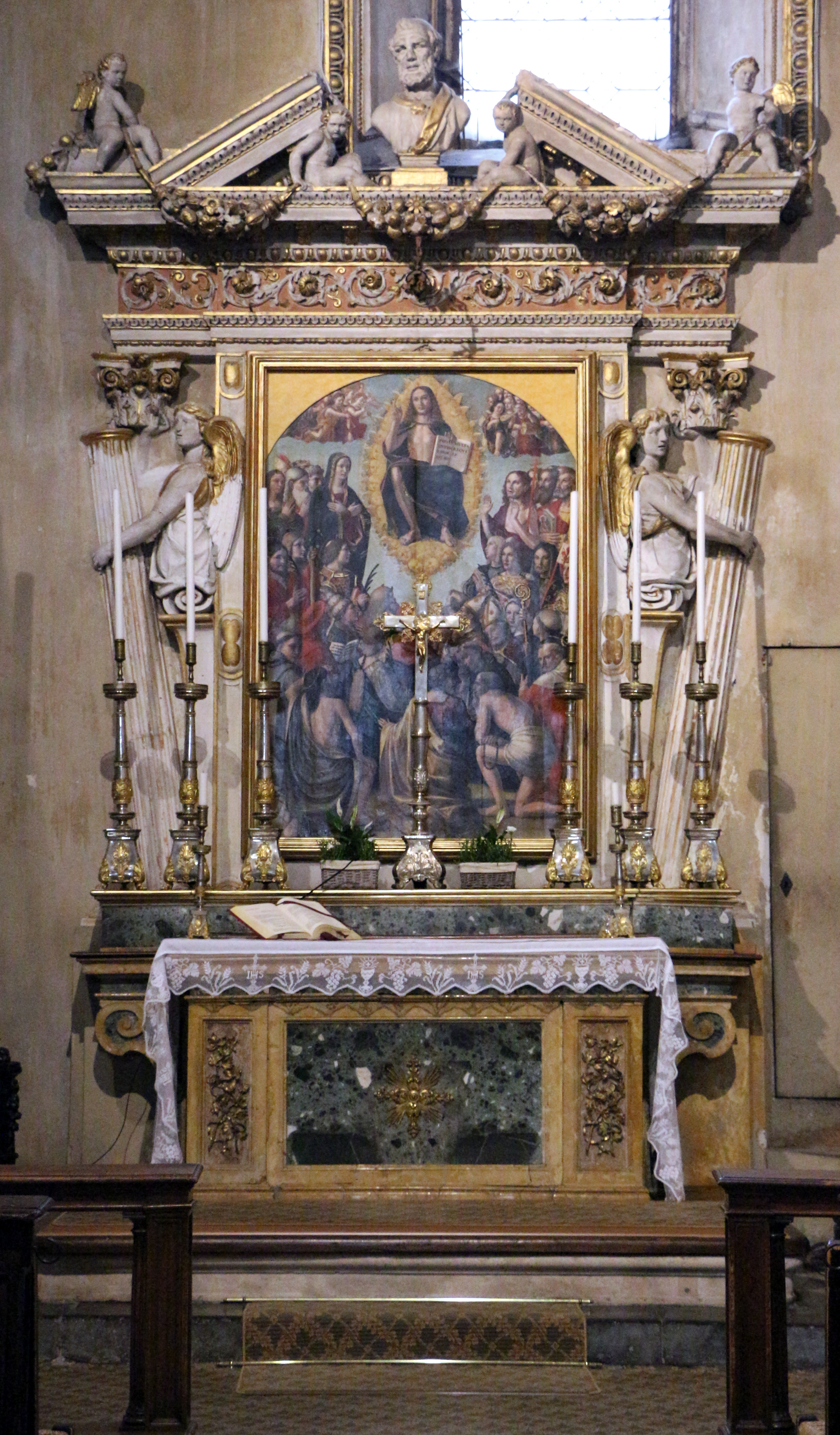
Risen Christ, 1514

Antonio Boselli (born circa 1470 - 1480 and died 1527 - 1532) was an Italian painter of the Renaissance period, active mainly in Bergamo.

== Biography ==
He was born in San Giovanni Bianco in the Val Brembana, and painted from 1495 to 1527, in a style more reminiscent of the Quattrocento. In Bergamo, he painted the Saints Peter, Paul, and Luke for the church of San Cristoforo. He also painted a Virgin, St Peter, and Magdalen (1495) in a church in Ponteranica. he painted in Romacolo and Zogno. He painted for the church of San Cristoforo, Seriate.
