= Jamie Bosio (footballer, born September 1991) =

Footballer (born September 1991)

Personal information
- Full name: James Louis Bosio
- Date of birth: 24 September 1991 (age 35)
- Place of birth: Dublin, Republic of Ireland
- Positions: Defensive midfielder; defender

Youth career
- 1996–1999: Home Farm
- 1999–2000: Peterborough United
- 2000–2008: Glacis United

Senior career*
Years	Team	Apps	(Gls)
2008–2013	Glacis United	73	(2)
2013–2015	College Europa	46	(3)
2015–2016	Lincoln Red Imps	1	(0)
2015	→ Ashford United (loan)	4	(0)
2015–2016	→ Canterbury City (loan)	17	(2)
2016–2019	Gibraltar United	55	(10)
2019–2020	Lincoln Red Imps	0	(0)
2021	Glacis United	4	(1)

International career
2015–2018	Gibraltar	12	(0)
- * Club domestic league appearances and goals

James Louis Bosio (born 24 September 1991) is an Irish futsal coach and former professional footballer. Mainly a defensive midfielder, he was able to play at left-back or centre-back in a career that saw him play at Glacis United, Europa, Lincoln Red Imps and Gibraltar United, alongside loan spells in England with Ashford United and Canterbury City. Born in the Republic of Ireland, he earned 12 caps for the Gibraltar national team.

== Club career ==
Bosio became Gibraltar's first captain in the UEFA Europa League when College Europa took on FC Vaduz of Liechtenstein in July 2014. He was part of the Lincoln Red Imps F.C. squad that made history by qualifying for the second round of the UEFA Champions League for the first time in July 2015. In 2016 he joined Gibraltar United, where he served as vice-captain. After Gibraltar United folded in 2019, he rejoined Lincoln Red Imps to play for their under-23 side in the Gibraltar Intermediate League, while he recovers from an ACL injury he suffered in October 2018. He also assisted the development of youth players in the team. In February 2021, he rejoined Glacis United. However, he retired from football at the end of the season.

He is a teacher in Gibraltar after completing his teacher training at Canterbury Christ Church University where he was awarded an Elite Sport Scholarship. He also serves as co-president and coach of Bavaria F.C.C.'s futsal team, and in 2019 joined the coaching staff of the Gibraltar women's futsal team. He is also a player for his futsal team as a player manager.

== International career ==
Bosio was eligible to represent either Gibraltar or the Republic of Ireland at international level. He decided to pledge his allegiance to Gibraltar and made his debut in their 4–0 defeat to Croatia in Varazdin on 6 June 2015 and his competitive debut against world champions Germany in the UEFA Euro 2016 Qualifiers a week later.

Bosio made his first competitive start for Gibraltar against Greece in the 2018 FIFA World Cup qualifiers in September 2016.

== Career statistics ==
Appearances and goals by national team and year
National team	Year	Apps	Goals
Gibraltar	2015	3	0
Gibraltar	2016	6	0
Gibraltar	2017	2	0
Gibraltar	2018	1	0
Total		12	0
