= 2015 in Norwegian football =

Football in Norway
- Season: 2015

Men's football
- Tippeligaen: Rosenborg
- 1. divisjon: Sogndal
- 2. divisjon: KFUM Oslo (Group 1); Raufoss (Group 2); Ullensaker/Kisa (Group 3); Kongsvinger (Group 4)
- Cupen: Rosenborg

Women's football
- Toppserien: LSK Kvinner
- 1. divisjon: Urædd
- Cupen: LSK Kvinner

The 2015 season was the 110th season of competitive football in Norway.

The season began in March, and ended on 22 November with the men's 2015 Norwegian Football Cup Final.

== Men's football ==
=== Promotion and relegation ===
Teams promoted to Tippeligaen

- Sandefjord
- Tromsø
- Mjøndalen

Teams relegated from Tippeligaen

- SK Brann
- Sogndal
- Sandnes Ulf

=== League season ===
==== Eliteserien ====
Pos	Team	Pld	W	D	L	GF	GA	GD	Pts	Qualification or relegation
1	Rosenborg (C)	30	21	6	3	73	27	+46	69	Qualification for the Champions League second qualifying round (Note: Rosenborg qualified for the Europa League second qualifying round by winning the 2015 Norwegian Cup. However, since they already qualified for European competition based on their league position, the spot awarded to the cup winners was passed down the league.)
2	Strømsgodset	30	17	6	7	67	44	+23	57	Qualification for the Europa League second qualifying round
3	Stabæk	30	17	5	8	54	43	+11	56	Qualification for the Europa League first qualifying round
4	Odd	30	15	10	5	61	41	+20	55	Qualification for the Europa League first qualifying round
5	Viking	30	17	2	11	53	39	+14	53	
6	Molde	30	15	7	8	62	31	+31	52	
7	Vålerenga	30	14	7	9	49	41	+8	49	
8	Lillestrøm (Note: Lillestrøm started the season with a one point deduction due to poor financial reporting.)	30	12	9	9	45	43	+2	44	
9	Bodø/Glimt	30	12	4	14	53	56	−3	40	
10	Aalesund	30	11	5	14	42	57	−15	38	
11	Sarpsborg 08	30	8	10	12	37	49	−12	34	
12	Haugesund	30	8	7	15	33	52	−19	31	
13	Tromsø	30	7	8	15	36	50	−14	29	
14	Start (O)	30	5	7	18	35	64	−29	22	Qualification for the relegation play-offs
15	Mjøndalen (R)	30	4	9	17	38	69	−31	21	Relegation to First Division
16	Sandefjord (R)	30	4	4	22	36	68	−32	16	Relegation to First Division

Source: Football Association of Norway (in Norwegian), Soccerway
Rules for classification: 1) Points; 2) Goal difference; 3) Goals scored; 4) Head-to-head points; 5) Head-to-head goal difference; 6) Head-to-head away goals scored (between two teams).
(C) Champions; (O) Play-off winners; (R) Relegated

==== 1. divisjon ====
Pos	Team	Pld	W	D	L	GF	GA	GD	Pts	Promotion, qualification or relegation
1	Sogndal (C, P)	30	18	8	4	59	31	+28	62	Promotion to Tippeligaen
2	Brann (P)	30	14	11	5	46	35	+11	53	Promotion to Tippeligaen
3	Kristiansund	30	14	7	9	37	30	+7	49	Qualification for the promotion play-offs
4	Hødd	30	14	6	10	43	40	+3	48	Qualification for the promotion play-offs
5	Jerv	30	12	11	7	47	28	+19	47	Qualification for the promotion play-offs
6	Ranheim	30	13	8	9	48	36	+12	47	Qualification for the promotion play-offs
7	Sandnes Ulf	30	13	8	9	49	40	+9	47	
8	Strømmen	30	10	7	13	33	39	−6	37	
9	Levanger	30	10	6	14	48	53	−5	36	
10	Bryne	30	10	6	14	43	50	−7	36	
11	Åsane	30	8	11	11	46	46	0	35	
12	Fredrikstad	30	8	11	11	41	61	−20	35	
13	Follo (R)	30	8	9	13	42	43	−1	33	Relegation to Second Division
14	Nest-Sotra (R)	30	8	7	15	41	51	−10	31	Relegation to Second Division
15	Bærum (R)	30	8	7	15	44	67	−23	31	Relegation to Second Division
16	Hønefoss (R)	30	7	7	16	35	52	−17	28	Relegation to Second Division

Source: nifs.no
Rules for classification: 1) points; 2) goal difference; 3) number of goals scored.
(C) Champions; (P) Promoted; (R) Relegated

==== 2. divisjon ====
===== Group 1 =====
Pos	Team	Pld	W	D	L	GF	GA	GD	Pts	Promotion or relegation
1	KFUM Oslo (P)	26	20	2	4	62	24	+38	62	Promotion to First Division
2	Tromsdalen	26	18	3	5	71	27	+44	57	
3	Grorud	26	17	3	6	71	30	+41	54	
4	Finnsnes	26	15	4	7	53	45	+8	49	
5	Kjelsås	26	13	7	6	62	33	+29	46	
6	Vålerenga 2	26	10	7	9	51	40	+11	37	
7	Stabæk 2	26	11	4	11	59	53	+6	37	
8	Harstad	26	9	7	10	34	42	−8	34	
9	Skeid	26	8	6	12	45	54	−9	30	
10	Senja	26	9	3	14	48	59	−11	30	
11	Ullern	26	6	7	13	33	47	−14	25	
12	Lyn (R)	26	7	4	15	41	64	−23	25	Relegation to Third Division
13	Mjølner (R)	26	5	3	18	21	67	−46	18	Relegation to Third Division
14	Holmen (R)	26	3	2	21	19	85	−66	11	Relegation to Third Division

Source: nifs.no
Rules for classification: 1) points; 2) goal difference; 3) number of goals scored.
(P) Promoted; (R) Relegated

===== Group 2 =====
Pos	Team	Pld	W	D	L	GF	GA	GD	Pts	Promotion or relegation
1	Raufoss (P)	26	20	4	2	76	28	+48	64	Promotion to First Division
2	Moss	26	18	3	5	65	31	+34	57	
3	Kvik Halden	26	16	5	5	59	25	+34	53	
4	Fram Larvik	26	13	8	5	60	42	+18	47	
5	Notodden	26	13	6	7	68	43	+25	45	
6	Alta	26	12	6	8	65	43	+22	42	
7	Gjøvik-Lyn	26	12	3	11	48	47	+1	39	
8	Nybergsund-Trysil	26	9	9	8	50	49	+1	36	
9	Lørenskog	26	9	6	11	47	40	+7	33	
10	Strømsgodset 2	26	10	2	14	55	61	−6	32	
11	Ørn-Horten	26	6	6	14	29	48	−19	24	
12	Lillestrøm 2 (R)	26	4	5	17	45	84	−39	17	Relegation to Third Division
13	Sprint-Jeløy (R)	26	3	6	17	31	65	−34	15	Relegation to Third Division
14	Drammen FK (R)	26	2	1	23	20	112	−92	7	Relegation to Third Division

Source: nifs.no
Rules for classification: 1) points; 2) goal difference; 3) number of goals scored.
(P) Promoted; (R) Relegated

===== Group 3 =====
Pos	Team	Pld	W	D	L	GF	GA	GD	Pts	Promotion or relegation
1	Ull/Kisa (P)	26	18	4	4	51	24	+27	58	Promotion to First Division
2	Egersund	26	16	7	3	55	22	+33	55	
3	Vard Haugesund	26	14	9	3	66	37	+29	51	
4	Vidar	26	10	10	6	60	44	+16	40	
5	Sola	26	9	8	9	49	52	−3	35	
6	Vindbjart	26	9	7	10	61	56	+5	34	
7	Arendal	26	9	7	10	46	51	−5	34	
8	Odd 2	26	8	7	11	58	49	+9	31	
9	Flekkerøy	26	8	7	11	30	44	−14	31	
10	Fana	26	7	10	9	42	57	−15	31	
11	Fyllingsdalen	26	8	5	13	44	50	−6	29	
12	Eidsvold Turn (R)	26	7	7	12	47	53	−6	28	Relegation to Third Division
13	Donn (R)	26	6	5	15	43	70	−27	23	Relegation to Third Division
14	Odda (R)	26	6	1	19	40	83	−43	19	Relegation to Third Division

Source: nifs.no
Rules for classification: 1) points; 2) goal difference; 3) number of goals scored.
(P) Promoted; (R) Relegated

===== Group 4 =====
Pos	Team	Pld	W	D	L	GF	GA	GD	Pts	Promotion or relegation
1	Kongsvinger (P)	26	20	2	4	63	19	+44	62	Promotion to First Division
2	Elverum	26	12	6	8	47	35	+12	42	
3	Nardo	26	12	5	9	39	37	+2	41	
4	HamKam	26	10	10	6	51	44	+7	40	
5	Byåsen	26	12	4	10	35	42	−7	40	
6	Florø	26	11	6	9	43	32	+11	39	
7	Stjørdals-Blink	26	11	5	10	42	44	−2	38	
8	Brumunddal	26	10	7	9	33	36	−3	37	
9	Strindheim	26	8	9	9	38	36	+2	33	
10	Førde	26	9	6	11	47	48	−1	33	
11	Molde 2	26	9	4	13	38	40	−2	31	
12	Aalesund 2 (R)	26	7	7	12	36	40	−4	28	Relegation to Third Division
13	Rødde (R)	26	5	6	15	32	55	−23	21	Relegation to Third Division
14	Træff (R)	26	5	5	16	27	63	−36	20	Relegation to Third Division

Source: nifs.no
Rules for classification: 1) points; 2) goal difference; 3) number of goals scored.
(P) Promoted; (R) Relegated

=== Norwegian Cup ===
==== Final ====
22 November 2015
13:15 CET (UTC+1)

Rosenborg	2–0	Sarpsborg 08
Helland 22'; Jensen 40'	Report

Ullevaal Stadion, Oslo
Attendance: 26,507
Referee: Ken Henry Johnsen (Husøy & Foynland)

== Women's football ==
=== Promotion and relegation ===
Teams promoted to Toppserien

- Urædd

Teams relegated from Toppserien

- Sandviken

=== League season ===
==== Toppserien ====
Pos	Team	Pld	W	D	L	GF	GA	GD	Pts	Qualification or relegation
1	LSK Kvinner (C)	22	18	2	2	58	16	+42	56	Qualification for the Champions League round of 32
2	Avaldsnes	22	16	3	3	60	15	+45	51	Qualification for the Champions League qualifying round
3	Røa	22	10	8	4	32	24	+8	38	
4	Stabæk	22	10	7	5	32	17	+15	37	
5	Kolbotn	22	9	5	8	45	28	+17	32	
6	Klepp	22	8	6	8	36	46	−10	30	
7	Arna-Bjørnar	22	7	5	10	35	45	−10	26	
8	Trondheims-Ørn	22	7	3	12	27	38	−11	24	
9	Sandviken	22	5	6	11	23	36	−13	21	
10	Vålerenga	22	6	3	13	22	42	−20	21	
11	Medkila (O)	22	5	2	15	28	63	−35	17	Qualification for the relegation play-offs
12	Amazon Grimstad (R)	22	4	4	14	22	50	−28	15 (Note: Amazon Grimstad were deducted 1 point for lack of financial control.)	Relegation to First Division

Source: NIFS
Rules for classification: 1) points; 2) goal difference; 3) number of goals scored.
(C) Champions; (O) Play-off winners; (R) Relegated

=== Norwegian Women's Cup ===
==== Final ====
- Avaldsnes 2–3 LSK Kvinner

== National teams ==
=== Norway men's national football team ===
==== UEFA Euro 2016 qualifying ====
===== Group A =====
Pos	Team	Pld	W	D	L	GF	GA	GD	Pts	Qualification	(Italy)	(Croatia)	(Norway)	(Bulgaria)	(Azerbaijan)	(Malta)
1	Italy	10	7	3	0	16	7	+9	24	Qualify for final tournament	—	1–1	2–1	1–0	2–1	1–0
2	Croatia (Note: Croatia were deducted one point after charges for racist behaviour in the home match against Italy.)	10	6	3	1	20	5	+15	20	Qualify for final tournament	1–1	—	5–1	3–0	6–0	2–0
3	Norway	10	6	1	3	13	10	+3	19	Advance to play-offs	0–2	2–0	—	2–1	0–0	2–0
4	Bulgaria	10	3	2	5	9	12	−3	11		2–2	0–1	0–1	—	2–0	1–1
5	Azerbaijan	10	1	3	6	7	18	−11	6		1–3	0–0	0–1	1–2	—	2–0
6	Malta	10	0	2	8	3	16	−13	2		0–1	0–1	0–3	0–1	2–2	—

Source: UEFA
Rules for classification: Qualification tiebreakers
Notes:

28 March 2015 UEFA Euro 2016 qualifying	Croatia	5–1	Norway	Zagreb, Croatia
18:00 (UTC+1)	Brozović 30'; Perišić 53'; Olić 65'; Schildenfeld 87'; Pranjić 90+4'	Report	Tettey 80'	Stadium: Stadion Maksimir; Attendance: 23,920; Referee: Carlos Velasco Carballo (Spain)

8 June 2015 Exhibition game	Norway	0–0	Sweden	Oslo, Norway
20:00 (UTC+1)		Report		Stadium: Ullevaal Stadion; Attendance: 26,659; Referee: Anthony Taylor (England)

12 June 2015 UEFA Euro 2016 qualifying	Norway	0–0	Azerbaijan	Oslo, Norway
20:45 (UTC+2)		Report		Stadium: Ullevaal Stadion; Attendance: 21,228; Referee: Paweł Gil (Poland)

3 September 2015 UEFA Euro 2016 qualifying	Bulgaria	0–1	Norway	Sofia, Bulgaria
21:45 (UTC+3)		Report	Forren 57'	Stadium: Vasil Levski National Stadium; Attendance: 12,913; Referee: Bas Nijhuis (Netherlands)

6 September 2015 UEFA Euro 2016 qualifying	Norway	2–0	Croatia	Oslo, Norway
18:00 (UTC+2)	Berget 51'; Ćorluka 69' (o.g.)	Report		Stadium: Ullevaal Stadion; Attendance: 26,751; Referee: Viktor Kassai (Hungary)

10 October 2015 UEFA Euro 2016 qualifying	Norway	2–0	Malta	Oslo, Norway
18:00 (UTC+2)	Tettey 19'; Søderlund 52'	Report		Stadium: Ullevaal Stadion; Attendance: 27,120; Referee: Arnold Hunter (Northern Ireland)

13 October 2015 UEFA Euro 2016 qualifying	Italy	2–1	Norway	Rome, Italy
20:45 (UTC+2)	Florenzi 73'; Pellè 82'	Report	Tettey 23'	Stadium: Stadio Olimpico; Attendance: 30,000; Referee: Felix Brych (Germany)

===== Play-offs =====
12 November 2015 UEFA Euro 2016 qualifying play-offs	Norway	0–1	Hungary	Oslo, Norway
20:45 (UTC+1)		Report	László 26'	Stadium: Ullevaal Stadion; Attendance: 27,182; Referee: Mark Clattenburg (England)

15 November 2015 UEFA Euro 2016 qualifying play-offs	Hungary	2–1 (3–1 agg.)	Norway	Budapest, Hungary
20:45 (UTC+1)	Tamás 14'; Henriksen 83' (o.g.)	Report	Henriksen 87'	Stadium: Groupama Arena; Attendance: 22,168; Referee: Carlos Velasco Carballo (Spain)
