= UEFA Euro 2016 Group D =

Football tournament group stage

Group D of UEFA Euro 2016 contained defending European champion Spain, Czech Republic, Turkey and Croatia. This Euro 2016 group was the only with two former European champions – Spain (3 times) and Czech Republic (1 time, as Czechoslovakia). Matches were played from 12 to 21 June 2016.

== Teams ==
Draw position	Team	Pot	Method of qualification	Date of qualification	Finals appearance	Last appearance	Previous best performance	UEFA Rankings October 2015 (Note: The UEFA rankings of October 2015 were used for seeding for the final draw.)	FIFA Rankings June 2016
D1	Spain	1	Group C winner	9 October 2015	10th	2012	Winners (1964, 2008, 2012)	2	6
D2	Czech Republic (Note: From 1960 to 1980, the Czech Republic competed as Czechoslovakia.)	3	Group A winner	6 September 2015	9th	2012	Winners (1976)	15	30
D3	Turkey	4	Best third-placed team	13 October 2015	4th	2008	Semi-finals (2008)	22	18
D4	Croatia	2	Group H runner-up	13 October 2015	5th	2012	Quarter-finals (1996, 2008)	12	27

== Standings ==
Pos	Team	Pld	W	D	L	GF	GA	GD	Pts	Qualification
1	Croatia	3	2	1	0	5	3	+2	7	Advance to knockout stage
2	Spain	3	2	0	1	5	2	+3	6	Advance to knockout stage
3	Turkey	3	1	0	2	2	4	−2	3	
4	Czech Republic	3	0	1	2	2	5	−3	1	

Source: UEFA
Rules for classification: Group stage tiebreakers

In the round of 16,

- The winner of Group D, Croatia, advanced to play the third-placed team of Group F, Portugal.
- The runner-up of Group D, Spain, advanced to play the winner of Group E, Italy.

== Matches ==
=== Turkey vs Croatia ===
12 June 2016
15:00

Turkey	0–1	Croatia
	Report	Modrić 41'

Parc des Princes, Paris
Attendance: 43,842
Referee: Jonas Eriksson (Sweden)

Turkey	Croatia

GK	1	Volkan Babacan
RB	7	Gökhan Gönül
CB	15	Mehmet Topal
CB	3	Hakan Balta	(yellow card) 48'
LB	18	Caner Erkin
CM	16	Ozan Tufan
CM	8	Selçuk İnan
CM	14	Oğuzhan Özyakup		(substituted off) 46'
RW	6	Hakan Çalhanoğlu
LW	10	Arda Turan (c)		(substituted off) 65'
CF	9	Cenk Tosun	(yellow card) 31'	(substituted off) 69'
Substitutions:
MF	20	Volkan Şen	(yellow card) 90+1'	(substituted on) 46'
FW	17	Burak Yılmaz		(substituted on) 65'
FW	21	Emre Mor		(substituted on) 69'
Manager:
Fatih Terim

GK	23	Danijel Subašić
RB	11	Darijo Srna (c)
CB	5	Vedran Ćorluka
CB	21	Domagoj Vida
LB	3	Ivan Strinić	(yellow card) 80'
CM	10	Luka Modrić
CM	19	Milan Badelj
RW	14	Marcelo Brozović
AM	7	Ivan Rakitić		(substituted off) 90'
LW	4	Ivan Perišić		(substituted off) 87'
CF	17	Mario Mandžukić		(substituted off) 90+3'
Substitutions:
FW	9	Andrej Kramarić		(substituted on) 87'
DF	13	Gordon Schildenfeld		(substituted on) 90'
FW	20	Marko Pjaca		(substituted on) 90+3'
Manager:
Ante Čačić

Man of the Match:
Luka Modrić (Croatia)

Assistant referees:
Mathias Klasenius (Sweden)
Daniel Wärnmark (Sweden)
Fourth official:
Willie Collum (Scotland)
Additional assistant referees:
Stefan Johannesson (Sweden)
Markus Strömbergsson (Sweden)
Reserve assistant referee:
Damien MacGraith (Republic of Ireland)

=== Spain vs Czech Republic ===
13 June 2016
15:00

Spain	1–0	Czech Republic
Piqué 87'	Report

Stadium Municipal, Toulouse
Attendance: 29,400
Referee: Szymon Marciniak (Poland)

Spain	Czech Republic

GK	13	David de Gea
RB	16	Juanfran
CB	3	Gerard Piqué
CB	15	Sergio Ramos (c)
LB	18	Jordi Alba
DM	5	Sergio Busquets
CM	10	Cesc Fàbregas	(substituted off) 70'
CM	6	Andrés Iniesta
RW	21	David Silva
LW	22	Nolito	(substituted off) 82'
CF	7	Álvaro Morata	(substituted off) 62'
Substitutions:
FW	20	Aritz Aduriz	(substituted on) 62'
MF	14	Thiago	(substituted on) 70'
FW	11	Pedro	(substituted on) 82'
Manager:
Vicente del Bosque

GK	1	Petr Čech
RB	2	Pavel Kadeřábek
CB	6	Tomáš Sivok
CB	5	Roman Hubník
LB	8	David Limberský	(yellow card) 61'
CM	22	Vladimír Darida
CM	13	Jaroslav Plašil
RW	4	Theodor Gebre Selassie		(substituted off) 86'
AM	10	Tomáš Rosický (c)		(substituted off) 88'
LW	19	Ladislav Krejčí
CF	7	Tomáš Necid		(substituted off) 75'
Substitutions:
FW	21	David Lafata		(substituted on) 75'
MF	18	Josef Šural		(substituted on) 86'
MF	15	David Pavelka		(substituted on) 88'
Manager:
Pavel Vrba

Man of the Match:
Andrés Iniesta (Spain)

Assistant referees:
Paweł Sokolnicki (Poland)
Tomasz Listkiewicz (Poland)
Fourth official:
Aleksei Kulbakov (Belarus)
Additional assistant referees:
Paweł Raczkowski (Poland)
Tomasz Musiał (Poland)
Reserve assistant referee:
Vitali Maliutsin (Belarus)

=== Czech Republic vs Croatia ===
17 June 2016
18:00

Czech Republic	2–2	Croatia
Škoda 76'; Necid 89' (pen.)	Report	Perišić 37'; Rakitić 59'

Stade Geoffroy-Guichard, Saint-Étienne
Attendance: 38,376
Referee: Mark Clattenburg (England)

Czech Republic	Croatia

GK	1	Petr Čech
RB	2	Pavel Kadeřábek
CB	5	Roman Hubník
CB	6	Tomáš Sivok	(yellow card) 72'
LB	8	David Limberský
DM	13	Jaroslav Plašil		(substituted off) 86'
RM	10	Tomáš Rosický (c)
CM	20	Jiří Skalák		(substituted off) 67'
CM	19	Ladislav Krejčí
LM	22	Vladimír Darida
CF	21	David Lafata		(substituted off) 67'
Substitutions:
FW	12	Milan Škoda		(substituted on) 67'
MF	18	Josef Šural		(substituted on) 67'
FW	7	Tomáš Necid		(substituted on) 86'
Manager:
Pavel Vrba

GK	23	Danijel Subašić
RB	11	Darijo Srna (c)
CB	5	Vedran Ćorluka
CB	21	Domagoj Vida	(yellow card) 88'
LB	3	Ivan Strinić		(substituted off) 90+3'
CM	19	Milan Badelj	(yellow card) 14'
CM	10	Luka Modrić		(substituted off) 62'
RW	14	Marcelo Brozović	(yellow card) 74'
AM	7	Ivan Rakitić		(substituted off) 90+2'
LW	4	Ivan Perišić
CF	17	Mario Mandžukić
Substitutions:
MF	8	Mateo Kovačić		(substituted on) 62'
DF	13	Gordon Schildenfeld		(substituted on) 90+2'
DF	2	Šime Vrsaljko		(substituted on) 90+3'
Manager:
Ante Čačić

Man of the Match:
Ivan Rakitić (Croatia)

Assistant referees:
Simon Beck (England)
Jake Collin (England)
Fourth official:
Anastasios Sidiropoulos (Greece)
Additional assistant referees:
Anthony Taylor (England)
Andre Marriner (England)
Reserve assistant referee:
Damianos Efthymiadis (Greece)

=== Spain vs Turkey ===
17 June 2016
21:00

Spain	3–0	Turkey
Morata 34', 48'; Nolito 37'	Report

Stade de Nice, Nice
Attendance: 33,409
Referee: Milorad Mažić (Serbia)

Spain	Turkey

GK	13	David de Gea
RB	16	Juanfran
CB	3	Gerard Piqué
CB	15	Sergio Ramos (c)	(yellow card) 2'
LB	18	Jordi Alba		(substituted off) 81'
DM	5	Sergio Busquets
CM	10	Cesc Fàbregas		(substituted off) 71'
CM	6	Andrés Iniesta
RW	21	David Silva		(substituted off) 64'
LW	22	Nolito
CF	7	Álvaro Morata
Substitutions:
MF	19	Bruno Soriano		(substituted on) 64'
MF	8	Koke		(substituted on) 71'
DF	2	César Azpilicueta		(substituted on) 81'
Manager:
Vicente del Bosque

GK	1	Volkan Babacan
RB	7	Gökhan Gönül
CB	15	Mehmet Topal
CB	3	Hakan Balta
LB	18	Caner Erkin
CM	16	Ozan Tufan	(yellow card) 41'
CM	8	Selçuk İnan		(substituted off) 70'
CM	14	Oğuzhan Özyakup		(substituted off) 62'
RW	6	Hakan Çalhanoğlu		(substituted off) 46'
LW	10	Arda Turan (c)
CF	17	Burak Yılmaz	(yellow card) 9'
Substitutions:
MF	5	Nuri Şahin		(substituted on) 46'
MF	11	Olcay Şahan		(substituted on) 62'
MF	19	Yunus Mallı		(substituted on) 70'
Manager:
Fatih Terim

Man of the Match:
Andrés Iniesta (Spain)

Assistant referees:
Milovan Ristić (Serbia)
Dalibor Đurđević (Serbia)
Fourth official:
Aleksei Kulbakov (Belarus)
Additional assistant referees:
Danilo Grujić (Serbia)
Nenad Đokić (Serbia)
Reserve assistant referee:
Vitali Maliutsin (Belarus)

=== Czech Republic vs Turkey ===
21 June 2016
21:00

Czech Republic	0–2	Turkey
	Report	Yılmaz 10'; Tufan 65'

Stade Bollaert-Delelis, Lens
Attendance: 32,836
Referee: Willie Collum (Scotland)

Czech Republic	Turkey

GK	1	Petr Čech (c)
RB	2	Pavel Kadeřábek
CB	6	Tomáš Sivok
CB	5	Roman Hubník
LB	11	Daniel Pudil
DM	22	Vladimír Darida
CM	15	David Pavelka	(yellow card) 39'	(substituted off) 57'
CM	13	Jaroslav Plašil	(yellow card) 36'	(substituted off) 90'
RW	9	Bořek Dočkal		(substituted off) 71'
LW	19	Ladislav Krejčí
CF	7	Tomáš Necid
Substitutions:
FW	12	Milan Škoda		(substituted on) 57'
MF	18	Josef Šural	(yellow card) 87'	(substituted on) 71'
MF	14	Daniel Kolář		(substituted on) 90'
Manager:
Pavel Vrba

GK	1	Volkan Babacan
RB	7	Gökhan Gönül
CB	15	Mehmet Topal
CB	3	Hakan Balta	(yellow card) 50'
LB	13	İsmail Köybaşı	(yellow card) 35'
CM	16	Ozan Tufan
CM	8	Selçuk İnan
RW	21	Emre Mor		(substituted off) 69'
AM	10	Arda Turan (c)
LW	20	Volkan Şen		(substituted off) 61'
CF	17	Burak Yılmaz		(substituted off) 90'
Substitutions:
MF	14	Oğuzhan Özyakup		(substituted on) 61'
MF	11	Olcay Şahan		(substituted on) 69'
FW	9	Cenk Tosun		(substituted on) 90'
Manager:
Fatih Terim

Man of the Match:
Burak Yılmaz (Turkey)

Assistant referees:
Damien MacGraith (Republic of Ireland)
Francis Connor (Scotland)
Fourth official:
Sergey Lapochkin (Russia)
Additional assistant referees:
Bobby Madden (Scotland)
John Beaton (Scotland)
Reserve assistant referee:
Nikolai Golubev (Russia)

=== Croatia vs Spain ===
21 June 2016
21:00

Croatia	2–1	Spain
N. Kalinić 45'; Perišić 87'	Report	Morata 7'

Stade de Bordeaux, Bordeaux
Attendance: 37,245
Referee: Björn Kuipers (Netherlands)

Croatia	Spain

GK	23	Danijel Subašić
RB	11	Darijo Srna (c)	(yellow card) 70'
CB	5	Vedran Ćorluka
CB	6	Tin Jedvaj
LB	2	Šime Vrsaljko	(yellow card) 70'
CM	15	Marko Rog	(yellow card) 29'	(substituted off) 82'
CM	19	Milan Badelj
RW	4	Ivan Perišić	(yellow card) 88'	(substituted off) 90+4'
AM	7	Ivan Rakitić
LW	20	Marko Pjaca		(substituted off) 90+2'
CF	16	Nikola Kalinić
Substitutions:
MF	8	Mateo Kovačić		(substituted on) 82'
FW	22	Duje Čop		(substituted on) 90+2'
FW	9	Andrej Kramarić		(substituted on) 90+4'
Manager:
Ante Čačić

GK	13	David de Gea
RB	16	Juanfran
CB	3	Gerard Piqué
CB	15	Sergio Ramos (c)
LB	18	Jordi Alba
DM	5	Sergio Busquets
CM	10	Cesc Fàbregas	(substituted off) 84'
CM	6	Andrés Iniesta
RW	21	David Silva
LW	22	Nolito	(substituted off) 60'
CF	7	Álvaro Morata	(substituted off) 67'
Substitutions:
MF	19	Bruno Soriano	(substituted on) 60'
FW	20	Aritz Aduriz	(substituted on) 67'
MF	14	Thiago	(substituted on) 84'
Manager:
Vicente del Bosque

Man of the Match:
Ivan Perišić (Croatia)

Assistant referees:
Sander van Roekel (Netherlands)
Erwin Zeinstra (Netherlands)
Fourth official:
Viktor Kassai (Hungary)
Additional assistant referees:
Pol van Boekel (Netherlands)
Richard Liesveld (Netherlands)
Reserve assistant referee:
György Ring (Hungary)

== See also ==
- Croatia at the UEFA European Championship
- Czech Republic at the UEFA European Championship
- Spain at the UEFA European Championship
- Turkey at the UEFA European Championship
