= 2014–15 in Azerbaijani football =

24th season of competitive football in Azerbaijan

Football in Azerbaijan
- Season: 2014–15

The 2014-15 season will be the 24th season of competitive association football in Azerbaijan.

== Promotion and relegation ==
=== Pre-season ===
League	Promoted to league	Relegated from league
Premier League	Araz-Naxçıvan PFK	Ravan FK

== National teams ==
=== UEFA Euro 2016 qualifying ===
Pos	Team	Pld	W	D	L	GF	GA	GD	Pts	Qualification	(Italy)	(Croatia)	(Norway)	(Bulgaria)	(Azerbaijan)	(Malta)
1	Italy	10	7	3	0	16	7	+9	24	Qualify for final tournament	—	1–1	2–1	1–0	2–1	1–0
2	Croatia (Note: Croatia were deducted one point after charges for racist behaviour in the home match against Italy.)	10	6	3	1	20	5	+15	20	Qualify for final tournament	1–1	—	5–1	3–0	6–0	2–0
3	Norway	10	6	1	3	13	10	+3	19	Advance to play-offs	0–2	2–0	—	2–1	0–0	2–0
4	Bulgaria	10	3	2	5	9	12	−3	11		2–2	0–1	0–1	—	2–0	1–1
5	Azerbaijan	10	1	3	6	7	18	−11	6		1–3	0–0	0–1	1–2	—	2–0
6	Malta	10	0	2	8	3	16	−13	2		0–1	0–1	0–3	0–1	2–2	—

Source: UEFA
Rules for classification: Qualification tiebreakers
Notes:
9 September 2014
18:00
(21:00 UTC+5)

Azerbaijan	v	Bulgaria
	Report

Tofiq Bahramov Republican Stadium, Baku
10 October 2014
20:45
(20:45 UTC+2)

Italy	v	Azerbaijan
	Report

Stadio Renzo Barbera, Palermo
13 October 2014
20:45
(20:45 UTC+2)

Croatia	v	Azerbaijan
	Report

Stadion Gradski vrt, Osijek
16 November 2014
18:00
(21:00 UTC+4)

Azerbaijan	v	Norway
	Report

Tofiq Bahramov Republican Stadium, Baku
28 March 2015
18:00
(21:00 UTC+4)

Azerbaijan	v	Malta
	Report

Tofiq Bahramov Republican Stadium, Baku
12 June 2015
20:45
(20:45 UTC+2)

Norway	v	Azerbaijan
	Report

Ullevaal Stadion, Oslo
3 September 2015
18:00
(21:00 UTC+5)

Azerbaijan	v	Croatia
	Report

Tofiq Bahramov Republican Stadium, Baku
6 September 2015
18:00
(18:00 UTC+2)

Malta	v	Azerbaijan
	Report

Ta' Qali National Stadium, Ta' Qali
10 October 2015
18:00
(21:00 UTC+5)

Azerbaijan	v	Italy
	Report

Tofiq Bahramov Republican Stadium, Baku
13 October 2015
20:45
(21:45 UTC+3)

Bulgaria	v	Azerbaijan
	Report

Vasil Levski National Stadium, Sofia

=== International Friendlies ===
28 May 2014 Friendly	United States	2 – 0	Azerbaijan	Candlestick Park, San Francisco
07:10 AZST (UTC+5)	Diskerud 75'; Jóhannsson 81'	Summary		Stadium: Candlestick Park; Attendance: 24,688; Referee: Henry Bejarano (Costa Rica)

20 August 2014 Friendly	Azerbaijan	0 – 0	Uzbekistan	Bakcell Arena, Baku
AZST (UTC+5)		Summary		Stadium: Bakcell Arena

3 September 2014 Friendly	Russia	v	Azerbaijan	Moscow, Russia
20:00 AZST (UTC+5)

== League season ==
=== Premier League ===
Pos	Team	Pld	W	D	L	GF	GA	GD	Pts	Qualification
1	Qarabağ (C)	32	20	8	4	51	28	+23	68	Qualification for Champions League second qualifying round
2	Inter Baku	32	17	12	3	55	20	+35	63	Qualification for Europa League first qualifying round
3	Gabala	32	15	9	8	46	35	+11	54	Qualification for Europa League first qualifying round
4	Neftchi Baku	32	13	10	9	38	33	+5	49	Qualification for Europa League first qualifying round
5	Simurq	32	11	6	15	41	39	+2	39	
6	AZAL	32	10	9	13	37	42	−5	39	
7	Khazar Lankaran	32	8	8	16	35	46	−11	32	
8	Sumgayit	32	7	10	15	32	43	−11	31	
9	Baku	32	3	8	21	19	68	−49	17	Relegation to the Azerbaijan First Division
10	Araz-Naxçıvan (Note: Araz-Naxçıvan were officially withdrawn from the league on 17 November 2014)	0	0	0	0	0	0	0	0	Team withdrawn

Source: uefa.com
Rules for classification: 1) points; 2) head-to-head points; 3) head-to-head goal difference; 4) head-to-head goals scored; 5. head-to-head away goals (only if 2 teams are tied); 6) goal difference; 7) goals scored.
(C) Champions

=== First Division ===
Pos	Team	Pld	W	D	L	GF	GA	GD	Pts	Promotion
1	Neftchala	30	25	3	2	83	19	+64	78	
2	Ağsu	30	21	4	5	70	22	+48	67	
3	Ravan Baku (P)	30	21	4	5	70	22	+48	67	Promotion to Azerbaijan Premier League
4	Qaradağ Lökbatan	30	20	5	5	57	25	+32	65	
5	Zira (P)	30	19	6	5	61	19	+42	63	Promotion to Azerbaijan Premier League
6	Turan Tovuz	30	15	5	10	75	37	+38	50	
7	Şahdağ	30	13	8	9	40	29	+11	47	
8	Şuşa Qarabağ	30	14	4	12	49	31	+18	46	
9	Kəpəz (P)	30	10	8	12	37	37	0	38	Promotion to Azerbaijan Premier League
10	Bakili	30	10	4	16	46	61	−15	34	
11	Şəmkir	30	8	8	14	25	46	−21	32	
12	MOIK Baku	30	8	5	17	26	60	−34	29	
13	Mil-Muğan	30	7	5	18	30	65	−35	26	
14	Energetik	30	5	3	22	24	82	−58	18	
15	Göyəzən	30	3	3	24	15	91	−76	12	
16	Lokomotiv-Bilajary	30	3	1	26	10	72	−62	10	

Source: soccerway.com
Rules for classification: 1) points; 2) head-to-head points; 3) head-to-head goal difference; 4) head-to-head goals scored; 5. head-to-head away goals (only if 2 teams are tied); 6) goal difference; 7) goals scored.
(P) Promoted
