= UEFA Euro 2012 Group C =

Football tournament group stage

Group C of UEFA Euro 2012 began on 10 June 2012 and ended on 18 June 2012. The pool consisted of defending (and eventual) champion Spain, Italy, Republic of Ireland and Croatia. The group was jokingly dubbed the "group of debt" by multiple media outlets, in reference to the European sovereign debt crisis facing some of its members. Spain and Italy progressed to the quarter-finals, while Croatia and Republic of Ireland were eliminated from the tournament. Republic of Ireland equalled the worst performance by a team in the group stage of the European Championships, finishing with no points and a goal difference of −8. Both Spain and Italy made it through the quarter-finals and semi-finals to reach the final for a second meeting in the tournament.

In their final match, the Republic of Ireland wore black armbands to commemorate the 18th anniversary of the Loughinisland massacre. This was criticised by some unionists and members of the UVF. However, the victims' families fully supported the gesture.

Spain, Italy, and Croatia were later drawn in Group B of the UEFA Euro 2024; coincidentally, Croatia would be eliminated in the group while Spain would also go on to win the tournament as well; Republic of Ireland did not qualify for this Euro.

== Teams ==
Draw position	Team	Pot	Method of qualification	Date of qualification	Finals appearance	Last appearance	Previous best performance	UEFA Rankings November 2011 (Note: The UEFA rankings of November 2011 were used for seeding for the final draw.)	FIFA Rankings June 2012
C1	Spain	1	Group I winner	6 September 2011	9th	2008	Winners (1964, 2008)	1	1
C2	Italy	2	Group C winner	6 September 2011	8th	2008	Winners (1968)	4	12
C3	Republic of Ireland	4	Play-off winner	15 November 2011	2nd	1988	Group stage (1988)	14	18
C4	Croatia	3	Play-off winner	15 November 2011	4th	2008	Quarter-finals (1996, 2008)	7	8

== Standings ==
Pos	Team	Pld	W	D	L	GF	GA	GD	Pts	Qualification
1	Spain	3	2	1	0	6	1	+5	7	Advance to knockout stage
2	Italy	3	1	2	0	4	2	+2	5	Advance to knockout stage
3	Croatia	3	1	1	1	4	3	+1	4	
4	Republic of Ireland	3	0	0	3	1	9	−8	0	

Source: UEFA
Rules for classification: Group stage tiebreakers

In the quarter-finals,

- The winner of Group C, Spain, advanced to play the runner-up of Group D, France.
- The runner-up of Group C, Italy, advanced to play the winner of Group D, England.

== Matches ==
=== Spain vs Italy ===
10 June 2012
18:00

Spain	1–1	Italy
Fàbregas 64'	Report	Di Natale 61'

PGE Arena, Gdańsk
Attendance: 38,869
Referee: Viktor Kassai (Hungary)

Spain	Italy

GK	1	Iker Casillas (c)
RB	17	Álvaro Arbeloa	(yellow card) 84'
CB	3	Gerard Piqué
CB	15	Sergio Ramos
LB	18	Jordi Alba	(yellow card) 66'
RM	8	Xavi
CM	16	Sergio Busquets
LM	14	Xabi Alonso
RF	21	David Silva		(substituted off) 64'
CF	10	Cesc Fàbregas		(substituted off) 74'
LF	6	Andrés Iniesta
Substitutions:
MF	22	Jesús Navas		(substituted on) 64'
FW	9	Fernando Torres	(yellow card) 84'	(substituted on) 74'
Manager:
Vicente del Bosque

GK	1	Gianluigi Buffon (c)
CB	3	Giorgio Chiellini	(yellow card) 79'
CB	16	Daniele De Rossi
CB	19	Leonardo Bonucci	(yellow card) 66'
RM	13	Emanuele Giaccherini
CM	8	Claudio Marchisio
CM	21	Andrea Pirlo
CM	5	Thiago Motta		(substituted off) 90'
LM	2	Christian Maggio	(yellow card) 89'
CF	10	Antonio Cassano		(substituted off) 65'
CF	9	Mario Balotelli	(yellow card) 37'	(substituted off) 56'
Substitutions:
FW	11	Antonio Di Natale		(substituted on) 56'
FW	20	Sebastian Giovinco		(substituted on) 65'
MF	23	Antonio Nocerino		(substituted on) 90'
Manager:
Cesare Prandelli

Man of the Match:
Andrés Iniesta (Spain)

Assistant referees:
Gábor Erős (Hungary)
György Ring (Hungary)
Fourth official:
William Collum (Scotland)
Additional assistant referees:
István Vad (Hungary)
Tamás Bognár (Hungary)
Reserve assistant referee:
Alasdair Ross (Scotland)

=== Republic of Ireland vs Croatia ===
10 June 2012
20:45

Republic of Ireland	1–3	Croatia
St Ledger 19'	Report	Mandžukić 3', 49'; Jelavić 43'

Stadion Miejski, Poznań
Attendance: 39,550
Referee: Björn Kuipers (Netherlands)

Republic of Ireland	Croatia

GK	1	Shay Given
RB	4	John O'Shea
CB	2	Sean St Ledger
CB	5	Richard Dunne
LB	3	Stephen Ward
CM	6	Glenn Whelan
CM	8	Keith Andrews	(yellow card) 45+1'
RW	7	Aiden McGeady		(substituted off) 54'
LW	11	Damien Duff
CF	9	Kevin Doyle		(substituted off) 53'
CF	10	Robbie Keane (c)		(substituted off) 75'
Substitutions:
FW	14	Jonathan Walters		(substituted on) 53'
FW	20	Simon Cox		(substituted on) 54'
FW	19	Shane Long		(substituted on) 75'
Manager:
(Italy) Giovanni Trapattoni

GK	1	Stipe Pletikosa
RB	11	Darijo Srna (c)
CB	5	Vedran Ćorluka
CB	13	Gordon Schildenfeld
LB	2	Ivan Strinić
DM	8	Ognjen Vukojević
RW	7	Ivan Rakitić		(substituted off) 90+2'
AM	10	Luka Modrić	(yellow card) 53'
LW	20	Ivan Perišić		(substituted off) 89'
CF	17	Mario Mandžukić
CF	9	Nikica Jelavić		(substituted off) 72'
Substitutions:
MF	19	Niko Kranjčar	(yellow card) 84'	(substituted on) 72'
FW	22	Eduardo		(substituted on) 89'
MF	16	Tomislav Dujmović		(substituted on) 90+2'
Manager:
Slaven Bilić

Man of the Match:
Mario Mandžukić (Croatia)

Assistant referees:
Sander van Roekel (Netherlands)
Erwin Zeinstra (Netherlands)
Fourth official:
Viktor Shvetsov (Ukraine)
Additional assistant referees:
Pol van Boekel (Netherlands)
Richard Liesveld (Netherlands)
Reserve assistant referee:
Oleksandr Voytyuk (Ukraine)

=== Italy vs Croatia ===
14 June 2012
18:00

Italy	1–1	Croatia
Pirlo 39'	Report	Mandžukić 72'

Stadion Miejski, Poznań
Attendance: 37,096
Referee: Howard Webb (England)

Italy	Croatia

GK	1	Gianluigi Buffon (c)
CB	19	Leonardo Bonucci
CB	16	Daniele De Rossi
CB	3	Giorgio Chiellini
RWB	2	Christian Maggio
LWB	13	Emanuele Giaccherini
DM	21	Andrea Pirlo
CM	8	Claudio Marchisio
CM	5	Thiago Motta	(yellow card) 56'	(substituted off) 62'
CF	9	Mario Balotelli		(substituted off) 69'
CF	10	Antonio Cassano		(substituted off) 83'
Substitutions:
MF	18	Riccardo Montolivo	(yellow card) 80'	(substituted on) 62'
FW	11	Antonio Di Natale		(substituted on) 69'
FW	20	Sebastian Giovinco		(substituted on) 83'
Manager:
Cesare Prandelli

GK	1	Stipe Pletikosa
RB	11	Darijo Srna (c)
CB	5	Vedran Ćorluka
CB	13	Gordon Schildenfeld	(yellow card) 86'
LB	2	Ivan Strinić
CM	8	Ognjen Vukojević
CM	10	Luka Modrić
RW	7	Ivan Rakitić
LW	20	Ivan Perišić		(substituted off) 68'
CF	9	Nikica Jelavić		(substituted off) 83'
CF	17	Mario Mandžukić		(substituted off) 90+4'
Substitutions:
MF	6	Danijel Pranjić		(substituted on) 68'
FW	22	Eduardo		(substituted on) 83'
MF	19	Niko Kranjčar		(substituted on) 90+4'
Manager:
Slaven Bilić

Man of the Match:
Andrea Pirlo (Italy)

Assistant referees:
Michael Mullarkey (England)
Peter Kirkup (England)
Fourth official:
Pavel Královec (Czech Republic)
Additional assistant referees:
Martin Atkinson (England)
Mark Clattenburg (England)
Reserve assistant referee:
Roman Slyško (Slovakia)

=== Spain vs Republic of Ireland ===
14 June 2012
20:45

Spain	4–0	Republic of Ireland
Torres 4', 70'; Silva 49'; Fàbregas 83'	Report

PGE Arena, Gdańsk
Attendance: 39,150
Referee: Pedro Proença (Portugal)

Spain	Republic of Ireland

GK	1	Iker Casillas (c)
RB	17	Álvaro Arbeloa
CB	3	Gerard Piqué
CB	15	Sergio Ramos
LB	18	Jordi Alba
RM	8	Xavi
CM	16	Sergio Busquets
LM	14	Xabi Alonso	(yellow card) 54'	(substituted off) 65'
RF	21	David Silva
CF	9	Fernando Torres		(substituted off) 74'
LF	6	Andrés Iniesta		(substituted off) 80'
Substitutions:
DF	4	Javi Martínez	(yellow card) 76'	(substituted on) 65'
MF	10	Cesc Fàbregas		(substituted on) 74'
MF	20	Santi Cazorla		(substituted on) 80'
Manager:
Vicente del Bosque

GK	1	Shay Given
RB	4	John O'Shea
CB	2	Sean St Ledger	(yellow card) 84'
CB	5	Richard Dunne
LB	3	Stephen Ward
RM	11	Damien Duff		(substituted off) 76'
CM	8	Keith Andrews
CM	6	Glenn Whelan	(yellow card) 45+1'	(substituted off) 80'
LM	7	Aiden McGeady
CF	20	Simon Cox		(substituted off) 46'
CF	10	Robbie Keane (c)	(yellow card) 36'
Substitutions:
FW	14	Jonathan Walters		(substituted on) 46'
MF	22	James McClean		(substituted on) 76'
MF	21	Paul Green		(substituted on) 80'
Manager:
(Italy) Giovanni Trapattoni

Man of the Match:
Fernando Torres (Spain)

Assistant referees:
Bertino Miranda (Portugal)
Ricardo Santos (Portugal)
Fourth official:
Marcin Borski (Poland)
Additional assistant referees:
Jorge Sousa (Portugal)
Duarte Gomes (Portugal)
Reserve assistant referee:
Marcin Borkowski (Poland)

=== Croatia vs Spain ===
18 June 2012
20:45

Croatia	0–1	Spain
	Report	Navas 88'

PGE Arena, Gdańsk
Attendance: 39,076
Referee: Wolfgang Stark (Germany)

Croatia	Spain

GK	1	Stipe Pletikosa
RB	21	Domagoj Vida		(substituted off) 66'
CB	5	Vedran Ćorluka	(yellow card) 27'
CB	13	Gordon Schildenfeld
LB	2	Ivan Strinić	(yellow card) 53'
CM	8	Ognjen Vukojević		(substituted off) 81'
CM	7	Ivan Rakitić	(yellow card) 90+3'
RW	11	Darijo Srna (c)	(yellow card) 44'
AM	10	Luka Modrić
LW	6	Danijel Pranjić		(substituted off) 66'
CF	17	Mario Mandžukić	(yellow card) 90'
Substitutions:
MF	20	Ivan Perišić		(substituted on) 66'
FW	9	Nikica Jelavić	(yellow card) 90+1'	(substituted on) 66'
FW	22	Eduardo		(substituted on) 81'
Manager:
Slaven Bilić

GK	1	Iker Casillas (c)
RB	17	Álvaro Arbeloa
CB	3	Gerard Piqué
CB	15	Sergio Ramos
LB	18	Jordi Alba
RM	8	Xavi	(substituted off) 89'
CM	16	Sergio Busquets
LM	14	Xabi Alonso
RF	21	David Silva	(substituted off) 73'
CF	9	Fernando Torres	(substituted off) 61'
LF	6	Andrés Iniesta
Substitutions:
MF	22	Jesús Navas	(substituted on) 61'
MF	10	Cesc Fàbregas	(substituted on) 73'
FW	11	Álvaro Negredo	(substituted on) 89'
Manager:
Vicente del Bosque

Man of the Match:
Andrés Iniesta (Spain)

Assistant referees:
Jan-Hendrik Salver (Germany)
Mike Pickel (Germany)
Fourth official:
Richard Liesveld (Netherlands)
Additional assistant referees:
Florian Meyer (Germany)
Deniz Aytekin (Germany)
Reserve assistant referee:
Sander van Roekel (Netherlands)

=== Italy vs Republic of Ireland ===
18 June 2012
20:45

Italy	2–0	Republic of Ireland
Cassano 35'; Balotelli 90'	Report

Stadion Miejski, Poznań
Attendance: 38,794
Referee: Cüneyt Çakır (Turkey)

Italy	Republic of Ireland

GK	1	Gianluigi Buffon (c)	(yellow card) 73'
RB	7	Ignazio Abate
CB	15	Andrea Barzagli
CB	3	Giorgio Chiellini		(substituted off) 57'
LB	6	Federico Balzaretti	(yellow card) 28'
DM	21	Andrea Pirlo
RM	8	Claudio Marchisio
CM	5	Thiago Motta
LM	16	Daniele De Rossi	(yellow card) 71'
CF	11	Antonio Di Natale		(substituted off) 74'
CF	10	Antonio Cassano		(substituted off) 63'
Substitutions:
DF	19	Leonardo Bonucci		(substituted on) 57'
MF	22	Alessandro Diamanti		(substituted on) 63'
FW	9	Mario Balotelli		(substituted on) 74'
Manager:
Cesare Prandelli

GK	1	Shay Given
RB	4	John O'Shea	(yellow card) 39'
CB	5	Richard Dunne
CB	2	Sean St Ledger	(yellow card) 84'
LB	3	Stephen Ward
RM	7	Aiden McGeady		(substituted off) 65'
CM	6	Glenn Whelan
CM	8	Keith Andrews	(yellow card) 37' (yellow-red card) 89'
LM	11	Damien Duff (c)
CF	10	Robbie Keane		(substituted off) 86'
CF	9	Kevin Doyle		(substituted off) 76'
Substitutions:
FW	19	Shane Long		(substituted on) 65'
FW	14	Jonathan Walters		(substituted on) 76'
FW	20	Simon Cox		(substituted on) 86'
Manager:
(Italy) Giovanni Trapattoni

Man of the Match:
Antonio Cassano (Italy)

Assistant referees:
Bahattin Duran (Turkey)
Tarık Ongun (Turkey)
Fourth official:
Viktor Shvetsov (Ukraine)
Additional assistant referees:
Hüseyin Göçek (Turkey)
Bülent Yıldırım (Turkey)
Reserve assistant referee:
Oleksandr Voytyuk (Ukraine)

== See also ==
- Croatia at the UEFA European Championship
- Italy at the UEFA European Championship
- Republic of Ireland at the UEFA European Championship
- Spain at the UEFA European Championship
