= Croatia at the UEFA European Championship =

International football delegation

The UEFA European Championship is one of the major competitive international football tournaments, first played in 1960, whose finals stage has been held every four years.

The Croatia national football team has contested this tournament since 1996. Croatia has qualified for every Euro competition except for the 2000 edition. The team's best performances have been reaching the quarter-finals twice — in 1996 and 2008, losing to Germany and Turkey, respectively.

== Overall record ==
UEFA European Championship record										Qualification record						
Year	Round	Position	Pld	W	D	L	GF	GA	Squad	Position	Pld	W	D	L	GF	GA
(France) 1960 to (Sweden) 1992	Part of Yugoslavia									Part of Yugoslavia						
(England) 1996	Quarter-finals	7th	4	2	0	2	5	5	Squad	1st	10	7	2	1	22	5
(Belgium) (Netherlands) 2000	Did not qualify									3rd	8	4	3	1	13	9
(Portugal) 2004	Group stage	13th	3	0	2	1	4	6	Squad	2nd	10	6	2	2	14	5
(Austria) (Switzerland) 2008	Quarter-finals	5th	4	3	1	0	5	2	Squad	1st	12	9	2	1	28	8
(Poland) (Ukraine) 2012	Group stage	10th	3	1	1	1	4	3	Squad	2nd	12	8	2	2	21	7
(France) 2016	Round of 16	9th	4	2	1	1	5	4	Squad	2nd	10	6	3	1	20	5
(Europe) 2020	Round of 16	14th	4	1	1	2	7	8	Squad	1st	8	5	2	1	17	7
(Germany) 2024	Group stage	20th	3	0	2	1	3	6	Squad	2nd	8	5	1	2	13	4
(United Kingdom) (Republic of Ireland) 2028	To be determined									To be determined						
(Italy) (Turkey) 2032	To be determined									To be determined						
Total	Quarter-finals	7/8	25	9	8	8	33	34	–	–	78	50	17	11	148	50

*Draws include knockout matches decided via penalty shoot-out.

Croatia's European Championship record
First Match	Turkey 0–1 Croatia (11 June 1996; Nottingham, England)
Biggest Win	Croatia 3–0 Denmark (16 June 1996; Sheffield, England)
Biggest Defeat	Croatia 0–3 Portugal (19 June 1996; Nottingham, England); Spain 3–0 Croatia (15 June 2024; Berlin, Germany)
Best Result	Quarter-finals in 1996 and 2008
Worst Result	Group stage in 2004, 2012 and 2024

== UEFA Euro 1996 ==
=== Qualifying ===
Pos	Team	Pld	W	D	L	GF	GA	GD	Pts	Qualification	(Croatia)	(Italy)	(Lithuania)	(Ukraine)	(Slovenia)	(Estonia)
1	Croatia	10	7	2	1	22	5	+17	23 (Note: Head-to-head points: Croatia 4, Italy 1.)	Qualify for final tournament	—	1–1	2–0	4–0	2–0	7–1
2	Italy	10	7	2	1	20	6	+14	23	Qualify for final tournament	1–2	—	4–0	3–1	1–0	4–1
3	Lithuania	10	5	1	4	13	12	+1	16		0–0	0–1	—	1–3	2–1	5–0
4	Ukraine	10	4	1	5	11	15	−4	13		1–0	0–2	0–2	—	0–0	3–0
5	Slovenia	10	3	2	5	13	13	0	11		1–2	1–1	1–2	3–2	—	3–0
6	Estonia	10	0	0	10	3	31	−28	0		0–2	0–2	0–1	0–1	1–3	—

=== Group stage ===

Croatia's 3-5-2 lineup in the Euro 1996

Pos	Team	Pld	W	D	L	GF	GA	GD	Pts	Qualification
1	Portugal	3	2	1	0	5	1	+4	7	Advance to knockout stage
2	Croatia	3	2	0	1	4	3	+1	6	Advance to knockout stage
3	Denmark	3	1	1	1	4	4	0	4	
4	Turkey	3	0	0	3	0	5	−5	0	

Source: UEFA
Rules for classification: Group stage tiebreakers
11 June 1996
19:30

Turkey	0–1	Croatia
	Report	Vlaović 86'

City Ground, Nottingham
Attendance: 22,460
Referee: Serge Muhmenthaler (Switzerland)

16 June 1996
18:00

Croatia	3–0	Denmark
Šuker 54' (pen.), 90'; Boban 81'	Report

Hillsborough, Sheffield
Attendance: 33,671
Referee: Marc Batta (France)

19 June 1996
16:30

Croatia	0–3	Portugal
	Report	Figo 4'; João Pinto 33'; Domingos 82'

City Ground, Nottingham
Attendance: 20,484
Referee: Bernd Heynemann (Germany)

=== Knockout stage ===
Quarter-finals

23 June 1996
15:00

Germany	2–1	Croatia
Klinsmann 20' (pen.); Sammer 59'	Report	Šuker 51'

Old Trafford, Manchester
Attendance: 43,412
Referee: Leif Sundell (Sweden)

== UEFA Euro 2004 ==
=== Qualifying ===
Pos	Team	Pld	W	D	L	GF	GA	GD	Pts	Qualification	(Bulgaria)	(Croatia)	(Belgium)	(Estonia)	(Andorra)
1	Bulgaria	8	5	2	1	13	4	+9	17	Qualify for final tournament	—	2–0	2–2	2–0	2–1
2	Croatia	8	5	1	2	12	4	+8	16 (Note: Tied on head-to-head points (3). Head-to-head goal difference: Croatia +3, Belgium −3.)	Advance to play-offs	1–0	—	4–0	0–0	2–0
3	Belgium	8	5	1	2	11	9	+2	16		0–2	2–1	—	2–0	3–0
4	Estonia	8	2	2	4	4	6	−2	8		0–0	0–1	0–1	—	2–0
5	Andorra	8	0	0	8	1	18	−17	0		0–3	0–3	0–1	0–2	—

Source: UEFA
Notes:

Play-offs

15 November 2003
17:30 UTC+1

Croatia	1–1	Slovenia
Pršo 5'	Report	Šiljak 22'

Maksimir Stadion, Zagreb
Attendance: 34,657
Referee: Markus Merk (Germany)
19 November 2003
17:30 UTC+1

Slovenia	0–1	Croatia
	Report	Pršo 61'

Bežigrad Stadium, Ljubljana
Attendance: 8,500
Referee: Urs Meier (Switzerland)

Croatia won 2–1 on aggregate and qualified for UEFA Euro 2004.

=== Group stage ===

Croatia's 4-4-2 lineup in the Euro 2004

Pos	Team	Pld	W	D	L	GF	GA	GD	Pts	Qualification
1	France	3	2	1	0	7	4	+3	7	Advance to knockout stage
2	England	3	2	0	1	8	4	+4	6	Advance to knockout stage
3	Croatia	3	0	2	1	4	6	−2	2	
4	Switzerland	3	0	1	2	1	6	−5	1	

Source: UEFA
Rules for classification: Group stage tiebreakers
13 June 2004
17:00

Switzerland	0–0	Croatia
	Report

Estádio Dr. Magalhães Pessoa, Leiria
Attendance: 24,090
Referee: Lucílio Batista (Portugal)

17 June 2004
19:45

Croatia	2–2	France
Rapaić 48' (pen.); Pršo 52'	Report	Tudor 22' (o.g.); Trezeguet 64'

Estádio Dr. Magalhães Pessoa, Leiria
Attendance: 29,160
Referee: Kim Milton Nielsen (Denmark)

21 June 2004
19:45

Croatia	2–4	England
N. Kovač 5'; Tudor 73'	Report	Scholes 40'; Rooney 45+1', 68'; Lampard 79'

Estádio da Luz, Lisbon
Attendance: 57,047
Referee: Pierluigi Collina (Italy)

== UEFA Euro 2008 ==
=== Qualifying ===
In the qualifiers, Croatia was drawn into Group E of Euro 2008's qualifications, along with Andorra, England, Estonia, Macedonia, Israel and Russia.

Over the course of qualifying, Croatia racked up nine wins, two draws, and one loss. Croatia's loss was a 2–0 defeat at Skopje, Macedonia. Croatia and Romania became the final teams to record their first loss, both on the 17 November 2007 matchday, in a qualification cycle where every team suffered at least one defeat. Croatia gathered numerous headlines after knocking England out on the final matchday, with a 3–2 victory at Wembley Stadium.

Croatian striker Eduardo was the second-highest goalscorer in qualifications with ten goals, trailing Northern Ireland's David Healy.

Pos	Team	Pld	W	D	L	GF	GA	GD	Pts	Qualification	(Croatia)	(Russia)	(England)	(Israel)	(North Macedonia)	(Estonia)	(Andorra)
1	Croatia	12	9	2	1	28	8	+20	29	Qualify for final tournament	—	0–0	2–0	1–0	2–1	2–0	7–0
2	Russia	12	7	3	2	18	7	+11	24	Qualify for final tournament	0–0	—	2–1	1–1	3–0	2–0	4–0
3	England	12	7	2	3	24	7	+17	23 (Note: Head-to-head points: England 4, Israel 1.)		2–3	3–0	—	3–0	0–0	3–0	5–0
4	Israel	12	7	2	3	20	12	+8	23		3–4	2–1	0–0	—	1–0	4–0	4–1
5	North Macedonia	12	4	2	6	12	12	0	14		2–0	0–2	0–1	1–2	—	1–1	3–0
6	Estonia	12	2	1	9	5	21	−16	7		0–1	0–2	0–3	0–1	0–1	—	2–1
7	Andorra	12	0	0	12	2	42	−40	0		0–6	0–1	0–3	0–2	0–3	0–2	—

=== Group stage ===

Croatia's 4-4-2 lineup in the Euro 2008

Pos	Team	Pld	W	D	L	GF	GA	GD	Pts	Qualification
1	Croatia	3	3	0	0	4	1	+3	9	Advance to knockout stage
2	Germany	3	2	0	1	4	2	+2	6	Advance to knockout stage
3	Austria (H)	3	0	1	2	1	3	−2	1 (Note: Tied on head-to-head result (Austria 1–1 Poland). Overall goal difference was used as the tiebreaker.)	
4	Poland	3	0	1	2	1	4	−3	1	

Source: UEFA
Rules for classification: Group stage tiebreakers
(H) Hosts
Notes:
8 June 2008
18:00

Austria	0–1	Croatia
	Report	Modrić 4' (pen.)

Ernst-Happel-Stadion, Vienna
Attendance: 51,428
Referee: Pieter Vink (Netherlands)

12 June 2008
18:00

Croatia	2–1	Germany
Srna 24'; Olić 62'	Report	Podolski 79'

Wörthersee Stadion, Klagenfurt
Attendance: 30,461
Referee: Frank De Bleeckere (Belgium)

16 June 2008
20:45

Poland	0–1	Croatia
	Report	Klasnić 53'

Wörthersee Stadion, Klagenfurt
Attendance: 30,461
Referee: Kyros Vassaras (Greece)

=== Knockout stage ===
Quarter-finals

20 June 2008
20:45

Croatia	1–1 (a.e.t.)	Turkey
Klasnić 119'	Report	Şentürk 120+2'
Penalties
Modrić (penalty missed); Srna (penalty scored); Rakitić (penalty missed); Petrić (penalty missed)	1–3	(penalty scored) Turan; (penalty scored) Şentürk; (penalty scored) Altıntop

Ernst-Happel-Stadion, Vienna
Attendance: 51,428
Referee: Roberto Rosetti (Italy)

== UEFA Euro 2012 ==
=== Qualifying ===
Pos	Team	Pld	W	D	L	GF	GA	GD	Pts	Qualification	(Greece)	(Croatia)	(Israel)	(Latvia)	(Georgia (country))	(Malta)
1	Greece	10	7	3	0	14	5	+9	24	Qualify for final tournament	—	2–0	2–1	1–0	1–1	3–1
2	Croatia	10	7	1	2	18	7	+11	22	Advance to play-offs	0–0	—	3–1	2–0	2–1	3–0
3	Israel	10	5	1	4	13	11	+2	16		0–1	1–2	—	2–1	1–0	3–1
4	Latvia	10	3	2	5	9	12	−3	11		1–1	0–3	1–2	—	1–1	2–0
5	Georgia	10	2	4	4	7	9	−2	10		1–2	1–0	0–0	0–1	—	1–0
6	Malta	10	0	1	9	4	21	−17	1		0–1	1–3	0–2	0–2	1–1	—

Source: UEFA

Play-offs

11 November 2011
21:05 UTC+2

Turkey	0–3	Croatia
	Report	Olić 2'; Mandžukić 32'; Ćorluka 51'

Türk Telekom Arena, Istanbul
Attendance: 42,863
Referee: Felix Brych (Germany)
15 November 2011
20:05 UTC+1

Croatia	0–0	Turkey
	Report

Maksimir Stadium, Zagreb
Attendance: 26,371
Referee: Pedro Proença (Portugal)

Croatia won 3–0 on aggregate and qualified for UEFA Euro 2012.

=== Group stage ===

Croatia's 4-4-2 lineup in the Euro 2012

Pos	Team	Pld	W	D	L	GF	GA	GD	Pts	Qualification
1	Spain	3	2	1	0	6	1	+5	7	Advance to knockout stage
2	Italy	3	1	2	0	4	2	+2	5	Advance to knockout stage
3	Croatia	3	1	1	1	4	3	+1	4	
4	Republic of Ireland	3	0	0	3	1	9	−8	0	

Source: UEFA
Rules for classification: Group stage tiebreakers
10 June 2012
20:45 CEST

Republic of Ireland	1–3	Croatia
St Ledger 19'	Report	Mandžukić 3', 49'; Jelavić 43'

Stadion Miejski, Poznań
Attendance: 39,550
Referee: Björn Kuipers (Netherlands)

14 June 2012
18:00 CEST

Italy	1–1	Croatia
Pirlo 39'	Report	Mandžukić 72'

Stadion Miejski, Poznań
Attendance: 37,096
Referee: Howard Webb (England)

18 June 2012
20:45 CEST

Croatia	0–1	Spain
	Report	Navas 88'

PGE Arena, Gdańsk
Attendance: 39,076
Referee: Wolfgang Stark (Germany)

== UEFA Euro 2016 ==
=== Qualifying ===
Pos	Team	Pld	W	D	L	GF	GA	GD	Pts	Qualification	(Italy)	(Croatia)	(Norway)	(Bulgaria)	(Azerbaijan)	(Malta)
1	Italy	10	7	3	0	16	7	+9	24	Qualify for final tournament	—	1–1	2–1	1–0	2–1	1–0
2	Croatia (Note: Croatia were deducted one point after charges for racist behaviour in the home match against Italy.)	10	6	3	1	20	5	+15	20	Qualify for final tournament	1–1	—	5–1	3–0	6–0	2–0
3	Norway	10	6	1	3	13	10	+3	19	Advance to play-offs	0–2	2–0	—	2–1	0–0	2–0
4	Bulgaria	10	3	2	5	9	12	−3	11		2–2	0–1	0–1	—	2–0	1–1
5	Azerbaijan	10	1	3	6	7	18	−11	6		1–3	0–0	0–1	1–2	—	2–0
6	Malta	10	0	2	8	3	16	−13	2		0–1	0–1	0–3	0–1	2–2	—

Source: UEFA

=== Group stage ===

Croatia's 4-2-3-1 lineup in the Euro 2016

Pos	Team	Pld	W	D	L	GF	GA	GD	Pts	Qualification
1	Croatia	3	2	1	0	5	3	+2	7	Advance to knockout stage
2	Spain	3	2	0	1	5	2	+3	6	Advance to knockout stage
3	Turkey	3	1	0	2	2	4	−2	3	
4	Czech Republic	3	0	1	2	2	5	−3	1	

Source: UEFA
Rules for classification: Group stage tiebreakers
12 June 2016
15:00

Turkey	0–1	Croatia
	Report	Modrić 41'

Parc des Princes, Paris
Attendance: 43,842
Referee: Jonas Eriksson (Sweden)

17 June 2016
18:00

Czech Republic	2–2	Croatia
Škoda 76'; Necid 89' (pen.)	Report	Perišić 37'; Rakitić 59'

Stade Geoffroy-Guichard, Saint-Étienne
Attendance: 38,376
Referee: Mark Clattenburg (England)

21 June 2016
21:00

Croatia	2–1	Spain
N. Kalinić 45'; Perišić 87'	Report	Morata 7'

Stade de Bordeaux, Bordeaux
Attendance: 37,245
Referee: Björn Kuipers (Netherlands)

=== Knockout stage ===
Round of 16

25 June 2016
21:00

Croatia	0–1 (a.e.t.)	Portugal
	Report	Quaresma 117'

Stade Bollaert-Delelis, Lens
Attendance: 33,523
Referee: Carlos Velasco Carballo (Spain)

== UEFA Euro 2020 ==
=== Qualifying ===
Pos	Team	Pld	W	D	L	GF	GA	GD	Pts	Qualification	(Croatia)	(Wales)	(Slovakia)	(Hungary)	(Azerbaijan)
1	Croatia	8	5	2	1	17	7	+10	17	Qualify for final tournament	—	2–1	3–1	3–0	2–1
2	Wales	8	4	2	2	10	6	+4	14	Qualify for final tournament	1–1	—	1–0	2–0	2–1
3	Slovakia	8	4	1	3	13	11	+2	13	Advance to play-offs via Nations League	0–4	1–1	—	2–0	2–0
4	Hungary	8	4	0	4	8	11	−3	12	Advance to play-offs via Nations League	2–1	1–0	1–2	—	1–0
5	Azerbaijan	8	0	1	7	5	18	−13	1		1–1	0–2	1–5	1–3	—

Source: UEFA

=== Group stage ===

Croatia's 4-2-3-1 lineup in the Euro 2020

Pos	Team	Pld	W	D	L	GF	GA	GD	Pts	Qualification
1	England (H)	3	2	1	0	2	0	+2	7	Advance to knockout stage
2	Croatia	3	1	1	1	4	3	+1	4 (Note: Tied on head-to-head result (Croatia 1–1 Czech Republic) and overall goal difference (+1). Overall goals for was used as the tiebreaker.)	Advance to knockout stage
3	Czech Republic	3	1	1	1	3	2	+1	4	Advance to knockout stage
4	Scotland (H)	3	0	1	2	1	5	−4	1	

Source: UEFA
Rules for classification: Group stage tiebreakers
(H) Hosts
Notes:
13 June 2021
15:00 (14:00 UTC+1)

England	1–0	Croatia
Sterling 57'	Report

Wembley Stadium, London
Attendance: 18,497
Referee: Daniele Orsato (Italy)

18 June 2021
18:00 (17:00 UTC+1)

Croatia	1–1	Czech Republic
Perišić 47'	Report	Schick 37' (pen.)

Hampden Park, Glasgow
Attendance: 5,607
Referee: Carlos del Cerro Grande (Spain)

22 June 2021
21:00 (20:00 UTC+1)

Croatia	3–1	Scotland
Vlašić 17'; Modrić 62'; Perišić 77'	Report	McGregor 42'

Hampden Park, Glasgow
Attendance: 9,896
Referee: Fernando Rapallini (Argentina)

=== Knockout stage ===
Round of 16

28 June 2021
18:00

Croatia	3–5 (a.e.t.)	Spain
Pedri 20' (o.g.); Oršić 85'; Pašalić 90+2'	Report	Sarabia 38'; Azpilicueta 57'; F. Torres 77'; Morata 100'; Oyarzabal 103'

Parken Stadium, Copenhagen
Attendance: 22,771
Referee: Cüneyt Çakır (Turkey)

== UEFA Euro 2024 ==
=== Qualifying ===
Pos	Team	Pld	W	D	L	GF	GA	GD	Pts	Qualification	(Turkey)	(Croatia)	(Wales)	(Armenia)	(Latvia)
1	Turkey	8	5	2	1	14	7	+7	17	Qualify for final tournament	—	0–2	2–0	1–1	4–0
2	Croatia	8	5	1	2	13	4	+9	16	Qualify for final tournament	0–1	—	1–1	1–0	5–0
3	Wales	8	3	3	2	10	10	0	12	Advance to play-offs via Nations League	1–1	2–1	—	2–4	1–0
4	Armenia	8	2	2	4	9	11	−2	8		1–2	0–1	1–1	—	2–1
5	Latvia	8	1	0	7	5	19	−14	3		2–3	0–2	0–2	2–0	—

Source: UEFA

=== Group stage ===

Croatia's 4-5-1 lineup in the Euro 2024

Pos	Team	Pld	W	D	L	GF	GA	GD	Pts	Qualification
1	Spain	3	3	0	0	5	0	+5	9	Advance to knockout stage
2	Italy	3	1	1	1	3	3	0	4	Advance to knockout stage
3	Croatia	3	0	2	1	3	6	−3	2	
4	Albania	3	0	1	2	3	5	−2	1	

Source: UEFA
Rules for classification: Group stage tiebreakers
15 June 2024
18:00

Spain	3–0	Croatia
Morata 29'; Fabián 32'; Carvajal 45+2'	Report

Olympiastadion, Berlin
Attendance: 68,844
Referee: Michael Oliver (England)

19 June 2024
15:00

Croatia	2–2	Albania
Kramarić 74'; Gjasula 76' (o.g.)	Report	Laçi 11'; Gjasula 90+5'

Volksparkstadion, Hamburg
Attendance: 46,784
Referee: François Letexier (France)

24 June 2024
21:00

Croatia	1–1	Italy
Modrić 55'	Report	Zaccagni 90+8'

Red Bull Arena, Leipzig
Attendance: 38,322
Referee: Danny Makkelie (Netherlands)

Ranking of third-placed teams

Pos	Grp	Team	Pld	W	D	L	GF	GA	GD	Pts	Qualification
1	D	Netherlands	3	1	1	1	4	4	0	4 (Note: Disciplinary points: Netherlands −2, Georgia −6.)	Advance to knockout stage
2	F	Georgia	3	1	1	1	4	4	0	4	Advance to knockout stage
3	E	Slovakia	3	1	1	1	3	3	0	4	Advance to knockout stage
4	C	Slovenia	3	0	3	0	2	2	0	3	Advance to knockout stage
5	A	Hungary	3	1	0	2	2	5	−3	3	
6	B	Croatia	3	0	2	1	3	6	−3	2	

Source: UEFA
Rules for classification: 1) Points; 2) Goal difference; 3) Goals scored; 4) Wins; 5) Lower disciplinary points total; 6) European Qualifiers overall ranking (or drawing of lots, if hosts Germany had been involved in the tiebreaker).

== List of matches ==
Year	Round	Opponent	Score	Result	Venue	Croatia scorers
(England) 1996	Group stage	Turkey	1–0	W	Nottingham	Vlaović
(England) 1996	Group stage	Denmark	3–0	W	Sheffield	Šuker (2), Boban
(England) 1996	Group stage	Portugal	0–3	L	Nottingham	—
(England) 1996	Quarter-finals	Germany	1–2	L	Manchester	Šuker
(Portugal) 2004	Group stage	Switzerland	0–0	D	Leiria	—
(Portugal) 2004	Group stage	France	2–2	D	Leiria	Rapaić, Pršo
(Portugal) 2004	Group stage	England	2–4	L	Lisbon	N. Kovač, Tudor
(Austria) (Switzerland) 2008	Group stage	Austria	1–0	W	Vienna	Modrić
(Austria) (Switzerland) 2008	Group stage	Germany	2–1	W	Klagenfurt	Srna, Olić
(Austria) (Switzerland) 2008	Group stage	Poland	1–0	W	Klagenfurt	Klasnić
(Austria) (Switzerland) 2008	Quarter-finals	Turkey	1–1 (a.e.t.) (1–3 p)	D	Vienna	Klasnić
(Poland) (Ukraine) 2012	Group stage	Republic of Ireland	3–1	W	Poznań	Mandžukić (2), Jelavić
(Poland) (Ukraine) 2012	Group stage	Italy	1–1	D	Poznań	Mandžukić
(Poland) (Ukraine) 2012	Group stage	Spain	0–1	L	Gdańsk	—
(France) 2016	Group stage	Turkey	1–0	W	Paris	Modrić
(France) 2016	Group stage	Czech Republic	2–2	D	Saint-Étienne	Perišić, Rakitić
(France) 2016	Group stage	Spain	2–1	W	Bordeaux	Kalinić, Perišić
(France) 2016	Round of 16	Portugal	0–1 (a.e.t.)	L	Lens	—
(Europe) 2020	Group stage	England	0–1	L	London	—
(Europe) 2020	Group stage	Czech Republic	1–1	D	Glasgow	Perišić
(Europe) 2020	Group stage	Scotland	3–1	W	Glasgow	Vlašić, Modrić, Perišić
(Europe) 2020	Round of 16	Spain	3–5 (a.e.t.)	L	Copenhagen	Pedri (o.g.), Oršić, Pašalić
(Germany) 2024	Group stage	Spain	0–3	L	Berlin	—
(Germany) 2024	Group stage	Albania	2–2	D	Hamburg	Kramarić, Gjasula (o.g.)
(Germany) 2024	Group stage	Italy	1–1	D	Leipzig	Modrić

=== By opponent ===
Opponent	Pld	W	D	L	GF	GA	GD
Albania	1	0	1	0	2	2	0
Austria	1	1	0	0	1	0	+1
Czech Republic	2	0	2	0	3	3	0
Denmark	1	1	0	0	3	0	+3
England	2	0	0	2	2	5	-3
France	1	0	1	0	2	2	0
Germany	2	1	0	1	3	3	0
Italy	2	0	2	0	2	2	0
Poland	1	1	0	0	1	0	+1
Portugal	2	0	0	2	0	4	-4
Republic of Ireland	1	1	0	0	3	1	+2
Scotland	1	1	0	0	3	1	+2
Spain	4	1	0	3	5	10	−5
Switzerland	1	0	1	0	0	0	0
Turkey	3	2	1	0	3	1	+2

== Player records ==
=== Most appearances ===
Rank	Player	Matches	Years
1	Luka Modrić	16	2008, 2012, 2016, 2020, 2024
2	Ivan Perišić	13	2012, 2016, 2020, 2024
3	Darijo Srna	12	2004, 2008, 2012, 2016
4	Vedran Ćorluka	11	2008, 2012, 2016
5	Ivan Rakitić	10	2008, 2012, 2016
5	Marcelo Brozović	10	2016, 2020, 2024
5	Andrej Kramarić	10	2016, 2020, 2024

=== Goal scorers ===
Rank	Player	Goals	Years (goals)
1	Luka Modrić	4	2008, 2016, 2020, 2024
1	Ivan Perišić	4	2016 (2), 2020 (2)
3	Davor Šuker	3	1996
3	Mario Mandžukić	3	2012
5	Ivan Klasnić	2	2008
6	Zvonimir Boban	1	1996
6	Goran Vlaović	1	1996
6	Niko Kovač	1	2004
6	Dado Pršo	1	2004
6	Milan Rapaić	1	2004
6	Igor Tudor	1	2004
6	Ivica Olić	1	2008
6	Darijo Srna	1	2008
6	Nikica Jelavić	1	2012
6	Nikola Kalinić	1	2016
6	Ivan Rakitić	1	2016
6	Nikola Vlašić	1	2020
6	Mislav Oršić	1	2020
6	Mario Pašalić	1	2020
6	Andrej Kramarić	1	2024

== Awards ==
- Team of the Tournament: Davor Šuker (1996), Luka Modrić (2008)
- With three goals, Mario Mandžukić was the joint-top scorer in 2012 alongside five other players, but did not win an award.

== See also ==
- Croatia at the FIFA World Cup
- Croatia in the UEFA Nations League
