= UEFA Euro 1996 Group D =

Football tournament group stage

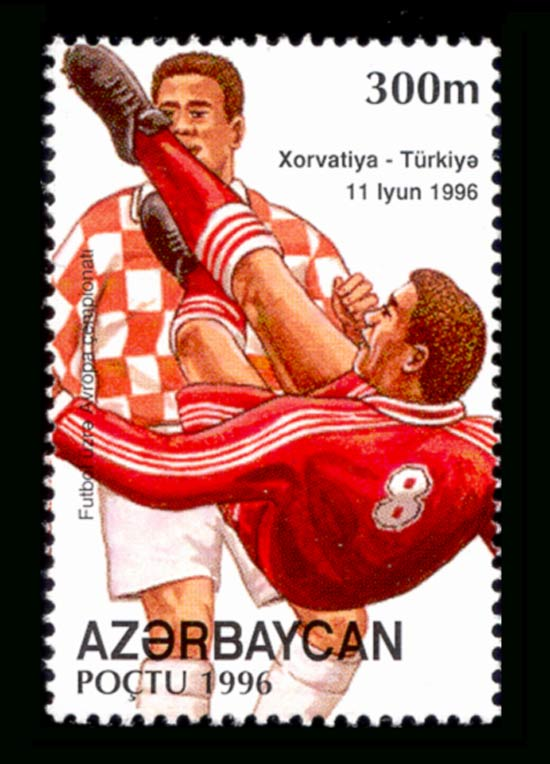
1996 Azeri postage stamp depicting the Group D game between Croatia versus Turkey on 11 June

Group D of UEFA Euro 1996 was one of four groups in the final tournament's initial group stage. It began on 9 June and was completed on 19 June. The group consisted of defending champions Denmark, Portugal, Croatia and Turkey.

Portugal won the group and advanced to the quarter-finals along with Croatia. Denmark and Turkey failed to advance.

== Teams ==
Draw position	Team	Method of qualification	Date of qualification	Finals appearance	Last appearance	Previous best performance	FIFA Rankings May 1996
D1 (seed)	Denmark	Group 2 runner-up (5th best runner-up)	15 November 1995	5th	1992	Winners (1992)	11
D2	Portugal	Group 6 winner	15 November 1995	2nd	1984	Semi-finals (1984)	18
D3	Turkey	Group 3 runner-up (3rd best runner-up)	15 November 1995	1st	—	Debut	30
D4	Croatia	Group 4 winner	15 November 1995	1st	—	Debut	27

== Standings ==
Pos	Team	Pld	W	D	L	GF	GA	GD	Pts	Qualification
1	Portugal	3	2	1	0	5	1	+4	7	Advance to knockout stage
2	Croatia	3	2	0	1	4	3	+1	6	Advance to knockout stage
3	Denmark	3	1	1	1	4	4	0	4	
4	Turkey	3	0	0	3	0	5	−5	0	

Source: UEFA
Rules for classification: Group stage tiebreakers

In the quarter-finals,

- The winner of Group D, Portugal, advanced to play the runner-up of Group C, Czech Republic.
- The runner-up of Group D, Croatia, advanced to play the winner of Group C, Germany.

== Matches ==
=== Denmark vs Portugal ===
9 June 1996
19:30

Denmark	1–1	Portugal
B. Laudrup 22'	Report	Sá Pinto 53'

Hillsborough, Sheffield
Attendance: 34,993
Referee: Mario van der Ende (Netherlands)

Denmark	Portugal

GK	1	Peter Schmeichel
RB	2	Thomas Helveg	(yellow card) 30'
CB	3	Marc Rieper
CB	5	Jes Høgh
LB	14	Jens Risager	(yellow card) 14'
DM	8	Claus Thomsen		(substituted off) 83'
RM	9	Mikkel Beck
CM	10	Michael Laudrup (c)
CM	13	Henrik Larsen		(substituted off) 90'
LM	7	Brian Steen Nielsen
CF	11	Brian Laudrup
Substitutions:
DF	12	Torben Piechnik		(substituted on) 83'
MF	18	Kim Vilfort		(substituted on) 90'
Manager:
Richard Møller Nielsen

GK	1	Vítor Baía (c)
RB	3	Paulinho Santos	(yellow card) 9'
CB	16	Hélder Cristóvão
CB	5	Fernando Couto
LB	13	Dimas Teixeira
CM	4	Oceano Cruz	(yellow card) 24'	(substituted off) 37'
CM	19	Paulo Sousa	(yellow card) 58'	(substituted off) 79'
RW	20	Luís Figo		(substituted off) 62'
AM	10	Rui Costa
LW	8	João Pinto	(yellow card) 73'
CF	9	Sá Pinto	(yellow card) 41'
Substitutions:
MF	18	António Folha		(substituted on) 37'
FW	15	Domingos		(substituted on) 62'
MF	6	José Tavares		(substituted on) 79'
Manager:
António Oliveira

Man of the Match:
Peter Schmeichel (Denmark)

Assistant referees:
Jan Dolstra (Netherlands)
Berend Talens (Netherlands)
Fourth official:
René Temmink (Netherlands)

=== Turkey vs Croatia ===
11 June 1996
19:30

Turkey	0–1	Croatia
	Report	Vlaović 86'

City Ground, Nottingham
Attendance: 22,460
Referee: Serge Muhmenthaler (Switzerland)

Turkey	Croatia

GK	22	Rüştü Reçber
SW	13	Rahim Zafer
CB	4	Vedat İnceefe
CB	8	Ogün Temizkanoğlu (c)
CB	3	Alpay Özalan
RM	18	Arif Erdem		(substituted off) 82'
CM	5	Tugay Kerimoğlu
CM	19	Tolunay Kafkas	(yellow card) 31'	(substituted off) 89'
LM	17	Abdullah Ercan
AM	16	Sergen Yalçın
CF	9	Hakan Şükür
Substitutions:
FW	7	Hami Mandıralı		(substituted on) 82'
FW	14	Saffet Sancaklı		(substituted on) 89'
Manager:
Fatih Terim

GK	1	Dražen Ladić
RB	13	Mario Stanić
CB	4	Igor Štimac
CB	6	Slaven Bilić
LB	3	Robert Jarni
DM	5	Nikola Jerkan
RM	8	Robert Prosinečki
CM	7	Aljoša Asanović	(yellow card) 40'
LM	10	Zvonimir Boban (c)	(yellow card) 55'	(substituted off) 57'
SS	11	Alen Bokšić		(substituted off) 73'
CF	9	Davor Šuker		(substituted off) 90'
Substitutions:
MF	14	Zvonimir Soldo		(substituted on) 57'
FW	19	Goran Vlaović		(substituted on) 73'
DF	15	Dubravko Pavličić		(substituted on) 90'
Manager:
Miroslav Blaževic

Man of the Match:
Robert Prosinečki (Croatia)

Assistant referees:
Ernst Felder (Switzerland)
Martin Freiburghaus (Switzerland)
Fourth official:
Urs Meier (Switzerland)

=== Portugal vs Turkey ===
14 June 1996
16:30

Portugal	1–0	Turkey
Couto 66'	Report

City Ground, Nottingham
Attendance: 22,670
Referee: Sándor Puhl (Hungary)

Portugal	Turkey

GK	1	Vítor Baía (c)
RB	3	Paulinho Santos	(yellow card) 2'
CB	16	Hélder Cristóvão
CB	5	Fernando Couto
LB	13	Dimas Teixeira
DM	19	Paulo Sousa
RM	20	Luís Figo	(yellow card) 58'
LM	18	António Folha		(substituted off) 46'
AM	10	Rui Costa
CF	8	João Pinto		(substituted off) 77'
CF	9	Sá Pinto		(substituted off) 65'
Substitutions:
MF	6	José Tavares	(yellow card) 72'	(substituted on) 46'
FW	11	Jorge Cadete		(substituted on) 65'
MF	17	Hugo Porfírio		(substituted on) 77'
Manager:
António Oliveira

GK	22	Rüştü Reçber
RB	4	Vedat İnceefe	(yellow card) 65'
CB	8	Ogün Temizkanoğlu		(substituted off) 46'
CB	5	Tugay Kerimoğlu
LB	3	Alpay Özalan
CM	2	Recep Çetin
CM	10	Oğuz Çetin (c)		(substituted off) 69'
CM	17	Abdullah Ercan	(yellow card) 43'
AM	16	Sergen Yalçın
CF	14	Saffet Sancaklı		(substituted off) 63'
CF	9	Hakan Şükür
Substitutions:
DF	13	Rahim Zafer	(yellow card) 73'	(substituted on) 46'
MF	19	Tolunay Kafkas	(yellow card) 76'	(substituted on) 63'
FW	18	Arif Erdem		(substituted on) 69'
Manager:
Fatih Terim

Man of the Match:
Fernando Couto (Portugal)

Assistant referees:
László Hamar (Hungary)
Imre Bozóky (Hungary)
Fourth official:
Sándor Piller (Hungary)

=== Croatia vs Denmark ===
16 June 1996
18:00

Croatia	3–0	Denmark
Šuker 54' (pen.), 90'; Boban 81'	Report

Hillsborough, Sheffield
Attendance: 33,671
Referee: Marc Batta (France)

Croatia	Denmark

GK	1	Dražen Ladić
RB	13	Mario Stanić	(yellow card) 20'
CB	4	Igor Štimac
CB	6	Slaven Bilić
LB	3	Robert Jarni
DM	5	Nikola Jerkan
RM	8	Robert Prosinečki	(yellow card) 23'	(substituted off) 88'
CM	7	Aljoša Asanović
LM	10	Zvonimir Boban (c)		(substituted off) 82'
CF	19	Goran Vlaović	(yellow card) 39'	(substituted off) 82'
CF	9	Davor Šuker
Substitutions:
DF	2	Nikola Jurčević		(substituted on) 82'
MF	14	Zvonimir Soldo		(substituted on) 82'
MF	16	Mladen Mladenović		(substituted on) 88'
Manager:
Miroslav Blažević

GK	1	Peter Schmeichel
RB	8	Claus Thomsen
CB	3	Marc Rieper
CB	5	Jes Høgh
LB	6	Michael Schjønberg
RM	2	Thomas Helveg	(substituted off) 46'
CM	18	Kim Vilfort	(substituted off) 59'
LM	7	Brian Steen Nielsen
AM	10	Michael Laudrup (c)
AM	13	Henrik Larsen	(substituted off) 69'
CF	11	Brian Laudrup
Substitutions:
DF	20	Jacob Laursen	(substituted on) 46'
FW	9	Mikkel Beck	(substituted on) 59'
MF	19	Stig Tøfting	(substituted on) 69'
Manager:
Richard Møller Nielsen

Man of the Match:
Davor Šuker (Croatia)

Assistant referees:
Pierre Ufrasi (France)
Jacques Mas (France)
Fourth official:
Alain Sars (France)

=== Croatia vs Portugal ===
19 June 1996
16:30

Croatia	0–3	Portugal
	Report	Figo 4'; João Pinto 33'; Domingos 82'

City Ground, Nottingham
Attendance: 20,484
Referee: Bernd Heynemann (Germany)

Croatia	Portugal

GK	12	Marijan Mrmić
CB	20	Dario Šimić
CB	15	Dubravko Pavličić	(yellow card) 36'
CB	6	Slaven Bilić
RM	2	Nikola Jurčević
CM	16	Mladen Mladenović		(substituted off) 46'
CM	14	Zvonimir Soldo
LM	3	Robert Jarni (c)	(yellow card) 30'
AM	8	Robert Prosinečki		(substituted off) 46'
CF	19	Goran Vlaović
CF	17	Igor Pamić	(yellow card) 10'	(substituted off) 46'
Substitutions:
FW	9	Davor Šuker		(substituted on) 46'
MF	7	Aljoša Asanović		(substituted on) 46'
MF	10	Zvonimir Boban		(substituted on) 46'
Manager:
Miroslav Blažević

GK	1	Vítor Baía (c)
RB	2	Secretário
CB	16	Hélder Cristóvão
CB	5	Fernando Couto
LB	13	Dimas Teixeira
CM	4	Oceano Cruz
CM	19	Paulo Sousa	(substituted off) 70'
RW	20	Luís Figo
AM	10	Rui Costa	(substituted off) 61'
LW	8	João Pinto
CF	9	Sá Pinto	(substituted off) 46'
Substitutions:
FW	15	Domingos	(substituted on) 46'
MF	14	Pedro Barbosa	(substituted on) 61'
MF	6	José Tavares	(substituted on) 70'
Manager:
António Oliveira

Man of the Match:
João Pinto (Portugal)

Assistant referees:
Hans Wolf (Germany)
Harald Sather (Germany)
Fourth official:
Hartmut Strampe (Germany)

=== Turkey vs Denmark ===
19 June 1996
16:30

Turkey	0–3	Denmark
	Report	B. Laudrup 50', 84'; A. Nielsen 69'

Hillsborough, Sheffield
Attendance: 28,951
Referee: Nikolai Levnikov (Russia)

Turkey	Denmark

GK	22	Rüştü Reçber	(yellow card) 89'
CB	4	Vedat İnceefe
CB	8	Ogün Temizkanoğlu
CB	3	Alpay Özalan
DM	5	Tugay Kerimoğlu	(yellow card) 44'
RM	15	Tayfun Korkut	(yellow card) 61'
LM	17	Abdullah Ercan
AM	7	Hami Mandıralı
RF	2	Recep Çetin (c)		(substituted off) 68'
CF	9	Hakan Şükür		(substituted off) 46'
LF	11	Orhan Çıkırıkçı		(substituted off) 68'
Substitutions:
FW	18	Arif Erdem		(substituted on) 46'
FW	14	Saffet Sancaklı		(substituted on) 68'
DF	20	Bülent Korkmaz		(substituted on) 68'
Manager:
Fatih Terim

GK	1	Peter Schmeichel
RB	8	Claus Thomsen
CB	3	Marc Rieper
CB	5	Jes Høgh
LB	6	Michael Schjønberg		(substituted off) 46'
CM	2	Thomas Helveg	(yellow card) 57'
CM	17	Allan Nielsen
CM	7	Brian Steen Nielsen
AM	10	Michael Laudrup (c)
CF	15	Erik Bo Andersen		(substituted off) 88'
CF	11	Brian Laudrup
Substitutions:
MF	13	Henrik Larsen	(yellow card) 81'	(substituted on) 46'
FW	21	Søren Andersen		(substituted on) 88'
Manager:
Richard Møller Nielsen

Man of the Match:
Brian Laudrup (Denmark)

Assistant referees:
Serguei Foursa (Russia)
Sergei Frantsuzov (Russia)
Fourth official:
Sergei Khusainov (Russia)

== See also ==
- Croatia at the UEFA European Championship
- Denmark at the UEFA European Championship
- Portugal at the UEFA European Championship
- Turkey at the UEFA European Championship
