= UEFA Euro 2016 qualifying Group H =

Football tournament qualification stage

The UEFA Euro 2016 qualifying Group H was one of the nine groups to decide which teams would qualify for the UEFA Euro 2016 finals tournament. Group H consisted of six teams: Italy, Croatia, Norway, Bulgaria, Azerbaijan, and Malta, where they played against each other home-and-away in a round-robin format.

The top two teams, Italy and Croatia, qualified directly for the finals. As third-placed Norway weren't the highest-ranked among all third-placed teams, they advanced to the play-offs, where they lost to Hungary and thus failed to qualify.

== Standings ==
Pos	Team	Pld	W	D	L	GF	GA	GD	Pts	Qualification	(Italy)	(Croatia)	(Norway)	(Bulgaria)	(Azerbaijan)	(Malta)
1	Italy	10	7	3	0	16	7	+9	24	Qualify for final tournament	—	1–1	2–1	1–0	2–1	1–0
2	Croatia (Note: Croatia were deducted one point after charges for racist behaviour in the home match against Italy.)	10	6	3	1	20	5	+15	20	Qualify for final tournament	1–1	—	5–1	3–0	6–0	2–0
3	Norway	10	6	1	3	13	10	+3	19	Advance to play-offs	0–2	2–0	—	2–1	0–0	2–0
4	Bulgaria	10	3	2	5	9	12	−3	11		2–2	0–1	0–1	—	2–0	1–1
5	Azerbaijan	10	1	3	6	7	18	−11	6		1–3	0–0	0–1	1–2	—	2–0
6	Malta	10	0	2	8	3	16	−13	2		0–1	0–1	0–3	0–1	2–2	—

Source: UEFA
Rules for classification: Qualification tiebreakers

== Matches ==
The fixtures were released by UEFA the same day as the draw, which was held on 23 February 2014 in Nice. Times are CET/CEST, (Note: CET (UTC+1) for matches on 16 November 2014 and 28 March 2015, and CEST (UTC+2) for all other matches.) as listed by UEFA (local times are in parentheses).

9 September 2014
18:00
(21:00 UTC+5)

Azerbaijan	1–2	Bulgaria
Nazarov 54'	Report	Mitsanski 14'; V. Hristov 87'

Bakcell Arena, Baku
Attendance: 11,000
Referee: Alon Yefet (Israel)
9 September 2014
20:45
(20:45 UTC+2)

Croatia	2–0	Malta
Modrić 46'; Kramarić 81'	Report

Stadion Maksimir, Zagreb
Attendance: 8,333
Referee: Vladislav Bezborodov (Russia)
9 September 2014
20:45
(20:45 UTC+2)

Norway	0–2	Italy
	Report	Zaza 16'; Bonucci 62'

Ullevaal Stadion, Oslo
Attendance: 26,265
Referee: Milorad Mažić (Serbia)

10 October 2014
20:45
(21:45 UTC+3)

Bulgaria	0–1	Croatia
	Report	Bodurov 36' (o.g.)

Vasil Levski National Stadium, Sofia
Attendance: 29,733
Referee: Antonio Mateu Lahoz (Spain)
10 October 2014
20:45
(20:45 UTC+2)

Italy	2–1	Azerbaijan
Chiellini 44', 82'	Report	Chiellini 76' (o.g.)

Stadio Renzo Barbera, Palermo
Attendance: 33,000
Referee: Hüseyin Göçek (Turkey)
10 October 2014
20:45
(20:45 UTC+2)

Malta	0–3	Norway
	Report	Dæhli 22'; King 26', 49'

National Stadium, Ta' Qali
Attendance: 8,067
Referee: Antony Gautier (France)

13 October 2014
20:45
(20:45 UTC+2)

Croatia	6–0	Azerbaijan
Kramarić 11'; Perišić 34', 45'; Brozović 45+1'; Modrić 57' (pen.); Sadygov 61' (o.g.)	Report

Stadion Gradski vrt, Osijek
Attendance: 16,021
Referee: Stephan Studer (Switzerland)
13 October 2014
20:45
(20:45 UTC+2)

Malta	0–1	Italy
	Report	Pellè 24'

National Stadium, Ta' Qali
Attendance: 16,942
Referee: Ovidiu Hațegan (Romania)
13 October 2014
20:45
(20:45 UTC+2)

Norway	2–1	Bulgaria
T. Elyounoussi 13'; Nielsen 72'	Report	Bodurov 43'

Ullevaal Stadion, Oslo
Attendance: 18,990
Referee: Olegário Benquerença (Portugal)

16 November 2014
18:00
(21:00 UTC+4)

Azerbaijan	0–1	Norway
	Report	Nordtveit 25'

Bakcell Arena, Baku
Attendance: 9,200
Referee: Yevhen Aranovskiy (Ukraine)
16 November 2014
20:45
(21:45 UTC+2)

Bulgaria	1–1	Malta
Galabinov 6'	Report	Failla 49' (pen.)

Vasil Levski National Stadium, Sofia
Attendance: 3,300
Referee: Martin Strömbergsson (Sweden)
16 November 2014
20:45
(20:45 UTC+1)

Italy	1–1	Croatia
Candreva 11'	Report	Perišić 15'

San Siro, Milan
Attendance: 63,222
Referee: Björn Kuipers (Netherlands)

28 March 2015
18:00
(21:00 UTC+4)

Azerbaijan	2–0	Malta
Huseynov 4'; Nazarov 90+2'	Report

Tofiq Bahramov Republican Stadium, Baku
Attendance: 14,600
Referee: Halis Özkahya (Turkey)
28 March 2015
18:00
(18:00 UTC+1)

Croatia	5–1	Norway
Brozović 30'; Perišić 53'; Olić 65'; Schildenfeld 87'; Pranjić 90+4'	Report	Tettey 80'

Stadion Maksimir, Zagreb
Attendance: 23,920
Referee: Carlos Velasco Carballo (Spain)
28 March 2015
20:45
(21:45 UTC+2)

Bulgaria	2–2	Italy
I. Popov 11'; Mitsanski 17'	Report	Y. Minev 4' (o.g.); Éder 84'

Vasil Levski National Stadium, Sofia
Attendance: 6,000
Referee: Damir Skomina (Slovenia)

12 June 2015
20:45
(20:45 UTC+2)

Croatia	1–1 (Note: Croatia were deducted one point after charges for racist behaviour (display of a Nazi symbol) in this match. In addition, the Croatian Football Federation were ordered to play their next two home matches of UEFA competition behind closed doors and not to play any of its remaining qualifying games at Stadion Poljud. A fine of €100,000 was also imposed. The Croatian Football Federation appealed against the decision and a hearing was scheduled for 17 September 2015. Croatia's appeal was rejected.)	Italy
Mandžukić 11'	Report	Candreva 36' (pen.)

Stadion Poljud, Split
Attendance: 0 (Note: Played behind closed doors due to punishment handed to Croatia by UEFA for crowd trouble in their home match against Norway. The Croatian FA were also fined €50,000 because of that incident.)
Referee: Martin Atkinson (England)
12 June 2015
20:45
(20:45 UTC+2)

Malta	0–1	Bulgaria
	Report	I. Popov 56'

National Stadium, Ta' Qali
Attendance: 3,924
Referee: Aleksandar Stavrev (Macedonia)
12 June 2015
20:45
(20:45 UTC+2)

Norway	0–0	Azerbaijan
	Report

Ullevaal Stadion, Oslo
Attendance: 21,228
Referee: Paweł Gil (Poland)

3 September 2015
18:00
(21:00 UTC+5)

Azerbaijan	0–0	Croatia
	Report

Bakcell Arena, Baku
Attendance: 10,000
Referee: Ruddy Buquet (France)
3 September 2015
20:45
(21:45 UTC+3)

Bulgaria	0–1	Norway
	Report	Forren 57'

Vasil Levski National Stadium, Sofia
Attendance: 12,913
Referee: Bas Nijhuis (Netherlands)
3 September 2015
20:45
(20:45 UTC+2)

Italy	1–0	Malta
Pellè 69'	Report

Stadio Artemio Franchi, Florence
Attendance: 12,551
Referee: Ivan Kružliak (Slovakia)

6 September 2015
18:00
(18:00 UTC+2)

Malta	2–2	Azerbaijan
Mifsud 55'; Effiong 71'	Report	Amirguliyev 36', 80'

National Stadium, Ta' Qali
Attendance: 5,266
Referee: Harald Lechner (Austria)
6 September 2015
18:00
(18:00 UTC+2)

Norway	2–0	Croatia
Berget 51'; Ćorluka 69' (o.g.)	Report

Ullevaal Stadion, Oslo
Attendance: 26,751
Referee: Viktor Kassai (Hungary)
6 September 2015
20:45
(20:45 UTC+2)

Italy	1–0	Bulgaria
De Rossi 6' (pen.)	Report

Stadio Renzo Barbera, Palermo
Attendance: 21,000
Referee: Sergei Karasev (Russia)

10 October 2015
18:00
(21:00 UTC+5)

Azerbaijan	1–3	Italy
Nazarov 31'	Report	Éder 11'; El Shaarawy 43'; Darmian 65'

National Stadium, Baku
Attendance: 48,000
Referee: Willie Collum (Scotland)
10 October 2015
18:00
(18:00 UTC+2)

Norway	2–0	Malta
Tettey 19'; Søderlund 52'	Report

Ullevaal Stadion, Oslo
Attendance: 27,120
Referee: Arnold Hunter (Northern Ireland)
10 October 2015
20:45
(20:45 UTC+2)

Croatia	3–0	Bulgaria
Perišić 2'; Rakitić 42'; N. Kalinić 81'	Report

Stadion Maksimir, Zagreb
Attendance: 0 (Note: Played behind closed doors and away from Stadion Poljud due to a sanction imposed on Croatia after charges for racist behaviour in their home match against Italy.)
Referee: Artur Soares Dias (Portugal)

13 October 2015
20:45
(21:45 UTC+3)

Bulgaria	2–0	Azerbaijan
M. Aleksandrov 20'; Rangelov 56'	Report

Vasil Levski National Stadium, Sofia
Attendance: 2,500
Referee: Tamás Bognár (Hungary)
13 October 2015
20:45
(20:45 UTC+2)

Italy	2–1	Norway
Florenzi 73'; Pellè 82'	Report	Tettey 23'

Stadio Olimpico, Rome
Attendance: 30,000
Referee: Felix Brych (Germany)
13 October 2015
20:45
(20:45 UTC+2)

Malta	0–1	Croatia
	Report	Perišić 25'

National Stadium, Ta' Qali
Attendance: 5,835
Referee: Mark Clattenburg (England)

== Goalscorers ==
There were 68 goals scored in 30 matches, for an average of 2.27 goals per match.

6 goals

- (Croatia national football team) Ivan Perišić

3 goals

- (Azerbaijan national football team) Dimitrij Nazarov
- (Italy national football team) Graziano Pellè
- (Norway national football team) Alexander Tettey

2 goals

- (Azerbaijan national football team) Rahid Amirguliyev
- (Bulgaria national football team) Iliyan Mitsanski
- (Bulgaria national football team) Ivelin Popov
- (Croatia national football team) Marcelo Brozović
- (Croatia national football team) Andrej Kramarić
- (Croatia national football team) Luka Modrić
- (Italy national football team) Antonio Candreva
- (Italy national football team) Giorgio Chiellini
- (Italy national football team) Éder
- (Norway national football team) Joshua King

1 goal

- (Azerbaijan national football team) Javid Huseynov
- (Bulgaria national football team) Mihail Aleksandrov
- (Bulgaria national football team) Nikolay Bodurov
- (Bulgaria national football team) Andrey Galabinov
- (Bulgaria national football team) Ventsislav Hristov
- (Bulgaria national football team) Dimitar Rangelov
- (Croatia national football team) Nikola Kalinić
- (Croatia national football team) Mario Mandžukić
- (Croatia national football team) Ivica Olić
- (Croatia national football team) Danijel Pranjić
- (Croatia national football team) Ivan Rakitić
- (Croatia national football team) Gordon Schildenfeld
- (Italy national football team) Leonardo Bonucci
- (Italy national football team) Matteo Darmian
- (Italy national football team) Daniele De Rossi
- (Italy national football team) Stephan El Shaarawy
- (Italy national football team) Alessandro Florenzi
- (Italy national football team) Simone Zaza
- (Malta national football team) Alfred Effiong
- (Malta national football team) Clayton Failla
- (Malta national football team) Michael Mifsud
- (Norway national football team) Jo Inge Berget
- (Norway national football team) Mats Møller Dæhli
- (Norway national football team) Tarik Elyounoussi
- (Norway national football team) Vegard Forren
- (Norway national football team) Håvard Nielsen
- (Norway national football team) Håvard Nordtveit
- (Norway national football team) Alexander Søderlund

1 own goal

- (Azerbaijan national football team) Rashad Sadygov (against Croatia)
- (Bulgaria national football team) Nikolay Bodurov (against Croatia)
- (Bulgaria national football team) Yordan Minev (against Italy)
- (Croatia national football team) Vedran Ćorluka (against Norway)
- (Italy national football team) Giorgio Chiellini (against Azerbaijan)

== Discipline ==
A player was automatically suspended for the next match for the following offences:

- Receiving a red card (red card suspensions could be extended for serious offences)
- Receiving three yellow cards in three different matches, as well as after fifth and any subsequent yellow card (yellow card suspensions were carried forward to the play-offs, but not the finals or any other future international matches)

The following suspensions were served during the qualifying matches:

Team	Player	Offence(s)	Suspended for match(es)
Azerbaijan	Maksim Medvedev	(red card) vs Russia (15 October 2013) (Note: The suspension was carried over from the 2014 FIFA World Cup qualification.)	vs Bulgaria (9 September 2014)
Azerbaijan	Badavi Guseynov	(red card) vs Italy (10 October 2015)	vs Bulgaria (13 October 2015)
Bulgaria	Petar Zanev	(yellow card) (yellow-red card) vs Czech Republic (15 October 2013)	vs Azerbaijan (9 September 2014)
Bulgaria	Svetoslav Dyakov	(yellow card) vs Italy (28 March 2015); (yellow card) vs Malta (12 June 2015); (yellow card) vs Italy (6 September 2015)	vs Croatia (10 October 2015)
Bulgaria	Yordan Minev	(yellow card) vs Norway (13 October 2014); (yellow card) vs Norway (3 September 2015); (yellow card) vs Italy (6 September 2015)	vs Croatia (10 October 2015)
Bulgaria	Iliyan Mitsanski	(red card) vs Italy (6 September 2015)	vs Croatia (10 October 2015) vs Azerbaijan (13 October 2015)
Croatia	Josip Šimunić	Discriminatory behaviour vs Iceland (19 November 2013)	vs Malta (9 September 2014) vs Bulgaria (10 October 2014) vs Azerbaijan (13 October 2014) vs Italy (16 November 2014) vs Norway (28 March 2015) vs Italy (12 June 2015) vs Azerbaijan (3 September 2015)
Croatia	Ante Rebić	(red card) vs Mexico (23 June 2014) (Note: The suspension was carried over from the 2014 FIFA World Cup.)	vs Malta (9 September 2014)
Croatia	Vedran Ćorluka	(yellow card) (yellow-red card) vs Norway (28 March 2015)	vs Italy (12 June 2015)
Croatia	Darijo Srna	(yellow card) (yellow-red card) vs Italy (12 June 2015)	vs Azerbaijan (3 September 2015)
Croatia	Mateo Kovačić	(yellow card) vs Italy (16 November 2014); (yellow card) vs Italy (12 June 2015); (yellow card) vs Azerbaijan (3 September 2015)	vs Norway (6 September 2015)
Croatia	Ivica Olić	(yellow card) vs Bulgaria (10 October 2014); (yellow card) vs Italy (12 June 2015); (yellow card) vs Norway (6 September 2015)	vs Bulgaria (10 October 2015)
Croatia	Duje Čop	(red card) vs Bulgaria (10 October 2015)	vs Malta (13 October 2015)
Italy	Claudio Marchisio	(red card) vs Uruguay (24 June 2014)	vs Norway (9 September 2014)
Italy	Leonardo Bonucci	(red card) vs Malta (13 October 2014)	vs Croatia (16 November 2014)
Italy	Daniele De Rossi	(red card) vs Bulgaria (6 September 2015)	vs Azerbaijan (10 October 2015) vs Norway (13 October 2015)
Malta	Steve Borg	(red card) vs Croatia (9 September 2014)	vs Norway (10 October 2014) vs Italy (13 October 2014) vs Bulgaria (16 November 2014)
Malta	Michael Mifsud	(red card) vs Italy (13 October 2014)	vs Bulgaria (16 November 2014) vs Azerbaijan (28 March 2015)
Malta	Paul Fenech	(yellow card) vs Bulgaria (16 November 2014); (yellow card) vs Bulgaria (12 June 2015); (yellow card) vs Italy (3 September 2015)	vs Azerbaijan (6 September 2015)
Norway	Tarik Elyounoussi	(yellow card) vs Bulgaria (13 October 2014); (yellow card) vs Azerbaijan (16 November 2014); (yellow card) vs Croatia (28 March 2015)	vs Azerbaijan (12 June 2015)
