= Jiří Rosický =

Jiří Rosický may refer to:

- Jiří Rosický (footballer, born 1948), Czechoslovak footballer
- Jiří Rosický (footballer, born 1977), Czech footballer, son of the above
- Jiří Rosický (mathematician), Czech mathematician
