= Vlastimil Petržela =

Czech football coach and former player (born 1953)

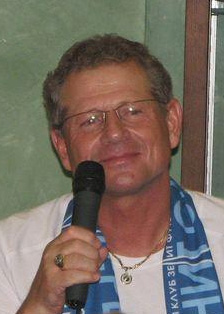

Personal information
- Date of birth: 20 July 1953 (age 73)
- Place of birth: Prostějov, Czechoslovakia
- Position: Forward

Youth career
- 1960–1970: Sokol Kralice na Hané

Senior career*
Years	Team	Apps	(Gls)
1970–1974	SK Prostějov		
1974–1976	Zbrojovka Brno	13	(0)
1976–1978	SK Prostějov		
1978–1980	SK Sigma Olomouc		
1980–1981	RH Cheb	28	(14)
1981–1985	Slavia Prague	75	(22)
1985–2001	TJ Sokol Cholupice		

International career
1982–1983	Czechoslovakia	2	(0)

Managerial career
- 1986: Slavia Prague (assistant)
- 1986–1987: Slavia Prague
- 1987–1990: Slavia Prague (assistant)
- 1990–1992: Slavia Prague
- 1992–1995: FC Slovan Liberec
- 1996: Sparta Prague
- 1996–2002: Bohemians Prague
- 2002: FK Mladá Boleslav
- 2002–2006: FC Zenit
- 2006–2007: SK Sigma Olomouc
- 2007–2008: Neftchi Baku
- 2009–2010: FK Viktoria Žižkov
- 2010–2012: MFK Zemplín Michalovce
- 2014–2015: FC Sellier & Bellot Vlašim
- 2016–2017: FC Baník Ostrava
- 2017–2018: FC Baník Ostrava (advisor)
- 2018: FC Fastav Zlín
- 2019–: FC Sellier & Bellot Vlašim (youth)
- * Club domestic league appearances and goals

Vlastimil Petržela (born 20 July 1953 in Prostějov) is a Czech football coach and former player. He worked with Zenit Saint Petersburg from 2003 to 2006, winning the silver medals of Russian Premier League in 2003 and reaching the quarterfinal stage of the 2005–06 UEFA Cup. Before Zenit he managed SK Slavia Prague, Sparta Prague and Bohemians Prague.

As a player, he appeared for Czechoslovakia at the 1982 FIFA World Cup as a substitute against Kuwait. He ended his career because of the serious achilles tendon rupture in 1985, although he continued to play at lower divisions. Shortly after, he became an assistant manager in SK Slavia Prague, where he obtained a manager status during the years. He then moved to FC Slovan Liberec, AC Sparta Prague or FC Bohemians Prague.

There were speculations in 2001, after the Czech republic failed to qualify for a FIFA World Cup 2002, that Petržela could be a new national team manager. Petržela himself said, that the speculations were true, as he was one of the three finalists for the position, but Karel Brückner was eventually appointed as a manager of Czech National Team instead of Petržela.

Petržela signed a three-year contract as manager of FK Mladá Boleslav in 2002, however before the end of the calendar year it was announced that he was heading to Russia to be the new manager of Zenit St. Petersburg. He became the first non-Russian, or non-Soviet manager in the history of FC Zenit. He also became the second non-Russian coach in the Russian Premier League.

In the 2006/2007 season he coached Sigma Olomouc. Petržela was appointed manager of Neftchi Baku in the summer of 2007, and was sacked six-months later on 5 January 2008.

In the season 2009/10 he coached FK Viktoria Žižkov in the Czech 2. Liga and in the season 2010/11 he became the new coach of MFK Zemplín Michalovce in the Slovak 2. liga. He joined Vlašim in January 2014.

In 2016–2017 Petržela helped Baník Ostrava to qualify to the Czech First League. Shortly afterwards, he became manager of FC Zlín for a short period. He currently works as a youth coach in Vlašim.

== Playing style ==
His former coach Milan Máčala from SK Sigma Olomouc and SK Slavia Prague, who once was a manager of national team of Czechoslovakia (1990-1993) described Petržela as a personality on and off the pitch, hard working striker with good endurance. He also claimed, that Petržela was a good header who had the decent orientation in the penalty area. Máčala compared Petržela's playing abilities to Václav Daněk, who was one the most prolific Czechoslovak goalscorers in his era, or to Brazilian striker Hulk.

== Style of management ==
As a manager, Petržela was known for his tough demands on players in a terms of physical fitness. In his own words, he was a pioneer of a hard working pre-season training camp in the 1980s and 1990s in the Czech Republic. Also he was known as a manager, who was trying to give a chance to young talent. In many cases, Petržela was successful as he was able to developed careers of many future Czech internationals, for example Radek Bejbl, Jiří Jarošík, Vladimír Šmicer, Antonín Barák, Jan Suchopárek, Radek Šírl, Patrik Berger or Roman Bednář. He also admitted, that sometimes he was rough, vulgar and that he had to slap some of his players to force them for a better performance.

Among his favourite players he had coached, Petržela named the striker Pavel Kuka, forward Pavel Řehák, who is, since 2018, the assistant manager of Slavia Prague, and the Czech defender Tomáš Řepka.

== Honours ==
=== Club ===
TJ Zbrojovka Brno

- Intertoto Cup: 1975, 1976

TJ Železárny Prostějov

- Moravian-Silesian Division – Group D (third tier) second place: 1977-1978

TJ Sigma ZTS Olomouc

- Czech National Football League group B (second tier) third place: 1978-1979, 1979–1980

FK Hvězda Cheb

- Intertoto Cup: 1981

SK Slavia Praha Czechoslovak First League third place: 1984-1985

=== Individual ===
Czechoslovak First League third best goalscorer: 1981-1982

=== Manager ===
SK Slavia Prague

- Czech Cup runner-up: 1986–1987, 1988–1989 (as an assistant manager)

AC Sparta Prague

- Czech Cup: 1995–96

Bohemians Prague

- Czech National Football League 3rd Place: 1997-1998
- Czech National Football League Winner: 1998-1999

Zenit Saint Petersburg

- Russian Premier League Cup: 2003
- Russian Premier League 2nd Place: 2003

Baník Ostrava

- Czech National Football League 2nd Place: 2016–2017

=== Individual ===
- Czech Coach of the year: 1994
- Czech Coach of the year 2nd Place: 1995
- Czech Coach of the year 3rd Place: 1996, 2003
- Czech National Football League Manager of the Month: August 2016
