= Czech Footballer of the Year =

Award by the Football Association of the Czech Republic

The Czech Footballer of the Year (Czech: Fotbalista roku) is awarded in the Czech Republic by the Football Association of the Czech Republic (FAČR). Eligibility extends to Czech players in the Czech Republic and abroad. Awards for young player, coach and Czech First League personality of the year are also awarded. The award was first presented in 1965, as an award for the whole of Czechoslovakia. It was won by Ján Popluhár.

Petr Čech won the award for an unprecedented sixth time in the 2012 ceremony, passing the previous record of five wins held by fellow goalkeeper Ivo Viktor. Viktor had previously won the award more times than any other player, having won the award five times in the Czechoslovak era between 1968 and 1976.

The other football award in the Czech Republic is the Golden Ball, awarded by sport journalists.

== Winners ==
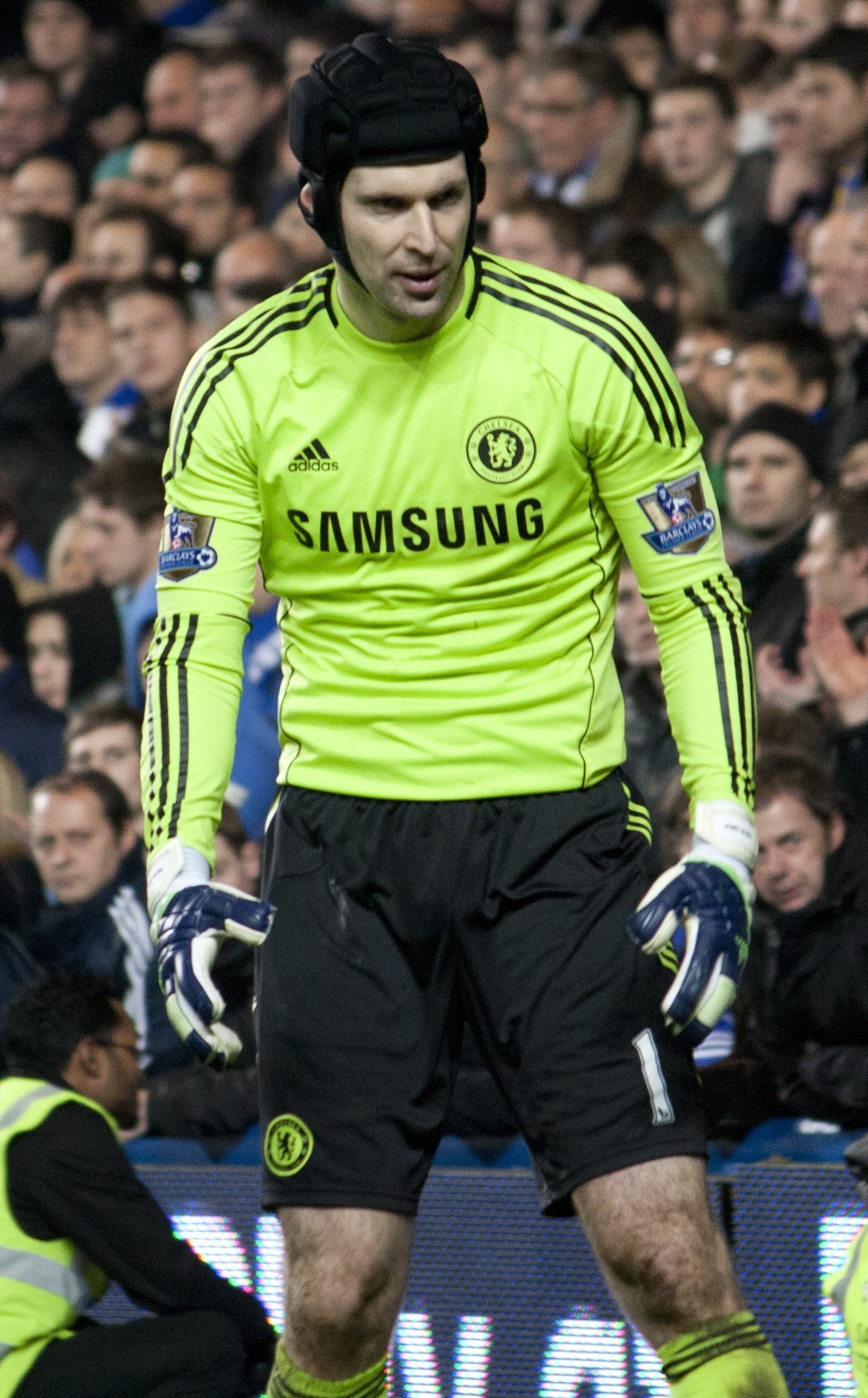
Petr Čech, nine-time winner.

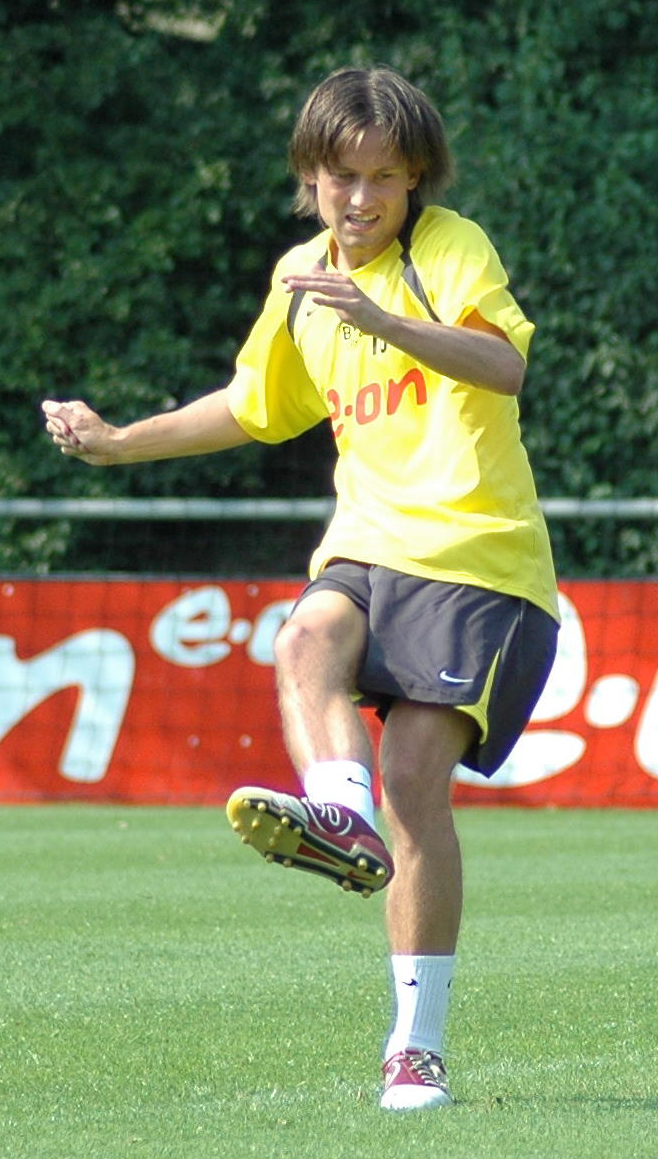
Tomáš Rosický won the award three times in his career.

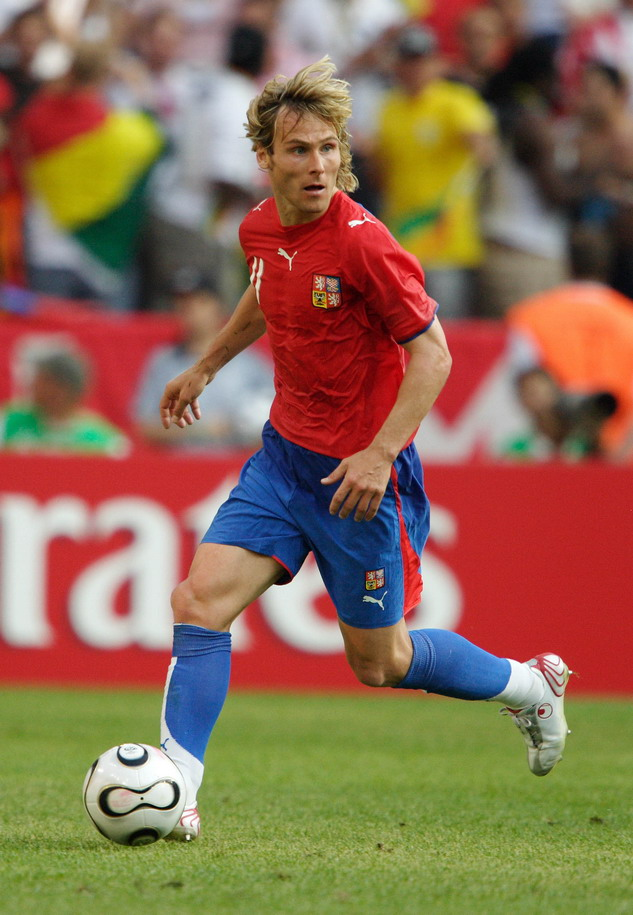
Pavel Nedvěd won the award four times in his career.

The award has been made every year since the first award in 1965. In 1996 two players shared the award.

Key
†	Indicates multiple award winners in the same year

Year	Player	Club	Notes
1993	Petr Kouba	(Czech Republic) Sparta Prague	
1994	Pavel Kuka	(Germany) 1. FC Kaiserslautern	
1995	Radek Drulák	(Czech Republic) Petra Drnovice	
1996 ^{†}	Patrik Berger	(England) Liverpool	
1996 ^{†}	Karel Poborský	(England) Manchester United	
1997	Jiří Němec	(Germany) Schalke 04	
1998	Pavel Nedvěd	(Italy) Lazio	
1999	Jan Koller	(Belgium) Anderlecht	
2000	Pavel Nedvěd	(Italy) Lazio	
2001	Tomáš Rosický	(Germany) Borussia Dortmund	
2002	Tomáš Rosický	(Germany) Borussia Dortmund	
2003	Pavel Nedvěd	(Italy) Juventus	
2004	Pavel Nedvěd	(Italy) Juventus	
2005	Petr Čech	(England) Chelsea	
2006	Tomáš Rosický	(England) Arsenal	
2007	Marek Jankulovski	(Italy) Milan	
2008	Petr Čech	(England) Chelsea	
2009	Petr Čech	(England) Chelsea	
2010	Petr Čech	(England) Chelsea	
2011	Petr Čech	(England) Chelsea	
2012	Petr Čech	(England) Chelsea	
2013	Petr Čech	(England) Chelsea	
2014	David Lafata	(Czech Republic) Sparta Prague	
2015	Petr Čech	(England) Arsenal	
2016	Petr Čech	(England) Arsenal	
2017	Vladimír Darida	(Germany) Hertha BSC	
2018	Tomáš Vaclík	(Spain) Sevilla	
2019	Tomáš Souček	(Czech Republic) Slavia Prague	
2020	Tomáš Souček	(England) West Ham United	
2021	Patrik Schick	(Germany) Bayer 04 Leverkusen	
2022	Patrik Schick	(Germany) Bayer 04 Leverkusen	
2023	Tomáš Souček	(England) West Ham United	
2024	Tomáš Souček	(England) West Ham United	
2025	Pavel Šulc	(France) Lyon	

=== Other awards ===
Year	Coach of the Year	Talent of the Year	Personality of the League
1993	Dušan Uhrin (Sparta Prague)	-	
1994	Vlastimil Petržela (Slovan Liberec)	Richard Dostálek (1. FC Brno)	Jozef Chovanec (Sparta Prague)
1995	Dušan Uhrin (national team)	Ivo Ulich (Hradec Králové)	Jan Stejskal (Slavia Prague)
1996	Dušan Uhrin (national team)	Marek Zúbek (Brno)	Radek Drulák (Drnovice)
1997	František Cipro (Slavia Prague)	Martin Lukeš (Baník Ostrava)	Sladjan Ašanin (Slavia Prague)
1998	Jozef Chovanec (national team)	Tomáš Došek (Viktoria Plzeň)	Jaroslav Šilhavý (Viktoria Žižkov)
1999	Jozef Chovanec (national team)	Tomáš Rosický (Sparta Prague)	Zdeněk Jánoš (Jablonec 97)
2000	Jozef Chovanec (national team)	Milan Baroš (Baník Ostrava)	Oldřich Machala (Sigma Olomouc)
2001	Karel Brückner (U-21 national team)	Petr Čech (Chmel Blšany/Sparta Prague)	Miroslav Kadlec (Drnovice/Brno)
2002	Karel Brückner (national team)	Tomáš Hübschman (Sparta Prague)	Jiří Němec (Chmel Blšany)
2003	Karel Brückner (national team)	Jan Laštůvka (Baník Ostrava)	Karel Poborský (Sparta Prague)
2004	Karel Brückner (national team)	Tomáš Jun (Sparta Prague)	Karel Poborský (Sparta Prague)
2005	Karel Brückner (national team)	Martin Latka (Slavia Prague)	Karel Poborský (Sparta Prague)
2006	Vítězslav Lavička (Slovan Liberec)	Daniel Kolář (Sparta Prague)	Jaromír Blažek (Sparta Prague)
2007	Karel Brückner (national team)	Martin Fenin (Teplice/Eintracht Frankfurt)	Pavel Verbíř (Teplice)
2008	Karel Jarolím (Slavia Prague)	Tomáš Necid (Jablonec/Slavia Prague)	Vladimír Šmicer (Slavia Prague)
2009	František Komňacký (Jablonec)	Adam Hloušek (Jablonec/Slavia Prague)	Tomáš Řepka (Sparta Prague)
2010	Pavel Vrba (Viktoria Plzeň)	Václav Kadlec (Sparta Prague)	Pavel Horváth (Viktoria Plzeň)
2011	Pavel Vrba (Viktoria Plzeň)	Ladislav Krejčí (Sparta Prague)	Pavel Horváth (Viktoria Plzeň)
2012	Pavel Vrba (Viktoria Plzeň)	Tomáš Kalas (Vitesse)	Pavel Horváth (Viktoria Plzeň)
2013	Pavel Vrba (Viktoria Plzeň)	Matěj Vydra (West Bromwich Albion)	Pavel Horváth (Viktoria Plzeň)
2014	Pavel Vrba (national team)	Jan Baránek Jr. (Baník Ostrava)	David Lafata (Sparta Prague)
2015	Pavel Vrba (national team)	Václav Černý (Ajax)	
2016	Vítězslav Lavička (U-21 national team)	Patrik Schick (Sampdoria)	
2017	Pavel Vrba (Viktoria Plzeň)	Jakub Jankto (Udinese)	
2018	Pavel Vrba (Viktoria Plzeň)	David Lischka (Jablonec)	
2019	Jindřich Trpišovský (Slavia Prague)	Adam Hložek (Sparta Prague)	
2020	Jindřich Trpišovský (Slavia Prague)	David Zima (Slavia Prague)	
2021	Jindřich Trpišovský (Slavia Prague)	Adam Karabec (Sparta Prague)	
2022	Michal Bílek (Viktoria Plzeň)	Michal Ševčík (Zbrojovka Brno)	
2023	Jindřich Trpišovský (Slavia Prague)	Martin Vitík (Sparta Prague)	
2024	Miroslav Koubek (Viktoria Plzeň)	Antonín Kinský (Pardubice/Slavia Prague)	
2025	Jindřich Trpišovský (Slavia Prague)	Matěj Šín (Baník Ostrava/AZ)	
