= Tomáš Rosický =

Czech footballer (born 1980)

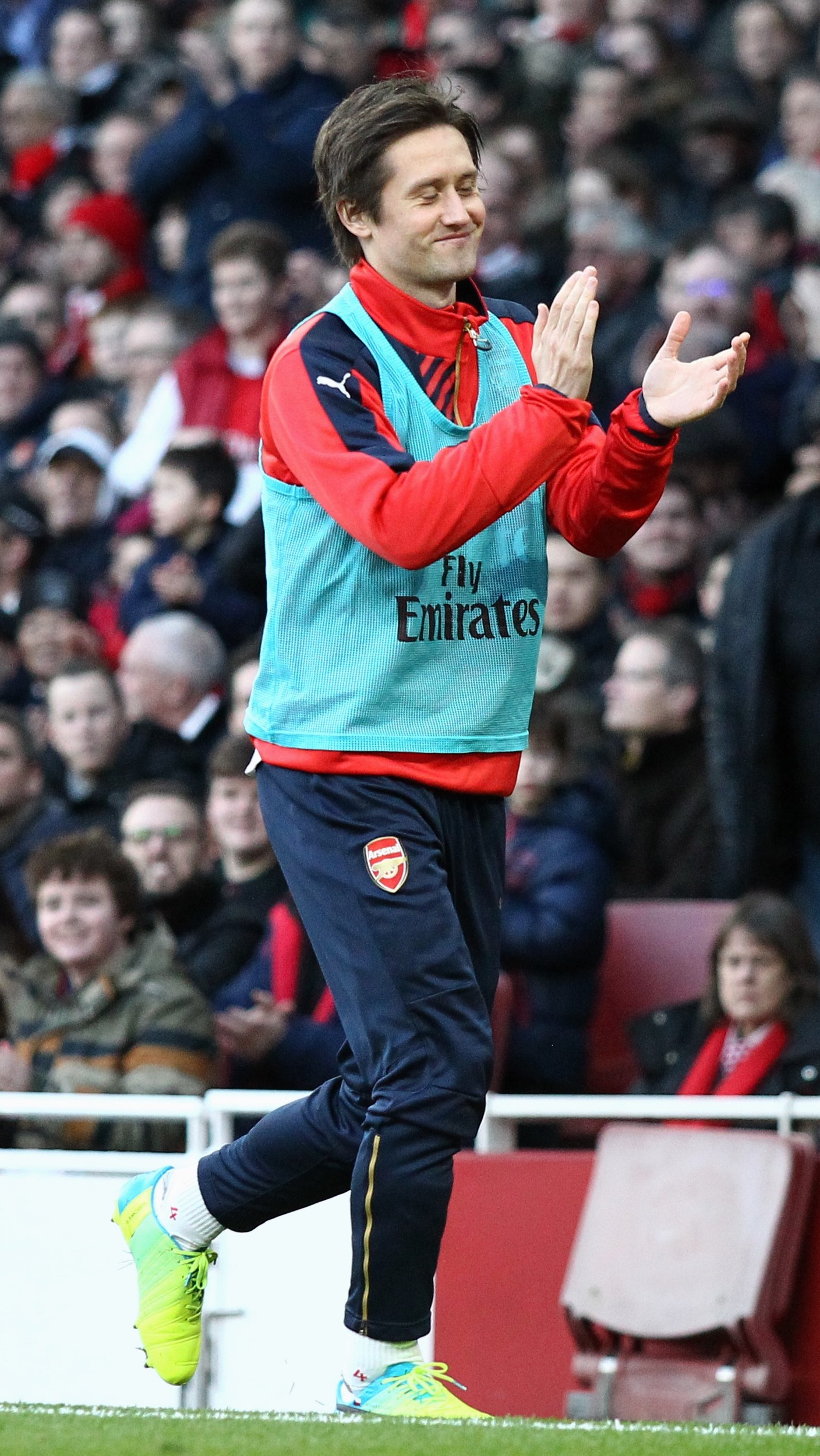
- Rosický with Arsenal in 2016

Personal information
- Full name: Tomáš Rosický
- Date of birth: 4 October 1980 (age 46)
- Place of birth: Prague, Czechoslovakia
- Height: 1.79 m (5 ft 10 in)
- Position: Midfielder

Youth career
- 1986–1988: ČKD Kompresory Prague
- 1988–1998: Sparta Prague

Senior career*
Years	Team	Apps	(Gls)
1998–2001	Sparta Prague	41	(8)
2001–2006	Borussia Dortmund	149	(20)
2006–2016	Arsenal	170	(19)
2016–2017	Sparta Prague	12	(1)
Total		372	(48)

International career
1995–1996	Czech Republic U15	10	(0)
1996	Czech Republic U16	12	(5)
1997–1998	Czech Republic U17	16	(6)
1998–1999	Czech Republic U18	9	(3)
1999	Czech Republic U21	2	(0)
2000–2016	Czech Republic	105	(23)
- * Club domestic league appearances and goals

Tomáš Rosický (Czech pronunciation: [ˈtomaːʃ ˈrosɪtskiː]; born 4 October 1980) is a Czech former professional footballer who was the captain of the Czech Republic national team for a ten-year period. He played club football for Sparta Prague, Borussia Dortmund and Arsenal. Currently, he serves as the sports director of Sparta Prague.

A midfielder, he started his professional career at his hometown club Sparta Prague, playing three seasons in the Czech First League before moving to Borussia Dortmund in 2001 for DM 25 million (approximately £8 million), at the time a record transfer fee paid by a Bundesliga club. In his first season in Germany, he helped his team win the league title and reach the 2002 UEFA Cup Final. Rosický joined Arsenal in 2006, and made 247 appearances for the club, including appearing in their victory in the 2014 FA Cup Final. He spent a total of ten seasons in the Premier League, affected by several long-term injuries.

Internationally, Rosický made his debut for the Czech Republic in 2000 and became captain of his country in 2006. He has taken part in four UEFA European Championships as well as the 2006 FIFA World Cup. He earned his 100th cap on 12 June 2015. Rosický is the Czech Republic's fourth highest goalscorer of all time.

== Club career ==
=== Sparta Prague ===
Rosický began his career at Sparta Prague, following his father Jiří who played for the club in the 1970s and brother, also called Jiří, who played as a trainee in the 1990s. Having played for Sparta's youth teams, Tomáš debuted for Sparta's senior team in 1998 and played three matches in the 1998–99 season, winning the national title with Sparta. He scored five goals in the 1999–2000 season as the team won the league for the second year in succession. He was named the "Talent of the Year" at the 1999 Czech Footballer of the Year awards. During the 2000–01 UEFA Champions League group stage, he scored goals in matches against Shakhtar Donetsk and Arsenal, attracting the attention of Bundesliga club Borussia Dortmund, which had a bid accepted for the player in January 2001.

=== Borussia Dortmund ===
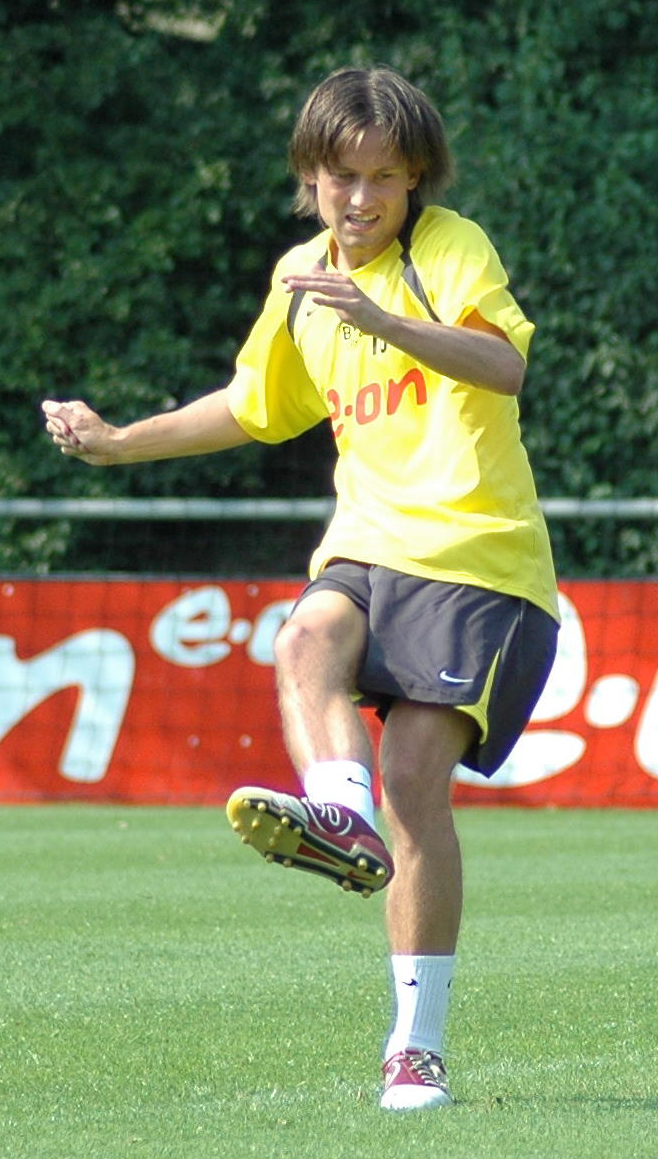
Rosický with Borussia Dortmund in 2006

On 9 January 2001, Rosický joined Borussia Dortmund, signing a five-year contract. His transfer fee of DM 25 million (approximately £8 million), made him the most expensive player in Bundesliga history and the most expensive Czech player to be sold to a foreign team. In his first full season at Dortmund, Rosický helped the club to win the 2001–02 Bundesliga title. He also took part in the 2002 UEFA Cup Final, which Dortmund ultimately lost 3–2 to Feyenoord. During his first two and a half seasons with the club, Rosický played 75 league matches, scoring nine goals and registering 20 assists. He subsequently agreed to extend his contract with Dortmund in July 2003, signing a deal to stay at the club until 2008. At the end of the season, Rosický was announced as the winner of the Czech Republic's Golden Ball award.

Although Rosický was part of the Dortmund team that reached the final of the 2003 DFB-Ligapokal, losing 4–2 to Hamburger SV, he later described the 2003–04 season as his "worst club season," as Dortmund failed to qualify for the following season's UEFA Champions League competition. He scored his first competitive goal of the 2005–06 season in February 2006, against MSV Duisburg; it was his 16th Bundesliga goal on his 139th league appearance. March 2006 saw him have injury problems with his thigh, but he scored twice in Dortmund's 4–2 win against Hamburg at the end the month. He was linked with a move to Spanish side Atlético Madrid, which he discussed in sports magazine Kicker, although mentioned in March 2006 that he had not signed a contract to move elsewhere. It was nevertheless his last season in the Bundesliga.

=== Arsenal ===
==== 2006–07 season ====
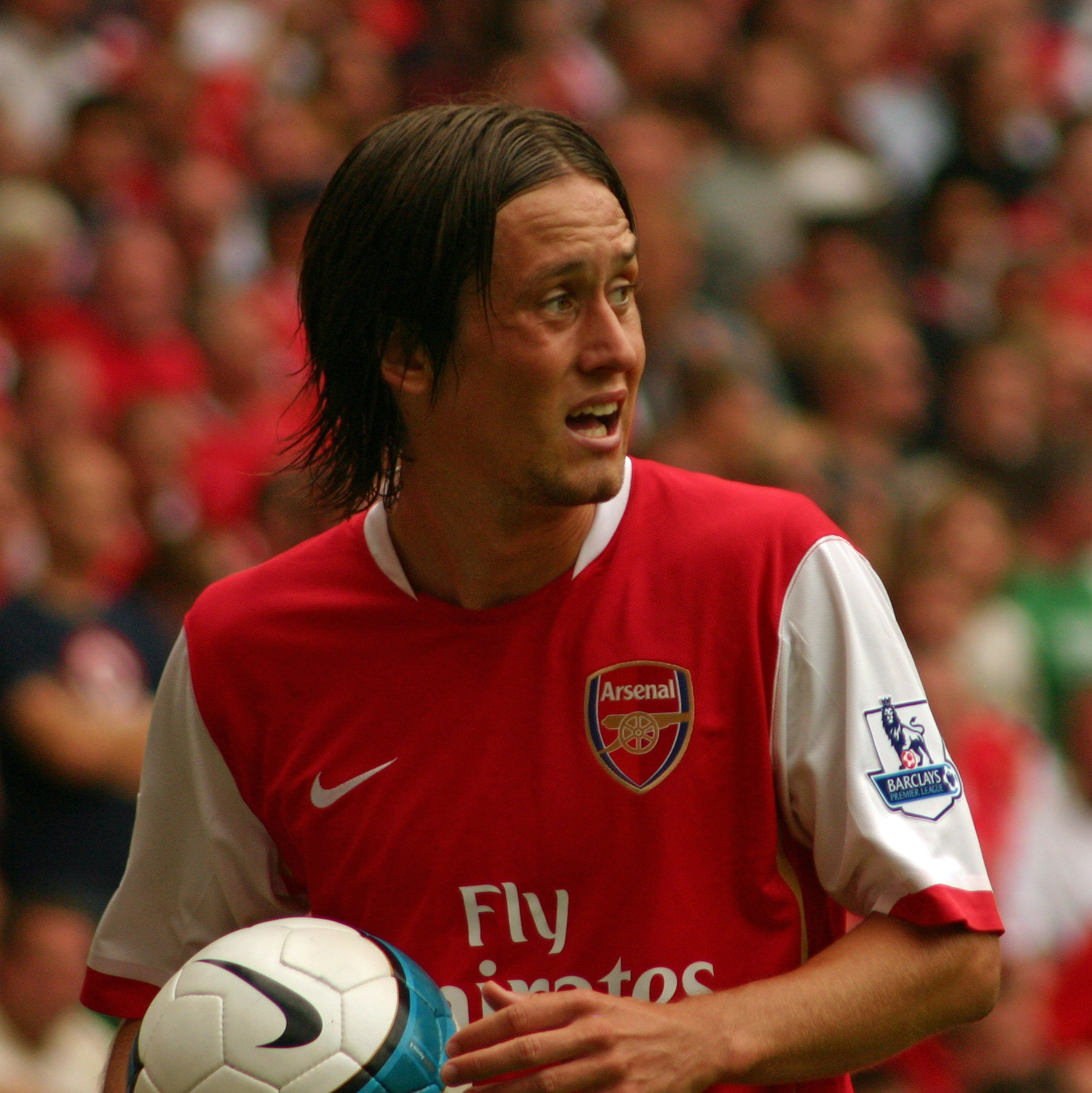
Rosický in 2007

On 23 May 2006, Arsenal confirmed that they had signed then 25-year-old Rosický on a long-term contract for an undisclosed fee. He made his competitive debut for Arsenal on 8 August 2006 in a 3–0 win over Dinamo Zagreb in a Champions League qualifier. Rosický scored his first Arsenal goal on 13 September 2006 against Hamburg in Arsenal's first Champions League game of the season, which Arsenal won 2–1. On 6 January 2007, he scored twice against Liverpool at Anfield in the FA Cup, in a 3–1 victory for Arsenal. In February 2007, Rosický was announced as the Czech Footballer of the Year for 2006, marking his third time winning the award after previous victories in 2001 and 2002. He scored his first Premier League goal on 11 February 2007 against Wigan Athletic. He also scored against Bolton Wanderers on 14 April 2007 and against Manchester City on 17 April 2007. He finished his debut season at Arsenal having scored six goals in 37 appearances for the club in all competitions.

==== 2007–08 season ====
On 29 August, Rosický scored in a Champions League qualifying match against his former club Sparta Prague, scoring what the BBC journalist Phil Harlow described as a "quality goal," shooting the ball under Sparta's goalkeeper after receiving a pass from Theo Walcott. Rosický scored his first Premier League goal of the season against Portsmouth in a 3–1 home win. He scored another goal from a cross provided by Walcott in a 2–0 October 2007 league match victory against Bolton, then scored Arsenal's second goal in a 2–0 victory over Wigan the following month, after a counter-attacking move towards the end of the game. His next league goal came in December when he scored in injury time in a 2–1 away loss at Middlesbrough, and he finished the month with another counter-attack goal, scoring the last of Arsenal's goals in a 4–1 away victory against Everton. His last goal of the season came in a 3–0 away win against Fulham on 19 January, as he scored with a volley following a pass from Eduardo. A tendon injury sustained in an FA Cup match against Newcastle United in January 2008 resulted in him playing no more matches that season.

==== 2009–10 season ====
Rosický did not feature for Arsenal during the 2008–09 season due to his hamstring tendon injury. He played half of a pre-season friendly match against Barnet in July 2009, but suffered an injury to his hamstring in August, delaying his competitive return to the first team. On 12 September 2009, he played his first match for Arsenal since January 2008, appearing as a substitute in the league match away to Manchester City. He provided the pass for Robin van Persie to score Arsenal's first goal in the match and scored the second goal himself as Arsenal lost 4–2.

On 4 January 2010, Rosický signed a new contract with Arsenal, saying, "It's felt like home since I arrived here four years ago and I believe we're on the verge of achieving something special together." Arsenal manager Arsène Wenger commented on the new deal with Rosický, saying, "I have spoken many times of Tomáš' class and contribution, not only on the pitch but off it as well, and I very much feel that this new contract reflects that." Following his contract announcement, Rosický scored an injury time equaliser in a 2–2 draw at Emirates Stadium against Everton. His third goal of the season came against Bolton, Rosický scoring Arsenal's first goal at the end of the first half after Bolton had taken an early two-goal lead. Arsenal went on to score three goals in the second half, winning the match 4–2. On 10 February, Rosický provided a cross for teammate Abou Diaby, who resultantly scored the solitary goal of their league match against Liverpool. Rosický finished the season with a total of three goals in 33 appearances in all club competitions.

==== 2010–11 season ====
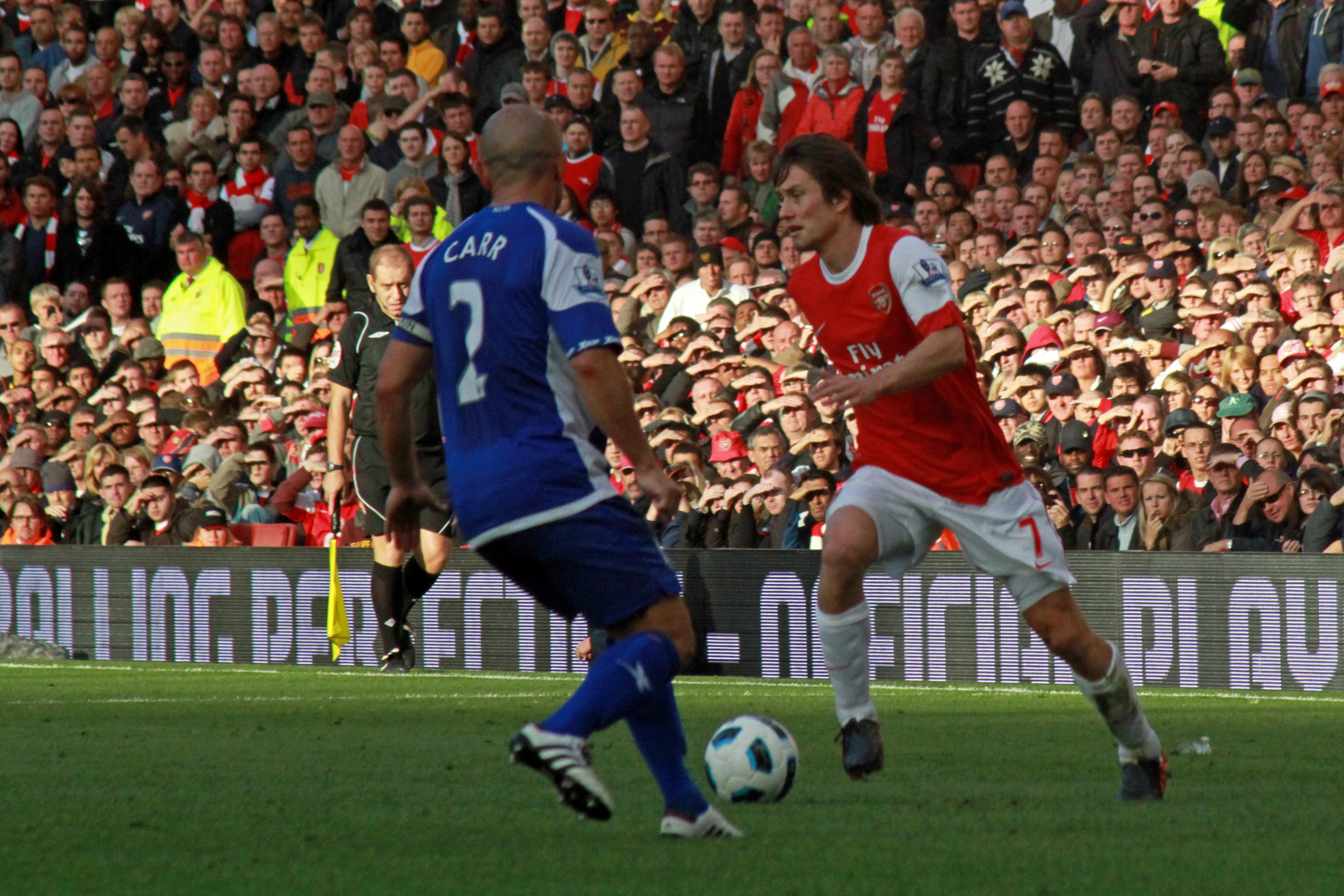
Rosický (right) playing in the Premier League against Birmingham City in October 2010

On 15 August 2010, in the first Premier League match of the 2010–11 season, Rosický was brought on as a substitute when Arsenal were trailing by a goal to Liverpool at Anfield, producing a cross in the 89th minute that was diverted by Marouane Chamakh against the post. The ball then hit Liverpool goalkeeper Pepe Reina before crossing the line for the equalising goal as the game finished 1–1. He scored his only goal of the season in an FA Cup tie away to League One side Leyton Orient at Brisbane Road on 20 February 2011 with a 53rd-minute header, although the match finished in a 1–1 draw. On 27 February 2011, Rosický started the 2011 League Cup Final against Birmingham City at Wembley, playing the full 90 minutes as Arsenal were defeated 2–1. At the end of the campaign, Rosický had scored one goal and made 34 appearances in all competitions for the Gunners.

==== 2011–12 season ====
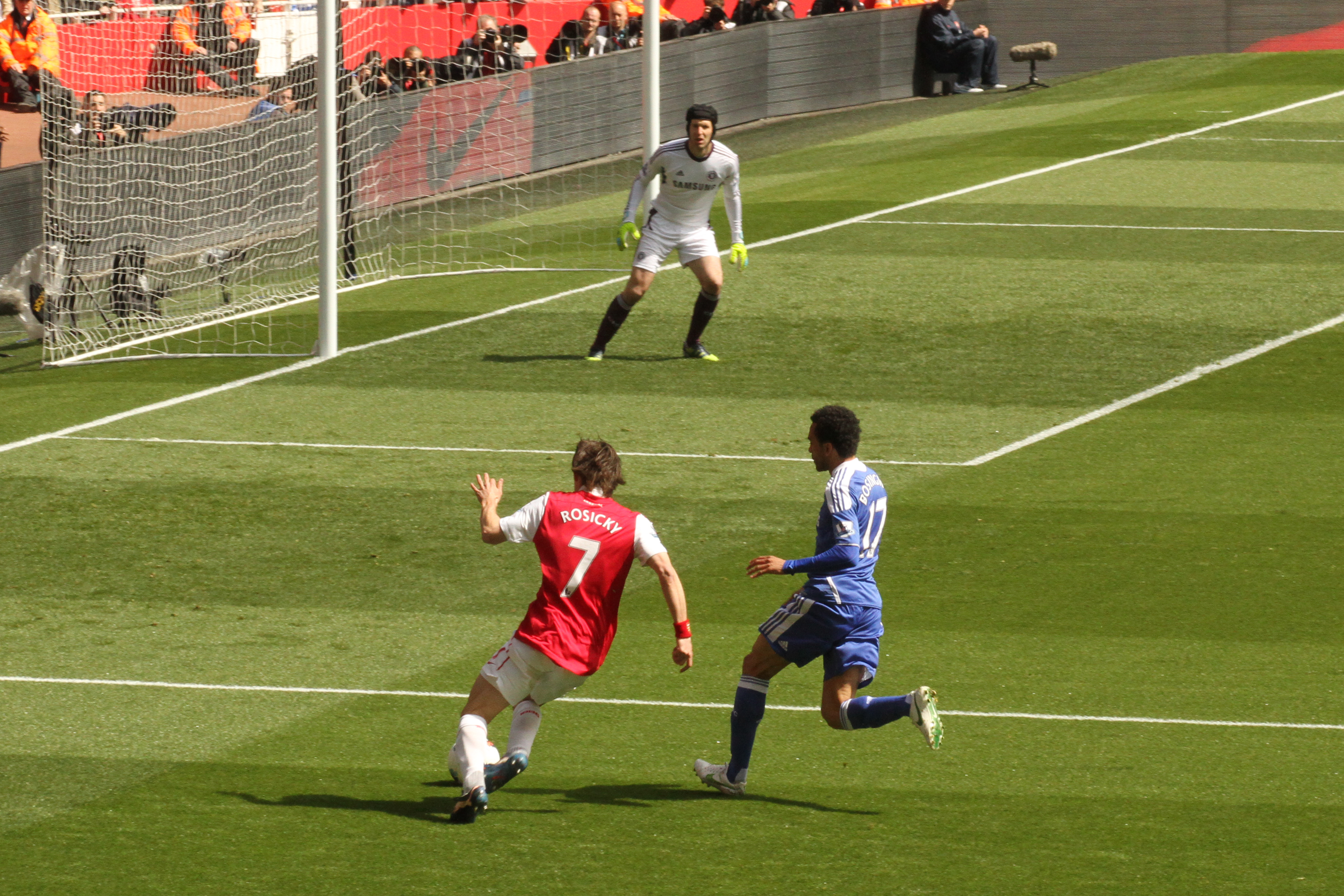
Rosický attacking against Chelsea in April 2012

On 16 October 2011, Rosický took part in a league game against Sunderland and was involved in the build-up play leading to Robin van Persie scoring the game's first goal after just 28 seconds, a game which finished 2–1 to Arsenal. His first goal of the 2011–12 season was in late February 2012 against Tottenham Hotspur. After Spurs had taken a two-goal lead, Arsenal scored five times, with Rosický scoring Arsenal's third, as they won 5–2. In early March, Rosický scored his team's second goal in a 3–0 Champions League home win against A.C. Milan, putting in a performance which was described by manager Arsène Wenger as "outstanding." Despite the win, the club were eliminated from the competition on aggregate, having been defeated 4–0 in the previous match.

Having been linked with a move to German side VfL Wolfsburg, Rosický signed a new contract with Arsenal on 12 March 2012, extending his stay at the club for another two years. Rosický's performance during Arsenal's next game, a 2–1 victory against Newcastle United, was described by Michael Da Silva of the BBC as "another impressive game" for the midfielder, although noted that he had been "guilty of a glaring miss halfway through the second half." He sustained an injury in Arsenal's final match of the season, pulling a muscle in the game with West Bromwich Albion.

==== 2012–13 season ====
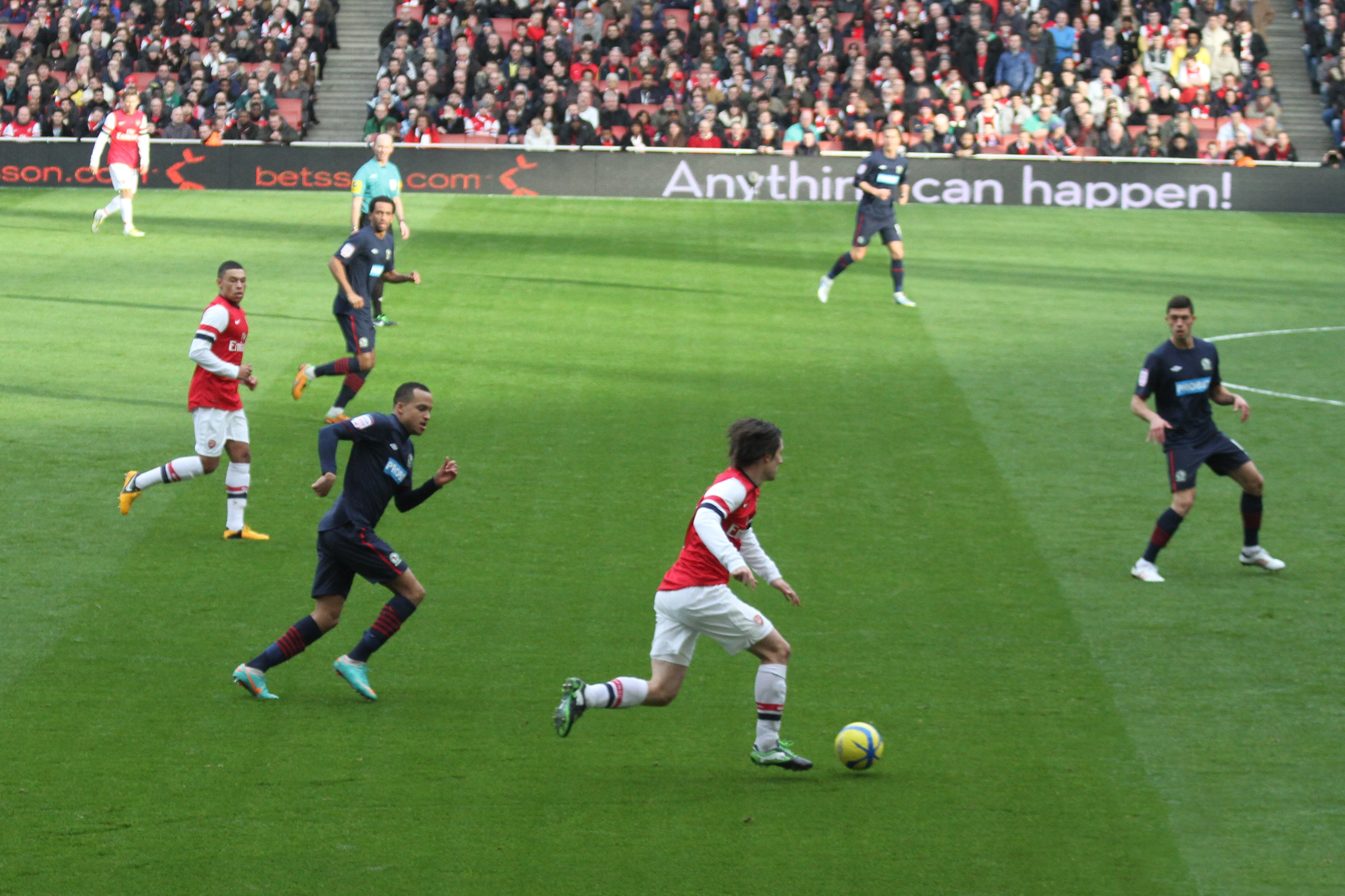
Rosický in possession against Blackburn Rovers in February 2013

After picking up a serious injury to his achilles tendon at Euro 2012, Rosický made his first club appearance of the 2012–13 season in Arsenal's 2–0 home defeat against Swansea City on 1 December 2012. He played in the Champions League three days later, scoring Arsenal's only goal in a 2–1 loss against Olympiacos in Greece. In April 2013, he scored both of Arsenal's goals in their 2–1 away victory against West Brom. He managed 16 competitive appearances for Arsenal, scoring three times in the 2012–13 season.

==== 2013–14 season ====
On 4 January 2014, Rosický scored his first goal of the season in a 2–0 win in the FA Cup against Tottenham Hotspur, winning the ball on the halfway line from Danny Rose before running to the goal and beating opposition goalkeeper Hugo Lloris. During the 2–1 victory against Aston Villa just over a week later, his nose was broken in two places after a challenge by Gabriel Agbonlahor, requiring surgery after the incident. February saw Rosický score "one of the best [goals] we have scored," according to Wenger, in a 4–1 league victory against Sunderland.

In March 2014, Rosický signed a contract extension with the Gunners, keeping him at the club for an additional two years. Later that month, Rosický scored Arsenal's winning goal in a 1–0 North London Derby victory for Arsenal, against Tottenham, at White Hart Lane. Rosický concluded the season by winning his first trophy in English football, coming on as a substitute for Santi Cazorla for the second half of extra time in the 2014 FA Cup Final as Arsenal beat Hull City 3–2 at Wembley.

==== 2014–15 season ====
Rosický began the season with his second piece of silverware for Arsenal, playing the last 20 minutes of the 3–0 win over Manchester City in the 2014 FA Community Shield, in place of Santi Cazorla. In his first league start of the season, on 26 December 2014, Rosický scored Arsenal's second goal in a 2–1 home win against Queens Park Rangers, set up by Alexis Sánchez.

On 25 January 2015, Rosický captained Arsenal to a 3–2 win away at Brighton & Hove Albion in the fourth round of the FA Cup, where he scored the team's third goal, assisted Mesut Özil's goal and was named man of the match. Arsenal finished the season by winning the FA Cup, although Rosický did not take part in the final.

==== 2015–16 season ====
Having missed the first half of the 2015–16 season as a result of a serious knee injury, Rosický finally made his first appearance on 30 January in a FA Cup tie with Burnley. After the match, it was revealed that he had suffered a thigh injury during the encounter, with the result that he would spend at least another month on the sidelines. It was announced on the final day of the season that Rosický would end his ten-year stay with Arsenal, and would leave upon the expiry of his contract in July 2016. On 15 May, he received a guard of honour after Arsenal's 4–0 final day victory against Aston Villa, with the majority of the Arsenal squad wearing his 'Rosický 7' jersey.

=== Return to Sparta Prague and retirement ===
On 30 August 2016, Rosický announced a return to Sparta Prague. He made his second debut for Sparta on 10 September 2016 as a substitute in a 2–2 draw with Mladá Boleslav in a Czech First League game; However, he sustained an injury during that same match and was eventually ruled out for the rest of the 2016–17 Czech First League season.

On 10 September 2017, Rosický returned to Sparta Prague's starting line up after seventeen years away and scored the winning goal of the game against Karviná.

On 20 December 2017, Rosický announced his retirement from professional football aged 37, due to persistent injuries hampering his physical condition. He made 12 competitive appearances for Sparta in his final campaign.

== International career ==
=== Early senior career ===
On 23 February 2000, Rosický made his international debut for the Czech Republic in a friendly match against the Republic of Ireland, replacing Pavel Nedvěd at the 83rd minute. He scored his first goal on 6 October 2001 in another friendly match against Bulgaria.

Rosický was named in the Czech Republic's provisional 26-man squad for UEFA Euro 2000. He played in his nation's first two matches at Euro 2000 during Patrik Berger's international suspension – both losses – before Berger replaced him ahead of the Czech Republic's final game, against Denmark.

=== 2002 FIFA World Cup and UEFA Euro 2004 ===
Rosický took part in qualification for the 2002 World Cup, scoring twice in a 6–0 victory against Bulgaria. Due to suspension, Rosický could not part in the first game, a 1–0 loss. In the second match, he played in the 1–0 loss as Belgium qualified for the 2002 World Cup at the Czechs' expense.

Rosický played a prominent role at Euro 2004 where the Czech team defeated Netherlands and Denmark but surprisingly lost to eventual winners Greece in the semi-finals. He helped the side qualify for the 2006 FIFA World Cup in Germany, scoring seven times in 12 matches during the qualifying process; the last of these was the only goal of the second leg of the Czech Republic's play-off against Norway, ensuring qualification for the finals.

=== 2006 ===
At the 2006 World Cup, Rosický scored two goals in the Czech Republic's opening match on 12 June 2006 in a 3–0 victory over the United States, the first of which was from 30 yards (27 m) out. He was named as the FIFA Man of the Match for his performance. Rosický played the whole 90 minutes of his country's subsequent matches, against Ghana and Italy, but the Czech Republic lost both games by a 2–0 scoreline and progressed no further in the tournament.

In August 2006, Rosický was made captain of the Czech Republic national side, replacing the retiring Pavel Nedvěd in advance of the UEFA Euro 2008 qualifying process. After a defeat to Germany during the campaign in March 2007, he was among a group of players fined 1 million koruna (£25,000) by the Football Association of the Czech Republic (FAČR) for his part in a party involving prostitutes, for which he later apologised in a press conference. His last appearance of the qualifying campaign was against Slovakia in November 2007. Rosický missed the UEFA Euro 2008 due to injury, announcing his absence in May 2008. Following one-year absence of injury, he returned to international football when he started for the Czech Republic on 9 September 2009 in a World Cup qualifier against San Marino. The game finished 7–0 to the Czech Republic.

=== 2010s: 100 appearances and retirement ===
Rosický served as captain of the Czech Republic football team in their opening two matches at UEFA Euro 2012, but an achilles tendon injury in a 2–1 victory against Greece ended his tournament, as the Czechs were eliminated in the quarter-finals by Portugal.

On 12 June 2015, Rosický earned his 100th international cap in a 2–1 defeat away to Iceland in UEFA Euro 2016 qualifying. The following year on 13 June at the Euro 2016, he became the oldest player to represent Czech Republic in the competition at the age of 35. The record is unique for Rosický as he also holds the record for being the youngest player to have done so, having featured at the UEFA Euro 2000 for his nation at 19 years old.

Rosický retired from international football on 20 December 2017, stating struggles with injuries and that his body could not match the highest fitness level.

== Functionary career ==
In January 2018 Rosický became assistant of the new AC Sparta Prague sporting director Zdeněk Ščasný. On 17 December 2018 he replaced Ščasný as sporting director, soon after Ščasný moved to the position of Sparta head coach.

== Style of play ==
Ahead of his first senior international tournament (Euro 2000), Rosický was described by the BBC as "a solid playmaker." Arsenal manager Arsène Wenger described Rosický as having "great technique, skill on the ball and sharp passing." Upon signing a contract extension in 2010, Wenger called him a "special talent" and said his "vision and touch is remarkable." Announcing Rosický's 2012 contract extension, Wenger called him "technically top class".

Rosický is also well known for preferring to use the outside of his foot for passing and shooting. In Germany, he gained the nickname "The Little Mozart" for his ability to orchestrate play on the pitch. David Hytner of The Guardian described him as "the all-round midfielder who brings balance, organisation and urgency to the team."

== Personal life ==
Rosický is the son of former league footballer Jiří Rosický, who played as a defender in a career spanning 15 years. Tomáš' son, named Tomáš, was born to girlfriend Radka Kocurová in June 2013. He married Kocurova in May 2014 after having been in a relationship with her for 11 years. He played guitar during a live performance with rock band Tři sestry in March 2010, having practised his guitar skills during his 18 months on the sidelines because of his hamstring injury.

In May 2025, Rosický was unexpectedly hospitalized in the intensive care unit due to heart-related issues.

== Career statistics ==
=== Club ===
Appearances and goals by club, season and competition
Club	Season	League			National cup (Note: Includes Czech FA Cup, German FA Cup, and English FA Cup.)		League cup (Note: Includes German League Cup and English League Cup.)		Continental (Note: Includes UEFA Champions League, UEFA Cup/Europa League, and UEFA Intertoto Cup.)		Other (Note: Includes FA Community Shield.)		Total	
Club	Season	Division	Apps	Goals	Apps	Goals	Apps	Goals	Apps	Goals	Apps	Goals	Apps	Goals
Sparta Prague	1998–99	Czech First League	3	0	2	0	—		0	0	—		5	0
Sparta Prague	1999–2000	Czech First League	24	5	2	1	—		12	2	—		38	8
Sparta Prague	2000–01	Czech First League	14	3	2	0	—		8	2	—		24	5
Sparta Prague	Total		41	8	6	1	0	0	20	4	0	0	67	13
Borussia Dortmund	2000–01	Bundesliga	15	0	0	0	—		—		—		15	0
Borussia Dortmund	2001–02	Bundesliga	30	5	1	0	2	0	16	1	—		49	6
Borussia Dortmund	2002–03	Bundesliga	30	4	1	0	1	0	7	2	—		39	6
Borussia Dortmund	2003–04	Bundesliga	19	2	1	0	3	1	4	0	—		27	3
Borussia Dortmund	2004–05	Bundesliga	27	4	2	0	—		0	0	—		29	4
Borussia Dortmund	2005–06	Bundesliga	28	5	0	0	—		2	0	—		30	5
Borussia Dortmund	Total		149	20	5	0	6	1	29	3	0	0	189	24
Arsenal	2006–07	Premier League	26	3	4	2	1	0	6	1	—		37	6
Arsenal	2007–08	Premier League	18	6	1	0	1	0	5	1	—		25	7
Arsenal	2008–09	Premier League	0	0	0	0	0	0	0	0	—		0	0
Arsenal	2009–10	Premier League	25	3	0	0	1	0	7	0	—		33	3
Arsenal	2010–11	Premier League	21	0	5	1	3	0	5	0	—		34	1
Arsenal	2011–12	Premier League	28	1	2	0	0	0	8	1	—		38	2
Arsenal	2012–13	Premier League	10	2	2	0	1	0	3	1	0	0	16	3
Arsenal	2013–14	Premier League	27	2	3	1	1	0	8	0	—		39	3
Arsenal	2014–15	Premier League	15	2	3	1	1	0	4	0	1	0	24	3
Arsenal	2015–16	Premier League	0	0	1	0	0	0	0	0	0	0	1	0
Arsenal	Total		170	19	21	5	9	0	46	4	1	0	247	28
Sparta Prague	2016–17	Czech First League	1	0	0	0	—		0	0	—		1	0
Sparta Prague	2017–18	Czech First League	11	1	0	0	—		1	0	—		12	1
Sparta Prague	Total		12	1	0	0	0	0	1	0	0	0	13	1
Career total			372	48	32	6	15	1	96	11	1	0	516	66

=== International ===
Appearances and goals by national team and year
National team	Year	Apps	Goals
Czech Republic	2000	8	0
Czech Republic	2001	10	2
Czech Republic	2002	6	3
Czech Republic	2003	7	1
Czech Republic	2004	13	3
Czech Republic	2005	8	6
Czech Republic	2006	9	2
Czech Republic	2007	7	2
Czech Republic	2008	0	0
Czech Republic	2009	3	0
Czech Republic	2010	6	0
Czech Republic	2011	8	1
Czech Republic	2012	2	0
Czech Republic	2013	6	1
Czech Republic	2014	5	1
Czech Republic	2015	2	0
Czech Republic	2016	5	1
Total		105	23

Scores and results list Czech Republic's goal tally first, score column indicates score after each Rosický goal.

List of international goals scored by Tomáš Rosický
No.	Date	Venue	Cap	Opponent	Score	Result	Competition
1	6 October 2001	Generali Arena, Prague, Czech Republic	14	Bulgaria	1–0	6–0	2002 FIFA World Cup qualification
2	6 October 2001	Generali Arena, Prague, Czech Republic	14	Bulgaria	5–0	6–0	2002 FIFA World Cup qualification
3	20 August 2002	Andrův stadion, Olomouc, Czech Republic	18	Slovakia	3–1	4–1	Friendly
4	20 August 2002	Andrův stadion, Olomouc, Czech Republic	18	Slovakia	4–1	4–1	Friendly
5	12 October 2002	Stadionul Republican, Chișinău, Moldova	20	Moldova	2–0	2–0	UEFA Euro 2004 qualifying
6	29 April 2003	Na Stínadlech, Teplice, Czech Republic	25	Turkey	1–0	4–0	Friendly
7	17 February 2004	Stadio Renzo Barbera, Palermo, Italy	29	Italy	2–2	2–2	Friendly
8	1 June 2004	Generali Arena, Prague, Czech Republic	31	Bulgaria	3–0	3–1	Friendly
9	13 October 2004	Vazgen Sargsyan Republican Stadium, Yerevan, Armenia	41	Armenia	2–0	3–0	2006 FIFA World Cup qualification
10	26 March 2005	Na Stínadlech, Teplice, Czech Republic	43	Finland	2–0	4–3	2006 FIFA World Cup qualification
11	30 March 2005	Estadi Comunal d'Andorra la Vella, Andorra la Vella, Andorra	44	Andorra	4–0	4–0	2006 FIFA World Cup qualification
12	4 June 2005	Stadion u Nisy, Liberec, Czech Republic	45	Andorra	6–1	8–1	2006 FIFA World Cup qualification
13	8 June 2005	Na Stínadlech, Teplice, Czech Republic	46	Macedonia	5–1	6–1	2006 FIFA World Cup qualification
14	12 October 2005	Helsinki Olympic Stadium, Helsinki, Finland	48	Finland	2–0	3–0	2006 FIFA World Cup qualification
15	16 November 2005	Generali Arena, Prague, Czech Republic	50	Norway	1–0	1–0	2006 FIFA World Cup qualification
16	12 June 2006	Veltins-Arena, Gelsenkirchen, Germany	53	United States	2–0	3–0	2006 FIFA World Cup
17	12 June 2006	Veltins-Arena, Gelsenkirchen, Germany	53	United States	3–0	3–0	2006 FIFA World Cup
18	8 September 2007	San Marino Stadium, Serravalle, San Marino	64	San Marino	1–0	3–0	UEFA Euro 2008 qualifying
19	17 November 2007	Generali Arena, Prague, Czech Republic	66	Slovakia	3–1	3–1	UEFA Euro 2008 qualifying
20	9 February 2011	Stadion Aldo Drosina, Pula, Croatia	76	Croatia	2–2	2–4	Friendly
21	6 September 2013	Eden Arena, Prague, Czech Republic	93	Armenia	1–1	1–2	2014 FIFA World Cup qualification
22	5 March 2014	Eden Arena, Prague, Czech Republic	95	Norway	1–0	2–2	Friendly
23	1 June 2016	Tivoli-Neu, Innsbruck, Austria	102	Russia	1–1	2–1	Friendly

== Honours ==
Sparta Prague

- Czech First League: 1998–99, 1999–2000

Borussia Dortmund

- Bundesliga: 2001–02
- UEFA Cup runner-up: 2001–02
- DFB-Ligapokal runner-up: 2003

Arsenal

- FA Cup: 2013–14, 2014–15
- FA Community Shield: 2014
- Football League Cup runner-up: 2006–07, 2010–11

Individual

- Czech Footballer of the Year: 2001, 2002, 2006
- Golden Ball (Czech Republic): 2002
- Czech Talent of the Year: 1999
- kicker Bundesliga Team of the Season: 2001–02

== See also ==
- List of footballers with 100 or more caps
