= Golden Ball (Czech Republic) =

Football award for Czech players

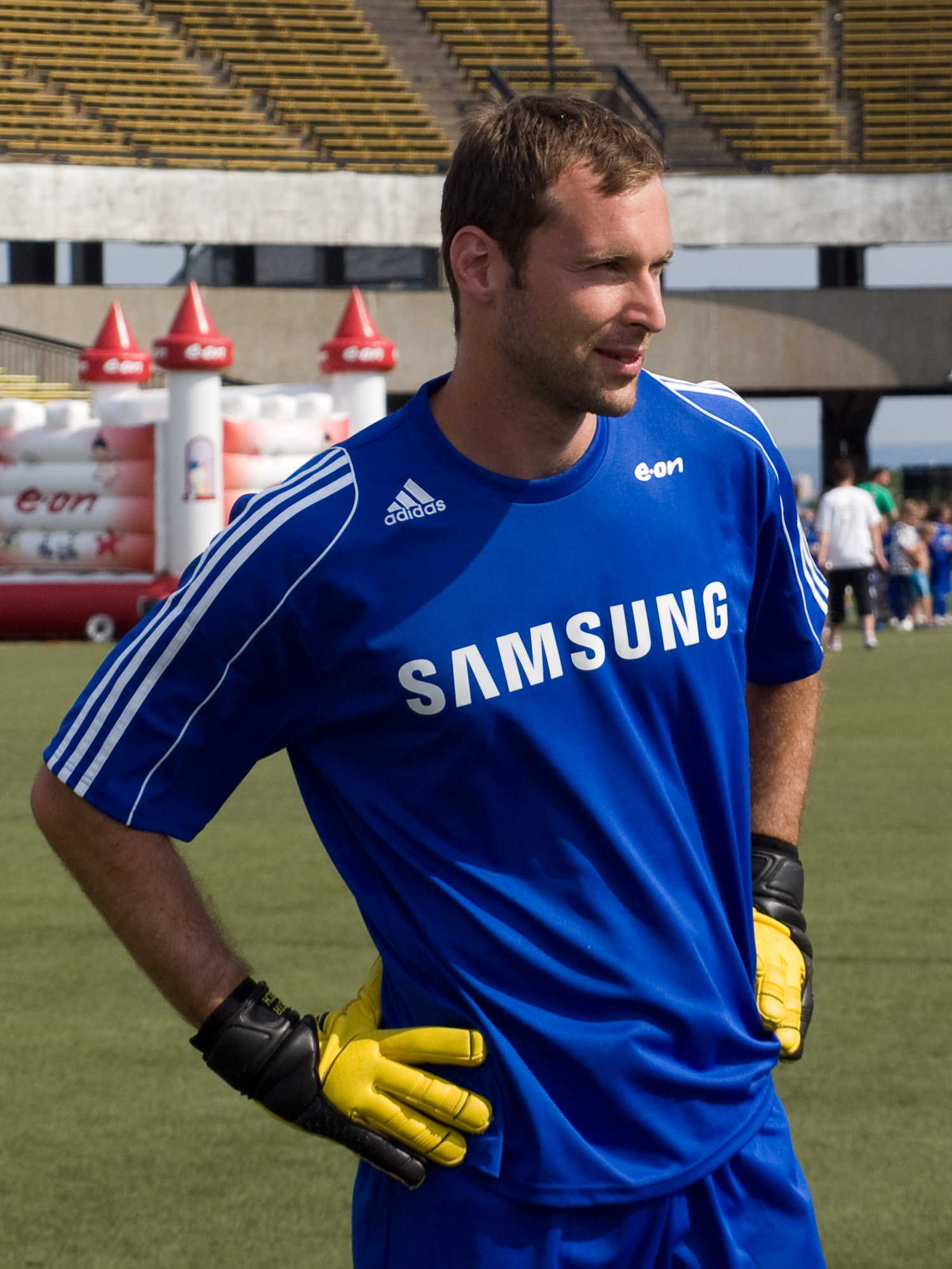
An image of Petr Čech, who won 8 times by 2013

The Golden Ball (Czech: Zlatý míč) is awarded in the Czech Republic by a poll of Czech sport journalists from the Club of Sport Journalists (Klub sportovních novinářů, KSN). The award is eligible to Czech players in the Czech Republic and abroad. Awards for young player and coach of the year are also given. The award for the Coach of the Year is named after Rudolf Vytlačil, a successful Czechoslovak coach. Petr Čech won his eighth Zlatý míč in nine years in 2013.

The other football award in the Czech Republic is the Czech Footballer of the Year awarded by the Football Association of the Czech Republic (FAČR).

== Winners ==
Year	Golden Ball	Revelation of the Year	Coach of the Year
2026	Patrik Schick (Bayer 04 Leverkusen)		
2025	Pavel Šulc (Viktoria Plzeň)		
2024	Tomáš Souček (West Ham United)		
2023	Tomáš Souček (West Ham United)		
2022	Patrik Schick (Bayer 04 Leverkusen)		
2021	Tomáš Souček (West Ham United)		
2020	Tomáš Souček (West Ham United)		
2019	Tomáš Vaclík (Sevilla)		
2018	Petr Čech (Arsenal)		
2017	Petr Čech (Arsenal)		
2016	Petr Čech (Arsenal)		
2015	David Lafata (Sparta Prague)		
2014	Petr Čech (Chelsea)		
2013	Petr Čech (Chelsea)	Stanislav Tecl (Vysočina Jihlava/Viktoria Plzeň)	Vítězslav Lavička (AC Sparta Prague)
2012	Petr Čech (Chelsea)	?	?
2011	Petr Čech (Chelsea)	?	?
2010	Petr Čech (Chelsea)	Matěj Vydra (Baník Ostrava)	František Komňacký (FK Jablonec)
2009	Pavel Nedvěd (Juventus)	Jan Chramosta (FK Mladá Boleslav)	Karel Jarolím (Slavia Prague)
2008	Petr Čech (Chelsea)	František Dřížďal (Slavia Prague)	Karel Jarolím (Slavia Prague)
2007	Petr Čech (Chelsea)	Zdeněk Zlámal (Tescoma Zlín/Slovan Liberec)	Vítězslav Lavička (Slovan Liberec)
2006	Petr Čech (Chelsea)	Marek Suchý (Slavia Prague)	Vítězslav Lavička (Slovan Liberec)
2005	Petr Čech (Chelsea)	Roman Bednář (Mladá Boleslav)	Karel Brückner (Czech national team)
2004	Pavel Nedvěd (Juventus)	Filip Dort (Opava)	František Komňacký (Baník Ostrava)
2003	Pavel Nedvěd (Juventus)	Mario Lička (Baník Ostrava)	Karel Brückner (Czech national team)
2002	Tomáš Rosický (Borussia Dortmund)	Rudolf Skácel (Hradec Králové/Slavia Prague)	Ladislav Škorpil (Slovan Liberec)
2001	Pavel Nedvěd (Lazio)	-	-
2000	Pavel Nedvěd (Lazio)	-	-
1999	Patrik Berger (Liverpool)	-	-
1998	Pavel Nedvěd (Lazio)	-	-
1997	Jiří Němec (Schalke 04)	-	-
