= Patrik Berger =

Czech footballer (born 1973)

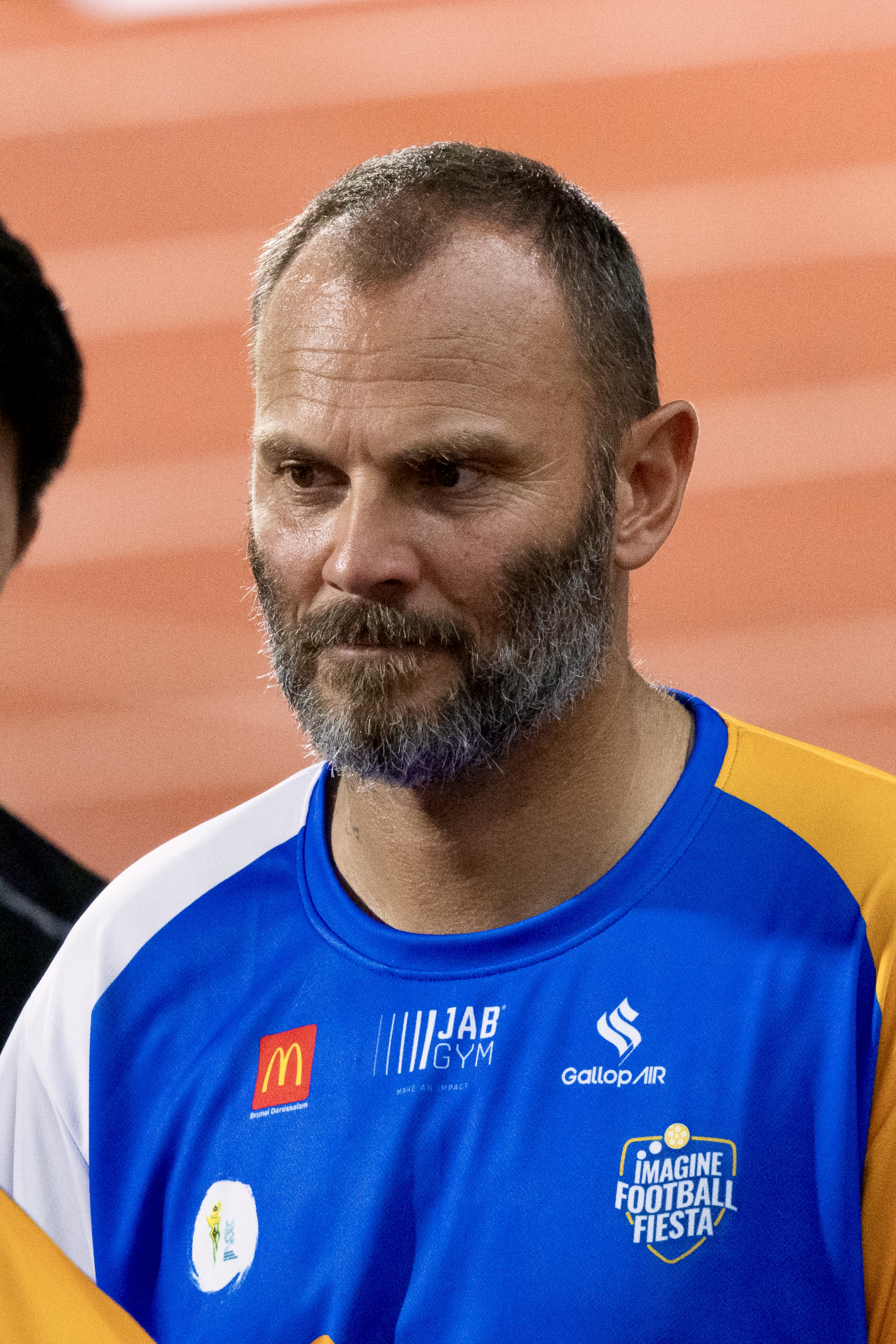
- Berger in 2024

Personal information
- Full name: Patrik Berger
- Date of birth: 10 November 1973 (age 53)
- Place of birth: Prague, Czechoslovakia
- Height: 1.85 m (6 ft 1 in)
- Positions: Left winger; attacking midfielder

Youth career
- 1989–1991: Sparta Prague

Senior career*
Years	Team	Apps	(Gls)
1991–1995	Slavia Prague	90	(24)
1995–1996	Borussia Dortmund	27	(4)
1996–2003	Liverpool	148	(28)
2003–2005	Portsmouth	52	(8)
2005–2008	Aston Villa	29	(2)
2006–2007	→ Stoke City (loan)	7	(0)
2008–2010	Sparta Prague	23	(6)
Total		376	(72)

International career
1994	Czech Republic U21	1	(3)
1993	RCS	2	(0)
1994–2001	Czech Republic	42	(18)
Medal record
Men's football
Representing Czech Republic
UEFA European Championship
Runner-up	1996 England
UEFA Euro U-16
Winner	1990 East Germany
- * Club domestic league appearances and goals

Patrik Berger (Czech pronunciation: [ˈpatrɪk ˈbɛrɡr̩]; born 10 November 1973) is a Czech former professional footballer who played as a midfielder. He started his career in his own country with Slavia Prague and spent a season in Germany playing for Borussia Dortmund. He moved to England in 1996, where he spent seven years with Liverpool, winning four trophies in his time there. This was followed by spells at Portsmouth, Aston Villa and Stoke City. He spent the last two years of his career back in his native Czech Republic playing for Sparta Prague.

Internationally, Berger played in two major tournaments for the Czech Republic. He played an important part in his nation's Euro 1996 campaign, scoring in the final as the Czech Republic finished runners-up to Germany. He took a 17-month break from the national team between 1997 and 1998 after a dispute with manager Dušan Uhrin, returning to the setup following Uhrin's departure from the post. His second and final major tournament was Euro 2000, but due to suspension and his country's early exit, he only played one match. He retired from the national team in 2002 at the age of 28 with a total of 44 senior international caps and 18 goals.

Capable of occupying midfield and forward positions, Berger became noted for his powerful strikes, surging runs, and strong left foot. Berger was beset with injuries throughout his career and received specialist treatment in the United States. He retired on 6 January 2010 due to knee injuries.

== Personal life ==
Berger was born in Prague, Czechoslovakia. His uncle is the Czech footballer Jan Berger. He married wife Jaroslava, and has two children, son Patrik and daughter Valentýnka. He gained a British passport in 2001 after having spent five years playing club football in England. This enabled him to play without needing a work permit, which he had previously required due to the Premier League's rules on non-EU players.

== Club career ==
=== Early career ===
He began his footballing career as a youth player at Sparta Prague in 1989, securing a professional contract two years later with rivals Slavia Prague. Establishing himself as a senior regular, Berger competed in Europe and earned selection for Czechoslovakia and, following its establishment, the Czech Republic.

=== Borussia Dortmund ===
After 90 league appearances and 24 goals, Berger was purchased by Ottmar Hitzfeld's Borussia Dortmund in 1995 for a reported £500,000. In August 1995 he played in the DFL-Supercup, as Dortmund beat Borussia Mönchengladbach to win the title. While Dortmund went on to win the Bundesliga title in the 1995–96 season, Berger was frequently used as a substitute, making 14 of his 27 league appearances from the bench. Hitzfeld preferred to employ Berger as a defensive midfielder as he considered him to be most suited to the role. Berger scored four goals for Dortmund in the German top-flight.

Liverpool's interest in Berger was stimulated by the performances of the Czech Republic during Euro 1996, organised in England, where he scored a penalty in the final. The club approached both Berger and Karel Poborský, who elected to transfer to Manchester United after the competition's conclusion. Berger did accept Liverpool's contract offer and completed his transfer in August 1996 for £3.25 million.

=== Liverpool ===
Berger and his family settled in Southport, Merseyside, where they resided near retired players Kenny Dalglish and Alan Hansen. Debuting as a substitute in a 2–1 home win against Southampton on 7 September 1996, Berger performed well in his first month with the club, endearing him to supporters and earning praise from colleagues. In his second match, he replaced Stan Collymore as half time substitute, going on to score two goals in a 3–0 win against Leicester City. A second double was registered against Chelsea in the latter's 5–1 defeat at Anfield, which he followed with a fifth goal in four matches in a Cup Winners' Cup match against MYPA. The series of displays were recognised in October 1996 with the FA's Player of the Month award for September.

First-team opportunities became limited in Berger's second season. Despite scoring a hat-trick against Chelsea in October 1997, he often found himself named as a substitute. His dissatisfaction at manager Roy Evans placed his Liverpool career in jeopardy. Evans criticised Berger's perceived indifference to teamwork and publicly expressed a willingness to sell after he refused to be used as a substitute against Bolton Wanderers in March 1998. Berger was linked with a move away from Liverpool in May 1998, with Italian club Roma, the manager of which was his countryman Zdeněk Zeman, and Portuguese club Benfica both mentioned as possible destinations. The appointment of Gérard Houllier as co-manager before the 1998–99 season and subsequent departure of Evans proved to be pivotal in Berger's decision to remain with the club.

You know, the greatest day in my football life was the day I signed for Liverpool. I couldn't believe it. When I was young in Czechoslovakia, we didn't see much European football, but my father's friend went to England and he watched Liverpool. When he came back, he gave me the programme, the ticket and a scarf. I still have them all.

When I moved to Southport to live, my neighbour was Kenny Dalglish. Alan Hansen lived around the corner. I met them, they were normal guys, but they were my heroes. To me, it's the best club in the world and when I am finished playing and I'm telling my children about it I will be proud to say that for seven years I was a Liverpool player.

The Sunday Times, 8 February 2004.

Playing regularly in his first season under Houllier's reign, Berger scored nine goals and improved as a player. An injury sustained in a 4–3 defeat to Leeds United in November 2000 rendered Berger unavailable for much of the 2000–01 season and required specialist treatment in the United States from knee surgeon Richard Steadman. By March 2001, Berger had recovered and he went on to feature in the final of both the UEFA Cup and the FA Cup, with Liverpool winning both trophies. In the 2001 FA Cup Final, he provided the assist for Michael Owen to score the deciding goal against Arsenal.

He appeared in the 2001 FA Charity Shield, coming on as a substitute as Liverpool won the competition. He then underwent knee surgery in August 2001, ruling him out of the 2001 UEFA Super Cup.

Recurring injuries between 2001 and 2003 continued to disrupt Berger's career and deprived him of a presence in the first team, resulting in his decision to leave Liverpool after the expiration of his contract following the conclusion of the 2002–03 season. Berger had been confined to the bench for the duration of his final season when selected, limiting him to four appearances. He left Liverpool, having scored 35 goals during his seven seasons with the club.

=== Portsmouth ===
Newly promoted to the Premier League, Portsmouth manager Harry Redknapp signed Berger on a free transfer. Redknapp said of the deal: "Patrik's a quality player, free – and the type of player who'll bring good experience to Portsmouth. I had a bit of competition for him but he's looked round the area and is very happy to join us." Berger made his first appearance for Portsmouth on the opening day against Aston Villa; he scored the club's second goal. Berger scored the winning goal in Portsmouth's victory over his former club Liverpool in October 2003. A month later, he set up the first and fourth Portsmouth goals and scored the fifth in Portsmouth's 6–1 win against Leeds United. On Boxing Day 2003, Berger helped Portsmouth to a 2–0 win against Tottenham Hotspur, scoring both goals of the match from free kicks, the first of which was scored from 35 yards (32 m). Berger underwent an operation upon his knee in February 2004, forcing him to miss the remainder of the season.

Berger started the 2004–05 season with note, scoring August's contender for Goal of the Season against Charlton Athletic. His second goal of the campaign came in a 3–1 win away to Crystal Palace, striking from 25 yards (23 m). October 2004 saw his final league goal for Portsmouth in a 2–2 away draw at Norwich, scoring a 25-yard free kick.

The club endured a difficult end to the season, winning just once in a period of 12 matches, which prompted the appointment of Alain Perrin as Portsmouth's new manager. Berger was one of a number of players including Steve Stone and Shaka Hislop whose contracts were due to expire in the summer. Portsmouth successfully avoided relegation close to the end of the season, following a 2–0 loss away at Manchester City on 30 April. In spite of Portsmouth having retained their Premier League status, Berger then joined Aston Villa on a two-year deal, citing manager David O'Leary as the main reason for choosing Villa.

=== Aston Villa and Stoke City (loan) ===
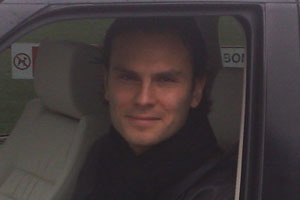
Berger in 2007

Berger was hampered by injury during his early Villa career, making few league appearances. During the first part of his second season, he only played two matches under new manager Martin O'Neill. In November 2006, he was sent to Championship club Stoke City on loan until 4 January 2007, following a fine of two weeks' wages for refusing to play in a reserve match. During his time at Stoke, he started just one match and took part in a further six as a substitute. Following his return from Stoke, Berger was commended by O'Neill on his fitness and on 7 April 2007, Berger started his first match for Villa since October 2005. He marked this occasion by scoring a goal in a 2–1 victory against Blackburn Rovers. Berger scored again on 5 May 2007 in the penultimate match of the season against Sheffield United. On 28 May 2007, Berger agreed to sign a one-year contract extension with Aston Villa.

Berger was injured in the pre-season of the 2007–08 Premier League, keeping him out of league matches until October 2007. He then suffered a recurrence of the same injury and was ruled out for a further period of time. On 6 May 2008, Berger was told he had played his last match for Aston Villa after urging captain Gareth Barry to move to Liverpool. This came just days after manager Martin O'Neill claimed he was "desperate" to keep Barry following interest from Premier League rivals Chelsea and Liverpool. At the end of his contract Berger was released by the club, having appeared in just 29 league matches in three seasons.

=== Return to Sparta Prague ===
On 29 May 2008, Berger returned to Prague as a free agent, signing a two-year contract with boyhood club Sparta Prague, also becoming captain of the club for the 2008–09 Gambrinus liga. In November 2008, Berger scored a hat-trick against SK Kladno in a 5–0 Sparta victory. Sparta went on to finish the season in second place, thus ensuring qualification for the following season's UEFA Champions League tournament. Berger was the club's top league goal scorer with six goals.

During the 2009–10 season, Berger played just two league matches before undergoing more knee surgery. On 6 January 2010 he announced his retirement after failing to recover from a ligament injury.

=== Post-professional career ===
Berger continued playing football on an amateur basis in August 2010 for sixth-tier Czech Republic club Dolní Chabry. At the age of 40 he was still playing for the team.

== International career ==
Berger represented the youth teams of Czechoslovakia from the under-15 level, working his way up through under-16, under-17 and under-18 between 1988 and 1991. For these junior teams he had a record of a total of six goals in 49 appearances. During this time, he won the 1990 UEFA European Under-16 Championship with the under-16 team, scoring in the final against Yugoslavia.

In a FIFA World Cup qualifier on 23 March 1993, Berger debuted for the Czechoslovakia against Cyprus, which ended in a 1–1 draw. In October 1995, he scored the second goal in a qualification match for Euro 1996 against Belarus, which the Czechs won 2–0.

Berger was part of the Czech Republic team who took part in Euro 1996, but Martin Frýdek was preferred to Berger in the starting lineup for the first match against Germany. Berger went on to play in all of his nation's matches in the tournament, scoring the famous penalty spot in the final to give the Czech Republic a 1–0 lead against Germany. However, the Czech Republic ultimately lost on the golden goal rule in extra time.

Between 1997 and 1998, Berger boycotted the Czech national team due to a conflict with head coach Dušan Uhrin. He returned to the national set-up after a 17-month absence following the appointment of Jozef Chovanec as Uhrin's replacement. He made a notable return to the national team, scoring two goals from free kicks in a qualification match against Estonia.

The next major international tournament Berger took part in was Euro 2000. Having been suspended for his nation's first two matches after being sent off in a qualifier against the Faroe Islands, Berger played just one match. Berger announced his retirement from international football in March 2002 at the age of 28.

== Style of play ==
Berger played mainly as an attacking midfielder, also being known as a winger. He became noted for his powerful strikes, surging runs, and strong left foot. Teammate at Liverpool Steven Gerrard said of Berger that "he was the best left-footed striker of a ball I have seen".

== Career statistics ==
=== Club ===
Appearances and goals by club, season and competition
Club	Season	League			National cup		League cup		Other		Total	
Club	Season	Division	Apps	Goals	Apps	Goals	Apps	Goals	Apps	Goals	Apps	Goals
Slavia Prague	1991–92	Czechoslovak First League	20	3	—		—		—		20	3
Slavia Prague	1992–93	Czechoslovak First League	29	10	—		—		2	0	31	10
Slavia Prague	1993–94	Czech First League	12	4	—		—		2	1	14	5
Slavia Prague	1994–95	Czech First League	29	7	—		—		4	1	33	8
Slavia Prague	Total		90	24	—		—		8	2	98	26
Borussia Dortmund	1995–96	Bundesliga	27	4	3	0	—		6	0	36	4
Liverpool	1996–97	Premier League	23	6	2	0	3	1	6	2	34	9
Liverpool	1997–98	Premier League	22	3	1	0	2	1	2	0	27	4
Liverpool	1998–99	Premier League	32	7	2	0	1	0	6	2	41	9
Liverpool	1999–2000	Premier League	34	9	1	0	2	0	—		37	9
Liverpool	2000–01	Premier League	14	2	1	0	1	0	5	0	21	2
Liverpool	2001–02	Premier League	21	1	1	0	0	0	9	0	31	1
Liverpool	2002–03	Premier League	2	0	0	0	1	1	1	0	4	1
Liverpool	Total		148	28	8	0	10	3	29	4	195	35
Portsmouth	2003–04	Premier League	20	5	1	0	2	0	—		23	5
Portsmouth	2004–05	Premier League	32	3	2	0	3	0	—		37	3
Portsmouth	Total		52	8	3	0	5	0	—		60	8
Aston Villa	2005–06	Premier League	8	0	0	0	1	0	—		9	0
Aston Villa	2006–07	Premier League	13	2	0	0	1	0	—		14	2
Aston Villa	2007–08	Premier League	8	0	0	0	1	0	—		9	0
Aston Villa	Total		29	2	0	0	3	0	—		32	2
Stoke City (loan)	2006–07	Championship	7	0	0	0	—		—		7	0
Sparta Prague	2008–09	Czech First League	21	6	4	2	—		4	0	29	8
Sparta Prague	2009–10	Czech First League	2	0	0	0	—		1	0	3	0
Sparta Prague	Total		23	6	4	2	—		5	0	32	8
Career total			376	72	18	2	18	3	48	6	460	83

=== International ===
Appearances and goals by national team and year
National team	Year	Apps	Goals
Czechoslovakia	1993	2	0
Total		2	0
Czech Republic	1994	3	1
Czech Republic	1995	7	7
Czech Republic	1996	12	3
Czech Republic	1997	2	1
Czech Republic	1998	4	2
Czech Republic	1999	7	3
Czech Republic	2000	3	1
Czech Republic	2001	4	0
Total		42	18

Scores and results list Czech Republic's goal tally first, score column indicates score after each Berger goal.

List of international goals scored by Patrik Berger
No.	Date	Venue	Opponent	Score	Result	Competition	Ref.
1	6 September 1994	Bazaly, Ostrava, Czech Republic	Malta	6–1	6–1	UEFA Euro 1996 qualifying	
2	8 March 1995	Za Lužánkami Stadium, Brno, Czech Republic	Finland	1–0	4–1	Friendly	
3	8 March 1995	Za Lužánkami Stadium, Brno, Czech Republic	Finland	2–0	4–1	Friendly	
4	29 March 1995	Bazaly, Ostrava, Czech Republic	Belarus	2–0	4–2	UEFA Euro 1996 qualifying	
5	29 March 1995	Bazaly, Ostrava, Czech Republic	Belarus	3–1	4–2	UEFA Euro 1996 qualifying	
6	26 April 1995	Letná Stadium, Prague, Czech Republic	Netherlands	3–1	3–1	UEFA Euro 1996 qualifying	
7	7 October 1995	Dinamo Stadium, Minsk, Belarus	Belarus	2–0	2–0	UEFA Euro 1996 qualifying	
8	15 November 1995	Letná Stadium, Prague, Czech Republic	Luxembourg	3–0	3–0	UEFA Euro 1996 qualifying	
9	30 June 1996	Wembley Stadium, London, England	Germany	1–0	1–2	UEFA Euro 1996	
10	18 September 1996	Na Stínadlech, Teplice, Czech Republic	Malta	1–0	6–0	1998 FIFA World Cup qualification	
11	18 September 1996	Na Stínadlech, Teplice, Czech Republic	Malta	3–0	6–0	1998 FIFA World Cup qualification	
12	26 February 1997	Poděbrady, Czech Republic	Belarus	4–1	4–1	Friendly	
13	14 November 1998	Na Stínadlech, Teplice, Czech Republic	Estonia	2–0	4–1	UEFA Euro 2000 qualifying	
14	14 November 1998	Na Stínadlech, Teplice, Czech Republic	Estonia	3–0	4–1	UEFA Euro 2000 qualifying	
15	27 March 1999	Na Stínadlech, Teplice, Czech Republic	Lithuania	2–0	2–0	UEFA Euro 2000 qualifying	
16	5 June 1999	Kadriorg Stadium, Tallinn, Estonia	Estonia	1–0	2–0	UEFA Euro 2000 qualifying	
17	8 September 1999	Na Stínadlech, Teplice, Czech Republic	Bosnia and Herzegovina	2–0	3–0	UEFA Euro 2000 qualifying	
18	3 June 2000	Frankenstadion, Nuremberg, Germany	Germany	2–2	2–3	Friendly	

== Honours ==
Borussia Dortmund

- Bundesliga: 1995–96
- DFB-Supercup: 1995

Liverpool

- FA Cup: 2000–01
- FA Charity Shield: 2001
- UEFA Cup: 2000–01

Individual

- Premier League Player of the Month: September 1996
- Czech Footballer of the Year: 1996 (shared with Karel Poborský)
- Czech Golden Ball: 1999
