= František Dřížďal =

Czech footballer (born 1978)

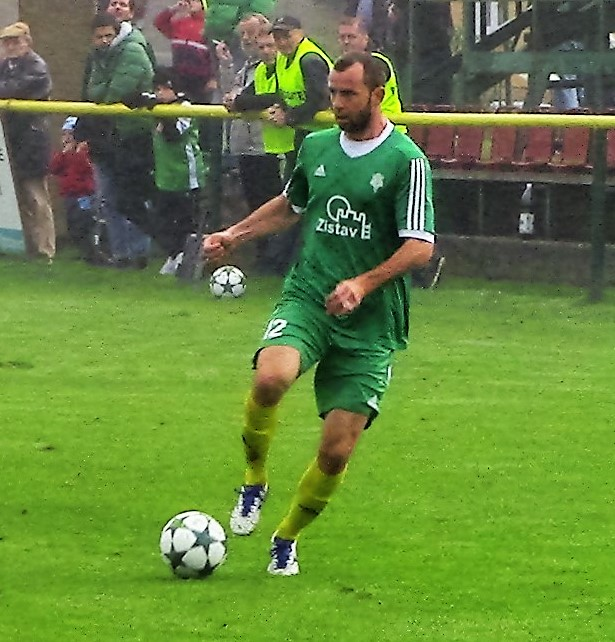
- Dřížďal in 2016

Personal information
- Date of birth: 8 August 1978 (age 48)
- Place of birth: Sokolov, Czechoslovakia
- Height: 1.84 m (6 ft 0 in)
- Position: Full-back

Youth career
- 1984–1998: Spartak Horní Slavkov

Senior career*
Years	Team	Apps	(Gls)
1998–2003	Buldoci Karlovy Vary		
2003–2004	FC Maxhütte-Haidhof		
2004–2007	Baník Sokolov		
2007–2009	SK Slavia Praha	21	(1)
2009–2010	1. FC Brno	21	(0)
2011–2016	FK Baník Sokolov	35	(0)
2016–2017	1. FC Karlovy Vary		
- * Club domestic league appearances and goals as of 27 May 2020

František Dřížďal (born 8 August 1978) is a Czech footballer.

In 2008, Dřížďal was voted "Revelation of the Year" at the Golden Ball awards.
