= Filip Dort =

Czech football player

Personal information
- Date of birth: 27 July 1980 (age 46)
- Place of birth: Příbram, Czechoslovakia
- Height: 1.73 m (5 ft 8 in)
- Position: Midfielder

Youth career
- 1987–1996: MFK Dobříš
- 1996–1998: Sparta Prague

Senior career*
Years	Team	Apps	(Gls)
1998–2003	Sparta Prague	0	(0)
2003–2004	SFC Opava	28	(11)
2004	Chmel Blšany	6	(0)
2005	Slovan Liberec	5	(0)
2005–2006	Chmel Blšany (loan)	15	(1)
2006	Slovan Liberec	14	(2)
2006–2007	FK Teplice	24	(4)
2007–2009	Slovan Liberec	44	(5)
2009–2010	1. FK Příbram	9	(1)
2010–2012	Vysočina Jihlava	44	(17)
- * Club domestic league appearances and goals as of 30 June 2012

Filip Dort (born 27 July 1980) is a retired Czech football player.

Dort played for several Czech First League clubs. He made his debut in the top league in the 2003-2004 season, while playing for SFC Opava. In his very first season Dort scored 11 goals and was eventually voted "Revelation of the Year" at the Golden Ball awards.
