= Archivum Mathematicum =

- Discipline: Mathematics
- Language: English
- Edited by: Jiří Rosický

Publication details
- History: 1965–present
- Publisher: Masaryk University (Czechia)
- Frequency: 5/year
- Open access: Yes
- License: CC BY-NC-ND

Standard abbreviations
- ISO 4: Arch. Math.
- MathSciNet: Arch. Math. (Brno)

Indexing
- ISSN: 0044-8753 (print); 1212-5059 (web)
- LCCN: 81646198
- OCLC no.: 818976614

Links
- Journal homepage; Online archive

The Archivum Mathematicum is a peer-reviewed open-access scientific journal covering mathematics. It is published by the Masaryk University's Department of Mathematics and Statistics of the Faculty of Science. It was established in 1965. The journal is abstracted and indexed in the Emerging Sources Citation Index, Mathematical Reviews, ZbMATH Open, and Scopus.
