= Jiří Rosický (mathematician) =

Czech mathematician

Jiří Rosický (born 1946) is a Czech mathematician. He works on the field of category theory. He is full professor at Masaryk University of Mathematics in the group of Algebra, Topology and Number Theory, which he led for several years.

== Life ==
Jiří Rosický was born in 1946. In 1963–1968, he studied mathematics at the Faculty of Science of the Masaryk University. In 1969, he started to work in the department of algebra and geometry at the Faculty of Science. In 1979, he became head of the department.

== Work ==
His work is in category theory, model theory, abstract homotopy theory, and general algebra. In 1980s he started working on interactions between model theory and category theory. This brought his interest to accessible and locally presentable categories. Along with Jiří Adámek he has written a book on the theory of locally presentable and accessible categories, which quickly became the most cited book on the subject. Closer to the 2000s he became interested in connection between weak factorisation systems and homotopy theory, and he wrote several papers on the subject of combinatorial model categories. He was active in several other topics, ranging from the theory of quantales to many aspects of general category theory: he introduced tangent categories and tangent bundle functors.

He serves as an editor for Theory and Applications of Categories. He is the editor-in-chief of the Archivum Mathematicum journal.
