= Jiří Rosický (footballer, born 1977) =

Czech footballer (born 1977)

Personal information
- Date of birth: 11 November 1977 (age 48)
- Place of birth: Prague, Czechoslovakia
- Height: 1.83 m (6 ft 0 in)
- Position: Midfielder

Youth career
- 1988–1996: Sparta Prague

Senior career*
Years	Team	Apps	(Gls)
1996–2000	Atlético Madrid B	54	(0)
2000–2003	SC Bregenz	63	(3)
2003–2004	Sparta Prague	0	(0)
2004–2005	Jablonec	3	(0)
2005–2006	Bohemians Prague		

International career
1997	Czech Republic U21	2	(0)
- * Club domestic league appearances and goals

Jiří Rosický (born 11 November 1977) is a Czech retired professional footballer who played as a midfielder.

== Career ==
Rosický joined local Sparta Prague's youth system at the age of ten. Abroad, Rosický played for Atlético Madrid's reserve team, spending four seasons in Segunda División and being relegated in his last as the main squad had also dropped down a level in La Liga. He then spent three years in Austria playing for SC Bregenz, where he scored three times in 63 matches.

In his homeland he represented FK Baumit Jablonec in the 2003–04 Czech First League. He later played for Bohemians 1905 before retiring at the age of 29, due to persistent injury problems with both knees.

== Later career ==
From 2018 to 2025, Rosický had roles as a scout and head scout at Sparta Prague.

== Personal life ==
Rosický's father, also called Jiří, played football as a defender in the 1970s. His younger brother, Tomáš, a midfielder, became the third footballer of the family. Also a youth graduate at Sparta, he played several seasons with both Borussia Dortmund and Arsenal, being a longtime Czech Republic international.
