= Jiří Rosický (footballer, born 1948) =

Czech footballer

Personal information
- Date of birth: 2 September 1948 (age 78)
- Place of birth: Czechoslovakia
- Position: Defender

Senior career*
Years	Team	Apps	(Gls)
1966–1977	Sparta Prague		
1978–1981	Bohemians ČKD Prague		

International career
1970	Czechoslovakia U23	2	(0)
- * Club domestic league appearances and goals

Jiří Rosický (born 2 September 1948) is a Czech retired footballer who played as a defender.

== Football career ==
Rosický made 90 appearances in the Czechoslovak First League between 1966 and 1981, scoring one goal. As well as playing for Sparta Prague and Bohemians ČKD Prague, his clubs included Dukla Prague and Tatra Smíchov.

== Personal life ==
Rosický is the father of two other footballers, namely Jiří and Tomáš.
