= Dušan Uhrin =

Football coach (born 1943)

Personal information
- Date of birth: 5 February 1943 (age 83)
- Place of birth: Nová Ves nad Žitavou, Slovak Republic
- Height: 1.83 m (6 ft 0 in)
- Position: Midfielder

Senior career*
Years	Team	Apps	(Gls)
1959–1964	Admira Prague		
1964–1965	Slavia Karlovy Vary		
1965–1969	Aritma Prague		

Managerial career
- 1976: Sparta Prague
- 1977–1978: CR Belouizdad
- 1980–1981: Spartak Hradec Králové
- 1981–1982: Sparta Prague
- 1983–1987: RH Cheb
- 1987–1988: Bohemians 1905
- 1988–1989: AEL Limassol
- 1989–1990: RH Cheb
- 1991–1993: Sparta Prague
- 1994–1997: Czech Republic
- 1997–1998: Al-Nassr
- 1998–1999: Maccabi Haifa
- 1999–2001: Kuwait
- 2001: FK Teplice
- 2002: AIK
- 2003: APOEL
- 2006–2008: Dinamo Tbilisi
- 2009: Slovan Bratislava
Medal record
Men's football
Representing Czech Republic (as manager)
UEFA European Championship
Runner-up	1996
FIFA Confederations Cup
Bronze medal – third place	1997
- * Club domestic league appearances and goals

Dušan Uhrin (born 5 February 1943) is a Czech and Slovak football coach and former player. He was the coach of Slovan Bratislava. Born in the Nitra District in the Slovak part of Czechoslovakia, he has lived in Prague since the age of 16.

He coached the Czech Republic national team for a total of 48 matches between 1994 and 1997, including at the 1996 UEFA European Championship, where the Czech Republic were runners up. He also coached Kuwait between 1999 and 2002. At club level, Uhrin coached Czech clubs Sparta Prague, FC Hradec Králové, Rudá Hvězda Cheb, Bohemians and Teplice, as well as Al-Nassr (Saudi Arabia), AIK (Sweden), AEL Limassol and APOEL FC (Cyprus), Maccabi Haifa FC (Israel).

== Honours ==
=== As a Manager ===
- Algerian Cup:
  - Winner (1): 1978
- Cypriot Cup:
  - Winner (1): 1989
- Czechoslovak First League:
  - Winner (2): 1990-91, 1992-93
- Czechoslovak Football Cup:
  - Winner (1): 1992
- UEFA European Championship:
  - Runner-up (1): 1996
- Saudi Federation Cup:
  - Winner (1): 1998
- Asian Cup Winners Cup:
  - Winner (1): 1998
- Georgian League:
  - Winner (1): 2007-08

=== Individual ===
- Czech Coach of the Year: 1991, 1992, 1993, 1995, 1996
