= Jozef Chovanec =

Slovak footballer (born 1960)

Personal information
- Date of birth: 7 March 1960 (age 66)
- Place of birth: Dolné Kočkovce, Czechoslovakia
- Height: 1.89 m (6 ft 2 in)
- Positions: Midfielder; defender

Youth career
- 1970–1978: Púchov

Senior career*
Years	Team	Apps	(Gls)
1978–1979	Sparta Prague	47	(6)
1979–1981	RH Cheb	27	(6)
1981–1988	Sparta Prague	208	(30)
1988–1991	PSV Eindhoven	33	(4)
1991–1995	Sparta Prague	99	(15)
Total		414	(61)

International career
1983	Czechoslovakia Olympic	2	(0)
1984–1992	Czechoslovakia	52	(4)

Managerial career
- 1996–1997: Sparta Prague
- 1998–2001: Czech Republic
- 2002–2003: Marila Příbram
- 2004: Slovan Bratislava
- 2005: Kuban Krasnodar
- 2008: Sparta Prague
- 2008–2011: Sparta Prague
- 2012–2013: Baniyas
- 2014: Ružomberok
- 2014–2015: Slovan Bratislava
Medal record
AC Sparta Prague
Winner	Gambrinus liga	1993–94
Winner	Gambrinus liga	1994–95
- * Club domestic league appearances and goals

Jozef Chovanec (born 7 March 1960) is a former professional footballer and manager. He took part in two major tournaments: the 1990 FIFA World Cup as a player for Czechoslovakia and UEFA Euro 2000 as manager of the Czech Republic.

== Career ==
As a footballer, Chovanec spent most of his career at Sparta Prague. He moved to the Netherlands to play briefly for PSV Eindhoven in 1988. At international level, Chovanec represented Czechoslovakia 52 times, scoring four goals, and played at the 1990 FIFA World Cup.

Chovanec coached Sparta Prague, with his first match being on 6 September 1996, Sparta were bottom of the league after seven games but Chovanec oversaw a turnaround, leading Sparta to win the league title the same season. He stayed in his role until December 1997, before leaving to become manager of the Czech Republic in 1998. The team qualified to the UEFA Euro 2000 through corresponding qualification with a perfect record of ten wins from ten matches to reach UEFA Euro 2000. Chovanec did not lead the team to 2002 FIFA World Cup, being eliminated by Belgium in a play-off at the end of qualifying, thus resigned from his position in November 2001. His final record as Czech national team manager was 27 wins, seven draws, and 11 losses from 45 matches.

Chovanec briefly led Sparta in May 2008 for the final league match of the 2007–08 Czech First League as well as the cup final, which he won. In October 2008, Chovanec returned to Sparta Prague for his third spell as manager, going on to finish the 2008–09 season in second place. He parted from the club in December 2011. He was appointed head coach of UAE Pro-League side Baniyas SC on a one-year contract on 19 June 2012. In March 2014, he became manager of Ružomberok of the Slovak First Football League until the end of the 2013–14 season.

== Personal life ==
Chovanec was born in Dolné Kočkovce near Púchov. He was married to a woman named Jitka, who died at only 53 years old in 2018. They had two daughters and four grandchildren.

== Honours ==
- Czech Footballer of the Year: 1986
- Czech Coach of the Year: 1998, 1999, 2000
