= Karel Brückner =

Czech footballer and coach

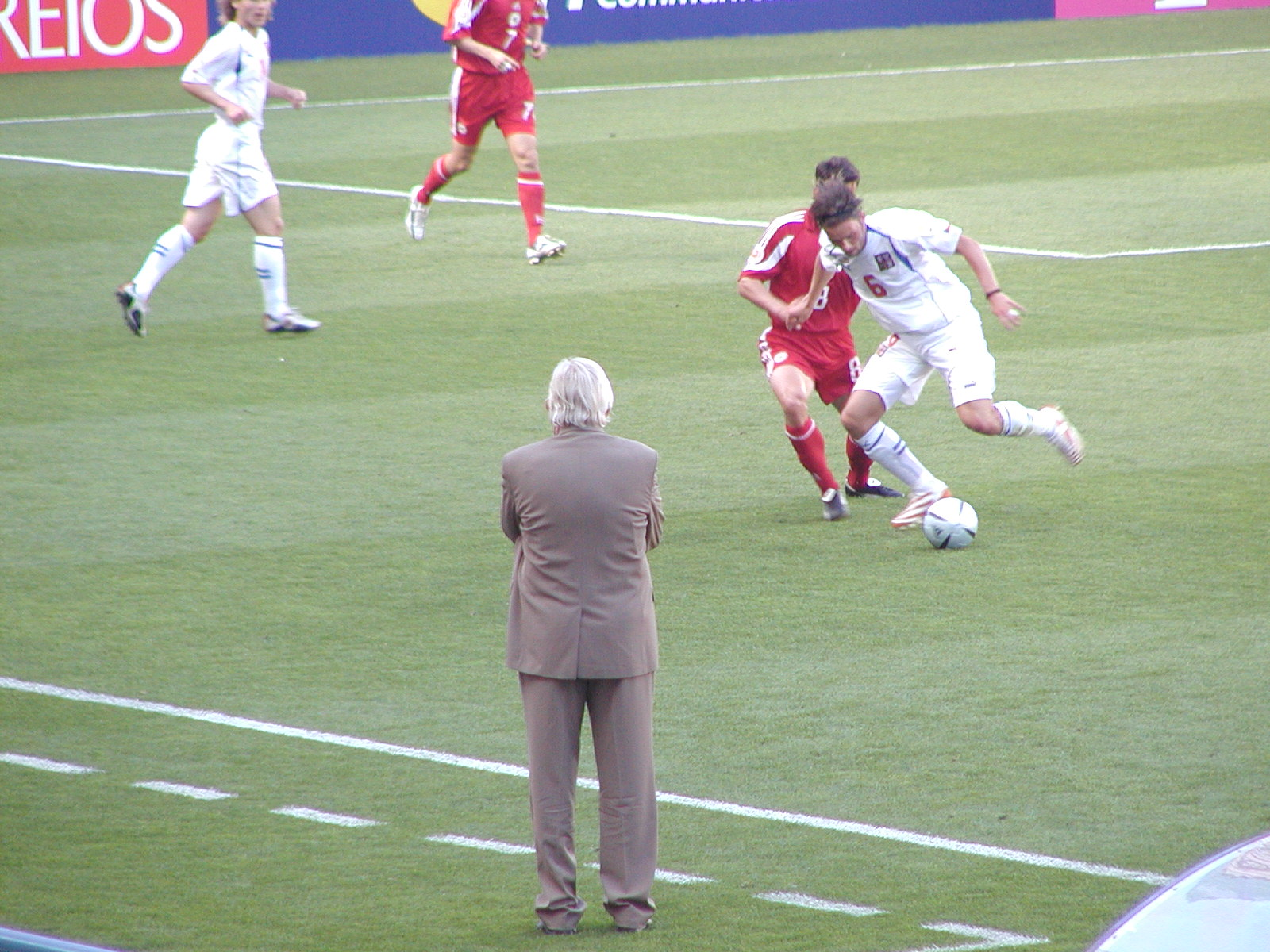
- Brückner (grey suit) coaching Czech Republic in a UEFA Euro 2004 match

Personal information
- Full name: Karel Brückner
- Date of birth: 13 November 1939 (age 86)
- Place of birth: Olomouc, Bohemia and Moravia

Youth career
- 1946–1958: Spartak MŽ Olomouc

Senior career*
Years	Team	Apps	(Gls)
- MŽ Olomouc
1970–1971	Baník Ostrava	2	(0)

Managerial career
- 1973–1979: Sigma Olomouc
- 1979–1981: Železárny Prostějov
- 1981–1983: Zbrojovka Brno
- 1983–1987: Sigma Olomouc
- 1987–1988: Czechoslovakia U-21
- 1988–1989: ZVL Žilina
- 1989–1990: TJ Vítkovice
- 1990–1993: Sigma Olomouc
- 1994: Petra Drnovice
- 1995: Inter Bratislava
- 1995–1997: Sigma Olomouc
- 1998–2001: Czech Republic U-21
- 2001–2008: Czech Republic
- 2008–2009: Austria
Medal record
Men's football
Representing Czech Republic (as manager)
UEFA European Under-21 Championship
Runner-up	2000
UEFA European Championship
Bronze medal – third place	2004
- * Club domestic league appearances and goals

Karel Brückner (Czech pronunciation: [ˈkarɛl ˈbrɪknɛr]; born 13 November 1939) is a Czech retired football coach.

== Playing career ==
Brückner played as a forward in the lower leagues for MŽ Olomouc, at levels between the Regional Championship and the Second League. He made two appearances for Baník Ostrava in the Czechoslovak First League during the 1970–71 season.

== Coaching career ==
Brückner began his coaching career in 1973 with his home club SK Sigma Olomouc, before moving to FC Zbrojovka Brno, who he led in the Czechoslovak First League in the 1981–82 and 1982–83 seasons. He later went on to coach Inter Bratislava with which he won the Slovakia Cup in 1985.

He was appointed coach of the Czech Republic national under-21 football team in 1997 and the side finished second at the 2000 UEFA European Under-21 Championship. At UEFA Euro 2000 he was assistant manager of the Czech Republic national side.

Brückner became the national team manager in 2001, following the Czech Republic's unsuccessful qualifying campaign for the 2002 FIFA World Cup. In the time up to March 2004, the Czech Republic played twenty matches without defeat under his leadership, winning seven of eight qualifying matches for the Euro 2004 tournament and drawing the other one. In the tournament's group match against the Netherlands, the Czech Republic conceded two goals within the first 20 minutes. Although Jan Koller scored a goal to make the score 2–1, Brückner responded by taking the unusual step of making a tactical substitution during the first half of the match, sending on midfielder Vladimír Šmicer to replace defender Zdeněk Grygera after just 25 minutes. The Czech Republic scored twice more, with Šmicer scoring the winner two minutes before the end, as Brückner's team completed a comeback. The team went on to reach the semi-finals of UEFA Euro 2004.

The team qualified for the 2006 FIFA World Cup but did not progress past the group stage. Brückner extended his contract for a further two-year period after the competition. The Czech Republic qualified for Euro 2008. Prior to the tournament, Brückner announced his intention to leave his position at the end of the competition. The Czech Republic failed to progress beyond the group stage of the tournament.

In spite of announcing his retirement, Brückner did not remain unemployed for long. In July 2008, the national team of Austria named him as their new manager. On 2 March 2009, the Austrian Football Association announced that Brückner had left his position as Austria's coach by mutual consent after having led the team to just one win in seven matches. On 8 July 2009, Bruckner was named Advisor to Ivan Hašek of the Football Association of the Czech Republic.

== Honours ==
Inter Bratislava

- Slovak Cup: 1994–95
